= Timeline of organized crime in Chicago =

Chicago, Illinois, has a long history of organized crime and was famously home to the American mafia figure Al Capone. This article contains a list of major events related to organized crime.

== 19th Century ==
=== 1830s ===
- 1837 – Chicago became incorporated as a city.

=== 1850s ===
- 1850s (late) – Because Chicago was built over a swamp, mud constantly oozed from beneath the city's wooden streets. It was decided the whole city would be mudjacked 10 feet (3 metres) and the city would rest on stilts, with stones at the base. This led to the beginning of the free-wheeling crime sub-culture that overtook Chicago. After the city was raised, criminals in the area began practicing their trades in rooms and tunnels beneath the city. English immigrant Roger Plant, who ran a brothel in the Chicago netherworld called "Under the Willows", became the chief of this criminal underworld.

=== 1860s ===
- 1860 – Chicago's mayor, John "Long John" Wentworth, serving two non-consecutive two-year terms, reduced his police force to 60 officers. Criminals from other states moved to the city's "underworld".
- 1868 - Sometime after the Civil War, gambler Michael Cassius McDonald moved to the city and later became what some consider Chicago's "first true crime lord". He began to appear in the newspapers of Chicago as early as November 1868, when The Chicago Tribune reported his arrest, along with national billiards champion John McDevitt and two other gamblers, for criminal conspiracy and the running of gambling dens after having apparently fleeced an intoxicated man out of more than $400 while playing faro.

=== 1870s ===
- 1879 – Michael Cassius McDonald, lived in the midst of what was called "Hair-Trigger Block," was a gambling kingpin who understood the power of a bribe. Also politically motivated, he brought his underworld friends and associates together to form "McDonald's Democrats" and got Carter Harrison IV elected as mayor. McDonald gained control of all of Chicago and the State of Indiana's bookmaking rights. His gambling joint, "The Store", was considered by some, whom the author of the book does not name, to be Chicago's "unofficial City Hall". McDonald and his men are credited with the term: "Syndicate", because of the gang's "crime consortium".

=== 1880s ===
- 1882 – Michael "Hinkey Dink" Kenna opened a saloon in the 1st ward.
- 1882 – Chicago Police Chief William McGarigle, in the pay of Chicago crime lord Michael Cassius McDonald, was indicted for graft and later fled to Canada.
- 1882? – John "Mushmouth" Johnson opened the Emporium Saloon and gambling establishment, began his reign as Chicago's first South Side Policy racket king.

=== 1890s ===
- 1890s – The under-manned city police department totalled 1,100 officers, for a 2.1 million population with "more than a dozen" vice districts.
- 1890s – The Valley Gang formed in the city, beginning with pickpocketing and armed robbery.
- April 5, 1892 – "Bathhouse John" Coughlin was elected a First Ward alderman. (Note: Reference incorrectly states Coughlin's age at election as 35.)
- 1893 – Coughlin and Michael "Hinky Dink" Kenna – "Lords of the Levee" – "form an alliance", ruling the First Ward, which, commercially, was the "most important ward in the city" until 1992, when the districts were redrawn.
- 1893 – Chicago's South Side Levee District opened for business to serve customers who weren't only in the city for the World's Columbian Exposition. Business for brothel owners such as black madam Vina Fields boomed, allowing her to employ sixty women while giving meals daily to those unemployed by the Panic of 1893
- 1894 – Frank Brunell founded The Daily Racing Form in Chicago.
- 1895 – Unione Siciliane was created in New York City in the 1880s as a fraternal organization and a legitimate business to sell insurance, help with housing, help learn English, settle legal disputes (even with the Black Handers) and do a number of other tasks to equip immigrant Sicilians with their new lives in America. The Chicago branch was chartered in the mid-1890s; and, apparently from its beginning, 25,000 Sicilians who lived in the city and 500,000 Sicilians who lived in Cook County, Illinois, were under the umbrella of Unione Siciliane's Chicago branch, which was a tremendous influence on the people it served and therefore was highly coveted for control by so many of the city's gangs.
- 1896 – The first of its kind "First Ward Ball", masterminded by businessman Michael "Hinkey Dink" Kenna and Alderman John Couglin, first made an appearance in the City
- 1897 – Michael "Hinkey Dink" Kenna became a First Ward alderman.

== 20th Century ==
=== 1900s ===
- 1900 – Because checking the immigration status of immigrants had become so lax, more than two million unchecked people lived in the city by this year.
- February 1, 1900 – The Everleigh Club, run by Madams Ada and Minna Everleigh" (Ada and Minna Simms), at 2131–2133 S. Dearborn Street, opened its doors in Chicago's Levee District.
- December 16, 1903 – The Lone Star Saloon, on south State Street, was shut down after the owner/manager, Michael Finn, was found to have been drugging patrons' drinks for years in order to rob them. This was an orchestrated effort with the help of his saloon workers. This practice became known in popular culture as giving someone a "Mickey Finn".
- April 28, 1906 – The Chicago Outfit's Boss-of-bosses for almost a half-century, Tony Accardo (Antonino Leonardo Accardo), was born in Chicago to a Sicilian-immigrant shoemaker and his Sicilian-immigrant wife, who both settled in America in 1905. At the time of Tony Accardo's birth, the family lived at 1353 Grand Avenue. The infant Accardo was baptized at Holy Name Cathedral, on Chicago Avenue and State Street. He was the second oldest of six siblings.
- 1907 – With the country's "biggest handbook center" in Chicago, Mont Tennes was the nation's undisputed gambling "czar", under the umbrella and with the blessing of First Ward aldermen John Coughlin and Michael Kenna. Tennes also controlled the nation's race wire system, which was important for horserace betting across the country at the time. Control of the race wire led to a very maniacal public dispute between the interested parties in the summer of 1907, including bombings. Tennes' own home was bombed.
- 1907 – A group of leading Italian citizens, prominent businessmen, several ethnic organizations and the Italian Chamber of Commerce formed the White Hand Society, a legal organization, to combat the Black Hand in Chicago.
- 1907 – Chicago gambling racketeer Bud White's controversial gambling boat City of Traverse was closed down after years of legally trying to stay afloat.
- September 1907 – A grand jury convened concerning the violence which had taken place during the summer over Chicago's race wire business. Two of the findings were that Chicago's mayor, Fred Busse, and the city's police chief, George Shippy, were bought by Tennes' racket.
- 1908 – The Chicago Coliseum sustained heavy damage from a bomb blast two weeks ahead of that year's "First Ward Ball", after the ball received increasing disdain through the years from the city's respectable and innocent citizens. Despite the blast, the ball was held there anyway. It is not known what, if any, information was found as to who was responsible for the bombing.
- 1908 – Future North Side Gang leader Earl "Hymie" Weiss was first arrested for burglary in Chicago. Weiss was caught robbing a perfume store and was immediately dubbed the "Perfume Burglar" by reporters.
- 1909 – North Side Gang leader Dion O'Banion was imprisoned for three months for robbery.
- 1909 – After enduring the "First Ward Ball" for over a decade, citizens groups pressured Mayor Busse into putting an end to the "debauched" extravaganza in this year.

=== 1910s ===
- 1910 – Chicago police arrested over 200 known Italian gangsters and known Black Hand members in a raid in Little Italy. However, none of them were convicted as many of the notes of extortion threats could not be traced to those men.
- January 1, 1910 – March 26, 1911 – Thirty-eight people were killed by Black Hand assassins, many by the unidentified assassin known only as "Shotgun Man", between Oak Street and Milton Street – "Death's Corner" – in Chicago's Little Italy.
- March 15, 1910 – The Chicago Vice Commission was organized by Chicago Mayor Carter Harrison IV, to be able to bring an end to the Levee District brothels and panel houses.
- 1911 – Again, North Side Gang leader Dion O'Banion was imprisoned three months for a "concealed weapons" conviction.
- August 1911 – By this time, there were 50 gambling establishments in the Loop. Respectable hotels hosted some form of gambling to draw patrons. According to the source's author, every block in the Loop had a gambling house in one form or another. Mont Tennes managed, oversaw, controlled it all, through his lieutenant, Mike "de Pike" Heitler. The only police raids that ever occurred at this time were on gambling establishments that competed with Tennes.
- October 24, 1911 – Chicago Mayor Carter Harrison IV, ordered the Everleigh Club closed down permanently, after the Everleigh sisters' fame and good fortune prompted them into distributing brochures for their brothel in respectable hotels and restaurants, where visitors to the city stayed and ate. Other brothels were then raided and closed in Chicago, which brought violence. The building which housed the Everleighs' brothel stood until July 1933, when it was demolished.
- 1912 – By this time, "Big Jim" Colosimo, then married to a brothel madam, controlled 200 prostitution houses. Colosimo took his place in Chicago's criminal history after becoming a leader in the city's Street Laborers Union and City Street Repairers Union – doing "honest work". He had already formed his own social club. Thus, Colosimo didn't go unnoticed by the Coughlin–Kenna political machine, who was looking to expand its votes base to other ethnic groups. It took Colosimo under its wing. When Colosimo began delivering big results, the First Ward "Machine" gave Colosimo "protected status". He became Democratic precinct captain. Police could not bother Colisimo, whatever he was doing. And, what he began doing was picking up brothel pay-offs for the "Machine".
- January 18, 1912 – Jim Cosmano, a major Chicago Black Hand leader, was severely wounded in an ambush by Johnny Torrio, near the 22nd Street police station. Cosmano had previously demanded $10,000, threatening to destroy Colosimo's Cafe if he didn't receive the money.
- July 18, 1914 – The closing of Levee brothels had incited violence in the area for some time, and on this day brought about the death of Police Detective Sergeant Stanley Birns and the wounding of a second officer. The Chicago Tribune entered the fray and directly blamed Michael Kenna and Police Captain Michael Ryan, who was dubbed, "Chief of Police of the First Ward", for the violence.
- 1915 – Boston, Massachusetts-born William Hale "Big Bill" Thompson, "politically unknown at the time", was elected mayor of Chicago with the help of Chicago powerbrokers William Lorimer and Fred Ludin. Thompson was in office for two consecutive terms, then lost, or withdrew from – depending on the source, the 1923 election which was won by reform candidate and Massachusetts-born William Dever. Thompson ran again in 1927 with $250,000 of help from Al Capone, won, then, was defeated again in 1931, by Anton Cermak. That was Thompson's final term. His time as mayor brought brazen corruption to the Mayor's Office and to the city. He promised the underworld and upperworld powers that were at the time "a wide-open city", which translated to: any vice, any corruption – any time. "An unabashed defier of Volstead", Thompson was also a key member of the Sportsman's Club. This group actively solicited bribes from all of the various Chicago underworld figures and also solicited their memberships in the club, including that of brothel racketeer Jim Colosimo. In addition to the underworld members, it also had Charles Healy, Chicago's chief of police, and Morgan Collins, a Chicago police captain as members.
- 1915 (approximately) – After future Outfit powerbroker Johnny Torrio had made numerous trips to Chicago to do "mob chores" for his uncle through marriage, racketeer and "the biggest whoremaster in the city", Jim Colosimo, Colosimo brought Torrio to Chicago permanently to run Colosimo's "houses", the kind of work Torrio was already doing for himself in New York. Colosimo's business thrived under Torrio.
- 1916 – The Illinois State's Attorney's office began an investigation of the Sportsman's Club.
- January 16, 1917 – Indictments were handed down by the Illinois State's Attorney's office charging eight men with bribery and graft concerning the Sportsman's Club. The eight were: Chief of Police Charles Healy, Police Captain Tom Costello, Tennes' gambling lieutenant Mike "de Pike" Heitler, William Skidmore, a saloon keeper, a gambler, a well-known politician of the time and two police officers.
- 1919 – By this year, Jim Colosimo was one of the "overlords of the underworld", in Chicago, "though there were others who operated in spheres of influence" in the city.
- 1919 – Interested parties, including local businessmen and private citizens fed-up with rampant local thuggery and murder in the city formed the Chicago Crime Commission, founded by Chicago Attorney Frank J. Loesch. In the 1920s, he was the one to coin the term, "Public Enemy", concerning Chicago's organized crime figures. In the 1930s, the Federal Bureau of Investigation (FBI) started using this term for the hoodlums and "n'er-do-wells" who would plague various parts of the nation.
- January 16, 1919 – The Eighteenth Amendment (Prohibition) was passed at the federal level, redefining American law. One calendar year was given to drinking establishments, breweries, etc., across the nation to close down. Drinking any alcohol was not, however, prohibited by the Eighteenth Amendment.
- July 27, 1919 – A full-scale race riot began in Chicago, with accompanying arsons, lootings and murders. The riot was initiated when a gang of racist thugs known as "Ragen's Colts", which started as a baseball team formed by two brothers, threw stones at and drowned an African-American swimmer who had strayed into the segregated "White" area of a South Side beach. The riot ended on August 3, 1919.
- October 1, 2, 3, 4, 6, 7, 8, 9, 1919 – The 1919 World Series between the Chicago White Sox and the Cincinnati Reds, played in part at Comiskey Park, had its memory forever tarnished when it was verified that a group of Sox players conspired to "throw" the series for financial gain. In the aftermath of the series scandal, eight Sox players were banned for life from professional baseball, even if they only knew about the "fix", yet did not participate. The players were: Arnold "Chick" Gandil, "Shoeless" Joe Jackson (questionable involvement at best), Eddie Cicotte, Claude "Lefty" Williams, Oscar "Happy" Felsch, Charles "Swede" Risberg, Buck Weaver and Fred McMullin. The 1919 Sox have been referred to as the "Chicago Black Sox" since that time. Finally, though always denying publicly that he had any part in the 1919 World Series "fix", New York City racketeer and gambler Arnold Rothstein has been repeatedly mentioned over the decades as the one who financed this scheme to "throw" the 1919 series, in order to personally reap a financial windfall through betting on the series.
- 1919 (late) – Johnny "The Fox" Torrio brought his cousin and Al Capone from New York City to Chicago to help with business, after he faced a couple of murder charges in New York.
- 1919 – Under the tutelage of forward-thinking racketeer Johnny Torrio, Al Capone stood in front of Jim Colosimo's multi-use house of prostitution the, "Four Deuces", at 2222 S. Wabash Avenue, barkering to male passers-by to enjoy what "Big Jim's" business had to offer. Johnny Torrio also ran Colosimo's holdings from that building. Pre-Prohibition, Colosimo's influence through Torrio, by then into suburban Chicago as well, had given Colosimo holdings of more than "a thousand gambling joints, brothels and saloons". Estimates are that the Colosimo-Torrio partnership was grossing $4 million a year at that time.

=== 1920s ===
- 1920s – By this decade, with the encouragement and allowance of First Ward aldermen John Coughlin and Michael "Hinkey Dink" Kenna "more than 100 gambling and bookie joints" thrived in the Levee District, and there were 800 more throughout the city. The opening up of houses of prostitution "spread like wildfire". Coughlin and Kenna had such a grip on what went on in the ward, not "a cop or a city inspector" could succeed making a move against them. The bribes totalled $60,000 a year, $10,000 more a year than when the aldermen hosted the, "First Ward Ball".
- 1920 – 14-year-old Tony Accardo's parents filed paperwork with the authorities claiming young Accardo was two years older so that he could leave school and go to work, an apparently common practice in that day.
- January 16, 1920 – Prohibition ("Volstead Act") took effect for 13 years. While all legitimate establishments that served alcohol had to close because of Prohibition, it's estimated that 200,000 speakeasies sprang up across the country to take their places. Between 1920 and 1928 the U.S. Treasury Department, which oversaw bringing bootlegged alcohol-making gangs – which included bathtub gin made by locals – to justice, fired 706 agents and prosecuted another 257 agents for taking bribes related to Prohibition alcohol. In Chicago, Prohibition had some professionals scrambling. Fifteen thousand doctors and 57,000 druggists "applied for 'medicinal' liquor licenses", and sacramental wine sales rose by 800,000 gallons the first year of the new law.
- 1920? – With the dawning of Prohibition, the Genna brothers decided to switch from extorting the wealthy to producing illegal alcohol (with help from many Italian and Sicilian families in Little Italy). Having only a permit to make industrial-grade alcohol, they took the finished product, put additives in it to make it palatable, then labelled it whatever they wanted – gin, bourbon, etc. Drinking the brothers' alcohol was known, even at that time, to "cause psychosis". The Gennas' base of operations was an alcohol processing plant at 1022 Taylor Street, in "The Patch", where allegedly the Gennas openly paid monthly bribes to a large number of police from the neighborhood Maxwell Street precinct and even had money left over for few men in the state attorney's office.
- February 2, 1920 – Labor racketeer Maurice "Mossy" Enright was killed near his South Side home.
- May 11, 1920 – Three weeks after marrying his second wife, gambling racketeer and "whoremaster" Jim Colosimo was gunned down in the lobby of his self-named restaurant at 2126 S. Wabash Avenue, supposedly waiting for a shipment of some kind. Nobody was ever charged with the murder. Police considered the "prime suspect" to be New York City gangster and Torrio–Capone ally Frankie Yale. At Colosimo's funeral, there was an open, obvious mix of gangsters and politicians at the "lavish" affair. Aldermen Coughlin and Kenna were kneeling before the coffin.
- 1921 – Within a fraction of time of Jim Colosimo's murder, Johnny Torrio had brokered a deal with all the city's major gangs to share the city's Prohibition wealth by dividing the city into territories that each gang had a piece of. Only the South Side O'Donnell Gang refused to come to the table. The gang was eliminated shortly thereafter. Within weeks of Colosimo's murder, Torrio had moved into the suburbs with his "army" stock of gambling, girls and booze. He persuaded the Gennas and Unione Siciliana to side with him, even though Torrio wasn't Sicilian.
- 1921? – After the Torrio organization partnered with the Gennas, buying whatever alcohol the brothers could produce, taking in shipments of Canadian liquor, and adding the "vice" element to his organization, Torrio brought in $10 million a year, with the blessing of Unione Siciliana president Michele "Mike" Merlo, now a Torrio friend.
- April 15, 1921 – Sam Cardinelli, extortionist and "Black Hand" leader, was executed by the State of Illinois for the murder of a saloon owner, after a challenge to the execution was heard by the U.S. Supreme Court.
- 1922 – Publishing magnate Moses L. "Moe" Annenberg bought the rights to The Daily Racing Form.
- March 22, 1922 – Tony Accardo was arrested for a "motor vehicle violation" just before his 16th birthday. This was his first known arrest.
- 1923 – Al Capone established his headquarters at the Lexington Hotel, at the corner of east 22nd Street (Cermak Road) and south Michigan Avenue, in Chicago. He also gained control of the Chicago suburb of Cicero, Illinois, as a "safe base" for his illegal operations.
- 1923 – Because of city political reforms, the number of aldermen per ward was reduced from two to one. Michael Kenna gave up his aldermanic seat in favor of his friend and ally, John Coughlin. Kenna was then elected First Ward Committeeman.
- 1923 – Tony Accardo was charged with disorderly conduct, for "loitering" around a pool hall where people of questionable character were known to congregate. He was charged $200 and court costs. He was still living at his parents' home.
- 1923 – Around the time of his first disorderly conduct arrest, Tony Accardo hit the little "Big Time" and joined the Circus Cafe Gang, which met at the Circus Cafe, 1857 North Avenue. At the time, the alleged leaders of the gang were Claude Maddox ("Screwy Moore"), Anthony "Tough Tony" Capezio, and Vincenzo De Mora ("'Machine-Gun Jack' McGurn"). Accardo steadily rose in the gang by going from pickpocketing, to doing home invasions, to driving trucks loaded with Prohibition alcohol. He was arrested eight times before age 21 while the young tough was with the gang, mostly for disorderly conduct.
- September 17, 1923 – George Meegan, a Chicago bootlegger allied with the Southside O'Donnells, and Southside O'Donnell member George Bucher were killed by Frank McErlane.
- 1924 – Prosperous Irish mobsters Paddy Lake and Terry Druggan, of Chicago's little-known Valley Gang, each got a year in jail for contempt of court. This gang was willingly taken in and made a part of Capone's organization by the end of Prohibition.
- April 1, 1924 - Frank Capone, brother of Al Capone, was killed by Cicero policemen during a gunfight which broke out in the city during the 1924 Chicago elections, during strong-arming support at the polls of gangster-backed, Republican politician Joseph Z. Klenha. Brother Al made sure his brother, Frank, had a "lavish" send-off at his funeral.
- May 1924 – Out of loyalty to one of his men, top Outfit boss Al Capone shot to death freelance hijacker Joe Howard at Heinie Jacobs' saloon on south Wabash Avenue after Howard had assaulted Outfit accountant Jake "Greasy Thumb" Guzik and then insulted Capone, himself, when he tried to find out why Howard "slapped and kicked (Guzik) around".
- May 19, 1924 – Despite conflicting accounts of the situation and its aftermath, on this date crime lord Johnny Torrio handed over $500,000 to rival crime lord Dion O'Banion, after Torrio believed O'Banion's story that he was tired of his life of crime and wanted to leave the rackets; thus, he wanted to sell Sieben Brewery to Torrio for $500,000 and make a clean break with his old life. What O'Banion didn't tell Torrio was that O'Banion knew the brewery was to be raided by the authorities, thus bringing beer production to a screeching halt and bringing possible jailtime for the apprehended brewery owners.
- November 8, 1924, Legitimate Unione Siciliana President Mike Merlo died of cancer. Of all of the Chicago "talking heads" of the day people would gravitate to, Merlo was one who tried to foster "peace" and civility among the warring Chicago gangs. Unione Siciliana was then taken over by "Bloody Angelo" Genna.
- November 9, 1924 – North Side Gang leader Dion O'Banion was shot multiple times and died, when three men identified as Albert Anselmi, John Scalise (who both secretly had switched alliances to Capone) and the handshaker, Frankie Yale, entered O'Bannion's flower shop, "Schofield's", 736 N. State Street, across from Holy Name Cathedral, on the pretense of picking up a floral arrangement. O'Banion's murder began a five-year gang war between the North Side Gang under O'Banion, then under Hymie Weiss, then under Vincent "The Schemer" Drucci (and later under George "Bugs" Moran), and Al Capone's Chicago Outfit, that probably started when O'Banion swindled Outfit head Johnny Torrio out of half-a-million dollars when O'Banion sold Torrio a Prohibition brewery O'Banion knew was going to be raided by the authorities.
- November 1924? – Apparently following O'Banion's murder, another North Side Gang member, highly decorated World War I veteran Sam "Nails" Morton, "known" by Chicago police to have committed several murders, was riding a horse in Chicago's Lincoln Park, when the horse threw the gangster and then kicked him to death. Morton's gangster buddies got the last word and exacted gangster revenge on the horse. The "hit" was planned by "Louis 'Two Guns' Alterie" (Leland A. Varain).
- 1925 – Joey "Babe Ruth" Colaro organized what would become Chicago's infamous, "42-Gang", which would become a virtual "farm team" for the ranks of the Chicago Outfit. This group of street delinquents would seem to do anything for a "buck", or to impress the "ladies". A number of these outlaws were recruited into the Outfit, with some of them making it into its highest ranks, including: Sam Battaglia, Felix Alderisio, Sam DeStefano, Marshall Caifano and his brother, Leonard, Charles Nicoletti, Fifi Buccieri, Albert Frabotta, William Aloisio, Frank Caruso, William Daddano, Joe Caesar DiVarico, Rocco Potenza, Leonard Gianola, Vincent Inserro and Sam Giancana.
- 1925 – Outfit front man and "42-Gang" graduate Sam "Momo" Giancana's arrest record consisted of more than 70 criminal offenses by this year. Giancana was considered the "prime suspect" in three murders before age 20, including the murder of a witness against him.
- 1925 – Vigilante citizens raids took place in Cicero, against Capone's whorehouses and gambling dens.
- January 12, 1925 – North Side Gang members Hymie Weiss, George Moran and Vincent "Schemer" Drucci followed the limousines that Al Capone and Johnny Torrio were riding in to a restaurant, at south 55th Street and west State Street. Both limousines were fired on in a hail of gunfire, but neither Capone, nor Torrio were hurt. However, Torrio's chauffeur and dog were killed in the attack.
- January 24, 1925 – North Side Gang members again ambush Johnny Torrio as he returned from a Loop shopping trip with his wife. The gunmen shot him several times and wounded him and his chauffeur, Robert Barton. As George Moran was about to kill the wounded Torrio, the gun misfired and Moran was forced to flee as police arrived on the scene. For two weeks after he was shot, it looked like Torrio would die, but he recovered.
- February 9, 1925 – Johnny Torrio was sentenced by Judge Adam Cliffe to nine months in the Lake County, Illinois, jail, in Waukegan, for being the owner of the Sieben Brewery when it was raided by the authorities. The jail was supposedly chosen by Torrio's lawyers as a facility necessary for Torrio to receive proper medical treatment for gunshot wounds; however, the jail was actually chosen for Torrio's protection as the prison warden, Sheriff Edwin Ahlstrom, was in the pay of Torrio's organization. Torrio was later escorted by Capone out of the city after his release. After much time to reflect in jail, Torrio decided the gangland empire he was trying to build was too risky, personally. He handed the entire works to Capone. When Torrio left the city for Brooklyn, New York, for good, at the end of 1925, or in early 1926, he took $30 million with him.
- 1925 (Spring) – One year after Republican Joseph Klenha won the mayor's office of Cicero with Torrio and Capone's support, Klenha vowed in print to "run his office independently of the gangster element". Al Capone went to the Cicero City Hall and beat the mayor unconscious in full view of the police, who did nothing to Capone. Thus, Capone became Cicero's "de facto mayor". At risk to the Torrio–Capone machine were 100 saloons and 150 gambling establishments installed in Cicero since Klenha had taken office. Note: It's not known if Johnny Torrio had left Chicago's organized crime scene by this point, because he would have still been in jail.
- 1925?–'26?–'27? Top dog in the Chicago underworld, Al Capone's organization was pulling in $105 million a year. Adding flash to his personality, Capone began buying $5,000 suits and custom fedoras at some point along the way.
- May 25, 1925 – "Bloody Angelo" Genna was murdered after being followed in his car by the North Side Gang and Genna smashing into a lamppost after being chased. Someone then stepped out of the other car and shot Genna to death. Apparently, nobody was charged with the gangster's murder.
- June? 1925 – A month after his brother's death, Mike Genna and Genna Family members Albert Anselmi and John Scalise, who had secretly switched alliances to Al Capone, were going for "a ride", where Genna was unknowingly going to be killed. During the drive, the gangsters got involved in a shoot-out with police. Genna was wounded and immobile, and Anselmi and Scalise bolted from the scene. Mike Genna died two hours later. Two cops also died because of the shoot-out. Following Mike Genna's killing, brother Tony Genna was killed by a trusted friend, after Tony Genna went into hiding following Mike Genna's death. Tony Genna's death ended the Genna crime family for good.
- 1925 – Sometime after Angelo Genna's murder, professional fiddler and gangster Samuzzo "Samoots" Amatuna walked into the Chicago branch of Unione Siciliane and declared himself the winner of the local chapter elections that hadn't happened yet. Al Capone became furious at Amatuna for this, because Capone had his own guy in mind for the job, Antonio Lombardo ("Tony the Scourge").
- November 13, 1925 – Samuzzo Amatuna, an ally of the "Bloody Gennas", was gunned down after sitting down in a Cicero, Illinois, barber shop chair, allegedly by North Side Gang members Jim Doherty and Vincent Drucci. Amatuna died at the hospital, before he could marry his fiancée. Al Capone then had Tony Lombardo installed as president of the local chapter of Unione Siciliana.
- 1925?–'26 – Realizing Outfit boss Al Capone was a "train wreck", according to one biographer, Capone mentor Johnny Torrio returned to Brooklyn, New York, and began work on, "The Commission", realizing that having a centralized ruling body overseeing organized crime in America would bring the overseers untold wealth and power and ultimately give more wealth to – and, in theory, produce less violence among – the individual crime families. The meeting took place at New York City's Park Avenue Hotel. The participants included: "Charles 'Lucky' Luciano" (Salvatore Lucania), who masterminded New York's five crime families and was the Genovese crime family's first boss, Louis "Lepke" Buchalter, who went on to head-up organized crime's assassins-for-hire group, "Murder, Inc.", Abner "Longy" Zwillman, who was a "Prohibition gangster" and who also went on to be a member of "Murder, Inc.", "Joe Adonis" (Giuseppi Antonio Doto), was one of the key criminal minds in beginnings of 20th-century American organized crime, "Frank Costello ("The Prime Minister", Francesco Castiglia), a powerful gangster who also went on to head the Genovese crime family, "Meyer 'The Brain' Lansky" (Meyer Suchowljansky), known as the "Mob's accountant" and a good friend and business associate of "Lucky" Luciano, and Abe "Kid Twist" Reles, allegedly the 'most feared' member of Murder, Inc. This meeting was reported in The New York Times, in 1935, and was, "ratted out", by one of the participants, Reles, in 1941. Following Reles' revelation, he either jumped or was forced out of a hotel room window. He died from the fall.
- 1926 – Beginning this year, forces from Chicago to Washington, D.C., had been at work to "dethrone" gangster Al Capone. With "The Big Guy" being the lead name of those who were turning the city into a shooting gallery, Chicago Loop banker, Rufus C. Dawes, and his brother, Vice President of the United States Charles Dawes, under President Calvin Coolidge, launched an all-out assault on Capone. The brothers' reason was clear. Rufus Dawes was president of the World's Fair Corporation at the time, which would bring the Century of Progress to the city, in 1933. Fear of being hurt or killed by gang gunfire while in the city could affect attendance, and the fair and showcasing Chicago life and business could be a financial disaster for the city and state. Capone had to be removed. The Dawes' lobbied both Coolidge and his successor, President Herbert Hoover. By May 1927, the brothers had handed to them "the goose that laid the golden egg", which would allow the feds to nab Capone and put him away for a long time.
- April 27, 1926 – After the South Side O'Donnells had been inching their way in on Al Capone's Chicago territory for a while, then in on Cicero, Illinois, Capone had had enough. With five cars and 29 gangsters, he went to greet the O'Donnells at Cicero's Pony Inn. No O'Donnell member was wounded, however. Capone's men did kill an assistant state's attorney who had been drinking with the O'Donnells. Realizing the gravity of what had taken place, Capone hid out in Michigan for a time. While Capone was in hiding, not only was the tide of citizen sentiment turning against him, police "sought reprisal, ransacking Capone's speakeasies, gambling joints and whorehouses, some beyond repair". His cash cow Cicero whorehouse was reduced ashes by a fire. While six grand juries addressed the attorney's killing, no indictments followed.
- July 1926 – When Capone returned to the city after hiding out, he went to the Cicero police who wanted to question him about the assistant state's attorney's killing. Capone responded with an apparently unconvincing line that he didn't kill the attorney, and he'd "liked the "kid" so much, Capone had personally given the attorney a bottle of alcohol for his father the day before the murder.
- September 20, 1926 – Using 10 cars in a successive motorcade, North Side Gang leader Hymie Weiss and his crew ambushed Outfit boss Al Capone with a cavalcade of bullets during his stop at the Hawthorne Inn in Cicero. Capone, being protected by his bodyguard Frank Rio, didn't have a scratch on him, neither did Rio. A Capone gunman, Louis Barko, and an innocent bystander, outside in a car during the attack, were slightly injured. Capone gave the injured bystander $5,000 for her medical bills. When Capone was asked who was responsible for that drive-by shooting, he reportedly said "Watch the morgue. They'll show up there."
- October 4, 1926 – In a show of magnanimity, Capone sent out RSVP invitations to host a citywide gang summit as Johnny Torrio had done. However, still enraged because of Dion O'Banion's murder, Hymie Weiss responded he'd be at the summit "with grenades exploding and guns blasting". He also wanted the heads of O'Banion's killers, something Capone would never have given up.
- October 11, 1926 – Three weeks after the last assassination attempt on Al Capone and one week following his summit invite, Hymie Weiss and his bodyguard were gunned down and three bystanders were wounded when the gangsters walked into their gang's clubhouse, the second floor of gangster Dion O'Banion's old flower shop, on north State Street. Weiss' estate was valued at over $1.3 million. Across the street from O'Banion's flower shop, Holy Name Cathedral still bears the bullet holes today from the ambush on Weiss.
- October 20, 1926 – Capone's gangland conference took place as planned, at the Hotel Sherman, across the street from a "chief of police headquarters". All of the major city gangs attended, and a still living North Side Gang member presented the conference's opening talk. But, the conference's goodwill was temporary.
- 1927 – A study found that in the city, 1,313 gangs existed, claiming 25,000 members.
- 1927 – Outfit heavyweight Paul Ricca got married. Al Capone was his best man.
- 1927 – Highly ineffective and short-lived against the criminal gangs who were raging against the city at the time, Chicago police tried to stop the criminals by employing groups of police officers who would be ready to shoot known criminals with machine guns at the drop of a hat. This group of officers was known as, "O'Connor's Gunners", after Chicago Police Chief of Detectives William O'Connor.
- 1927 – Sam Valante, recently hired by Joe Aiello, was killed while arriving in Chicago.
- January 26, 1927 – The Hawthorne Inn restaurant owner and Capone friend was killed by members of the North Side Gang. However, per the gang-conference agreement, Capone didn't retaliate. Yet, when the West Side's Joe Saltis killed gang member Ralph Sheldon, another Capone friend, Capone vented his rage on the West Side gunmen who killed his friend. Following the murders of these gunmen, Joe Saltis wisely "retired" to Wisconsin.
- April 4, 1927 – Arrested after being taken into police custody for perpetrating election violence, North Side Gang leader Vincent Drucci was shot four times and killed by Chicago Police Department Detective Dan Healy, while Drucci was in police custody. According to one report, the shooting was highly controversial.
- May 16, 1927 – The U.S. Supreme Court ruled that profiting from "illicit traffic(ing) in liquor" would be taxable by the feds (U.S. v. Sullivan).
- November 9, 1927 – Singer and comedian Joe E. Lewis was viciously attacked and slashed on the face and neck and left for dead in his Commonwealth Hotel room by henchmen associated with Outfit lieutenant "Machine-Gun Jack" McGurn, who was at least part-owner of the Green Mill Cocktail Lounge, 4802 N. Broadway, in Uptown, where Lewis had been under contract, but decided not to renew. After the attack, Lewis initially lost his ability to speak, but regained it with therapy. Al Capone stepped up and gave Lewis $10,000 to aid his recovery.
- April 10, 1928 – The extraordinary level of violence leading up to Chicago's Republican primary election led to the election being called the, "Pineapple Primary" because of the handgrenades used liberally by both sides. Adding to the chaos were "about 1,000" Capone minions breaking arms and legs of those who opposed Capone's candidate for mayor William Hale Thompson. Chicago Crime Commission founder Attorney Frank J. Loesch paid Al Capone a visit to "demand" that the gangster get his and all the other gangs to cooperate in a cease-fire leading up to the November general election. Capone made that work, and there was peace in Chicago.
- July 1, 1928 – New York City gangster Frankie Yale was gunned down in New York City by alleged Capone mob members, after Yale had tried to take over Chicago's Unione Siciliana by backing Capone opponent Joe Aiello, who was also backed by Chicago's North Side Gang. A second reason Yale was killed may have been that Capone found out that Yale was stealing Capone's liquor shipments and then selling them back to him.
- July 25, 1928 – Aiello gang member Salvatore Canale was killed outside his home in Chicago.
- September 7, 1928 – Capone's former consigliere and Unione Siciliane president, Antonio Lombardo , was gunned down during a busy Chicago rush hour, where north State Street divides Madison Street between east and west, apparently by the Aiellos. Capone vowed revenge and retaliated by killing four of Aiello's brothers.
- 1929 – The Capone organization was bringing in $6 million a week. Capone had a personal worth of $40 million.
- 1929 – Tony Accardo was allegedly made head enforcer for Capone's Chicago Outfit.
- 1929 – Chicago native Eliot Ness returned to the city as a U.S. Bureau of Prohibition agent, under the U.S. Treasury Department, with his "Untouchables" to try to stop the flow of illegal booze and bring down the Capone empire.
- January 8, 1929 – Unione Siciliane leader Pasquale "Patsy" Lolordo was killed in his apartment, supposedly by Joe Aiello and members of Moran's North Side Gang.
- February 14, 1929 – Four unidentified men, dressed as Chicago police officers, stormed into a Near North Side garage, S-M-C Cartage Co., at 2122 N. Clark Street, and murdered members of gangster George Moran's North Side Gang and two groupies, but missed killing Moran, who was not around when the killings happened. Known as the St. Valentine's Day Massacre, the attack effectively ended the five-year gang war between Al Capone and the North Side Gang, which had presumably started some years before, when one-time North Side Gang leader Dion O'Bannion swindled Outfit founder Johnny Torrio in a deal for a Prohibition brewery O'Banion knew would be raided. A second scenario believed to be the reason for the killings was that Capone found out that Moran's gang was hijacking Capone's booze shipments, so a phony shipment was set up to lure Moran's gang to its demise. Moran and gangster Joey Aiello went into hiding after the killings. At the time of the murders, Capone was vacationing at his Palm Island, Florida, compound. Nobody was charged with this massacre, but seemingly everyone known to be allied with a gang in the U.S., in the late 1920s, has been broached as a suspect in the Chicago gangster crime biographies written through the decades since the bloodbath. However, since the killings, it has been found through ballistics that one of the guns involved in the massacre was also involved in two other killings, that of a Michigan policeman and New York City gangster Frankie Yale. The gun was traced to Capone man Fred "Killer" Burke.
- March 1929 – In the wake of the St. Valentine's Day Massacre, Chicago Daily News publisher Frank Knox and Chicago Crime Commission director Frank J. Loesch pleaded with President Herbert Hoover for federal intervention in Chicago's gang wars. At that time, there were 63 gang-related murders a year. Besides the work of Knox and Loesch, there was group of crime-fighting Chicago businessmen known as the "Secret Six" who were working behind the scenes to bring Capone down.
- May 7, 1929 – Gangster Al Capone claimed he wanted to hold a party in honor of three mobsters in his ranks who he'd found out were actually traitors behind-the-scenes to mobster-rival Joe Aiello and Aiello's desire to wrest Unione Siciliane from Capone's grip. So, Capone held a ruse dinner at a roadside inn in Hammond, Indiana, in honor of ferocious killers Albert Anselmi and John Scalise and Capone's man heading Unione Siciliana at the time, Joseph "Hop Toad" Giunta. After the party was in full-swing, Capone personally beat the three traitors with an "Indian club". Then, Capone shot all three men. Their bodies were found on a roadside near Hammond. Contrary to popular culture, Capone enforcer Tony Accardo wasn't mentioned as having played any role in either account.
- May 13, 14, 15, 16, 1929 – While the St. Valentine's Day Massacre outrage was still brewing around the nation for many gangsters, mobsters from across the nation got together in Atlantic City, New Jersey, at the Hotel President, for the Atlantic City Conference, the first of its kind, to attempt to construct a national "crime syndicate", or so-called, "crime corporation", aka "The Commission". To ensure that things went smoothly, Atlantic City political boss and racketeer Enoch "Nucky" Johnson paid off law enforcement. The purported attendees at the conference besides Johnson were future Murder, Inc., boss Albert Anastasia (Umberto Anastasia), New York City bootlegger and numbers racketeer Dutch Schultz (Arthur Flegenheimer), another head of Murder, Inc., Louis "Lepke" Buchhalter, future head of the Genovese crime family Frank Costello (Francesco Castiglia), Genovese boss Lucky Luciano" (Salvatore Luciana), Prohibition bootlegger and Murder Inc.-associate Abner "Longy" Zwillman, bootlegger, racketeer and future "Mr. Las Vegas" Morris "Moe" Dalitz, Genovese family member Benjamin "Bugsy" Siegel (Benjamin Siegelbaum), Kansas City, Missouri, political boss Tom Pendergast, who had just helped launch future President Harry S. Truman's political career seven years earlier, and Al Capone. Capone brought with him to the conference Daily Racing Form owner Moses L. "Moe" Annenberg and Capone accountant and political "fixer" Jake Guzik. Former Chicago gang mastermind Johnny Torrio was there from New York, as he had instigated "The Commission" in the first place. The conference was called for to work toward a united front among the nation's organized crime leaders while removing the "old" mafia and bringing in the "new" mafia, cooperation during Prohibition and gambling concerns. While a "14-point peace plan" was the result of the conference, "Capone the man" also became a hot topic for discussion at the conference, because the other racketeers understood that despite payoffs to local authorities, the Feds would only take so much of what was going on in Chicago gangland before they would find a way to deal with it, and that treatment of Capone by the Feds might spill over onto other organized crime-controlled cities. Jealousy concerning Capone's "success" seemed to find its way into the conference: with their eyes on the Chicago turf war, which by the time of the conference was finished for good, the other organized crime bosses demanded that Capone "immediately dismantle" his gambling empire and give it to "The Commission". However, Capone "adamantly refused to be forced into that humiliation". The crime bosses also had the audacity to install deadly Capone-opponent Joey Aiello as the Unione Siciliane's Chicago branch president, which didn't last long.
- 1929 – Most likely following the Atlantic City conference and for reasons not quite clear, Chicago gang boss Al Capone "strolled" through Philadelphia, and was "arrested" on a concealed weapons charge. The arrest, which was solely a PR move, landed him in prison for "a year" at the Eastern Penitentiary, in Philadelphia. However, Capone was actually free to leave the prison when he wished, according to one biographer. The "incarceration" had been set up by Philadelphia racketeer Max "Boo Boo" Hoff, with Capone's knowledge and consent. While "incarcerated" in prison, Capone had a number of comforts, including use of the warden's office phone. Capone allegedly tipped the arresting policemen $20,000.
- May 29, 1929 – Thomas McElligot of the Westside O'Donnells was killed in a Chicago Loop saloon.

=== 1930s ===
- 1930s – Rival gangs threw dynamite into the others' cabs in what became Chicago's "Taxi Wars".
- 1930 – By this year, President Herbert Hoover's work on behalf of Chicago's "Al Capone" problem began to "get legs". A Washington, D.C., special prosecutor, Dwight H. Green, was dispatched to Chicago to "send Chicago gangsters to prison", specifically Al Capone. Any government ammunition Green needed to bring down Capone was at Green's disposal, as long as he could prove the need. However, Capone was not ignorant of the growing ground-swell of sentiment against him across the nation, even that his deeds had reached the Fed's ears, who he knew had started to make plans of their own against him by motivating men such as Frank J. Wilson, a U.S. Secret Service agent, and Elmer Irey, the Internal Revenue Service head. So, Capone sent some of his legal team to the nation's capitol, "to put in the fix", by spreading Capone's wealth around in the tens of thousands of dollars, at least. Yet, while the money was taken, it bought Capone no influences at all in Washington, D.C. To wit: The investigation into Chicago gangsterism also brought charges and convictions for tax evasion against Capone underlings "Frank Nitti" (Francesco Nitto), who was sentenced to 18 months in prison and a $10,000 fine, and Capone's brother "Ralph" (Raffaele Capone Sr.), who got three years in Leavenworth Federal Penitentiary and a $10,000 fine.
- 1930 – Months before Chicago Tribune reporter Jake Lingle's murder, Chicago Daily News news reporter Julius Rosenheim was shot to death by gangsters, after Rosenheim blackmailed bootleggers, whorehouse overseers and gamblers by threatening to write exposès about them. Apparently, nobody was ever charged with the murder.
- March 1930 – Gangster Al Capone had had enough of his PR exile in Philadelphia, so he left the prison.
- 1930 (likely the end of the Spring semester) – Soon-to-be "Super Lawyer" Sidney Korshak received his law degree from DePaul University College of Law. One of his most important functions for the Outfit was his work in eventually getting cash siphoned from the Teamsters' Central States Pension Fund to infuse organized crime's "promised land", Las Vegas, with cash. But, one to never be seen with any mobsters in public, a sanitized Korshak also "moved easily" in elite Hollywood, and in sports team circles and with captains of industry and commerce. Korshak's California office was at a Beverly Hills eatery called "The Bistro", where women and men would fawn over him, or want an audience with him. However, for Outfit business he always used the restaurant's pay phone. The "Super Lawyer" could do miracles for his legitimate clients anywhere with one phone call, even though he never tested for the California bar exam. His clients' bills went through Korshak's Chicago office.
- June 9, 1930 – Chicago Tribune reporter Jake Lingle was gunned down in broad daylight, in a busy Illinois Central commuter train station underpass, at the corner of Michigan Avenue and Randolph Street. At first, the deceased reporter was hailed as a hero. Over time though, people began to learn that Lingle's death had more to do with who his friends were, than what his news reporting was about. A one-time low-level member of St. Louis' Egan's Rats, Leo Vincent Brothers, found his way to Chicago and was convicted of Lingle's murder. He was sentenced to 14 years in prison, but was released from prison in 1940. It was noted by the author of this end-line reference that Brothers may not have been the one to shoot Lingle.
- August 1, 1930 – One-time pimp and former Outfit accountant Jack Zuta was gunned down while hiding out at an inn on Upper Nemahbin Lake, near Delafield, Wisconsin, after defecting to the North Side Gang. Some believe Zuta had even ordered the contract on Jake Lingle.
- October 28, 1930 – North Side Gang bootlegger Joe Aiello was shot to death after unsuccessfully attempting to bribe a hotel cook to poison Al Capone. Trusted Capone associate Louis Campagna has been alleged to be Aiello's killer as Aiello walked out of his apartment on north Kolmar Avenue. No one was ever charged with the murder.
- November 6, 1930 – Forty-two-Gang member at the time and soon to be Outfit rising star Sam "Teets" Battaglia and two other thugs executed a brazenly stunning armed jewelry robbery on the, then, mayor of Chicago's wife, Mary Walker "Maysie" Thompson, as she walked into her apartment. The crooks ran off with $15,000 in Thompson's jewelry and also with the gun and badge of Thompson's chauffeur-cop. Battaglia was never identified by witnesses of the crime.
- 1931 – William Hale "Big Bill" Thompson was defeated for mayor of Chicago by Anton Cermak.
- 1931 – Long-time freelance Chicago, "assembly-line" pimp Mike "de Pike" Heitler was found burned to death in the wreckage of his house after he defied the poor treatment he was allegedly getting, due to a Capone takeover of his whore house business, by "ratting" details concerning Chicago Mob business.
- 1931 – Sometime in this year, a group of mostly college graduates in the Chicago area, dubbed, "College Kidnappers", decided it was going to take the bold step of kidnapping low-level, area gangsters and holding them for ransom. Allegedly, the Klutas gang, named after leader Theodore "Handsome Jack" Klutas, took in a half-million dollars from these kidnappings in about a two-year span.
- October 17, 1931 – Al Capone was convicted of tax evasion following a four-day trial in Chicago. While Capone's original jury had been bribed by his underlings, the presiding federal trial judge, James Wilkerson, switched the jury at the last minute. It was also reported that Capone's defense team was ill-prepared to protect him against the stream of witnesses testifying to the gangster's "lavish lifestyle". However, Capone had "cut a deal" with the prosecutors during the pre-trial to drop 5,000 Prohibition violations that could have "nailed him" for 25,000-years-to-life if convicted on all the charges. The public talk concerning the trial, during and afterward, was that the poor showing of Capone's lawyers in his defense smacked of a set-up against Capone. Capone's close associate Paul Ricca was quoted explaining that Capone had to go away for a while, for the benefit of the organization. It has been said by the author of this end-note reference that Capone underling Gus Winkler was prevented by other Capone men from freeing him outright with $100,000 upfront tax payment (not a bribe) to the federal taxman.
- October 24, 1931 – One week after being convicted of tax evasion, Capone was sentenced to 11 years in federal prison (first, Atlanta Federal Penitentiary, then Alcatraz Island), fined $50,000 and charged $30,000 in court costs. While awaiting transfer to Atlanta to serve his sentence, Capone sat in Cook County Jail, where it was reported in this account that he had all the booze and women he wanted.
- December 1931 – Months before the nationally broadcast news about the kidnapping of aviator Charles Lindbergh's baby, in 1932, and some time before any federal kidnapping law was enacted, Outfit lieutenant Murray "The Hump" Humphreys kidnapped and held for $50,000 ransom Robert G. Fitchie, president of the Milk Wagon Driver's Union. Fitchie was released when the ransom was paid to Humphreys, who went to get the money, it was alleged.
- May 1932 – Capone began serving his 11-year sentence for tax evasion, in Atlanta, Georgia. He was eventually transferred to Alcatraz Island to finish his sentence.
- 1933 – Chicago "reform" Mayor Anton Cermak sent two city cops to Outfit frontman Frank Nitti's office to put a "hit" on the gangster. Apparently, the mayor wanted to take over Outfit territory and give it to the likes of Teddy Newberry, someone more to the mayor's liking. Nitti eventually recovered from his injuries.
- 1933 (early) – Theodore "Handsome Jack" Klutas was machine-gunned to death by cops after one of his gang turned on Klutas, ending the gang's kidnapping spree.
- 1933 – Des Plaines, Illinois, gangster Roger Touhy was arrested by the FBI and eventually sentenced to 100 years in prison for kidnapping a Capone associate, con man Jake Factor. The kidnapping has been widely seen as a frame-up by the Outfit to take over Touhy's rackets. Allegedly after Touhy's conviction, Outfit mobsters flooded into Des Plaines.
- February 15, 1933 – Corrupt Chicago Mayor Anton Cermak was riding in an open car with President-elect Franklin D. Roosevelt (FDR) in Miami, Florida, when Cermak was hit with sniper bullets. He died three weeks later. Speculation for years afterward was that Cermak had always been the sniper's real target, not FDR, the president-elect, in part because Cermak had put a failed "hit" of his own out on Outfit frontman, at the time, Frank Nitti. Cermak's assassin was a sharp shooter during his time in the Italian army.
- December 5, 1933 – Prohibition legally came to an end with the signing into law of the U.S. Constitution's 21st Amendment, by President Franklin D. Roosevelt. It was time for organized crime across America to find a new money-making racket.
- 1934 – Outfit member Tony Accardo married his fiancé and former showgirl, Clarice Porter. Within a short time after the marriage, Accardo became a capo who oversaw Outfit gambling.
- June 13, 1934 – The Copeland Act, federal anti-racketeering legislation, was signed into law by President Franklin D. Roosevelt.
- February 4, 1935 – Thomas Maloy, president of local 110 of the Motion Picture Operators Union, was killed by multiple gun blasts from a pair of gunmen while Maloy drove down Outer Lake Shore Drive, near the former site of Chicago's 1933–34 World's Fair. FBI Agent William F. Roemer believed the gunmen were Tony Accardo and Gus Alex, with Frank "Strongy" Ferraro going along to help out.
- February 15, 1936 – Once a top Outfit player, Jack McGurn was gunned down by three unknown assailants at Kafora Bowling and Billiards Parlor, 805 N. Milwaukee Avenue. Members and associates of the Outfit are the leading suspects in the murder. Nobody was ever charged.
- November 11, 1938 – Former First Ward alderman and "Levee Lord" John Coughlin died on this date, at age 78.
- January 1939 – Once feared and respected, Mob leader Al Capone was transferred from Alcatraz Island to the Federal Correctional Institution on Terminal Island, near Los Angeles, California, because of deteriorating health due to an advanced case of syphilus.
- November 8, 1939 – Chicago Attorney Edward O'Hare was shot to death by two unknown gunman who drove alongside his car while O'Hare drove down Ogden Avenue. Apparently, O'Hare double-dealt the Outfit by managing some of its affairs and also by feeding information about the Outfit to authorities for years. O'Hare's son, Edward Henry "Butch" O'Hare, who became "the Navy's first flying ace" and a Medal of Honor recipient in World War II, became the namesake for Chicago's O'Hare Airport sometime after his father's death and during the initial airport building stages in late 1943 or early 1944. The name proposal was suggested by Chicago Tribune publisher Colonel Robert R. McCormick, who had been part of the Illinois National Guard, which served a tour of duty in Europe beginning in 1917, during World War I.
- November 16, 1939 – Steadily declining in mental capacity and in overall health, Outfit boss Al Capone was released from federal custody and sent home to Chicago.

=== 1940s ===
- March 19, 1943 – Facing extended incarceration for the extortion of Hollywood film studios and being claustrophobic, Outfit front boss Frank Nitti got drunk and publicly committed suicide on an Illinois Central railroad track, in North Riverside, Illinois, blocks from his home.
- 1943 – The court in the "Hollywood Extortion" trial found eight men associated with the Outfit, Paul Ricca, Louis Campagna, Phillip D'Andrea, Frank Diamond (Maritote), Charles Gioe, Johnny Roselli and a New Jersey union boss, Louis Kaufman, guilty of conspiracy and extortion. They were all, then, sentenced to 10 years in Leavenworth Penitentiary. Though he was charged with these crimes, Frank Nitti was exempted from sentencing, because he'd committed suicide. Having steadily risen in the Outfit ranks, Tony Accardo became acting Outfit boss while Ricca was away in prison, with some claiming Murray Humphreys was co-boss with Accardo during that time.
- 1943 – Paul "The Waiter" Ricca met "Mad Sam" DeStefano in Leavenworth Penitentiary and must have told him to look up the Outfit boss when DeStefano got out.
- August 3, 1944 – Lawrence Mangano, a mobster who oversaw Outfit interests on the Near West Side, was gunned down at Blue Island Avenue and Taylor Street, along with his body guard, "Big Mike" Pantillo, during a night of Mangano's partying with a lady friend, after the Mangano car stopped because the partiers realized they had been followed for some distance that night. There were at least 200 shotgun pellets in Mangano's body, after being shot when he got out of the car to see what the problem was. Pantillo was shot when he tried to pull Mangano out of harm's way. The murders have never been solved. However, it's been suggested that Mangano's death made for an easier ascension and transition to power for new top Outfit boss Tony Accardo.
- August 23, 1945 – Capone-era, prolific Outfit bomber James "Jimmy the Bomber" Belcastro died of heart disease.
- September 1946 – Gangster James M. Ragen died of mercury poisoning, which followed Ragen being shot at with a hail of bullets and landing in the hospital the previous month, after the Chicago Outfit gave Ragen a chance to have his race wire business bought out by the mob. Nobody was ever charged with the murder.
- October 9, 1946 – Former First Ward alderman and "Levee Lord" Michael Kenna died from heart problems and diabetes at age 89.
- December 22, 1946 – During this week, the Outfit sent a delegation of its top mobsters to the "Havana Conference", in Havana, Cuba, a historic organized crime conference for top mobsters from throughout the U.S. The decisions and policies decided at this conference applied to the American Mafia infrastructure of all of the Mafia Families for decades thereafter. Acting Outfit head Tony Accardo was there, as well as Capone cousins, the Fischetti brothers, Charles, Joseph and Rocco. However, some of the Outfit's top brass had to be excused, because they were in Leavenworth Penitentiary. The 1946 conference was the last time the American Mafia's Top "Boss of bosses" Charles Luciano could have the full-expression of his power mean something, because earlier in 1946 he'd been deported from America back to Italy, but got to the Cuba conference on a forged passport. It was during this conference it had been decided that Genovese mobster Benjamin "Bugsy" Siegel would be assassinated for allegedly skimming Flamingo building funds for his own purposes and allegedly for being a terrible businessman in overseeing the casino's construction. According to this source, singer and Hoboken, New Jersey native Frank Sinatra, was allegedly the conference's entertainment.
- 1947 – The Outfit higher-ups who were each sentenced to 10 years in prison in the Hollywood extortion case were paroled from Leavenworth Penitentiary in 42 months, a decision granted at the time by U.S. Attorney General Tom C. Clark, under President Harry S. Truman. About two years later, Clark was appointed to the U.S. Supreme Court. One condition of Paul Ricca's release from prison by the court was that he was banished from ever associating with the criminal element or he was to, then, face serving the rest of his prison sentence; which, depending on what the reader believes, there were enough corrupt cops and prosecutors in Chicago to shield Ricca from even one appearance before a local judge for the rest of Ricca's life.
- January 25, 1947 – One-time head of the Chicago Outfit Al Capone died at his Palm Island, Florida, compound, of an advanced case of syphilus.
- June 20, 1947 – Following the murder of Genovese Family mobster "Bugsy" Siegel, which happened on this date, his "girlfriend", Mob courier Virginia Hill, was told by Outfit taxman Joe Epstein she "had to" return any money Siegel stole from his bosses during his building of the Flamingo, in Las Vegas. She did.

=== 1950s ===
- April 6, 1950 – After failing to keep his promise to use $200,000 of borrowed Mob money – mostly from the Chicago Outfit – to get newly elected Missouri Governor Forrest Smith to "open up" Kansas City and St. Louis to Mob interests, or to even pay the money back, Kansas City mob boss Charles Binaggio and his top enforcer Charles Gargotta were found shot to death, each man having four bullet holes in his skull showing a dice pattern, a way to murder a victim that is considered by law enforcement a Mob "hit". Binaggio and Gargotta were killed in Kansas City's First Ward Democrat offices. These killings were the springboard for the originally stalled United States Senate Kefauver Committee hearings, then just a month in the future. This was also the political ward which launched the political career of President Harry S. Truman, in 1922, whose Attorney General in the Truman administration, Tom C. Clark, set free on parole the incarcerated Outfit higher-ups who perpetrated the extortion of Hollywood celebrities and movie studio owners in the 1930s and early 1940s.
- May 10, 1950 – May 1951 – Broadcast live across America even though the majority of households didn't have televisions yet, the Kefauver Committee hearings (aka, United States Senate Special Committee to Investigate Crime in Interstate Commerce) convened in allegedly mobster-controlled cities around the nation, including in Chicago, where former pimp, Outfit accountant and legal wiz Jake Guzik made an appearance. Outfit "West Coast" man Johnny Roselli testified, but said a lot of nothing. Also, to testify was Captain Dan Gilbert, chief investigator for the state attorney's office in Cook County, Illinois, after not raiding a single jurisdictional "bookie joint" in more than 10 years. He was called, "The World's Richest Cop", by reporters. Outfit heavyweight Paul Ricca and bosses Louis Campagna and Charles Gioe were called to Washington, D.C., to testify before the Committee, but all said they had made their wealth from the "race track". Al Capone's living brothers, John and Ralph, also were called before the Committee in the nation's capitol. However, many alleged mobsters in other organized crime cities came down with, "Kefauveritis:" Spontaneous ailments which wouldn't allow the alleged mobsters to testify before the Committee at any location it called them to.
- September 19, 1950 – Outfit Florida-man Harry "The Muscle" Russell, with the help of Murray "The Camel" Humphreys, set a federal precedent in testifying before the Kefauver Committee when Russell was the first person in American history to invoke "The Fifth" – the right not to incriminate one's self – while sitting before any Congressional committee.
- September 25, 1950 – Fired former Chicago Police Detective William Drury was murdered in his garage, at the time he was investigating the life and activities of Outfit "Super Lawyer" Sidney Korshak for the Kefauver Committee hearings. Apparently, nobody was charged in the killing.
- January 1951 – Secret Outfit boss Tony Accardo followed up Harry Russell's Kefauver Committee precedent by invoking "The Fifth" 140 times, in Washington, D.C. Outfit boss Joseph Aiuppa stopped saying anything to the Committee and only chewed his gum. Both Accardo and Aiuppa were cited for Contempt of Congress, but neither citation was upheld in federal court.
- March 15, 1951 – Mob "girlfriend" and secret Mob courier Virginia Hill was called to testify before the Kefauver Committee for one, because the Committee knew that the Outfit had given Hill a ton of money for unknown reasons. While the verbally incendiary, verbally expletive-laden Hill didn't give up any information of value, she did put on quite a show for Committeemen and reporters alike. The Committee was aware of Hill's antics beforehand and had her sit down with it in a pre-Committee, closed-door session, as was warranted.
- May 28, 1951 – Outfit lieutenant Murray Humphreys, who schooled other Outfit mobsters in the art of "keeping quite" before Congress, had a contentious session with the congressmen while being asked personal questions about his life and family. He was cited for Contempt of Congress, but the citation wasn't upheld in federal court.
- 1952 – The IRS forced Murray Humphreys to pay taxes on the ransom money he'd received for the 1931 kidnapping Robert G. Fitchie, president of the Milk Wagon Driver's Union. Humphreys paid $25,000 in taxes on that money.
- 1954 – The Latin Kings criminal organization was formed in Chicago. The alleged motivation for forming this group was an attempt to overcome the prejudices that Hispanics faced at the time.
- August 18, 1954 – Having weathered federal prison for participating in the "Hollywood Extortion Scandal" in the 1940s, Outfit lieutenant Charles Gioe was murdered while driving on a Chicago street. Gioe's mobster-associate passenger, Hymie Weisman, escaped being murdered by fleeing the car. Mob underlings who worked for Outfit-connected labor leader Joey Glimco have been suspected of carrying out the assassination. But, nobody was ever charged with the murder.
- 1955 – On order from soon-to-be Outfit front boss Sam Giancana, Outfit loanshark and "nutjob" Sam DeStefano killed his low-level mobster and drug-addicted brother, Michael. When DeStefano was questioned about the killing, he laughed uncontrollably. So, while an untold number of connected guys may have put Mob-associated blood relatives "to sleep" throughout the decades, just as part of their "job descriptions", there is evidence that Sam DeStefano was a "devil worshipper".
- November 4, 1955 – Extortionist, informer and former pimp Willie Bioff ("William Nelson") was blown to smithereens by a dynamite bomb blast from under his car, after turning on the ignition at his Phoenix, Arizona, home. He testified against his Outfit friends more than a decade earlier for a lighter sentence in the, "Hollywood Extortion Case", and was found at that later time, supposedly by Outfit Las Vegas, casino overseer and assassin Marshall Caifano (Marcello Giuseppi Caifano), to be working as the entertainment director at Gus Greenbaum's Riviera Hotel and Casino. Nobody was ever charged in the murder.
- February 21, 1956 – One-time pimp, turned Capone confidant, Outfit legal wiz and top accountant, Jake Guzik died of a heart attack at his post at St. Hubert's Olde English Grill, on Federal Street. However, the Mob brass did not want Guzik to be found dead in a gangster hangout. So, they secreted his body to his home and told his wife to tell medical personnel Guzik died there.
- February 21, 1956? – After the death of the Outfit's highly esteemed Jake Guzik, Outfit lieutenant Murray Humphreys became the Chicago Mob's chief "political fixer".
- 1957 – Outfit consigliere Paul Ricca was ordered by a court to be stripped of his U.S. citizenship and then ordered deported back to Italy. But, in the midst of Ricca's legal team's maneuvering, court appeals and bid to "tell the truth" about the mobster, neither Italy, nor any other country applied to, would take him.
- 1957 (early) – Tony Accardo retired from the day-to-day leadership of the Chicago Outfit and appointed Sam Giancana to oversee these operations of the crime syndicate. However, Accardo remained a presence in the organization serving in an advisory capacity as consigliere on all major Outfit business and assassinations.
- February 25, 1957 – One-time Prohibition bootlegger and Al Capone nemesis George Moran died of cancer in Leavenworth Federal Penitentiary, after being sentenced to 10 years in prison for bank robbery. He had just completed a previous 10-year sentence for another robbery. Moran was buried in a wooden casket outside the prison.
- April 16, 1957 – Foundational Outfit leader Johnny Torrio died of a heart attack while in a barber chair in Brooklyn, New York.
- November 14, 1957 – An aborted Mafia conference took place in Apalachin, New York, after state police and federal investigators showed up at the home of Genovese Family member Joseph "The Barber" Barbara Sr. (According to these sources, some label Barbara as only a businessman with "friends" in organized crime), unannounced. Fifty-eight high-level Mob members from various parts of the country were detained by the police. Outfit consigliere Tony Accardo and newly elevated Outfit front-boss Sam Giancana, reportedly at the conference, were not among those detained. They had gotten away unnoticed. Yet, any charges filed against any conference members were not related to the conference itself, because it was simply a meeting. Conspicuous by their absences: Meyer Lansky, Frank Costello, "Doc Stacher" (Joseph Oystacher), the New Orleans Mob representatives and Charles Luciano, who was deported at the time, didn't attend the meeting. There has been considerable speculation over the years as to why the raid took place at all. One source said the raid happened because of "money matters" between Barbara and the police. Another source pointed to recorded statements to back the idea that this meeting and subsequent raid were allowed to occur as a set-up to embarrass incoming Mob boss Vito Genovese. Another source said the raid happened because of good police work by a local cop. However, six months after the conference, Genovese was arrested on drug charges and received a 15-year sentence. He died after 10 years in prison.
- November 27, 1957 – In the wake of the stunning news of organized crime's Apalachin conference, FBI Director J. Edgar Hoover ordered all FBI field offices to implement his "Top Hoodlum Program: Anti-Racketeering" and assign agents to investigate organized crime in those cities, including Chicago.
- 1958 – The Vice Lords criminal organization was founded in St. Charles Correctional Facility by a group of young thugs from 16th Street, on Chicago's west side.
- 1958 – During the United States Senate Select Committee on Improper Activities in Labor and Management hearings (McClellan Committee meetings), in Washington, D.C., Outfit Nevada casino overseer and "hitman" Marshall Caifano invoked the "Fifth Amendment" 73 times. During John "Jackie the Lackey" Cerone's "testimony" at the McClellan Committee hearings, he took "The Fifth" 45 times.
- December 3, 1958 – Brilliant accountant, Las Vegas point man and Outfit-connected Gus Greenbaum and his wife were found brutally murdered in their Phoenix, Arizona, home. There could have been any number of reasons for the Greenbaums' murders, including his alleged casino skimming, or the fact that he'd hired Outfit "Rat" Willie Bioff to work at one of the casinos following the "Rat's" betrayal of his Outfit loyalties. Nobody was ever charged with the Greenbaums' killings.
- Mid-1959 – Actor, producer and Desilu Productions owner Desi Arnaz had a Mob "contract" put out on his life by the Outfit for creating and producing the very "less than accurate", cult-television hit, The Untouchables, which incited Italians across the nation at the time. Arnaz even refused to back down from the project when he got a call from Al Capone's son, "Sonny", Arnaz's childhood classmate and one-time best friend. The contract was apparently stopped when Al Capone's wife, Mae, dissented to the "hit" and after singer Frank Sinatra, sent in to talk Arnaz out of the project, got a million-dollar deal to produce whatever movie he wanted at Desilu.
- July 1, 1959 – Outfit heavyweight Paul Ricca was sentenced to 10 years (reduced to three years) at the federal prison in Terre Haute, Indiana, for tax evasion. He served 27 months.
- December 16, 1959 – After spending 26 years of his 100-year sentence in prison for a kidnapping that was concluded by Federal Judge John H. Barns not to be a kidnapping at all, but instead was a "disappearing" by con man Jake Factor, Des Plaines, Illinois, racketeer Roger Touhy was eventually released from prison one month before he was gunned down on the steps of his sister's house on this date. A $40,000 price was allegedly put on the "hit" for Touhy, by Outfit lieutenant Murray Humphreys. Humphreys then awarded the contract to himself. But, no evidence was found to link him to the murder.

=== 1960s ===
- 1960s – The Black Gangster Disciples criminal organization was formed on Chicago's South Side, by uniting two separate gangs. The two gangs conjoined were, The Supreme Gangsters, led by Larry Hoover, and the Devil's Disciples, led by David Barksdale.
- 1960 – The State of Nevada's Gaming Control Board first published the so-named, "Black Book", which had a short list of 11 names of men banned from all casinos in Nevada. 11 of the 11 men were allegedly associated with the Chicago Outfit: Sam Giancana, Murray Humphreys and Marshall Caifano, who sued on constitutional grounds and also seemingly for slander, but lost his case. The 'Black Book" is still published today.
- 1960 – Summerdale scandals; Eight Chicago police officers were accused of operating a large-scale burglary ring, an embarrassment to the city's mayor at the time, Richard J. Daley.
- June 1960 – Outfit boss Tony Accardo and his lieutenant, Murray Humphreys, and two other mobsters were having dinner during a weekly Thursday meeting at Accardo's Franklin Avenue address, in River Forest, Illinois. However, this meeting, in particular, was to "decide who would become the next president of the United States".
- November 15, 1960 – Outfit frontman Sam Giancana allegedly "fixed" the 1960 U.S. presidential election-day results in Cook County, Illinois, in favor of Sen. John F. Kennedy, of Massachusetts. Presidential-race challenger Richard Nixon, vice president under President Dwight D. Eisenhower at the time, did not challenge the race's election results in court.
- August 11, 1961 – Outfit loanshark William "Action" Jackson was suspended on a meathook and tortured two to three days until he died of shock, by fellow Outfit mobsters who mistakenly thought Jackson had become an FBI informant. While nobody was ever charged in the murder, apparently at least some of Jackson's killers – who included enforcers Fiore "Fifi" Buccieri, James "Turk" Torello, John "Jackie the Lackey" Cerone, Sam DeStefano and Dave Yaras – were found discussing Jackson's torture-murder on an FBI surveillance tape. Also, while some believe Jackson reported to DeStefano, he actually reported to William "Willie Potatoes" Daddano Sr., according to the FBI.
- 1961 – Robert F. Kennedy became U.S. Attorney General under his brother, President John F. Kennedy. Robert Kennedy, "....was the first attorney general of the United States to make a serious attack on the Mafia and organized crime;" and, "many hold he was the last one".
- November 30, 1961 – President John F. Kennedy authorized "Operation Mongoose", a plan to clandestinely assassinate the leader of Cuba's revolutionary military forces, Fidel Castro. In cooperation with the CIA, the federal government was allegedly planning to use members of the Chicago Outfit, such as Sam Giancana and Johnny Roselli, to carry out this operation. See also: "Family Jewels".
- May 2, 1962 – Chicago police received a call that a suspicious car was parked on Superior Street. When the police checked out the call at 1:00 a.m., they found two men on the floor of a 1962 Ford sedan trying to not be noticed in the car. Ultimately, the two men told police they were waiting for someone they didn't know, in a car that wasn't either of theirs, nor did either of them know who owned the car – someone who ultimately turned out to be non-existent. But, the men in the car turned out to be Outfit "hitmen" Felix "Milwaukee Phil" Alderisio, of Riverside, Illinois, and Charles Nicoletti, also of Riverside, The two were taken into custody and each posted $1,000 bond. However, police couldn't link the "hitmen" to any crime of the moment, or even link them to the car they were found in. So, the men were let go, even though the car, later dubbed the "Hitmobile" by reporters, had a secret compartment for guns and extra switches installed to turn off the taillights. There was also a switch to change license plates on the car. The car was impounded by the police.
- May 3, 1962 – Chicago-area Burglar Jimmy Miraglia went missing.
- May 15, 1962 – The bodies of burglars Jimmy Miraglia and Billy McCarthy were found in the trunk of a car on west 55th Street. They were badly beaten and their throats were slit. At one point earlier, they had received "juice loans" from loanshark Sam DeStefano. They had also, some time before, killed three people in a robbery attempt in a neighborhood called "off limits" by Outfit brass. DeStefano, Tony Spilotro, Charles Nicoletti, Carlo Olandese and Felix Alderisio were involved in murdering the two burglars, according to court testimony years later. It was also found out that McCarthy was tortured to find out the whereabouts of his partner, Miraglia. One of the tortures that McCarthy was subjected to was having his head put in a vice and having the vice tightened until he talked. But, one of his eyes then popped out as the vice was tightening, instead. However, McCarthy gave up Miraglia's whereabouts anyway. McCarthy was then killed. Yet, unlike the popular Mob movie, Casino, in which the vice torture was re-enacted, this source is unsure which Outfit torturer tightened the vice on burglar McCarthy. The torture deaths of these two men is known as the "M&M Murders" in the Chicago crime annals.
- 1963 – The FBI's "lockstep surveillance" of Outfit front boss Sam Giancana began.
- Outfit front boss Sam Giancana was thrown in federal prison for one year for a federal Contempt of Court citation, when he refused to testify to his or the Chicago Outfit's alleged criminal activities.
- November 23, 1965 – Outfit lieutenant, legal strategist and chief "political fixer" Murray "The Camel" Humphreys suffered a fatal heart attack. A "laceration" was found on the back of the deceased Humphreys' head, below his right ear. Some believe that Humphreys could have been stuck with an empty hypodermic needle and had a shot of air sent to his heart, causing his heart attack. Just prior to the heart attack, he'd had a visit at his apartment from some FBI agents where he'd pulled a gun on them. Humphreys had to post bail for this erratic behavior. Allegedly, then, word spread that "The Hump" was "losing it".
- May 20, 1966 – While hiding out with his family at the Country Club Motel, at 8303 North Avenue, building contractor and Tony Accardo friend Sam Panveno ("Van Corbin") was shot and killed by two unknown men, after Accardo found out Panveno had been paid a visit by FBI Agent Bill Roemer. The specific motive for the killing is unclear. Apparently, Panveno built one of the Accardos' River Forest, Illinois, homes. Nobody was ever charged with Panveno's murder.
- December 1966 – After being let out of federal prison after one year, Sam Giancana was then deposed as Outfit front boss, due to his high-profile lifestyle and his surly, confrontational demeanor to authorities that brought an abundance of "heat and light" on Chicago's underworld. He then moved to Mexico to oversee the Outfit's international gambling operations.
- 1968 – The Outfit's man in Hollywood, Johnny Roselli, still a formidable force in, "Tinseltown", and several other people, cheated Hollywood celebrities, including Tony Martin. Phil Silvers and Zeppo Marx, out of $400,000 in a crooked card game.

=== 1970s ===
- February 17, 1970 – The Towne Hotel (formerly Capone's Hawthorne Inn), 4833 22nd Street, Cicero, Illinois, burned to the ground. When questioned about its ownership, Outfit front boss Joseph "Ha Ha" Aiuppa pleaded "the Fifth" five dozen times. He must have remembered what Outfit lieutenant Murray Humphreys had taught him going into the Kefauver Committee hearings in the 1950s.
- August 1970 – Outfit loanshark and juice loan collector Michael "Hambone" Albergo went missing after receiving a federal indictment concerning his mob activities. More than 35 years later, fellow mob associate and loanshark Frank Calabrese Sr., was convicted during the 2007 "Operation Family Secrets" trial of killing Albergo and burying his body under what is now the U.S. Cellular Field parking lot, on west 35th Street, in the Armour Square neighborhood, on Chicago's South Side. Calbrese received life in prison for that murder and the other murders he was convicted of committing during the trial. Calabrese's brother, Nick, was also one of Albergo's assassins. But, Nick Calabrese became the prosecution's star witness against his brother, Frank, and other mobsters, who were tried on various other charges. Nick Calabrese was taken in to the Federal Witness Protection Program after the trial.
- October 15, 1970 – The federal Racketeer Influenced and Corrupt Organizations Act (RICO) law was enacted to allow federal prosecutors to look at organized crime not just as various people committing various, unrelated crimes against the law, but instead to look at it as a group of people committed to acting illegally in order to maintain and sustain a specific, orchestrated "criminal enterprise". This law was first used against organized crime in the mid-1980s.
- September 25, 1971 – One-time day-to-day boss, prolific earner and hitman Felix "Milwaukee Phil" Alderisio died in federal prison of natural causes, after being convicted of extortion. His funeral was attended by the top Outfit brass, including Tony Accardo.
- 1972 – Very under-the-radar, yet very highly placed Outfit North Side boss Ross Prio died of natural causes. It was said he was even consulted on "hits".
- October 11, 1972 – Behind-the-scenes boss and ultimate Outfit consigliere Paul Ricca died of a heart attack.
- 1973 – Outfit tough guy and frontman Sam Battaglia died in prison during a 15-year sentence, after being convicted of extortion six years earlier.
- April 14, 1973 – Outfit loanshark Sam DeStefano was shotgunned to death in his garage, allegedly by his brother Mario and one-time Sam DeStefano protégé Tony Spilotro. Nobody was charged in the murder.
- December 20, 1973 – Richard Cain, cop turned mobster, turned informant for the FBI, was shot in the head at a busy Rose's Sandwich Shop, on 1117 W. Grand Avenue. The alleged suspects are Marshall Caifano and Joseph Lombardo. No one has ever been charged in the murder.
- September 27, 1974 – Once complicit with Chicago Outfit activity, area businessman and federal witness Daniel Seifert was gunned down at his Bensenville, Illinois, plastics factory, in front of his wife and youngest son for deciding to testify in a federal investigation as to his knowledge of an embezzled and "laundered" $1.4 million from the Teamsters' Central States Pension Fund. Joseph Lombardo Sr., was convicted of the murder during the "Operation Family Secrets" trial and was sentenced to life in prison. During the trial, evidence was shown that Lombardo's fingerprint was on the car title of the car used in Seifert's murder.
- June 19, 1975 – Former boss Sam Giancana was shot in the back of the head while cooking a snack of sausages and escarole in his Oak Park home on his birthday. It has been debated whether it was the Outfit or CIA that murdered Giancana. There has been speculation that alleged Outfit associate Butch Blasi, Giancana's friend and one-time driver, who visited him on the night of his death, was his killer. But, nobody was ever charged in the murder.
- June 24, 1975 – Outfit "West Coast" man Johnny Roselli testified during a special hearing of U.S. Senate Intelligence Committee, in Washington, D.C.
- September 9, 1975 – Valued Outfit capo and adept torturer William "Willie Potatoes" Daddano Sr., died in federal prison, about three months after his good friend from his "42-Gang" days, Outfit front boss Sam Giancana, was assassinated.
- August 9, 1976 – The decomposing body of Johnny Roselli was found floating in a 55-gallon drum, in Florida's Biscayne Bay, following a not-quite completed hit. The killers forgot to make sure the drum wouldn't surface with the body in it. His legs were sawn off and shoved in the barrel with the body. There had been speculation as to who had killed Roselli, including Santo Trafficante Jr., the alleged Florida Mafia boss at the time who, at least, would have had to give permission for Roselli's body to be dumped in Florida. But, nobody was ever charged with Roselli's murder.
- February 17, 1977 – Helen Brach, heiress to the Brach's candy fortune, disappeared after leaving the Mayo Clinic gift shop. The alleged suspects in her disappearance are her "houseman", Jack Matlick, her alleged lover Richard Bailey, horse stable owner Silas Jayne and Outfit associates Victor Spilotro and Curtis Hansen. Only Bailey was charged with, but not convicted of, her murder. Brach has never been found dead, or alive, and was declared dead in May 1984.
- March 29, 1977 – Feared hitman Charles Nicoletti was killed by three .38-caliber slugs to the head, while waiting in his Oldsmobile at the Golden Horns Restaurant, in Northlake, Illinois. Supposedly, Outfit front boss Joey Aiuppa ordered the "hit", because he believed Nicoletti had become an informant, which was untrue. Outfit assassin Harry Aleman allegedly did the "hit". Nobody was ever charged with Nicoletti's murder.
- November 1977 – Jewelry store owner Harry Levinson walked into his north Clark Street store to find he'd been robbed of all his most expensive jewelry. It was a financial disaster, especially since Christmas was a month away. The thieves had broken in and left the store without the alarm system sounding. Levinson called police, but the police had found the thieves so good they left no trace of evidence. Then, Levinson called on his friend and top Outfit boss Tony Accardo. At the end of their meeting, Accardo let Levinson know everything would be ok. Two days later, Levinson received all of his stolen jewelry back at the store, after Accardo's men traced the compromised alarm and the stolen jewelry to the work of burglar John Mendell.
- 1978 – Jimmy "the Bomber" Catuara was found dead near his car at Hubbard Street and Ogden Avenue. Alleged mob associate Bill Dauber was a suspect in the murder. However, he would have done the killing only at the bidding of his boss, Albert Tocco, who was allegedly trying to take over Catuara's rackets.
- January 9, 1978 – Months after Tony Accardo and his wife had left Chicago for the warmth of Palm Springs, California, Accardo "houseman" and long-time friend Michael Volpe called Accardo to inform him that his home on north Ashland Avenue, in River Forest, Illinois, had been torn apart, though nothing seemed to be stolen. Access to the house was gained, because the burglar alarm was compromised. There was no mention whether the Accardo's contacted the police about the break-in.
- January 20, 1978 – The body of Bernie Ryan, part of John Mendell's burglary crew, was found in his 1976 Lincoln Continental, in Stone Park, Illinois. He was shot four times, and his throat was slit.
- February 2, 1978 – The body of Steven Garcia, a partner of Bernie Ryan, was stabbed multiple times and his throat was slit. His body was found in the parking lot of the Sheraton O'Hare, on Mannheim Road, in the trunk of a rented car.
- February 4, 1978 – The bodies of Vincent Moretti and Donald Swanson ("Donald Renno"), suspected Accardo home burglars, were found in Swanson's Cadillac, in the parking lot of Esther's Place, at 5009 S. Central Avenue, in Stickney, Illinois. Being Italian in Chicago didn't offer Moretti any insight into the Italian culture of Chicago. For his crime against Accardo, Moretti's face was torched off, he was disemboweled and his throat was slashed like all the other Accardo-home burglars.
- February 20, 1978 – The tortured body of burglar John Mendell was found in the trunk of his 1971 Oldsmobile, at 6300 S. Campbell Avenue. Federal witness Nick Calabrese testified during the "Operation Family Secrets" trial that Mendell was lured to a place where his brother, Frank Calabrese Sr., strangled Mendell and Nick Calabrese then slashed Mendell's throat.
- April 26, 1978 – Burglar Bobby Hertogs was found in the trunk of a car at a Jewel grocery store parking lot, at 3552 Grand Avenue. He was shot multiple times and his throat was slashed.
- September 30, 1978 – Apparently, because of the just previous deluge of burglary murder victims in Chicago associated with the break-in of Tony Accardo's home, a special federal grand jury – Northern District of Illinois – was held in Chicago to get to the bottom of the situation. Accardo was the first witness and flew through his time by taking "The Fifth". The following witness was Accardo's "houseman", Michael Volpe. His testimony took quite a bit of time, and allegedly it was "significant".
- October 5, 1978 – Accardo "houseman" Michael Volpe was reported missing by a family member. He has never been seen since.
- November 10, 1978 – Because of Michael Volpe's unexplainable disappearance after testifying before a federal grand jury, which could be construed as an obstruction of justice violation, the FBI sent a team of agents to Tony Accardo's home with a search warrant. The Accardos were already wintering in Palm Springs, California, by this time. So, with permission from the Accardos' oldest daughter and the family attorney, the agents entered the home. Of the significant items seized in the raid, there was a note pad with Harry Levinson's name on it, there was a police scanner like the one burglar John Mendell used, which turned up missing from his possessions in his car, and there was $275,000 in cash wrapped in a Las Vegas bank's paper-bill wrappers, found in vault that had been built in the home. However, the cash didn't leave the premises without an intense fight with the Accardos' two daughters, with Accardo's criminal defense attorney and after telephone conferences with a couple of bail bondsmen. Ultimately, the FBI raid didn't affect Accardo at all. The U.S. Court of Appeals for the Seventh Circuit made no judgments against him and returned the $275,000 found in his vault.
- May 22, 1979 – John Borsellino's bullet-riddled body was found in a farmer's field at the Cook–Will County line. Then, the body of Gerry Carusiello was found with bullet holes in his back, in an apartment complex, in Addison, Illinois. He was Outfit front boss Joey Aiuppa's driver at the time. Both deceased men were also allegedly Outfit "hitmen" who'd killed six of the seven home burglars in John Mendell's partners, though Borsellino and Carusiello did not kill Mendell. After these two Outfit murders, there was no reported FBI raid on Tony Accardo, nor on anyone else allegedly connected with the Outfit.

=== 1980s ===
- 1980s – Operation Greylord was a federal-level investigation, followed by various corruption trials, targeting the Cook County, Illinois, judiciary (the Chicago jurisdiction).
- 1980s – "Marquette Ten": 10 police officers in Chicago's Marquette District were convicted of taking bribes from drug dealers. Among those was Chicago police officer Thomas Ambrose, the father of former U.S. Marshal John Ambrose, who was convicted 20-years later of leaking information to the Chicago Outfit about federal informant Nick Calabrese, who testified against top Chicago mobsters in the "Family Secrets" trial.
- July 2, 1980 – Alleged Outfit "hitman" and muscle man William Dauber and his wife, Charlotte, were chased in their car and shotgunned to death after leaving the Will County, Illinois, courthouse, allegedly by four Outfit tough guys, Gerald Scarpelli, William Petrocelli, Frank Calabrese Sr., and depending on the source, Joseph "Jerry" Scalise, or Ronald Jarrett. Calabrese's brother, Nick, corroborated that Frank had participated in the Daubers' killings during the 2007 "Operation Family Secrets" trial.
- September 11, 1980 – Outfit burglars Joseph Scalise and Arthur Rachel stole the Marlborough Diamond (a value of $960,000 in 1994) and $3.6 million worth of jewelry from a jewelry store in London, England, in broad daylight. The diamond has not been recovered. Scalise and Rachel each got 15 years in jail in England for the crime. They were both released in 10 years.
- February 10, 1983, Japanese, Chicago mob boss Ken Eto survived a Mafia hit and, then, testified in court against the Chicago Outfit, sending more than a dozen fellow mobsters and corrupt cops to prison. Eto's failed assassins, Jasper Campise and Johnny Gattuso, were later found dead in the trunk of one of their cars. Eto died in 2004, in the Federal Witness Protection Program.
- February 13, 1985 – Long-time mobster and West Side Outfit street boss Chuckie English, downgraded to a mob "soldier" and put in Joseph "Joey the Clown" Lombardo's crew after English's good friend and former Mob boss Sam Giancana's murder, was shot to death in an Elmwood Park, Illinois, restaurant parking lot, allegedly by an Outfit "hitman". Nobody has been charged with the murder.
- 1986 – Having been convicted of skimming $2 million from Las Vegas, casinos, Outfit bosses Jackie Cerone and Joe Aiuppa were given long prison sentences.
- January 1986 – Joe Ferriola was appointed boss of the Outfit. With the approval of his top captains and consigliere Tony Accardo, Ferriola had decided it was time to kill troublemaker Anthony Spilotro for causing a multitude of problems in Las Vegas and in Chicago.
- June 14, 1986 – Alleged Outfit Las Vegas overseer Tony Spilotro and his brother Michael, an alleged low-level mob associate, went missing. Their bodies were later found beaten and together in a shallow grave, in a cornfield, in Enos, Indiana. According to autopsy testimony given later in court, the brothers were not buried alive.
- June 15, 1986 – On Father's Day of that year, alleged Outfit boss Albert Tocco called his wife and told her to pick him up at a cornfield in Indiana. Tocco, then, told his wife he'd just buried the Spilotro brothers.
- September 1986 – Outfit juice loan collector and one-time, no-show union official John Fecarotta was gunned down while being chased on foot in front of Brown's Banquet's, Inc., 6050 W. Belmont Avenue, after he realized the "hit" he was on was for him. He bolted from his car with three bullets wounds. The fourth wound he'd received to the back of his head while running from his car to the banquet hall killed him. Apparently, the "hit" was put out because Fecarotta botched the Spilotro brothers' burial assignment. The bodies were not supposed to be found. Outfit "hitman" Nick Calabrese admitted killing Fecarotta in federal court during the "Operation Family Secrets" trial. Because of DNA evidence, Calabrese also had to admit during the trial that he was wearing the bloody glove that was dropped at the murder scene, while chasing Fecarotta, and was found by investigators and federal law enforcement, who ultimately put together the "Family Secrets" trial.
- 1988 – Outfit-associated bookmaker James Basile agreed to become a government informant, later identifying a "Mafia graveyard" at Route 83 and Bluff Road, near Darien, Illinois. Over the years, the bodies of three adult males were found there. Michael Oliver, age 29, of Chicago, a low-level mob associate went missing in November 1979. His body was recovered May 16, 1988. Robert Hatridge, age 56, of Cincinnati, Ohio, went missing in April 1979. His body was recovered June 9, 1988. Robert Charles Cruz of Kildeer, Illinois, a low-level mob associate went missing December 4, 1997. His body was found in March 2007. Cruz was the nephew of alleged Outfit front boss Joseph Ferriola and the cousin of convicted Outfit "hitman" Harry Aleman.
- December 1988 – Outfit bookie heavyweight Dominick Basso was convicted of gambling and conspiracy to commit gambling and was given 20 months probation and 70 days of work-release. Basso was the bookie linked by phone records to one-time Cincinnati Reds player-turned Cincinnati Reds manager Pete Rose, when he was accused of betting on sports in 1989. Rose has always denied the association with Basso, but eventually admitted he'd bet on sports.
- March 11, 1989 – Outfit frontman Joe Ferriola died at a Houston, Texas, hospital after receiving his second heart transplant.

=== 1990s ===
- 1990s – Operation Silver Shovel
- March 21, 1990 – Outfit gambling boss of west suburban Elmhurst, Donald Angelini, who had operated a highly successful sports betting empire along with Dominic Cortina, was arrested and sentenced to prison. Each mobster got 21 months in prison and was ordered to pay for the $1,210-a-month cost of his incarceration.
- May 27, 1992 – Tony Accardo, Chicago's Boss of Bosses, died of congestive heart failure after almost 50 years at the helm of the Outfit.
- 1996 -Rick (The Enforcer) Lentini Right hand man of Marco (The Mover) D'Amico Released from prison
- September 1997 – Feared hitman Harry Aleman, nephew of one-time Outfit frontman Joe Ferriola, was retried for the murder of Teamster William Logan and sent to prison, based on testimony by former Outfit attorney Robert Cooley and evidence which showed the first trial would never have come back with a guilty verdict, because the judge in the first case took a $10,000 bribe to acquit Aleman. So, the U.S. Constitution's "Double Jeopardy" clause would not have been in play after the first trial's "Not Guilty" verdict. This was the first time in U.S. history someone has been retried for the crime of capital murder after being acquitted.
- July 24, 1998 – One of the "wiliest and slickest crooks" in the Chicago Outfit, high ranking Greek descendant Gus Alex died of a heart attack in federal prison.
- March 28, 1999 – Outfit front-boss Angelo J. "The Hook" LaPietra died from natural causes.
- December 23, 1999 – Ronald Jarrett, a mob lieutenant to John "Johnny Apes" Monteleone, of the South Side 26th Street crew, is shot while going to a funeral. It is the first mob hit in Chicago in seven years.

== 21st Century ==
=== 2000s ===
- January 25, 2000 – Ronald Jarrett died from the gunshot wounds he sustained in late 1999.
- January 15, 2001 – William Hanhardt, the Chicago Police Department's former Chief of Detectives, was indicted by a federal grand jury on charges of masterminding a ring of Outfit-related thieves who stole $4.85 million in jewels in heists across the nation.
- November 20, 2001 – Highly feared Outfit "Juice Loan" operator and enforcer Anthony "the Hatch" Chiaramonti was shot five times and killed after a vehicle pulled-up beside him and the loanshark had words with someone inside the vehicle, outside a Brown's Chicken & Pasta in south suburban Lyons, Illinois. The murder has not been solved, though it is speculated that hitman Anthony Calabrese (no relation to Frank Calabrese), played some role in the murder, however, Calabrese died in 2018.
- September 6, 2003 – One-time Las Vegas casino overseer and alleged Outfit "hitman", downgraded to an all-around Outfit utility player after being removed from his job in Las Vegas, Marshall Caifano died of natural causes. He was 92 years old.
- April 25, 2005 – The U.S. Department of Justice's Operation Family Secrets trial indicted 15 Outfit top mobsters and associates under the Racketeer Influenced and Corrupt Organizations Act (RICO). Joseph "The Clown" Lombardo, a top Outfit leader, and Frank "the German" Schweihs evaded their indictments and became fugitives for a time.
- September 21, 2005 – After having been extradited from Greece by the Federal Bureau of Investigation, in 1989, where he fled to, reputed Outfit boss Albert Tocco died at the federal prison at Terre Haute, Indiana, after having a stroke, while serving a 200-year prison sentence for racketeering, conspiracy, extortion and tax fraud.
- December 16, 2005 – Outfit "hitman", muscleman and fugitive from justice in the Operation Family Secrets trial, Frank Schweihs was apprehended in Berea, Kentucky.
- January 13, 2006 – Outfit boss and fugitive from justice in the Operation Family Secrets trial, Joseph Lombardo Sr., was apprehended in Elmwood Park, Illinois. FBI agents found him while a mob "person of interest" was under surveillance, most likely John "No Nose" DiFronzo, but this has yet to be confirmed.
- June 14, 2006 – Former city clerk James Laski was sentenced to 24 months in prison after admitting he pocketed tens of thousands of dollars in bribes as part of the, "Hired Truck Program".
- August 31- September 4, 2006 – the deadly street gang war between Latin Kings and Gangster Disciples lead to shootout, shooting in multiple sparate incident around of Chicago in during 5 days leaves 63 people dead including 7 innocent victim
- June 18, 2007 – Aided by RICO, the Operation Family Secrets trial began in Chicago.
- September 10, 2007 – The "Family Secrets" trial's anonymous jury found guilty verdicts on all counts of the five defendants where there was corroborating evidence against the defendants and not just witness testimony against the defendants. The five defendants were Joseph Lombardo Sr., James Marcello, Frank Calabrese Sr., Paul Schiro and Anthony Doyle.
- July 23, 2008 – Alleged Outfit "hitman" and muscleman Frank Schweihs died of cancer.
- September 9, 2008 – Alleged Outfit boss Nicholas Ferriola, son of one-time Outfit frontman Joe Ferriola, was convicted of running a gambling operation and of extorting a Chicago pizza chain. He was given a three-year prison sentence.
- 2009 – High-ranking Chicago Outfit members Joseph Lombardo and James Marcello were sentenced to life imprisonment, because of their convictions in the "Family Secrets" trial.
- April 28, 2009 – Deputy U.S. Marshal John T. Ambrose was convicted of leaking secret information to the Chicago mob about federal, protected witness, mobster Nicholas Calabrese in the Chicago organized crime investigation, Operation Family Secrets. Ambrose was charged with theft of U.S. Justice Department property, disclosing confidential information and lying to federal agents who questioned him about the leak. He was however acquitted of two charges of lying to federal agents. Ambrose is the son of disgraced former CPD Officer Thomas Ambrose, who was convicted of taking bribes from area drug dealers as part of the Chicago Police Department's "Marquette Ten" scandal, in the 1980s.

=== 2010s ===
- May 15, 2010 – Hitman Harry Aleman died in state prison during his 300-year sentence, after being retried for the murder of Teamster William Logan, for which, at first, Aleman was acquitted. In a historic U.S. Supreme Court ruling following the first trial, the U.S. Constitution's "Double Jeopardy" clause, which originally forbade Aleman to be retried for the murder, was found not to apply in his first court case, because of judicial corruption in the first trial. So, Aleman was retried and found guilty.
- December 25, 2012 – Convicted in the deaths of six men and one woman during the Operation Family Secrets trial, Outfit enforcer and loanshark Frank Calabrese Sr., age 75, died at the Butner Federal Correctional Complex, in North Carolina, while serving a life sentence.
- February 27, 2013 - Mob enforcer Mario Rainone was found guilty by a federal jury on a charge of a felon in the possession of a firearm. Because he is a habitual criminal, he faces at least 15 years in prison. He was to be sentenced June 5, 2013.
- Alleged outfit boss John DiFonzo dies from Alzheimer's on May 27, 2018. Salvatore Delaurentis is believed to be the new boss.

=== 2020s ===
- May 30, 2024, Bobby 'BooBoo' English Jr shot behind the wheel of his car. Murder remains unsolved.

== See also ==
- Timeline of organized crime
- Hired Trucking Scandal
- Chicago Crime Commission
- Crime in Chicago
