= Louis Fratto =

American mobster (1907–1967)

Newspaper clip showing a photo of Louis Fratto when he appeared to testify at the Kefauver hearings.

Louis Thomas Fratto (July 17, 1907 – November 24, 1967), born Luigi Tommaso Giuseppe Fratto, also known as "Lew Farrell" and "Cockeyed Louie", was an American labor racketeer and organized crime figure in Chicago, Illinois and Des Moines, Iowa from the 1930s to 1967. He was part of the Chicago youth gang called the 42s which members included later Outfit members besides himself, Sam Giancana, "Mad" Sam DeStefano, Charles Nicoletti and other notable mobsters. In 1939, Fratto replaced Charles "Cherry Nose" Gioe as the mob boss of Iowa, making his headquarters in Des Moines. He was later implicated in the murder of Gioe, who went back to Chicago, but who later tried to reclaim his control over the rackets in Iowa. Among other things, Fratto became the Iowa distributor of "Canadian Ace Beer" which was a Capone family enterprise.

Fratto was the brother of Frank "Frankie One Ear" Fratto, a hitman for the mob, the uncle of Rudy Fratto, Jr. and Gill Valerio, and a cousin to alleged hitman, bagman, enforcer and short-lived Chicago front boss, Felix "Milwaukee Phil" Alderisio.

While in Iowa, Fratto lived and operated under the alias "Lew Farrell". He claimed that he took the name as a young man when he was a boxer. In the early 1950s Fratto/Farrell was subpoenaed by the Kefauver Organized Crime Senate Committee where he pleaded the Fifth Amendment. Although Fratto was never convicted of any crime, he was under a federal indictment for racketeering at the time of his death in 1967.

Fratto had five children with wife Carmella, and one with his first wife, Evelyn. One of his children, Frank, was a passenger along with Rocky Marciano on the 1969 Cessna crash which killed them and the pilot. Another son, Johnny, was a frequent guest on the Howard Stern Show, managed Eric the Actor and also guest starred in an episode of Deadliest Warrior as an expert on Al Capone.
