= Church League of America =

Anti-communist organization

The Church League of America was founded in Chicago in 1937 to oppose left-wing and Social Gospel influences in Christian thought in organizations. The group's founders were Frank J. Loesch, a lawyer and head of the Chicago Crime Commission, Henry Parsons Crowell, chairman of the board of Quaker Oats, and George Washington Robnett, an advertising executive. The nonprofit organization became an influential anti-communist research and advocacy group in the 1950s, under the direction of former United States Air Force Intelligence Officer Major Edgar C. Bundy. It famously denounced the mainstream National Council of Churches for being dominated by communists. In 1961, the Church League moved its headquarters to Wheaton, Illinois, where it continued its research operations, and created an extensive library of materials on subversive activity. Selling reports and access to its information was a major source of revenue for the Church League, and they also sometimes provided it without charge to like-minded researchers, including members of government and law enforcement agencies. The Church League of America dissolved in 1984.
