= Charles Nicoletti =

American mobster (1916–1977)

- Born: December 3, 1916; Chicago, Illinois, U.S.
- Died: March 29, 1977 (aged 60); Northlake, Illinois, U.S.
- Cause of death: Multiple gunshot wounds
- Resting place: Mount Carmel Cemetery (Hillside, Illinois)
- Other names: Chuckie Nicoletti; Chuckie the Typewriter
- Occupation: Mobster
- Allegiance: Chicago Outfit

Charles Nicoletti (/ˌnɪkəˈlɛti/; December 3, 1916 – March 29, 1977), also known as "Chuckie the Typewriter", was an American mobster of the Chicago Outfit, who along with his partner Felix Alderisio served as the top hitman under boss Sam Giancana before and after Giancana's rise and fall. Nicoletti was shot in the back of the head three times as he sat in his car on March 29, 1977, his murder remains unsolved.

== Early life ==
Nicoletti was born on December 3, 1916, in Chicago. He was the second son of two sons to Philip Nicoletti and Grace Alessi, Italian immigrants from Santa Caterina Villarmosa, Sicily, Italy. His family lived in Near West Side, Chicago. On February 25, 1929, at the age of 12, Nicoletti shot his father four times, allegedly in self-defense. His father who was a drunkard, attacked Charles and pursued him with a knife, he ran into his father's room, where a gun was kept in a bureau drawer. Two days later, Nicoletti was exonerated by the Cook County coroner. He dropped out of school in eighth grade and soon joined the Forty-Two Gang. At the time, the gang's members included such future Outfit members as Giancana, Sam "Teets" Battaglia, Lew Farrell, "Mad Sam" DeStefano and William "Willie Potatoes" Daddano.

In 1943, then only an associate of the mafia, Nicoletti was arrested for selling heroin to undercover narcotics officers.

== Outfit assassin ==
By the late 1950s, along with Felix Alderisio, Nicoletti was one of the most feared triggermen in Chicago and was drawing attention from the Federal Bureau of Investigation and the Chicago police. A number of times Nicoletti and Alderisio teamed up for a "hit", including one occasion on which they were discovered by police sitting on the floor in a car later dubbed "the hitmobile" by reporters. This car had special compartments where guns were stored and special switches to turn lights off at certain times. It was fitted out with bulletproof glass, license plates that switched around, and an engine tweaked to increase speed. When questioned by police the two said they were "waiting for a friend". They were taken into custody and released on bail set at $1000. The car was discovered to have been registered to a fictitious person and the address of a vacant lot. It was subsequently seized. The next day the pair were released, charged only with fictitious registration of the Ford.

A number of mob enforcers such as Anthony Spilotro and Frank Schweihs answered to Nicoletti. In April 1961 he attended the wedding of Linda Lee, Chicago boss Tony Accardo's daughter, and Michael Palermo. In 1962, Nicoletti took part in an infamous torture case. He, Alderisio, Carlo "Duke" Olandese and Tony "the Ant" Spilotro, had kidnapped 24-year-old Billy McCarthy, a thug who had killed two Outfit associates with the help of Jimmy Miraglia, also age 24. The three men started torturing McCarthy to find out the name of his accomplice. Spilotro had placed the man's head in an industrial vise and started squeezing it tighter and tighter. Suddenly, McCarthy's eye popped completely out of its socket. At that point, he revealed his accomplice's name; then both men were killed. Years later, Tony Spilotro told this story to his friend Frank Cullotta. Spilotro was impressed by Nicoletti's reaction to the gory scene: "Boy, this is a heartless guy. He was eating pasta when Billy's eye popped out".

In the 1960s, Nicoletti was questioned by two FBI agents, including Agent William F. Roemer Jr., to see whether they could develop Nicoletti as an informant against the Outfit. According to Roemer, Nicoletti gave him the names of several car dealerships he worked at and was very cordial; apparently, all the employment leads checked out. He stated that as far as he was aware, Nicoletti never flipped and never talked to the FBI again, though there was eventually talk in Chicago that Nicoletti had flipped.

It has been alleged that Nicoletti was involved in as many as 20 mob hits during his career as a hitman. In 2010, Playboy magazine published an article by Hillel Levin in which Nicoletti was implicated in the assassination of President John F. Kennedy by James Files, an inmate within the Illinois Department of Corrections, and Chauncey Marvin Holt. In his memoir Double Cross, Chuck Giancana, brother of Sam Giancana, claimed that at the Lilac Lodge in Chicago, April 1969, Nicoletti informed him that Sam Giancana was involved in the assassinations of President Kennedy and his brother Robert F. Kennedy in 1968. He further stated that his brother claimed that Nicoletti and Richard Cain were placed at opposite ends of the Texas School Book Depository to shoot at Kennedy.

== Death ==
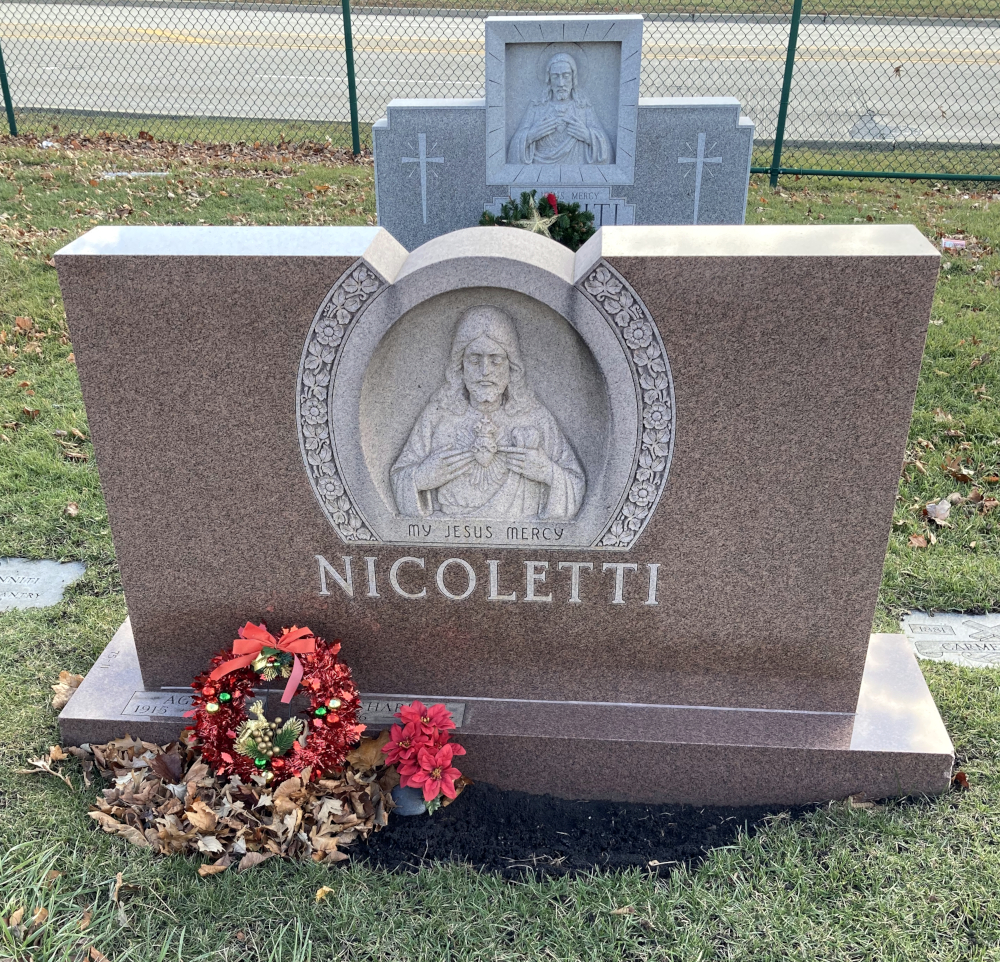
Nicoletti's grave at Mount Carmel Cemetery

On March 29, 1977, Nicoletti was shot three times in the back of his head while waiting in his Oldsmobile in the parking lot of the Golden Horns Restaurant in suburban Northlake, Illinois. He was brought to the Northlake Community Hospital, where he died six to seven hours later. Government prosecutors of Chicago Outift boss Joey Aiuppa told the courts that Aiuppa had personally approved the killing. Nicoletti was a strong supporter of Sam Giancana, killed two years earlier. It has been hypothesized that Nicoletti's murder may have been fallout from the Giancana murder. On the other hand, Nicoletti was to testify before the House Select Committee on Assassinations, indicating that he may have been killed to prevent him from testifying.

Nicoletti's car was never turned off and consequently overheated and caught on fire, causing initial incorrect press reports that his car was firebombed. Nicoletti was due to testify before the House Select Committee on Assassinations at the time of his death. George de Mohrenschildt was likewise scheduled to testify before that committee and died on the same day.

According to Roemer, Chicago mob assassin Harry Aleman is the suspected hitman.

Nicoletti is buried at Mount Carmel Cemetery in Hillside, Illinois.

Dermot Mulroney plays Nicoletti in the movie November 1963 (2026).

== See also ==
- List of homicides in Illinois § Organized crime
- List of unsolved murders (1900–1979)
