= William Russo =

William Russo may refer to:

- William Daddano Sr. (1912–1975), also known as William Russo, American mobster
- William Russo (musician) (1928–2003), American jazz musician
- Bill Russo (American football), head college football coach
- Jigsaw (Marvel Comics), a villain from Marvel Comics, born William "Billy" Russo
