= Frank Schweihs =

American gangster (1932-2008)

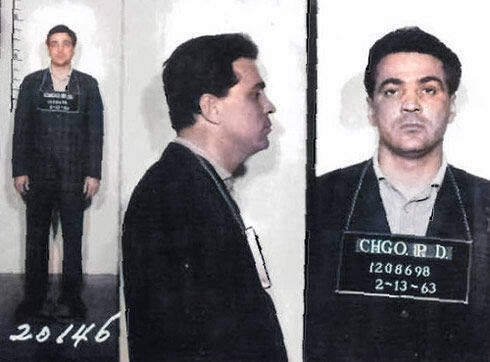
Frank Schweihs' mugshot, February 1963

Francis John Schweihs (February 7, 1932 – July 23, 2008), aka "Frank the German", was an American mobster, who worked for the Outfit, the organized crime family of Chicago. At the time of his death, federal prosecutors planned to indict him for numerous crimes, including murder. It is believed he had participated in, or had knowledge of, many murders going back decades, including brothers Anthony "Tony the Ant" Spilotro and Michael Spilotro, Allen Dorfman of the Teamsters Union, a disgraced Chicago cop, Outfit associate and informant Dick Cain, Outfit boss Salvatore "Sam," "Mooney" Giancana, loanshark Sam "Mad Sam" DeStefano, Outfit hitman Charles "Chuckie" Nicoletti, John Roselli and others.

Schweihs was convicted of extortion in 1989 and sentenced to 13 years and one month in prison; he was also ordered to pay $42,900 in fines and restitution.

Schweihs operated with several crews, one of them the "Chinatown Crew" also known as the "26th Street Crew." Its operations were run out of the Old Neighborhood Italian American Club, originally on west 26th Street, in Chicago. Its founder, Angelo J. "The Hook" LaPietra, and Schweihs' partner skimmed $2 million from Las Vegas casinos in the 1980s and built a new massive club structure on West 31st Street, in Chicago. In 1991, Schweihs collected $12,000 a month from the On Leong, in Chinatown, to allow them to run their casino there. The money was delivered to the Italian Club.

The last known city of residence of Schweihs was Dania Beach, Florida, before he became a fugitive in April 2005. He was a fugitive along with Joseph "Joey the Clown" Lombardo, who each went their separate ways; however, Schweihs was eventually caught in Berea, Kentucky, on December 16, 2005, and less than a month later, Lombardo was caught on January 13, 2006, in the Chicago area. Schweihs' trial was separated from the other defendants' because of his poor health (he had cancer). His co-defendants were convicted in the original trial in 2007. Schweihs remained in jail pending his trial. After his health had been judged to have improved, he was finally scheduled to go on trial in October 2008.

== Personal life ==
James Weiss, a son-in-law of former Cook County Assessor Joseph Berrios, is confirmed to have had ties to Schweihs.

== Death ==
Schweihs died in Thorek Hospital, while also still remaining in federal custody, on July 23, 2008, from complications related to his cancer.

Schweihs' daughter, Nora Schweihs, is a castmember of Mob Wives Chicago. She had her father's body exhumed in July 2012 in order to prove the corpse's identity. Schweihs' remains were eventually cremated.
