= Felix Alderisio =

American mobster (1912–1971)

- Felix Alderisio
- Born: April 26, 1912; Yonkers, New York, U.S.
- Died: September 25, 1971 (aged 59); Marion, Illinois, U.S.
- Resting place: Queen of Heaven Cemetery, Hillside, Illinois
- Other name: Milwaukee Phil
- Occupation: Crime boss
- Allegiance: Chicago Outfit

Felix Anthony "Milwaukee Phil" Alderisio (April 26, 1912 – September 25, 1971) was an American enforcer, bagman, hitman and burglar for the Chicago Outfit. He was underboss to Sam Giancana during the 1960s and front boss from 1967 to his imprisonment in 1969.

== Early life ==
Felix Anthony Alderisio was born on April 26, 1912, in Yonkers, New York, to Italian immigrants Dominico Alderisio and Pauline Maturese. Alderisio moved with his family to Milwaukee, where, according to some reports, he fought as a boxer under the name of "Milwaukee Phil".

He began his criminal career in Chicago as a teenager during the Prohibition era. One of his early arrests was for vagrancy; he frequently waited outside Outfit boss Al Capone's Lexington Hotel headquarters in the hope of getting a job as a messenger.

In the early 1930s, Alderisio's maternal cousin Louis Fratto brought Alderisio into the Outfit. Alderisio began working with Sam Battaglia and John Marshall Caifano as an enforcer. Rising steadily through the ranks during the Great Depression, Alderisio soon gained a reputation for brutality. By the end of the decade, Alderisio was working under Jake "Greasy Thumb" Guzik, the Outfit's financial expert, as a bagman delivering payoffs to Chicago judges and police officials.

== Mob enforcer ==
Alderisio was arrested at least 36 times over several decades on charges including assault and battery, bombing, racketeering, loansharking, illegal gambling, hijacking, narcotics, counterfeiting, bootlegging, bribery, extortion, and murder-for-hire. However, Alderisio usually avoided prosecution because of the Outfit's strong political connections.

In the 1950s, Alderisio started working as an enforcer with Charles "Chuckie" Nicoletti. Alderisio was suspected in carrying out thirteen or fourteen contract killings for the Outfit. In April 1961 he attended the wedding of Linda Lee, Chicago boss Tony Accardo's daughter, and Michael Palermo.

On May 2, 1962, police questioned the two men in a black car that they had customized into a so-called "hit mobile". The car had special switches that independently controlled the headlights and tail lights to make it more difficult for them to be tailed at night; there was also a hidden compartment with clamps for shotguns, rifles, and pistols. They were taken into custody and released on bail set at $1000. The car was discovered to have been registered to a fictitious person and the address of a vacant lot. It was subsequently seized. The next day the pair were released, charged only with fictitious registration of the Ford.

That same month, Alderisio participated in an infamous mob torture incident. After a barroom fight, two small-time criminals, Billy McCarthy and Jimmy Miraglia, had ambushed and killed Outfit associates Ronald Scavo and Philip Scavo. Alderisio, Nicoletti, and Anthony Spilotro captured McCarthy and tortured him to provide Miraglia's name. They finally placed McCarthy's head in a vise and tightened it until one of his eyes popped out of its socket. At that point, McCarthy named Miraglia. Later that week, McCarthy and Miraglia were found dead with their throats cut.

== Criminal enterprises ==
Alderisio headed a group of cat burglars that operated in Chicago's upscale Gold Coast district. These thieves specialized in rare gems and jewelry, which they fenced to Outfit-controlled jewelry stores and wholesalers. Alderisio resided in the Gold Coast for a time; his unsuspecting neighbors were his targets.

During the 1950s and 1960s, Alderisio's crew picked up payoffs from North Side restaurants and nightclubs. He also served as the principal bagman for North Side bookmaking operations, delivering millions of dollars in payments each week to the Outfit leadership.

Alderisio owned several restaurants, meat packing firms, small hotels, Rush Street nightclubs, bordellos, and striptease joints in the Chicago area. Alderisio also had extensive interests in Milwaukee, where he was “a partner in just about everything that Frank Balistrieri has,” according to an informant in 1965.

== Rise to acting boss ==
Alderisio advanced within the Chicago Outfit during the 1950s under the leadership of Paul Ricca. Serving directly under Giancana and later under Gus "Gussie" Alex, Alderisio was identified by federal authorities in the early 1960s as a high-ranking member of the Outfit.

Alderisio's alliances, particularly with Sam Giancana, who assumed Outfit leadership in 1957, gave him enforcement responsibilities, requiring him to handle sensitive assignments and allowing him to wield influence over crew operations. By the mid-1960s, as Giancana faced exile and legal woes, Alderisio's record of loyalty and trustworthiness enabled him to briefly assume acting leadership responsibilities as front boss, following the conviction of Sam Battaglia. He was not, however, popular with the "rank-and-file" Chicago mobsters.

During the Permanent Subcommittee on Investigations of the U.S. Senate Committee on Government Operations investigations of organized crime, Alderisio would plead the Fifth Amendment to the U.S. Constitution against self-incrimination 23 times and refuse to testify.

== Prosecution and imprisonment ==
In 1964, Alderisio and Irwin Weiner were tried but later acquitted for extorting a Miami businessman. Weiner and Alderisio were particularly close as Weiner had known him since he was 13. Weiner owned a bail bonds company and would post bail for Alderisio's underlings. In 1967 they became partners in the International Fiberglass Company.

In 1965, Alderisio was convicted, along with his long-time acquaintances Willie Alderman and Ruby Kolod, of conspiring to transmit communications containing threats to kidnap or injure persons in interstate commerce, stemming from an extortion scheme targeting Denver lawyer Robert Sunshine. Alderisio, who had been described by Kolod as "a Chicago lawyer" who would not be coming for the purpose of suing Sunshine, told Sunshine "Ruby sent us. We came here to kill you." The case marked an early federal push against organized crime figures using interstate threat statutes, before the enactment of the Racketeer Influenced and Corrupt Organizations Act, with evidence drawn from the FBI's electronic surveillance of Kolod's offices in the Desert Inn in Las Vegas and Alderisio's place of business in Chicago.

Alderisio appealed his conviction on a number of grounds, including his claim that the evidence on which the government relied was tainted by the FBI's admittedly unlawful wiretaps. His case reached the United States Supreme Court, which ruled that Alderisio did not have standing to challenge the evidence derived from the surveillance of Kolos's offices based on the violation of Kolod's Fourth Amendment rights, but that he was entitled to limited access to the records of the unlawful surveillance of his business premises following in camera review of surveillance logs by the trial court. On remand the Tenth Circuit upheld the convictions.

Following exhaustion of his appeals, the Court ordered Alderisio to four and one-half years' imprisonment plus a $7,500 fine. Alderisio's imprisonment led to Joey Aiuppa's replacement of him as front boss.

== Personal life and death ==
Alderisio married Wanda C. Paprocki on April 8, 1943 in Miami Beach, Florida. They had one son, Dominic (July 10, 1947 - November 25, 1974).

Often traveling abroad (either on vacation or establishing connections for smuggling heroin into the United States), Alderisio frequently visited Turkey, Italy, and Greece. He was passionate about classical ruins, spending hours photographing them. During one meeting with Giancana that was recorded by law enforcement, Alderisio spent about 20 minutes describing ruins he had recently seen in Europe. Finally, Giancana lost his patience and yelled:

Phil, goddammit! Ruins! I got coppers coming out of my eyeballs and you sit there telling me about ruins! Listen to me, Phil, listen real good! Ruins ain't garbage! Forget about them goddamn ruins!

On September 25, 1971, Felix Alderisio died from natural causes at the United States Penitentiary, in Marion, Illinois. Accardo, Aiuppa and other Outfit members attended his funeral.

== Notes ==
American Mafia
Preceded by Jackie Cerone	Chicago Outfit Boss; 1969–1971	Succeeded by Joseph Aiuppa
