= Jack Zuta =

American accountant and political fixer

John U. Zuta
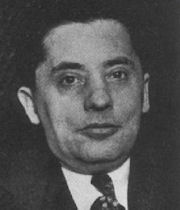
- Chicago Police Department mugshot of Zuta
- Born: February 15, 1888; Russian Empire
- Died: August 1, 1930 (aged 42); Delafield, Wisconsin, U.S.
- Cause of death: Gunshot
- Other name: Zoota
- Occupations: Accountant, Political "fixer", Brothel owner, Junk dealer
- Allegiance: Chicago Outfit; North Side Gang
- Criminal charges: Brothel operation; Conspiracy to murder

John U. Zuta (February 15, 1888 – August 1, 1930) was an accountant and political "fixer" for the Chicago Outfit and the North Side Gang.

== Early life ==
Zuta (also spelled as "Zoota") was born on February 18, 1888, in the Russian Empire to a peasant family who practiced Orthodox Judaism. He immigrated to the United States around 1913. Living in Chicago, Zuta worked as a junk dealer on the West Side before becoming involved in prostitution. He eventually operated several brothels on west Madison Street. However he was ordered to hand over his operation to his competitors Mike "The Pike" Heitler and the Guzik Brothers, Harry and Jake "Greasy Thumb" Guzik.

== Mob accountant ==
Zuta began working for Al Capone in the mid-1920s. He helped contribute $50,000 of Capone's money to Chicago Mayor William Hale Thompson's reelection campaign in 1927. However, Zuta defected to Bugs Moran's North Side Gang during the gang war between Capone and Moran.

In June 1930, Moran and Zuta allegedly ordered the assassination of mobbed-up Chicago Tribune reporter Jake Lingle after Lingle demanded a cut of their illegal gambling operations on the Chicago Outfit's behalf. After the murder (for which former Egan's Rats gangster Leo Vincent Brothers was convicted), Zuta was arrested and questioned by police. He was released the next day. While being given a police escort the police cruiser was fired on by several unidentified gunmen. The attackers killed two bystanders before being driven off by police. Zuta fled Chicago, and hid out in Upper Nemahbin Lake, west of Milwaukee, living under the alias "J. H. Goodman". Zuta was shot to death, most likely by the Chicago Outfit in revenge for the murder of Lingle, on August 1, 1930, at a roadhouse in Delafield, Wisconsin. He lies buried in the Jewish cemetery located in Middlesboro, Kentucky.

== Aftermath ==
Zuta's death exposed a large amount of political corruption in Illinois. Zuta, a meticulous record keeper, had much information later found in various safe deposit boxes. This information lead to the confiscation of a large whiskey shipment intended for Moran and to information about police raids on several breweries, as well as detailing kickbacks by the North Side Gang to both state and city officials.

Some of the officials implicated were:

- Chicago Alderman Dorsey Crowe
- Board of Education executive Nate DeLue
- Judge Joseph W. Schulman
- ex-Judge Emanuel Eller
- Chicago Police Department Sergeant Martin C. Mulvihill
- Evanston Police Chief William O. Freeman
- Illinois Senator Harry W. Starr

All denied involvement, however, particularly Crowe and Starr, who insisted that the money was campaign contributions rather than bribes. In reference to Lingle's murder, the name, "Zuta", later became slang for a revenge killing. In 1931, after a $50,000 bounty was placed on his head, Capone joked, "Nobody's gonna' 'Zuta' me."

== See also ==
- List of homicides in Wisconsin
