= Mike Heitler =

American gangster

Michael "The Pike" Heitler (1876 – April 30, 1931) was a Prohibition gangster involved in prostitution for the Chicago Outfit. A Jewish mob boss born in what is today Ukraine, Heitler is buried at Waldheim Cemetery Co. in Forest Park, Illinois.

== Biography ==
Heitler began operating brothels in Chicago during the early 1900s based out of west Madison Street. By 1911, he had become a leading crime figure and a top lieutenant to Chicago racketeer Jacob "Mont" Tennes, later driving rival Jack Zuta out of business, with then ally Jake "Greasy Thumb" Guzik. Although arrested briefly for white slavery, Heitler continued to run independently of James "Big Jim" Colosimo and later independently of Johnny "The Fox" Torrio, until the early 1920s, after the formation of the Chicago Outfit.

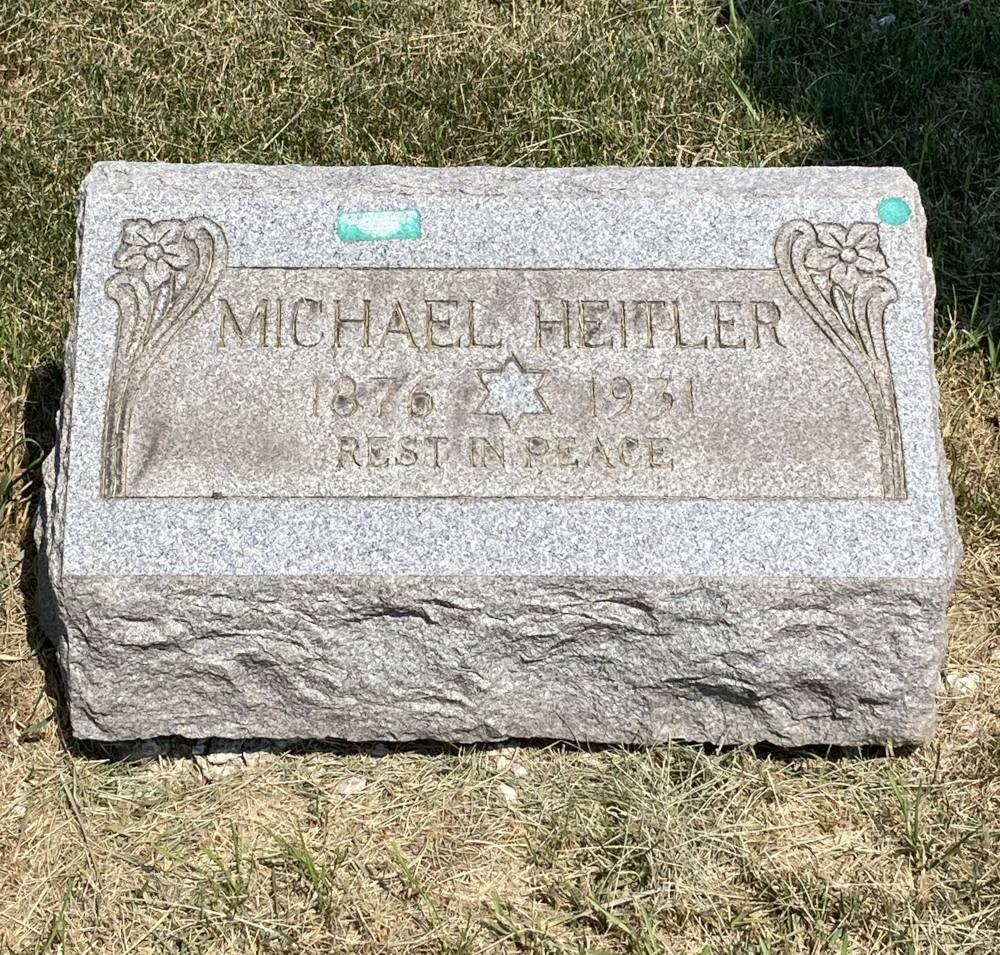
Heitler's grave at Waldheim Cemetery Co.

Reluctantly joining Capone's organization, Heitler began informing Chicago police of criminal activities after rival Guzik gained control of the organization's prostitution operations, informing Judge John H. Lyle of extortion and other illegal activities in the Four Deuces nightclub. Heitler was soon found out and fired by Capone after he received a letter to the state's attorney office detailing his prostitution operations. Heitler continued to send information to police later claiming Capone's involvement in the death of Chicago Tribune reporter Jake Lingle, which, the letter was received by Capone. Heitler may have also been involved in the conviction of Guzik and Ralph "Bottles" Capone for tax evasion, in 1930. Heitler was last seen with Capone associate Lawrence "Dago" Mangano and was later found dead in a burned ice house on the Spencer Otis Farm at Baker Lake April 29, 1931.
