= Mario Anthony DeStefano =

American mobster (1915–1975)

Mario Anthony DeStefano (March 21, 1915 – August 12, 1975) was an American mobster and "made" member of the Chicago Outfit who was a leading loan shark in the organization.

Born Mario Antonio DeStefano, he later anglicized his middle name. DeStefano grew up in Little Italy, Chicago, with his brothers, including future "mob associate" Sam "Mad Sam" DeStefano. In 1935, at age 20, Mario DeStefano was convicted of murder and sentenced to 30 years in prison. In 1949, after serving 14 years, he was released. DeStefano soon partnered with his brother, Sam DeStefano, in a loansharking operation, one of the earliest in Chicago history. By the end of the 1950s, the DeStefanos dominated the racket in Chicago. In 1955, police questioned the two brothers regarding the September 1955 death of their younger brother, Michael DeStefano; however, no charges were ever filed.

Although the Outfit controlled the DeStefano crew's loanshark operations, the Chicago mob's ruling eschelon allowed the DeStefanos a great deal of autonomy in exchange for a percentage of the earnings. This independence might be attributed to Sam's DeStefano relationship with Outfit leader Paul "The Waiter" Ricca, who DeStefano met when both were serving time for separate crimes in Leavenworth Federal Penitentiary in the 1940s. During the 1960s, Mario DeStefano was the primary enforcer for the crew. In 1964, DeStefano resided in Westchester, Illinois.

In 1973, the DeStefanos and Anthony (Tony) "The Ant" Spilotro were charged with the November 19, 1963 murder of DeStefano underling loan shark Leo Foreman. Mario DeStefano was eventually convicted in the Foreman murder and sentenced to 20-to-40 years in prison. Spilotro was acquitted. While out on bail during the trial, Sam DeStefano was murdered in his garage. Police considered Mario DeStefano and Spilotro to be suspects in Sam DeStefano's murder, but the two men were never charged. On July 9, 1975, Mario DeStefano's sentence in the Foreman murder was overturned by the Illinois Appellate Court. While awaiting retrial, DeStefano died on August 12, 1975, of a heart attack.

== Bibliography ==
- Devito, Carlo. Encyclopedia of International Organized Crime. New York: Facts On File, Inc., 2005. ISBN 0-8160-4848-7
