= Frank J. Loesch =

American lawyer (1852–1944)

Frank Joseph Loesch (April 9, 1852 – July 31, 1944) was a prominent Chicago attorney, reformer and a founder of the Chicago Crime Commission, which attempted to combat widespread corruption and organized crime related violence.

== Biography ==
Loesch was born in Buffalo, New York, on April 9, 1852, the son of Frank and Marie Eva (Fisher) Loesch. His father came from Forchheim am Kaiserstuhl in Baden-Württemberg, Germany. Both emigrated in 1845. Loesch moved to Chicago in 1870, where he entered Union College of Law while continuing his bookkeeping position with Western Union. He witnessed the 1871 Great Chicago Fire and wrote an extensive first-hand account, "Personal Experiences during the Chicago Fire." He received his LL.B. degree from Northwestern Law School, in 1874.

In his 70-year legal career, Loesch represented numerous corporate and individual clients, including several major railroads and the American Medical Association.

In 1908, Loesch was appointed Special State's Attorney for Cook County. He prosecuted frauds committed during the first direct primary election in Cook County. The experience made him an ardent crusader against what he termed the alliance between crime and politics.

In 1919, Loesch was one of the organizers of the Chicago Crime Commission. He was made an executive member of the commission in 1922, became its president in 1928 and served five terms as commission president. He was named president emeritus of the commission in 1938. Loesch spent much of his career fighting organized crime in the city, particularly against the romantic image of the gangster commonly portrayed by the media of the time. Loesch believed that changing the public's attitude towards organized crime figures such as Dean O'Banion and Al Capone was a crucial part in effective law enforcement; and, Loesch was credited with coining the term, "public enemy," later used by FBI Director J. Edgar Hoover.

However, Loesch reportedly held considerable influence among Chicago's underworld and was apparently able to warn Capone and other Italian mobsters against further gang warfare, especially following the violence surrounding the 1928 Republican "pineapple primary." Loesch was appointed Chief Special Assistant Attorney General of Illinois to act in place of the regular State's Attorney in the investigations of frauds, bombings, kidnappings and murders committed in connection with the primary elections of April 1928. Later in the same year, he was chief prosecutor in the murder case of Octavius C. Granady, an African American lawyer and candidate for Committeeman of the "Bloody" Twentieth Ward. Loesch was also responsible for the arrests of many of the city's Irish-American gangsters and bootleggers.

In 1929, President Herbert Hoover appointed Loesch as one of the eleven primary members of the Wickersham Commission on issues relating to law enforcement, criminal activity, police brutality, and Prohibition.

Loesch died in Cooperstown, New York, on July 31, 1944, aged 92. His grandson was lawyer and politician Harrison Loesch.
