= Bagman =

Person designated to collect money or run errands

The term bagman (or bag man) has different meanings in different countries.

One group of definitions centers on the idea of traveling. In British usage, "bagman" is a term for a traveling salesman, first known from 1808. In Australian usage, it can mean a tramp or homeless man.

However, many other definitions center around money. People involved in political fundraising, soliciting donations, or otherwise involved in the financial side of a political campaign may be referred to as a bagman. This usage has led to an expansion of meaning to include those who solicit bribes for public officials.

In organized crime, a bagman may be involved in protection rackets or the numbers game, collecting or distributing the money involved. When acting as an intermediary in such activities, a bagman may also be called a delivery boy or running man, and may receive a fraction of the money collected. Journalist Jack Shafer defines "bag man" as a slang term "for criminals who perform deliveries and run errands for other criminals". In criminal operations involving disbursements of cash as illegal payments for some service, a bagman delivers the money, often cash, to the recipient, such as Fred LaRue in the Watergate scandal.

== See also ==
- Batman (military)
- Courier
