= William Daddano Sr. =

American mobster (1912–1975)

William Daddano Sr. (December 28, 1912 – September 9, 1975), also known as "William Russo" and "Willie Potatoes," was a top enforcer and loan shark for the Chicago Outfit and a participant in some high-profile robberies.

== Early years ==
Born in Chicago, Illinois, Daddano became a member of the Forty-Two Gang, a local street gang from Maxwell Street on Chicago's West Side. Gang members included such future Outfit heavyweights as Sam Giancana (also known as "Momo" or "Mooney") and Sam Battaglia. He lived in North Riverside, Illinois with his wife Mary and five children. He never had a legitimate means of employment or business known to the FBI.

== Enforcer and mobster ==
By 1936, at age 24, Daddano had accumulated an extensive criminal record in the 42-Gang, including nine counts of bank robbery, larceny and auto theft. Giancana and Battaglia eventually recruited Daddano into the Chicago Outfit. In 1944, Daddano was arrested for attempting to steal three million war ration stamps. While police suspected that the Outfit was behind this crime, Daddano refused to name his accomplices. After World War II, Daddano became a leading enforcer for The Outfit. He also controlled illegal gambling operations in Dupage, Will and Kane counties and in the Chicago suburbs of Cicero and Berwyn.

Though a "made man" and valued "capo" in the Chicago Outfit. Daddano has been described as a "ruthless and pitiless killer" who was refined in torture with ice picks and blowtorches, keeping victims alive for hours while torturing them. In 1963, he had left a Capone-era mobster's wake with DeStefano, in his Cadillac, with Chicago police in hot pursuit of the speeding car. Daddano was the main suspect in at least seven murders.

Daddano also had the responsibility to know who every Chicago burglar was, so that the Chicago Outfit could take a "street tax ('Tribute')" percentage of everything he stole.

== Legitimate enterprises ==
A legitimate business that Daddano owned and operated in much of Chicago was a garbage collection company named, "West Suburban Scavanger [sic?] Service".

== Prison and death ==
In May 1966, Daddano was arrested and tried for hijacking $1 million in silver bullion, but was later acquitted. He was later arrested for conspiracy to rob a Franklin Park Bank, a heist planned by him six years earlier. Daddano was sentenced to 15 years in prison, in the Marion, Illinois, federal penitentiary, a supermax prison at the time. The prison was downgraded in 2006.

On September 9, 1975, he died of natural causes in prison, three months after Giancana was executed in the basement of his home by someone who has never been positively identified.
