= Chicago Crime Commission =

US non-partisan civic watchdog organization

The Chicago Crime Commission is an independent, non-partisan civic watchdog organization of business leaders dedicated to educating the public about the dangers of organized criminal activity, especially organized crime, street gangs and the tools of their trade: drugs, guns, public corruption, money laundering, identity theft and gambling, founded in 1919. The police, the judicial system, politicians, prosecutors and citizens rely on the Chicago Crime Commission to provide advice on crime issues and to communicate vital information to the public.

== Summary ==
Founded just before Prohibition in the Roaring '20s, local businessmen formed the Chicago Crime Commission to address the lawlessness prevalent in Chicago during the time. The businessmen who founded the crime commission did not think of themselves as a reform organization but saw crime as business work to which they applied business methods. The backlog of murder cases awaiting trial was reduced, while the public corruption and organized criminal activities of the Chicago Outfit were exposed. In 1930, the Commission first brought about the Public Enemies list, with Chicago gangster Al Capone as "Public Enemy Number One." The idea of such a list was co-opted by the FBI as the FBI's Ten Most Wanted Fugitives list.

Today, the Commission's primary role is to ensure that business, government and law enforcement work together to address problems caused by organized criminal enterprises by:

- Publishing The Gang Book, a training tool for law enforcement on adult Chicago area gangs which includes full color photographs of the "leaders" of "prominent" street gangs as well as their commonly identifiable characteristics (i.e., graffiti and markings, clothing, tattoos, and hand signs or "sets");
- Publishing Friend and Foe, described as "an exhibit of visual materials that highlight some aspects" of the "history of crime, citizen action, and law enforcement in Chicago" (Forward, p. iii). The work provides "insight into the "Chicago Outfit", public corruption, street gangs, drugs, and the evolution of crime fighting";
- Offering tools for citizens to report public corruption and crime anonymously to the right law enforcement agency through an interactive website and hotline;
- Promoting Project Safe Neighborhoods (PSN), a "promising" comprehensive antiviolence initiative. In their national evaluation, McGarrell and colleagues (2010) found cities who implemented PSN experienced an average 4.1 percent decline in violent crime, while non-PSN cities experienced a 0.9 percent decline;
- Advising statewide and local partnerships on how to improve communications to prevent and respond to everyday crimes and organized criminal activities;
- Conducting research and providing analysis on crime issues, specializing in those businesses associated with organized criminal activity; and
- Offering a comprehensive organized crime library.

== Highlights ==
- The Chicago Crime Commission spearheaded educating Illinois citizens on the dangers of a government-owned casino as the Illinois Governor and the Illinois General Assembly sought to pass legislation creating a Chicago-owned casino, increasing the total number of casinos, allowing slot machines at the racetracks and massively expanding gambling throughout Illinois.
- The Commission's then President, James W. Wagner, testified as an expert witness in the federal government's 2007 prosecution of Chicago organized crime in the case known as the "Family Secrets" trial.
- The Commission monitors the federal prosecutions of Illinois' alleged pay-to-play political insiders and the general public corruption allegations levied against government officials throughout Illinois, including the trials involving former Governor George H. Ryan, his former Chief-of-Staff, Scott Fawell and current Chicago businessman Antoin Rezko.

== Publications and archives ==
Owning one of the oldest and most complete historical archives on organized crime in the 20th and 21st century, the Commission provides an important historical record of criminal activity and public corruption for professional research and education. The Chicago Crime Commission maintains current information on crime issues and criminal activities involving organized crime, gangs and public corruption. Recent publications include: The Gang Book (2012) and Friend and Foe (2007).

- The Gang Book is a 272-page overview of adult Chicago area gangs which includes gang "histories", full color photographs of the "leaders" of "prominent" street gangs, as well as their commonly identifiable characteristics (i.e., graffiti and markings, clothing, tattoos, and hand signs or "sets"). Designed as a training tool, the Commission claims to have "donated over 4,000 copies" of the 2012 edition to local and statewide law enforcement agencies as well as other "organizations in the criminal justice field".
- Friend and Foe is a 297-page "exhibit of visual materials that highlight some aspects" of the "history of crime, citizen action, and law enforcement in Chicago" (Forward, p. iii). The work provides "insight into the "Chicago Outfit", public corruption, street gangs, drugs, and the evolution of crime fighting". It includes a decade-by-decade pictorial of Chicago's crime problems, included "original photographs, cartoons, [newspaper] headlines, lithographs, fingerprints, drawings" (Forward, p. iii) and "previously unseen documents" from the Commission's historical archive.

== Crime reporting ==
A non-government agency, the Commission acts an intermediary between citizens and law enforcement to help initiate investigations. The Anonymous Public Corruption Reporting Hotline is a web-based public corruption and crime reporting system that gives government employees and concerned citizens an effective way to reach law enforcement anonymously. The Anonymous Crime Reporting Hotline accepts tips on general and gang-related criminal activities.

== Public activities ==
The Chicago Crime Commission presents and sponsors presentations on current law enforcement issues and criminal justice issues, continuing its track record of exposing corruption and organized criminal activities and encouraging public debate on issues of public safety and national security. The Chicago Crime Commission hosts at least four events a year open to the public: (1) a mid-year member luncheon, (2) a golf benefit; (3) an annual dinner benefit; and (4) a holiday luncheon. The Commission accepts* sponsorship and event purchases online at http://www.chicagocrimecommission.org (*subject to availability and security clearance).

== Funding and expenses ==
As a 501(c)(3) charitable organization, the Commission receives funding solely from private citizens and businesses committed to improving the quality of public safety in their communities.

Per the Illinois Attorney General's "Charitable Database Search", the Commission reported an annual income of roughly $500,000 in 2014 and 2015 [Reg. Number: 01008852; EIN: 360898425]. In 2014, Executive Director Joseph Ways was compensated $167,000 while retiring Vice-President Arthur Bilek collected a salary of $87,000.
