= Sam DeStefano =

American mobster (1909-1973)

- Chicago Police Department mugshot of Mad Sam DeStefano
- Born: September 13, 1909; Streator, Illinois, U.S.
- Died: April 14, 1973 (aged 63); Chicago, Illinois, U.S.
- Cause of death: Dismemberment from a shotgun wound
- Other name: "Mad Sam"
- Occupations: Loan shark, contract killer
- Allegiance: Chicago Outfit
- Convictions: Rape (1927); Bank robbery (1933) Conspiracy (1965); Threatening a witness (1972)
- Criminal charges: Illegal possession of firearms by a felon (1972); Murder (1972 or 1973)
- Penalty: 3 years in prison (1927); 40 years in prison (1933); 3-5 years in prison (1965); 3.5 years in prison (1972)

Samuel "Mad Sam" DeStefano (September 13, 1909 − April 14, 1973) was an American mobster who was associated with the Chicago Outfit. He was one of the organization's most notorious loan sharks and sociopathic killers. Chicago-based Federal Bureau of Investigation (FBI) agents, such as William F. Roemer Jr., considered DeStefano to be the worst torture-murderer in the history of the United States. The Outfit used the mentally unstable and sadistic DeStefano for the torture-murders of Leo Foreman and Arthur Adler, as well as many others. At least one Outfit insider, Charles Crimaldi, claimed DeStefano was a devil worshipper.

== Early years ==
Samuel DeStefano Jr. was born in Streator, Illinois, into the Italian-American family of Samuel DeStefano Sr. and Rosalie DeStefano (née Brasco), both of whom had been born in Italy and had immigrated to the United States in 1903. DeStefano Sr. was a laborer and, later on in life, a grocer and real estate salesman who died of natural causes in 1942, at age 74. Rosalie was a housewife, who throughout her life was supported by the contributions of her children. She died in October 1960. In all, the DeStefanos had seven children, three sons and four daughters. Not long after his birth, Sam DeStefano and his family moved to Herrin, Illinois, where his father worked in the local coal mine. After the labor-related turmoil surrounding the Herrin Massacre, the DeStefano family moved north to Chicago's Little Italy.

One of the earliest reports on DeStefano is from September 12, 1926, when he was arrested in Chicago and turned over to the Niles Police Department as a fugitive for breaking out of jail. On July 1, 1927, several hundred Westside gang members showed up threatening violence against a police sergeant for arresting DeStefano and shooting DeStefano's associate Harry Casgrovi.

In November 1927, DeStefano and fellow gang member Ralph Orlando were in court on charges of attacking a 17-year-old girl. The prosecution claimed that on August 19, 1927, the girl was forced into an automobile and driven to a garage where she was sexually assaulted by seven men. Orlando and DeStefano were both found guilty of rape; Orlando was sentenced to ten years, while DeStefano was sentenced to three.

In 1930, DeStefano joined the Forty-Two Gang, an infamous Chicago street gang led by future Outfit boss Salvatore "Sam" Giancana. DeStefano soon became involved in bootlegging and gambling. In 1932, he was wounded by a policeman during a grocery store robbery. In August of that year, DeStefano appeared at a hospital on Chicago's West Side with bullet wounds, which he refused to explain.

In 1933, DeStefano was convicted of a bank robbery in New Lisbon, Wisconsin, and sentenced to 40 years in prison. His sentence was commuted by Governor Julius Heil in December 1942 and he was released in December 1944. DeStefano returned to prison in June 1947 for possessing counterfeit sugar ration stamps.

While in Leavenworth Federal Penitentiary in the 1940s DeStefano met Outfit members Paul Ricca and Louis Campagna. Later in 1947, DeStefano was released and obtained a civil service job in Chicago as a garbage dump foreman. In 1952, city officials discovered DeStefano had omitted his criminal record from his Civil Service application. However, they chose not to prosecute him.

== Crimes ==
=== Political fixing ===
During the early 1950s, DeStefano became one of the most prominent loan shark operators in Chicago. Using stolen money from his days as a bank robber, DeStefano began investing in Chicago real estate. He bought a 24-suite apartment building and used the rent money as legitimate income to bribe local aldermen and other politicians.

By the mid-1950s, DeStefano's influence extended to city officials, prominent judges, and law enforcement officers. DeStefano would brag "there wasn't any case he couldn't 'fix,'" and began offering his services accordingly. His fees ranged from $800 for fixing a robbery case to $1,500 for an assault case. DeStefano allegedly fixed a first-degree murder case for $20,000. DeStefano's arrangements became so routine, corrupt police officers would escort suspects to DeStefano's house. After DeStefano paid off the cops, the suspects would be "put on the juice" (i.e., indebted) to DeStefano in exchange for his assistance.

=== Loan sharking ===
By the early 1960s, DeStefano was a leading loan shark for the Outfit. DeStefano's loan shark victims included politicians, lawyers and small-time criminals; by the end of the decade, DeStefano was charging 20% to 25% a week in interest. DeStefano would accept very high-risk debtors, such as drug addicts or businessmen who had already defaulted on previous debts. The reason was simple: DeStefano enjoyed when debtors did not pay on time, since he could then bring them to the sound-proof torture chamber he had built in his basement. Other gangsters said the sadistic DeStefano would actually foam at the mouth while torturing his victims. From time to time, DeStefano would also kill debtors who owed him small sums just to scare other debtors into paying their bigger debts.

DeStefano would give his loan shark victims presents, such as a gold watch with his name engraved on the back, so that if he had to kill his victim and the police accused him he could use the watch as proof of how close he was to the victim and why he could never have killed him. He wore thick black rimmed glasses, making people believe he could not see without them, when in truth he could see everything that was going on and would take mental notes on how people operated.

Under normal circumstances, the Outfit would have distanced itself from DeStefano due to his sadistic, irrational behavior. However, the bosses tolerated DeStefano because he earned them a great deal of money. DeStefano was such a successful earner, Giancana and Tony Accardo invested some of their own money in DeStefano's loansharking operations.

Following a negative report in the Chicago Tribune by reporter William Doherty, DeStefano assaulted Doherty, chased him with a gun, threatened his family and finally broke the windows on Doherty's nearby parked car.

=== Acts of violence ===
In November 1963, DeStefano had a violent argument with Leo Foreman, a real estate agent and one of DeStefano's "juice-loan" collectors, in Foreman's office. DeStefano was physically ejected by Foreman from his office, and then he went into hiding. Later on, DeStefano underlings Tony Spilotro and Chuck Crimaldi contacted Foreman and said DeStefano wanted to let "bygones be bygones". Foreman was lured to the house of DeStefano's brother and was murdered soon after.

In another incident, Peter Cappelletti, a collector for DeStefano, fled Chicago with $25,000 from a loan shark victim. DeStefano's men located Cappelletti in Wisconsin and brought him back to Chicago. DeStefano chained Cappelletti to a radiator and tortured him for three days. While a banquet was going on, Cappelletti was secretly being tortured in the back of the restaurant. "Kill me, man, please, I'm on fire!" Cappelletti implored, to which DeStefano replied "Then we need to put the fire out" before having his men drag the severely burned Cappelletti into the dining area and forcing the man's family to urinate on him in unison. Following the banquet, the family quickly paid back the stolen money.

== Behavior ==
In 1962, DeStefano was arrested after he tried to represent Vito Zaccagonini in a forgery trial in Rockford, Illinois. He later demanded the names of all employees in the state's attorney's and sheriff's offices so that they could be called as witnesses at his subsequent trial.

FBI Agent William F. Roemer wrote of going to DeStefano's house to question him about mob business, saying that several times, DeStefano would walk down the stairs in his pajamas, exposing himself. Often, DeStefano's wife would serve the agents coffee and the agents would comment that the coffee had a unique taste to it. DeStefano would claim that the coffee was made from special Italian coffee beans that his wife brewed. Months later, Roemer found out DeStefano had been urinating in the coffee before serving it to the agents. Roemer wrote that he could never drink coffee again.

DeStefano's partner in the drug-dealing business was rogue and corrupt cop Tommy Dorso. Dorso said he once saw DeStefano roll on the floor with spit running from his mouth, begging Satan to show him mercy and screaming over and over again, "I'm your servant; command me."

Once, while riding in his car, DeStefano saw a man walking down a Chicago street. He forced the man into his car at gunpoint, took the man to his house and forced the man and his own wife to have sex with each other, all for some real or imagined grievance that DeStefano had with his wife. Afterward, the man was so mortified that he would be accused of rape, he went to the nearest police station and reported the incident.

One informant who was close to DeStefano described him as a highly emotional, temperamental individual, extremely egotistical and concerned with his personal appearance. The walls of his home were lined with mirrors and as DeStefano talked to people, he constantly watched his reflection in the mirrors as he walked across the room. He was described as being of such a temperament that he could be crying at one moment and laughing the very next. DeStefano would often state that if he had not been framed for rape at age 17, he would have become President of the United States.

== Later life and death ==
In 1965, DeStefano was convicted of conspiracy and sentenced to three to five years in prison. On February 22, 1972, DeStefano was sentenced to three and one-half years in prison for threatening the life of a witness, mobster-turned-informant Charles Crimaldi, an accomplice in the Foreman murder. DeStefano had encountered Crimaldi in the elevator of the Chicago Dirksen Federal Building and threatened him. Later in 1972, DeStefano was indicted on federal charges for illegal possession of firearms by a felon.

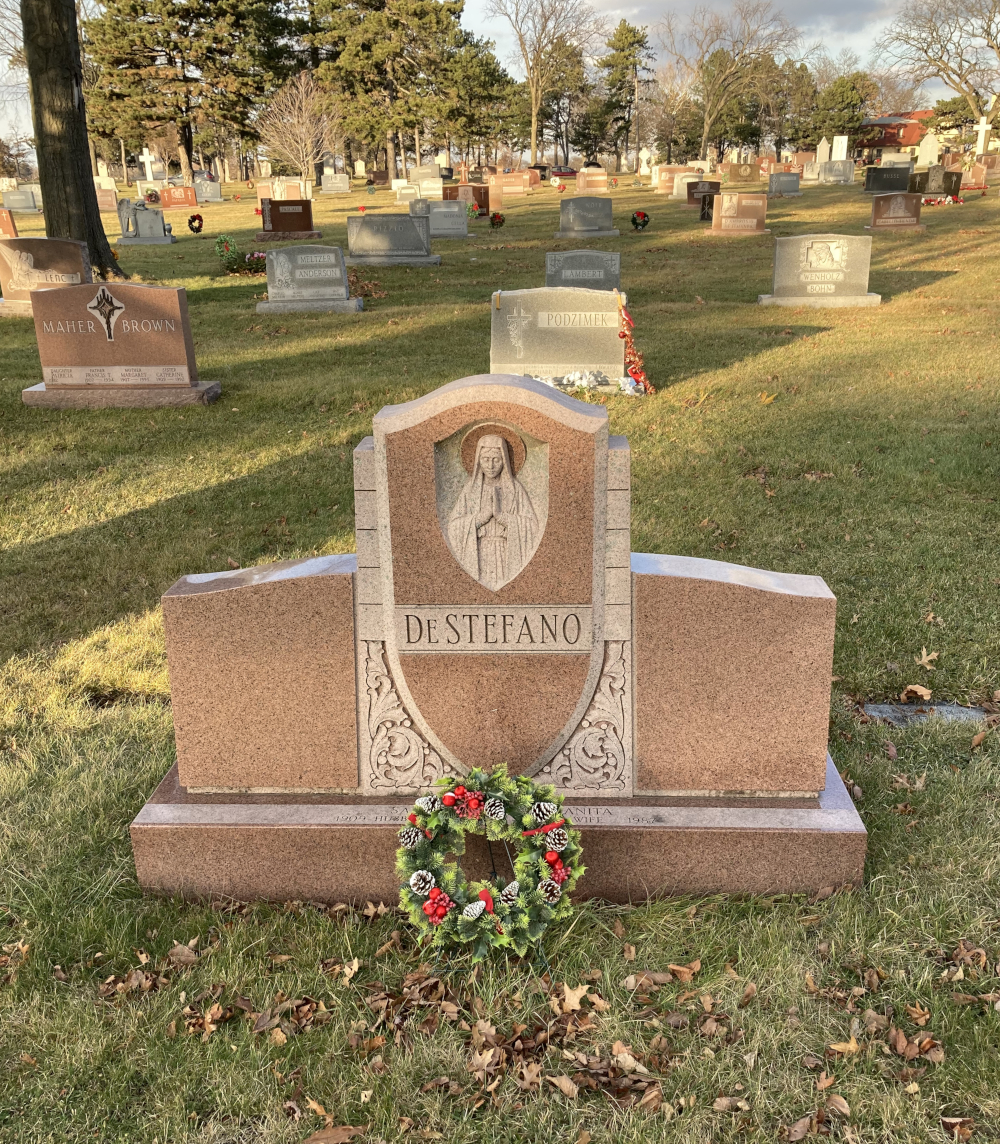
DeStefano's grave at Queen of Heaven Cemetery

DeStefano and his associates were eventually indicted for the Foreman murder. As in his previous trials, DeStefano had raised a large amount of public interest with his bizarre behavior. He made demands to represent himself, dressed in pajamas, shouted through bullhorns, and rambled incoherently. DeStefano then started displaying similar behavior in the Foreman trial. The Outfit bosses began to worry DeStefano was not only jeopardizing his own defense, but also the defenses of his other crew members. In a secret meeting, the then boss of the Chicago Outfit, Tony Accardo, gave DeStefano's crew permission to kill him.

On April 14, 1973, it was presumed that DeStefano was to have met with his brother, Mario Anthony DeStefano, and associate Tony Spilotro in the garage of his Galewood neighborhood home, in the 1600 block of North Sayre Avenue. Before the meeting began, Spilotro allegedly entered the lot and shot DeStefano twice with a shotgun, hitting him in the chest and tearing his left arm off at the elbow, instantly killing him. The murderer was never brought to trial.

DeStefano was buried at Queen of Heaven Cemetery in Hillside, Illinois.

== See also ==
- List of homicides in Illinois § Organized crime

== Bibliography ==
- Devito, Carlo. Encyclopedia of International Organized Crime. New York: Facts On File, Inc., 2005. ISBN 0-8160-4848-7
- Kelly, Robert J. Encyclopedia of Organized Crime in the United States. Westport, Connecticut: Greenwood Press, 2000. ISBN 0-313-30653-2
- Sifakis, Carl. The Mafia Encyclopedia. New York: Da Capo Press, 2005. ISBN 0-8160-5694-3
- Dark, Tony. A Mob of His Own: Samuel Mad Sam DeStefano and the Chicago Mob's Juice Rackets, H.H. Productions, Chicago, 2008. ISBN 978-0-615-17496-9
- McCluskie, Norma. "Decade of Fear", Lulu.com, LaVergne, Tennessee, 2010. ISBN 978-0-557-44970-5
