= Deaths in July 1987 =

The following is a list of notable deaths in July 1987.

Entries for each day are listed alphabetically by surname. A typical entry lists information in the following sequence:

- Name, age, country of citizenship at birth, subsequent country of citizenship (if applicable), reason for notability, cause of death (if known), and reference.

== July 1987 ==
=== 1 ===
- Mohamed Abou Habaga, 66, Egyptian Olympic footballer (1948).
- Kurt Lamm, 68, German-born American footballer, coach and manager, heart attack.
- Jerry Livingston, 78, American songwriter ("The Twelfth of Never") and dance orchestra pianist, heart condition.
- Edward Nesfield, 87, English cricketer.
- Bridget Sequeira, 81, Pakistani-Indian religious sister.
- Ted Sherman, 84, Australian rules footballer.
- Snakefinger, 38, English musician, singer and songwriter (The Residents), heart attack.
- Soetran, 66, Indonesian military officer and politician, Governor of Irian Jaya, liver cancer.

=== 2 ===
- Ćiril Ban, 76, Croatian Olympic rower (1936).
- Michael Bennett, 44, American theatre director, writer and dancer, lymphoma.
- Bruce Boehler, 69, American basketball player.
- Václav Černý, 82, Czech literary scholar, writer and philosopher.
- Lennart Dozzi, 77, Swedish Olympic canoeist (1936).
- Yacout El-Soury, Egyptian Olympic footballer (1928).
- Ellery Huntington Jr., 94, American college football player and coach (Colgate Raiders).
- Denis Larkin, 79, Irish politician (Teachta Dála, Lord Mayor of Dublin) and trade union official.
- Karl Linnas, 67, Estonian sentenced to death during the Holocaust trials, heart failure.
- Fred Mackey, 83, American college baseball and football player and coach.
- George B. Patton, 88, American jurist and politician, North Carolina Attorney General.
- Alick Stevens, 88, British RAF officer.
- George S. Wise, 81, American sociologist, president of Tel Aviv University, heart failure.

=== 3 ===
- Alfredo de Boer, 80, Brazilian Olympic rower (1936).
- Viola Dana, 90, American silent-screen actress (The Girl Without a Soul, Blue Jeans).
- John H. Mercer, 64, British glaciologist.
- William Wiard, 59, American film and television director, cancer.

=== 4 ===
- Edward Addison, 88, British Royal Air Force air vice marshal.
- Alexander Gordon-Lennox, 76, British Royal Navy rear admiral, president of the Royal Naval College, Greenwich.
- Abdul Halim, 75, Indonesian politician, Prime Minister of Indonesia.
- Sally Hamlin, 84, American child actor and pianist.
- Dan James, 49, American NFL footballer (Pittsburgh Steelers).
- Michel Paccard, 78, French Olympic ice hockey player (1936).
- Bengt Strömgren, 79, Danish astronomer and astrophysicist (Strömgren sphere), heart failure.

=== 5 ===
- Bobby Ancell, 76, Scottish international footballer and manager (St Mirren, Scotland).
- Karna Maria Birmingham, 86, Australian artist, illustrator and print maker
- Alan Gibson, 49, Canadian film and television director (Churchill and the Generals, A Woman Called Golda).
- Einar Sandberg, 81, Norwegian footballer.

=== 6 ===
- Halvard Grude Forfang, 72, Norwegian educator.
- László Pusztai, 41, Hungarian international footballer (Ferencvárosi, Hungary), car accident.
- Elli Stenberg, 84, Finnish politician.

=== 7 ===
- Stan Brown, 89, Canadian ice hockey player (New York Rangers, Detroit Cougars).
- Giannino Bulzone, 76, Italian Olympic long-distance runner (1936).
- Finis Jennings Dake, 84, American Pentecostal minister, Parkinson's disease.
- Dino, 70, Brazilian footballer.
- William Dodge, 62, American Olympic bobsledder (1956).
- Michael J. Eagen, 80. American chief justice of the Supreme Court of Pennsylvania.
- René Gérard, 73, French international footballer (Montpellier, France).
- H. R. Jothipala, 51, Sri Lankan playback singer, liver failure.
- Ernest Achey Loftus, 103, British soldier and diarist.
- John Meredith Rockingham, 75, Australian-born Canadian Army general.
- Hannelore Schroth, 65, German actress.
- John Singer, 63, English actor (Sweeney Todd: The Demon Barber of Fleet Street).
- Ralph Stevenson, 70, American NFL player (Cleveland Rams).
- Howard Teichmann, 71, American Broadway playwright.
- Anthony Robert Temple, 60, Canadian lawyer and politician, member of the Canada House of Commons (1963–1965).
- Germaine Thyssens-Valentin, 84, Dutch-born French classical pianist.

=== 8 ===
- Boris Brechko, 76, Soviet Olympic rower (1952).
- George Burrows, 76, Canadian Olympic swimmer (1932).
- Lionel Chevrier, 84, Canadian politician, member of the House of Commons of Canada (1935–1954, 1957–1963).
- Gerardo Diego, 90, Spanish poet, Generation of '27 member.
- Francis J. Gorman, 62, American politician, member of the New Jersey General Assembly (1972–1987).
- Alvin O'Konski, 83, American politician, member of the U.S. House of Representatives (1943–1973), cardiac arrest.
- Fuen Ronnaphagrad Ritthakhanee, 87, Thai aviator, Royal Thai Air Force officer, Deputy Prime Minister of Thailand.
- Franjo Wölfl, 69, Croatian international footballer (Građanski Zagreb, Yugoslavia).

=== 9 ===
- Eduardo Fiestas, 62, Peruvian Olympic basketball player (1948).
- Michiyo Fukaya, 34, American feminist poet and activist, suicide.
- Nevil Hall, 71, South African Olympic wrestler (1936).
- Alex Kaleta, 67, Canadian NHL player (Chicago Blackhawks, New York Rangers).
- Ashley Kriel, 20, South African anti-apartheid activist, killed by police.
- Waris Mir, 48, Pakistani journalist and academic, cardiac arrest.
- Hezekiah Ochuka, 33, Kenyan private in the Kenyan Air Force, Kenyan leader for 6 hours, hanged.
- Paul Rapoport, 47, American lawyer, AIDS.
- Ulas Samchuk, 82, Ukrainian writer, journalist and anti-semite.
- Raymond Stasse, 74, Belgian Olympic fencer (1936, 1948).
- William McKenzie Thomson, 88, Canadian WWI flying ace.
- Ernest Ward, 66, English rugby league footballer (Bradford Northern, Great Britain).

=== 10 ===
- Inge Beeken, 66, Danish Olympic diver (1948).
- Doug Dobell, 69, British record store proprietor and record producer (77 Records), heart attack.
- John Hammond, 76, American record producer, civil rights activist and music critic, stroke.
- Gus Healy, 83, Irish Fianna Fáil politician.
- Harold Rice, 75, American educator and magician.
- Tanya Zolotoroff Nash, 89, Russian-born American Deaf Rights activist.
- Ferenc Rákosi, 76, Hungarian Olympic handball player (1936).
- Marcel Vanco, 92, French footballer.

=== 11 ===
- Joe Bennett, 87, American MLB player (Philadelphia Phillies).
- Hannah Billig, 85, British medical doctor.
- Marion Brooks, 91, American silent-screen actress, entertainment journalist and screenwriter.
- Geoffrey Chance, 93, English cricketer.
- Freddie Crum, 74, American basketball player.
- Dorothy Davies, 87, New Zealand pianist and piano teacher.
- Van Davis, 65, American football player.
- Ville Mattila, 84, Finnish Olympic cross-country skier (1924, 1928).
- Cyril McLaglen, 87, British and American film actor.
- Truman J. Nelson, 75–76, American novelist and essayist, civil rights activist, heart failure.
- Fernando Garcia Ponce, 53, Mexican architect and artist, heart attack.
- Avi Ran, 23, Israeli international footballer (Maccabi Haifa, Israel), hit by racing boat.
- Yaakov Yitzchok Ruderman, 87, Russian-born American Talmudic scholar and rabbi.
- Robert Love Taylor, 87, American district judge.
- Tom Waddell, 49, American physician, decathlete Olympian and founder of the Gay Olympics, AIDS.
- Jack Williams, 79, Australian rules footballer.

=== 12 ===
- Joseph Burns, 98, American MLB player (Cincinnati Reds, Detroit Tigers).
- John Fitzgerald, 86, Australian rules footballer.
- Peter Gimbel, 60, American filmmaker and underwater photojournalist, cancer.
- Harold Goodwin, 84, American actor.
- Sir Archibald Hope, 17th Baronet, 75, Scottish aristocrat and aviator.
- Emilio el Moro, 63, Spanish Flamenco singer, guitarist and humorist.
- Nathan Perlmutter, 63–64, American executive director of the Anti-Defamation League, lung cancer.
- Marguerite Renoir, 80, French film editor.
- Hélio da Silva, 63, Brazilian Olympic athlete (1948).
- Andrei Snezhnevsky, 83, Soviet psychiatrist, lung cancer.
- Pat Wellington, 33, Australian rules footballer.

=== 13 ===
- Elemér von Barcza, 82, Hungarian Olympic equestrian (1936).
- Patience Collier, 76, British actress.
- Robert Francis, 85, American poet.
- Silas Jayne, 80, American horse trainer and murderer, leukemia.
- Khandadash Madatov, 62, Soviet Azerbaijani Olympic athlete (1952).
- Eric Worrell, 62, Australian naturalist and science writer, established Australian Reptile Park, heart attack.

=== 14 ===
- Salvador E. Felices, 63, Puerto Rican general in the U.S. Air Force.
- Bernard de Fombelle, 63, French Olympic equestrian (1956, 1960).
- Vern Hickey, 86, American collegiate coach and administrator.
- Fritz Holt, 46, American theatre producer and director (La Cage aux Folles), pneumonia.
- William Overton, 47, United States district judge, cancer.
- Sao Saimong, 73, Burmese government minister.
- William Stuart-Houston, 76, English-born American half-nephew of Adolf Hitler.
- Pak Yung-sun, 30, North Korean table tennis player, world champion.
- Viktor Zhdanov, 73, Soviet virologist and epidemiologist, instrumental in eradicating smallpox, cerebral hemorrhage.

=== 15 ===
- Lee Ballanfant, 91, American Major League baseball umpire.
- J. Rives Childs, 94, American diplomat, U.S. ambassador to Saudi Arabia, North Yemen and Ethiopia, pulmonary infection.
- Polly Elwes, 59, British BBC television in-vision announcer and reporter (Tonight), bone cancer.
- Lee Gaines, 73, American jazz singer and lyricist ("Take the A Train", "Just A-Sittin' and A-Rockin'"), cancer.
- Fernando Van Zeller Guedes, 84, Portuguese wine producer (Sogrape).
- Pete King, 28, British musician, testicular cancer.
- Mick McKeon, 63–64, Irish Olympic boxer (1948).
- Jack O'Hagan, 88, Australian singer, songwriter and radio personality ("Along the Road to Gundagai", "Our Don Bradman").
- Bill Ricks, 67, American baseball player.
- Margarete Schlegel, 87, German and British theatre and film actress and soprano operetta singer (Berlin-Alexanderplatz).

=== 16 ===
- Harry Ayres, 74, New Zealand mountaineer and guide, suspected suicide.
- Alfie Bass, 71, English actor, heart attack.
- Roald A. Hogenson, 74, American judge.
- Henry Kroger, 81, Australian cricketer.
- Pierre Lardinois, 62, Dutch politician and diplomat, member of the House of Representatives, cancer.
- Juraj Lupták, 45, Slovak rapist and serial killer, hanged.
- Rube Novotney, 62, American MLB player (Chicago Cubs).
- Rudolph Palumbo, 86, British property developer.
- Arthur Pilbrow, 85, British Olympic fencer (1936, 1948).
- Tony Tani, 69, Japanese entertainer, liver cancer.
- Cliff Wilton, 71, Scottish rugby union player, President of the Scottish Rugby Union.

=== 17 ===
- Marjorie Cottle, 86, English motorcycle trials rider.
- Dominick V. Daniels, 78, American politician, member of the U.S. House of Representatives (1959–1977).
- Robert Desjarlais, 79, Canadian Olympic fencer (1948).
- Roy Evans, 76, Australian rules footballer.
- Jörg Fauser, 43, German writer, poet and journalist, hit by truck.
- Yūjirō Ishihara, 52, Japanese actor and singer, liver cancer.
- James Lytle, 86, American collegiate coach.
- Howard McGhee, 69, American bebop jazz trumpeter.
- Mathura Prasad Mishra, 69, Indian politician, member of Lok Sabha.
- Kristjan Palusalu, 79, Estonian heavyweight wrestler and dual Olympic gold medalist.
- Leon B. Poullada, 74, American diplomat, U.S. Ambassador to Togo, prostate cancer.

=== 18 ===
- Anthony Casamento, 66, American marine corporal, Medal of Honor recipient.
- George Dahl, 93, American architect, dehydration.
- Harry B. Davis, 93, American politician, member of the Virginia House of Delegates (1934–1959).
- Gilberto Freyre, 87, Brazilian sociologist, writer and congressman, brain hemorrhage.
- Alfredo Ruano, 54, El Salvadoran international footballer (Alianza, El Salvador), heart attack.

=== 19 ===
- Clementina de Jesus, 86, Brazilian samba singer, stroke.
- Jane Kendeigh, 65, American flight nurse of the U.S. Navy.
- Bob Smith, 92, American MLB player.
- Aadhavan Sundaram, 45, Indian Tamil writer, drowned.
- Brij Lal Varma, 70–71, Indian politician, member of Lok Sabha, cabinet minister.

=== 20 ===
- Ichirō Arishima, 71, Japanese comedian and actor (King Kong vs. Godzilla).
- Norbert Casteret, 89, French caver, adventurer and writer.
- Richard Egan, 65, American actor (The Glory Brigade, The Kid from Left Field), prostate cancer.
- Margit Johnsen, 74, Norwegian sailor in the merchant navy.
- Dmitry Lelyushenko, 85, Soviet army general, Hero of the Soviet Union.
- Denis J. O'Sullivan, 69, Irish politician.
- Jim Ray, 53, American NBA player (Syracuse Nationals).
- Börje Strandvall, 78, Finnish Olympic sprinter (1932, 1936).
- Tom Winsett, 77, American MLB player (Boston Red Sox, St. Louis Cardinals, Brooklyn Dodgers).
- Alexander Wood, 80, Scottish American international footballer (Leicester City, United States).

=== 21 ===
- John Armstrong, 71, Irish Anglican bishop, Archbishop of Armagh.
- Curt Bergsten, 75, Swedish footballer.
- Donald Cressey, 68, American penologist, sociologist and criminologist, heart attack.
- Louis DaPron, 74, American dancer, choreographer and dance instructor, heart attack.
- Luigi Gilardi, 89, Italian Olympic cyclist (1920).
- Bert Keyes, 56, American pianist, songwriter and singer ("Love on a Two-Way Street").
- Stella Steyn, 79, Irish artist.
- Burke Trend, 73, British civil servant, rector of Lincoln College.
- Hughie Wise, 81, American MLB player (Detroit Tigers).
- Massabalala Yengwa, South African lawyer, anti-apartheid activist

=== 22 ===
- Adele Comandini, 89, American screenwriter (Three Smart Girls).
- Fahrettin Kerim Gökay, 87, Turkish politician and diplomat, ambassador to Switzerland.
- Eugene Halliday, 75, British artist and writer.
- Natalie Hinderas, 60, American pianist and composer, cancer.
- Mary Cover Jones, 89, American developmental psychologist, pioneer of behaviour therapy.
- Jack Lescoulie, 74, American radio and television announcer and host (Today), colon cancer.
- C. B. Macpherson, 75, Canadian political scientist.
- Don McMahon, 57, American Major League baseball player (Milwaukee Braves, San Francisco Giants), heart attack.
- Nick Perls, 55, American audio engineer, founder and owner of Yazoo Records and Blue Goose Records.
- Raja Shankar, 55, Indian actor.
- A. G. Kripal Singh, 53, Indian Test cricketer and national selector, cardiac arrest.
- Henry Tayali, 43, Zambian painter, sculptor and printmaker.

=== 23 ===
- James Bizzle, 67, American baseball player.
- DeVeren Bookwalter, 47, American actor and director (Cyrano de Bergerac), stomach cancer.
- Song Deok-gi, 94, Korean martial artist.
- Stuart Hay, 77, New Zealand sportsman.
- Art Jarrett, 80, American singer, actor and bandleader, pneumonia.
- Alex Sadkin, 38, American record producer and engineer, motor accident.
- Manuel Suárez y Suárez, 91, Spanish-born Mexican entrepreneur and patron of the arts (Casino de la Selva, Hotel de México).

=== 24 ===
- Anna-Eva Bergman, 78, Norwegian abstract expressionist artist.
- Franz Burri, 85, Swiss political figure, disseminator of Nazi propaganda.
- Pat Clancy, 68, Australian trade unionist, heart attack.
- Dick Wellstood, 59, American jazz pianist, heart attack.

=== 25 ===
- Malcolm Baldrige Jr., 64, American businessman, U.S. Secretary of Commerce (1981–1987), rodeo accident.
- Charles Stark Draper, 85, American scientist and engineer, "father of inertial navigation".
- Werner Hamel, 76, German Olympic field hockey player (1936).
- Lydie Marland, 87, American first lady of Oklahoma.
- Tracy Read, 25, American race car driver, race crash.
- Tom Wade, 76, English cricketer.
- Mastin G. White, 86, American judge.

=== 26 ===
- Hamza Abdel Mawla, 63, Egyptian Olympic footballer (1952).
- Jim Bishop, 79, American journalist and author (The Day Lincoln Was Shot), respiratory failure.
- Chinmoy Chattopadhyay, 56, Indian singer.
- Phyllis Cilento, 93, Australian medical practitioner, advocate of family planning and promoter of racist beliefs.
- Frank Marshall Davis, 81, American journalist, poet and political activist, heart attack.
- Tawfiq al-Hakim, 88, Egyptian writer.
- Joe Liggins, 71, American R&B, jazz and blues pianist and vocalist, stroke.
- Carmelita Maracci, 79, American concert dancer and choreographer, heart attack.
- Kenneth Muse, 77, American animator (Tom and Jerry).
- George O'Day, 64, American Olympic sailor (1960).
- Mario Radice, 88, Italian painter
- Hugh Wheeler, 75, British-born American novelist, screenwriter and poet (Sweeney Todd).

=== 27 ===
- Fernando Brandolini, 55, Italian road cyclist.
- Feodor Fedorenko, 79, Soviet Nazi collaborator and war criminal, executed.
- Harold A. Furlong, 91, American army officer, Medal of Honor recipient.
- Travis Jackson, 83, American Major League baseball player (New York Giants), Alzheimer's disease.
- Jan Mikusiński, 74, Polish mathematician (mathematical analysis).
- K. L. N. Prasad, 59, Indian politician, Rajya Sabha member.

=== 28 ===
- James Burnham, 81, American philosopher and political theorist, kidney and liver cancer.
- Carlton Fredericks, 76, American radio commentator and writer on health and nutrition, heart attack.
- George Gulack, 82, American Olympic gymnast (1932).
- Jack Renshaw, 77, Australian politician, Premier of New South Wales.
- Ismet Alajbegović Šerbo, 62, Bosnian accordionist, composer and writer of folk songs.
- Nguyễn Tuân, 77, Vietnamese author.
- Philip E. Vernon, 82, British-born Canadian psychologist and author.
- Levie Vorst, 83, Dutch rabbi of Rotterdam.

=== 29 ===
- Désiré Acket, 82, Belgian painter.
- Arthur J. Bressan Jr., 44, American director, writer and documentarian (Buddies), AIDS.
- Arthur Chipperfield, 81, Australian test cricketer.
- Aleksey Sukletin, 44, Soviet serial killer, rapist and cannibal, executed.

=== 30 ===
- Andrei Bărbulescu, 77, Romanian footballer and ice hockey player.
- Vicky Clement-Jones, 38, Hong Kong–born English physician and medical researcher, ovarian cancer.
- Lado Davidov, 62, Soviet soldier during the Second World War and Hero of the Soviet Union.
- Hec Fowler, 94, Canadian ice hockey player.
- McDonald Hobley, 70, British BBC Television continuity announcer, heart attack.
- Bernard Sta Maria, 42–43, Malaysian politician and author, member of Malacca State Legislative Assembly, bronchitis.
- Bráz Magaldi, 90, Brazilian Olympic sports shooter (1932).
- Bibhutibhushan Mukhopadhyay, 92, Indian Bengali language author.
- John Sheffield, 77, British army officer and Olympic hurdler (1936).
- Narciso Soldan, 59, Italian footballer (AC Milan, Torino FC).
- Michel Tapié, 78, French art critic, curator, and collector.

=== 31 ===
- Kenneth Carllile, 56, American country music guitarist and songwriter, heart attack.
- Joseph E. Levine, 81, American film distributor, financier and producer (Godzilla, King of the Monsters!).
- Aleksandar Petrović, 72, Serbian football player, manager, and Olympian (1948).
- Justine W. Polier, 84, American lawyer, first woman Justice in New York.
- Reuben Reid, 84, Australian rules footballer.
- Michael Staniforth, 44, British actor (Rentaghost), AIDS.
- Paul Yakabuski, 64, Canadian politician, member of the Legislative Assembly of Ontario, head injuries from fall.

=== Unknown date ===
- Sari Maritza, 77, Chinese-born British film actress.
- Joe Mondragon, 67, American jazz bassist.
- Hugh Perceval, 79, British screenwriter and film producer.
