= Vasilyevo =

Vasilyevo (Russian: Васильево) is the name of several inhabited localities in Russia.

== Arkhangelsk Oblast ==
As of 2010, one rural locality in Arkhangelsk Oblast bears this name:

- Vasilyevo, Arkhangelsk Oblast, a village in Ukhotsky Selsoviet of Kargopolsky District

== Republic of Bashkortostan ==
As of 2010, one rural locality in the Republic of Bashkortostan bears this name:

- Vasilyevo, Republic of Bashkortostan, a village in Tyuldinsky Selsoviet of Kaltasinsky District

== Republic of Karelia ==
As of 2010, one rural locality in the Republic of Karelia bears this name:

- Vasilyevo, Republic of Karelia, a village in Medvezhyegorsky District

== Kirov Oblast ==
As of 2010, one rural locality in Kirov Oblast bears this name:

- Vasilyevo, Kirov Oblast, a village in Bezvodninsky Rural Okrug of Pizhansky District

== Kostroma Oblast ==
As of 2010, one rural locality in Kostroma Oblast bears this name:

- Vasilyevo, Kostroma Oblast, a village in Vasilyevskoye Settlement of Soligalichsky District

== Leningrad Oblast ==
As of 2010, two rural localities in Leningrad Oblast bear this name:

- Vasilyevo, Krasnoozernoye Settlement Municipal Formation, Priozersky District, Leningrad Oblast, a village in Krasnoozernoye Settlement Municipal Formation of Priozersky District
- Vasilyevo, Melnikovskoye Settlement Municipal Formation, Priozersky District, Leningrad Oblast, a logging depot settlement in Melnikovskoye Settlement Municipal Formation of Priozersky District

== Moscow Oblast ==
As of 2010, three rural localities in Moscow Oblast bear this name:

- Vasilyevo, Kolomensky District, Moscow Oblast, a selo in Akatyevskoye Rural Settlement of Kolomensky District
- Vasilyevo, Naro-Fominsky District, Moscow Oblast, a village in Volchenkovskoye Rural Settlement of Naro-Fominsky District
- Vasilyevo, Ramensky District, Moscow Oblast, a village in Sofyinskoye Rural Settlement of Ramensky District

== Nizhny Novgorod Oblast ==
As of 2010, two rural localities in Nizhny Novgorod Oblast bear this name:

- Vasilyevo, Semyonov, Nizhny Novgorod Oblast, a village in Malozinovyevsky Selsoviet of the city of oblast significance of Semyonov
- Vasilyevo, Koverninsky District, Nizhny Novgorod Oblast, a village in Khokhlomsky Selsoviet of Koverninsky District

== Novgorod Oblast ==
As of 2010, one rural locality in Novgorod Oblast bears this name:

- Vasilyevo, Novgorod Oblast, a village in Kirovskoye Settlement of Moshenskoy District

== Pskov Oblast ==
As of 2010, one rural locality in Pskov Oblast bears this name:

- Vasilyevo, Pskov Oblast, a village in Palkinsky District

== Ryazan Oblast ==
As of 2010, one rural locality in Ryazan Oblast bears this name:

- Vasilyevo, Ryazan Oblast, a village in Belovsky Rural Okrug of Klepikovsky District

== Smolensk Oblast ==
As of 2010, four rural localities in Smolensk Oblast bear this name:

- Vasilyevo, Kardymovsky District, Smolensk Oblast, a village in Tyushinskoye Rural Settlement of Kardymovsky District
- Vasilyevo, Monastyrshchinsky District, Smolensk Oblast, a village in Sobolevskoye Rural Settlement of Monastyrshchinsky District
- Vasilyevo, Knyazhinskoye Rural Settlement, Pochinkovsky District, Smolensk Oblast, a village in Knyazhinskoye Rural Settlement of Pochinkovsky District
- Vasilyevo, Muryginskoye Rural Settlement, Pochinkovsky District, Smolensk Oblast, a village in Muryginskoye Rural Settlement of Pochinkovsky District

== Tambov Oblast ==
As of 2010, one rural locality in Tambov Oblast bears this name:

- Vasilyevo, Tambov Oblast, a village in Pokrovo-Vasilyevsky Selsoviet of Pichayevsky District

== Republic of Tatarstan ==
As of 2010, two inhabited localities in the Republic of Tatarstan bear this name.

Urban localities

- Vasilyevo, Zelenodolsky District, Republic of Tatarstan, an urban-type settlement in Zelenodolsky District

Rural localities

- Vasilyevo, Mamadyshsky District, Republic of Tatarstan, a selo in Mamadyshsky District

== Tver Oblast ==
As of 2010, five rural localities in Tver Oblast bear this name:

- Vasilyevo, Bologovsky District, Tver Oblast, a village in Kaftinskoye Rural Settlement of Bologovsky District
- Vasilyevo, Kashinsky District, Tver Oblast, a village in Farafonovskoye Rural Settlement of Kashinsky District
- Vasilyevo, Torzhoksky District, Tver Oblast, a village in Bogatkovskoye Rural Settlement of Torzhoksky District
- Vasilyevo, Udomelsky District, Tver Oblast, a village in Porozhkinskoye Rural Settlement of Udomelsky District
- Vasilyevo, Vyshnevolotsky District, Tver Oblast, a village in Kholokholenskoye Rural Settlement of Vyshnevolotsky District

== Udmurt Republic ==
As of 2010, two rural localities in the Udmurt Republic bear this name:

- Vasilyevo, Glazovsky District, Udmurt Republic, a village in Urakovsky Selsoviet of Glazovsky District
- Vasilyevo, Kiznersky District, Udmurt Republic, a selo in Vasilyevsky Selsoviet of Kiznersky District

== Vladimir Oblast ==
As of 2010, one rural locality in Vladimir Oblast bears this name:

- Vasilyevo, Vladimir Oblast, a village in Sudogodsky District

== Vologda Oblast ==
As of 2010, seven rural localities in Vologda Oblast bear this name:

- Vasilyevo, Babushkinsky District, Vologda Oblast, a village in Bereznikovsky Selsoviet of Babushkinsky District
- Vasilyevo, Kirillovsky District, Vologda Oblast, a village in Migachevsky Selsoviet of Kirillovsky District
- Vasilyevo, Igmassky Selsoviet, Nyuksensky District, Vologda Oblast, a settlement in Igmassky Selsoviet of Nyuksensky District
- Vasilyevo, Kosmarevsky Selsoviet, Nyuksensky District, Vologda Oblast, a village in Kosmarevsky Selsoviet of Nyuksensky District
- Vasilyevo, Sheksninsky District, Vologda Oblast, a village in Churovsky Selsoviet of Sheksninsky District
- Vasilyevo, Vashkinsky District, Vologda Oblast, a village in Kisnemsky Selsoviet of Vashkinsky District
- Vasilyevo, Velikoustyugsky District, Vologda Oblast, a village in Teplogorsky Selsoviet of Velikoustyugsky District

== Yaroslavl Oblast ==
As of 2010, two rural localities in Yaroslavl Oblast bear this name:

- Vasilyevo, Uglichsky District, Yaroslavl Oblast, a village in Vozdvizhensky Rural Okrug of Uglichsky District
- Vasilyevo, Yaroslavsky District, Yaroslavl Oblast, a village in Lyutovsky Rural Okrug of Yaroslavsky District

== See also ==
- Vasily (disambiguation)
- Vasilyev
- Vasilyevsky (disambiguation)
