= Aleksey Sukletin =

Soviet serial killer, rapist and cannibal

Aleksey Sukletin Алексей Суклетин
- Born: Aleksey Vasilevich Sukletin; March 23, 1943; Kazan, Tatar ASSR, Russian SFSR, Soviet Union
- Died: 29 July 1987 (aged 44); Kazan, Tatar ASSR, Russian SFSR, Soviet Union
- Cause of death: Execution by shooting
- Other names: "The Alligator", "The Vassilyevo Cannibal", "The Kazan Ogre", "The Volga Alligator"
- Status: Executed
- Convictions: Murder with aggravating circumstances Cannibalism
- Penalty: Death

Details
- Victims: 7
- Span of crimes: 1979–1985
- Country: Soviet Union
- State: Tatar ASSR
- Date apprehended: 4 June 1985

Aleksey Vasilyevich Sukletin (Russian: Алексе́й Васи́льевич Сукле́тин; 23 March 1943 – 29 July 1987) was a Soviet serial killer, rapist and cannibal. Between 1979 and 1985 (according to other data, from 1981 to 1985), along with accomplices Madina Shakirova and Anatoly Nikitin, he killed and cannibalized seven girls and women in Tatarstan.

== Biography ==
=== Early life and early crimes ===
Aleksey Vasilevich Sukletin was born in 1943, in Kazan, RSFSR, Soviet Union. His mother worked as a nurse in a military field hospital (it is known that she was alive in 1985 when Sukletin was arrested on suspicion of a series of murders). There is no available information about his father. Sukletin suffered from alcoholism, drinking heavily until he reached adulthood.

The first crime he committed was in February 1960, at the age of 16. At night, he attacked a girl, hitting her with a heavy object on the head and attempted to rape her. She was saved by two young men, and the offender was asked to leave, but as a result, he got arrested. Sukletin was sentenced to two years imprisonment, serving his punishment in a youth detention centre, and upon reaching maturity he was transferred to a corrective labour colony.

In 1964, Sukletin committed a new crime, acting together with accomplices with whom he drank alcohol. Once they had no more money left, Sukletin informed them of an elderly woman who lived nearby. They entered her apartment together, posing as gas service employees. The men then hit the woman on the head with a heavy object and took 80 rubles, but the victim survived and reported the crime to the police. The attackers were detained a few hours later at the nearest bar.

Aleksey Sukletin was sentenced to 12 years imprisonment. While serving his sentence, he collaborated with law enforcement agencies, telling them about each of his convictions. He read many books in the colony, and later used his erudition to seduce women.

=== Acquaintance with Madina Shakirova ===
In 1976, Sukletin was released. He got a job as a worker for an insurance company, but never went to work, and then as a guard for a horticultural association, from where he was fired for frequent absences. In 1978, he became a medical orderly in a psychiatric hospital. A year later, he changed jobs, becoming a guard again, this time in the garden community "Kaenlyk" in the urban settlement of Vasilyevo.

The same year, Aleksey Sukletin met 23-year-old Madina Nurgazizovnaya Shakirova, a native of Vasilyevo, and began cohabiting with her. He told her that he allegedly was serving a sentence at a Kazakh camp, but fled. Before meeting Sukletin, Shakirova had gone to Uzbekistan for work, then moved to Kazan, where she worked as a turner at a plant, then as a breeder on a farm. She also had a child which she abandoned and gave to her parents, while she herself moved in with Sukletin.

Soon the couple began to engage in criminal activities, starting with extortion. By order of Sukletin, Shakirova went from Vasilyevo to Kazan, taking a taxi back late in the evening. She complained to the taxi driver that her husband was cheating on her, and when they came to Sukletin's home, she offered the taxi driver to spend the night together. The man agreed, and then Sukletin and his accomplice Rinat Volkov, who played the role of a jealous husband and Shakirova's brother, burst into the bedroom. They beat the taxi driver and demanded money from him, also photographing him in indecent postures, asking for 200 rubles or else they would distribute the pictures to the public. The next day, the taxi driver gave them 200 rubles.

== Murders ==
Shortly after meeting Shakirova, Sukletin informed her of his desire to kill women for cannibalism. He told her about his first idol, Jean-Bédel Bokassa, emperor of the Central African Empire, the other being 19th century British serial killer Jack the Ripper.

Sukletin committed his first murder in November 1979 (according to some sources, it was in November 1981). He invited 22-year-old Ekaterina Osetrova (allegedly a sex worker) to his home, introducing Shakirova as his sister. A feast took place, and at night Sukletin and Osetrova went to the bedroom and had sex. Shakirova then offered Osetrova a drink - distracting her - while Sukletin took a rag-wrapped hammer and hit her on the head with it. Sukletin then put her in a trough, tied her hands with a rope, and cut her throat. He claimed to have drunk her blood while she was still alive, and made Shakirova drink with him. When Osetrova died, he hung her corpse and mocked her, before cutting off the soft tissues and eviscerating the internal organs (with Shakirova's help). The remaining blood was disposed of in the bath. Sukletin then ate her heart, liver and lungs. Shakirova then prepared borscht and pelmeni from the remains, which she ate together with Sukletin. with some of the remaining meat being fed to their dogs. The couple buried the victim's bones under a water tower (according to others, in a barrel).

Sukletin killed all his subsequent victims in a similar way. He stunned them with a strong blow from the hammer or hit their head against the wall, then in most cases cut the throat (in one case, it was the hammer blow that was fatal). After the death of the victim, Sukletin and Shakirova dismembered the corpse and ate the soft tissues. Shakirova would then wash the bloody clothes and Sukletin's underwear. She did not take part in the killings directly. The bones of all subsequent victims were buried in the same place as those of Osetrova. Sometimes, Shakirova would keep items from the victims. In addition to eating the human meat, Sukletin and Shakirova sold it to their neighbours under the guise of being tenderloin. According to the head of the investigative unit of the Tatarstan Prosecutor's Office (later, deputy prosecutor of Tatarstan) Farid Zagidullin, Sukletin's adult victims were sex-workers, vagrants, or alcoholics.

Subsequently, Madina Shakirova recalled that Sukletin looked at women only as possible sources of meat. Allegedly, Sukletin had tried to kill her three times. She also said:

Beautiful women caused him to be really malicious. Well, those intelligent, he was afraid of. He liked to talk and dream about such people as me, how he would have sexual intercourse with her, and always in a perverted form, and then he would kill and eat them.

In January 1980 (according to other sources, January 1982), Sukletin committed his second murder. Together with Shakirova, he met two girls and invited them to celebrate the New Year. At night, he killed and ate one of the girls, 22-year-old Tatiana Illarionova. He did not harm the second girl, as she seemed too thin for his liking. When the surviving girl woke up, Sukletin told her that Ilarionova got up early in the morning and went to Kazan.

The third victim of the killer was 15 to 16-year-old Rezeda Galimova. Sukletin lured the girl to his dacha, saying that he would settle her problems with studies. He raped her, and then killed her with two hammer blows to the head. The victim begged Shakirova to help her, but she refused. Subsequently, Shakirova took the murdered girl's sweater.

After killing Galimova, Sukletin lured 22-year-old Nadezhda Sityavina to his house. He killed her after announcing to Shakirova that he would cohabit with Sityavina and presenting Nadezhda to his mother in Zelenodolsk.

The fifth victim was 19-year-old Natalia Shkolnikova, a colleague of Sityavina.

The sixth and youngest victim of Sukletin was 11-year-old (or 12) Valentina Elikova. Having met the girl in Kazan, the killer introduced himself as a distant uncle and took her to his home. There he hit Elikova's head against the wall, raped, killed and then ate her. Shakirova tried to save the child, but Sukletin severely beat her. After the murder, he ordered Shakirova to kidnap a baby for him, but she refused. She eventually left Sukletin and returned to her parents but did not tell anybody about the crimes. After Shakirova fled, Sukletin raped the juvenile daughter of his friend Boris. He achieved this by telling her about a non-existent nephew living in Italy, for whom he promised to find a girl to marry.

Soon after, 23-year-old excessive drinker Lydiya Fyodorova became Sukletin's new cohabitant. She was accompanied by her relative Anatoly Nikitin. The three of them had parties and drank alcohol. However, the new concubine refused to help Sukletin kill and eat women, threatening to expose him to the police. On 12 March 1985, Sukletin and Nikitin raped and beat Fyodorova, who became the seventh and last victim. Sukletin burned her clothes and, after mocking the corpse, dismembered it, and ate the soft tissues. On 18 March, Shakirova returned to Sukletin. In order to conceal the murder, she cleaned her roommate's room and washed the bloodied clothes.

According to neighbours, Aleksey Sukletin did not arouse any suspicion in them. They knew him as a good man and drinking companion, who could fix the roof, dig potatoes, recite poems, and was a hospitable host. He liked women and enjoyed their company. He liked to call passing children "meatballs", but no one could have imagined that the guard committed murders and engaged in cannibalism. The Vasilyevo police eventually visited Sukletin, but failed to gather any evidence. In mid-80s Soviet society, it was not customary to talk about serial killers, which were considered a characteristic feature of capitalist countries, as a result of which law enforcement agencies kept the disappearances of women and girls in Vasilyevo a secret.

== Arrest ==
Fyodorova's long absence became of interest to law enforcement. Representatives visited Sukletin and asked him questions about her whereabouts, but he replied that he had no clue on the subject. Shortly after Fyodorova's murder, Sukletin visited Gennady Uglov, a co-worker with whom he drank alcohol. When Uglov asked Sukletin where Fyodorova was, the maniac showed him the burial site of her remains. Sukletin believed that Uglov would not disclose what he knew about Fyodorova's murder because Sukletin, in his position as a guard, had promised to make an entry in Uglov's workbook, which would allow Gennady to avoid criminal liability for parasitism. However, on 3 June 1985, Uglov filed a report with the police. Initially, the police did not believe him, but Uglov then told the story to a friend who worked at the police force.

In his book, Serial Killers, maniacs and their victims, Nikolai Modestov related a different version of how Sukletin's crimes were discovered: after Shakirova returned to Sukletin, the couple again began to engage in extortion, using the same plot as they had previously. This time, the targeted taxi driver did not give money to the criminals but turned to the police. When the authorities arrived at Sukletin's home, they found a passport belonging to one of his victims and the remains of another.

On 4 June 1985, Aleksey Sukletin was arrested. Former Olympic weightlifting champion Nikolay Kolesnikov, who was then a senior security officer in Tatarstan's criminal investigation department for particularly important cases, participated in the maniac's capture. Four bags of human bones were collected from Sukletin's garden, and half a bucket of melted human fat was found in a utility room. Subsequently, Shakirova, Nikitin, and Volkov were also arrested.

== Investigation, trial and execution ==
During the first interrogations, Sukletin stated that investigators would not be able to prove his guilt in the murders. However, investigator Farid Zagidullin (afterwards, the deputy prosecutor of Tatarstan) was able to obtain a confession from Shakirova, threatening that she would be executed if she stayed silent. Frightened that her daughter would be orphaned, she began to testify, writing 70 sheets of text:

I myself did not kill anyone. He cut the meat, cooked food from the dead. We appropriated some things from the dead. Coats, skirts, jackets, shoes, books. I took only good things. The bad we burned.

- Excerpt from Madina Shakirova's testimony

Sukletin was transferred to Moscow for a forensic psychiatric examination at the Serbsky Center. During the examination, he stated that he did not feel any remorse about the crimes committed:

Why should I repent? They all were prostitutes. I helped society, cleaned it, say, from the amoral element. No, I do not regret them!

When Sukletin was asked whether he was afraid of God and the Last Judgment, he replied:

Haha, what is God to me! Myself, I am God and the Devil! I'm actually afraid of death. I'm reluctant to die now; I have lived only a little yet. Hit the road with your Last Judgment!

According to the results of the examination, Sukletin was recognized as sane, despite his attempts to fake madness. Trying to delay the investigation, he talked about crimes that he did not actually commit. He demanded to be paid 50 rubles for revealing the location of the remains of each victim, as well as interrupting court hearings in order to smoke. He recounted the smallest details of crimes committed by him with pleasure. To investigator Farid Zagidullin, he presented an autographed photo with the inscription, "In memory of the first meeting with the cannibal."

On 18 April 1986, Aleksey Sukletin was sentenced to execution by shooting. While awaiting execution, the maniac carved women's shoes from bread and presented them to Zagidullin. On 29 July 1987, the sentence was carried out.

For Madina Shakirova, the prosecution also requested the death penalty. However, the court took into account mitigating circumstances: the defendant's repentance of the crimes committed, as well as the fact that she participated in criminal activity under the threat of murder by Sukletin. She was eventually sentenced to 15 years imprisonment. Anatoly Nikitin was also sentenced to 15 years for the murder of Lidiya Fyodorova, and Rinat Volkov was sentenced to 7 years for extortion. While Shakirova was serving her sentence, inmates shunned her, dubbing her "Dina-Meat Grinder". Initially, she was kept in a colony in Kozlovka, Chuvash Republic, where other prisoners attacked her, after which she was transferred to a colony in the Plesetsky District, Arkhangelsk Oblast. In 2001, both Shakirova and Nikitin were released from prison. The media erroneously reported that she had died in 2005, but those reports were refuted in 2008, when she gave an interview to the TV programme "City". The fate of Nikitin and Volkov after release is unknown.

== In the media ==
The Sukletin case was repeatedly reflected in mass culture in post-Soviet Russia. In particular, books and chapters from books were devoted to him:

- The End of the Bloody Devil by A. K. Bataev, an employee of the Prosecutor's Office in Tatarstan (1993)
- Serial Killers. Maniacs and their victims by Nikolai Modestov (chapter: "Shashlik from the Beloved", 1999)
- Kazan Bandits 2 by Maxim Belyaev (deputy chairman of the Supreme Court of the Republic of Tatarstan) and Andrey Sheptytsky (senior assistant to the head of the Investigative Committee of Russia in the Republic of Tatarstan) [chapter: "Volga Alligator", 2013]

Aleksey Sukletin became the prototype of the hero of the third series of the Russian TV series The Method, released in 2015.

== Literature ==
- Hans Askenasy. Cannibalism: From Sacrifice to Survival — Prometheus Books, 1994. — P. 208. — 292 p. — ISBN 9780879759063.

== See also ==
- List of Russian serial killers
