= Nesfield (surname) =

Nesfield is a surname, and may refer to:

- Edward Nesfield (1900–1987), English cricketer
- John Nesfield (1836–1919), educator in British India and cleric
- William Andrews Nesfield (1793–1881), English soldier, landscape architect and artist
- William Eden Nesfield (1835–1888), English architect
