= Volga-Kama Nature Reserve =

Nature reserve in Tatarstan, Russia

- Russian: Волжско-Камский заповедник (Also: Volzhsko-Kamsky)
- IUCN category Ia (strict nature reserve)
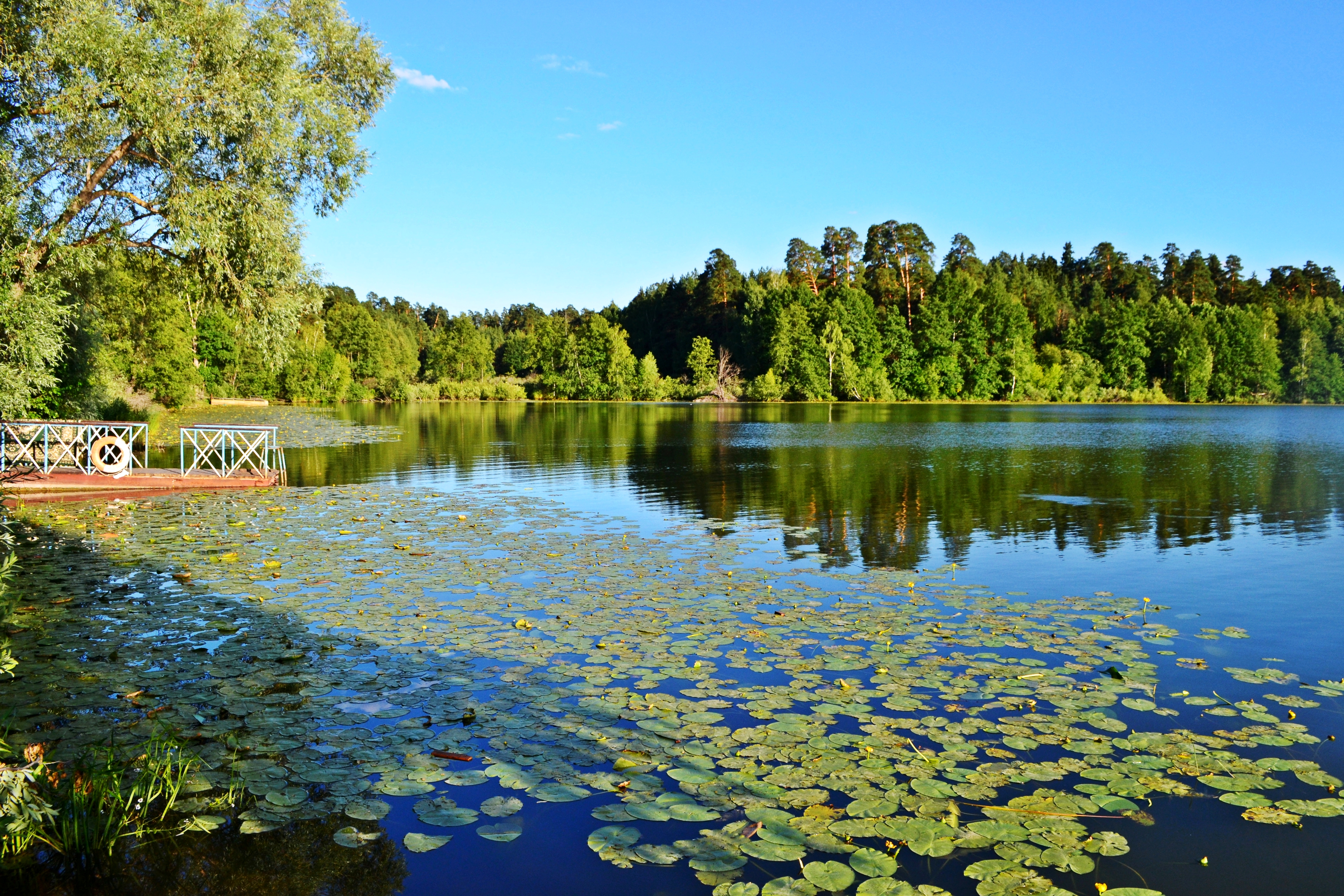
- Raif Lake, in the Volga-Kama Reserve

- Location within Russia
- Location: Tatarstan
- Nearest city: Kazan
- Coordinates: 55°18′10″N 49°17′10″E
- Area: 8,024 hectares (19,828 acres; 31 sq mi)
- Established: 1960
- Governing body: Ministry of Natural Resources and Environment (Russia)
- Website: https://vkgz.ru

Volga-Kama Nature Reserve (Russian: Волжско-Камский заповедник) (also Volzhsko-Kamsky, Vosshko-Kamisky) is a Russian 'zapovednik' (strict ecological reserve) at the confluence of the Volga River, the Kama River, and the Myosha River. There are two sections to the reserve, one on the left bank terraces of the Volga, at the actual meeting point of the rivers, the other section about 100 km up the Volga on the western outskirts of the city of Kazan. The reserve is situated in the Zelenodolsky Districts and Laishevsky District of Tatarstan. It was formally established in 1960 to protect remaining forest and forest-steppe habitat of the middle Volga region, and has an area of 8,024 ha (30.98 sq mi). A particular focus of scientific study is the effects of the Kuybyshev Reservoir on the local environment. The reservoir was completed in the mid-1950s, and is the largest reservoir in Europe. The Volga-Kama Reserve is part of a UNESCO Biosphere Reserve.

== Topography ==
The Volga-Kama Reserve has two sections:

- Raifa (30 km west of Kazan). The Raifa sector is a mostly flat or undulating karst landscape with a ravines and gullies, karst-terrain lakes, and southern taiga forest cover. Much of the forest is old-growth with trees aged 250–300 years. The Sumka River valley runs from northeast to southwest to the Volga through the Raifa section. A significant feature of this northern sector of the reserve is Raifa Lake, the largest of many lakes and marshes in the sector.
- Sarala (60 km south of Kazan). The Sarala sector is a peninsula located on the Quaternary terraces of the Kuybyshev Reservoir. The reservoir was created in 1956, and has an elevation that fluctuates from 49 to 53 meters. This sector has mostly deciduous forest cover.

The river valleys of the northern sector are at an absolute level of up to 66 meters; the higher areas in the north and south of the Raifa sector reach 120 meters.

== Climate and Ecoregion ==
Volga-Kama Reserve is located in the East European forest steppe ecoregion, which is a transition zone between the broadleaf forests of the north and the grasslands to the south. This ecoregion is characterized by a mosaic of forests, steppe, and riverine wetlands.

The climate of Volga-Kama is Humid continental climate, warm summer (Köppen climate classification (Dfb)). This climate is characterized by large swings in temperature, both diurnally and seasonally, with mild summers and cold, snowy winters. The average temperature in the Volga-Kama Reserve ranges from −12.2 °C (10.0 °F) in January to 19.5 °C (67.1 °F) in July. Precipitation ranges from 490 – 640 mm/year.

== Flora and fauna ==
The two sectors of the reserve belong to two different biogeographic zones, as they straddle a moisture demarcation contour that separates the mixed coniferous-deciduous forests to the north from the deciduous forests to the south. The primary trees of the Raifa sector are spruce and Scots pine. Green moss is important in the Raifa sector, with sphagnum moss in the wetlands of the Raifa area. The trees of the southern Sarala section are of the deciduous forest, with oak communities and secondary forest of linden and aspen. Over 600 species of algae, and over 700 species of fungi, have been recorded in the reserve. Scientists on the reserve have recorded 844 species of vascular plants.

The animal life of the northern sector (Raifa) are those of the southern taiga: voles, shrews, forest mice, bats, squirrels, marten, foxes, hares, and moose. The Sarala sector is more southern in character, with hares, wild boar, and roe deer. Beaver were reintroduced in 1996. Scientists on the reserve have recorded 50 species of mammals in the borders. Birds include forest birds and waterfowl, reflecting the variety of habitat in the area. The area of the Sarali sector has the highest breeding density of White-tailed eagle in Europe, with two of the active nests located less than 300m away from each other.

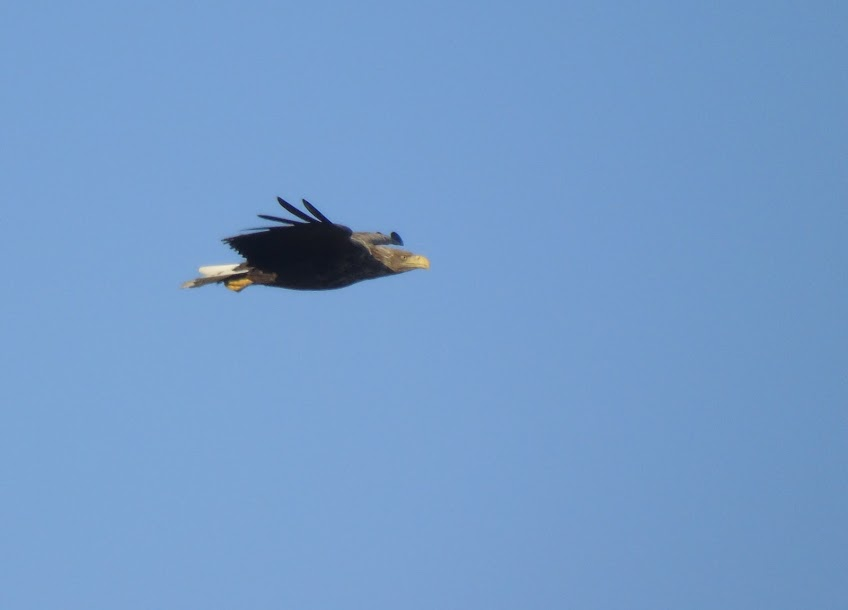
White-tailed eagle flying past in the Volga-Kama Reserve

230 species of birds have been recorded, including such rarities as Saker Falcon and Eastern Imperial Eagle, the latter of which also bred until 2017 in the immediate surroundings of the reserve. 41 species of fish have been recorded.

== Ecoeducation and access ==
As a strict nature reserve, the Volga-Kama Reserve is mostly closed to the general public, although scientists and those with 'environmental education' purposes can make arrangements with park management for visits, including to the Sarali section of the reserve, where tours are offered to a hide overlooking one of the best areas for the eagles. There are limited 'ecotourist' routes in the reserve, however, that are open to local residents, but require permits to be obtained in advance. The reserve sponsors an arboretum and a nature museum; they are visited by over 10 thousand people. The main office is in the city of Kazan.

== See also ==
- List of Russian Nature Reserves (class 1a 'zapovedniks')
- National Parks of Russia
