= Lupták =

Lupták or Ľupták are Slovak surnames. The feminine forms are Luptáková resp. Ľuptáková. Notable people with these surnames include:

- Branislav Ľupták (born 1991), Slovak football player
- Erik Ľupták (born 1990), Slovak football player
- Ján Ľupták (1946–2025), Slovak politician
- Jozef Lupták (born 1969), Slovak cellist and artistic director
- Juraj Lupták (1942–1987), Slovak rapist and serial killer
- Lukáš Lupták (born 1990), Slovak football player
- Martina Luptáková (born 1977), Slovak basketball player

== See also ==
- Laura Ľupťáková (born 1995), Slovak model and beauty pageant titleholder
