= Sumka (river) =

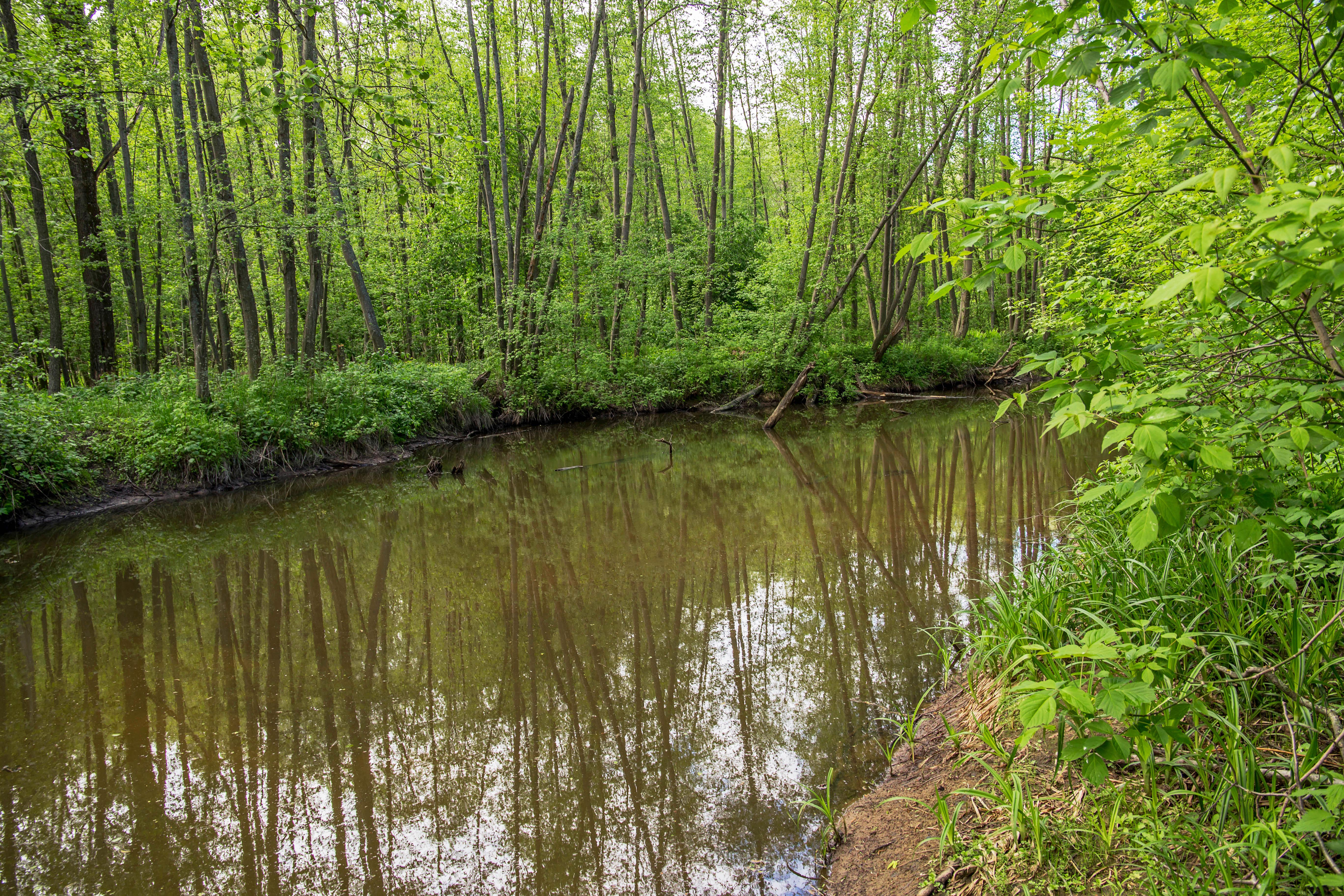

Location
- Country: Tatarstan, Russia

Physical characteristics
- Source
  - location: Gremyachy Klyuch, Zelenodolsky District
  - coordinates: 55°58′54″N 48°58′16″E
- Mouth: Volga
  - location: Kuybyshev Reservoir near Vasilyevo, Zelenodolsky District
  - coordinates: 55.8293°N 48.6464°E
  - elevation: 53 m (174 ft)
- Length: 37 km (23 mi)
- Basin size: 250 km^{2} (97 sq mi)

Basin features
- Progression: Volga→ Caspian Sea

The Sumka (Russian: Сумка; Tatar: Сумка) is a river in Zelenodolsky District of the Republic of Tatarstan, Russia, a left-bank tributary of the Volga. It is 37 kilometres (23 mi) long, and its drainage basin covers 250 square kilometres (97 mi^{2}). It begins near Gremyachy Klyuch and flows to the Kuybyshev Reservoir, Volga, forming the western border of Vasilyevo, Tatarstan.

The river valley comes through the Raifa section of the Volga-Kama Reserve. There the Sumka passes several major lakes, the biggest being Raifa lake. The maximal mineralization 200 mg/L. The maximal water discharge is 30 cubic metres per second (1,100 cu ft/s). The river used to dry up in summer.
