= Emil J. Brach =

American businessman (1859–1947)

- Born: May 11, 1859; Schoenwald, Grand Duchy of Baden
- Died: October 29, 1947 (aged 88); Chicago, Illinois, US
- Citizenship: United States
- Occupations: Confectioner, entrepreneur
- Known for: Founder, Brach's Candy
- Spouse(s): Katherine Cunningham, Marie Hult

Emil Julius Brach (May 11, 1859 − October 29, 1947) was the founder of Brach's Confections, an American candy company.

Brach was born in 1859 in Schoenwald, Grand Duchy of Baden, to Martin and Wilhelmina Brach. The family migrated to Burlington, Iowa, in 1866. As a young man, he attended Burlington Business College and then managed a restaurant and confectionery store.

In 1880, he moved to Chicago, where he got his first major job at a candy-making company. He eventually became a very high-income salesman, managing to save up $15,000 to invest in a failed candy manufacturing company.

Brach started his own candy store and factory, Brach's Confections in 1904. Brach's business acuity and the quality of his candy quickly led to his company's success. His fourteen-year-old son, Frank, was the company's first salesman, securing their first large customer, Siegel, Cooper & Co. The company also sold candy to A. M. Rothschild & Company Store, another major department store. By 1911, the company produced 25 tons of candy a week, a figure that rose to 1,000 tons in 1918.

In 1913, the Brach Company was the first candy manufacturer to establish a food safety laboratory. Ingredients and samples were scientifically tested to ensure their purity. In 1922, Brach built the largest candy factory of its time on Chicago's West Side, providing employment to thousands. During World War II, Brach supplied much of the candy in emergency rations and for army post exchanges. During the war, the company underplayed the German heritage of its founder.

Brach retired in 1924 when he moved to Florida with his second wife. He remained an important part of the company's marketing strategy and appeared in many advertisements to emphasize the candy manufacturer's humble origins and the importance of family. He died in 1947.

== See also ==
- Helen Brach (daughter-in-law)
