= Helen Brach =

American multimillionaire

- Born: Helen Marie Voorhees; November 10, 1911; Unionport, Ohio, U.S.
- Disappeared: February 17, 1977 (aged 65); Rochester, Minnesota, U.S.
- Status: Declared legally dead in May 1984
- Spouse: Frank Brach

Helen Marie Brach (née Voorhees; born November 10, 1911 – disappeared February 17, 1977) was an American multimillionaire widow whose wealth had come from marrying into the E. J. Brach & Sons Candy Company fortune; she endowed the Helen V. Brach Foundation to promote animal welfare in 1974. Brach disappeared on February 17, 1977, and in May 1984 she was declared legally dead, as of the date of her disappearance. An investigation into the case uncovered serious criminal activity associated with Chicago horse stable owners, including Silas Jayne and Richard Bailey. More than a decade later Bailey was charged with, but not convicted of, conspiring to murder Brach; he eventually received a sentence of 30 years after being convicted of defrauding her.

== Early life ==
Helen Brach was born on November 10, 1911, on a small farm in Unionport, Ohio. Helen married her high school sweetheart in 1928; the couple had divorced by the time she was 21. She found work at a country club in Palm Beach, Florida, where she met and married Frank Brach, son of Emil J. Brach and heir to the E. J. Brach & Sons Candy Company. The couple built a home in Fisher Island, Florida, shortly afterwards. The couple purchased another home in Glenview, Illinois, closer to the Brach company's factory in Chicago. Helen and Frank spent most of their time in South Florida. Her husband died in 1970.

== Circumstances of disappearance ==
After a routine medical check-up at the Mayo Clinic in Rochester, Minnesota, Brach left for a flight to return to her mansion in Glenview, Illinois, a suburb north of Chicago, on February 17, 1977. A gift shop assistant near the clinic insisted that Brach had said, "I'm in a hurry, my houseman is waiting." This is the last sighting of Brach by an independent witness. The crew on the commercial airliner on which Brach was supposed to return to Illinois did not report seeing her on the flight; however, Brach's houseman/chauffeur, Jack Matlick, said that he collected her at O'Hare Airport. Matlick further asserted that Brach spent four days at home, that she made no phone calls, and that he dropped her off at O'Hare for a flight to Florida.

Matlick was the focus of police attention during the investigation. He repeatedly proclaimed his innocence and angrily denied to reporters that he knew what happened to Brach, but a former federal agent who worked on the case claimed after Matlick's death that he was indeed responsible for her disappearance. Brach's brother was of the opinion that Matlick had murdered his sister without any involvement from Richard Bailey or horse racing racketeers. On February 14, 2011, three days before the 34th anniversary of Brach's disappearance, Matlick died in a Pennsylvania nursing home at the age of 79.

== Richard Bailey and the horse racket connection ==
In May 1984, Brach was declared legally dead, as of the date of her February 17, 1977 disappearance. No one was ever convicted in her disappearance, although Bailey was sentenced to thirty years in prison for defrauding her.

According to a case filed in the United States Court of Appeals for the Seventh Circuit, Bailey, the owner of Bailey Stables and Country Club Stables, targeted wealthy middle-aged or older women with little knowledge of the horse business who had recently been widowed or divorced. In 1975, Bailey's brother, Paul, sold three horses to Brach for $98,000; unknown to Brach, Bailey also participated in the sale, and the horses were worth less than $20,000. Brach also bought a group of expensive brood mares. Early in 1977, Bailey arranged an extensive showing for Brach, hoping to persuade her to invest $150,000 in more horses. An appraiser Brach hired recommended she invest nothing in training one of her original three purchases, contrary to the $50,000 estimate of the trainer recommended by Bailey.

In 1989, the investigation was reopened and turned up evidence of criminal activity by associates of Bailey, including Silas Jayne. Bailey was charged with conspiring with several others (named but not charged) to kill Brach; however some observers, including Brach's brother, have questioned if Bailey had in fact been guilty of the crime. Bailey was not convicted of Brach's murder but sentenced to thirty years for defrauding her; the judge made it clear that the sentence reflected evidence that Bailey was involved in a conspiracy to murder her. On March 21, 2005, in a tersely worded two-paragraph opinion, the Seventh Circuit Court of Appeals rejected Bailey's request for a new sentencing hearing for the fraud charges to take into account new evidence suggesting his innocence of the murder conspiracy, saying that the "new evidence does not establish by clear and convincing evidence that the defendant is actually innocent of conspiring to murder Helen Brach and soliciting her murder." Bailey was released on July 25, 2019. In 2022, Bailey released a book with Dorrance Publishing Company titled Golden Tongue: The Innocent Man that Killed Her? in which he proclaims his innocence.

Brach's parents and husband are interred in Unionport, Ohio, near her birthplace of Hopedale. The marble monument includes an empty tomb with her name on it. In addition, two of Helen's dogs, Candy and Sugar, are buried there.

== See also ==
- List of people who disappeared
- Silas Jayne
