= Unionport, Ohio =

Unincorporated community in Ohio, U.S.

Coordinates: 40°21′29″N 80°50′44″W

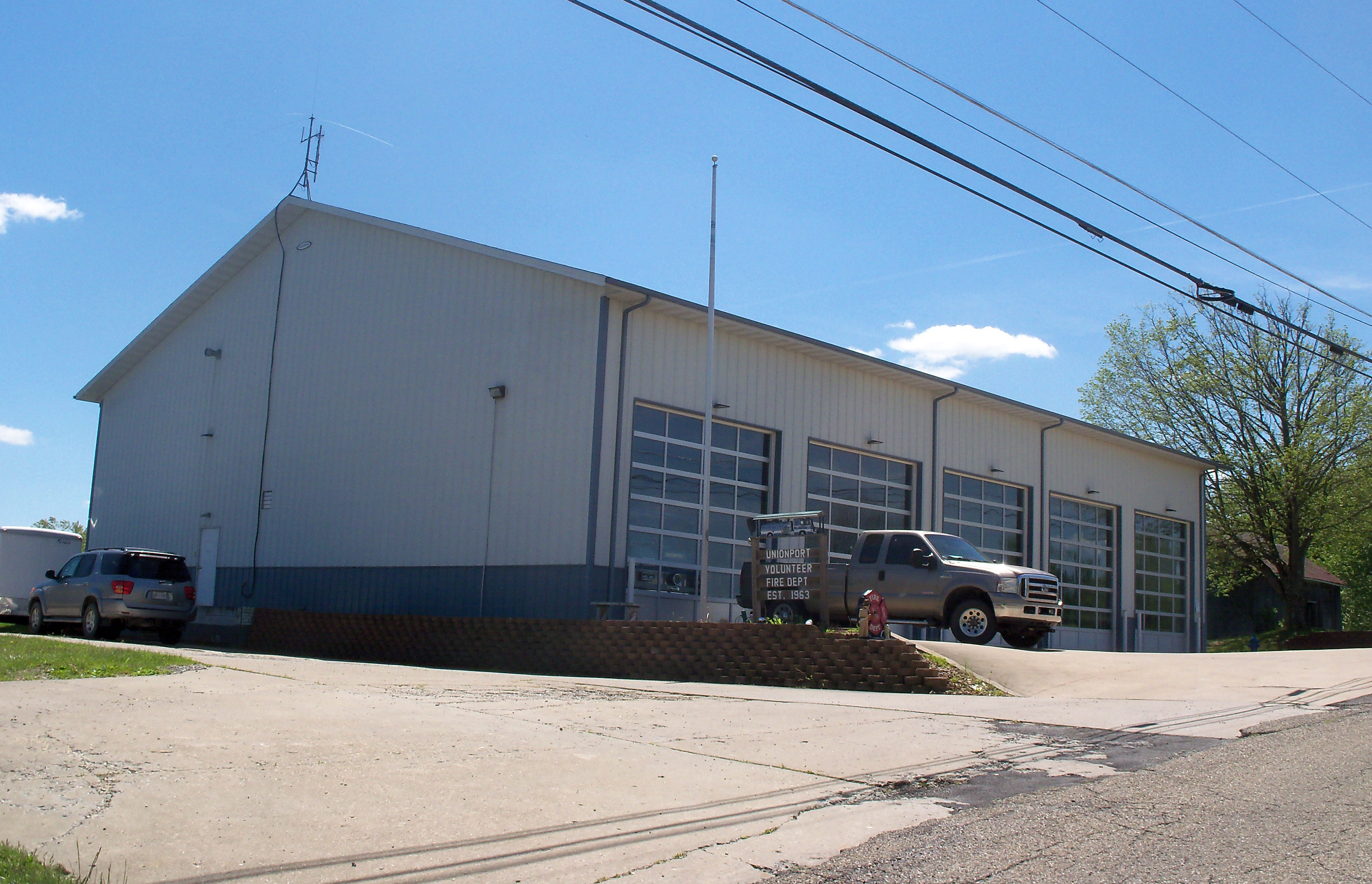
Unionport Volunteer Fire Department

Unionport is a small unincorporated community in Jefferson County, Ohio. It is best known as the birthplace of millionaire, Helen Brach, who was the center of media attention in 1977, when she disappeared. Unionport is located on the banks of the Cross Creek, a large tributary of the Ohio River approximately 20 miles east.

Unionport was platted in 1852. A post office called Unionport was established in 1855, and remained in operation until 2002.
