= Silas Jayne =

American mobster (1907–1987)

Silas Carter Jayne (July 3, 1907 – July 13, 1987) was a Chicago-based stable owner, horse trainer, and horse trader who was heavily involved in criminal activity, including fraud, intimidation, arson, and murder. He covered up the infamous Peterson-Schuessler murders and, much later, arranged for the killing of his stepbrother George. In 1980, Silas was also tried and acquitted of arson, after he allegedly persuaded a former cellmate of his to start a fire in a stable, where men against whom Silas had a grudge kept their horses. Silas died of leukemia in 1987, aged 80.

== Life history and background ==
Jayne was born on July 3, 1907, in Cuba Township, in Lake County, Illinois. He was one of four boys and eight girls born to Arthur and Katherine Jayne. Silas had a half-brother, George William Jayne, born in 1923 to his mother and her employer, a married attorney named George William Spunner. When Silas was tried for rape at age 17, his stepfather, acting as his attorney, wrote to the judge saying that Silas was a wild young man who would not be hurt by a year in jail. Silas was convicted and served one year at Pontiac Correctional Center.

Jayne and his younger brothers, DeForest and Frank, and half-brother, George, were skilled horse trainers and riders, who owned and operated a number of stables in the Chicago area during the 1930s. In 1932, Silas opened the Idle Hour Stable at Lincoln and Peterson avenues on Chicago's northwest side. About the same time, Silas and his brothers began operating the Elston Riding Academy at 5663 Elston Avenue in Chicago. The academy hosted the Elston Saddle Club which held an annual horse show and rodeo featuring the Jayne brothers and their students.

In 1933, Frank Jayne began operating a livestock hauling and trading business in Woodstock, Illinois. The Jayne brothers shipped feral horses from the Western United States by railroad to Woodstock, where they were herded through the streets to Frank's corral south of the city. The best horses were trained and the rest were shipped to Rockford, Illinois to be slaughtered for dog food. In 1936, George Jayne began holding annual horse shows at his Sportsman's Riding Stables in Morton Grove, Illinois. The following year, the Elston Saddle Club held a show in Woodstock. Frank Jayne purchased a farm west of Elgin, Illinois, which he called Our Day Farm.

DeForest Jayne earned many trophies for his horsemanship and was the instructor at the Elston Riding Academy. On October 15, 1938, DeForest's fiancée, Mae Sweeny, committed suicide by swallowing arsenic. Five days later, DeForest, dressed in his best Western attire, killed himself with a 12-gauge shotgun on Sweeny's grave. By the time of his death, DeForest had acquired twenty acres and a stable, that he bequeathed to his half-brother, George. After DeForest's death, Silas established Green Tree Stables at 4701 Cumberland Avenue in the Chicago suburb of Norridge. On June 3, 1940, a fire killed ten horses at the Green Tree Stables. This was the first of several suspicious fires linked to Silas. Silas and his employees were able to free 35 other horses from the burning building.

Jayne had acquired a reputation for bullying behavior. In order to intimidate rivals, he would falsely claim that he had served time for murder. In one case when he was losing in a horse show competition, Silas and his brothers beat the rider who was winning until he could no longer compete. Because of Jayne's reputation for violence, he was able to demand a 10% stake of the profits in horse shows held near Chicago.

Jayne sold virtually worthless horses to prosperous men with daughters in their early teenage years, claiming that the horses were of the top quality needed if the daughters were to become champion riders. Parents allowed their daughters to spend extended periods of time at Jayne's stables unchaperoned. Jayne boasted to his associates of having molested many of these underage girls. When fathers complained about the poor quality of horses they had bought from him, he would tell them that their daughters had become notorious among his employees for their promiscuity. Though the accusation may have been groundless, scandal-wary fathers rarely pressed the point.

It was suspected that allegations against Jayne were not investigated because he had friendly relations with police officers. He was not a made man of the Chicago Outfit, but his Idle Hour Stables were patronised by "Mad Sam" DeStefano and other prominent gangsters. It was said that the gangsters "played cowboy" there, riding around on horses and firing guns into the air.

In the early 1950s, Silas wanted his half-brother, George, to purchase his Green Tree Stables, but George, whose Sportsman's Riding Stables was prospering, refused. Shortly thereafter, while George and his family were wintering in Florida, his house, located at the Sportsman's Riding Stables, burned down. The cause of the fire was never determined, but George suspected that Silas was responsible. A month after the fire, George sold Sportsman's Riding Stables, and after that he bought Green Tree Stables from Silas, renaming it Happy Days Stables. In 1954, Silas moved his Idle Hour Stables to a larger facility at 8600 West Higgins Road in Park Ridge, Illinois, not far from George's Happy Days Stables.

Ethan Hansen and his sons, Curtis and Kenneth, operated a stable not far from Silas' relocated Idle Hour Stables. Curtis was an enforcer for the Chicago Outfit tied to Sam DeStefano and Frank Schweihs. The Hansen stable went out of business after several accidents resulted in the deaths of two young stable hands, after which Curtis Hansen maintained a close relationship with Silas Jayne and Kenneth Hansen was hired to work at the Idle Hour Stables.

== Peterson–Schuessler murders ==
On October 18, 1955, the naked bodies of three young boys, John Schuessler, 13, his brother Anton Jr., 11, and their friend Robert Peterson, 14, were found in a ditch in the Robinson Woods Forest Preserve on the northwest side of Chicago. When found, they had been missing for two days. The boys had traveled from Jefferson Park to downtown Chicago to see Walt Disney Productions' The African Lion at the Loop Theater, 165 North State Street, on the afternoon of October 16. Nearly forty years later, ATF agents investigating the 1977 disappearance of candy heiress Helen Brach were told by informants that Silas Jayne's former employee, Kenneth Hansen, had boasted of committing the murders at the Idle Hour Stables. Hansen had threatened others that they would "end up like the Peterson boy." A second informant, Red Wemette, had told the FBI of Hansen's boasts in the 1970s, but apparently no action was taken.

It emerged that Hansen, who was 22 years old at the time, had met Peterson and the Schuesslers while they were hitchhiking, having last been seen by a classmate at the Monte Cristo Bowling Alley on 3326 West Montrose, about eight miles from the Loop Theater. Hansen lured them into the Idle Hour Stables under the pretext of showing them horses. When Peterson discovered Hansen sexually abusing the Schuessler brothers, Hansen attacked all three and killed them. Jayne became enraged at Hansen when he discovered what he had done, but realized the murders on his property had the potential to ruin him and concealed the crime. The bodies were put in a station wagon and disposed of. The original forensic investigators in the case believed that marks on the bodies had been caused by the floor mats of a Packard station wagon model that had been owned by both Hansen and Jayne in 1955. The barn in which the murders allegedly occurred burned down on May 15, 1956, in a suspected arson.

Neighbors had reported to the police that they had heard screams from the stables on the day the boys disappeared, but the leads were not followed up, despite the stable's proximity to the site where the bodies were found. According to a detective who worked on the case, Kenneth Hansen had preyed on hundreds of boys before his 1995 arrest and conviction for the murders. Hansen's conviction was overturned five years later on the grounds that the jury should not have heard prejudicial testimony regarding his frequent cruising the streets in search of boys to prey upon, whom he termed "chicken". Found guilty at a 2002 retrial with a subsequent affirmation of the verdict in a 2004 appeal, Hansen was sentenced to life imprisonment. He died at Pontiac Correctional Center on September 12, 2007.

== Attacks on George Jayne ==
In October 1959, George Jayne moved his stable business from the Happy Days Stables to the 95-acre Tri-Color Farm near his home in Inverness, Illinois. Silas' competition with George, both in business and at horse shows, became intense and led to a prolonged effort to kill George. Cheryl Rude was a professional rider who went to work for George after she was fired by Silas. At the Oak Brook Hounds Horse Show in 1961, Rude won a jumping class over protests from Silas, and George's daughter beat Silas' best horse to take the top prize, after which Silas stood in the middle of the horse ring and shouted at George "I'll never talk to you again, you bastard!" This was the beginning of a campaign of harassment against George.

In 1962, shots were fired at George's office and the office was burglarized. At various times, George's tires were punctured, lug nuts on his truck tires were loosened, sugar was poured into his gas tank, cars attempted to run him off the road at night, two of his horses were poisoned, and dynamite was left by his back door, but the fuse fizzled out. In March 1963, while working late at his office, George, perhaps sensing danger, departed in a borrowed car leaving the lights on and his own car at the office. That night twenty-eight bullets were fired into the office. In 1965, Eddie Moran confessed that he and another man were paid $300 to kill George, and it was they who had fired the shots into George's office in 1963. In May 1963, when George's horse beat Silas' at the Lake Forest Horse Show, Silas again threatened George, "I'll kill you, you son of a bitch!" After this on five or more occasions Silas made more threats to kill George.

== Murder of Cheryl Rude ==
On June 14, 1965, George Jayne asked his 22-year-old employee Cheryl Rude to move his Cadillac. When she turned the ignition key, a bomb composed of three sticks of dynamite exploded, killing her. George believed that he was the intended target of the bomb, and that Silas was responsible for planting it. Sheriff's investigators agreed with this assessment.

On July 14, Chicago police found bomb making equipment in the home of Haladane Cleminson, who told them that James Blottiaux had asked him how to wire a car bomb. Bomb making equipment was also found in Blottiaux's home, and handwriting experts tied him to a receipt for explosives. Blottiaux, who was a handyman at Silas Jayne's Idle Hour Stables, told investigators he had heard Jayne offer Eddie Moran $10,000 to bomb George Jayne's car. A white Buick had been seen at George's Tri-Colour Stables shortly before the bombing. Knowing that Blottiaux did repair work at his friend Thomas Hanna's used car dealership, authorities questioned Hanna who said he did not have a white Buick on his lot. In 1967, the evidence implicating Blottiaux in the Rude murder, including the receipt signed by Blottiaux, was destroyed by the Chicago Police.

Thereafter, the case went cold for nearly thirty years. Then when authorities requestioned Hanna, he told them that Blottiaux had borrowed a white 1960 Buick LeSabre from his lot on the day of the murder. When Blottiaux returned the car, he was visibly upset and kept repeating, "I killed the wrong person." When Hanna asked what he was talking about, Blottiaux vomited. Blottiaux confessed the murder to Hanna, who sold the Buick LeSabre as soon as he could. On December 16, 1997, Blottiaux was charged with Cheryl Rude's murder.

At his trial in July 1999, Haladane Cleminson testified under immunity that he had helped Blottiaux make the car bomb, and Hanna and his wife testified that Blottiaux had confessed the murder to them. Silas Jayne, who was deceased by the time of the trial, paid Blottiaux $10,000 for the murder. Blottiaux was found guilty and on September 10, 1999, sentenced to 200–300 years. After his conviction Blottiaux admitted his guilt. He confessed that he saw Rude get into the car, but did nothing to warn her. Blottiaux was denied parole on September 24, 2020.

== Indiana Dunes State Park disappearances ==
Ann Miller, 21, and her two friends Patricia Blough, 19, and Renee Bruhl, 19, vanished from Indiana Dunes State Park on July 2, 1966, a little more than a year after the murder of Cheryl Rude. At around 10:00 a.m. the women arrived at the state park and hiked to a location about 100 yards from the Lake Michigan beach. A couple claimed to have seen the women leave their belongings on the beach and enter the water together around 12 p.m. The witnesses later spotted them conversing with an unidentified man sailing a white boat, 14-to-16-feet-long, with a blue cabin and an outboard motor. According to the witnesses, the women boarded the boat and sailed westward with the captain. Around sunset, the couple discovered that the women's things were still on the beach, unclaimed. They informed a park ranger of their findings. The women have never been seen again.

Blough, Miller, and Bruhl frequently rode horses at George Jayne's Tri-Color Stables. The phone numbers for George and Silas Jayne were found among one of the missing women's possessions. Investigators have explored the possibility that Blough, Miller and/or Bruhl may have witnessed the bomb that killed Cheryl Rude being planted. After the women vanished Silas Jayne allegedly told a sheriff that he had three human bodies buried beneath his house. Law enforcement took the comment seriously and planned to search Silas's property; the sheriff involved was killed in a farming accident before the search took place. As a result, the lead was left cold. One of Silas Jayne's workers had a blue and white motorboat that he often took to the Indiana dunes. Investigators were informed that the boat had been destroyed by fire when they inquired about it.

== Conspiracy to murder George Jayne ==
A few days after the murder of Cheryl Rude, Silas Jayne offered Stephen Grod and Edward Moran $15,000 to kill George Jayne. In an effort to double-cross Silas, Grod and Moran contacted George and proposed that he hide out until after they collect their fee from Silas. George called the Cook County Illinois Sheriff's Police, who had Grod set up a meeting with Silas. A sheriff's detective, posing as a third hitman, accompanied Grod to the meeting where Silas gave Grod $1,000 as a down payment. There was now sufficient evidence to charge Silas Jayne with conspiracy to commit murder.

Grod was the chief witness against Jayne when the case came to trial in March 1966. As Grod was walking into the courthouse, Silas Jayne's brother Frank handed him an article about a key witness in a criminal case being murdered. When called to testify, Grod had a sudden case of amnesia, stating under oath, "I can't even remember what I had for breakfast this morning. I'm sick." As a result, the case against Jayne was dropped and Grod was fined $1,000 and jailed for thirty days. In November 1965 Silas Jayne sold the Idle Hour Stables and moved to Our Day Farm.

After the conspiracy charges against Silas Jayne were dropped, George Jayne's office was burglarized. Silas told one of George's employees "I gave the IRS all the dope on him [George]. We got enough out of his office to put him in jail for good." George was subsequently indicted for income tax fraud. A jury found him not guilty on November 2, 1966. In 1967, Silas and George Jayne's six sisters called a family meeting to resolve their differences. According to George's wife, speaking through her attorney, George agreed at that meeting not to show horses in the hunter and jumper classes. She did not say what, if anything, Silas agreed to. Silas said that the meeting ended with the brothers being friends.

== Killing of Frank Michelle Jr. ==
Fearing more attacks, George Jayne hired Frank Michelle Sr., a former chief of police of Inverness, to provide security for his home and business. He hired Michelle's son, Frank Michelle Jr., to surreptitiously place on Silas Jayne's car a transmitter which would alert George whenever the car came within five miles. The transmitter was periodically monitored and when it stopped transmitting after twelve days, Frank Michelle Jr. was dispatched to change the battery. On January 19, 1969, Michelle's wife dropped him off near Silas Jayne's home at Our Day Farm.

Michelle would not have found the car with the transmitter, because Jayne had traded it in for another car. According to Jayne, his door bell rang and when he asked who was there, he was shot at through the door. He returned fire and saw Michelle, who he did not recognize, crawl away leaving a bloody trail on the lawn. Jayne grabbed additional guns and followed Michelle shooting him to death. Michelle was shot nine times with three different weapons: an M1 carbine and .22- and .38-calibre pistols. The shooting was ruled to be self-defense and no charges were brought against Jayne. Jayne boasted of crushing Michelle's testicles using vise-grip pliers. When investigators tried to verify this claim, they discovered that the coroner's report and medical records had gone missing.

== Murder of George Jayne ==
=== Death and investigation ===
On October 28, 1970, George Jayne was fatally shot in the heart through a basement window in his Inverness home with family on his son's 16th birthday. A neighbor boy identified the get away car as red and white with a license plate beginning 936. Melvin Adams, a 37-year-old dishwasher from Posen, Illinois, became a suspect when he was spotted driving a red-and-white Ford with a license number beginning 936. When questioned Adams was found to be carrying $10,000 in cash. Seventeen of the bills in Adams possession were found to have Silas Jayne's fingerprints. In order to keep Jayne from fleeing while the investigation continued, agents of the Bureau of Alcohol, Tobacco and Firearms raided Jayne's home at Our Day Farm confiscating eighteen weapons. Jayne was charged with illegal possession of firearms by a felon (the felony being the rape he was convicted of at age 17 ). When arraigned, Jayne was required to surrender his passport.

In May 1971 George Jayne's widow, Marion, accompanied by Illinois State Police investigator David Hamm, offered $25,000 in cash to Melvin Adams as a reward for information. Adams told them that Julius Barnes was the shooter. He also told where the murder weapon was hidden and where Barnes could be found. Rather than take the $25,000 reward, Adams accepted an offer of immunity from prosecution. Barnes' fingerprints were on the murder weapon and he also decided to cooperate with authorities. Adams and Barnes said that Edwin Nefeld, the chief of detectives at the Markham, Illinois police department, had been hired by Silas Jayne to assassinate George.

Nefeld subcontracted the murder to Adams, and Adams in turn subcontracted Barnes. Silas Jayne's handyman, Joseph LaPlaca, was also involved in the plot. Silas Jayne initially wanted Adams to kidnap George so that he could murder him himself, but Adams argued that assassination would be less risky. After the murder Jayne paid $30,000 to Adams, who passed $12,500 to Barnes. On May 22, 1971, Jayne, LaPlaca, Barnes, and Nefeld were indicted for the murder of George Jayne. In a plea deal, Nefeld pleaded guilty to conspiracy to commit murder and testified against the other defendants in exchange for the dropping of murder charges. He was sentenced to 1 to 3 years in prison.

=== Conviction and sentence ===
Silas Jayne, Joseph LaPlaca, and Julius Barnes went on trial for murder on April 4, 1973. Jayne was represented by famed attorney F. Lee Bailey. Barnes retracted his confession and Jayne denied everything. The jurors were permitted to find the defendants guilty of the lesser charge of conspiracy to commit murder. Barnes, the shooter, was found guilty of murder, and Jayne and LaPlaca were found guilty of conspiracy to commit murder. Barnes was sentenced to 25–35 years in prison, and Jayne and LaPlaca each received a sentence of 6–20 years, the maximum under Illinois law for conspiracy to murder.

After his conviction, Marion Jayne sued Silas Jayne for $7 million in damages for her husband's death. In 1973 she was awarded $1 million. In 1980, Silas offered Marion $250,000 to settle the matter, but she refused. Silas Jayne was imprisoned at the Vienna Correctional Center in southern Illinois. Jayne's cellmate said that Jayne was allowed to keep his horses at the prison's stable and to ride unescorted into a nearby town to buy whiskey. Also Jayne's brother, Frank, regularly transported prostitutes from Chicago to the prison to have sex with Jayne. On May 23, 1979, Jayne was paroled after having served six years.

== Disappearance of Helen Brach ==
On February 17, 1977, 65-year-old Helen Marie Voorhees Brach attended a scheduled checkup at the Mayo Clinic in Rochester, Minnesota. The only issue the local medical professionals identified with her was her weight. Helen walked back to her hotel after paying the medical bill. She made a detour at a gift shop and spent $41 on cosmetics and towels while claiming that her "houseman" was waiting for her. As she was travelling alone and no one was observed with her, investigators are unsure of what she meant.

Helen did have a houseman named Jack Matlick. After Helen's husband, Frank, died, he helped manage her home. One of the richest candy manufacturers in the world, Frank had owned the E. J. Brach & Sons Candy Company. Helen was working as a coat-check lady at the Palm Beach Country Club in Florida when he first met her. After being married, they split their time between renting a home in Palm Beach in the winter and living in Chicago, during the summer. Frank died in 1970; her estimated net worth after his death was $20 million.

The flight crew could not recall anyone who matched Helen's description on the trip that day, despite Matlick's claim that he met her at O'Hare International Airport. However, a significant amount of time had passed before they were questioned. Furthermore, Matlick claimed that after he had picked Helen up at O'Hare, he took her back to her house in Glenview, Illinois. He told his wife over the phone that he would be staying in Glenview that weekend since he had work to complete. Investigators concluded that this was out of character for him because he usually lived apart from Helen in a home she owned in Schaumburg, Illinois. Matlick would later tell police that Helen had stayed in Glenview that weekend preparing for her upcoming trip to Florida. But friends who dropped by to visit her were told she was unavailable, and Helen did not call anyone.

Richard Bailey, whom Brach had been dating at the time of her disappearance and who was meant to meet her when she went to Florida, resisted attempts to question him after hiring an attorney; he refused to even acknowledge knowing Brach. He was a prominent player in the city's equestrian industry and was the proprietor of Country Club Stables and Bailey Stables. Around Chicago, Bailey had a reputation as a con-artist who preyed on wealthy middle-aged ladies who had recently been widowed or divorced in order to defraud them of their money through poor horse investments. Helen had been introduced to the horse industry by Bailey; according to her accountant, she had spent $250,000 on horses.

Helen had purchased some horses from Bailey and his brother for considerably more than they were worth. Helen was declared legally dead in 1984; until 1989, when a prosecutor looking into horse fraud gave Helen's case more attention, it remained open but inactive. It was revealed that Bailey was acquainted with Silas Jayne. At the age of 79, Matlick died at a Pennsylvania nursing facility on February 14, 2011. Brach's brother was of the opinion that Matlick had murdered his sister without any involvement from Richard Bailey or horse racing racketeers.

However, authorities believe that both Matlick and Bailey were both engaged in Helen's alleged kidnapping. They hypothesised that Helen realised Bailey had been defrauding her and was preparing to report him to the police and have him jailed when he conspired with others and had her killed. In 1994, Bailey was accused of committing several acts of fraud as well as conspiring to commit murder, soliciting to commit murder, and causing the murder of Helen. Bailey entered a guilty plea to racketeering, conspiracy, mail and wire fraud, and money laundering. But before a federal judge, he denied defrauding Helen or being connected to her abduction. A federal judge ruled that Bailey had conspired to kill Helen after hearing the evidence against him in Helen's case and gave him a life sentence. Later, the term was lowered to 30 years. Although it is thought that Bailey did not act alone in Helen's case, no one else was ever put on trial in connection with her abduction.

In 2005, investigators announced that an individual (Joseph Plemmons) had come forward with information about Helen's alleged murder. Helen's body was burned at a steel mill off Interstate 65 near Gary, Indiana, according to Plemmons, a horseman who had known Helen. Plemmons also admitted that he and ten other people beat and shot Helen to death at the direction of Silas Jayne and his nephew (Frank Jayne). Plemmons confessed to being the shooter after agreeing to a deal that would protect him from legal action. He claimed Helen was killed so she would not report to the police, and added that Bailey was unrelated to the homicide. He named nine of the conspirators; the tenth (a woman) he did not identify because he claimed he never knew her name. According to Plemmons, the woman pretended to be Helen and used her plane ticket home from the Mayo Clinic; Helen herself was actually driven home. There was no evidence available to charge the alleged accomplices with anything relating to Helen's case.

Plemmons was a con-artist who gave conflicting accounts of his role in Helen's death. However, his earlier testimony had assisted in the murder conviction of another individual; at Kenneth Hansen's 1994 trial for the 1955 killings of the Peterson-Schuessler boys, he provided evidence against Hansen. A ruby ring, which according to him dropped off Brach's finger when he was getting rid of her body, is one piece of evidence that backed his statement. He kept the ring and gave it to the police afterwards, who later identified it as hers. Plemmons' testimony prompted Bailey to request a fresh sentence hearing, claiming that the proof showed he was not responsible for Helen's abduction and that he should be freed from prison as a result. However, in 2005, the court dismissed his appeal, concluding that the evidence was insufficient to support a reduction in his sentence and, in any event, did not disprove his involvement in Helen's murder. Plemmons lives in Florida; at the age of 90, Bailey was freed from prison in 2019. In 2022, Bailey released a book with the Dorrance Publishing Company entitled Golden Tongue: The Innocent Man that Killed Her?

== See also ==
- Disappearance of Helen Brach
- Horse murders scandal

== Cited works and further reading ==
- Lindberg, Richard C. (2006). Shattered Sense of Innocence: The 1955 Murders of Three Chicago Children. Carbondale: Southern Illinois University Press. ISBN 978-0-809-32736-2.
- Nash, Jay Robert (1983). Open Files: A Narrative Encyclopedia of the World's Greatest Unsolved Crimes. Maryland: M. Evans. pp. 100–101. ISBN 978-0-070-45907-6.
- Newton, Michael (2009). The Encyclopedia of Unsolved Crimes. New York: Facts on File. pp. 76-77. ISBN 978-0-816-07818-9.
- Taylor, Troy (2015). The Two Lost Girls: The Mystery of the Grimes Sisters. Canada: Whitechapel Productions. ISBN 978-1-892-52398-3.
- Taylor, Troy (2009). True Crime: Illinois: The State's Most Notorious Criminal Cases. Pennsylvania: Stackpole Books. ISBN 978-0-811-73562-9.
