= Red Wemette =

- Born: William Wemette
- Other names: Red from Chicago
- Known for: FBI informant, author

William "Red" Wemette is known as an FBI informant who testified against organized crime figures in the Chicago, Illinois, area. Wemette stated in court that he had been an informant from 1971 to 1989.

He is the author the 2016 release book entitled Nobody Cares and What I Did About It! The Red Wemette Story of the Chicago Outfit.

Wemette and his partner operated a pornography shop in Chicago. They paid the "street tax" exacted from them by a group of criminals. Wemette made arrangements with the FBI to have his discussions with the mobsters recorded.

He met with FBI agents in 1971 at the Lion House in the Lincoln Park Zoo and agreed to become an informant for them in exchange for their payments to him for the information he would provide them on Mob activity and figures. Wemette had video cameras concealed in his apartment that captured his regular meetings with organized crime figures.

Wemette has been a key witness in a number of federal trials of mobsters and other Chicago area crime figures and has associated with many organized crime law enforcement officers including John J. Flood. He provided details that led to the conviction of Frank Schweihs, the 1995 trial of Kenneth Hansen for the 1955 Peterson-Schuessler triple homicide, and most recently in Operation Family Secrets that helped close several chapters of Chicago Mafia activity and history.
