= Jack Williams (footballer, born 1907) =

Australian rules footballer, born 1907

Personal information
- Full name: Jack Williams
- Born: 22 October 1907
- Died: 11 July 1987 (aged 79)
- Original team: Mortlake

Playing career^{1}
Years	Club	Games (Goals)
1930	Fitzroy	4 (4)
- ^{1} Playing statistics correct to the end of 1930.

Jack Williams (22 October 1907 – 11 July 1987) was an Australian rules footballer who played with Fitzroy in the Victorian Football League (VFL).
