= Michel Paccard (ice hockey) =

French ice hockey player

- Born: 1 November 1908; Chamonix, France
- Died: 4 July 1987 (aged 78); La Tronche, France
- Position: Goaltender
- National team: France

Michel Paccard (1 November 1908 – 4 July 1987) was a French ice hockey player. He competed in the men's tournament at the 1936 Winter Olympics.
