= Vasilyevo, Velikoustyugsky District, Vologda Oblast =

Vasilyevo Васильево
- Village
- Location within Vologda Oblast Location within Russia
- Coordinates: 60°27′N 46°45′E
- Country: Russia
- Region: Vologda Oblast
- District: Velikoustyugsky District
- Time zone: UTC+3:00

Vasilyevo (Russian: Васильево) is a rural locality (a village) in Teplogorskoye Rural Settlement, Velikoustyugsky District, Vologda Oblast, Russia. The population was 19 as of 2002.

== Geography ==
Vasilyevo is located 71 km southeast of Veliky Ustyug (the district's administrative centre) by road. Slizovitsa is the nearest rural locality.
