= Tracy Read =

Tracy Glenn Read (December 23, 1961 – July 25, 1987) was a campaigner on the Automobile Racing Club of America tour. His first race was on October 31, 1981, at Milwaukee. He also worked on Cale Yarborough's NASCAR team and for a few ARCA races in 1987 Read ran Yarborough's backup Winston Cup race car.

In the spring race at Talladega in 1987, Read was swept up in a massive pileup late in the race, but was uninjured. However, on his next race back at Talladega in July, on the 78th lap of the 117 lap (500 km race), Kirk Bryant spun and hit the outside wall. Read, who was behind Bryant's whirling Oldsmobile, spun through the infield grass to avoid him, but Read's car plowed nearly head on into the inside dirt bank. Read, 25, died instantly of massive head, chest, and abdominal injuries from the crash.

Read was noted for his very close physical resemblance to Davey Allison, and may be best remembered for his actions following the big crash in the first Talladega race of 1987 when he climbed from his car and began waving frantically for safety crews to extinguish the flames from his burning car.

Following his death, Cale Yarborough said of Read, "Tracy was a nice young man who would do anything to help someone in need, he can never be replaced by anyone else and I'll miss him a lot..."
