= Brach's =

Brand of confectionery

- Product type: Confectionery
- Current owner: Ferrara Candy Company
- Introduced: 1904; 122 years ago
- Markets: United States
- Tagline: Break Out the Brach's
- Website: www.brachs.com

Brach's (/ˈbrɑːks/) is a candy and sweets brand of Ferrara Candy Company.

== History ==
In 1904, Emil J. Brach invested his $1,000 life savings in a storefront candy store located at the corner of North Avenue and Towne Street in Chicago, Illinois. He named it "Brach's Palace of Sweets". With his sons Edwin and Frank, he started with one kettle. Investing in additional equipment he was able to lower his production costs and sell his candy for 20 cents per pound, well below the more typical 50 cents per pound his competitors were charging. By 1911, his production had reached 50,000 pounds per week.

By 1923, Brach had four factories operating at capacity. He then invested $5 million in a new factory, beginning construction in 1921. Built at 4656 West Kinzie Street, it consolidated production into one building. At the time, the company was producing 127 varieties of candy and had a capacity of 2,225,000 pounds per year. Over the years, the Kinzie plant was expanded, and investments in new processes and equipment were made, including a chocolate grinding plant and a large panning operation. In 1948, an electrical spark ignited corn starch, causing a massive explosion on the plant's third floor that killed 11 employees and injured 18. Much of the factory's north side was destroyed. Reconstruction brought the plant's capacity up to more than 4 million pounds of product per year, and it employed 2,400 workers, in 2,200,000 square feet (200,000 m^{2}). It was recognized as the largest candy-manufacturing plant in the world at the time. At its peak, 4,500 employees worked there. The plant was abandoned in 2003 when new owners took over operations, and production was moved primarily to Mexico. In August 2007, an administrative building was blown up for the filming of The Dark Knight, with the rest of the complex being demolished in 2014 and currently remaining as parking space.

Prior to World War II, Brach's produced several candy bars, including a chocolate-covered, honeycombed, peanut butter Swing Bar as well as a mint and almond nougat bar. After the war, Brach's concentrated on bulk and bagged candies as Halloween Trick or treating became a popular activity. Brach's promoted its candy corn and other fall-themed candies, available in single-serve, pre-packaged packets.

In 1958, Brach's introduced the Pick-A-Mix concept. Customers could choose from a wide selection of items in bulk containers, scooping their choices, and paying one price per pound. This was adapted from the barrels seen in general stores at the time. Pick-A-Mix brought the dying traditional method of buying candy at the local corner or general store into the era of the modern supermarket.

In 1966, American Home Products Corporation purchased the company. In 1986, the last year of ownership by American Home Products, it accounted for two-thirds of the U.S. market for bagged candy and 7% of the $9 billion U.S. candy market. It employed 3,700 and had an estimated pretax profit of more than $75 million on sales of $640 million.

In 1987, Klaus Jacobs purchased the company for $730 million, and by the end of 1989, it was in serious trouble. Losses that year were an estimated $50 million and sales had decreased to $470 million. By 1993, sales had dropped to $400 million though losses were reduced somewhat to $26 million. All this occurred during a period when overall per capita candy consumption in the U.S. had increased 25%. By May, 1994, Brach's moved its headquarters from the plant property to a penthouse office in one of Chicago's wealthiest suburbs, saw a loss of nearly 900 jobs (42% of the workforce at that time), and suffered a loss of key customers and market share.

Jacobs almost immediately fired Brach's top officers and gutted the leadership of its sales, marketing, production, and finance departments. Some of these positions were filled with executives from Suchard's European operations — people with little experience in the candy industry. Former executives cited Jacobs's autocratic management style at Suchard and his inability to recognize the difference between American and European candy consumption habits. The name of the company was changed to Jacobs Suchard Inc., a name few retailers or consumers recognized, and product lines were trimmed from 1,700 to 400 in an attempt to cut costs. This alienated many of its largest customers, including Walgreens and Walmart, who found other sources, including Farley Candy. In addition to the cuts in product selection, Brach's also curtailed holiday promotional activities.

In 1990, Phillip Morris purchased Jacobs Suchard for $3.8 billion, except for its U.S. subsidiary. A holding company named Van Houten & Zoon Holding AG was formed by Klaus Jacobs to run Brach's and other businesses. Disagreements with Klaus Jacobs on marketing and management strategies continued, particularly over commodity vs. branded (Brach's) products. In 1993 alone, Brach's saw three different CEO's, and continued to experience a high rate of turnover and dismissals within the sales and marketing departments. Many of Brach's sales personnel left to work for its competitors.

In September 1994, Jacobs purchased the Brock Candy Company of Chattanooga for $140 million, a year in which Brock Candy had sales of $112 million and profits of $6.5 million. This was the second attempt by the two companies to join. The first time had been while E. J. Brach's was under American Home Products ownership. The merger attempt at that time was abandoned because of concerns of an antitrust suit.

For a time the new company operated as the Brach and Brock Candy Company, later changed to Brach's Confections.

In 2003, Barry Callebaut AG purchased the new company. The principal owner of Brach's, KJ Jacobs AG, was also a majority stakeholder in Barry Callebaut. As part of the deal, Barry Callebaut agreed to assume $16 million in debt, fund restructuring efforts for five years and paid a symbolic $1.00 for the company.

In 2007, the company was sold to the Farley's & Sathers Candy Company, which in turn merged with the Ferrara Pan Candy Company in 2012 to form the Ferrara Candy Company.

== Products ==
The company's first product was caramels, which it produced through a process that allowed it to underprice competition, creating a large demand. This product is still a company mainstay to the present day, along with a large variety of other products, including a line of everyday products and special seasonal offerings.

=== Candy corn ===
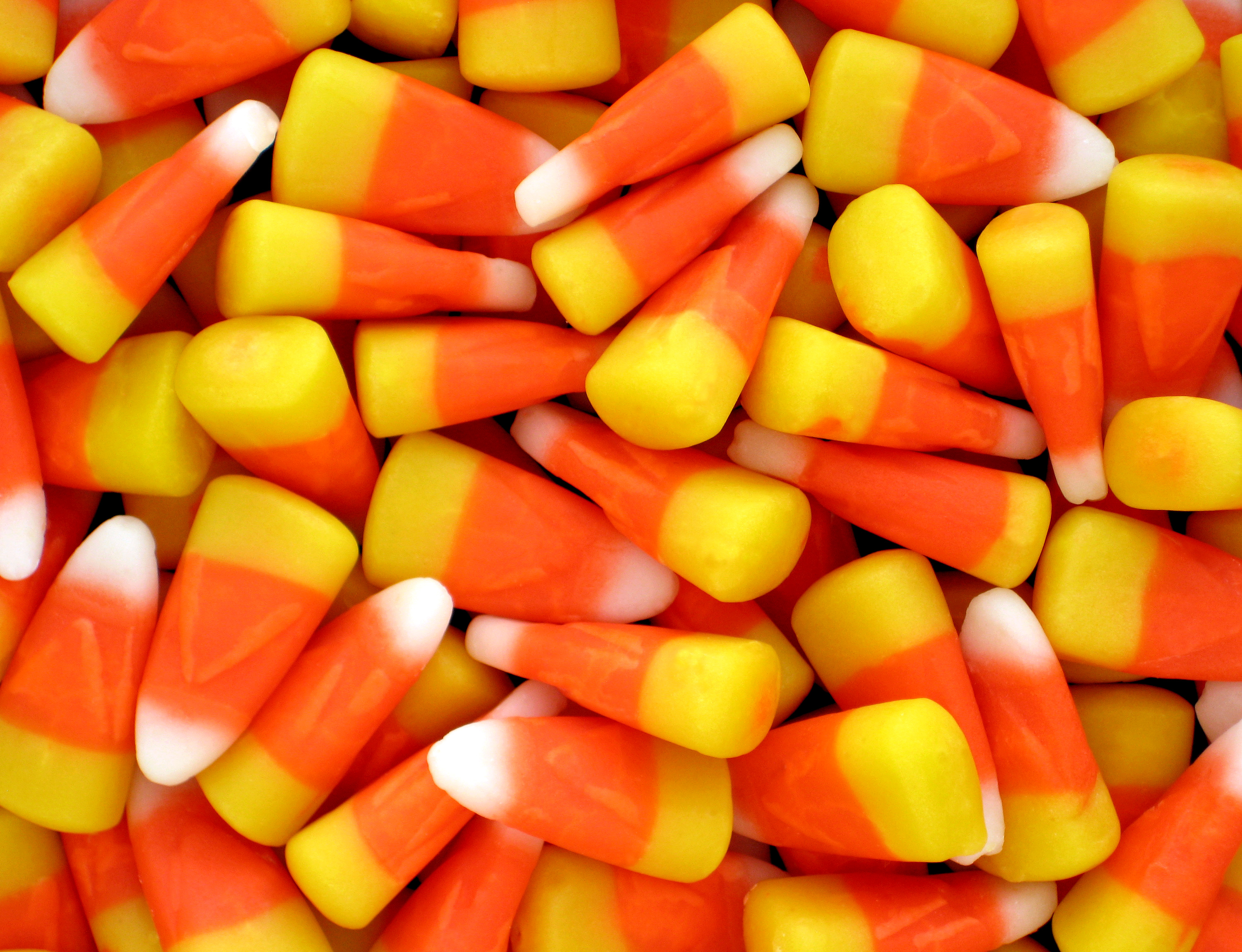
Brach's candy corn

Brach's produces candy corn. Though primarily associated with Halloween, it can also be bought year-round, though it is subject to seasonal availability. It is available in flavors such as pumpkin spice, s'mores and caramel.

=== Conversation Hearts ===
Brach's Sweethearts are small heart-shaped sugar candies sold around Valentine's Day. Each conversation heart is printed with a message such as "Be Mine," "Kiss Me", "Call Me", or "Miss You". They are now being made in a number of sizes and themes including Emoticon and Alphabet hearts.

=== Nougats ===
Brach's chewy sweet nougats are available seasonally in different flavors. The flavors vary from year to year, but in recent years there have been peppermint, wintergreen, and cinnamon for the Christmas season; candy corn-flavored for Halloween, and ice cream-flavored for Easter.

=== Jelly Beans ===
Brach's Original Jelly Beans are an Easter season mainstay. In addition to the original mix, they are available in spiced, speckled, orchard fruit and sour flavors. For the 2015 Easter season, they also released tiny- and jumbo-sized versions of the classic flavor mix.

=== Chocolates ===
In addition to seasonal products, Brach's sells chocolates, including Malt Balls, Double Dipped Peanuts, Chocolate Stars, Almond Supremes, and Bridge Mix. For Easter, the Malt Balls are egg-shaped and covered in a speckled candy shell, in either a white, or pastel mix and are called Fiesta Malted Milk Eggs.

=== Other candies ===
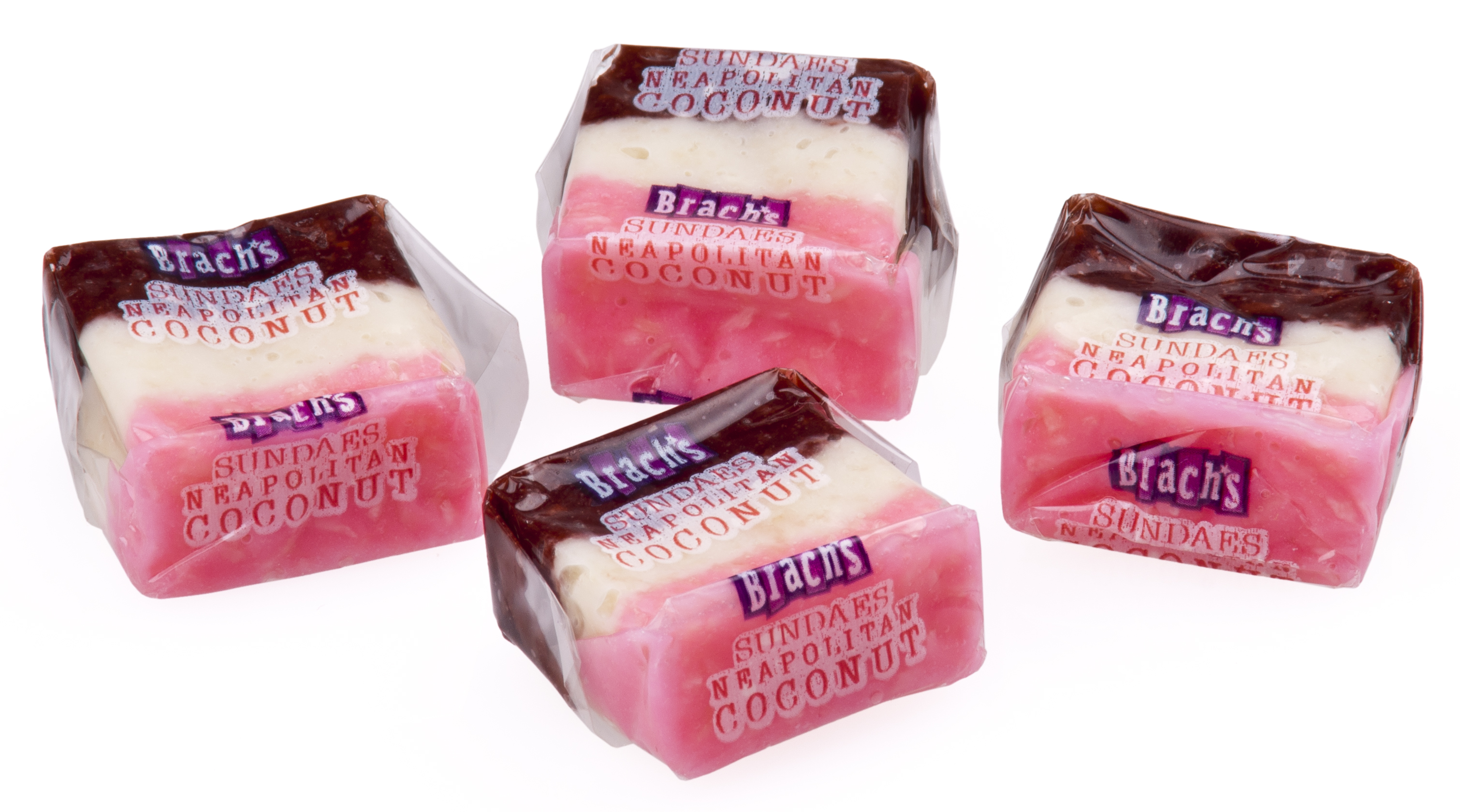
Brach's Sundaes Neapolitan Coconut, out of production since 2012

Brach's also makes year-round candies, including Star Brite Mints, Caramel Royals, Lemon Drops, Spice Drops, and Maple Nut Goodies.

== See also ==
- Helen Brach
