= Vasilyevo, Vashkinsky District, Vologda Oblast =

Vasilyevo Васильево
- Village
- Location within Vologda Oblast Location within Russia
- Coordinates: 60°21′N 37°44′E
- Country: Russia
- Region: Vologda Oblast
- District: Vashkinsky District
- Time zone: UTC+3:00

Vasilyevo (Russian: Васильево) is a rural locality (a village) in Kisnemskoye Rural Settlement, Vashkinsky District, Vologda Oblast, Russia. The population was 1 as of 2002.

== Geography ==
Vasilyevo is located 20 km northwest of Lipin Bor (the district's administrative centre) by road. Pozdino is the nearest rural locality.
