= Mohamed Abou Habaga =

Egyptian footballer (1921-1987)

Personal information
- Nationality: Egyptian
- Born: 21 May 1921 Cairo, Egypt
- Died: 1 July 1987 (aged 66) Cairo, Egypt

Sport
- Sport: Football
- Club: Al Ahly SC; Al Masry SC, El Sekka El Hadid SC

Mohamed Tawfiq Abou Habaga (21 May 1921 – 1 July 1987) was an Egyptian footballer who played as a midfielder. He competed in the 1948 Summer Olympics.
