= Carlton Fredericks =

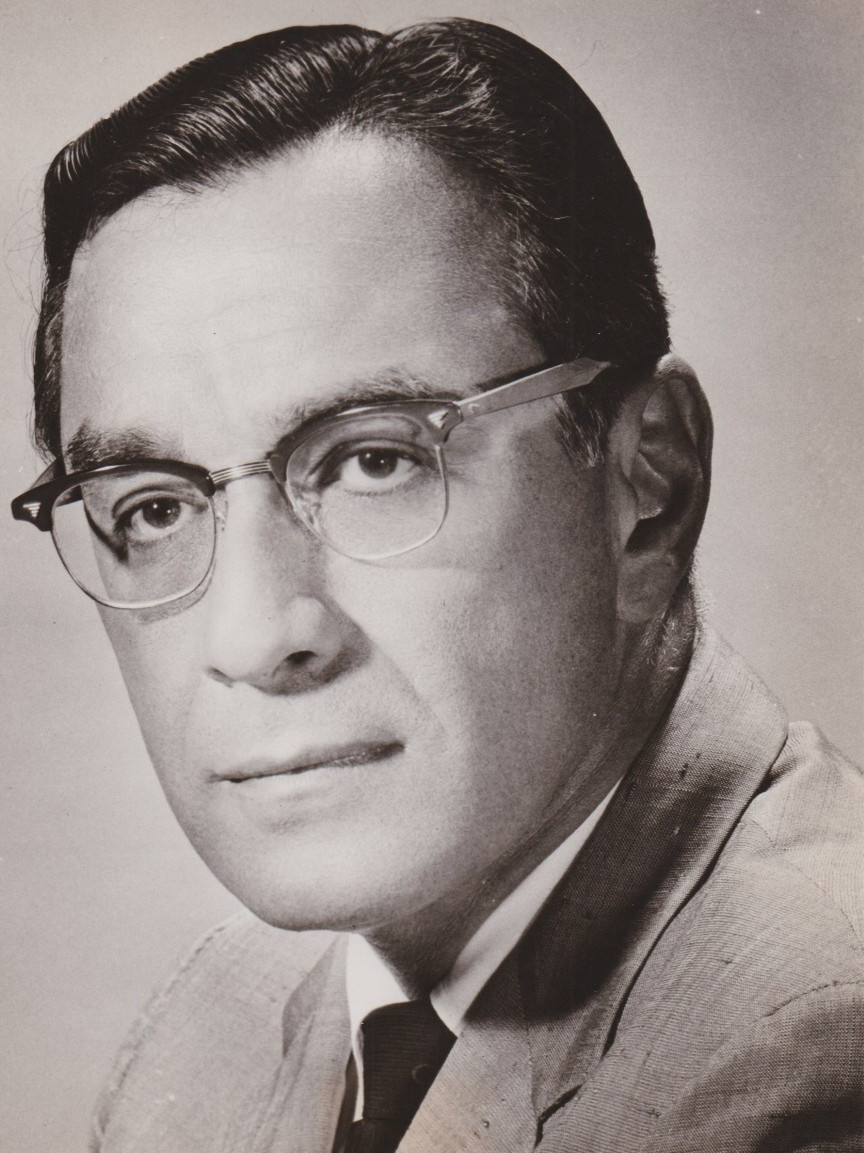
- Fredericks in 1962
- Born: Harold Frederick Caplan; October 23, 1910; Brooklyn, New York City, U.S.
- Died: July 28, 1987 (aged 76)
- Citizenship: American
- Education: University of Alabama, New York University
- Occupations: Radio commentator, writer, lecturer
- Employer(s): WMGM, WOR (AM)
- Known for: Design for Living radio program; writings on nutrition
- Notable work: Eat, Live and Be Merry (1951), Food Facts and Fallacies (1968), Nutrition: Your Key to Good Health (1973), Eat Well, Get Well, Stay Well (1980)

Carlton Fredericks, born Harold Frederick Caplan, (October 23, 1910 – July 28, 1987) was an American radio commentator and writer on health and nutrition.

== Early life and education ==
Fredericks was born in Brooklyn, New York, and graduated from the University of Alabama in 1931 with a major in English and a minor in political science. He would later enroll in New York University's School of Education and receive a master's degree in 1949, and a night-school Ph.D. in communications in 1955. His dissertation was "A Study of the Responses of a Group of Adult Female Listeners to a Series of Educational Radio Programs."

== Career ==
In 1937, Fredericks obtained a job writing advertising copy and giving sales talks for the U.S. Vitamin Corporation. In this capacity, he began diagnosing and prescribing vitamins to patients. Caught in a sting operation conducted by agents from the New York State Department of Education, he pleaded guilty to unlawful practice of medicine in the Special Sessions Court of New York City on March 13, 1945, and paid a $500 fine, receiving a suspended sentence of 3 months in prison. He was a radio host at WMGM in New York City, and starting in 1957 moved to WOR-AM, where he stayed for 30 years until his death.

His WOR-AM nutrition advice call-in program, Design for Living, was broadcast six days a week by the station and was also syndicated. Fredericks also wrote several books on nutrition as well as writing a column for Prevention magazine. He was a heavy smoker and died of a heart attack in 1987 at the age of 76.

Fredericks was a friend of Robert Atkins and they remained in close contact. Atkins considered Fredericks one of his mentors.

== Reception ==
Fredericks' ideas about nutrition have been described as "nonsense" and "quackery". In 1978 it was noted that "Fredericks frequently threatens to take libel action against those who disagree with him. So assiduous has he been in this respect that he even writes threatening letters to physicians who have questioned his ideas in private correspondence."

Biographer Lisa Rogak notes that Fredericks "quickly developed a reputation as a quack or worse, discredited by traditional medical practitioners and the AMA." He was criticized for spreading misinformation about hypoglycemia. For example, he stated that millions of people were suffering from reactive hypoglycemia but according to the American Diabetes Association and other medical health experts the condition is uncommon. Science writer Kurt Butler has written that Fredericks "recommended injects of adrenal cortical extract on the theory that the gland is weakened in hypoglycemia and needs a boost. Fredericks thus compounded nonsense with dangerous nonsense."

Nutritionist Fredrick J. Stare commented that the "acceptance and application of Frederick's erroneous interpretation of research findings as applied to human health could result in tragedy."

== Selected publications ==
- Eat, Live and be Merry (1951)
- Dr. Carlton Fredericks' Low Carbohydrate Diet (1965)
- Food Facts and Fallacies (1968) [with Herbert Bailey]
- Nutrition: Your Key to Good Health (1973)
- Carlton Fredericks Cook Book for Good Nutrition (1974)
- Carlton Fredericks' High-Fiber Way to Total Health (1976)
- Breast Cancer: A Nutritional Approach (1979)
- Psychonutrition: Diet, Vitamin and Mineral Way to Emotional Health (1979)
- Eat Well, Get Well, Stay Well (1980)
- Carlton Fredericks' Program for Living Longer (1983)
- Carlton Fredericks' New Low Blood Sugar and You (1985)
- Look Younger, Feel Healthier (1985)
- Low Blood Sugar You (1987)
- Carlton Fredericks' Guide to Women's Nutrition (1988)
