= Vasilyevo, Republic of Bashkortostan =

Vasilyevo Васильево
- Village
- Location within Bashkortostan Location within Russia
- Coordinates: 56°03′N 54°42′E
- Country: Russia
- Region: Bashkortostan
- District: Kaltasinsky District
- Time zone: UTC+5:00

Vasilyevo (Russian: Васильево) is a rural locality (a village) in Tyuldinsky Selsoviet, Kaltasinsky District, Bashkortostan, Russia. The population was 31 as of 2010. There is 1 street.

== Geography ==
Vasilyevo is located 21 km northwest of Kaltasy (the district's administrative centre) by road. Sredny Kachmash is the nearest rural locality.
