= Tanya Zolotoroff Nash =

Ukrainian-American Jewish Deaf rights activist (1898–1987)

- Born: Tanya Zolotoroff; 10 May 1898; Odessa, Russian Empire
- Died: 10 July 1987 (aged 89)
- Occupations: Executive Director of New York Society for the Deaf, Advocate
- Known for: Deaf Rights Activism

Tanya Zolotoroff Nash (10 May 1898 – 10 July 1987) was a Russian-American Deaf Rights activist who, after emigrating to the United States in 1904 from Ukraine, dedicated 35 years of her life advocating for, teaching, and creating safe spaces for the American Jewish Deaf and elderly deaf community. She held leadership in the Society for the Welfare of the Jewish Deaf as well as pushed for the creation of the New York State Mental Health Services for the Deaf (1955).

== Biography ==
Nash was born in Odessa, Russian Empire (now Ukraine) on 10 May 1898, to an upper-middle class Jewish family. Her father manufactured expensive fur hats, which allowed them to have servants and frequent socialist guests. In 1904, because their country was on the brink of war with Japan, her father decided that their family would move to the United States to avoid potentially being drafted into the army. After moving to Brooklyn, New York, the family was stricken with poverty and was never able to gain the wealth or status they had in Ukraine. Nash's mother was said to have always had a positive and determined attitude for her five children, especially in the eyes of Nash. Nash always looked up to her mother; Nash's hardworking spirit that transferred to her work later in life is most likely a reflection of her mother's can-do personality.

Nash was an excellent student, despite her low-class status. She was eager to learn English, taking night-classes despite being underage and constantly immersing herself in the English language. At just thirteen, she won a spelling bee but could not attend because she did not have functioning shoes. At age fifteen, she was forced to drop out of school and work to support her family. Despite that, she was offered an honorary degree from Columbia University. She humbly declined the offer because she felt it was not fair due to the insufficient amount of schooling she had completed.

She was married to Rabbi A. Felix Nash (c. 1903–1932).

In the late 1920s, her husband became the director of the New York Society for the Deaf. Nash learned sign language and helped provide interpreter services. She was an acquaintance of Helen Keller.

Nash worked as an interpreter for deaf people in state mental hospitals and psychiatrists' offices, as well as in court houses, including citizenship exams. When her husband died in 1932, she took over the agency, furthering several initiatives.

Her legacy is upheld in New York's Tanya Towers Community Residence, which stands and operates in her honor as a residence building for the elderly deaf community. This was her final project before her retirement in 1968.
