= Vasilyevo, Kirillovsky District, Vologda Oblast =

Vasilyevo Василево
- Village
- Location within Vologda Oblast Location within Russia
- Coordinates: 59°54′N 38°54′E
- Country: Russia
- Region: Vologda Oblast
- District: Kirillovsky District
- Time zone: UTC+3:00

Vasilyevo (Russian: Василево) is a rural locality (a village) in Nikolotorzhskoye Rural Settlement, Kirillovsky District, Vologda Oblast, Russia. The population was 2 as of 2002.

== Geography ==
Vasilyevo is located 39 km northeast of Kirillov (the district's administrative centre) by road. Klemushino is the nearest rural locality.
