= Vasilyevo, Vladimir Oblast =

Vasilyevo Васильево
- Village
- Location within Vladimir Oblast Location within Russia
- Coordinates: 56°02′N 41°09′E
- Country: Russia
- Region: Vladimir Oblast
- District: Sudogodsky District
- Time zone: UTC+3:00

Vasilyevo (Russian: Васильево) is a rural locality (a village) in Andreyevskoye Rural Settlement, Sudogodsky District, Vladimir Oblast, Russia. The population was 6 as of 2010.

== Geography ==
Vasilyevo is located 38 km northeast of Sudogda (the district's administrative centre) by road. Kartamazovo is the nearest rural locality.
