= Henry Kroger =

Australian cricketer

Personal information
- Born: 27 June 1906; Melbourne, Australia
- Died: 16 July 1987 (aged 81); Melbourne, Australia

Domestic team information
- Years: Team
- 1935-1936: Victoria
- Source: Cricinfo, 22 November 2015

Henry Kroger (27 June 1906 – 16 July 1987) was an Australian cricketer. He played two first-class cricket matches for Victoria between 1935 and 1936.

== See also ==
- List of Victoria first-class cricketers
