= John Fitzgerald (Australian footballer, born 1901) =

Australian rules footballer, born 1901

Personal information
- Full name: John Francis Joseph Fitzgerald
- Born: 25 June 1901; Brunswick, Victoria
- Died: 12 July 1987 (aged 86); Northcote, Victoria
- Original team: Brunswick
- Height: 160 cm (5 ft 3 in)
- Weight: 58 kg (128 lb)

Playing career^{1}
Years	Club	Games (Goals)
1922–26	Brunswick (VFA)	
1926	Fitzroy	3 (0)
1929–32	Brunswick (VFA)	
- ^{1} Playing statistics correct to the end of 1932.

John Francis Joseph Fitzgerald (25 June 1901 – 12 July 1987), also known as "Frank Fitzgerald", was an Australian rules footballer who played with Fitzroy in the Victorian Football League (VFL) and Brunswick in the Victorian Football Association (VFA).

He later served in the Australian Army in New Guinea during World War II.

== Death ==
He died at Northcote, Victoria on 12 July 1987.
