= Vasilyevsky =

Vasilyevsky (masculine), Vasilyevskaya (feminine), or Vasilyevskoye (neuter) may refer to:

- Vasilyevsky Municipal Okrug, a municipal okrug of Vasileostrovsky District of the federal city of St. Petersburg, Russia
- Vasilyevsky Island, an island in St. Petersburg, Russia
- Vasilyevsky (rural locality) (Vasilyevskaya, Vasilyevskoye), name of several rural localities in Russia
- Vasilyevsky District, name of Chkalovsky District of Nizhny Novgorod Oblast, Russia, in 1936–1937
