= Juraj Lupták =

Slovak serial killer and rapist

- Born: 2 January 1942; Banská Bystrica, Slovakia
- Died: 16 July 1987 (aged 45); Bratislava, Czechoslovak Socialist Republic
- Cause of death: Execution by hanging
- Other name: "The Strangler from Banská Bystrica"
- Conviction: Murder
- Penalty: Death

Details
- Victims: 3
- Span of crimes: 1978–1982
- Country: Slovakia

Juraj Lupták (2 January 1942 – 16 July 1987) was a Slovak rapist and serial killer, called The Strangler from Banská Bystrica. From May 1978 to July 1982, he raped and murdered three young women.

== Youth and first crimes ==
Lupták was brought up in an orphanage, and from an early age liked to spend time in the mountains. As a young man, he graduated from a mining school but never worked in this profession. When he was 17, he fell into alcoholism; from that moment he had many problems with the law, and he was punished for theft and lewd deeds. When he was 36 years old and working as a shepherd, he noticed 20-year-old Elena Abrahámová in the area of a meadow where he was grazing sheep. Lupták hit her head with a stone, raped her, and then strangled her. The murder took place on 6 May 1978, and the victim's body, which he hid in thick bushes, was found only a year later - in April 1979. Shortly after the murder, Lupták was arrested for tax crimes and imprisoned for several years.

== 1982 Crimes ==
In 1982, Lupták was released from prison. On 2 June, while in the forest, he noticed 15-year-old Lýdia Reinvartová returning from school. He raped and subsequently strangled her, burying her in a shallow grave. During the autopsy, it was revealed that Rydlová had been buried alive, as was demonstrated by the clumps of earth found in her lungs. Lupták would later claim that he was sure that the victim was dead when buried. At the location of the killing, Lupták lost the spade he had used to bury the victim. When leaving the crime scene, he was noticed by passers-by, who later recognized him. The girl's decomposing body was found a month later.

Just a few days after the discovery of the second victim, on 18 July, Lupták attacked another 15-year-old, Ivana Trnková, this time in the centre of Banská Bystrica. He hit the girl with a stone on the head, and while she was unconscious, he ripped off her clothes. However, he did not rape her because she was menstruating. When the girl regained consciousness, she begged him to spare her life, but Lupták, enraged by the circumstances, beat and then strangled her. The murder took place in the evening in the yard of the National Regional Committee building.

Two sexual murders, in a very short space of time, caused mass panic in Banská Bystrica. Women were afraid to go out alone on the street, and were often in the company of relatives. A search for the murderer began in the city. Seeing this, Lupták stayed in the mountains for the following days, where he felt safe. Exhausted from hiding, he decided to break into a house and was arrested by the militia for the break-in. He was recognized at the police station from the facial composite drawn after the second murder. Lupták pleaded guilty, including to the 1978 murder. During psychiatric examinations, he was diagnosed with an antisocial personality disorder and a sexual disorder. He was sentenced to death for his crimes and was hanged on 16 July 1987, in Bratislava.

== Victims ==
Lp.	Victim	Age	Date of murder
1.	Elena Adamová	20	6 May 1978
2.	Lýdia Rydlová	15	2 June 1982
3.	Ivana Turová	15	18 July 1982

== See also ==
- List of serial killers by country
