= Edward Nesfield =

English cricketer

Personal information
- Full name: Edward Roy Nesfield
- Born: 7 March 1900; Armthorpe, Yorkshire, England
- Died: 1 July 1987 (aged 87); Bridgetown, Somerset, England
- Batting: Right-handed
- Bowling: Right-arm off-break

Career statistics
Competition	FC
Matches	3
Runs scored	27
Batting average	6.75
100s/50s	0/0
Top score	16
Balls bowled	18
Wickets	0
Bowling average	-
5 wickets in innings	0
10 wickets in match	0
Best bowling	-
Catches/stumpings	0/0
- Source: CricketArchive, 5 May 2009

Edward Roy Nesfield (7 March 1900 – 1 July 1987), educated at King's School, Worcester, was an English cricketer who played three first-class matches for Worcestershire just after the First World War. Two of these games were friendlies in 1919 against HK Foster's XI, while the other – Nesfield's only County Championship outing – came the following year. His highest score of 16 was made in his debut innings.
