= Vasilyevo, Zelenodolsky District, Republic of Tatarstan =

Vasilyevo Васильево
- Urban-type settlement

Other transcription(s)
  - Tatar: Васил
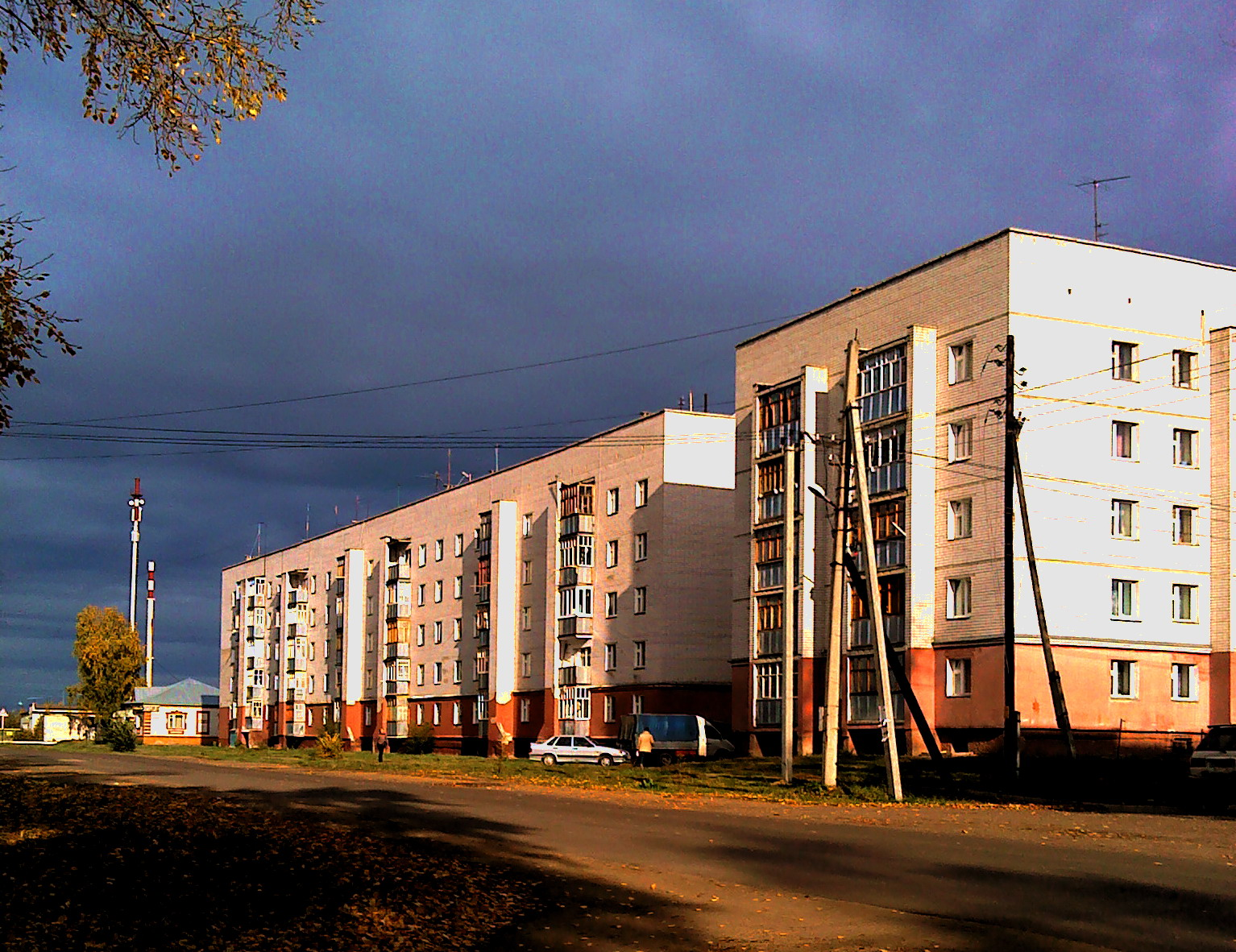
- Oktyabrskaya Street in Vasilyevo

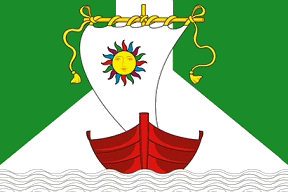
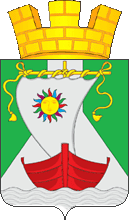
- Flag Coat of arms
- Interactive map of Vasilyevo
- Location of Vasilyevo Vasilyevo (Tatarstan)
- Coordinates: 55°50′N 48°45′E
- Country: Russia
- Federal subject: Tatarstan
- Administrative district: Zelenodolsky District
- Founded: 17th century
- Urban-type settlement status since: 1928

Population (2010 Census)
  - Total: 16,953
  - Estimate (2021): 17,286 (+2%)

Municipal status
  - Municipal district: Zelenodolsky Municipal District
  - Urban settlement: Vasilyevo Urban Settlement
  - Capital of: Vasilyevo Urban Settlement
- Time zone: UTC+3 (MSK)
- Postal code: 422530
- Dialing code: +7 84371
- OKTMO ID: 92628155051

Vasilyevo (Russian: Васи́льево; Tatar: Васил) is an urban locality (an urban-type settlement) in Zelenodolsky District of the Republic of Tatarstan, Russia, located on the left bank of the Volga River (Kuybyshev Reservoir), 19 kilometers (12 mi) east of Zelenodolsk, the administrative center of the district. As of the 2010 Census, its population was 16,953.

== History ==
It was established in the 17th century and was granted urban-type settlement status in 1928.

== Administrative and municipal status ==
Within the framework of administrative divisions, the urban-type settlement of Vasilyevo is subordinated to Zelenodolsky District. As a municipal division, Vasilyevo is incorporated within Zelenodolsky Municipal District as Vasilyevo Urban Settlement.

== Economy and infrastructure ==
As of 1997, the major industrial enterprises in the settlement were a laboratory glassware and tools plant, a bakery, as well as various construction and timber factories. The settlement serves as a railway station on the Kazan–Kanash line.

== Demographics ==
Vasilyevo population
- 2010 Census: 16,953
- 2002 Census: 16,846
- 1989 Census: 18,776
- 1979 Census: 19,638

In 1989, the population was ethnically mostly Russian (69.0%), followed by Tatars (26.3%) and Chuvash (1.8%).
