= Buccieri =

Buccieri, Bucchieri or Bucceri is a surname. Notable people with the surname include:

- Fiore Buccieri (1907–1973), American mobster
- Frank Buccieri (1919–2004), American mobster
- Giovanni Bucchieri, Swedish choreographer
