= Rockford crime family =

Rockford branch of the American Mafia

- Founded: c. 1920; 106 years ago
- Founder: Antonio Musso
- Named after: Joseph Zammuto
- Founding location: Rockford, Illinois, United States
- Years active: c. 1920–2005
- Territory: Primarily the Rockford metropolitan area, with additional territory throughout Northern Illinois
- Ethnicity: Italians as "made men" and other ethnicities as associates
- Activities: Racketeering, gambling, bookmaking, loan sharking, extortion, armed robbery, bribery, assault, and murder
- Allies: Bonanno crime family; Chicago Outfit; Milwaukee crime family; Springfield crime family
- Rivals: Various gangs in the Rockford area

The Rockford crime family, also known as the Zammuto crime family or the Rockford Mafia, was an Italian American Mafia crime family based in Rockford, Illinois. In 1960, the Federal Bureau of Investigation (FBI) confirmed that the Rockford family had remained an independent crime family, even though they were within close distance to the powerful Chicago Outfit.

== History ==
The earliest known Mafia boss in Rockford was Antonio Musso, who established his group during the Prohibition era. Musso would step down as boss in 1957, due to ill health and was replaced by Joseph Zammuto.

When Joseph Zammuto took over as boss, the Rockford family consisted of fourteen "made" members. Born in Aragona, Sicily, in April 1896, Zammuto emigrated to Rockford with his family in 1913. As a young man Zammuto joined Musso's Mafia group and rose to power through prohibition running an illegal bootlegging operation. During his time in Rockford, Zammuto amassed significant wealth as a mobster and, in 1954, he purchased the Dr. Pepper bottling plant in the city. In 1957, New York State Police suspected that Zammuto attended the notorious Apalachin meeting after they discovered his hotel reservation. During the late 1950s, many associates of the Chicago Outfit began relocating to Rockford to join Zammuto's Mafia family.

In October 1960, the Federal Bureau of Investigation (FBI) wiretapped a conversation between Chicago Outfit underboss Frank Ferraro and Jackie Cerone. The wiretap revealed that Cerone received a phone call from Rockford boss Zammuto, who wanted to setup a meeting. Cerone immediately called Outfit boss Sam Giancana, but was unable to reach him and spoke with Ferraro instead. It was concluded by the FBI that Ferraro did not know the boss of the Rockford family, confirming that there was little connection between the two crime families.

By 1961, Zammuto's administration included the new underboss Frank Buscemi, and his longtime and loyal consigliere Joseph Zito. The relationship between Zammuto and Frank Buscemi grew stronger after Zammuto's son married Buscemi's sister. Zammuto's consigliere Joseph Zito was a brother to the Springfield Mafia boss Frank Zito. Zito had arrived in America during Prohibition along with his brother-in-law Jasper Calo, and his brothers settling in Springfield before moving he relocated to Rockford. The FBI spent many years investigating Joseph Zito as he traveled between Rockford, Springfield, Milwaukee, New York, California, and Italy.

As boss Zammuto maintained close ties and friendships with Chicago Outfit boss Joseph Aiuppa and Milwaukee family boss Frank Balistrieri. By 1974, Joseph Zammuto stepped down as boss, and was replaced by his closet alley Frank Buscemi. Zammuto continued to serve as a family adviser, while traveling between his homes in Rockford and Hollywood, Florida.

As the new boss Frank Buscemi continued controlling many illegal rackets in the Rockford area. Buscemi had started his criminal career in Chicago before moving in 1959, to Rockford, which caused some distrust amongst the senior members of the family. Buscemi was able to overcome this distrust in the family through his ties to Joseph Zito and Jasper Calo, who were both longtime members of the Rockford family. He rose to power becoming underboss of the family and threw controlled a vending machine business in the basement of the Aragona Club. In 1980, retired boss Joseph Zammuto's son passed away and mobsters from all over Chicago, Springfield and Milwaukee attended the funeral. Over the years Buscemi continued to grow in power by expanding into many legal businesses. In 1981, longtime consigliere Joseph Zito died of natural causes. On December 7, 1987, boss Buscemi died of natural causes.

Longtime member Charles Vince became the family's new boss, after Buscemi's death. Vince had risen to power during the 1950s, by controlling the family's illegal gambling rackets. He also kept close ties and friendship with Bonanno family capo Anthony "Tony" Riela, from New Jersey. In 1981, the FBI revealed that Vince had become Rockford's underboss and had been working with Milwaukee family boss Frank Balistrieri in a number of illegal rackets. On May 18, 1990, retired boss Joseph Zammuto died of natural causes. Vince continued to rule as Rockford's boss until January 24, 1994, when he died of natural causes.

After Vince's death, Sebastian Gulotta took over the family becoming boss. Gulotta was a longtime member of the Rockford family having been inducted into the family during Zammuto's reign. During his time in the family Gulotta became power mobster controlling a number of illegal rackets. Gulotta maintained close friendships with Zammuto and Milwaukee boss Frank Balistrieri. On March 15, 2000, Gulotta died of natural causes.

With the support of the Chicago Outfit longtime Rockford member Frank "Gumba" Saladino became the boss. In the 1970s, Saladino associated himself with the Chicago Outfit's South Side/26th Street crew in committing many contract murders for the Chicago Outfit. On April 25, 2005, the U.S. Department of Justice launched Operation Family Secrets which indicted Frank Saladino alongside thirteen Chicago Outfit members and associates under the RICO Act, including Joseph Lombardo, Nicholas Calabrese, Frank Calabrese Sr. and James Marcello. During the indictment arrests, Frank Saladino was discovered dead of natural causes in a hotel in Hampshire, Illinois, where he was living, with nearly $100,000 in cash and checks.

== Historical leadership ==
=== Boss (official and acting) ===
- 1920s–1957 – Antonio "Tony" Musso – stepped down from health issues
  - Acting 1957 – Gaspare "Jasper" Calo – stepped down
- 1957–1974 – Joseph P. Zammuto – died on May 18, 1990
- 1974–1987 – Frank J. Buscemi – died on December 7, 1987
- 1987–1994 – Charles Vincent "Charlie Vinci" Vince – died January 24, 1994
- 1994–2000 – Sebastian J. "Knobby" Gulotta – died on March 15, 2000
- 2000–2005 – Frank "Gumba" Saladino – died April 2005

=== Underboss (official and acting) ===
- 1930s–1961 – Gaspare "Jasper" Calo – retired to Sicily died July 1973
  - Acting 1960–1961 – Frank J. Buscemi – became underboss
- 1961–1974 – Frank J. Buscemi – became boss
- 1974–1987 – Charles "Vinci" Vince – became boss

=== Consigliere ===
- 1957–1981 – Joseph "Diamond Joe" Zito – died in 1981
- 1981–1990 – Joseph Zammuto – died on May 18, 1990

== Former members ==
- Joseph Zammuto (born on February 16, 1896) – former boss. Zammuto was born in Sicily. In March 1913, Zammuto and his brother, Rosario, immigrated to the United States aboard the S.S. Sant'Anna ship. By 1917, Zammuto was residing on 421 Knowlton Street in Rockford. In 1921, he married Lena Schiro, and the couple lived on 1027 Ferguson Street by 1930. In May 1959, Zammuto had ordered the murder of 21-year old Donald Burton and 21-year old Joseph Greco Jr. and it is believed that Frank Buscemi and Philip "Phil the Tailor" Emordeno had participated in both murder's and were inducted into the Rochester as the result of the murder's. In January 1965, Zammuto ordered the murder of 51-year old Charles LaFranka, and LaFranka was found beaten and strangled to death inside the trunk of a car located on East Chicago St in Elgin, Illinois, Frank Correnti, Sebastian "Knobby" Gulotta and Joseph Maggio were inducted into the Rochester family after participating in the LaFranka murder. In November 1965, Zammuto was arrested by the Rockford Police Department for an unknown charge. In December 1968, Zammuto was subpoenaed to testify before a Federal Grand Jury in Freeport, Illinois. He died in May 1990.
- Joseph "Diamond Joe" Zito (born on June 5, 1906) – former consigliere. Zito was born in Sicily. By the 1930s, Zito resided in Rockford and questioned by law enforcement regarding his participation in two murders. In September 1935, he married Mary Gaziano. By 1942, he was employed with the Town Tavern located on 602 State Street. According to the Rockford Police Department, Zito was heavily involved in bootlegging during prohibition and human trafficking, and was a member of the Italian "Black Hand". In December 1947, Zito was arrested by the Rockford Police Department for an unknown charge. By the 1960s, Zito resided on 2612 Rural Street and was the consigliere for the Rockford family around this time. In April 1971, Zito and Philip Emordeno were indicted by the U.S. Attorney's Office in Freeport, Illinois, for failure to pay federal tax of $54 per year on a retail liquor operation, and was fined $1000 in December 1972. He died in June 1981.
- Frank Correnti (born on October 28, 1911) – former soldier. Correnti was born in Rockford, Illinois, and his family hailed from Sicily. By 1940, Correnti resided on 968 North Main Street and was a registered car salesman with Herb & Bussey Motors located on North Madison Street. In August 1962, Correnti was arrested for an unknown charge. In January 1965, Correnti was inducted as a member of the Rockford family. He died in January 1985.
- Joseph "Gramps" Marinelli (born on January 14, 1918) – former soldier. Marinelli was born in Rockford, Illinois, and his family hailed from Lazio. By 1930, the Marinelli family resided on 812 Ferguson Street. By 1940, he was residing on 2626 Knight Ave, and several months after, he had relocated on 814 Broad St in Beloit, Wisconsin, and operated the Olympia Bakery located on 924 Pleasant. In 1943, he served in the U.S. Army and was discharged in November 1945, following discharge, Marinelli moved to 632 Cunningham Street, and by 1950, he lived on Island Ave, as a salesman for a collection company. By the 1950s, Marinelli was inducted as a formal member in the Rockford family by boss, Tony Musso. In June 1963, he was arrested by the Rockford Police Department for an unknown charge. In December 1968, Marinelli was indicted along with Joseph Zammuto, Frank Buscemi, Charles Vince, Philip Cannella, Al Cicero, Frank Correnti, Joseph Maggio and Philip Priola, to testify before a Federal Grand Jury in Freeport, Illinois. In July 1976, he was indicted for fraud by the U.S. Attorney's Office in Illinois. He died in June 1980.
