= David Yaras =

Jewish-American organized crime figure

- Born: November 7, 1912; Chicago, Illinois, U.S.
- Died: January 4, 1974 (aged 61); Miami, Florida, U.S.
- Other name: "Dave"
- Occupation: Mobster
- Allegiance: Chicago Outfit

David "Dave" Yaras (November 7, 1912 – January 4, 1974) was a Jewish-American organized crime figure associated with the Chicago Outfit. He was a partner of Leonard Patrick and one of the most active of the organized crime hitmen during the 1940s until the 1960s. Together with Patrick he was the leader of Jewish organized crime in Chicago.

== Biography ==
Yaras was involved with the Teamsters union, helping to organize the branch Local 320 in Miami with the close Jimmy Hoffa ally Rolland McMaster. Santo Trafficante Jr., boss of the Trafficante crime family, used Local 320 as a front for his activities. It was occasionally used as his headquarters and facilitated narcotics trafficking by providing trucks for transportation. Yaras and Trafficante dined and drank together. He functioned as a go-between for Trafficante and Carlos Marcello in New Orleans. He also served as a liaison between Chicago and organized crime in Miami and briefly was a mentor to Frank Rosenthal.

The Kefauver Committee of the US Senate determined that Yaras was a hitman for Sam Giancana and was involved in the slot machine and pinball business of Al Capone. He was also of interest to the McClellan Committee, with Senator Bobby Kennedy describing Yaras as "a notorious Chicago racketeer who has been involved with many of the leading racketeers in the Midwest".

For a time he served as Jake Guzik's chauffeur. Yaras' partner in crime was his fellow Jewish Chicagoan, Leonard Patrick. They were particularly close, so much so that Yaras named one of his sons after Patrick. Lenny Yaras would go on to become one of Patrick's lieutenants. On 14 January 1944 Benjamin "Zukie the Bookie" Zuckerman, the boss of an independent gang in the Lawndale section of Chicago, was murdered, with Yaras and Patrick considered the likely culprits. Subsequently they became the leaders of organized crime in the Jewish neighborhoods of Chicago, specifically greater Lawndale and Maxwell Street. They took over Zuckerman's gambling operations and Yaras acquired the Multiple Sports News Service, co-owned with Mike Coppola of the Genovese crime family. On 6 April 1945, Willie Tarsch, who controlled what remained of Zuckerman's operations, was shot in the head by Yaras with a shotgun.

In 1946 he was taken into custody by the Chicago PD in connection with the kidnapping and ransoming of Edward P. Jones. On 24 January 1946, Yaras, Patrick and William Block ambushed James Ragen at an intersection. They hid behind crates of fruit inside a stolen truck before firing at Ragen with shotguns when his car stopped at a traffic light. Both of Ragen's bodyguards were injured and Ragen himself was rushed to the hospital where he later succumbed to his wounds. On 8 March 1947 Yaras, Patrick and Block were indicted on the charge of murdering Ragen. One witness named Yaras and Block as the shooters and Patrick as the getaway driver. Although on 3 April 1947 the indictment was dropped after one of the three witnesses was murdered and the two others refused to testify. The same trio would also be arrested for the shotgunning of Theodore Roe in August 1947. Due to the modus operandi followed, Patrick and Yaras are suspects in the 1947 murder of Bugsy Siegel. In 1952 they shot David Zatz.

Yaras had business interests in Cuba, specifically gambling. He was a partner in the Sans Souci Cabaret in Havana when it was owned by Sammy Mannarino. After Cuban dictator Fulgencio Batista was overthrown by Fidel Castro's Cuban Revolution, Yaras became a liaison between the Chicago Outfit and Cuban exiles. On February 8, 1959, the Miami Herald ran a story on a fight at Sonny's Restaurant on 23rd street in which Dave Yaras, who was out on bail for a Miami Beach holdup, had beaten an unidentified Cuban with a pistol butt. Joe Massei was on the scene, and greeted the six policemen who turned up to investigate. No police report was filed and the Herald reporter could not get any clear information on what had happened.

In April 1961 he attended the wedding of Linda Lee, Chicago boss Tony Accardo's daughter, and Michael Palermo. In August 1961 Yaras took part in the torture and murder of suspected informant William Jackson. Jackson was hung on a meat hook and tortured extensively. A cattle prod had been used on his rectum and genitals, his limbs were stabbed with an ice pick and his penis had been incinerated with a blowtorch. He death was the result of gunshot wounds. While in Miami in January 1962, Yaras was recorded by the FBI in an electronic eavesdropping operation discussing the proposed killing of Frank Esposito with his fellow mobsters Jackie Cerone, Fiore Buccieri and James Torello. The Florida authorities were subsequently tipped off. Yaras and Patrick were suspects in the murder of Alderman Benjamin F. Lewis in February 1963, after the FBI received a tip from an informant that the duo had killed Lewis. However neither were charged and the murder remains unsolved to this day.

=== Jack Ruby ===
Following Jack Ruby's killing of Lee Harvey Oswald in police custody after Oswald had been charged with assassinating John F. Kennedy, Yaras was interviewed by the FBI on December 6, 1963. Yaras maintained that though he knew Ruby when he was young, he had not seen him since Ruby had left Chicago for Dallas approximately 14 years earlier, and that Ruby had not been associated with the Chicago Outfit. He added that his brother Sam Yaras had known Ruby, and that he was connected with a machinery business in Dallas, but that he had fallen out with his brother in 1945 and consequently had not been to Dallas. In 1978 the House Select Committee on Assassinations (HSCA), which was probing Ruby's links to organized crime figures, concluded that Yaras and Ruby were "acquainted during Ruby's years in Chicago, particularly in the 1930s and 1940s," but that "the committee found no evidence that Ruby was associated with Yaras or [Leonard] Patrick during the 1950s or 1960s." In a deposition before the HSCA, Leonard Patrick testified that "[Yaras] talked to [Ruby], too, you know. He knew him as a friend, too, more than I did."

== Death ==
On 4 January 1974 David Yaras died of a heart attack, aged 61, in Miami while playing golf. Weeks later his son Ronald was murdered. Another son, Leonard, was slain in a gangland shooting in Chicago in January 1985. Yaras' death was a major blow to his partner Leonard Patrick, who immediately flew to Miami to try to keep afloat the joint-enterprises they had established.
