= James Torello =

American mobster

- Born: December 15, 1930; Chicago, Illinois, U.S.
- Died: April 13, 1979 (aged 48); Woodridge, Illinois, U.S.
- Other names: "Jimmy"; "Turk"
- Occupation: Mobster
- Allegiance: Chicago Outfit

James Vincent "Turk" Torello (December 15, 1930 – April 13, 1979) was an American mobster who became a caporegime and leading enforcer for the Chicago Outfit during the mid-to-late 1970s.

== Biography ==
Born in Chicago, Illinois, Torello's first arrest was in 1945; he was eventually convicted of auto theft, armed robbery, burglary and hijacking. He served two years in federal prison for violating firearms laws. Torello served as capo of the South Side/26th Street crew.

In the late 1960s, Torello sent Robert "Bobby the Beak" Siegel to Las Vegas to help collect $87,000 from an associate of Frank "Lefty" Rosenthal, the Outfit agent at the Stardust Hotel & Casino. This story was related by Siegel at the "Family Secrets" organized crime trial, in Chicago, in the summer of 2007.

In April 1961 he attended the wedding of Linda Lee, Chicago boss Tony Accardo's daughter, and Michael Palermo. Torello was involved in the August 1961 torture and murder of William "Action" Jackson, believed to have been an informant. Jackson was hung on a meat hook and tortured extensively. A cattle prod had been used on his rectum and genitals, his limbs were stabbed with an ice pick and his penis had been incinerated with a blowtorch. He died by gunshot wounds. While in Miami in January 1962, Torello was recorded by the FBI in an electronic eavesdropping operation discussing the proposed killing of Frank Esposito with his fellow mobsters Jackie Cerone, David Yaras and Fiore Buccieri. The Florida authorities were subsequently tipped off.

By the early 1970s, Torello had become a high-ranking member within the Outfit. In 1973, with the death of Fiore "Fifi" Buccieri, Torello became the Outfit's chief enforcer. He also became involved in loan sharking, illegal gambling and pornography.

In the late 1970s Torello bought a home in Palm Springs, California, and in April 1979, he died of cancer at Northwestern Memorial Hospital in Chicago at age 48 .
