= Forty-Two Gang =

Teenage street gang in Chicago, Illinois, USA

- Founded: 1925
- Years active: 1925–1934
- Ethnicity: Italian-American

The Forty-Two Gang was a teenage street gang in Chicago that started during Prohibition. Like Brooklyn's Italian and Jewish street gangs of Brownsville and Ocean Hill, the Forty-Two Gang served as a "farm team" for future members of the Chicago Outfit. Forty-Two Gang members included future syndicate members Sam Giancana, Sam "Teets" Battaglia, Luigi "Cockeyed Louie" Fratto, Felix "Milwaukee Phil" Alderisio, "Mad Sam" DeStefano, Charles "Chuckie" Nicoletti, Fiore "Fifi" Buccieri, William "Smokes" Aloisio, Frank "Skids" Caruso, William "Willie Potatoes" Daddano, Joseph DiVarco, Marcello Caifano, Mario DeStefano, Bruno Tassione, and Joey "Cowboy" Miletta.

In 1931, sociologists at the University of Chicago determined that of the original members, over thirty had been killed, seriously wounded or imprisoned on a variety of charges, including murder, armed robbery and sexual assault.

== Early history ==
The Forty-Two Gang started in 1925, with twenty-four members (some as young as nine years). The boys supposedly named their gang after Ali Baba and the Forty Thieves, claiming they were one better than their fictional namesakes. The gang came from Chicago neighborhoods known as "the Patch" and "Little Hell", located to the northwest and near north of the loop.

From the beginning, the gang became notorious for a number of different crimes: vandalism, petty theft, car stripping, stealing of carts or horses from the stables of local fruit peddlers (sometimes reportedly killing stolen horses to supply horse meat), burglary of cigar stores and staging armed holdups of prominent nightclubs. The Forty-Two Gang soon emerged as one of the most violent gangs in the city; however, they suffered heavy losses as the result of wars with rival gangs. The gang also had a high rate of arrests for murders of robbery victims, suspected informants and police officers.

== Rebelling against authorities ==
In 1928, a number of Forty-Two Gang members were being held at the Illinois state boys' reformatory in St. Charles, Illinois. One day, Major William J. Butler, commander of that facility, received the following threat from a gang member. "Unless you let our pals go, we'll come down there and kill everybody we see. We've got plenty of men and some machine guns." Butler was inclined to dismiss it; however, Chicago police officials advised him to take it seriously. After arming himself, Butler called up the Illinois National Guard to defend the reformatory.

Several days later, three juvenile gang members, led by "Crazy" Patsy Steffanelli, were caught outside the reformatory walls. Once taken into custody, the boys bragged that they were a scouting party sent to infiltrate machine gunners into the facility.

The St. Charles incident was widely covered by the Chicago press. Many critics called for a tougher stance against juvenile offenders; the Chicago Tribune declared that the only decision facing authorities was whether to sentence gang members to Joliet Prison or send them to the electric chair.

== The Forty-Two Gang & the Chicago Syndicate ==
The press coverage and media attention on the 42ers caught the notice of the city's bootlegging gangs, specifically Al Capone's Chicago Outfit. Gang members frequently committed robberies just so they could blow wads of money in the Outfit's speakeasies and other underworld hangouts. The Outfit would occasionally hire gang members as beer runners or truck drivers; however, they were generally considered too risky to have around.

However, one Forty-Two Gang member did stand out--Sam "Momo" Giancana. Giancana had built a reputation as a skilled wheelman who was calm under pressure. Giancana became the first Forty-Two member to join the Outfit. He eventually became a protégé of Tony "Joe Batters" Accardo and Paul "The Waiter" Ricca. With his induction, Giancana was able to eventually bring a number of his fellow gang members into the Outfit. Giancana became operating head of the Outfit in 1957, and many of the former Forty-Two members would go on to rule the Outfit well into the 1970s.

While the Outfit welcomed Giancana and other Forty-Two members, it was less hospitable to some others, such as Paul Battaglia, an early gang leader who robbed many illegal horse betting rooms and handbooks during the mid-1930s; the Outfit eliminated him in 1938 due to his interference in their operations.
