= William Jackson (gangster) =

American informant and gangster

- Born: December 13, 1920; Chicago, Illinois, U.S.
- Died: August 11, 1961 (aged 40); Streeterville, Chicago, Illinois, U.S.
- Other name: Action Jackson
- Occupations: Enforcer, loan collector
- Employer: Chicago Outfit

William Jackson, also known as Action Jackson (December 13, 1920 – August 11, 1961) was an enforcer and loan collector for the Chicago Outfit. He earned his nickname of "Action" because it was slang for "Juice Man", which meant debt-collector. He was tortured to death by his fellow gangsters, allegedly on suspicion that he had become an informant for the FBI.

== Criminal career ==
Chicago police described Jackson as "a man with the body of a giant and the brain of a child", who was known in syndicate circles as a mob "juice" collector who specialized in pain for delinquent customers. In 1941 he was arrested in Green Bay, Wisconsin, for assault and robbery. In 1947, he was arrested and charged with rape, but was not convicted. In 1949, he was arrested and sentenced to four to eight years in prison for robbery. In 1953, he was paroled and became a muscle man for gangsters in Chicago.

In 1961, Jackson was arrested along with five others at a warehouse as they were unloading $70,000 worth of electrical appliances from a stolen truck. While the others tried to escape, Jackson stood still because he was too fat to run. Agents learned that Jackson was a "juice" collector for Sam DeStefano.

== Suspected informant ==
In 1960, FBI agent Bill Roemer asked Jackson to become an informant for the FBI. Being a loyal member of the Outfit, Jackson declined.

Nonetheless, in 1961 Jackson was so accused. According to sources, he was kidnapped and taken to a meat-rendering plant on Chicago's South Side, where he was tortured by Outfit gangsters. It is suspected that his killers took Jackson there at gunpoint, where he was tortured and killed in what is known as one of the most brutal gangland killings in American history.

== Torture and death ==
Jackson was hung on a meat hook and tortured extensively. A cattle prod had been used on his rectum and genitals, his limbs were stabbed with an ice pick and his penis had been incinerated with a blowtorch. He died by gunshot wounds. Among those involved in Jackson's treatment were David Yaras, Jackie Cerone, Fiore Buccieri and James Torello. Jackson's body was found on August 12, 1961, in the trunk of his own car, which had been abandoned on Lower Wacker Drive in Chicago.

== Other theories ==
According to Gus Russo, author of The Outfit, there were Mob insiders who believed Jackson was killed for raping an imprisoned Mob-connected burglar's wife. Russo also states that Mrs. Humphreys, wife of Outfit fixer Murray "The Camel" Humphreys, asserted the conversation where the government learned about Jackson's fate was staged by mobsters who were aware that the government had planted a microphone. These possibilities have not been verified.

== On film ==
Jackson's death is named and shown near the beginning of the semi-biographical movie on Lee Harvey Oswald assassin Jack Ruby named Ruby. He is portrayed by Frank Orsatti in the film.

== See also ==
- List of homicides in Illinois § Organized crime
