= Bicchieri =

Bicchieri is a surname. Notable people with the surname include:

- Cristina Bicchieri (born 1950), Italian-American philosopher
- Emilia Bicchieri (1238–1314), Italian Dominican nun
- Guala Bicchieri (c. 1150–1227), Italian diplomat and cardinal

== See also ==
- Bucchieri
