= Frank Caruso =

Frank Caruso may refer to:

- Frank T. Caruso (1911–1983), Chicago mobster
- Frank Caruso (chemical engineer), professor at the University of Melbourne, Australia
- Frank Caruso (Italian guitarist)
