= Jackie Cerone =

American gangster

John Cerone
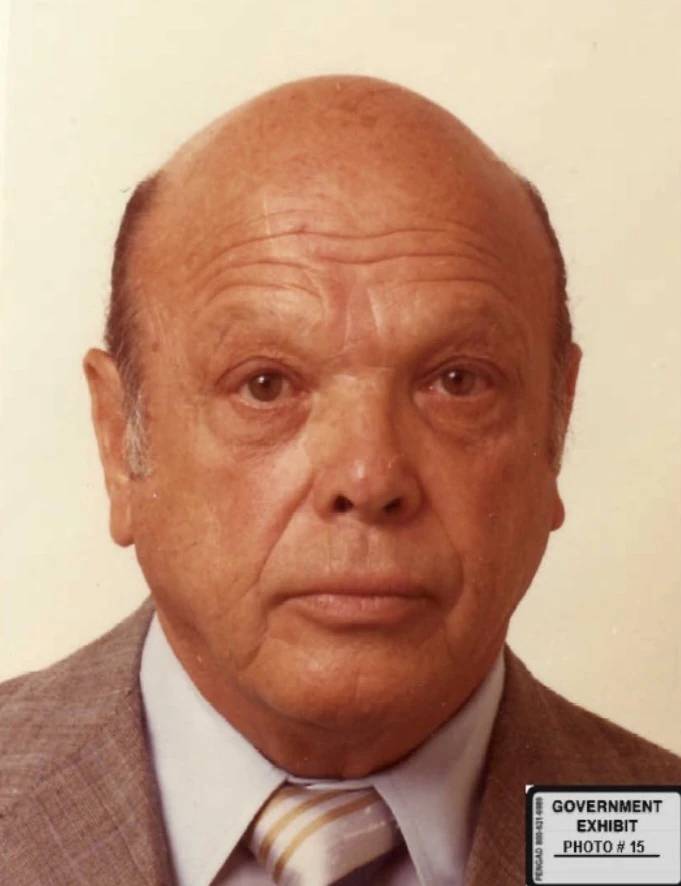
- Cerone's mugshot
- Born: John Philip Cerone Jr. July 7, 1914; Chicago, Illinois, U.S.
- Died: July 26, 1996 (aged 82); Barrington, Illinois, U.S.
- Other name: "Jackie the Lackey"
- Occupation: Mobster
- Spouse: Clara Cerone
- Children: 2
- Allegiance: Chicago Outfit

John Philip Cerone Jr. (July 7, 1914 – July 26, 1996), nicknamed Jackie the Lackey, was an American mobster who served as front boss of the Chicago Outfit crime family during the late 1960s and later became underboss until his imprisonment in 1986 for skimming millions of dollars of untaxed gambling proceeds from the Las Vegas casino industry.

== Early life ==
John Philip Cerone Jr. was the eighth of eleven children born to Italian immigrants John Cerone Sr. and Rose Valant. He was the younger brother of mobster Frank "Skippy" Cerone, father of lawyer John Peter Cerone, and husband of the late Clara Cerone.

== Criminal career ==
After dropping out of school, Cerone became a chauffeur for his mentor, the mobster Joseph "Joey Doves" Aiuppa. Cerone's criminal record began in 1937 when he was arrested as a suspect in the murder of a gangster on the West Side of Chicago. He was acquitted when a coroner's jury reported it could find no evidence that Cerone was involved in the killing. By the mid-1940s, Cerone was the chauffeur and protégé of Chicago Outfit mob boss Antonino "Joe Batters" Accardo.

Cerone, who stood at 5 ft 6 in (1.68 m) and weighed 195 pounds (88 kg), was a self-proclaimed bookmaker who cultivated an image as a generous and amiable figure, although law enforcement considered him a senior mafioso and experienced mob killer. In April 1961 he attended the wedding of Linda Lee, Chicago boss Tony Accardo's daughter, and Michael Palermo. Cerone was part of the enforcer team that tortured and murdered loan shark William "Action" Jackson in August 1961. While in Miami in January 1962, Cerone was recorded by the Federal Bureau of Investigation (FBI) in an electronic eavesdropping operation discussing the proposed killing of Chicago Outfit member Frank Esposito with his fellow mobsters Fiore Buccieri, David Yaras and Jimmy Torello. The Florida authorities were subsequently tipped off.

Cerone became Accardo's front boss in 1967, overseeing the Outfit's day-to-day activities until 1969, when he was indicted in a federal gambling case. As a result of the cooperation of Outfit associate and FBI informant Louis Bombacino, Cerone, his cousin James Cerone, Donald Angelini, Joseph Ferriola, and Frank Aureli were charged in February 1969 with operating a multi-million dollar interstate gambling enterprise. Cerone and his co-defendants were convicted in May 1970 and each sentenced to five years in federal prison.

After being released from the Federal Correctional Institution in Leavenworth, Kansas in 1973, Cerone allegedly dispatched a hitman to murder Bombacino, who was tracked down and discovered to be living in the Federal Witness Protection Program in Tempe, Arizona under the alias "Joseph Nardi". On October 6, 1975, Bombacino was killed in a car bombing when he started the engine of his Lincoln Continental automobile outside his home in Tempe.

Cerone then served as the underboss of the Outfit, forming part of the crime family's ruling administration along with boss Accardo and front boss Aiuppa. The trio of mobsters took up residence in Palm Springs, California, from where they ruled organized crime in Chicago. The alcoholic Cerone's drinking problem caused him to be considered a liability by Aiuppa, who was reportedly prevented by Accardo from having Cerone killed.

Cerone was among fifteen mobsters from the Chicago, Kansas City, Cleveland and Milwaukee crime families indicted on September 30, 1983 on federal charges related to the skimming of millions of dollars from the Teamsters' Central States pension fund and the Stardust, Fremont and Hacienda hotel casinos in Las Vegas. The indictments followed a five-year FBI investigation. Joseph Agosto, a Kansas City mobster and a Las Vegas show producer, who produced the Folies Bergere at the Tropicana hotel casino, turned state's evidence and testified against the mob bosses. After a four-month trial, Cerone was convicted of conspiring to embezzle untaxed gambling profits along with Aiuppa, Joseph Lombardo, Carl "Corky" Civella, Angelo "The Hook" LaPietra and Carl "Tuffy" DeLuna on January 22, 1986. Milwaukee organized crime boss Frank Balistrieri was convicted in the same case in December 1985. Cerone was sentenced on March 25, 1986 to 28 years in federal prison and fined over $143,000. The Chicago FBI Chief Edward Hegarty called the convictions "the most significant prosecution of organized-crime figures in the history of the U.S." at the time.

== Death ==
Cerone was incarcerated at Leavenworth Federal Correctional Institution, and developed intestinal cancer in prison. He died of natural causes, aged 82, at Good Shepherd Hospital in Barrington, Illinois, six days after being granted parole from prison.

American Mafia
Preceded by Sam Battaglia	Chicago Outfit Boss; 1966–1969	Succeeded by Felix Alderisio
