= William Aloisio =

American mobster and hitman (1906–1979)

- Born: October 9, 1906
- Died: October 3, 1979 (aged 72)
- Occupations: Mobster; hitman
- Allegiance: Forty-Two Gang; Chicago Outfit
- Penalty: Five years in prison

Details
- Imprisoned at: Federal Correctional Institution, Leavenworth

William "Smokes" Aloisio (October 9, 1906 – October 3, 1979) was an American mobster and hitman for the Chicago Outfit.

A former member of the Forty-Two Gang in Chicago, Aloisio's arrest record dated back to 1928. In 1945, Aloisio was sentenced to five years at Leavenworth Penitentiary, in Leavenworth, Kansas, for helping his brother avoid military conscription, during World War II. Aloisio had bribed U.S. Navy personnel in Chicago to make sure that his relative failed his physical examination.
