= Sam Battaglia =

American mobster (1908–1973)

- Battaglia's mugshot
- Born: Salvatore Joseph Battaglia; November 5, 1908; Chicago, Illinois, U.S.
- Died: September 7, 1973 (aged 64); Chicago, Illinois, U.S.
- Other name: "Teets"
- Occupation: Crime boss
- Allegiance: Chicago Outfit

Salvatore Joseph "Sam" Battaglia (November 5, 1908 – September 7, 1973) was an American mobster and high-level member of the Chicago Outfit crime family.

== Early career ==
Battaglia was born in Chicago, Illinois to Italian parents from Termini Imerese, Sicily. At age 16, Battaglia joined bosses Johnny Torrio and Al Capone in the Chicago Outfit at the start of the gang war against the mostly Irish North Side Gang, which was underboss Dean O'Banion. By the late 1930s, Battaglia had become a high-ranking member of the Outfit and a formidable loan shark. Debtors behind in their payments would be brought to Battaglia in the back room of the Casa Madrid restaurant, in Melrose Park, IL., where they would be severely beaten or killed. Supposedly, Battaglia's nickname "Teets" came from one such encounter. Another mobster was questioning Battaglia's handling of a debtor, and Battaglia yelled back at him, "Shaddup, or I'll bust ya in da teets!"

== Outfit member ==
By 1950, Battaglia had an extensive criminal record that included over 12 counts of burglary, robbery, and murder (he was a suspect in seven homicides). A close associate of Outfit boss Giancana, Battaglia was considered Giancana's successor once he stepped down. While testifying before the Permanent Subcommittee on Investigations of the U.S. Senate Committee on Government Operations investigations on organized crime, Battaglia pleaded the Fifth Amendment to the United States Constitution over 60 times.

As long-time Outfit leader Antonino ("Tony," "Joe Batters") Accardo stepped away from the limelight to shield himself in the 1950s, Battaglia struggled for power along with rivals Giancana, Felix Alderisio and Fiore "Fifi" Buccieri. In 1965, Battaglia became outfit boss, succeeding Giancana, who had fled the country. However, in 1967, Battaglia was convicted of violating the Hobbs Act for obstructing interstate commerce and sentenced to 15 years. With Battaglia in prison and Giancana living in exile in Mexico, Felix "Milwaukee Phil" Alderisio took over as day-to-day boss.

In April 1961 he attended the wedding of Linda Lee, Chicago boss Tony Accardo's daughter, and Michael Palermo.

== Bibliography ==
- Kelly, Robert J. Encyclopedia of Organized Crime in the United States. Westport, Connecticut: Greenwood Press, 2000. ISBN 0-313-30653-2
- Sifakis, Carl. The Mafia Encyclopedia. New York: Da Capo Press, 2005. ISBN 0-8160-5694-3
- Sifakis, Carl. The Encyclopedia of American Crime (2nd. ed) New York: Facts on File Inc., 2005. ISBN 0-8160-4040-0

American Mafia
Preceded by Sam Giancana	Chicago Outfit Boss; 1966	Succeeded by Jackie Cerone
