= Fred Roti =

American politician

Fred Bruno Roti
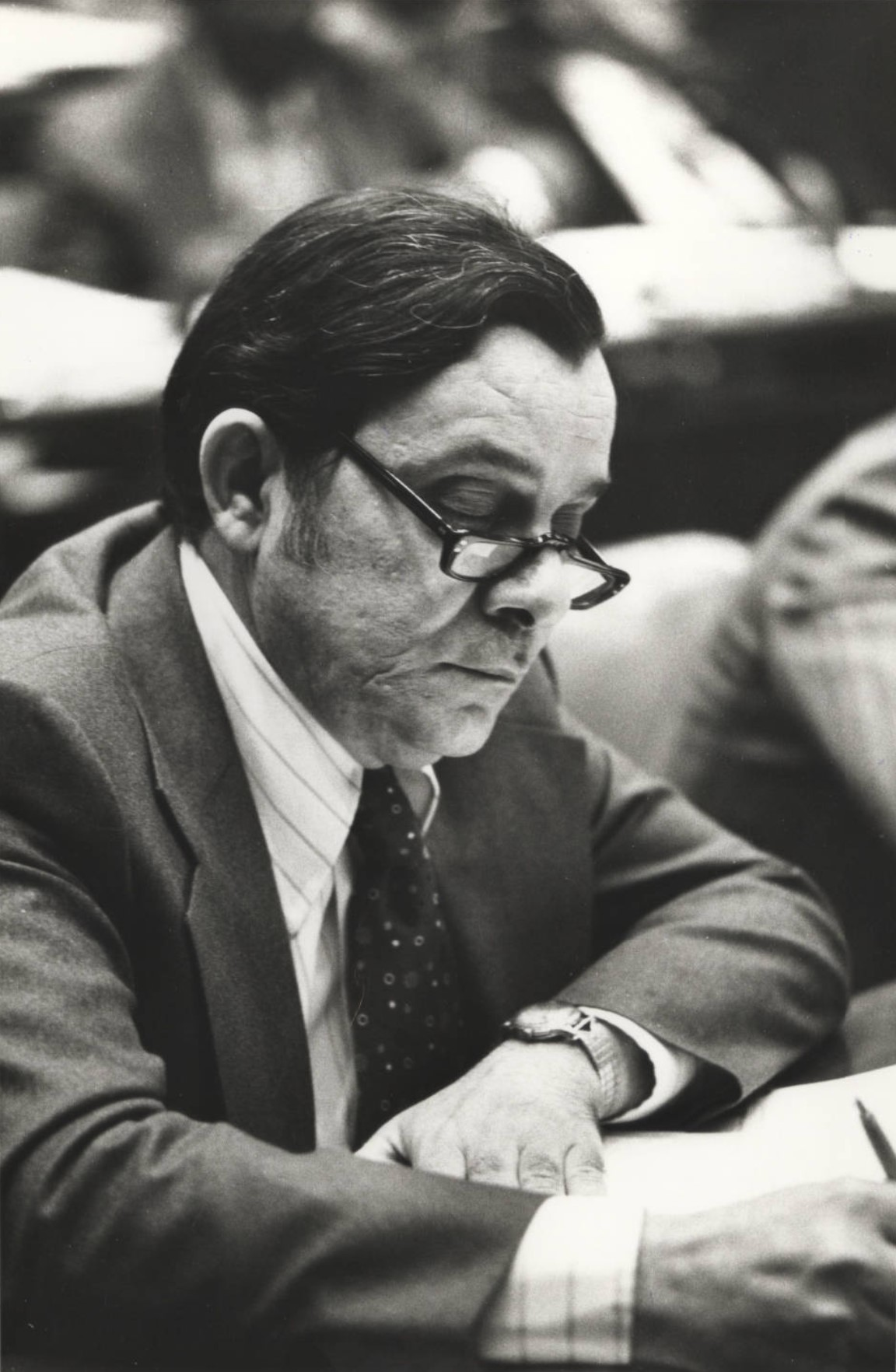
- Born: December 18, 1920; Chinatown, Chicago, Illinois, U.S.
- Died: September 20, 1999 (aged 78)
- Political party: Democratic

Fred Bruno Roti (December 18, 1920 – September 20, 1999) was an American Democratic politician from Chicago, Illinois. He was a state senator for six years, and an alderman for 24 years. He was a loyal member of the "Machine" established by Mayor Richard J. Daley, and widely believed to be an associate of the Mafia. In 1993, he was convicted in Federal court of 11 criminal counts, and was sent to prison.

== Background ==
Roti was born in an apartment in Chinatown. Fred's father, Bruno Roti, Sr., known as "Bruno the Bomber", was a henchman of Al Capone, was arrested twice in murder investigations, and was the first capo of what became the 26th Street/Chinatown "crew" of the Chicago Outfit. He owned a grocery store on the 2100 block of S. Wentworth Avenue, less than six blocks away from Capone's headquarters, the Lexington Hotel, at 2135 S. Michigan Avenue.

Fred Roti's start in city government was modest: he shoveled asphalt on a city paving crew. During World War II, he served in the U.S. Navy as a machine-gunner on a boat in Europe. On his return to Chicago, Roti became active in the Democratic Party, serving as a precinct captain, and held a succession of mundane city and county jobs. The diminutive Fred Roti was nicknamed "Peanuts" because of his size and called "Freddie" by his friends.

Fred Roti was also the brother-in-law of Frank "Skids" Caruso, Roti, Sr.'s successor as capo.

== Illinois State Senator (1951–1957) ==
In 1950, Roti was tapped by the Democratic Party organization to run for Illinois state senator from the 1st District. At the time of his slating by the 1st Ward Democrats, Roti was described as "a state revenue department investigator and precinct captain." Roti faced nominal Republican opposition in the election on November 7, 1950. He won easily, and served from 1951 to 1957. In the state legislature, Roti was a member of a bipartisan bloc of West Side lawmakers linked with organized crime, known as "The West Side Bloc." He was a consistent opponent of anti-crime bills.

In 1956, the state legislature was redistricted, and Roti's district was broken up. Roti retired from the legislature in 1957, returned to precinct work, and took a patronage job as a drain inspector with the city Department of Water and Sewers.

== Chicago alderman (1968-1993) ==
In 1968, Roti was tapped by the Democrats to replace 1st Ward Alderman Donald Parillo, who had resigned. Roti won the special election of 11 June. Roti was re-elected with little opposition to a full term in 1971, and again in 1975, 1979, 1983, 1987, and 1991. He became Chairman of the Buildings Committee.

=== The "literary club": "Booth One" at Counsellor's Row ===
Roti's 1st Ward in Chicago was unique in that it included most of downtown Chicago, the "Chicago Loop", and City Hall. Roti was thus unique in having his ward office and political office directly across the street from his offices in City Hall. However, Roti's favorite location for political business was "Counsellor's Row", a restaurant also across LaSalle Street from City Hall, very popular with politicians. Roti usually occupied "Booth One" with his cronies, who included several aldermen, ward committeemen, state legislators, and other prominent Democrats. The group was nicknamed "the literary club". In 1988, a busboy discovered a secret FBI video camera monitoring Booth One.

== Indictment and conviction ==
In 1990, Federal prosecutors indicted Roti and four other Chicago Democrats for numerous acts of corruption, including racketeering, racketeering conspiracy, bribery, and extortion. The charges were based on evidence including recordings from "Booth One". On January 15, 1993, Roti was found guilty. He was convicted on 11 counts, including two out of three "fixing" charges: taking $10,000 for influencing a civil court case and $7,500 to support a routine zoning change, both in 1989. But he was acquitted of the most serious allegation, sharing $72,500 for fixing a Chinatown murder trial in 1981. Roti was sentenced to four years incarceration and served three years in a minimum-security prison in Oxford, Wisconsin followed by six months in a work-release program with The Salvation Army.

== "Made man" ==
In 1983, former FBI agent William Roemer told the U.S. Senate Permanent Subcommittee on Investigations that "informants continue to advise through the years {that} former 1st Ward alderman John D'Arco and Roti were the front men for businessman Pat Marcy and for the mob."

Roti was identified as a member of La Cosa Nostra in the 1991 Annual Report of the Attorney General of the United States.

On August 11, 1999, in a civil racketeering complaint against the Chicago Laborers District Council (CLDC), the Justice Department described Roti:

Fred Roti was convicted of Racketeer Influenced and Corrupt Organizations Act (RICO) conspiracy, bribery, and extortion regarding the fixing of criminal cases in the Circuit Court of Cook County, including murder cases involving organized crime members or associates and was sentenced to 48 months' imprisonment. Roti was released from prison in 1997. As First Ward alderman, Roti was a key political patronage boss and, along with his co‑defendant Pat Marcy, a fixer for the Chicago Outfit. Roti has directly participated in interfering with the rights of the members of Laborers' International Union of North America in the selection of their officers and officials in that he has improperly influenced the selection of officers of the CLDC and has been responsible for the pervasive hiring of mobster Angelo "the Hook" LaPietra's crew members and associates at the Chicago Streets and Sanitation Department. Roti is a "Made Member" of the Chicago Outfit.

An ill Roti never commented on the allegations.

== Death ==
Roti died September 20, 1999, at Rush-Presbyterian-St. Luke's Medical Center from complications from cancer.

== Legacy ==
Roti's legacy lives on through the many City of Chicago employees whose hiring he effected. He also led the fight for Chicago's handgun ban in Chicago's City Council. Roti was instrumental in the appointment of William Hanhardt as Chief of Detectives of the Chicago Police Department. Hanhardt was the Chicago Outfit's main plant, was convicted in 2001 of masterminding multimillion-dollar jewelry thefts, and served 10 years in prison.

== See also ==
- List of Chicago aldermen since 1923
