= Rolland McMaster =

American trade unionist

Rolland McMaster was a Teamsters union official and associate of Jimmy Hoffa.

== Biography ==
McMaster was Secretary-Treasurer of Local 299 in Detroit, Jimmy Hoffa's home local. Along with David Yaras, an associate of the Chicago Outfit, he helped found and organize Local 320 in Miami, Florida, which functioned as a front for mob boss Santo Trafficante Jr.

McMaster was brought before the US Senate's McClellan Committee to testify. Even when asked innocuous questions, like whether Yvonne McMaster was his wife, he pled the Fifth. Committeeman Sam Ervin responded "I will leave it up to you to answer her when you get home". In October 1961 he was charged with thirty-two counts of receiving illegal payments, in violation of the Taft-Hartley Act, amounting to just short of $9000. In 1966 he was convicted of extortion and served five months in prison.

When Frank Fitzsimmons replaced Hoffa as president in 1967, McMaster continued on in the union. Fitzsimmons had a high opinion of him, describing McMaster as a "good trade unionist who did a hell of a job in more ways than one." From 1972 to 1974 he led a $1.3 million organizing drive for the union, which only recruited approximately 750 drivers. In reality it was cover to extort employers in return for labour peace. In 1976 he officially received $46,215 as a "general organizer" under Fitzsimmons. He later became a supporter of far-right political activist Lyndon LaRouche. In 1979 he attended a speech of his at a Michigan Anti-Drug Coalition rally. He met with LaRouche who he hailed as the anti-drug candidate, in turn LaRouche's National Caucus of Labor Committees (NCLC) praised McMaster as "one of the most respected.....voices in all of organized labor". He joined the advisory board of the NCLC's "Committee Against Brilab and Abscam" (CABA). He endorsed LaRouche for the 1980 United States presidential election.

McMaster has been a suspect in the murder of Hoffa. He theorized that Hoffa ran off to Brazil with a black go-go dancer; "I hired a soothsayer and asked her where Jimmy was. That's what she told me". In 2006 a horse farm McMaster had owned at the time of Hoffa's disappearance was searched by the FBI for a period of two weeks, with the total operation cost reaching $250,000. The search was brought on by a tip received from federal detainee Donovan Wells, who had lived with McMaster on the farm. He told the FBI that on the day of Hoffa's disappearance he witnessed seeing a number of cars on the farm, which a short time later were gone. McMaster denied any involvement in Hoffa's murder and stated that he was away on union business in Indiana at the time.

He died in October 2007 aged 93.
