= Milwaukee crime family =

Milwaukee branch of the American Mafia

- Founded: c. 1918; 108 years ago
- Founder: Vito Guardalabene
- Founding location: Milwaukee, Wisconsin, United States
- Years active: c. 1918–2024
- Territory: Primarily the Milwaukee metropolitan area, with additional territory throughout Wisconsin, as well as Las Vegas
- Ethnicity: Italians as "made men" and other ethnicities as associates
- Membership (est.): 4 made members (2024)
- Activities: Racketeering, skimming, gambling, narcotics, murder, extortion, prostitution, bookmaking, bribery, and loan sharking
- Allies: Bonanno crime family; Chicago Outfit; Cleveland crime family; Kansas City crime family; Rockford crime family; St. Louis crime family
- Rivals: Various gangs in the Milwaukee area

The Milwaukee crime family, also known as the Balistrieri crime family or the Milwaukee Mafia, was an Italian American Mafia crime family based in Milwaukee, Wisconsin. The organization maintained links to other Midwestern Mafia families, including those in Chicago and Kansas City, and had over 50 "made" members at its peak. The family's most influential boss was Frank "Mr. Big" Balistrieri, who took control of the organization in the early 1960s and was greatly involved in the skimming of revenue from Las Vegas casinos. After the death of Balistrieri in 1993, the Chicago Outfit began gaining control over illegal rackets in the Milwaukee area. The Milwaukee family ultimately ceased to exist as an independent organization and was largely absorbed by the Chicago family.

== History ==
=== Origins ===
Italian-American organized crime in Milwaukee originated in the city's Third Ward, which was home to the majority of Milwaukee's Sicilian population in the early 20th century. The first known Mafia boss of Milwaukee was Vito Guardalabene, who immigrated to the United States from Santa Flavia, Sicily in 1903 and became naturalized U.S. citizen in 1911. Guardalabene was mentioned in the memoirs of Nicola Gentile as being "the king" of the Little Italy community in Milwaukee's Third Ward circa 1915. The syndicate headed by Guardalabene possibly originated as a branch of the Chicago Outfit. Upon Guardalabene's death from natural causes on February 6, 1921, his son Giovanni Battista "Peter" Guardalabene became boss of the Milwaukee crime family until 1924, when he turned over control of the family to a distant relative, Giuseppe "Big Joe" D'Amato. D'Amato died from pneumonia at the age of 41, on March 28, 1927.

=== Vallone, Ferrara and Alioto ===
Following the death of D'Amato, the Milwaukee Mafia was led by Joseph Vallone, who immigrated to the U.S. from Prizzi, Sicily in 1907. Vallone was the co-owner, along with Pasquale Migliaccio, of a wholesale grocery company which supplied sugar and other moonshining ingredients during the Prohibition era. During the late 1920s and early 1930s, a number of Sicilian mafiosi from Chicago were inducted into the Milwaukee family after relocating to the area. When the Commission was formed in 1931, it was decided that the Milwaukee family would remain under the control of and answer directly to the Chicago Outfit. In the early 1930s, Vallone was among 45 defendants indicted by a federal grand jury for operating a regional bootlegging syndicate. Following the repeal of Prohibition in 1933, Vallone and Migliaccio opened the Broadway Liquor Company. Vallone retired from racketeering in 1949, and died from natural causes on March 18, 1952.

Prior to his retirement, Vallone had groomed Salvatore "Sam" Ferrara, a relative and fellow native of Prizzi, to succeed him as boss of the Milwaukee family. In 1952, Ferrara became involved in a dispute with an underling, Frank Balistrieri, when he attempted to acquire an ownership share of the Ogden Social Club, a gambling venue owned by Balistrieri, to which Balistrieri resisted. Ferrara then expelled Balistrieri from the family, causing dissention in the Milwaukee Mafia. The membership of the family subsequently deposed of Ferrara by vote and requested the intervention of the Chicago Outfit to oust Ferrara. In November or December 1952, a panel of senior mobsters from Chicago responsible for overseeing the Milwaukee family, including Tony Accardo, Rocco Fischetti and Sam Giancana, ruled that Ferrara had abused his position and demoted him, installing Balistrieri's father-in-law, John Alioto, as the new boss. Balistrieri was subsequently reinstated as a member of the Mafia.

The Milwaukee family's influence grew significantly under Alioto's leadership, particularly within the labor movement. Alioto also introduced a leadership panel known as sagia to resolve disputes within the family. In 1954, John DiTrapani, a relative and godson of Sam Ferrara, along with Frank LoGalbo and Jack Enea, plotted to seize control of the family from Alioto. The rebellion was quelled with the murders of DiTrapani and Enea. DiTrapani was shot and killed in his car on March 18, 1954, and Enea was found shot to death in a ditch in Waukesha County on November 29, 1955. LoGalbo survived by transferring from the Milwaukee family to a Chicago family crew in Chicago Heights, Illinois, although he continued to reside in Milwaukee under the protection of the Outfit.

During his reign, Alioto reportedly groomed his son-in-law Frank Balistrieri to take control of the family when he retired. According to Federal Bureau of Investigation (FBI) reports, however, Alioto may have been opposed to Balistrieri becoming boss at the time of his retirement. The catalyst for this change in policy may have been an extramarital relationship that Balistrieri reportedly had outside of his marriage with Alioto's daughter. Nonetheless, Alioto attended a social function on December 27, 1961, which served as the official induction of Balistrieri as the new head of the Milwaukee family.

=== Balistrieri era ===
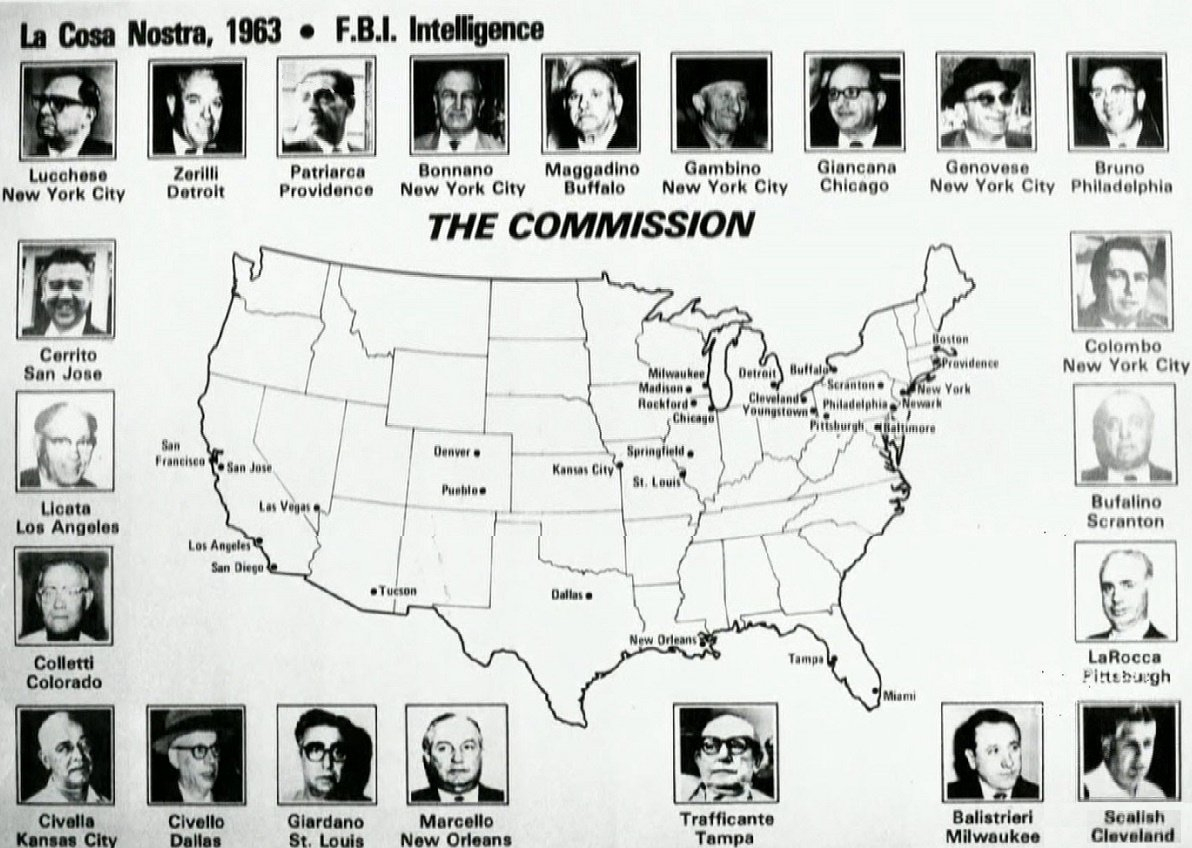
1963 FBI La Cosa Nostra chart

At the time he became boss, Balistrieri was overseeing a lucrative loansharking racket, held a monopoly over illegal sports betting in Milwaukee, and also had significant influence in the vending machine business. Seeking to increase the family's wealth and influence, Balistrieri imposed a "street tax" upon gambling racketeers as well as several legitimate businesses in Milwaukee, recruiting Joseph Gurera and Sebastian "Buster" Balestrere from Kansas City to enforce the protection racket. Balistrieri caused discontent in the family by promoting the newly arrived Gurera to the rank of capodecina as well as abolishing the sagia process and ruling in an autocratic fashion. He was protected from any insurrection, however, by his close relationship with leaders in the Chicago Outfit, especially Felix "Milwaukee Phil" Alderisio. From the 1960s until the 1980s, Balistrieri and his associates controlled almost a dozen bars, including some of Wisconsin's earliest gay bars.

By the 1960s, the FBI had several informants in the Milwaukee Mafia, including Joseph Gurera and August "Augie" Maniaci. The FBI also had an illegal wiretap planted in Balistrieri's office. In March 1967, Balistrieri was convicted of tax evasion and sentenced to two years in federal prison. He appointed his underboss and younger brother Peter Balistrieri to serve as acting boss during his absence. Balistrieri was released from the Federal Correctional Institution, Sandstone, Minnesota in June 1971.

On September 11, 1975, Milwaukee mobster and FBI informant August Maniaci was shot and killed outside his home on the city's East Side after feuding with Balistrieri. His brother, Vincent Maniaci, survived an attempted car bombing in August 1977 when twenty sticks of dynamite attached to his Buick Electra failed to explode. Vincent Maniaci subsequently fled to Honolulu.

In 1978, the FBI launched an undercover investigation into the Milwaukee family, with the FBI agent Gail T. "Ty" Cobb posing as a vending machine businessman using the undercover alias "Tony Conte". Another undercover FBI agent, Joseph D. Pistone, who was investigating the Bonanno crime family of New York under the alias "Donnie Brasco", introduced Cobb to Bonanno family soldier Benjamin "Lefty" Ruggiero who, in exchange for a fee, assisted Cobb in establishing himself in the vending business. Pistone visited Milwaukee several times in 1978 in an attempt to "form a marriage" between the Milwaukee and New York families. Initially unaware that "Conte" was under the protection of the Bonanno family, Balistrieri allegedly assigned three men to kill Cobb because he had entered the vending business without his permission. Ruggiero later arranged a meeting between Cobb and Balistrieri, at which Cobb obtained permission from Balistrieri to operate in Milwaukee. Frank Balistrieri and his sons, John and Joseph, entered into an agreement with "Conte" in August 1978 in which they became silent partners in the Best Vending Company, an FBI front company. Frank Balistrieri along with his two sons Joseph and John worked with Bonanno crime family capo Michael Sabella, and soldier Benjamin Ruggiero in extorting Best Vending Company from May 1978 to February 1979. The Balestrieris terminated the partnership in December 1978 due to their suspicions that "Conte" was a government agent. The Milwaukee family did not report these suspicions to the New York or Chicago families, however.

Fifteen members and associates of the Milwaukee and Bonanno families, including Balistrieri and his sons, were indicted by a federal grand jury on October 1, 1980, at the culmination of the FBI's three-year investigation. On April 9, 1984, Frank, John and Joseph Balistrieri were convicted in federal court in Green Bay of attempted extortion and conspiracy to commit extortion.

Simultaneous to the investigation into the vending business in Milwaukee, the FBI was also conducting Operation Strawman, a multi-state racketeering probe which focused on organized crime's infiltration of the casino industry in Las Vegas. Operation Strawman began in May 1978 and was carried out with the cooperation of the Justice Department's Organized Crime Strike Force as well as state and local law enforcement agencies. Frank, John and Joseph Balistrieri were among 15 mobsters indicted in September 1983 in relation to the skimming of over $2 million from casinos in Las Vegas. The Balistrieris and six other defendants went on trial in federal court in Kansas City beginning in September 1985. On December 31, 1985, Frank Balistrieri pleaded guilty to racketeering charges related to the skimming of profits from the Stardust and Fremont casinos. John and Joseph Balistrieri were each acquitted in the case. Frank Balistrieri was sentenced to ten years in prison to run concurrently with his previous 13-year sentence. During his imprisonment, Frank Balistireri appointed his brother, Peter Balistireri, acting boss.

The Strawman investigation resulted in the convictions of nineteen senior mobsters and virtually eliminated the leadership of the crime families in Milwaukee, Chicago and Kansas City. Balistrieri's imprisonment reportedly thwarted his appointment to the Mafia Commission. Balistrieri was released from the Federal Correctional Complex, Butner, North Carolina in November 1991. He died from a heart attack on February 7, 1993, at the age of 74.

=== Current status ===
The Milwaukee family began to decline during Frank Balistrieri's imprisonment and continued to weaken following his death. He was succeeded as head of the family by his brother and former acting boss, Peter Balistrieri, who died of natural causes on August 17, 1997. Joseph "Joe Camel" Caminiti, the former consigliere, then took control of the family. As the Milwaukee family deteriorated, the Chicago Outfit assigned South Side capo and street boss John "Johnny Apes" Montelone to seize control of organized crime in Milwaukee. By the late 1990s, the organization had less than 15 "made" members, and most of the lucrative rackets in the Milwaukee area had been taken over by the Chicago Mafia.

Further diminished by attrition, the Milwaukee Mafia ceased to function as an independent family, and essentially became a faction of the Chicago Outfit, in the late 2000s and early 2010s. Caminiti died, at the age of 87, on January 30, 2014. Peter "Pitch" Picciurro, the last known titular boss of the family, died on January 6, 2024, aged 94. As of 2024, there are as many as eight "made" members of the family still living.

== Historical leadership ==
=== Boss (official and acting) ===
- 1918–1921 — Vito Guardalabene — died on February 6, 1921, from natural causes.
- 1921–1927 — Giovanni "Peter" Guardalabene — the son of Vito Guardalabene
- 1927 — Joseph Amato — died of natural causes on March 28, 1927.
- 1927–1949 — Joseph Vallone — retired from the rackets in 1949 and died of natural causes on March 18, 1952.
- 1949–1952 — Sam Ferrara — in 1952 voted out by his family, so members of the Chicago Outfit forced him to step down. Died in 1977.
- 1952–1961 — John Alioto — trained his son-in-law Frank Balistrieri.
- 1961–1993 — Frank "Mr. Big" Balistrieri — imprisoned March 1967-June 1971; imprisoned 1983-1991 involvement in Las Vegas skim racket. Died on February 7, 1993.
  - Acting 1967–1971 — Joseph Balistrieri Sr. — Frank's son and capo, became underboss in 1993.
  - Acting 1971 — Joseph P. "Joe Camel" Caminiti — stepped down
  - Acting 1983–1993 — Peter Balistrieri — Frank Balistrieri's brother and underboss.
- 1993–1997 — Peter Balistrieri — died of natural causes on August 17, 1997
- 1997–2014 — Joseph P. "Joe Camel" Caminiti — served as Frank Balistrieri's consigliere; died on January 30, 2014.
- 2014–2024 — Peter "Pitch" Picciurro — died of natural causes on January 6, 2024.

=== Underboss ===
- 1927–1927 — Steven "Steve" DiSalvo — demoted in 1949.
- 1927–1961 — Joseph Gumina — moved to Kansas City, deceased in the 1970s.
- 1962–1978 — Joseph P. "Joe Camel" Caminiti — became consigliere
  - Acting 1971 — Peter Balistrieri
- 1978–1990 — Steven "Steve" DiSalvo — retired in the 1980s, deceased in the 1990s.
- 1990–1993 — Peter Balistrieri — became boss.
- 1993–2010 — Joseph "Joey Bal" Balistrieri Sr. — Frank's older son, deceased in 2010.

=== Consigliere ===
- 1927 — Vito Seidita — stepped down.
- 1927–1961 — Carmelo "Charles" Zarcone — demoted in 1961.
- 1961 — "Ruling Panel": Antonio Albano and John Alioto
- 1962–1969 — Carmelo "Charles" Zarcone — demoted in 1961, deceased in 1969.
- 1969–1978 — Vito Seidita — deceased in 1978.
- 1978–1997 — Joseph "Joe Camel" Caminiti — became boss.
- 1997–2014 — Peter "Pitch" Picciurro — became boss.
- 2014–2024 — John "Johnny Bal" Balistrieri — Frank's younger son, deceased on June 7, 2024.

== Current members ==
=== Soldiers ===
- John Candela — former member of the Madison crime family; transferred to the Milwaukee family after the family disbanded.
- Joseph "JoJo" Fugarino — initiated into family in 1993 by Peter Balistrieri.
- Dennis "Libby" LiBrizzi — former capo.
- Giovanni "Johnny Italy" Safina — became a "made" member in 1984.

== Former members ==
- John "Johnny Bal" Balistrieri — the younger son of Frank Balistrieri, the former boss of the Milwaukee family. John served as lawyer until 1984, when his license was suspended and he was later disbarred. In August 2014, John Balistrieri's application to reinstate his law license was rejected by the Wisconsin Supreme Court. He died on June 7, 2024.
- Peter "Pitch" Picciurro — former family boss, the owner of Pitch's Lounge and Restaurant and blood relative to Frank Balistrieri. The son of Milwaukee mobster John J. Picciurro and cousin to Frank and Peter Balistrieri. He died on January 6, 2024

== List of murders committed by the Milwaukee crime family ==
Name	Date	Reason
John DiTrapani	March 18, 1954	40-year-old DiTrapani was shot six times in his Cadillac in the Third Ward of Milwaukee after leading an insurrection against family boss John Alioto.
Jack Enea	November 29, 1955	46-year-old Enea, a co-conspirator of DiTrapani, was shot seven times and dumped in a ditch near Sussex.
Izzy Pogrob	January 9, 1960	Pogrob, an associate of the Milwaukee family, was found in a ditch with his hands tied, blindfolded and shot 9 times in the head and back, located along Highway 167 in Mequon, Ozaukee County in Wisconsin. It is believed Pogrob was murdered after he had informed on Louie Fazio to the police as Fazio had attempted to extort Pogrob, Fazio was later murdered in September 1972. Prior to his murder, Pogrob owned The Brass Rail located on North 3rd Street near Wells Street in downtown Milwaukee.
Anthony Anthony Bierna/Biernat	January 7, 1963	46-year old Biernat had ties to the Chicago and Milwaukee families, active in Kenosha in Wisconsin, known as a jukebox and vending machine operator, Biernat was the owner of the Lakeside Music Company which had operated at least 85 jukeboxes in bars and bowling alleys. According to the FBI, Frank Balistrieri, Steven DiSalvo and Frankie Stelloh were involved in his murder, although they were never charged in relation to the murder. It is believed Biernat had refused to pay protection money and the exchange of his vending and jukebox business as Balistrieri wished to control the vending machine and jukebox routes in Southeastern Wisconsin. Biernat was found hogtied and bludgeoned to death with three or four severe blows to the back of his head.
Louie Fazio	September 27, 1972	58-year old Fazio was a soldier in the Milwaukee family. Fazio had previously served an 12 year prison sentence from between June 1946 and June 1958 for the March 1946 murder of Mike Farina from Kenosha in Wisconsin. It is believed was Fazio was murdered on orders of Frank Balistrieri for refusing to pay higher tribute money to the Milwaukee family.
August Maniaci	September 11, 1975	66-year old Maniaci was a capo in the Milwaukee family. Maniaci was a suspect in the November 1955 murder of Jack Enea. According to FBI files, Frank Balistrieri and his underboss, Steven "Steve" DiSalvo, hired the Chicago Outfit to murder Maniaci as he had gotten himself involved in a verbal altercation with Balistrieri and was seen arguing with DiSalvo several days before his murder at a steakhouse in Milwaukee, with Charles Nicoletti and Nick "D" Andrea suspected with involvement in the Maniaci murder, on orders from Albert Tocco, Maniaci was shot 5 times in an alley near his home located on North Newhall Street on the East Side of Milwaukee in Wisconsin. Nicoletti was later gunned down in March 1977, and Andrea was beaten to death in September 1981, the murder of Maniaci remains unsolved. In September 1980, according to authorities in Milwaukee, two police officers allegedly sold the gun that killed Maniaci to Joseph "Doves" Aiuppa, the former boss of the Chicago Outfit.
August "Augie" Palmisano	June 30, 1978	49-year old Palmisano was a Milwaukee family capo. Palmisano first became associated with Joseph "Joe Camel" Caminiti as his driver, Caminiti was the consigliere of the Milwaukee family from between the late 1970s until the late 1990s, and succeeded as the boss from between the late 1990s until his death in January 2014 at the age of 87. It is believed Palmisano was killed on orders of Milwaukee family boss, Frank Balistrieri, after Palmisano openly spoke about his wish to murder Balistrieri and his brother, Peter Balistrieri, whom later became the underboss of the Milwaukee family during the early 1990s. Palmisano was killed by a car bomb inside of his 1977 Mercury Marquis in the underground parking garage of the Juneau Village Garden Apartments located on 1319 North Jackson Street in downtown Milwaukee, Wisconsin.
Maximillian "Max Adonnis" Gajewski	March 18, 1989	54-year old Gajewski was a Milwaukee family associate and formerly associated with Chicago Outfit capo Frank "Frankie the Horse" Bucceri, as an enforcer. Gajewski was shot once in the head and killed by two unidentified men at his restaurant, Giovanni's, located on 1683 N. Van Buren Street, at the corner of Van Buren and Brady Street, on Milwaukee's East Side. Prior to the March 1989 murder of Gajewski, Gajewski survived an assassination attempt in 1985 after he was stabbed in the chest by an ice pick outside of his restaurant. It is believed Gajewski was killed for feuding with several underworld figures in the Midwest of the United States.

== See also ==
- August Palmisano
