= August Palmisano =

American tavern owner killed in car bombing

- Born: August S. Palmisano; 1928
- Died: June 30, 1978 (aged 49–50); Milwaukee, Wisconsin, US
- Other names: Augie
- Occupation: Tavern owner
- Years active: 1963–1978
- Known for: Milwaukee Mafia
- Spouse: Jean Rose Lassa (m. 1952)
- Children: 4

August Palmisano (1928 – June 30, 1978), also known as Augie, was an American tavern owner. He owned Palmy's Bar, a tavern in Milwaukee, Wisconsin. Palmisano was a reputed mobster and suspected informant.

He was convicted of running gambling operations in the 1960s. He was investigated by the Federal Bureau of Investigation and had his phone wiretapped as part of a federal investigation into Mafia-controlled gambling operations. His name appeared in many federal investigations. Palmisano was killed in a car bombing in 1978.

== Personal life ==
August Palmisano (Augie) was born in 1928 to Sicilian immigrants Giovanni and Angeline Palmisano. He grew up in Milwaukee's Third Ward and attended Lincoln High School. After graduating, he went to work assisting in the management of his father's produce business, John Palmisano & Sons Wholesale Produce. Palmisano married Jean Rose née Lassa in 1952; the two bought a home in Whitefish Bay, Wisconsin and had four children: Angela, John, Patricia and Angeline.

== Career ==
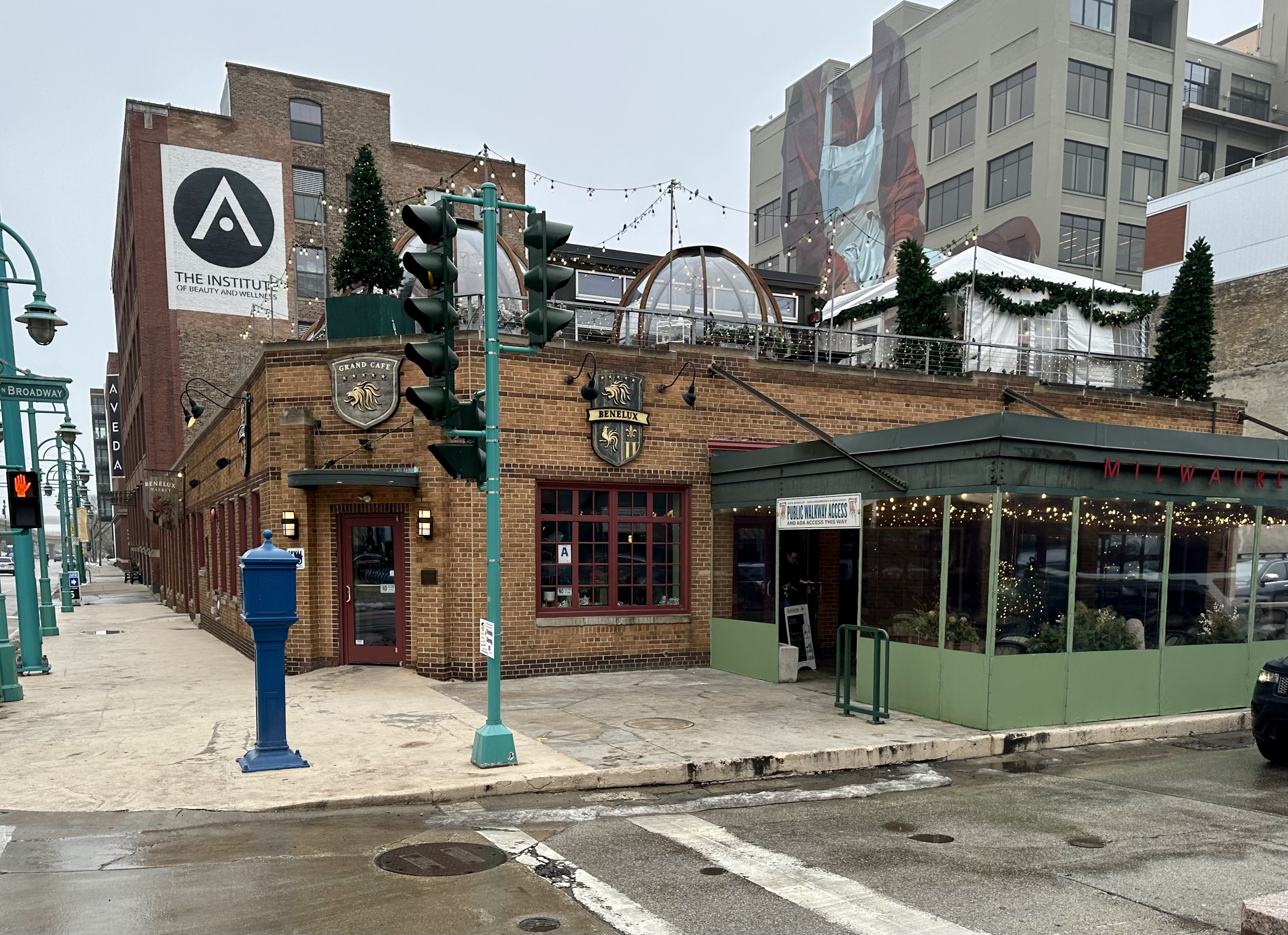
Cafe Benelux, formerly Ritchie's and Palmy's

In 1962, Palmisano and two others were arrested on bookmaking charges for taking bets on basketball games by US Marshals, the IRS, the Federal Bureau of Investigation (FBI), and the office of the United States Attorney. Bail was set at US$5,000 (equivalent to $51,975 in 2024) for each defendant; prosecutors argued for a high bail on the grounds that the defendants had a history of engaging in strong-arm tactics. Palmisano paid the bail and was released. In 1963, Palmisano was convicted at trial. He appealed the verdict, and in denying the appeal the following year, the court said the evidence against the three men was "overwhelming".

When Palmisano's father died in 1964, Palmisano renamed the business "Palmisano Produce". He continued working as a wholesaler while taking an additional job at the American Motors Corporation. He began operating a tavern in what was colloquially known as Commission Row in Milwaukee. An artist painted a picture of Palmisano with a bottle of Early Times whiskey and he intended the image to portray "the King of Commission Row".

Milwaukee Police sources described Palmisano as a "substantial figure in organized crime". Authorities suspected him of being part of the Milwaukee Mafia and the FBI set up a wiretap on Palmisano's phone. The FBI said Palmisano's name appeared in multiple investigations. Because of the investigations, some suspected him of being a police informant. In 1978, Palmisano was notified that he was one of nine Milwaukee residents subject to a police order to have their phones wiretapped as part of a federal investigation into Mafia-controlled gambling operations; Palmisano was suspected of violating his probation by continuing to run games.

Palmisano used his income to open a tavern called Ritchie's (later renamed Palmy's), using the backrooms to run illegal games of chance. FBI agents raided it in 1974, seizing US$16,339.76 (equivalent to $104,180 in 2024) in cash, US$87,380 (equivalent to $557,121 in 2024) in promise-to-pay slips, 93 sticks of dynamite, and several firearms. In 1975, he was again convicted, for "conducting a gambling business" and put on probation for two years. He was also fined $500 (equivalent to $3,188 in 2024). The charge of illegally storing 93 sticks of dynamite was dismissed as prosecutors could not prove that he had any knowledge of them.

Palmisano was known to frequent Pitch's Lounge and Restaurant in Milwaukee. On January 18, 1978, he was involved in an altercation at Pitch's with another restaurant owner named Robert Bruns, who was tackled and beaten by Palmisano and three others: Bruns was hospitalized after the attack. Two women who were shoved by Palmisano during the scuffle were also recorded as assault victims. All charges were dropped after the two women refused to testify by stating their intentions to leave town; Bruns received a cash settlement from Palmisano's lawyers.

== Death ==
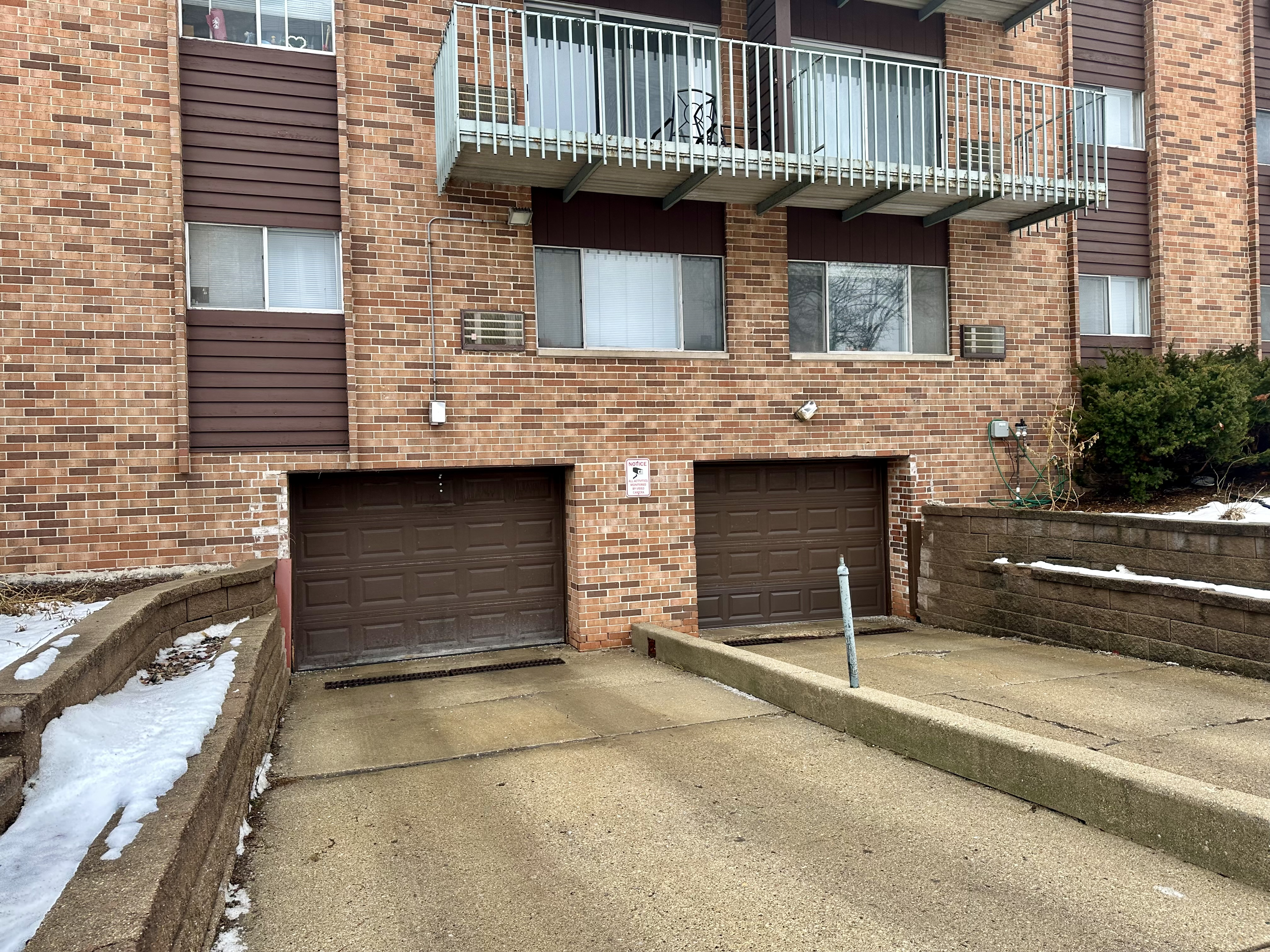
Juneau Garden Village Apartments underground parking

On the morning of June 30, 1978, Palmisano went to the underground parking of the Juneau Garden Village Apartments where he lived. When he turned the key in the ignition of his 1977 Mercury sedan, it exploded. At least 20 other vehicles were damaged and a resident said the blast was strong enough to knock pictures off the walls. Palmisano was killed; losing his right foot and face, he was identified by his fingerprints. The blast was investigated by both the FBI and the Milwaukee Police Department. Authorities determined that the bomb was placed under the hood on the driver's side of Palmisano's vehicle. Milwaukee County District Attorney E. Michael McCann said, "It certainly is gangland style, there's no question about that".

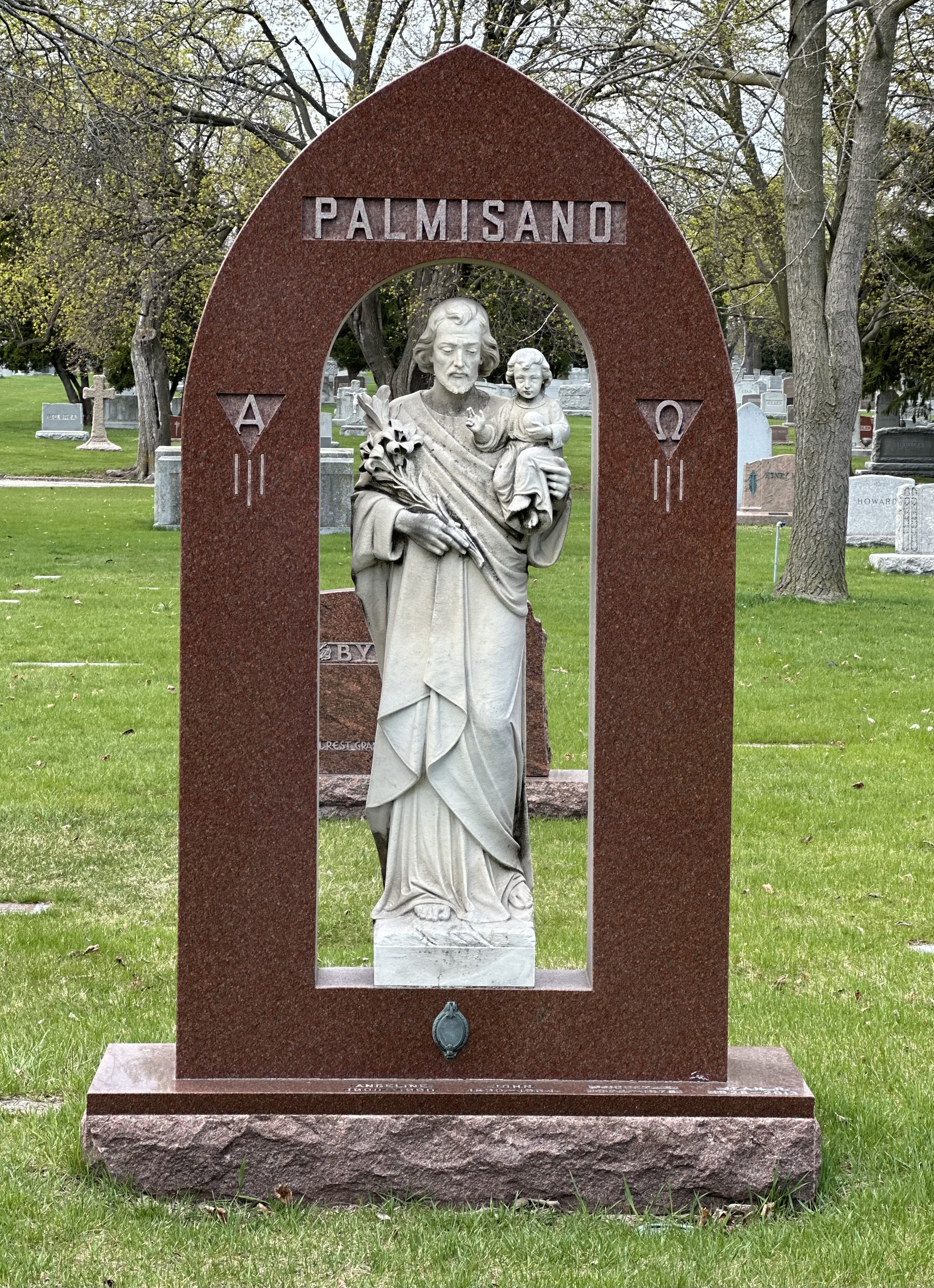
August Palmisano grave marker Holy Cross Cemetery (Milwaukee)

In August 1977, there was an attempt to bomb the car of one of Palmisano's friends. His friend Vincent J. Maniaci was not killed in the blast because the 20 sticks of dynamite did not detonate properly. In 1975 Maniaci's brother was shot and killed but the killer was never found.

Weeks after the bombing, Frank Balistrieri, the head of the Milwaukee Mafia, reportedly said, "Let me tell you what happened to a guy named Augie". Undercover FBI agent Gail Cobb reported that Balistrieri said, "He [Palmisano] was arrogant. He called me a name to my face. Now he has no skin". Balistrieri also reportedly told the agent that nobody ever survived to be a witness against him.

The Capital Times newspaper published an article with the headline "Blast Kills Convicted Milwaukee Gambler". The Kenosha News ran the headline, "Blast Victim was in Organized Crime". They quoted police sources which said Palmisano was a "victim of rivalry between organized crime factions".

The Milwaukee Sentinel reported that, less than a day after Palmisano's death, burglars forced their way into the warehouse section of the tavern and then made a hole in an internal wall. A safe in the tavern was "peeled" open and documents scattered about. (Note: Peeling a safe open involves smashing the dial and handle off of the safe, and then using a pry bar to remove the door.)
