= Frank Balistrieri =

American mobster (1918–1993)

- Frank Balistrieri
- Born: Frank Peter Balistrieri; May 27, 1918; Milwaukee, Wisconsin, U.S.
- Died: February 7, 1993 (aged 74); Milwaukee, Wisconsin, U.S.
- Other names: "Frankie Bal"; "Mr. Big"; "Mr. Slick"; "The Mad Bomber"
- Occupation: Crime boss
- Spouse: Antonina Alioto
- Children: 4
- Allegiance: Milwaukee crime family
- Convictions: Tax evasion (1971); Illegal gambling, tax evasion, and extortion (1983, 1984); Conspiracy, racketeering (1985)
- Penalty: Two years' imprisonment 13 years' imprisonment and fined $30,000 (1984); 10 years' imprisonment and fined $20,000 (1986)

Frank Peter Balistrieri (May 27, 1918 – February 7, 1993) was an American mobster who served as the boss of the Milwaukee crime family from 1961 until his death in 1993. He was a central figure in the skimming of Las Vegas casinos during the 1970s and 1980s, and served several prison sentences.

== Criminal career ==
In the late 1950s, Balistrieri married Antonina Alioto, a fellow Sicilian, and daughter of Milwaukee crime family boss John Alioto. They had four children together. In 1961, Balistrieri was installed as the new boss of the Milwaukee family, replacing the retired Alioto.

According to FBI records, in 1961, Balistrieri entered a feud with Chicago mob boss Tony Accardo, due to Balistrieri allegedly ordering the murder of nightclub operator Izzy Pogrob the prior year without Accardo's permission. FBI records also indicate that Balistrieri oversaw gambling operations in Wisconsin, and in 1963 met with syndicate members in Chicago where a deal was made that gave him control of illegal bookmaking operations in Northern Illinois.

In 1971, Balistrieri was convicted of tax evasion and was sentenced to two years in prison, in Minnesota.

Balistrieri's legitimate businesses included promoting boxing fights, distributing coin-operated devices, and owning bars, restaurants and striptease operations, including "The Scene".

In May 1974, Balistrieri met with Kansas City boss Nicholas Civella in Las Vegas, Nevada. Balistrieri also met businessman Allen Glick. Glick had recently bought the Stardust and Fremont casinos with a $62.75 million loan from the Teamsters, and had given Frank Rosenthal the job of running the casinos at the insistence of Balistrieri, who had arranged the loan for Glick.

In 1977, the FBI initiated a sting operation in Milwaukee aimed at Balistrieri. They sent Special Agent Joseph Pistone, working undercover in New York City as "Donnie Brasco", to Milwaukee to help set up a vending machine company. In 1978, the FBI named Balistrieri in a news release as a "crime leader" in Milwaukee. In 1978, August Palmisano, a convicted gambler, reputed Milwaukee mobster and suspected informant, was killed in a car bombing. Authorities attributed the bombing to Frank Balistrieri but he was never charged.

Soon Balistrieri and Civella entered a feud over each other's share from the casino skimming operations, and the two requested arbitration from The Outfit. The results of the arrangement, as ruled by Outfit leader Joseph Aiuppa and underboss Jackie Cerone, demanded that The Outfit receive a 25 percent tax as its cut in skimming operations. Balistrieri blamed Rosenthal, the Outfit representative at the Stardust Hotel, for Balistrieri's problems in Las Vegas. In 1982, Rosenthal narrowly averted death in a Las Vegas car bombing that was attributed to Balistrieri.

=== Imprisonment ===
On October 9, 1983, Balistrieri was convicted of five gambling and tax charges related to a sports betting ring that grossed at least $2,000 a day from 1977 to 1980. The investigation had included wiretapping of the Shorecrest Hotel, owned by Balistrieri's son, Joseph, and a raid on Balistrieri's house in which FBI agents knocked the front door down with a sledgehammer. On April 11, 1984, Balistrieri and his sons were convicted of attempted extortion of a vending machine business. On May 29, 1984, Balistrieri was sentenced in Milwaukee to 13 years in prison and fined $30,000. In June 1984, his sons were sentenced to eight years in prison, but the term was reduced to five years; each son, who were lawyers, had their law licenses suspended and later disbarred.

In September 1985, Balistrieri was tried in Kansas City with eight other people for skimming an estimated $2 million of the gross income of the Argent Corporation casino operations. On January 1, 1986, Balistrieri pleaded guilty to one count of conspiracy and one count of racketeering, and was sentenced to 10 years in prison and fined $20,000, with this sentence to run concurrently with his 13-year sentence from 1984.

== Death ==
On November 5, 1991, Balistrieri was released early from prison due to poor health. In December 1992, Balistrieri was admitted to St. Mary's Hospital (now Columbia St. Mary's) in Milwaukee, reportedly for colon surgery. Balistrieri died at the age of 74, on February 7, 1993, in Milwaukee.
