= Frank T. Caruso =

American mobster (1911–1983)

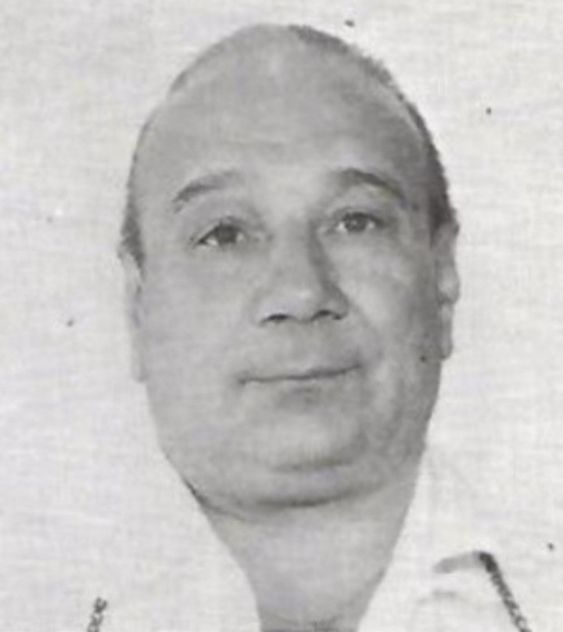
Frank Tony Caruso

Frank T. "Skids" Caruso (December 26, 1911 – December 31, 1983) was a Chicago mobster and crime boss involved in illegal gambling and racketeering activities for the Chicago Outfit criminal organization during the 1950s.

Originally from Chicago's Near North Side (known as "The Patch"), his relatives include brother Joseph (Joe Shoes), including his brother-in-law First Ward alderman Fred Roti, and sons Bruno Caruso and Frank M. “Toots” Caruso. As a youth, Caruso ran with the infamous Forty-Two Gang, which included future gangsters such as Sam "Momo" Giancana.

Starting in 1935, Caruso amassed a criminal record of at least 13 arrests on charges including grand larceny, illegal gambling and conspiracy. In 1956, on the death of his father-in-law, Bruno Roti, Caruso became the owner of several South Side, Chicago casinos and became the head of the 26th Street/Chinatown "crew". Caruso now became involved in illegal gambling in Chicago's First Ward. On the side, Caruso operated a legitimate business, Caruso Plumbing, in the Chicago suburb of Hillside, Illinois. In 1983, Caruso died of natural causes.
