= Frank Zito =

Italian-American mobster (1893–1974)

- Born: Francesco Zito; February 24, 1893; San Giuseppe Jato, Sicily, Italy
- Died: August 22, 1974 (aged 81); Springfield, Illinois
- Citizenship: United States
- Years active: c.1920s–c.1970s
- Status: Released 1935
- Criminal charges: Violations of the 18th amendment
- Penalty: Two years in Leavenworth Federal Prison, $10,000 fine

Francesco "Frank" Zito (February 24, 1893 – August 22, 1974) was a Sicilian-American mobster who controlled criminal activities in Central and Southern Illinois for over twenty years, providing protection from law enforcement and rival competitors from his base of operations in Springfield, Illinois. It can be debated if Zito was head of his own crime family or, he may have been a powerful capo of the Chicago Outfit with his own crew based in Central Illinois. This information is unclear and it seems as though the files on Mr. Zito lack the investigatory evidence that he was in fact the "Godfather of the Prairie." In any case, Zito was a very powerful force in Springfield and the Central and Southern areas of Illinois.

== Early life ==
Born in San Giuseppe Jato, Sicily, Zito immigrated to Illinois in 1910, according to later testimony before a Congressional investigating committee, separate from his parents, Giuseppe and Lorenza, and at least three of 11 other brothers. Two of his brothers, Sam and Frank Zito, also had criminal backgrounds after arriving. Sam was charged with extortion in 1914 and Frank was charged with murder - though never convicted - in 1915.

== Criminal life ==
During prohibition, Zito became involved in bootlegging, prostitution, and illegal gambling. During this period, Zito was convicted of violating federal liquor laws. Based in Springfield, Illinois, Zito and the St. Louis crime syndicate ran illegal gambling and drug trafficking operations in rural Illinois. While attending the 1957 Apalachin Conference in Apalachin, New York, Zito was captured with numerous other mobsters when the New York State Police raided the meeting. Although indicted in a federal investigation into organized crime in the Midwest, Zito remained in power into the 1970s.

On August 22, 1974, Frank Zito died of natural causes.
