= Fiore Buccieri =

American mobster

Fiore "Fifi" Buccieri (December 16, 1907 – August 17, 1973) was a Chicago mobster and member of the Chicago Outfit who specialized in loansharking.

== Early years ==
As a youth he was a member of the Chicago 42 Gang with future Outfit boss Sam "Momo" Giancana. He was the brother of mobster Frank Buccieri. During the 1920s, the two men worked as gunmen for future Outfit boss Al Capone. In 1925, Buccieri was arrested for the first time on concealed weapons charge. During the bootleg wars of Prohibition, Buccieri was reportedly involved in at least 10 gangland slayings. In the 1960s, following Giancana's rise to the day-to-day "boss" position in the Outfit, Buccieri served as a top enforcer and personal hitman. He was also involved in labor racketeering bombing, arson and loan sharking.

According to one source Buccieri was one of the gunmen, along with Paul Labriola and Vicent Ioli, who were invovled in the 1946 kidnapping of Ed Jones, while Lenny Caifano and future boss Sam Giancana were the getaway drivers.

== Top Loanshark ==
As a loan shark, Buccieri would send his men to stake out employment offices. These thugs would pass out business cards to the unemployed that listed Buccieri as a, "loan officer." The mob generally viewed unemployed workers as poor loan prospects; however, Buccieri was so effective at intimidating his "juice," or "loan interest," victims that they would steal or rob to pay him off. Buccieri would often warn friends of a "juice" victim not to ride around with him, "because he is going to get hit." When the victim heard this warning, he would quickly pay up.

Buccieri, along with Jackie "The Lackey" Cerone, James "Turk" Torello, Samuel "Mad Sam" DeStefano and Dave Yaras participated in the infamous torture murder of loanshark William "Action" Jackson. The Outfit suspected Jackson of stealing its money and working for the Federal Bureau of Investigation (FBI) as an informant. The 300-pound Jackson was hung on a meat hook and tortured with ice picks, baseball bats, a blow torch and an electric cattle prod. This ordeal went on for three days, until Jackson finally died of shock. Federal authorities later obtained details of Jackson's murder from conversations overheard between Buccieri and Cerone. As it turned out, Jackson was not an FBI informant.

While in Miami in January 1962, Buccieri was recorded by the FBI in an electronic eavesdropping operation discussing the proposed killing of Frank Esposito with his fellow mobsters Jackie Cerone, David Yaras and Jimmy Torello. The Florida authorities were subsequently tipped off.

== Later years ==
The subject of later federal investigations, Buccieri was dubbed by federal agents, "the lord high executioner," in 1966. Buccieri's 62nd birthday celebration, attended by hundreds of mobsters from Chicago and around the nation, was observed by both federal and local police. They suspected that the party was a front for a mob summit meeting in which Giancana officially took over the Outfit from Anthony Accardo, which might have been an erroneous thought at some level, because Giancana has just spent the previous 12 months in federal prison and got booted that year as The Outfit's top day-to-day boss after getting out of prison, taking over the top spot nine years earlier.

In 1973, Fiore Buccieri died of cancer. In 1975, Giancana was murdered in his home. Some authorities speculated that the mob would not have ordered Giancana's death if Buccieri were still alive and acting as his bodyguard.
