= Giovanni Bucchieri =

- Born: Linköping, Sweden
- Genres: Dancehall, hip hop, classical music, indie progressive pop, gothic rock, electronica, krautrock
- Occupations: Choreographer, Filmmaker, Musician, Actor, Dancer and Photographer
- Label: Sister productions
- Website: giovannibucchieri.com

Giovanni Bucchieri is a dancer and musician from Linköping, Sweden. He established himself early as a prolific dancer, specialised in breakdance and in Street dance.

At the age of 15 he moved to Stockholm. Together with his longtime companion Aleksander Maksic he traveled to New York at the age of 16. It was here that Bucchieri's love for Vogue was discovered, at various ballroom dances.

Bucchieri was educated at the Ballet Academy of the Opera of Stockholm and at the Royal Dramatic Theatre ́s acting school. He was a dancer at the Royal Swedish Ballet and in the Cullberg Ballet, where he danced the Prince in Mats Ek's Sleeping beauty and Romeo in Birgit Cullberg's Romeo and Juliet. He also was a dancer and actor in the acclaimed choreographer Pontus Lidberg's movies The Rain (2008) and the Labyrinth Within (2011) together with New York City ballet's star Wendy Whelan. In 2010 Bucchieri choreographed his first dance work for Stockholm 59 degree North 1 ballet Cantus: In memory of the dancing queen. "The work is a somber and stylised reflexion of human relationships, effectively accompanied by Bach’s Passion According to St Matthew by J.S Bach, reinterpreted electronically." "Cantus in memory of the dancing queen is somber from the beginning to end, but its refined aesthetics render it subtle than cumbersome." It possesses a stamp of decadence, the requiem of a dream (the end of a career). One senses that the spell has faded and that it is time for the next way for the Grande Dame to appear. In this rendition of "dancing queen" one sees much of the qualities of Barbara (her passion and fatalism) and of the heroines out of such Pedro Almodóvar films as Todo sobre mi madre."

On 27 April, Bucchieri’s piece "Come you daughters" premiered at the Royal Swedish Opera (together with Alexander Ekman and Pontus Lidberg). "The greatest surprise is Giovanni Bucchieri’s "Come you daughters", which is performed by five dancers with Nadja Sellrup as the main character. Here is suddenly a work that have the courage to challenge and put demands on the audience. Bucchieri lets his highly fragmented choreography crash right into Johann Sebastian Bach's tightly woven Matthäus-Passion. To the point that even that is fragmented, and a sudden uncertainty occurs, an uncertainty that makes the entire empty stage vibrate. The minimalistic choreography and the vast empty stage really gives the dancers the possibility to perform."

"The dance follows the music and the cuts between Bach and Dolly Parton sharpens the composition, knocks one sideways and raises questions. Questions about death, of cause, but also about the darkness of the living."
