= Frank Buccieri =

American mobster

- Born: 23 January 1919
- Died: 8 March 2004 (aged 85)
- Other names: Frank Russo, Big Frank
- Occupations: Mobster, business manager (illegal gambling, loansharking)
- Years active: 1960s–1980s
- Known for: Heading mob operations on the West Coast of the United States; brother of Fiore "Fifi" Buccieri
- Relatives: Fiore Buccieri (brother)
- Status: Deceased
- Allegiance: Chicago Outfit; Lucchese crime family
- Criminal charges: Petty larceny (1936)

Frank "The Horse" Buccieri (January 23, 1919 – March 8, 2004), also known as "Frank Russo" or "Big Frank", was an American mobster who headed mob operations on the West Coast of the United States during the 1970s and 1980s. He was the brother of Outfit hitman Fiore "Fifi" Buccieri.

In 1936, the 17-year-old Buccieri was arraigned in a Chicago court on charges of petty larceny. When judge said that he was going to send the charges to a grand jury, Buccieri's brother Fiore asked if the family could punish him instead. The judge agreed and one of Buccieri's relatives gave him five lashes with a doubled five-foot length of rubber hose. This would be Buccieri's only arrest in a lifetime of crime. During the 1960s, Buccieri was a business manager for illegal gambling and loansharking operations on Chicago's West Side.

In the late 1970s, Buccieri bought a home in Palm Springs, California.

In June 1981, the New York-based Mafia Commission appointed Buccieri to run its criminal operations in California. Buccieri succeeded mobster Frank "The Bomp" Bompensiero, who had been murdered, and Tommy Ricciardi. Buccieri was reportedly assigned a capo, or captain, from the New York Lucchese crime family to help in the day-to-day operations in California. One investigator explained, "The Commission wanted someone they could trust to handle the lucrative California rackets and this time they wanted to make sure nothing went wrong."

On March 8, 2004, Frank Buccieri died of natural causes.
