= Meat hook =

Hook normally used in butcheries to hang meat

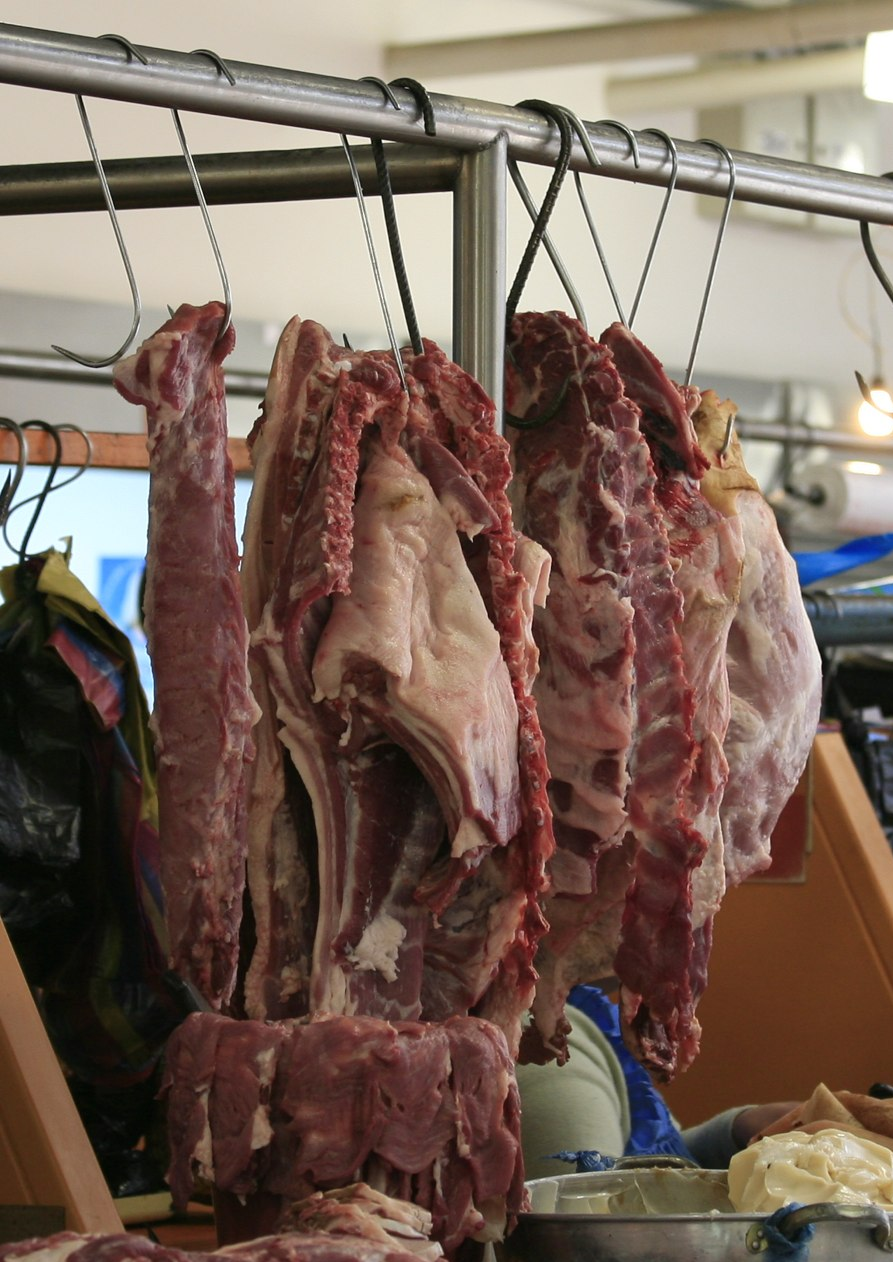
Meat hanging from S-type meat hooks.

A meat hook is any hook normally used in butcheries to hang meat. This form of hook is a variation on the classic S hook.

== Types ==
- An S-shaped hook or jointed hook is used to hang up meat or the carcasses of animals such as pigs and cattle on a moving conveyor line. The jointed hook is able to swivel, allowing the carcass to be turned more easily.
- A gambrel hook or stick is a frame (shaped like a horse's hind leg) with hooks for suspending a carcass in a more spread out fashion.
- A grip hook is a single hook with a handle of some kind, to hold on to a carcass while butchering.
- A bacon hook or bacon hanger is a multi-pronged coat-hanger type hook, used to hang bacon joints and other meat.
