= Joseph Glimco =

Italian-American mobster and labor leader

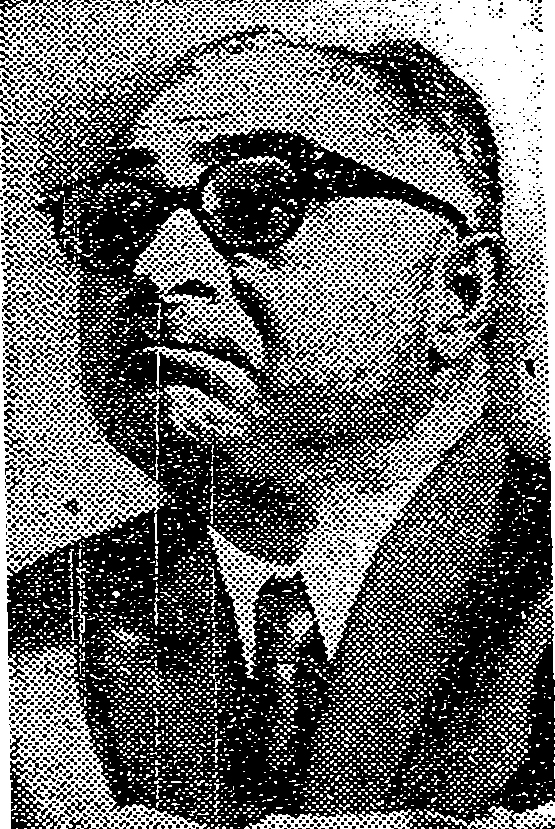
- Glimco testifies before the U.S. Senate, April 24, 1958 (Note: Press reports accompanying this image (as well as later historical discussions of the event) depicted Glimco variously as pugnacious, obstinate, arrogant, defensive, and smug. The image clearly conveys visually Glimco's behavior toward the United States Senators and Select Committee Chief Counsel Robert F. Kennedy.)
- Born: Giuseppe Glielmi; January 14, 1909; Campagna, Campania, Kingdom of Italy
- Died: April 28, 1991 (aged 82); Berwyn, Illinois, U.S.
- Resting place: Queen of Heaven Cemetery, Hillside, Illinois, U.S.
- Other names: Joey Glimco; Tough Guy Glimco; Joseph Glinico; Joseph Glielmi; Joey Clinco; Little Tim Murphy
- Citizenship: American (1943-1991)
- Occupations: Gangster, labor racketeer
- Organization: International Brotherhood of Teamsters
- Spouse: Lena Pierini (m. 1932)
- Children: 2
- Relatives: Gus Alex (brother-in-law)
- Allegiance: Chicago Outfit
- Criminal charges: Conspiracy, racketeering (1954)

Joseph Paul Glimco (born Giuseppe Glielmi; Italian pronunciation: [dʒuˈzɛppe ˌʎɛlmi]; January 14, 1909 – April 28, 1991) was an Italian-American labor leader and well-known organized crime figure based in Chicago. He was considered "Chicago's top labor racketeer" in the 1950s. One high-ranking Chicago Teamsters leader noted in 1954, "He is the mob. When he opens his mouth, it's the syndicate talking". Glimco was active in the International Brotherhood of Teamsters (IBT) and a close associate of Teamsters president Jimmy Hoffa. He was a capo in the Chicago Outfit, an organized crime syndicate, and oversaw the syndicate's labor racketeering efforts. He worked closely with Tony "Joe Batters" Accardo, who led the Chicago Outfit from 1943 to 1957, and Sam "Momo" Giancana, who led the syndicate from 1957 to 1966. A United States Senate committee once claimed that Glimco ran "the nation's most corrupt union".

Among his numerous aliases were Joey Glimco, Tough Guy Glimco, Joseph Glinico, Joseph Glielmi, and Joey Clinco. He was also known as "Little Tim" Murphy, a reference to Timothy "Big Tim" Murphy, a Chicago mobster and labor racketeer (also well known for his close ties to the Teamsters) whom the Chicago Outfit feared and subsequently murdered in 1928.

== Early life ==
Glimco was born Giuseppe Glielmi in Puglietta, a frazione of the town of Campagna in the Province of Salerno, Campania in Italy, in 1909, and emigrated to the United States with his family in 1913, settling in Chicago. He had two brothers, including Frank, and a sister. Glimco attended public school but quit after the seventh grade to earn a living as a shoeshiner and newspaper delivery boy. He owned two newsstands when he was 20 years old. Glimco's criminal career began about the same time as his departure from school. By the time he was 18, he had been arrested five times and convicted twice for disorderly conduct and once for larceny (receiving six months to a year's probation each time). By the time he was 25, he had been arrested another 16 times—including arrests for murder (twice), bootlegging (twice), motor vehicle theft, criminal intimidation, bombing, and public brawling.

In 1932, he married Lena Pierini, an Italian-American woman, and they had a son; Joseph Jr., and a daughter, Jo Anne Kosey. His brother Frank married Dona Alex, the sister of Gus Alex, a hitman for Chicago Outfit financial and legal advisor Jake "Greasy Thumb" Guzik (who oversaw the Outfit's bribes to police and politicians and ensured that income due to the Outfit was not skimmed by lower level mobsters).

Around the time of his marriage, Glimco became an associate of important Chicago Outfit leaders Tony Accardo and Louis "Little New York" Campagna. Campagna became Glimco's "mob patron", helping to guide his decisions and actions and keep him out of law enforcement trouble.

Glimco applied to become a naturalized U.S. citizen in November 1931, but his application was turned down in November 1932 due to his extensive criminal record. He applied again in June 1938, and was denied for the same reasons in July 1939. He applied a final time in 1940, and his petition was approved in 1943.

== Organized crime and labor activities ==
Glimco had an extensive career as a labor racketeer in the 1930s. By 1930, he had become an established "labor slugger", assaulting or threatening to assault union members or employers in order to help organized crime gain control of labor unions. One of his chief soldiers was Dominic Senese. (Note: Senese was a mob enforcer who himself would later rise high in both the Teamsters and the Chicago Outfit, and in 1988 would become the victim of a notorious attempted gangland murder, which he survived.) Probably his first assignment was to help the Chicago Outfit run the Commission Drivers Union, IBT. Soon thereafter, Glimco became a protégé of William J. "Witt" Hanley, secretary-treasurer of the Produce, Fresh & Frozen Fruits & Vegetables, Fish, Butter, Eggs, Cheese & Poultry Drivers Union, Local 703, IBT. Hanley had strong mob ties, and Local 703 president William "Klondike" O'Donnell was a notorious gangster. Glimco became the "office manager" for the Poultry Handlers Union, IBT, in 1933, organizer for the Poultry Handlers in 1937, and later an organizer for the Poultry Drivers and the Fish Handlers & Filleters unions as well. Both locals were part of the Amalgamated Meat Cutters and Butcher Workmen national union. Among his frequent associates were a number of other labor leaders and staff with strong ties to organized crime. (Note: These associates included: Max Podolsky (mob-backed business agent for the Poultry Handlers Union), Jack Perno (mob-backed secretary of the Fish Handlers & Filleters Union, Local 550, Amalgamated Meat Cutters), labor slugger Victor Comforte, Michael J. Raimondi (mob-backed secretary-treasurer of Local 703), Daniel Colucio (mob-backed secretary-treasurer of Notions, Candies, Cigars, Tobacco, and Cigaret Salesmen, Drivers, Helpers and Inside Workers and Vending Machine Drivers, Service Men, and Inside Workers Union, Local 761, IBT), and Edward "Red" Donovan (mob-backed Film, Radio, Television, Orchestra, Studio, Theatrical, Exhibition, Amusement Park, & Sound Truck Chauffeurs, Helpers and Warehousemen, Local 755, IBT).) Glimco was overseeing the extortion of the city's Fulton Street and Randolph Street poultry dealers by 1934, and two years later was such a prominent labor racketeer that the Chicago Tribune named him one of Al Capone's chief soldiers. After Capone went to prison in 1931, Glimco openly associated with the titular head of the Chicago mob, Frank Nitti (a relationship that only ended with Nitti's suicide in 1943).

In 1940, Hanley brought Glimco to see Dominic Abata, founder of the taxi drivers' division of Local 777, IBT (which represented many Chicago taxicab drivers). Hanley told Abata to put Glimco on the payroll; intimidated, Abata made Glimco the division's executive director. After Hanley's death in 1944, Glimco began to take over a larger number of the labor rackets in Chicago. He also started to exercise more active control of Taxi Drivers Local 777 as well as the Produce Drivers union. In 1944, Glimco was elected secretary-treasurer of Local 777, and in 1950 became the local's sole pension and welfare fund trustee.

== Growing Teamsters connections and mob influence ==
Glimco's influence spread within the mob and the Chicago labor movement beginning in 1950. That year, Glimco made a strong push to take over the Chicago Federation of Labor, terrorizing influential local labor leaders with repeated bombings and drive-by shootings. Glimco forced Abata out of Local 777 in 1951 by making death threats against him, his wife, and his children, replaced him with cab driver Joe Coca, and in 1952 was employed by the local as a negotiator. He was also elected a delegate to the Chicago Federation of Labor, the Illinois Federation of Labor, and Teamsters Joint Council of Chicago. Through most of the 1950s Glimco was considered "Chicago's top labor racketeer". One top Chicago Teamsters leader noted in 1954, "He is the mob. When he opens his mouth, it's the syndicate talking". Federal law enforcement officials, who had been investigating Glimco since 1943, agreed: "We are investigating Glimco because he represents the syndicate". Glimco attended a meeting of top Chicago Outfit leaders at the home of Tony Accardo in April 1952, and a meeting of the Outfit's top labor racketeers at the home of Murray "The Camel" Humphreys (who supervised the Outfit's labor activities) in 1953. Humphreys was pushed out of active involvement in most organized crime activities in 1954 due to failing eyesight, and Glimco was named his successor. The Chicago Crime Commission estimated Glimco's income from union salaries, businesses, kickbacks, and extortion payoffs to be $70,000 a month after this takeover. His legitimate business interests (many of which began in 1952) included a chemical company, several laundries, a phonograph record distributor, and a number of jukebox leasing firms.

Glimco was also wielded increasing power in the Teamsters union. In 1952, he switched sides and threw the support of a large block of Chicago delegates' votes behind the candidacy of Dave Beck, who was challenging incumbent Teamsters President Daniel Tobin for the union's presidency. The following year, Glimco—controlling about 25 percent of the votes in the race for the Teamsters Joint Council of Chicago—orchestrated the defeat of the incumbent president and his slate of three council members and installed his own candidates in office. (Note: In the International Brotherhood of Teamsters, local unions in large cities often form a federation known as a Joint Council to coordinate their collective bargaining, lobbying, political, and other affairs. Officers and members of the Joint Council are elected by delegates from each local union. Delegates are awarded to each local proportionally on the basis of the number of members in that local.)

Glimco's support of Beck was not strong, however. Glimco began supporting up-and-coming Teamsters official Jimmy Hoffa in the late 1940s. Hoffa was expanding his political base within the Teamsters in preparation for an attempt to unseat incumbent Teamsters President Dave Beck. Hoffa needed to control the delegate-rich locals in Chicago, and to do that he needed Glimco's permission to infiltrate and dominate them. Through his relationship with Paul "Red" Dorfman, president of the Chicago Waste Handlers Union and an associate of Tony Accardo's, Hoffa became a close friend to Glimco and Paul "The Waiter" Ricca. Glimco brokered the deal in which the Chicago Outfit supported Hoffa's organizing drives among Midwestern drivers in exchange for Glimco's access to Local 777's finances. Glimco's actions positioned him to support either man: If Beck won, Glimco's actions in 1952 proved his allegiance to Beck. If Hoffa won, Glimco would have played a critical role in his success.

== Legal troubles ==
Glimco began having legal troubles in 1954. Law enforcement officials first tried to connect him with the slaying of Charles "Cherry Nose" Gioe on August 19, 1954. According to police, Glimco had allegedly ordered the bombing of a Howard Johnson's restaurant at 4240 North Harlem Avenue in Norridge, Illinois, on May 18, 1954, in an attempt to force the construction contractor to employ union labor (specifically, a labor union dominated by Glimco). Gioe, a top Chicago Outfit underboss recently released from prison, ordered Glimco to end his dispute with the contractor and Glimco allegedly had Gioe murdered for this interference in his business. But the investigation ended without any action taken against Glimco.

The Gioe investigation led to a major press expose and additional legal actions against Glimco. On August 30, 1954, the Chicago Daily Tribune began running a six-part series exposing Glimco's criminal past, mob ties, and infiltration of the Chicago labor movement. "Glimco was well on his way to take over the teamsters unions" until the Daily Tribune series exposed him and put a halt to his plans. A grand jury investigation, prompted by the Daily Tribune series, opened two days later, and Glimco was indicted on charges of conspiracy and racketeering under the Hobbs Act. Glimco challenged the constitutionality of the Hobbs Act and claimed the statute of limitations had run out, assertions the government contested. The bad press and indictment led the Teamsters international headquarters to conduct two probes into Glimco's union activities, both of which exonerated him of any wrongdoing. A lengthy legal investigation followed the indictment, during which Glimco associates and other witnesses refused to testify, Glimco was alleged to have bribed police to avoid prosecution, and Glimco's legal team made repeated legal motions which delayed the trial for significant periods of time. After a 12-day trial, Glimco was acquitted of all charges on March 26, 1957. Meanwhile, three more federal grand juries began investigating Glimco, looking into additional racketeering charges, his juke box leasing businesses, and the finances of the Fish Handlers & Filleters union.

Glimco was elected president of Local 777 on March 10, 1958.

Just a month earlier, however, the United States Senate Select Committee on Improper Activities in Labor and Management subpoenaed Glimco as part of its investigation into labor racketeering. The Senate Labor and Public Welfare Committee had investigated Glimco's stewardship of the Local 777 pension and welfare fund in 1954 but never developed enough evidence to prove wrongdoing. But the Daily Tribune exposé and additional Senate investigations in 1957 led to a new focus on him. The committee also subpoenaed Glimco's personal financial records, Local 777's financial and other records, and the Local 777 pension and welfare fund's financial and other records. Glimco initially refused to turn over the records but would let the Select Committee view them in his presence, and then claimed that he had no personal records. When the records were turned over, they were incomplete and Glimco did not stand guard over them day and night as he had pledged. During his testimony before the Select Committee on April 24, Glimco asserted his Fifth Amendment right against self-incrimination 80 times. Select Committee Chairman Senator John Little McClellan and Chief Counsel Robert F. Kennedy exchanged sharp words with Glimco:

Kennedy: And you defraud the union by charging the construction of your own home to the union, just like Mr. Dave Beck?
Glimco: I respectfully decline to answer because I honestly believe my answer might intend to incriminate me.
Kennedy: I would agree with you.
McClellan: I believe it would.
Kennedy: You haven't got the guts to answer, have you, Mr. Glimco?
Glimco: I respectfully decline to answer because I honestly believe my answer might intend to incriminate me.
McClellan: Morally, you are kind of yellow inside, are you not?
Glimco: I respectfully decline to answer because I honestly believe my answer might intend to incriminate me.

The Select Committee also investigated the union contracts Glimco negotiated (which the committee felt were sweetheart deals) in June 1958, and Glimco's alleged domination of various Teamster unions in July 1958. But despite this extensive investigation and intense public questioning, however, Glimco was never prosecuted for these allegations.

The Select Committee hearings lead to additional investigations into Glimco's activities, however. Committee investigators looked into Glimco's jukebox businesses, and eventually named him "boss of the jukebox rackets" in early 1959. Despite a grand jury probe which identified Glimco as the owner of the biggest jukebox racket in the region, Glimco was never indicted. It was later alleged that he bribed witnesses to avoid indictment, but was never prosecuted on these charges. On March 11, 1959, the Select Committee held a week-long hearing into Glimco's union affairs, during which witnesses said they had been threatened, assaulted, and intimidated by him and his associates; that they had signed over portions of their wages to him in order to avoid assault; that he had extorted money from businesses and union members alike; that he had bribed witnesses to avoid prosecution and/or imprisonment; and that he had signed sweetheart deals with employers. Glimco testified before the Select Committee for the second time on March 12, 1959, but repeatedly invoked his Fifth Amendment rights again and again. During the hearings, investigators discovered that Glimco's police records had been destroyed by the Chicago police in 1949 at the request of State Representative Andrew A. Euzzino of Chicago, and that many of the records relating to earlier investigations into Glimco's alleged racketeering were missing.

The 1959 Select Committee hearings did reveal, however, that Glimco had used union monies to fund his legal defense efforts—money Senators and committee investigators said constituted income which Glimco did not report to the Internal Revenue Service. These few facts would later become important in convicting Glimco on tax evasion charges in 1968.

== NLRB challenge and legal battles ==
Although Glimco's legal troubles appeared to be ending by mid-1959, his union troubles were just beginning. In 1947, Congress enacted the Taft–Hartley Act over President Harry S. Truman's veto. The Taft-Hartley Act created legal standards which labor unions must meet regarding representation elections, coercing employees, strikes and picketing, and other actions; violation of these standards constitutes an unfair labor practice (ULP), and employees and workers can file ULPs against unions with the National Labor Relations Board (NLRB) for redress. In October 1958, a member of Local 777's taxicab drivers' union filed a ULP against Glimco for depriving him of the full amount due him by the union's pension and welfare fund and for inducing the man's employer to discharge him for requesting the full amount. Although the worker later received full reimbursement and reinstatement, the NLRB took the unheard-of step of refusing to drop the charges. The welfare fund ULP led to a widespread investigation into Glimco's stewardship of the union's pension, welfare, and insurance funds. In March 1959, two union trustees were accused of awarding union insurance business to a firm controlled by the mob and which charged excessive commissions. Teamsters President Jimmy Hoffa was forced to publicly support Glimco even as state law enforcement officials began a formal criminal investigation. On March 20, 1959, the Occidental Life Insurance Company removed Glimco as disbursing and certifying official in charge of the Local 777 welfare fund. Glimco voided the insurance policy on April 17 after he failed to regain control of the fund from Occidental Life. He was immediately sued by union members, who sought to restore the welfare fund. Glimco sued Occidental Life, and won a $54,000 judgment against the company in August 1960 for violating its contract with the union.

The fight over the union funds led to a battle by union members to oust Glimco. Even though he had been under a 24-hour police guard since August 1958, Dominic Abata announced he was leading an effort to oust the Teamsters as the union representing Chicago's taxicab drivers. Abata's supporters were assaulted even though they were ostensibly under police protection, which led to charges of police corruption, a civil lawsuit seeking a court injunction against further violence, and a number of ULP charges filed by members against Glimco. On May 12, Abata's group, the Democratic Union Organizing Committee (DUOC), filed union representation petitions with the NLRB asking for elections to be held to determine which union (DUOC or the Teamsters) would continue to represent the drivers and mechanics at Yellow Cab Company and Checker Cab.

The subsequent representation election campaign was a violent one. Widespread assaults, bombings, shootings, arson, and threats were made against DUOC's leaders and supporters in what the press called a "wave of terror". Glimco sued in mid-June to block the election, but both the NLRB and the federal courts refused to do so. Abata won an NLRB hearing on whether to hold the election. But the first day of the hearings (on June 24, 1959) became "one of the wildest hearings in labor history": So many cab drivers attended the hearing that downtown traffic was snarled all day, so many people attended that the hearing had to be switch to a hotel ballroom and then a federal courthouse to maintain order, Glimco's supporters disrupted the proceedings by shouting through bullhorns, and Senate Select Committee investigators served subpoenas on Glimco staff members (who couldn't flee through the crowd to avoid the U.S. Marshals). A greater sense of decorum was observed over the next several weeks as DUOC witnesses testified about the alleged violence and intimidation aimed at them as they sought to oust the Glimco-led Teamsters union. The hearings adjourned for several weeks in July while Abata and Glimco testified at the Senate Select Committee again. On August 13, as the NLRB hearings continued, court-appointed monitors for the Teamsters union ordered Jimmy Hoffa to fire Joey Glimco on grounds of corruption. (Note: In September 1957, several members of the Teamsters sued Teamsters General Secretary-Treasurer John F. English alleging that their legal rights under the Teamsters' 1952 constitution were being violated and that the Teamsters leadership's legal obligation to protect these rights were being repudiated. In a consent decree signed on January 31, 1958, the Teamsters union agreed to the imposition of a neutral, independent team of outside monitors who would oversee the union, investigate allegations of corruption and the violation of union members' rights, and impose solutions, among other rights and powers.) The following day, a draft NLRB report (stemming from the original 1958 welfare fund ULP) requesting the issuance of numerous ULPs against Glimco and Local 777 was leaked to the press. Hoffa refused to fire Glimco, and the Board of Monitors went to U.S. federal court on August 25 to enforce their order. On September 2, the monitors revised their order, reiterating their demand that Glimco be immediately fired and adding demands that Glimco lose his Teamster membership and forfeit funds, and that Hoffa conduct an immediate investigation into and an audit of Local 777's funds. Glimco defiantly predicted he would never be fired. Hoffa defied the Board of Monitors, refusing to expel Glimco from the union. In fact, even after a year had passed, Hoffa had yet to act on the order to expel Glimco.

The battle at the NLRB dragged on through the fall of 1959. Glimco expelled a number of DUOC supporters from the union in late September despite the passage of the Labor Management Reporting and Disclosure Act (the LMRDA, or Landrum-Griffin Act) on September 14, 1959, generally forbidding the denial of union members' rights on political grounds. DUOC's attack on Glimco suffered another setback when the NLRB headquarters ruled on September 21 that testimony presented at the Senate Select Committee hearings could not be entered into evidence at the regional NLRB hearings in Chicago. Even as additional evidence of illegal actions by Glimco to stall an election and swing votes his way emerged, the NLRB's regional office blocked attempts to further stall the agency's hearings and said its final ruling would come in January 1960. The agency also said it would hold hearings on the ULPs in the union funds cases in December and issue a ruling in three months. Even as the NRLB hearings on a potential election continued, Glimco called for union elections in which he ran for president unopposed and handily won on December 5, 1959.

Meanwhile, the Board of Monitors continued to press its case in court to force Hoffa to expel Glimco from the Teamsters. The monitors won favorable rulings from both the district court and the D.C. Circuit Court of Appeals. On November 16, 1959, the U.S. Supreme Court refused to hear Hoffa's appeal, and the Board of Monitors pledged to move immediately to force Glimco out.

As Glimco fought the NLRB and DUOC for control of the union, he also faced additional legal challenges. An Illinois grand jury began investigating him for perjury in September 1959, and two indictments were handed down on September 26. Glimco pleaded not guilty, and attempted to quash the indictment but was unsuccessful. Jury selection began in April, the jury was sequestered after being seated, and the trial began on June 27. The jury found Glimco not guilty on June 30, 1960. As the perjury trial wore on, Glimco was investigated yet again for racketeering in the jukebox distribution industry but no charges were filed against him.

The dispute over holding a union representation election continued at the NLRB throughout 1960. The NLRB subpoenaed Local 777 records as part of its investigation, and Glimco refused to turn them over even after a court ordered him to do so. As the NLRB heard additional evidence about violence directed at DUOC supporters (including graphic photos of beatings) and the Chicago Police Department opened a new investigation into the sabotage of taxicabs driven by DUOC members, the labor board halted further hearings pending receipt of records and gave Glimco a lengthy extension of time to submit these records (despite vigorous protests from U.S. Department of Labor and DUOC attorneys). The hearings ended on March 11, 1960, when Glimco advised the NLRB that he would not turn over any records.

After a three-month lull in the NLRB's activities, NLRB attorneys filed a brief with the Board accusing Glimco of having coerced taxicab drivers into joining the union and paying dues. The NLRB's investigator said Glimco had colluded with Yellow Cab and Checker Cab to negotiate and enforce closed shop clauses in its collective bargaining agreements in violation of the Taft-Hartley Act. The investigator alleged that between $125,000 and $650,000 in dues were illegally collected, and demanded that Glimco refund these dues immediately. The 125-page brief led to a second investigation (this time into the making of loans out of union funds to local leaders in violation of the Landrum-Griffin Act) by Department of Labor attorneys. The new pressures on Glimco and Local 777 led to more death-threats against Abata and other DUOC leaders, On July 21, 1960, an NLRB trial examiner found that Glimco and Local 777 had indeed coerced taxicab drivers into joining the union, and ordered the refund of $750,000 in illegally obtained dues. Glimco immediately appealed the NLRB's order. He was granted a delay on May 30, 1961, and refunded dues to just four cab drivers by June.

The NLRB had yet to rule on DUOC's petition for a union representational election by October 1960, which led DUOC members to strongly criticize the Board for the lengthy delays in issuing a ruling. Glimco attempted to organize taxicab drivers in suburban Chicago, which would demonstrate worker support for him and his administration of the union, but was unsuccessful. Nevertheless, he ran his own slate of candidates for delegate to the Teamsters national convention, and the slate easily won.

An NLRB-supervised union representation election was finally held on July 19, 1961, and Local 777 was ousted as the taxicab drivers' representative. Both Glimco and DUOC promised a clean election, and the NLRB ordered that the election would be by secret ballot. The NLRB also consolidated the ULP case with the election petition, held that Glimco and Local 777 had used coercion against DUOC in the election drive, and ordered Glimco again to refund dues to Yellow and Checker cab drivers.

As the NLRB edged closer to setting an election date, Glimco asked a court on June 15 to halt the election, but the NLRB reiterated its intention to hold an election seven days later. On June 26, the NLRB said the election would be held on July 19. On July 7, the D.C. Circuit Court of Appeals turned down Glimco's plea for a delay. As the election neared, Glimco spent more than $250,000 to sway members, and Abata and other DUOC leaders were put under a 24-hour police guard after "labor sluggers" began following them. DUOC had few funds to run a campaign, and Abata mortgaged his home and borrowed money to finance his campaign. Jimmy Hoffa declared his support for Glimco on July 13, and reiterated it the day before the election. He also sent numerous Teamsters staff into Chicago, ordering them to do everything possible to support Glimco and Local 777. To prevent even the appearance of intimidation during the voting, the NLRB election officer refused to allow Chicago police inside the buildings where the taxi drivers would be voting. On July 15, Glimco filed an appeal with the U.S. Supreme Court to stop the election; it was the first time in American history the high court had been asked to block a union representation election. Glimco also filed an emergency petition with the NLRB seeking a halt to the election plans. Hoffa came to Chicago on July 16 to campaign on Glimco's behalf. On July 17, Illinois Democratic Senator Paul Douglas endorsed Abata. The same day, U.S. Supreme Court Associate Justice Tom C. Clark and the NLRB denied Glimco's petitions. On election day, the Chicago police ordered extra patrols in areas where balloting was occurring, and the NLRB banned electioneering near polling places.

On July 19, more than 5,000 cab drivers and cab company mechanics in four bargaining units voted 3,122 to 1,760 to oust Local 777 and seek representation by DUOC.

== Second NLRB election fight ==
Glimco blamed the election loss on Senator Douglas' July 17 comments. Attorney General Robert F. Kennedy, the Illinois Federation of Labor, and the Chicago Crime Commission hailed the election as a blow to mob dominance of Chicago unions. The loss also weakened Glimco's position in the mob. In part, this was also due to external events beyond his control. Glimco's chief patron in the Chicago Outfit, Louis Campagna, had retired around 1950. Murray "The Camel" Humphreys tried to oversee Glimco's activities after Campagna's departure but had been forced out of the labor rackets by his fellow mobsters in 1953. Over the next few years, Humphreys continued to accuse Glimco of picking fights with other gangsters. Campagna died of a heart attack in Florida in 1955. That left Glimco with no patron in the mob. With the election loss, Humphreys and other top Chicago Outfit leaders now began considering ousting Glimco in favor of mobsters like Gus Zapas (a Hoffa aide), Rudy Fratto (another Hoffa associate), and Carl Hildebrand (a Humphreys protégé).

Glimco immediately began to fight to regain control of the rebel cab drivers and mechanics. A legal strategy was planned which would overturn the election on the grounds that the NLRB election agents were biased. This strategy failed when the NLRB's regional office denied his appeal in August 1961. A further appeal to the national NLRB also failed. Local 777 also tried to continue to deduct dues from the breakaway workers even though it no longer represented them. Organizing new workers into the union was another aspect of the strategy to improve Glimco's standing in the union and the Chicago Outfit. Under his direction, Local 777 launched an organizing drive among suburban Chicago cab drivers in August 1961.

The success of the Checker and Yellow cab drivers had ramifications beyond Local 777. Truck drivers dissatisfied with the Teamsters union considered forming an independent union under DUOC's leadership. In mid-August, cab drivers in St. Louis, Missouri, disaffiliated from the Teamsters, and disaffiliation efforts began in several truck drivers' locals throughout the Midwest. Glimco needed to strengthen his control in Chicago in order to discourage the rebellions, or else the Chicago Outfit would remove him from power.

Glimco's only remaining tactic was to regain control over the breakaway cab drivers and mechanics via a second union representational organizing election, and that is the strategy he subsequently pursued. The NLRB certified the election results on September 12, 1961; Abata was elected president of the new union 10 days later; and contract talks opened with the employers. DUOC secured a three-year contract in March 1962. Glimco declared the DUOC contract to be a sweetheart deal, and sued to prevent it from coming into force. Despite earlier reluctance to support Abata, the AFL-CIO now embraced his union and granted DUOC charters which helped protect the newly established union from being raided for members by other AFL-CIO unions. (Note: The Teamsters had been ejected by the AFL-CIO for corruption on December 6, 1957, and thus were not bound by the no-raid protections of the AFL-CIO constitution.) Seafarers International Union President Paul Hall agreed (with the backing of the AFL-CIO Executive Council) to let DUOC affiliate with his union on January 18, 1962. At the ceremony presenting the charter to DUOC, Local 777 threw up a picket line, taunted Abata and Hall, and then assaulted a police officer. The police hustled the Teamsters members out of the meeting room and advised Abata and Hall to leave. When they did, the picketers assaulted them in the street. Abata and Hall held their own for several minutes until additional police arrived to break up the melee. The charter presentation incident was only the first of many acts of violence, vandalism, intimidation, coercion, burglary, and bombings that followed over the next three years. DUOC's offices were broken into five days after the charter ceremony. Taxicabs driven by DUOC members were stolen, vandalized, set ablaze, and thrown into the Chicago River. Someone attempted to burn down Local 777's offices, and Jimmy Hoffa announced he would have Teamsters organizers ride in DUOC cabs in order to convince them to rejoin the Teamsters. But the Chicago Police Department accused Glimco's supporters of setting the fire and exonerated DUOC supporters of any crimes. Chicago police cars began tailing taxis throughout the city in order to stop the violence, and the Federal Bureau of Investigation (FBI) began a probe into the violence. As Glimco's suit against the enforcement of the DUOC contract continued, federal District court judge Julius Howard Miner used the lawsuit as a means of bringing Glimco under the jurisdiction of the court in an attempt to stop the violence. DUOC alleged that Local 777 attorneys were corrupt and Glimco tried to have the court void the union shop provisions of the contract as a violation of the Taft-Hartley Act, but in November 1962 Judge Miner ruled that the contract was valid and could be enforced. High levels of violence continued throughout the latter half of 1962 and into the summer of 1963. The violence did not win DUOC members to the Teamsters side, but did lead DUOC members to question Abata's leadership. The violence wound down throughout the latter half of 1963. In November 1963, the NLRB filed ULPs against Local 777, accusing it of intimidation and coercion in the ongoing labor fight—charges Glimco strenuously denied. On April 17, 1964, despite three months of negotiations between the union and the NLRB, Glimco and Local 777 were found guilty of contempt of court by the D.C. Circuit Court of Appeals and ordered to cease and desist all violence, coercion, and intimidation against DUOC. On August 30, 1964, DUOC vice president Everett L. "Red" Clark announced he was running against Dominic Abata for the presidency of DUOC. Clark won the election held on September 3, 1964, by a vote of 777 to 767.

Even as Glimco was yet again held in contempt by the D.C. Circuit Court of Appeals (and even arrested), he filed for a union representation election in the four DUOC-represented bargaining units in November 1964. Stung by criticism over its years-long delay in the previous election filing, the NLRB moved with dispatch and ordered a second representation election in April 1965. But as the May 5 election approached, there were signs that Glimco was losing his hold over Local 777. On April 22, Teamsters Joint Council 25 took control of the Teamsters election campaign and moved the election headquarters out of Local 777's offices. The AFL-CIO and Chicago Federation of Labor campaigned heavily for DUOC. But more than 80 individual CFL unions supported Local 777, as did William McFetridge, the former president of the Service Employees International Union. Both the Seafarers and Teamsters sent large numbers of staff into Chicago to sway votes, and an estimated $250,000 was spent by both sides. But the 6,000 cab drivers and mechanics voted 3,081 to 1,612 to continue their representation with DUOC.

== Later life and death ==
Glimco's 1959 appearance before the Senate Select Committee on Improper Activities in Labor and Management resulted in his indictment in 1964. The investigation began in the fall of 1961, when federal investigators concluded that Glimco owed $144,000 in back taxes. A federal grand jury indicted him on 17 counts of income tax evasion on December 17, 1964, to which Glimco pleaded not guilty. After a two-year delay, Glimco went on trial, and on June 19, 1968, a federal district court found him liable for $94,465 in back taxes, fines, and penalties. Glimco appealed to the U.S. Supreme Court, but the Court rejected his appeal on December 9, 1968. Glimco delayed paying the taxes and fines for another year, and in February 1970 the federal government filed suit to seize his home and automobile in order to obtain payment. Glimco agreed to pay the taxes, but did not do so until May 1973 (when the amount, plus interest, equalled more than $200,000).

Concurrently with his tax troubles, Glimco was indicted for violations of the Taft-Hartley Act again. On June 1, 1966, a federal grand jury accused him of accepting a sports car, home sprinkler system, frozen turkeys, and other gifts from employers so that he might use his influence in another union's collective bargaining negotiations and secure a better deal for the employers. Glimco pleaded not guilty. Initially, Glimco also claimed that since the prior indictments on the charges had been dismissed in 1957 because they had been improperly drawn, he should not stand trial on the redrawn indictment either. But a federal court disagreed in April 1967. More than 22 delays were permitted by the court during Glimco's subsequent trial, but on February 4, 1969, he changed his plea to guilty and agreed to a $40,000 fine—the most severe penalty permitted by the Taft-Hartley Act.

Glimco's authority within the Teamsters suffered a significant blow after the second election loss. Teamsters President Jimmy Hoffa considered removing him as Local 777 president. But although Glimco remained president of Local 777, his power within the Teamsters and the Chicago Outfit was broken and he largely dropped from public sight after 1965. Nevertheless, he still remained involved with the Chicago Outfit. In 1970, Senator John McClellan sponsored and the Congress passed the Organized Crime Control Act, a law crafted partly in response to the difficulty law enforcement officials had in breaking Glimco's hold on the Chicago taxi drivers' union. Glimco made a rare public appearance in 1972 when he attended the funeral of Paul Ricca.

Glimco's legal troubles dogged him until his death. The lawsuits over the misuse of Local 777's pension and welfare fund did not end until June 1977, making it one of the longest-running lawsuits in Chicago court history. The final charges against him came in 1989. In March 1989, the Teamsters settled a long-running labor racketeering lawsuit brought by the U.S. Department of Justice and agreed to be supervised by an Independent Review Board (IRB) and staff of monitors in order to avoid being taken over by the federal government. In December 1989, one of the federal monitors sought to remove Glimco from the union due to his lengthy and ongoing involvement with organized crime.

These charges against Glimco were still pending when he died at MacNeal Hospital in Berwyn, Illinois on April 28, 1991. Glimco is buried in Queen of Heaven Cemetery, Hillside, Illinois.

His wife survived him and died in 1999.

== In popular culture ==
Glimco is portrayed in Martin Scorsese's film The Irishman (2019), by Bo Dietl.
