= Charles Gioe =

American gangster

Charles Gioe

Charles Joye "Cherry Nose" Gioe (February 6, 1904 – August 18, 1954) was an American mobster and lieutenant in the Chicago Outfit crime family who was a partner in the Hollywood extortion scandals of the 1940s.

== Biography ==
Charles Joey Gioe was born on February 6, 1904. He became a high-ranking lieutenant for the Chicago Outfit, specializing in extortion and blackmail, under Frank Nitti after Al Capone's 1931 tax evasion conviction. In 1936, Gioe went to Des Moines, Iowa to expand syndicate operations. He eventually returned to Chicago, leaving underboss Louis "Cock-Eyed Louie" Fratto in control of the Des Moines operations. During the mid-1930s, Gioe, Paul "The Waiter" Ricca and Louis "Little New York" Campagna, began financially supporting extortion operations by Willie Morris Bioff and George Brown against Hollywood movie studios. In exchange for annual payoffs to the Outfit, the mob-controlled projectionist unions would refrain from labor strikes and disruptions.

In the late 1930s, the extortion racket was busted by law enforcement. On March 18, 1943, Gioe, Ricca, and Campagna were indicted for extortion; Bioff and Browne agreed to testify against them. On December 31, 1943, Gioe was convicted of extortion and sentenced to ten years in prison. Gioe was later paroled (along with the other syndicate members) in 1947, despite protests from Senator Estes Kefauver. Upon his release, Gioe became second to Ricca and Campagna as the top Chicago syndicate leader.

On August 18, 1954, Charles Gioe was shot to death by Mafia soldiers controlled by Joseph "Joey" Glimco after he accidentally interfered in a dispute Glimco was having with a contractor building a Howard Johnson's restaurant.

== See also ==
- List of homicides in Illinois § Organized crime
