= Kavner =

Kavner is a surname. Notable people with the surname include:

- Julie Kavner (born 1950), American actress
- Richard Kavner (20th century), American trade union official
