= William Morris Bioff =

American organized crime figure (1900–1955)

William Morris "Willie" Bioff (October 12, 1900 – November 4, 1955) was a Jewish-American organized crime figure who operated as a Chicago pimp and corrupt union leader between the 1920s and the 1940s. Using his position as head of the movie production workers' union, Bioff helped Chicago Outfit boss Frank Nitti successfully extort millions of dollars from Hollywood film studios by using the threat of a general strike that would paralyze the American film industry.

== Criminal career ==
Bioff was born and briefly raised in a kosher Jewish household in Chicago, but his father kicked him out on the street when he was eight years old. Bioff soon became involved in criminal ventures, beginning with petty theft, then minor protection rackets and working his way up to pimping in Chicago's Levee vice district, of which he was later convicted in 1922. Bioff later worked for Harry and Jake "Greasy Thumb" Guzik where, through Guzik, Bioff met Al Capone and later Frank "The Enforcer" Nitti.

In the 1930s, Nitti sent Bioff to California as an enforcer for Mafia-controlled union leader George Browne, who later became President of the International Alliance of Theatrical Stage Employees. Bioff, aided by John "Handsome Johnny" Roselli, eventually became the collector for the Syndicate-controlled unions in Hollywood, extorting millions of dollars from major motion-picture studios, and keeping several hundred thousand for himself. As one source notes with irony:

Amusingly, Bioff, a glorified Chicago thug, went Hollywood in a big way with his sudden wealth. But his fancy suits and solid gold business cards made him too high profile ... – hence the indictment.

Bioff later threatened a strike against New York movie theaters by demanding two projectionists in each theater. When owners complained they would go broke under the terms he demanded, Bioff agreed to an arrangement for two projectionists in exchange for reduced pay, much of which went to Bioff. By the late 1930s, a newspaper campaign began bringing attention to the Bioff-Browne extortion operation, creating a huge scandal in Hollywood.

== Indictment and testimony ==
In 1943, Bioff was indicted for tax evasion and related crimes, as well as extortion and racketeering, along with a number of his associates. Rather than face prison, Bioff testified against his companions, including Paul "The Waiter" Ricca, Philip D'Andrea, Charlie "Cherry Nose" Gioe, Johnny Roselli, Lou Kaufman, and Frank "The Enforcer" Nitti. The defendants received 10-year sentences. Nitti committed suicide shortly after Bioff's testimony. Bioff received a reduced sentence, along with Browne.

Upon his release, Bioff moved to Arizona and assumed a new identity, "William Nelson", and reportedly developed a friendship with then Senator Barry Goldwater, even so far as going into business with the senator's nephew Bobby. Bioff, however, soon began working for Riviera Casino manager Gus Greenbaum, at the Chicago Outfit-owned Las Vegas casino.

On November 4, 1955, shortly after the release of his former companions, Bioff was assassinated through a bombing described as follows:

Bioff walked out of his home and slid behind the wheel of his truck. A moment later, an explosion rocked the neighborhood. Parts of Bioff and his truck were strewn all over the driveway. Police found the remains of a dynamite bomb wired to the starter. The killers were never found.

== See also ==
- List of homicides in Illinois § Organized crime
- List of unsolved murders (1900–1979)

== Bibliography ==
- Kelly, Robert J. Encyclopedia of Organized Crime in the United States. Westport, Connecticut: Greenwood Press, 2000. ISBN 0-313-30653-2
- Sifakis, Carl. The Mafia Encyclopedia. New York: Facts on File Inc., 2005 ISBN 0-8160-5694-3
- Sifakis, Carl. The Encyclopedia of American Crime. New York: Facts on File Inc., 2005. ISBN 0-8160-4040-0
- Almog, Oz, Kosher Nostra Jüdische Gangster in Amerika, 1890–1980; Jüdischen Museum der Stadt Wien; 2003, Text Oz Almog, Erich Metz, ISBN 3-901398-33-3
