= Paul Dorfman =

American mobster and trade unionist (1901–1971)

- Born: 1901
- Died: 12 March 1971 (aged 69–70)
- Other name: "Red"
- Occupations: Union official, mobster
- Children: Allen Dorfman
- Allegiance: Teamsters, Chicago Outfit
- Criminal charges: Electoral fraud (1928); Assault (1942); Extortion (1964, acquitted)

Paul "Red" Dorfman (1901 – 1971) was an American mobster associated with the Chicago Outfit and a close associate of Teamsters union president Jimmy Hoffa, having introduced him to the world of organized crime in Chicago. He was described by the US Senate's McClellan Committee as "the contact man between dishonest union leaders and members of the Chicago Underworld". In 1957, he was expelled from the AFL-CIO for corrupt practices.

== Biography ==
In his youth Dorfman was a prizefighter managed by Sam Pian, he fought under the name "Red Dorfman". He began to do enforcer work for the mafia, becoming favored by Murray Humphreys. Although he was never convicted of any crime, he was arrested in 1928 in connection to electoral fraud in a local election and in 1942 for the beating of a trade union official with knuckle-dusters.

He became involved with the Chicago Outfit while it was under the control of Al Capone. His associates included Capone men like Tony Accardo and other mobsters like Abner Zwillman. The FBI considered Dorfman as one of the six people closest to Accardo. In 1939, after the previous union president Leon Cooke was murdered, Dorfman rose to become the new president of the Chicago Waste Handlers Union. He had no experience with unions and took over the leadership on the night of his first dues payment. The chief investigator for the Illinois State Attorney protested to the American Federation of Labor, describing Dorfman as a "discredit to legitimate labor".

Dorfman had an "association and acquaintance" with Jack Ruby, the killer of Lee Harvey Oswald. After Dorfman took over the Waste Handlers Union, Ruby worked under Dorfman as an organizer for a period of two months. He was later interviewed by the FBI about his relationship with Ruby, whom he told that he had not seen Ruby since 1940, with the exception of a few unplanned encounters on the street. Dorfman described Ruby as a "real nice guy" with "liberal" views. He denied firing Ruby, stating that Ruby was fired by the union on the orders of the American Federation of Labor regional office when it temporarily took over the union following Cooke's murder.

=== Hoffa years ===
At some point in the late 1940s he became friends with Jimmy Hoffa. According to the McClellan Committee, Dorfman was "the contact man between dishonest union leaders and members of the Chicago Underworld". In his book, The Enemy Within (1960), Senator Bobby Kennedy who had sat on the McClellan Committee, described Dorfman as "a big operator" and a "major figure in the Chicago underworld who also knew his way around in certain labor and political circles". He added that Dorfman and Hoffa "are now as one. Everywhere Hoffa goes, Dorfman is close by. Most important decisions by Hoffa are made only after consultation with Paul Dorfman". Besides Hoffa, Dorfman was a friend of Sam Giancana and Santo Trafficante Jr.

Dorfman developed a reputation for violence and as someone to be feared. Frank Ragano, Hoffa's lawyer, described him as a man with a reputation as a "throwback to the old-style Chicago gangland thug. His penetrating gaze was chilling, almost terrifying", while one Teamster official recalled "Red was a real tough guy, a hood's hood" and "he was the kind of guy who'd walk in and throw two bullets on a guy's desk and tell him, 'The next one goes in your fuckin' head'."

It was through Dorfman that Hoffa began to establish relationships with Chicago organized crime. He introduced Hoffa to former Capone associates like Joseph Glimco and Paul Ricca. He helped Hoffa make in-roads into New York City, convincing his associate Anthony Doria of the UAW-AFL union to charter a new union local to be run by Sam Zachman. It was organized by a friend of Dorfman and Hoffa, Johnny Dio. He obtained a Teamsters charter for Local 805 in New York, to be run by Abe Gordon, and for Local 447 in St. Louis, to be run by Harry Karsh.

In 1949 Dorfman introduced Hoffa to his stepson Allen Dorfman, who became heavily involved in Teamsters corruption. According to FBI files, Dorfman agreed to introduce Hoffa to mob figures in exchange for Allen's entry into the Teamsters' insurance business. Allen and his mother set up Union Insurance Agency, and in 1950, would receive their first contract with the Teamsters. Allen was a millionaire within five years. Dorfman had a close association with Theodore Shulman, President of the Sanatex Corporation and Executive Director of the Waste Trade Industry of Chicago. These two organizations were employers of the men in Dorfman's union. In Autumn 1951 the employers were faced with the prospect of increased wages for their workers. Dorfman ensured that a compromise agreement was reached. In return Shulman helped the insurance company ran by the Dorfmans. Two individuals on Shulman's payroll had the sole job of selling insurance for the Dorfmans. In the late 1950s Paul and Allen Dorfman helped set up the Teamster's Central States Conference health and welfare pensions program. With Hoffa and other Teamsters officials he invested in the Northwest Oil Company in North and South Dakota.

In 1956 he sat on the Sponsors Committee of the "Jimmie Hoffa Testimonial Dinner" held in Detroit. Hoffa was brought to trial for bribery in 1957. Given that the jury was composed of eight blacks and four whites, Hoffa made overtures to the black jurors. Dorfman and Barney Baker arranged for the black boxer Joe Louis to walk up and hug Hoffa in view of the jurors. Hoffa was found not guilty. Dorfman approached the International Boxing Club, ran by a friend of his Truman Gibson, to make this arrangement.

==== Committee investigations ====
In 1953 Dorfman and his son were called before a Special Subcommittee of the Committee on Education and Labor that was tasked with investigating abuses of welfare funds. They pled the Fifth Amendment 135 times. The subcommittee voted to cite both for contempt of congress. In 1957 he was expelled from the AFL-CIO for corrupt practices. The grounds were that Dorfman had gained a "personal advantage" from his family's insurance company via its handling of the welfare accounts of the Teamster Michigan State Council, the Teamsters Central States Conference, and a Midwest local of the International Brotherhood of Electrical Workers. Dorfman used his union contacts to secure business for his family, with his wife receiving profit of $100,000 per annum. As well as his regular salary, he was drawing remuneration from the welfare fund of his union local, which was not audited up to the standards of the AFL.

Later he was called to testify before the McClellan committee on 30 January 1959. The committee was probing the Dorfman family's insurance business and its relationship to Hoffa and the Teamsters. Dorfman took the Fifth amendment, even when asked if Allen Dorfman was his son. Daniel Healy of the AFL-CIO testified before the committee that Dorfman had been taking salaries from both the general fund and the health and welfare fund of the waste handlers union, and that employers had been violating contracts negotiated by Dorfman with his own consent. The public disclosure of activities by Dorfman and others influenced Congress to pass the Landrum–Griffin Act in 1959. In 1964 Dorfman and his son Allen, were indicted by a San Francisco grand jury on charges of extorting $100,000 from a San Franciscan insurance executive. They were acquitted.

He died in Chicago on 12 March 1971.
