= Wint Smith =

American politician

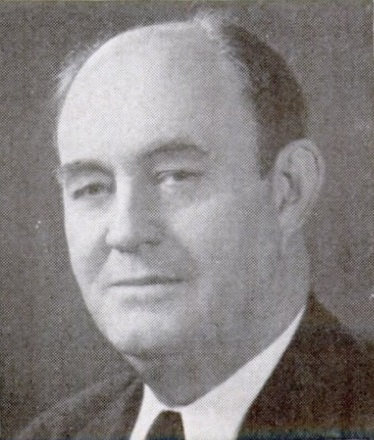

Member of the U.S. House of Representatives from Kansas's 6th district
- In office January 3, 1947 – January 3, 1961
- Preceded by: Frank Carlson
- Succeeded by: Bob Dole

Personal details
- Born: October 7, 1892 Mankato, Kansas
- Died: April 27, 1976 (aged 83) Wichita, Kansas
- Resting place: Mount Hope Cemetery
- Party: Republican

Wint Smith (October 7, 1892 – April 27, 1976) was an American lawyer and politician who served seven terms as a U.S. representative from Kansas from 1947 to 1961.

== Biography ==
=== Early life and political career ===
Born in Mankato, Kansas, Smith attended a public school and graduated from Mankato High School. He attended the University of Kansas in 1920 and the Yale Law School in 1922. He was admitted to the bar in 1923 and commenced practice in Kansas City, Kansas. He was admitted to practice in all federal courts, including the United States Supreme Court in 1934. From 1931 to 1940 he served as assistant attorney general and he was attorney for the Kansas Highway Commission from 1932 to 1940.

In 1933, the Kansas Legislature authorized the Highway Commission to hire 10 motor vehicle inspectors, increasing this number to 26 by November 1933. The legislation authorizing these inspectors charged them with the duty to patrol state highways as much as possible. In 1935, Governor Alfred Landon issued orders to the inspectors to "curb banditry" as far as the law would permit. With Landon's support, and statewide police jurisdiction, the inspectors' war on crime began. Wint Smith, as chief of the legal department of the Highway Commission, served as director of the motor vehicle inspectors until the formation of the Kansas Highway Patrol in 1937.

Smith was elected as a Republican from an open seat to the 80th United States Congress and to the six succeeding Congresses (January 3, 1947 – January 3, 1961). While Kansas was reliably Republican as was his district, from 1954 on Smith’s election margin fell regularly until in 1958 he won with less than a majority of the vote. Primary results also trended down for Smith. In 1958 he was nominated against two contenders with less than a majority. He explained that his decision to retire in 1960 was because his “constituents began apologizing for my conservatism.”

Opposition to organized labor was the reason Smith gave for his initial House campaign and it continued to power his congressional service. His northwest Kansas district was overwhelmingly agricultural; it is difficult to see how labor-management battles were critical to his constituents. His opposition to the policies of Republican President Dwight Eisenhower attracted the attention of Life magazine. He appears to have not been an activist representative. In fourteen years he spoke only 23 times on the floor of the House and moved only one floor amendment. One of his public bills was enacted addressing wheat production quotas. Smith did serve on the executive committee of the United States Civil War Centennial Commission, which enabled the airing of his racism. He voted against the Civil Rights Acts of 1957 and 1960.

In 1953 then Teamsters Vice President Jimmy Hoffa was facing pressure from a Senate subcommittee investigation. On Hoffa's behalf Barney Baker and Richard Kavner approached former Kansas governor Payne Ratner to intercede with Smith, who was chairman of the committee. Ratner successfully convinced Smith to ease off investigating Hoffa.

=== Military career ===
On 1 January 1915, Smith enlisted in the Kansas National Guard. From 26 June to 30 August 1916, he was in federal service during the Pancho Villa Expedition. After U.S. entry into World War I, Smith attended the First Officers Training Camp from 11 May to 14 August 1917, being commissioned as a second lieutenant on 15 August. He earned two Purple Hearts while serving in France, rising to the rank of captain in the Infantry before his discharge on 4 September 1919.

On 10 March 1923, he was commissioned a captain in the Signal Corps, commanding the 35th Signal Company of the 35th Division, headquartered in Kansas City, Kansas. On 1 July 1933, he was commissioned a major in the Infantry. On 30 July 1935, he was commissioned a lieutenant colonel in the Cavalry, serving as executive officer of the 114th Cavalry Regiment. When the 114th Cavalry was converted into the 127th Field Artillery Regiment of the 35th Division in October 1940, Smith became executive officer of the regiment.

Smith was inducted into federal service with the 35th Division in December 1940. From May 1941 to December 1945, he served as the commanding officer of the 35th Division's provisional antitank battalion, later designated the 635th Tank Destroyer Battalion. As the unit's sole commanding officer from activation to inactivation, Smith served in the United States, and for twenty-two months overseas in England, France, Belgium, and Germany. When he retired, he was promoted to brigadier general. He later resumed the practicing of law.

=== Personal life ===
Smith was not a candidate for renomination in 1960 to the Eighty-seventh Congress and was succeeded by fellow Republican Robert J. Dole of Russell. He subsequently returned to his home in Mankato and engaged in farming and ranching. He died in Wichita, Kansas, April 27, 1976.

== Death and burial ==
He was interred in Mount Hope Cemetery, in Mankato.

U.S. House of Representatives
Preceded by Frank Carlson	Member of the U.S. House of Representatives from Kansas's 6th congressional district 1947–1961	Succeeded by Bob Dole
