= Alliance for Labor Action =

American and Canadian national trade union center from 1968 to 1972

- Founded: July 24, 1968
- Dissolved: January 24, 1972
- Headquarters: Washington, D.C.
- Location(s): Canada; United States
- Members: 3.7 million

The Alliance for Labor Action (ALA) was an American and Canadian national trade union center which existed from July 1968 until January 1972. Its two main members were the United Auto Workers (UAW) and the International Brotherhood of Teamsters, although it had some smaller affiliates.

== Formation and growth ==
The Teamsters had been expelled from the AFL-CIO in 1957 for corruption. The UAW had disaffiliated from the AFL-CIO on July 1, 1968, after UAW President Walter Reuther and AFL-CIO President George Meany could not come to agreement on a wide range of policy issues or reforms to AFL-CIO governance. Although Teamsters president Frank Fitzsimmons was originally seen as a proxy for jailed Teamsters president Jimmy Hoffa, Fitzsimmons had begun taking a more leftist stand on a number of public policy issues. Reuther was particularly impressed that Fitzsimmons had been the only other national labor leader present at the funeral of Martin Luther King, Jr.

On July 24, 1968, just days after the UAW disaffiliation, Fitzsimmons and Reuther formed the Alliance for Labor Action to organize unorganized workers and pursue leftist political and social projects. While Reuther himself remained active in the ALA, Fitzsimmons assigned Teamsters leader Harold J. Gibbons as his union's liaison.

Fitzsimmons and Reuther offered the AFL-CIO a no-raid pact as a first step toward building a working relationship between the competing trade union centers, but the offered was rejected. AFL-CIO President George Meany denounced the ALA as a dual union, although Reuther argued it was not. The ALA later passed a resolution permitting ALA members to raid AFL-CIO unions or organize in jurisdictions claimed by AFL-CIO unions if the AFL-CIO-affiliated union was not doing enough to organize workers into union. Although Reuther had a lengthy list of unions he hoped would join the ALA, few did so. In September 1968, the 110,000-member International Chemical Workers Union (now part of the United Food and Commercial Workers) affiliated with the ALA, and was expelled from the AFL-CIO a year later. Ten of the largest local unions (representing 40,000 members) belonging to the Retail, Wholesale and Department Store Union disaffiliated from that international union, formed a new union (the National Council of Distributive Workers of America), and joined the ALA. Although the United Rubber Workers and the Glass Workers both expressed official interest in joining the ALA, neither did so. The ALA's founding split the American Federation of Teachers, which debated joining but never formally considered such an act.

== Program and dissolution ==
The Alliance's initial program was ambitious. The two member unions provided the ALA with an annual budget of $4.5 million, the same amount they would have paid to the AFL-CIO in per capita dues. A major organizing drive targeting African American workers was launched in Atlanta, Georgia, in the fall of 1969 involving 50 staff organizers (half of them black), 200 volunteer member-organizers, a $4 million budget, and an extensive public relations campaign. But the campaign failed: After 28 months, only 4,590 workers had been organized, and 94 of 196 elections won.

The ALA's agenda also included action on a number of progressive issues. It engaged in a widespread community unionism effort. But its attempt to organize blue-collar workers, the poor, and local citizens into community unions was hampered by a lack of experience in community organizing. The ALA program turned into a grant-making operation working through the UAW's existing structure, awarding more than $2.5 million in funds in two and a half years. Although it had little organizational involvement in the anti-Vietnam War peace movement, the ALA called for an immediate end to the war, endorsed anti-war rallies, and its leaders marched in anti-war marches. The trade union center also supported universal health care, and gave an important early boost to modern efforts to pass federal legislation on the issue.

Reuther's death in a plane crash on May 9, 1970, near Black Lake, Michigan, dealt a serious blow to the Alliance. The group halted operations in July 1971 after the Auto Workers (almost bankrupt from a lengthy strike at General Motors) was unable to continue to fund its operations, and the ALA formally disbanded in January 1972. The Ford Foundation assumed control over the community grant programs upon the ALA's disestablishment.

The UAW re-affiliated with the AFL-CIO on July 1, 1981. The Teamsters re-affiliated with the AFL-CIO on October 24, 1987.

== Historical assessment ==
Some commentators conclude that the ALA is unimportant, historically. For example, Harold Meyerson argues that "the Alliance for Labor Action, alas, never really did anything." Others conclude that it never could have evolved into a major force in the American labor movement: The UAW was no longer a potent political force by 1968, the UAW was on the verge losing half a million members and agreeing to major contract concessions in the auto industry, and neither the UAW nor Teamsters had much organizing capacity (neither had engaged in any significant efforts to organize new members for decades).

Other commentators disagree. The ALA, some historians say, gave the anti-war movement a voice for the first time within the American labor movement. Although the ALA's own community organizing efforts failed, they encouraged and promoted a long-lasting (if small) community organizing effort in some major cities which survived into the 21st century. Commentators at the time of Reuther's death and a quarter-century later have also concluded that it was Reuther's untimely demise which led to the ALA's failure, rather than anything inherent in its members, structure, or goals.
