= Barney Baker =

American mobster and trade unionist (1911–1990)

- Born: Robert Baker; 16 August 1911; New York
- Died: 1990 (aged 78–79)
- Other name: "Barney"
- Occupations: Union official, mobster
- Allegiance: Teamsters

Robert "Barney" Baker (August 16, 1911 – 1990) was an American mobster associated with Jimmy Hoffa.

== Biography ==
Baker was born on August 16, 1911, in New York City. He had two siblings, his brother Herman and his sister Rose. In 1936 Baker was non-fatally wounded by a gunman as he walked along a Manhattan street in the company of future Teamsters vice-president John O'Rourke. In 1946 he moved to Hollywood, Florida, getting a job as a doorman and bouncer at the Colonial Inn, owned by Jake Lansky, the brother of Meyer Lansky. In 1950 he was elected president of Local 730 in Washington, D.C. He resigned from this position in 1952 when Jimmy Hoffa brought Baker in as an organizer for the Central States Conference of Teamsters. He had also served as an organizer for various Teamsters locals in Chicago, Detroit, and Omaha, Nebraska.

As a former prizefighter whose weight stood at approximately 385 pounds, Baker would provide muscle to the unions. In 1952 he was hired by Harold J. Gibbons, whom he performed this service for and acted as his bodyguard. In 1953 Hoffa was facing pressure from a Senate subcommittee investigation. On Hoffa's behalf Baker and Richard Kavner approached the former Kansas governor Payne Ratner to intercede with Chairman Wint Smith. Ratner successfully convinced Smith to ease off investigating Hoffa. In St. Louis, April 1953, Baker was arrested while in possession of a gun, however after the Teamsters intervened they were unable prosecute.

=== McClellan Committee ===
Baker testified before the McClellan Committee of the US Senate over a period of two days. Although encouraged by his lawyers to plead the Fifth, he instead continuously made jokes throughout the hearings and listed off his criminal associates. He named Meyer Lansky, Bugsy Siegel, Mike Coppola, and Joe Adonis. As Time describe it, "Baker decided to clown his way through a performance". At one point he informed the committee that at separate sittings he had consumed 4 pounds of spaghetti and 38 pounds of meat.

His ex-wife, Mollie Baker also testified. Baker dismissed her testimony as that of "a vengeful woman, a woman scorned". She stated that Baker had been chairman of the Harriman-for-President labor committee in 1952, worked for Harriman in his campaign against Estes Kefauver, at one point frequently talked with him on the phone, and possessed a signed photograph from Harriman signed "To my dearest friend Barney". Now the Governor of New York, Harriman called a press conference to dismiss the allegations and Baker attacked his ex-wife for trying to destroy "a man I honor and love".

Members of the committee, Senator Bobby Kennedy and Chairman John J. McClellan, scolded Baker. Senator Kennedy stated "The people you associate with are the scum of the United States, and you are a part of them", with Chairman McClellan accusing him of committing perjury "over and over". Kennedy later noted that Hoffa had become "dependent on the racketeers and ex-convicts with whom he had surrounded himself", among them was Barney Baker. Following the hearings Baker was convicted under the Taft-Hartley Act. He was sentenced to two years in prison, which he unsuccessfully appealed, serving time in Sandstone Prison, Minnesota.

Hoffa was brought to trial for bribery in 1957. Given that the jury consisted of eight blacks and four whites, Hoffa made overtures to the black jurors. Paul Dorfman and Baker arranged for the black boxer Joe Louis to walk up and hug Hoffa in view of the jurors. Hoffa was found not guilty. Dorfman approached the International Boxing Club, ran by a friend of his Truman Gibson, to make this arrangement, while Baker paid Louis' travel and hotel expenses. He also approached clergyman George G. Higgins, who recalls that Baker requested "that I come give 'James' some 'spiritual guidance' during a recess. When I told him Hoffa was welcome to come to my office, Barney insisted that he needed the spiritual guidance in the courtroom".

=== Jack Ruby ===
On 11 November 1963 Baker was called by Jack Ruby, the killer of Lee Harvey Oswald, who was charged with assassinating President John F. Kennedy. He was interviewed about this phone call by the FBI on 6 January 1964. He told the FBI that this was his only contact with Ruby, who had stated to him that he was told by what Ruby described as "mutual friends", that Baker could help "straighten out" the American Guild of Variety Artists, whom Ruby was having trouble with. Baker stated Ruby informed him that he would not name these mutual friends over the phone. On 23 May 1978 he was deposed by the House Select Committee on Assassinations, set up to re-investigate the Kennedy assassination, about this same phone call.
