= Harold J. Gibbons =

American trade unionist and labor leader

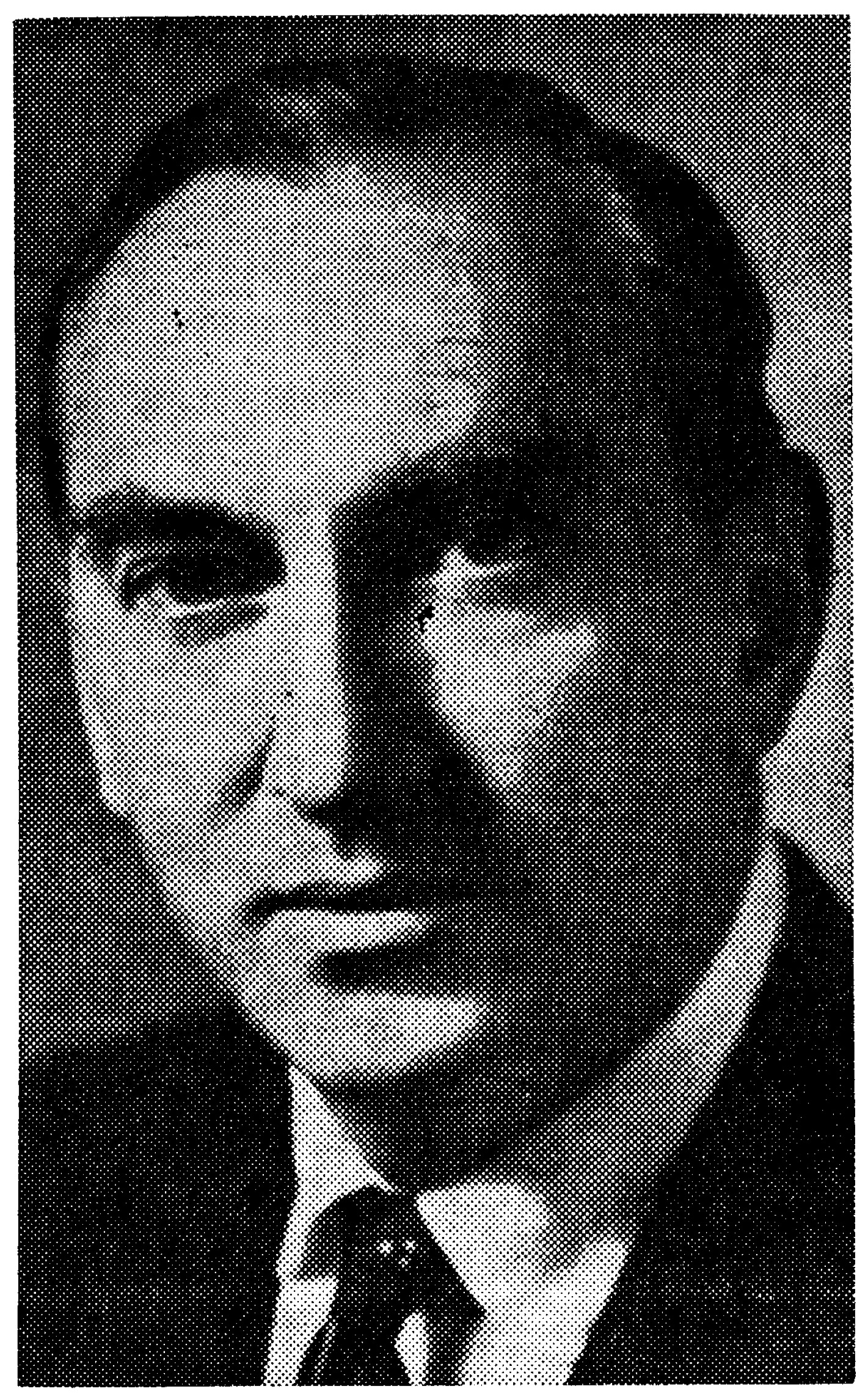
- Born: April 10, 1910; Lackawanna County, Pennsylvania
- Died: November 17, 1982 (aged 72)
- Occupation: Trade unionist
- Organization(s): Teamsters; Alliance for Labor Action

Harold Joseph Patrick Gibbons (April 10, 1910 – November 17, 1982) was an American trade unionist and labor leader.

== Biography ==
Born the youngest of 23 children in Archibald Patch, Lackawanna County, Pennsylvania, he nonetheless matriculated at the University of Chicago. He became a St. Louis union leader of Warehousemen, when St. Louis was America's fifth largest entrepot because of its situation on the Mississippi and Missouri Rivers, and a major rail hub. The Warehousemen and Department Store Worker merged into United Retail, Wholesale and Department Store Employees of America, and that local union merged into Teamsters Local 688 in St. Louis. The International Brotherhood of Teamsters was the third of three international trade union vice presidencies he held. He was also a vice president of the teachers' union and the AF of L. He was a delegate to Democratic National Convention from Missouri in 1952. He was vice-president of the Alliance for Labor Action to promote social concerns and to organize the unorganized. He was a member of the American Civil Liberties Union and NAACP.

The St. Louis union was considered to be one of the most progressive in the United States. It initiated health care centers for members, vacation centers at Lake of the Ozarks, and militated for good pension plans for its members. Under Gibbons the Union researched and submitted plans for the desegregation of schools which was promoted by the editorial page of the St. Louis Post-Dispatch. Gibbons and Local 688 were also noted for their support of public housing, and were instrumental in the construction of the large Council Plaza housing development, which has been listed on the National Register of Historic Places since 2007. In 1952 he became acquainted with Jimmy Hoffa's associate Barney Baker, who provided muscle for the union and acted as his bodyguard. Hoffa wanted Gibbons as Secretary-Treasurer of the Teamsters but Frank Fitzsimmons picked Dusty Miller despite Hoffa's objections.

For a time, Gibbons was widely considered to be the heir apparent to Jimmy Hoffa. Gibbons and Hoffa had a falling out in November 1963 over the Teamsters response to the assassination of John F. Kennedy. When Gibbons heard the news he lowered the flag at Teamsters headquarters to half-mast and composed a statement of condolences. Hoffa, who intensely disliked the Kennedy brothers, was furious about this, asking Gibbons "Why the hell did you do that for him? Who the hell was he?". He told Hoffa "Listen, when you get back here, you can get yourself a new boy". Gibbons decided to resign as Hoffa's executive assistant effective 1 January. Publicly Gibbons denied any rift between the two. Simultaneous to this, a number of Teamster officials who Gibbons had brought from St. Louis to work for Hoffa, such as Richard Kavner, also resigned.

Gibbons's work and political stances landed him on the master list of Nixon political opponents. Nixon's Chief Counsel, Charles Colson, directed White House Counsel John Dean to initiate tax audits on Gibbons, but Dean did not follow through. Gibbons's opposition to the Vietnam War led to Hoffa moving to marginalize him. Hoffa supported the war, while Gibbons had been a founder of Labor for Peace, and had visited Hanoi. Another source of friction was Bobby Kennedy, who had hounded Hoffa, and whom Gibbons had befriended. While Gibbons remained head of the Teamsters in St. Louis, he was maneuvered out of posts in which he could influence policy.

Gibbons died, from complications of a ruptured aortic aneurysm, in Los Angeles, California, November 17, 1982. Interment was at Memorial Park Cemetery, St. Louis, Missouri.

The site of the original Sportsman's Park baseball stadium in St. Louis, now a neighborhood playground, was named "Harold J. Gibbons Field" for him.

Gibbons's papers are in the archives of Southern Illinois University-Edwardsville which he was instrumental in founding, because Illinois union members who wished to pursue higher education had to make exhausting commutes to attend university in Carbondale.

== Bibliography ==
- Burnside, Gordon (2018). Harold Gibbons: St. Louis Teamsters Leader and Warrior Against Jim Crow. McFarland. ISBN 978-1476633664.
- Bussel, Robert (2015). Fighting for Total Person Unionism: Harold Gibbons, Ernest Calloway, and Working-Class Citizenship. University of Illinois Press. ISBN 978-0252097607.
- Moldea, Dan (1993). The Hoffa Wars: Teamsters, Rebels, Politicians and the Mob. SPI.
- Sheridan, Walter (1972). The Fall and Rise of Jimmy Hoffa. Saturday Review Press.
