= Truman Gibson =

Chicago attorney and boxing promoter (1912–2005)

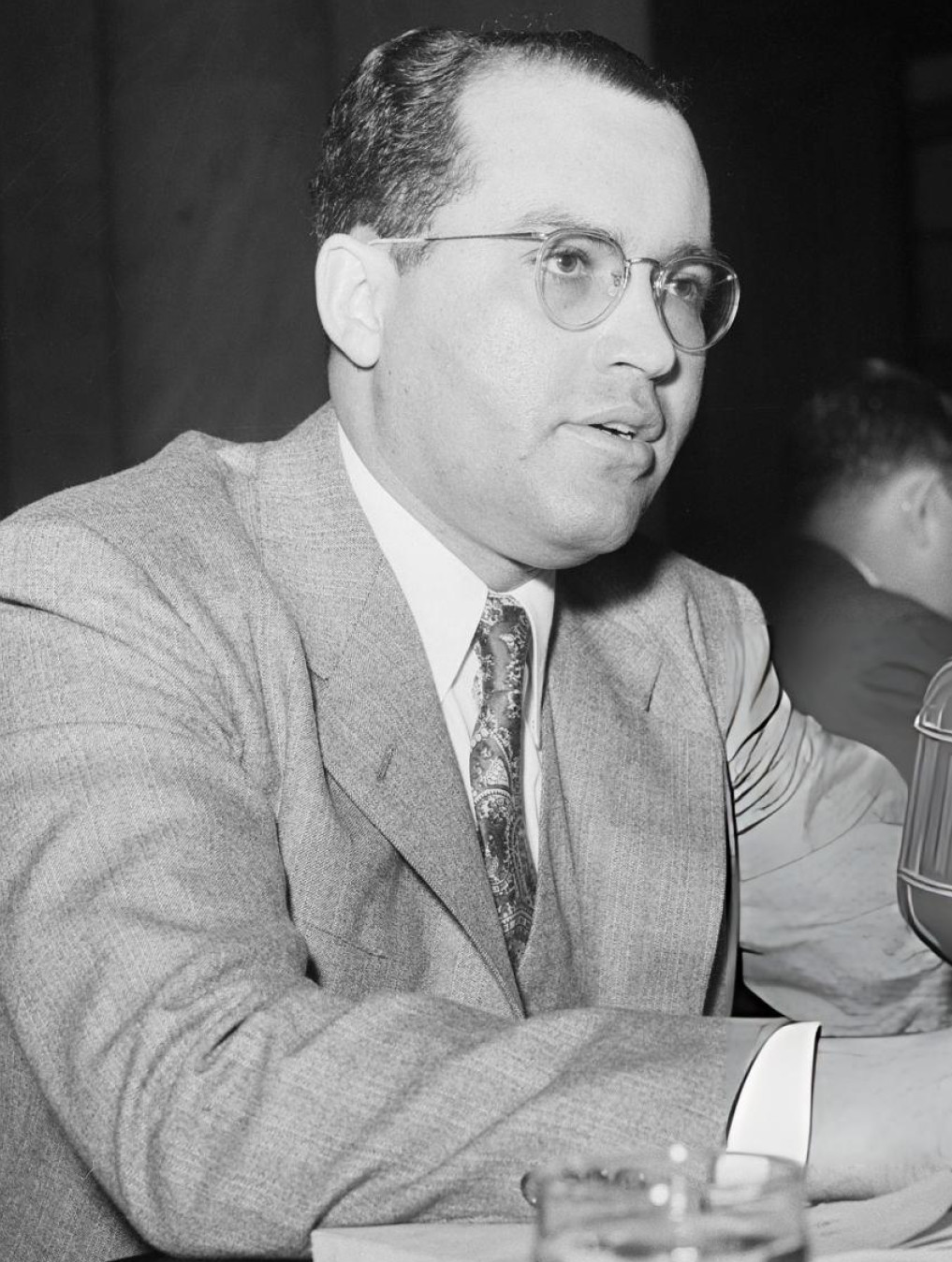
- Gibson in 1948
- Born: January 22, 1912; Atlanta, Georgia, U.S.
- Died: December 23, 2005 (aged 93); Chicago, Illinois, U.S.
- Other names: Gibson, Truman Kella Jr. (full name)
- Occupations: attorney, boxing promoter
- Known for: Member of Franklin Roosevelt's "Black Cabinet"

Truman Kella Gibson, Jr. (January 22, 1912 – December 23, 2005) was an African-American businessman, attorney, government advisor, and later influential boxing promoter who played a unique and unheralded role in the Civil Rights Movement, primarily as a member of the "Black Cabinet" of Presidents Franklin D. Roosevelt and Harry S. Truman. He discusses his early life and some of his achievements in his Oral History interview in the Harry S. Truman Library and Museum website.

== Early life ==
Gibson, the son of an insurance executive, was born in Atlanta, Georgia. While still young, he moved with his family to Columbus, Ohio. He graduated from the University of Chicago in 1932 and obtained a degree from its law school in 1935.

== Lawyer and government advisor ==
From 1935 to 1940, Gibson practiced law in Chicago. During this time, Gibson met then up-and-coming boxer Joe Louis, whom Gibson was charged with entertaining while Gibson’s law firm negotiated deals with Louis' management. He also helped organize Chicago’s American Negro Exposition in 1940, marking the 75th anniversary of emancipation.

Gibson's experience with the exposition drew the attention of progressives within the federal government. President Franklin Delano Roosevelt had created the post of civilian aide to the Secretary of War Henry L. Stimson, to speak on behalf of black men in the army. In 1940, Gibson was appointed as an assistant to this newly named adviser, William H. Hastie. Gibson's tasks included investigating complaints from black soldiers facing indignities, and sometimes violence, during their stateside training. On one occasion, Gibson was instrumental in obtaining a decision for several black Officer Candidate School candidates from Fort Riley, KS, whose OCS applications had been inexplicably delayed for several months. Joe Louis, then assigned to Fort Riley for basic training, who had known Gibson in Chicago, had intervened on behalf of the OCS candidates. Among the OCS applications Gibson facilitated was that of a young Jackie Robinson.

In 1943, Gibson acceded to the position of Chief Civilian Advisor to Secretary Stimson on Hastie's resignation. Perhaps Gibson’s greatest contribution as civilian aide was his role in the creation of the 1944 war propaganda film, The Negro Soldier. Produced by Frank Capra, the film portrayed black men as brave, intelligent, and patriotic. It was by far the highest quality film about black Americans yet made, with a propaganda message quite at odds with the demeaning black stereotypes common in Hollywood pictures. At Gibson’s prodding, the film was screened to all new recruits and played in cinemas across the country. For this and other service, Gibson was awarded the Legion of Merit in 1945.

In December 1946, Gibson was named to President Harry S. Truman's nine-member, civilian commission studying the future of universal military training; he was the panel's only black member. In May 1947, when it issued its report, the commission urged an end to segregation in the military. Fourteen months later, Truman issued Executive Order 9981, which led to desegregation of the armed forces.

== Boxing promoter ==
Gibson returned to private law practice in Chicago after the war. After helping Joe Louis with tax problems in 1949, Gibson took on the role of director and secretary of Joe Louis Enterprises, and entered the world of professional boxing as a manager and promoter. Gibson became secretary and later president of the International Boxing Club (IBC), which promoted important title fights and arranged national television coverage of the sport during the 1950s. In 1959, Gibson became one of the three original directors of the Chicago-based National Boxing Enterprises, the company that brought the legendary Friday night fights to television.

But legal troubles followed. The IBC was dissolved after the Supreme Court ruled in 1959 that it had violated antitrust law. Two years later, Gibson and four co-defendants – Frankie Carbo, once described by the New York district attorney's office as "the underworld czar of boxing", Louis Tom Dragna, Joe Sica, and Frank Palermo – were convicted in federal court of conspiracy and extortion in an effort to siphon off earnings from the welterweight champion Don Jordan. Gibson was sentenced to five years' probation and fined.

In 1957 then Teamsters Vice President Jimmy Hoffa was on trial for bribery. Given that the jury was composed of eight blacks and four whites, Hoffa made overtures to the black jurors. Paul Dorfman and Barney Baker arranged for boxer Joe Louis to walk up and hug Hoffa in view of the jurors. Hoffa was found not guilty. Dorfman approached Gibson, who was a friend of his, to make this arrangement, while Baker paid Louis' travel and hotel expenses.

== Later life and legacy ==
By the early 1960s, Gibson abandoned boxing and went into private practice. Over the years, he worked with the School for Automotive Trades in Chicago and acted as secretary of the Chicago Land Clearance Commission. He served on the boards of directors of the Chicago Community Fund and Roosevelt University and remained a member of the Cook County Bar Association. Gibson continued to reside in Chicago and practiced law up until his death on December 23, 2005.

Gibson is honored with a sidewalk plaque near the Victory Monument in Chicago's Bronzeville neighborhood; he shares the plaque with his father.
