= Dusty Miller (Teamsters) =

Teamsters official

Murray W. "Dusty" Miller was an International Brotherhood of Teamsters official and one-time ally of Jimmy Hoffa.

== Biography ==
Miller was born in Columbus, Indiana, later residing in Dallas, Texas. He was the chairman of the Southern Conference of Teamsters. As such he was in charge of Teamsters operations in cities like Dallas, New Orleans, and Nashville. In 1957 Jimmy Hoffa made him the vice-president of the Teamsters at large.

In 1963 Hoffa began to suspect that one of his associates was an informer for the federal government. One figure he suspected was Edward Partin, who was in fact doing so. On 7 November 1963 Miller called and made an appointment to see Walter Sheridan, aide to Attorney General Robert F. Kennedy. Towards the end of their meeting Miller brought up Partin and questioned why he hadn't been prosecuted yet despite his indictment. Sheridan recalls that, "He had been trying to feel us out about Partin...we had passed the test....we felt it was likely that they were checking out different people".

On 8 November 1963, Miller was phoned by Jack Ruby, later infamous for shooting Lee Harvey Oswald. He reached Miller at 4:48 PM at the Eden Roc Hotel, the call lasted only 4 minutes. He was later interviewed by the FBI, whom he told that Ruby was looking for help in his dispute with the American Guild of Variety Artists.

Miller was favored by Hoffa's successor Frank Fitzsimmons, giving him greater power in the union. Fitzsimmons made Miller Secretary-Treasurer, over the objections of Hoffa who favored Harold J. Gibbons. Hoffa felt betrayed by Miller, stating "I made that motherfucker. I took him from nothing and I made him an international organizer.... he dumped me and he went with Fitz because Fitz made him secretary-treasurer over the fact that I wanted Harold...Fitz appointed Dusty and Dusty wouldn’t step down even when I told him to". Hoffa pledged to retake the union presidency and to "clean house" when he did so. Miller was number three on Hoffa's list of people who was "gonna go".

In June 1972 the publication Overdrive published an article alleging that Miller had stolen $1.6 million from the Teamsters Central States Pension Fund. Miller sued for libel. In October 1975, Miller received media attention after he competed in a golf tournament at La Costa Country Club in Carlsbad, California with the recently resigned US President Richard Nixon and other Teamsters officials. Nixon was presented with a trophy before they retired to the clubhouse for drinks and conversation.

He announced his resignation as Secretary-Treasurer in January 1976, being replaced by Ray Schoessling. Miller was not well liked by staff, he was greatly displeased by salary raise and vacation requests.
