= Joe Esposito (politician) =

Chicago mobster and politician (1871–1928)

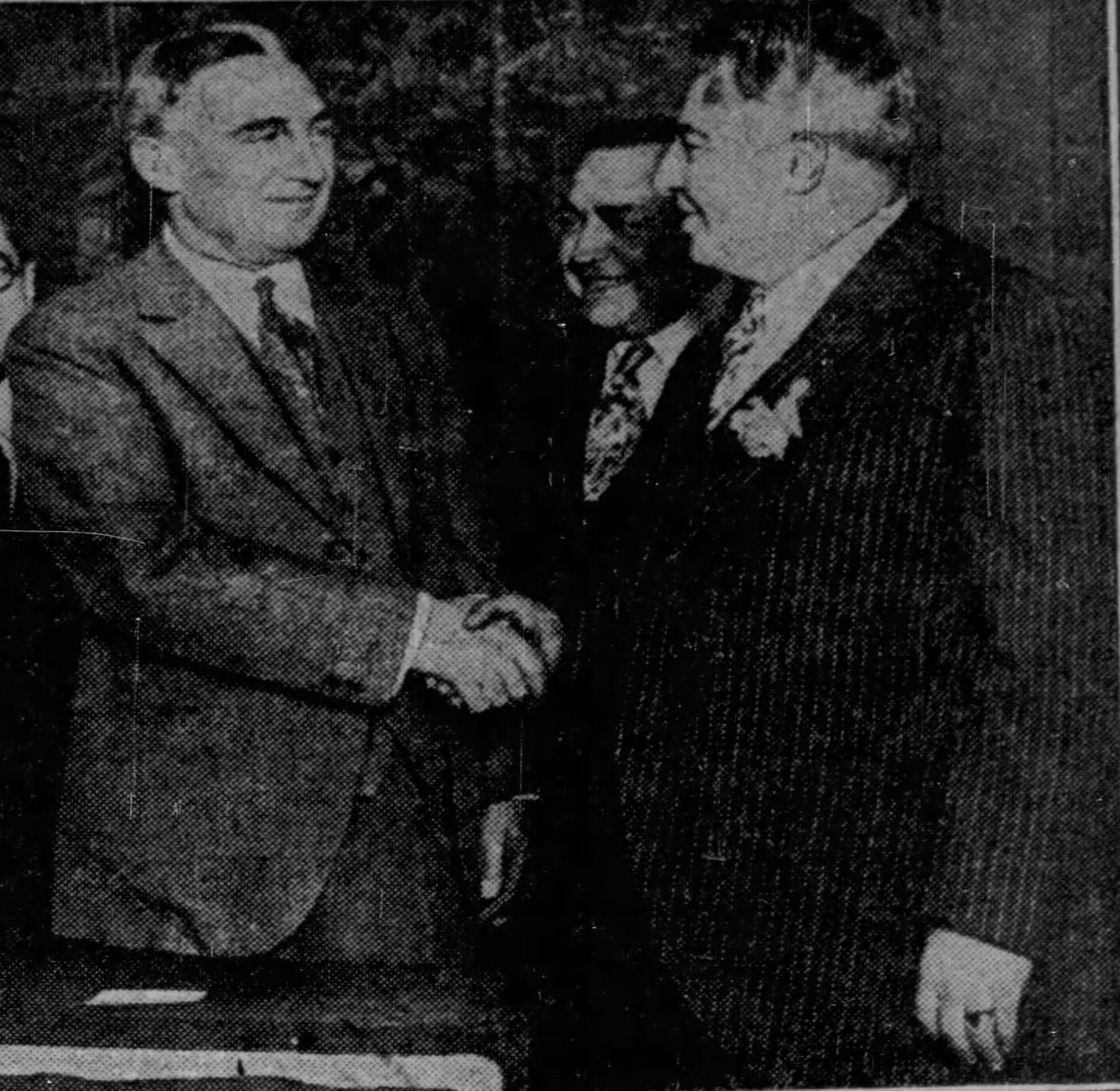

Chicago, Illinois, Nineteenth Ward, Alderman
- In office 1920–1928

Personal details
- Born: Giuseppe Esposito; October 6, 1871 Acerra, Campania, Italy
- Died: March 21, 1928 (aged 56) Chicago, Illinois, U.S.
- Party: Republican
- Occupation: Politician, racketeer, bootlegger
- Nickname: Diamond Joe

Joseph Esposito (born Giuseppe Esposito, Italian pronunciation: [dʒuˈzɛppe eˈspɔːzito], October 6, 1871 – March 21, 1928) was an American politician best known for his involvement in bootlegging, extortion, prostitution, and labor racketeering in Chicago, Illinois, during the Prohibition era.

== Early life ==
Esposito was born on October 6, 1871, in Acerra, Campania, Italy. He immigrated to Illinois and joined one of the street gangs terrorizing Chicago's Little Italy during the early 1900s. When the Volstead Act was enacted and Prohibition in the United States began, Esposito's organization, the 42 Gang, which included Sam "Momo" Giancana and Paul "The Waiter" Ricca, entered into bootlegging. Esposito's early success with the Genna Brothers may have been a factor in the 1920 murder of rival James "Big Jim" Colosimo, a long time racketeer who had been hesitant to begin his own bootlegging operations.

== Rise to power and politics ==
By the early 1920s, Esposito earned another nickname, Diamond Joe, due to his frequent wearing of diamond cufflinks, diamond rings, and other jewelry. Esposito had become a Republican ward boss of the Nineteenth Ward in Chicago. He was one of the earliest Italian Americans elected as aldermen. Esposito provided political protection to the bootlegging gangs of Chicago's Italian communities, including the South Side gang of mob boss Johnny Torrio and the Genna brothers. In May 1921, Esposito famously attended the funeral of his political protégé Antonio D'Andrea. Several years later, Esposito also attended the funeral of another criminal ally, Angelo Genna murdered on May 25, 1925.

== Rivalry with Al Capone and death ==
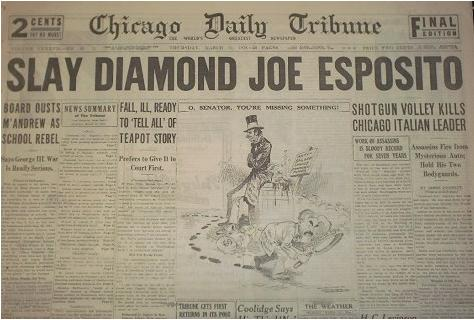
Newspaper headline for Esposito's death

After Torrio retired, Esposito was a rival of his old gang, now led by Al Capone and known as the Chicago Outfit, and on March 21, 1928, Esposito was attacked and killed in a drive-by shooting on his front steps, with his two nieces right inside the house.

== See also ==
- List of homicides in Illinois § Organized crime
