= Council Plaza =

- U.S. National Register of Historic Places
- U.S. Historic district
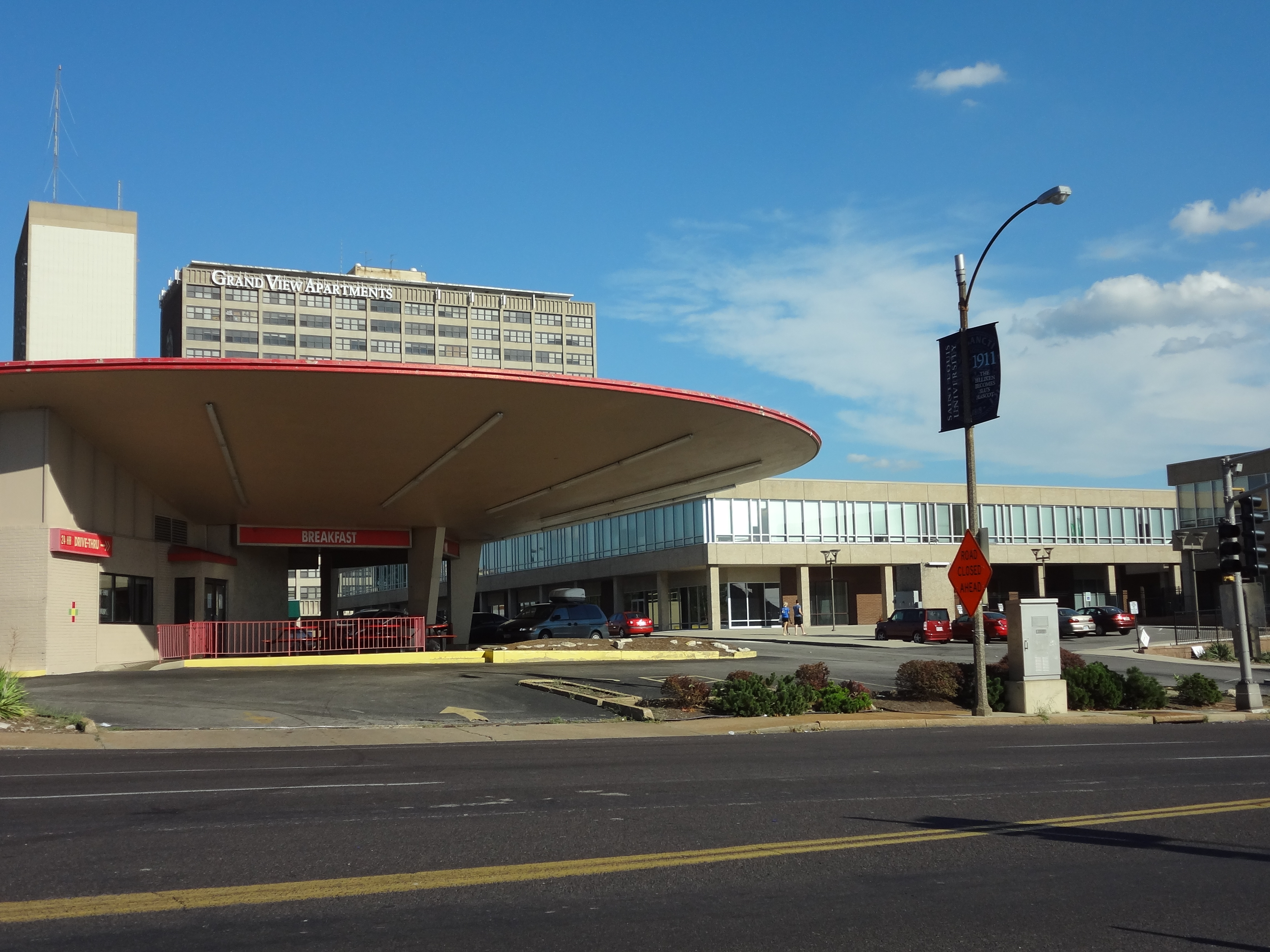
- Council Plaza in 2011. "The Saucer" is now a Starbucks and Chipotle.

- Location within St. Louis Location within Missouri Location within the United States
- Location: 300 S. Grand Blvd., 212 S. Grand Blvd., 310 S. Grand Blvd., St. Louis, Missouri
- Coordinates: 38.63265°N 90.23391°W
- Area: 9 acres (3.6 ha)
- Built: 1968
- Architect: Schwartz and Van Hoeffen
- Architectural style: Modern Movement
- NRHP reference No.: 06000217
- Added to NRHP: March 2, 2007

Council Plaza is a housing development in St. Louis, Missouri. Located adjacent to the campus of Saint Louis University, it was built between 1964 and 1968 as a public housing development primarily for the elderly. The principal buildings of the complex are two high-rise apartment buildings, now called Grand View Tower Apartments and Council Tower Senior Apartments. The complex has been listed on the National Register of Historic Places since 2007.

== History ==
Before Grand Center rose to become an entertainment district in St. Louis, the area was a residential neighborhood located just west of the original core of the city. In the years after World War II, civic leaders regarded decaying neighborhoods to be the city's biggest postwar problem. During this time in 1954, Mayor Raymond R. Tucker announced plans for the demolition of the Mill Creek Valley, which was destroyed in 1959 into what locals called the Hiroshima Flats. The area never attracted the investment that the mayor had thought and now Harris-Stowe and St. Louis University occupy the majority of the land.

The Council Plaza housing development, built with financing and support from Teamsters Local 688 and its leader, Harold J. Gibbons, transformed the Grand Center area in the 1950s and 60s. The two apartment towers, the 16-story Council Tower West (now Midtown 300 Apartments) and the 27-story Council Tower East (now the Council Tower Senior Apartments) were two of the first developments built in the Mill Creek Valley. This area became known as Council Plaza. The Council Tower Senior Apartments building is still one of the tallest residential structures in the metropolitan area; in 2011 this building, then "largely vacant", was sold and the new owner began an extensive renovation, including renovation of the 260 foot high sculpture that covers the tower's east façade.

The filling station building was built in 1967 based on a design by architect Richard Henmi. It was originally a Phillips 66 station, and later became a Del Taco restaurant. In 1967, the Phillips 66 was known for its bat-wing model, consisting of four tapered columns supporting a tapered round roof. The building came to house Starbucks and Chipotle with a project cost about $1.5 million.
