= Richard Kavner =

Teamsters official

Richard Kavner was a trade union official in the International Brotherhood of Teamsters who worked under Jimmy Hoffa.

== Biography ==
Originally from New York City, Kavner was a United Retail Wholesale and Department Store Employees of America (URWDSEA) organizer there. He later came to St. Louis, Missouri where he aligned himself with Harold J. Gibbons, becoming one of his closest allies. In 1948 they organized a strike against the JH Grady Company, which led to violent clashes and 100 arrests, Kavner was beaten up. He was later indicted on extortion charges under the Hobbs Act due to a December 1953 strike against Yellow Cab. The charges were later dismissed.

At Kavner's suggestion Gibbons sought out an alliance with Jimmy Hoffa of the Teamsters union. When Gibbons aligned himself with Hoffa, he brought Kavner to Washington to work for the Teamsters. He became a general organizer and worked as an assistant to Hoffa. One of Hoffa's biographers describes Kavner as a "troubleshooter" for Hoffa.

In 1953 Hoffa was facing pressure from a Senate subcommittee investigation. On Hoffa's behalf Kavner and Barney Baker approached the former Kansas governor Payne Ratner to intercede with Chairman Wint Smith. Ratner successfully convinced Smith to ease off investigating Hoffa. Kavner was summoned to testify before the McClellan Committee of the US Senate (1957-60). Although he managed to avoid the committee for some time, proclaiming that he was "sick", he was eventually brought before the committee. Chief Counsel Bobby Kennedy pointed out that at the same time when Kavner was claiming to be "sick", he was “in Puerto Rico on Teamster business”. Kavner's attorney Morris Shenker, told the committee that “whenever [Kavner] is under emotional strain, he is subject to attacks which consist of a sudden loss of consciousness followed by severe sweating and pain".

Harold J. Gibbons and Hoffa had a falling out in November 1963 over the Teamsters response to the assassination of John F. Kennedy. When Gibbons heard the news he lowered the flag at Teamsters headquarters to half-mast and composed a statement of condolences. Hoffa, who intensely disliked the Kennedy brothers, was furious about this, asking Gibbons "Why the hell did you do that for him? Who the hell was he?". He told Hoffa "Listen, when you get back here, you can get yourself a new boy". Gibbons decided to resign as Hoffa's executive assistant effective 1 January. Kavner and others whom Gibbons had brought with him from St. Louis to work for Hoffa followed suit and also resigned. At first Hoffa denied they had resigned, but later stated they had done so because they wanted to return to their local unions.
