= Paul Ricca =

Italian-American mobster

- Ricca's mugshot
- Born: Felice De Lucia; November 14, 1897; Naples, Campania, Kingdom of Italy
- Died: October 11, 1972 (aged 74); Chicago, Illinois, U.S.
- Other names: The Waiter; Paul Maglio
- Occupation: Crime boss
- Spouse: Nancy Gigante (m. 1927)
- Children: 3
- Allegiance: Chicago Outfit
- Convictions: Murder (1917); Extortion (1943); Tax evasion (1959)
- Criminal charges: Tax evasion (1965)
- Penalty: 2 years imprisonment 10 years imprisonment 9 years imprisonment 27 months served

Paul De Lucia (born Felice De Lucia, Italian: [feˈliːtʃe de luˈtʃiːa]; November 14, 1897 – October 11, 1972), known as Paul Ricca (/ˈriːkə/, Italian: [ˈrikka]), was an Italian-American mobster who served as the alleged nominal or de facto leader of the Chicago Outfit for 40 years. In 1958 he was named "the country's most important criminal" by a Senate crime investigating subcommittee. Ricca died on October 11, 1972.

== Early life ==
Ricca was born Felice De Lucia on November 14, 1897, in Naples, Campania to Antonio and Maria Annunziata De Lucia. He had four younger sisters: Emilia Beatrice, Anna Clementina, Clementina Eleonora, and Luisa Maria. By age 17, he was working for organized crime in Naples (Camorra). In 1915, he stabbed Emilio Parrillo to death on Mafia orders. Ricca later claimed that he killed Parillo for breaking an engagement with his sister. In 1917, Ricca was convicted of murder, serving two years in prison. Once released from prison, Ricca killed Vincenzo Capasso, who had testified against him in the Parillo trial, by slitting his throat.

After killing Capasso, Ricca assumed the name Paul Maglio and fled to the United States through Cuba. On August 10, 1920, Ricca arrived in New York City.

In January 1927, Ricca married Nancy Emily Gigante, who was also from Naples, and had three children: Mary Anna, Anthony Paul, and Paul Richard. He became a naturalized U.S. citizen in 1928 and legally changed his name to Paul De Lucia.

== Joining the mob ==
While in Cuba, Ricca had met Joseph "Diamond Joe" Esposito, a Chicago bootlegger and restaurant owner. After Ricca arrived in New York, Esposito brought him to Chicago, where he put him to work smuggling whiskey from Cuba and moonshine liquor from Kentucky to Chicago. Sensing Ricca's potential, Esposito appointed him as maitre d' at the Bella Napoli, Esposito's Chicago restaurant, earning him the nickname "the Waiter." The Bella Napoli was popular with many Chicago gangsters, including the leader of the South Side Gang (the precursor to the Chicago Outfit), Al Capone. Sharing several mutual friends among Neapolitan gangsters who had returned to Italy, Ricca soon quit his restaurant job and joined the South Side Gang.

== Working with Capone and Nitti ==
Ricca advanced very quickly in the gang ranks. An early event that contributed to his rise occurred outside Capone's headquarters in the Hawthorne Hotel in Cicero, Illinois, on September 20, 1926. While Capone was eating in the restaurant next to the hotel, and as Ricca was about to enter the same restaurant to meet with him, several vehicles being driven by North Side gangsters, Capone's rivals, began firing several Thompson submachine gun rounds into the air and at the hotel. Ricca, recognizing the oncoming danger, quickly ran to where Capone was sitting and warned him just in time for Capone to get down, saving him from getting shot. Ricca sustained a gunshot wound to his left shoulder and, when asked by the police for his name, identified himself with an alias, Louis Barko.

Capone responded by praising Ricca. The two soon became good friends; in 1927, Capone served as the best man at Ricca's wedding.

In 1929, Capone and Ricca attended the Atlantic City Conference in Atlantic City, New Jersey, the first meeting of all the major criminal gangs in the United States. In 1930, Capone sent Ricca to New York City to serve as his emissary in peace talks aimed at ending the Castellammarese War between the New York Italian-American gangs. Ricca's prestige and visibility continued to rise with the establishment of the National Crime Syndicate in 1931.

In 1931, Capone was convicted of tax evasion and sentenced to 11 years in prison. Capone's nominal successor was Frank "the Enforcer" Nitti, with Ricca as his underboss. However, according to crime historian Carl Sifakis, Ricca held the actual power in the Outfit. Ricca frequently overruled Nitti's orders, saying, "We'll do it this way. Now let's hear no more about it!" In addition, the leaders of the emerging Syndicate, including Lucky Luciano, dealt only with Ricca, not Nitti.

In April 1932, Luciano and Meyer Lansky, another top leader in the Crime Syndicate, were in the company of Ricca and other Chicago and New York gangsters when they were arrested by the police outside the Congress Hotel in Chicago. All the men arrested were freed since the police had no reason to keep them detained, but not before taking a picture of the gangsters in a police line-up. The fact that the East Coast leaders met with Ricca personally in Chicago demonstrates the New York mob's trust toward him as the leader of the Chicago mob.

Ricca was relatively soft-spoken but was as ruthless as any crime boss. Whenever he wanted someone rubbed out, he said, "Make-a him go away." Crime historian Joe Sifakis described him as one of the most stereotypical gangsters ever produced by the Chicago Outfit.

However, unlike his former bosses, Esposito and Capone, Ricca avoided the flamboyance and media attention-seeking that had helped bring about Esposito's and Capone's downfall, preferring to maintain a low profile to avoid attention from the media and law enforcement. Although he was arrested several times during his early years in the mob, including his January 24, 1927, arrest for carrying a concealed weapon, which was when his mugshot was taken, he was never convicted on any serious charges until the 1940s, and his mob associates expressed envy over his minor police record.

== Hollywood extortion case ==
In the early 1940s, Nitti convinced Ricca and the rest of the Outfit leadership to participate in a labor racketeering and extortion scheme aimed at the movie studios in Los Angeles, California. Chicago mobster John "Handsome Johnny" Roselli gained control of the Projectors Union and threatened the studios with strikes and other labor problems. To avoid labor unrest, RKO, Paramount, MGM and 20th Century Fox paid several hundred thousand dollars to the Outfit. However, two Outfit men Willie Bioff and George Browne were arrested for extortion and agreed to testify against the Outfit leadership. In March 1943, Ricca, Nitti, and other mob leaders were indicted for extortion.

On March 18, 1943, Ricca and the Outfit leadership met with Nitti. Since the movie studio racket was Nitti's idea, Ricca and the Outfit leaders demanded that Nitti plead guilty to extortion charges to save them from prison. Terrified at the prospect of prison due to his severe claustrophobia, Nitti shot himself to death the next day. Ricca now became the official boss of the Outfit, with enforcement chief Tony Accardo as underboss. Ricca and Accardo would run the Outfit for the next 30 years.

Through Paul Dorfman, Ricca met Jimmy Hoffa. In 1956 the Teamsters purchased a house for Ricca, ostensibly for the purpose of turning it into a training center for Teamsters business agents. Nobody was ever trained. Hoffa hired the lawyer Frank Ragano after Florida boss Santo Trafficante Jr. suggested Ragano to Ricca as somebody who could aid Hoffa's defense.

== Extortion conviction ==
On December 30, 1943, Ricca and his associates were convicted of extortion and sentenced to ten years each in federal prison. Ricca began his sentence at the federal penitentiary in Atlanta but was soon lobbying for a transfer to Leavenworth Penitentiary in Kansas. The Atlanta warden, reportedly prejudiced against Italians, had severely beaten Outfit mobster Phil D'Andrea, making Ricca and the others fearful for their lives. After a series of contacts, St. Louis, Missouri, lawyer Paul Dillon allegedly offered the head of the federal parole board payment to approve a transfer to Leavenworth for the Outfit mobster.

In May 1945, against the recommendations of both wardens, Ricca and the other mobsters were moved to Leavenworth. During this period, the U.S. Internal Revenue Service (IRS) accepted a cash settlement from Ricca for back taxes. On August 13, 1947, after a one-week deliberation, the parole board released Ricca and his co-defendants from prison on parole. However, as a condition of his parole, Ricca could not contact mobsters.

Accardo, therefore, replaced Ricca as boss. It was generally acknowledged, though, that Accardo shared power with Ricca, who stayed in the background. No significant transactions, and certainly no hits, took place without Ricca's knowledge. It was one of the few known instances of a power-sharing arrangement in organized crime.

== Ricca and Giancana ==
As the 1950s began, Ricca started passing more of the responsibility for the day-to-day operation of the Outfit to Accardo. However, in 1957, Ricca suddenly told Accardo that he wanted Sam Giancana, a Ricca protégé, to take Accardo's position. Accardo was facing tax evasion charges, and Ricca allegedly wanted him to disappear from public view.

Although unhappy about the demotion, Accardo accepted it, joining Ricca in semi-retirement. However, it was understood that Giancana had to get Accardo and Ricca's approval for all significant transactions, particularly hits. By staying in the background, Ricca and Accardo avoided further imprisonment far longer than Capone had.

As Ricca aged, Accardo began to make more high-level decisions, ultimately pushing Giancana out in favor of Sam Battaglia in 1966.

== Later years ==
In 1957, the federal government charged Ricca with illegally entering the United States under the alias Paul Maglio. Three years earlier, the government had located the real Paul Maglio in Chicago and brought him to testify against Ricca, whose citizenship was revoked. Although the government won a deportation order, it was later overturned.

In 1959, Ricca was convicted of tax evasion and sentenced to nine years in federal prison. After serving 27 months of his sentence, Ricca was released. In 1965, Ricca was again indicted for tax evasion. In court, Ricca maintained that his total income for 1963, $80,159, was earned at the race track. Ricca was eventually acquitted.

Ricca died of a heart attack on October 11, 1972, at St. Luke's Hospital in Chicago.

== In popular culture ==
- In the AMC series The Making of the Mob: New York, Ricca is portrayed by Christopher Valente.

American Mafia
Preceded by Frank Nitti	Chicago Outfit; Boss; 1943–1947	Succeeded by Tony Accardo
Preceded by Charles Fischetti	Chicago Outfit; Consigliere; 1947–1957	Succeeded by Angelo J. LaPietra
