= Bill Decker (sheriff) =

Sheriff in Texas (1949)

Sheriff of Dallas County
- In office 1949–1970

Personal details
- Born: James Eric Decker
- Occupation: Law enforcement officer
- Known for: Sheriff of Dallas County; involvement in the Bonnie and Clyde ambush; arrest of Raymond Hamilton
- Nickname: Bill

James Eric "Bill" Decker was the Sheriff of the Dallas County police from 1949 till 1970. He was involved in the capture of Bonnie and Clyde and later present at the head of the motorcade during the assassination of John F. Kennedy.

== Biography ==
The son of a saloon owner on Griffin Street, Decker was a high school dropout. He started out as a court clerk in a courthouse. In 1921 he joined the Dallas branch of the Ku Klux Klan. In 1924 he was made chief deputy constable of Dallas County. He later served as chief deputy sheriff for Dallas County for fourteen years before he was elected sheriff. He was sworn in on 2 January 1949.

In April 1934, after a nine month long manhunt, Decker captured a messenger sent by the gangster Raymond Hamilton to his sister, which indicated Hamilton's location. He apprehend Hamilton hiding out at a railyard. He also played a role in the ambush that led to the deaths of Bonnie and Clyde on 23 May 1934. He had his first run-in with Clyde and his elder brother Buck when he arrested them for the theft of brass from a West Dallas company. Floyd Hamilton, brother of Raymond, spent time in Alcatraz for harboring Bonnie and Clyde before being released in 1958. Decker and Ted Hinton helped him secure a job at a Dallas car dealership where he worked until he retired.

=== Organized crime relationship ===
A common practice in Texas at the time was that criminals would be "housed" in one county and did their criminal dealings in another. The arrangement was that the criminal would provide the local sheriff with information and refuse to participate in criminal activity in that sheriff's county, in exchange the criminal would be left alone by the sheriff. Decker was particularly unpopular with sheriffs in East Texas for this reason. Sheriff Frank Brunt of Cherokee County complained that "Anytime I had a safe knocked....you could bet they were out of Dallas. There was a gang of 'em, and Dallas was full of 'em–they wouldn't bother Bill Decker, he had an understanding".

Decker was close to Benny Binion, who said that he and Decker were simply "goddamn good friends". He denied ever bribing Decker, stating that "I never give him a dollar, never give him nothing. Never bought him a hat, never give him nothing". Decker allowed Binion's criminal operations to go on unhindered, Binion admitted that Decker "never bothered me in my operations no way, shape or form". They had a mutually beneficial relationship; whenever Binion wanted rivals shut down he called Decker, and whenever Decker wanted somebody run out of Dallas he called Binion. When Decker won the sheriff's election 1948, his campaign was financed by Binion who stated "Maybe I put up something like $3,500. No strings attached to that money. I just give it to him for old times sake".

On 5 October 1931 Binion shot a black bootlegger following an argument. He immediately phoned Decker who he told "I just shot a nigger in my back yard. He come at me with a knife". Decker told him to stand guard over the body and make sure it was not interfered with. Both Decker and the ambulance driver testified that when they arrived at the scene a five inch switchblade was found beside the man's hand. However Binion pled guilty to murder and received a two-year suspended sentence. In the 1940s the Chicago Outfit attempted to make in-roads into the Dallas gambling scene which meant they had to push out Binion and win over the local police who propped him up. Paul Roland Jones was dispatched to Dallas to try and strike a deal with the local police but he was caught in a sting. After the jailing of Jones, the Outfit sent more men, among them Paul Labriola, to continue their efforts. However they were intercepted as they stepped off the plane by Decker and Captain J. W. Fritz who deported them.

He also had a collaborative relationship with the Dallas mafia. When Joseph Civello was jailed for fifteen years he got out after six on an early parole recommendation by Decker. When Decker was set to step down as Dallas County Sheriff, Joseph Campisi hoped that Clarence Jones would serve as his replacement, as it would have meant that his bookmaking operations could have continued unhindered.

=== John F. Kennedy assassination ===
Decker was present during the assassination of John F. Kennedy: he rode with Chief of the Dallas PD Jesse Curry in a car at the front of the presidential motorcade as it turned into Dealey Plaza where Kennedy would be shot. As they were heading to the hospital he ordered by radio that they "move all men available out of my department back into the railroad yards there in an effort to try to determine just what and when it happened down there, and hold everything secure until the homicide and other investigators should get there".

Decker defended the conduct of the police when Lee Harvey Oswald was murdered in their custody. He stated that they "did everything humanly possible" to protect him, as they had done for President Kennedy. He added "If someone is determined to commit murder, it's almost impossible to stop him." Decker was supposed to have taken custody of Oswald, but instead gained custody of his murderer Jack Ruby.

== Later Life ==
In 1970, Decker resigned from the police department due to poor health. He died on 22 August 1970 in Baylor Hospital, a few days before his 72nd birthday. In February 1971, Dallas County Commissioners voted for the Dallas County Historical Plaza to be dedicated to Decker and all county officers killed in the line of duty.
