= Paul Labriola =

- Born: Chicago, Illinois, U.S.
- Died: 1954; Chicago, Illinois, U.S.
- Other name: "Needle Nose"
- Occupation: Mobster
- Relatives: Lawrence Mangano (step-father)
- Allegiance: Chicago Outfit

Paul "Needle Nose" Labriola was an American gangster associated with the Chicago Outfit. He ran a crew with his close friend James Weinberg. Both were found drugged and strangled in the trunk of a car in 1954.

== Biography ==
Labriola was the step son of Lawrence Mangano. He attained the nickname "Needle Nose" when it was given to him by the Chicago Sun-Times reporter Virginia Marmaduke owing to his pointy nose. He ran a notorious crew that consisted of gangsters like James "Jimmy" Weinberg and Martin "Marty the Ox" Ochs.

Labriola was questioned by police over the 1946 kidnapping of Ed Jones. According to one source Labriola was one of the gunmen, along with Fiore Buccieri and Vicent Ioli, who had kidnapped Jones, while Lenny Caifano and future boss Sam Giancana were the getaway drivers.

In the 1940s the Outfit sent Paul Roland Jones and others down to Dallas, Texas to take over the gambling racket. Later in summer 1946 Labriola, Weinberg and others were sent as back-up. However they were quickly picked up and arrested by Sheriff Bill Decker and Captain Will Fritz. Labriola and his crew were fined $1 and charged with vagrancy. They were subsequently sent back across state lines. Labriola is reported to have known Jack Ruby, another Chicagoan who went to Dallas, later to shoot Lee Harvey Oswald.

On 7 September 1946 Labriola was involved in a high-speed chase and shootout with Theodore Roe, who got away. On 6 January 1947 Labriola, Peanuts Panczko, and Steve Tomaras were arrested and charged with disorderly conduct. When arrested they discovered that they were suspects in the murder of Otto Freund, a printing company executive who was stabbed and beaten by home invaders. Although after a lie detector test all were released.

In 1952 a gambling raid on the offices of Ralph Berger resulted in the arrest of Labriola and onetime Al Capone lawyer Abraham Teitelbaum who was then the attorney for Chicago mob boss Tony Accardo. He was also questioned by police in relation to the August 1952 murder of Theodore Roe. At some point Labriola and Teitelbaum had a falling out, he and Weinberg threatened to throw him out of his office window.

On the orders of Accardo, Labriola and Weinberg organized Cook County Licensed Beverage Dealers Association, the purpose of which was to rival the Chicago Restaurant Association and shake down tavern owners.

In 1954 Labriola and Weinberg were found drugged and strangled in the trunk of an abandoned car. Sam Mesi was considered by police as a suspect in their murder. Although dead by the time of the US Senate's investigation into organized crime, the McClellan Committee, Labriola was nonetheless a subject of discussion. Mobsters Ross Prio, Marshall Caifano and mafia boss Tony Accardo were all questioned about Labriola.
