= Ruby and Oswald =

1978 television film directed by Mel Stuart

- Genre: Drama; History
- Written by: John McGreevey; Michael McGreevey
- Directed by: Mel Stuart
- Starring: Michael Lerner; Frederic Forrest
- Country of origin: United States
- Original language: English

Production
- Executive producers: Alan Landsburg; Howard Lipstone
- Producer: Paul Freeman
- Production location: Dallas
- Cinematography: Matthew F. Leonetti
- Editors: Corky Ehlers; George Hively
- Running time: 180 minutes
- Production company: Alan Landsburg Productions

Original release
- Network: CBS
- Release: February 8, 1978

Ruby and Oswald is a 1978 American television movie about the assassination of United States President John F. Kennedy. It stars Michael Lerner and Frederic Forrest.

== Overview ==
Jack Ruby (Michael Lerner) is a warm-hearted but hot-tempered and patriotic nightclub owner, who loves President Kennedy. Lee Harvey Oswald (Frederic Forrest), a troubled loner with a speckled past is looking to merely acquire fame. On November 22, Oswald kills the president. On the 24th, Ruby kills Oswald, being motivated exclusively by his love for the president.

== Cast ==
- Michael Lerner as Jack Ruby
- Frederic Forrest as Lee Harvey Oswald
- Lou Frizzell as Captain J. W. Fritz
- Doris Roberts as Eva
- Lanna Saunders as Marina Oswald
- Bruce French as Robert Oswald
- Sandy McPeak as Henry Wade
- Sandy Ward as Jesse Curry
- Brian Dennehy as George Paulsen
- Michael Pataki as Ike Pappas
- Richard Sanders as Agent Kelley
- Gordon Jump as Clyde Gaydosh
- Gwynne Gilford as Little Lyn
- Hillel Silverman as Himself
- Jim Leavelle as Himself

== Reviews ==
Journalist Jeremiah O'Leary witnessed Ruby's shooting of Oswald in the basement of Dallas Police headquarters on November 24, 1963. In a review for The Washington Times, O'Leary wrote: "The actors and the director succeeded only in making a bore of a weekend that was as exciting as it was horrible."

== See also ==
- Ruby, a 1992 film about Jack Ruby
- Assassination of John F. Kennedy in popular culture
