= Marshall Caifano =

American mobster (1911–2003)

- Caifano mugshot
- Born: Marcello Giuseppe Caifano; July 19, 1911; New York City, New York, U.S.
- Died: September 6, 2003 (aged 92); Fort Lauderdale, Florida, U.S.
- Other names: "John Marshall"; "Shoes"
- Occupation: Mobster
- Allegiance: Chicago Outfit
- Convictions: Extortion (1964); Stock fraud (1980)
- Penalty: 10 years' imprisonment (1964); 20 years' imprisonment (1980)

Marshall Joseph Caifano (born Marcello Giuseppe Caifano; July 19, 1911 – September 6, 2003) was an American mobster who became a high-ranking member of the Chicago Outfit in Las Vegas.

== Early life ==
Caifano was born on July 19, 1911, in New York, and migrated to Chicago in the 1920s where he became affiliated with the Chicago Outfit and mobster Paul Ricca. He was a boxer in his youth. Caifano was a short man who wore shoe lifts, earning him the nickname "Shoes".

== Criminal career ==
In the 1940s, Caifano was sent to Los Angeles. According to author Gus Russo, Bugsy Siegel, who was building a gambling establishment in Las Vegas, was at Virginia Hill's Beverly Hills home with Caifano associate Alan Smiley when another man arrived; Siegel was shot to death, and soon after Gus Greenbaum, the Chicago Outfit's chief Nevada bookie, arrived at Siegel's Flamingo Hotel in Las Vegas and said, "We're taking over."

In 1943, Nick Circella, Caifano's associate, was tried for extortion of his girlfriend, Estelle Cary, who was about to testify against him until her burned and stabbed body was later found. Caifano was suspected of the murder, but the case was never solved; he was also suspected of several other unsolved killings, including the 1950 murder of former Chicago Police Lt. William Drury, the 1952 strangulation of mobster "Russian Louie" Strauss, and the 1973 shotgun slaying of mobbed up former police officer Richard Cain.

In the early 1950s, the Outfit moved in on the highly profitable illegal gambling business of African-American organized crime figure Theodore Roe, and tried to kidnap him, but Roe fatally shot Caifano's brother "Fat Lenny" during the botched kidnapping attempt in 1951. Roe was tried, but was acquitted based after proving he acted in self-defense, but a year later, Roe was shotgunned to death outside his home; Caifano and Giancana were questioned but were never charged.

In 1958 Caifano testified before the US Senate's McClellan Committee. He was quizzed about his connections to Paul Labriola. Caifano invoked the Fifth amendment, leading to a citation for contempt of congress.

Caifano was selected by Tony Accardo and Sam Giancana in the late 1950s to oversee the Outfit's operations in Las Vegas. After El Rancho Vegas resort was burned down in a fire in 1960, Caifano was replaced by Johnny Roselli as the Outfit's senior mobster in the city. Caifano was one of the first 11 persons listed in the Nevada casino "Black Book" in 1960.

In 1964, Caifano was convicted of extorting $60,000 from oilman Ray Ryan, who testified against him. The conviction was upheld in 1966, and Caifano was sentenced to 10 years in prison. Caifano was sentenced to a further 12 years in prison, in 1967, for defrauding a lumber dealer of $42,000. When Caifano was released from prison in the 1970s, Ryan reportedly offered him $1 million in restitution, however, in 1977, Ryan was killed in a car bomb; no one was charged in the murder. In 1980, Caifano was sentenced to 20 years for fencing stolen stock certificates.

== Death ==
Caifano was released from prison in 1991 and subsequently moved to Fort Lauderdale, Florida, where he died of natural causes on September 6, 2003, aged 92.
