= Divorcees Anonymous =

Divorcees Anonymous was an organization in the United States which received notable press attention in the 1950s. The group's goal was to prevent divorce, primarily by teaching women to win back or change their husbands, reflecting the societal views of the time.

== History ==
The group was founded in 1949 by Samuel Starr, a Chicago divorce attorney who believed almost all divorced couples regretted that decision. The name, without a doubt, derived from organizations as Alcoholics Anonymous. According to Starr, the group started when he was loath to take on a new divorce case for a prospective client couple, believing them to be focused only on "some little peeves." His next client that day was a regretful divorcee, who either at her own suggestion or Starr's, successfully counseled the couple to remain together. Starr then recruited other divorced female clients to do the same work, and the group grew from five members to 100 within a month. The organization was profiled in the February 1950 issues of Good Housekeeping and Redbook, the latter of which was condensed and reprinted in Reader's Digest in May 1950.

By 1956, the group had claimed to have "saved" 3,000 marriages. Starr moved into a smaller office in 1959, claiming his divorce business had dropped by 75 percent. In 1961, it was reported that "DA" had 30 chapters across the United States.

== In popular culture ==
A 1957 episode of Armstrong Circle Theatre, also titled "Divorcees Anonymous," featured two women (played by Bibi Osterwald and June Dayton) who try to persuade a third woman not to divorce. Frank Overton played Sam Starr.

== Legacy ==
Divorcees Anonymous dropped from press reports during the 1960s, and has received little attention since that time. Historian Kristin Celello's 2009 book Making Marriage Work: A History of Marriage and Divorce in the Twentieth-Century United States provides a brief history of DA. Cellelo notes that marriage counseling views which developed in the 1960s and 1970s, including that some marriages are better off ended, reflected a great change from the goals of Divorcees Anonymous.
