= Sam Mesi =

Chicago mobster

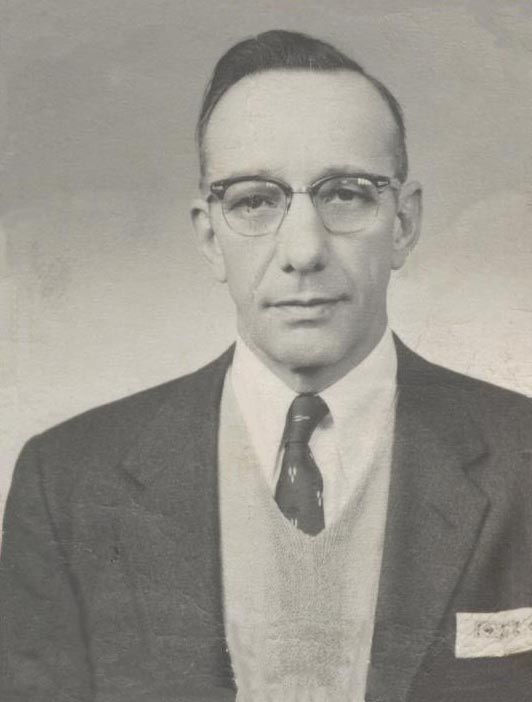
Sam Mesi in Chicago 1950/55

Salvatore "Sam" Mesi (June 28, 1900 - March, 1971) was a Chicago mobster with the Chicago Outfit criminal organization who was a bookmaker, hitman and Chicago city employee.

Suspected in at least four gangland slayings, Mesi operated three off track betting parlors on Chicago's Westside and was associated with Outfit boss Tony Accardo. Mesi was the brother of Philip Mesi, Sr., and uncle of Philip Mesi, Jr.. Sponsored by Twenty-Sixth Ward committeeman Matthew Biesczat, Mesi was hired as a foreman in the city's sanitation department as a reward for his work in the 1959 city elections for the ward alderman and mayor, Richard J. Daley.

Mesi was one of many organized crime figures found to be Chicago city employees by the Chicago Crime Commission. When questioned by authorities, Biesczat claimed he just wanted to give Mesi, a convicted criminal, a legitimate job. Although city officials denied knowledge of his prior arrests, Mesi stated, "A record like mine, you can't hide. The city knew about it when they hired me." Mesi was taken into custody where he was fingerprinted and his arrest record forwarded to the City Commissioner of Streets and Sanitation; however. the commissioner apparently never received it.

Mesi was considered by police as a suspect in the drugging and strangling of Paul Labriola and James Weinberg in 1954.

In 1971, Sam Mesi died of emphysema.
