= Alice Backes =

American actress (1923–2007)

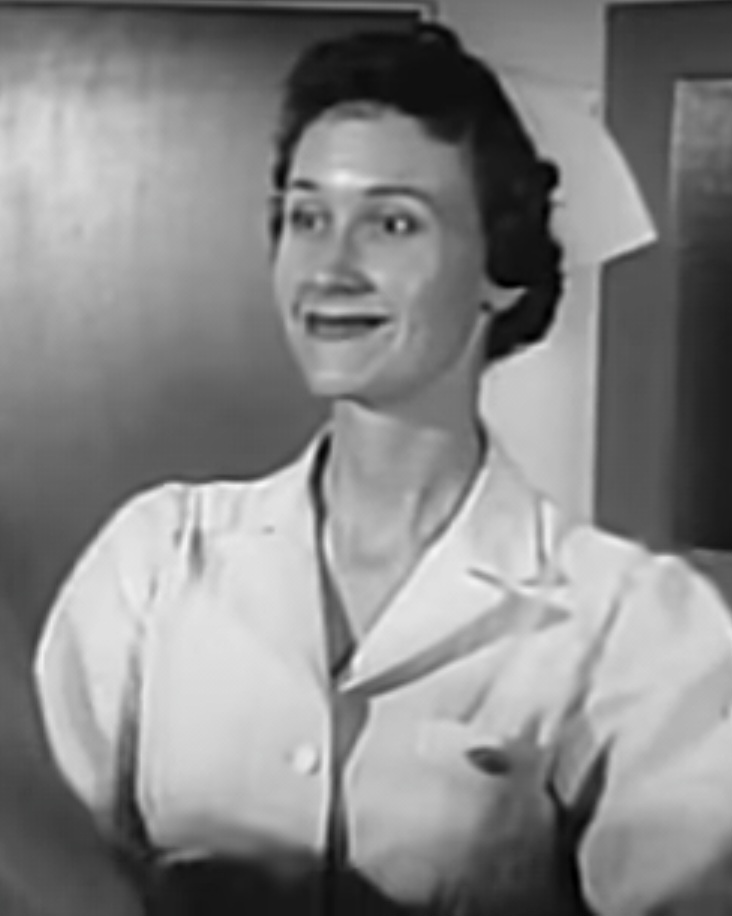
- Backes in an episode of Medic (1955)
- Born: Alice Mayrine Backes; May 17, 1923; Salt Lake City, Utah, U.S.
- Died: March 15, 2007 (aged 83); Virginia Beach, Virginia, U.S.
- Years active: 1946–1997
- Spouse: Milton Citron (m. 1961; died 1983)

Alice Mayrine Backes (May 17, 1923 – March 15, 2007) was an American actress who performed on radio, television, and in films from the 1940s to the 1990s. She worked chiefly on television during her long career. She appeared in over 80 television series and television movies, specializing in character roles and dialects for scripts.

== Early life ==
Alice Mayrine Backes was born in 1923 in Salt Lake City, Utah, the first daughter of Charles Cameron Backes and Lela Mayrine (née Maxwell) Backes, both natives of Montana. According to the United States Census of 1940, 17-year-old Alice was still living that year with her parents in Salt Lake City with her two sisters, Lorraine and Virginia. The 1940 census further documents that her father was at that time a salesman of rock-wool insulation.

Backes attended the University of Utah, where she distinguished herself as a gifted violinist, earning a position as "concert mistress" in the university's symphony orchestra. After the attack on Pearl Harbor, she joined the WAVES, the women's branch of the United States Naval Reserve. She served stateside at WAVES "shore stations" working primarily as a jeep driver in and around Chicago and then San Francisco. She is pictured in the 1945 U. of Utah "Utonian" yearbook as a graduating senior.

== Career ==
Following the war, Backes moved to Hollywood, where by the late 1940s, she began finding steady employment as an actor. In 1948, she performed in an uncredited role as a Swedish immigrant girl in the film Up in Central Park. The bulk of her work, however, in this early stage of her career was as a voice-actor on radio. From 1946 to 1950, she was a cast member on a variety of popular radio programs such as This Is Your FBI, NBC University Theater, Dangerous Assignment, and Family Theater.

Backes continued performing regularly on radio for at least another six years, even after her increasing work on television had become her principal focus. Some of the other radio programs on which she played a variety of characters were The Whistler, The Halls of Ivy, Dragnet, Suspense, and Romance.

=== Television ===
During the 1950s, Backes appeared in over 20 television series, both in dramatic and comedic supporting roles. She secured her first two credited roles on television in 1952: as an office secretary on the series Gang Busters in an episode titled "The Dennis Case" and as Nurse Lenihan in "The Big Jump" on the televised version of Dragnet. Other television series in which Backes performed later in the 1950s include Mr. and Mrs. North, Medic, Dr. Hudson's Secret Journal, The Adventures of Ozzie and Harriet, Studio 57, Startime, Schlitz Playhouse of Stars, The Real McCoys, in 13 episodes of Bachelor Father, Alfred Hitchcock Presents, Lux Video Theatre, M Squad, Hennesey, Law of the Plainsman, Leave It to Beaver, and Gunsmoke. In 1962, Backes appeared as Coralee Darby on the TV Western The Virginian in the episode titled "The Accomplice".

Backes' career continued through the 1970s. In these decades, she either appeared for the first time or returned to perform in more than 60 sitcoms; Westerns; detective, courtroom, and medical shows; anthology series, suspense programs; and television movies. In the 1963 episode of The Andy Griffith Show, "Ernest T. Joins the Army", she played Olive, the widowed waitress working at Mayberry's diner.

While working as a bit playe on some series in the 1960s and 1970s, Backes performed in substantial roles as a supporting character in multiple episodes on other series such as The Rifleman (where her name was misspelled as Alice Backus), Wagon Train, The Detectives, The Alfred Hitchcock Hour, Hazel, Bewitched, Mayberry R.F.D., Here's Lucy, and Adam-12. In 1979, she also portrayed the character Kitty Rawlings in the television movie The Best Place to Be, starring Donna Reed.

By the 1980s, she began to curtail her acting commitments, but she sappeared on Barnaby Jones, Barney Miller, Knight Rider, Mr. Belvedere, and other popular series. Nine years after her 1988 appearance on Mr. Belvedere, she made her last performance on television as Harriet Jenkins in an episode of Columbo, titled "A Trace of Murder".

=== Films ===
She was cast in over a dozen feature films. Her films include the science-fiction comedy The Twonky (1953), I Want to Live! (1958), It Started with a Kiss (1959), That Touch of Mink (1962), The Glory Guys (1965), The Third Day (1965), Snowball Express (1972), The Man from Independence (1974), Half a House (1975), Gable and Lombard (1976), and The Cat from Outer Space (1978).

=== Charities and professional organizations ===
Outside of her acting assignments, Backes contributed her time and money to various charities, advocacy groups for children and wildlife welfare, and professional organizations. She promoted the work and served on boards and committees of the United Nations' International Children's Emergency Fund, Women's Institute for Freedom of the Press, Whidbey Animals' Improvement Foundation, the American Federation of Television and Radio Artists, the Screen Actors Guild, Theatre West, and Pioneer Broadcasters. Backes was also a member of the Academy of Motion Picture Arts and Sciences, and in 2008, the year after her death, SAG formally recognized her contributions to the industry at the guild's televised 14th annual awards ceremony.

== Personal life and death ==
Backes married only once, to Milton Citron, a native of New York, who was a Hollywood sound-effects specialist and editor for both film and television productions. The couple married in 1961 and remained together for over 20 years until Milton's death in April 1983. They had no children. After her retirement from acting in the late 1990s, Backes continued to devote her time to charities and to her lifelong passion for music, studying the works of the classical masters, as well as Broadway scores and early choral compositions.

Backes remained in Los Angeles until 2006, and then she moved to Virginia Beach, Virginia to be closer to family members. The following year, on March 15, Backes died in her sleep of natural causes at the age of 83. In accordance with her wishes and under arrangements made with the Neptune Society, her body was cremated, and her ashes were scattered in the Pacific Ocean.

Backes was a lifelong Mormon.

== Filmography ==
Year	Title	Role	Notes
1948	Up in Central Park	Swedish Immigrant Girl	Uncredited
1952	Gang Busters	Secretary	TV series
1952	Dragnet	Nurse Lenihan	TV series
1953	The Twonky	Offended Phone Operator #1	
1954	Mr. & Mrs. North	Claudia Blair	TV series
1955	Medic	Miss Harris	TV series
1957	The Adventures of Ozzie and Harriet	Woman in Drug Store	TV series
1957	Date with the Angels	Mrs. Fletcher	TV series
1957	The Real McCoys	Miss Small	TV series
1957	Dr. Hudson's Secret Journal		TV series
1957–1958	Bachelor Father	Vickie	TV series, 13 episodes
1958	Studio 57		TV series
1958	M Squad	Switchboard Operator / Maid	TV series, 2 episodes
1958	I Want to Live!	Barbara, San Quentin Nurse	
1959	Alfred Hitchcock Presents	Jennifer Gifford	Season 4 Episode 26: "Cheap Is Cheap"
1958–1959	Lux Playhouse	Mrs. Dolman	TV series, 2 episodes
1959	Schlitz Playhouse of Stars	Martha	TV series
1959	It Started with a Kiss	Sally Meriden	
1959	The Ann Sothern Show	Arlene	TV series
1959	Law of the Plainsman	Abbey Hollis	TV series
1959–1960	Startime	Aunt Pauline / Esther	TV series, 2 episodes
1959–1962	Leave It to Beaver	Miss Lawrence / Nurse	TV series, 2 episodes
1959–1962	General Electric Theater	different roles	TV series, 5 episodes
1959–1966	The Donna Reed Show	Mrs. McCracken / Mrs. Brandon	TV series, 2 episodes
1959–1966	Gunsmoke	Widow Folsome / Cora	TV series, 2 episodes
1960	The Rifleman	Isabel Dent	TV series
1960	Goodyear Theatre	Pauline / Miss Williams	TV series
1960	Riverboat	Mrs. Gaines, the Farmer's Wife	
1960	Hennesey	Miss Dobbs / Ethel Peterson	TV series, 2 episodes
1960	Thriller	Carolyn	TV series
1960	The Tom Ewell Show	Miss Finley	TV series
1960–1962	The Detectives	Different roles	TV series, 4 episodes
1961	Bringing Up Buddy	Secretary	TV series
1961	Dr. Kildare	Miss Ames	TV series
1961	Ben Casey	Mrs. Torrance	TV series
1961–1966	Hazel	Different roles	TV series, 3 episodes
1962	Ichabod and Me	Mrs. Hoskins	TV series, 1 episode
1962	87th Precinct	Jane	TV series, 3 episodes
1962	Outlaws	Mrs. Arbush	TV series
1962	That Touch of Mink	Miriam	TV series, uncredited
1962	Disneyland	Mrs. Cass	TV series
1962	The Virginian	Coralee Darby	TV series
1962–1963	The Jack Benny Show	Bride / Mother	TV series, 2 episodes
1963	The Alfred Hitchcock Hour	Policewoman	Season 1 Episode 23: "The Lonely Hours"
1963	Going My Way	The Grand Dame	TV series
1963	The Dick Powell Show		TV series
1963	The Andy Griffith Show	Olive, the waitress	TV series
1963–1965	Wagon Train	Different roles	TV series, 3 episodes
1964	The Alfred Hitchcock Hour	Mrs. Tridden	Season 2 Episode 17: "The Jar"
1964	The Alfred Hitchcock Hour	Martha Hinchley	Season 2 Episode 29: "Bed of Roses"
1964	The Alfred Hitchcock Hour	Doctor	Season 3 Episode 11: "Consider Her Ways"
1964	My Favorite Martian	Miss Maxwell	TV series
1964	Breaking Point	Mrs. Carson	TV series
1964–1965	Bob Hope Presents the Chrysler Theatre	Maggie / Miss Reddy	TV series, 2 episodes
1964–1966	Bewitched	June Foster / Betty	TV series, 3 episodes
1965	The Alfred Hitchcock Hour	Helen Fiske	Season 3 Episode 27: "The Second Wife"
1965	The Rogues	Watkins	TV series
1965	Burke's Law	Wife	TV series
1965	The Munsters	Miss Fairchild	TV series
1965	The Glory Guys	Mrs. Doris Poole	
1965	The Third Day	Nurse	Uncredited
1965	Barney		TV movie
1966	Katy	Saleswoman	TV series
1968	The Big Valley	Housekeeper	TV series
1968–1973	Here's Lucy	Mrs. Barnes / Woman	TV series, 2 episodes
1969	The Outsider	Telephone Operator	TV series
1969	The Ghost & Mrs. Muir	Mrs. Peterson	TV series
1969	Dragnet 1967	Bertha Johnson	TV series
1970	Doris Day Show	Agnes Albright	TV series
1970	Bill Cosby	Angela	TV series
1970	Lancer	Mrs. Stafford	TV series
1970–1971	Mayberry R.F.D.	Miss Pringle / Miss Fawcett	TV series, 2 episodes
1972	Women in Chains	Mrs. Foster	TV movie
1972	Room 222	Mrs. Webster	TV series
1972	Snowball Express	Miss Ogelvie	
1973	Mannix	Mrs. Oliver	TV series
1973	Owen Marshall, Counselor at Law	Ida	
1973–1974	Adam-12	Estelle Graybill / Woman	TV series, 2 episodes
1974	Ironside	Maggie Moreland	TV series
1974	The Man from Independence	Teacher	TV movie
1974	Maude	Woman	TV series
1974	Kolchak: The Night Stalker	Dr. Shropell / Elena Muñoz	TV series, 2 episodes
1974–1997	Columbo	Harriet Jenkins / Mrs. Moyland	TV series, 2 episodes
1975	Winner Take All		TV movie
1975	Half a House		
1975	Fear on Trial		TV movie
1976	Gable and Lombard		
1976	Baretta	Foley, Nurse	
1977	Whatever Happened to Dobie Gillis?	Mrs. Lazlo	TV movie
1977	Welcome Back, Kotter	Mrs. Hansen	TV series
1977	James at 15	Middle-Aged Woman	TV series
1978	Switch	Librarian	TV series
1978	Kate Bliss and the Ticker Tape Kid	Farmer's Wife	
1978	Project U.F.O.	Nurse	TV series
1979	Turnabout		TV series
1979	The Best Place to Be	Kitty Rawlings	TV movie
1980	Barnaby Jones	Lillian Bennoit	TV series
1981	Barney Miller	Miss Louise Shawcross	TV series
1983	The Greatest American Hero	Eleanor Pilburn	TV series
1983	Amanda's		TV series
1984	Knight Rider	Judge	TV series
1984	The Fisher Family		TV series
1988	Mr. Belvedere	Mrs. Meyers	TV series
