= The Man from Independence =

- Directed by: Jack Smight
- Written by: Edward DeBlasio
- Produced by: Jon Epstein (Producer); David Victor (Executive producer)
- Starring: Robert Vaughn; Arthur Kennedy; Martha Scott; June Dayton
- Release date: March 11, 1974
- Running time: 60 min.
- Country: United States
- Language: English

The Man from Independence is a 1974 biographical–drama film directed by Jack Smight and written by Edward DeBlasio. The film stars Robert Vaughn, Arthur Kennedy, Martha Scott, June Dayton, Russell Johnson, Ronne Troup, Alan Fudge, and Tasha Lee.

== Plot ==
The film tells the story of Harry S. Truman as he begins his political career in 1929.

== Cast ==
- Robert Vaughn as Harry S. Truman
- Arthur Kennedy as Tom Pendergast
- Martha Scott as Mamma Truman
- June Dayton as Bess Truman
- Russell Johnson as Linaver
- Ronne Troup as Constance
- Alan Fudge as Bob Mooney
- Tasha Lee as Margaret Truman
- James Luisi as Stranger
- Lou Frizzell as Quilling
- Leonard Stone as Werner
- Michael Vandever as Lorenzo Dayton
- Alice Backes as Teacher
- Jay Virela as Pete

== Book ==
The Man from Independence was written into a book as Harry S. Truman: The Man from Independence by Karin Clafford Farley in July 1989.

== See also ==
- List of American films of 1974
