= Theodore Roe =

American mob boss

Theodore L. Roe
- Born: August 26, 1898; Galliano, Louisiana, U.S.
- Died: August 4, 1952 (aged 53); Chicago, Illinois, U.S.
- Occupations: Bootlegger; policy king; gangster
- Spouse: Carrie Roe

Theodore L. "Teddy" Roe (August 26, 1898 – August 4, 1952) was a Black American organized crime figure who led an illegal gambling empire in South Side, Chicago during the 1940s and early 1950s. Roe earned the nickname "Robin Hood" because of his philanthropy among the neighborhood poor. After refusing to pay "street tax" or hand over his illegal gambling empire to the Chicago Outfit, Roe fatally shot a made man who had been ordered to assassinate him.

== Early life and career ==
Roe was born in Galliano, Lafourche Parish, Louisiana to a Black American sharecropper, and raised in Little Rock, Arkansas. As a child, he received no formal education, and when he was of age, he did odd jobs for a tailor and learned how to sew. Some time after that, he got involved in bootlegging and gained a notorious reputation as a colorful racketeer who could pass for white. His career as a bootlegger ended after a few years and he moved to Detroit, where he worked in an automobile plant. When he was 31 years old, he took what he learned working for the tailor in Arkansas, and moved from Detroit to Chicago and began working for a Black American tailor named Edward P. Jones. Shortly after Roe began working for Jones, Jones decided to get involved in policy and he made Roe his first "runner", or salesman of lottery chances. Under the protection of politicians Edward Joseph Kelly and Patrick Nash, the Kelly-Nash Machine, Jones was making $2000 a day by 1930. By 1938 he had increased his earnings to $10,000 per day and Roe was pulling down nice cuts from the profits. They soon caught the attention of the Chicago Outfit after Jones shared a cell with caporegime Sam Giancana in federal prison. During their incarceration together, Giancana pumped Jones for information and was amazed by how extremely profitable illegal gambling in poor Black American neighborhoods was for the Jones brothers.

After Giancana's release he received the blessing of acting boss Tony Accardo to extort street tax from every numbers racketeer on the South Side of Chicago. The Jones-Roe wheels were already netting over $25 million annually, by 1946 and Giancana's crew, seeking to move in, kidnapped Ed Jones and held him for a ransom that included $100,000 and a promise to hand over control of his gambling business. Roe paid the $100,000 ransom but after Jones was released, he refused to surrender his own share of the policy business. Meanwhile, the Jones brothers fled to Mexico, leaving the entire business to Roe.

On 7 September 1946 Roe was involved in a high-speed chase and shootout with Paul Labriola, an associate of the Outfit. Neither were hurt.

== The Caifano killing and trial ==
Chicago Outfit capo Sam Giancana, who was attempting to take over the Southside gambling operations, ordered an attempt to kidnap Roe. On June 19, 1951, Roe ended up killing one of the kidnappers, Fat Lenny Caifano, who was not only a made man, but also the brother of capo Marshall Joseph Caifano.

The Chicago Police Department arrested Roe and charged him with murder. The following day, Chicago Police detectives Ed Landis and Richard Barrett transported Roe to a court appearance. According to Detective Barrett's son, DEA agent Rick Barrett, "My Dad said the people of the neighborhood loved Roe. He was like a Robin Hood to them. Dad always said Roe was 'respected' because he refused to give in to the Italians, the Outfit. You know how they say, 'a crook with honor'? I guess that describes Roe. He was not a loudmouthed flambuoyant jerk and definitely not a murdering thug like the drug lords who took over that same neighborhood years later."

To prevent the Outfit from murdering him, Roe was placed under heavy guard at the Cook County Jail. To prevent poisoning, Roe's meals were specially prepared outside prison walls. On June 25, 1951, Roe was further charged with conspiracy to violate the Illinois State anti-gambling statute.

Roe pleaded self-defense and his defense team was also able to link prosecutors to the mob, causing key evidence against Roe to be thrown out. Roe eventually beat the case, but not before being denied bail six times before and during the trial proceedings. Upon beating the case, Roe thumped his chest and exclaimed to reporters, "They'll have to kill me to take me."

== Roe's "Robin Hood" effect ==
In their heyday, policy kings were the black community's banks and employers in Chicago. In the early part of the 20th century, segregation and economic discrimination had a devastating effect on African American communities throughout the United States, and in Chicago and some of the other major cities in the north, the policy industry generated a lot of money to poor black neighborhoods. Policy kings put a lot of their earnings into legitimate businesses such as car dealerships and churches. Aside from running a smooth operation, Roe is remembered for paying hospital bills for newborns, and funeral tabs for the deceased. On one occasion, an elderly woman who had hit the number with one of the shady gangster wheels in town, came to Roe to complain that the gang had not paid her her money for the hit. Roe and some of his boys went over to the men and persuaded them to give her her winnings. He has also been known to walk the streets of poor black neighborhoods passing out fifty dollar bills to needy people.

== Personal life ==
Theodore L. Roe lived in Chicago with wife Carrie until his death. He also had several relatives who lived in Dermott, Arkansas in Chicot County including a brother and a sister.

== Death ==
After Fat Lenny's murder, Sam Giancana masterminded a month-long extortion campaign against the African-American bookmakers of Chicago. Dozens were shot at or blackjacked and others fled the city forever. Meanwhile, Roe stayed in his mansion on South Michigan Avenue.

On August 1, 1947, Roe was told by doctors that he had stomach cancer. On August 4, 1952, he dressed in a three-piece suit and hat and sat out front of his home down South Michigan Avenue. At around 10:00 p.m., as he sat on the stoop outside his home, he was shotgunned. He died outside his former home at 5239 S. Michigan Ave. The trio of Leonard Patrick, David Yaras, and William Block were arrested by Chicago police for the murder.

Roe was laid out in a $3,500–5,000 casket and received the biggest funeral of any Chicago African American since Jack Johnson in 1946. Thousands lined the streets to catch a glimpse of Roe's 81-car funeral procession. At Roe's funeral, Minister Clarence H. Cobb said: "He was a friend of man, and he had a pure heart."

Over an FBI wiretap during the early 1970s, Giancana said of Roe, "I'll say this. Black or no black, that bastard went out like a man. He had balls. It was a fuckin' shame to kill him."

== See also ==
- List of homicides in Illinois § Organized crime
