= Lawrence Mangano =

Lawrence Mangano

Lawrence "Dago Lawrence" Mangano (February 27, 1892 – August 3, 1944) was an American organized crime figure and member of the Chicago Outfit during the 1920s to the 1940s. He was a relative of Joseph Mangano and Philip Mangano, of Chicago, and a suspected relative of New York City Mafia boss Vincent Mangano.

== Early years ==
Mangano was the step-father of Paul Labriola.

A "made man" and a caporegime in Al Capone's Chicago Outfit during Prohibition, Mangano oversaw the extortion of protection money from all criminals in the Near West Side of Chicago, including everyone involved in illegal gambling, fencing, extortion and prostitution. Although Mangano received police protection through bribery, in 1928, a number of Mangano's establishments were raided by police Captain Luke Garrick. Garrick's house was then bombed in retaliation. Although Garrick survived the bombing, no further interference was taken by local law enforcement in the district. Over the course of his life, Mangano claimed he had been arrested over 200 times without ever spending a night in jail, explaining, "They were all bum raps...and besides I had good lawyers."

After the end of Prohibition, in 1933, Mangano kept a very low profile. However, he remained involved in criminal activities throughout the decade.

== Drive by shooting ==
In August 1944, Mangano was driving back from Cicero, Illinois, with his lady friend, Rita Reyes, and his bodyguard, Michael Pontillo. They stopped for a brief drink at the all-night Paddock Lounge. Back in the car, someone in Mangano's group noticed that a black sedan was following them and they pulled over to the side of Blue Island Avenue. As the sedan pulled alongside them, several unidentified gunmen armed with shotguns shot and killed Mangano. The gunmen then turned the sedan around, drove back and killed Pontillo as he was pulling Mangano out of the street.

An autopsy later revealed that Mangano's body contained over 200 shotgun pellets and six .45 caliber bullets. The bullets had been rubbed in garlic, supposedly believed by mobsters to cause infections (not that it was necessary in Mangano's case).

Police officials and the media speculated that Mangano had been killed either in a dispute with the Outfit over a recent cigarette hijacking, or from withholding gambling revenue. Mangano's murder was never solved.

== See also ==
- List of homicides in Illinois § Organized crime

== Bibliography ==
- Bernstein, Lee. The Greatest Menace: Organized Crime in Cold War America. Boston: UMass Press, 2002. ISBN 1-55849-345-X
- Chiocca, Olindo Romeo. Mobsters and Thugs: Quotes from the Underworld. Toronto: Guernica Editions, 2000. ISBN 1-55071-104-0
- Johnson, Curt and R. Craig Sautter. The Wicked City: Chicago from Kenna to Capone. New York: Da Capo Press, 1998. ISBN 0-306-80821-8
- Kobler, John. Capone: The Life and Times of Al Capone. New York: Da Capo Press, 2003. ISBN 0-306-81285-1
- United States. Congress. Senate. Special Committee to Investigate Organized Crime in Interstate Commerce. Investigation of Organized Crime in Interstate Commerce: Hearings Before a Special Committee to Investigate Organized Crime in Interstate Commerce. 1951.
- By United States. Congress. Senate. Government Operations Committee. Organized Crime and Illicit Traffic in Narcotics: Hearings before the Government Operations Committee. 1964.
- Kelly, Robert J. Encyclopedia of Organized Crime in the United States. Westport, Connecticut: Greenwood Press, 2000. ISBN 0-313-30653-2
- Sifakis, Carl. The Mafia Encyclopedia. New York: Da Capo Press, 2005. ISBN 0-8160-5694-3
- Sifakis, Carl. The Encyclopedia of American Crime. New York: Facts on File Inc., 2001. ISBN 0-8160-4040-0
