= It Started with a Kiss (film) =

1959 film by George Marshall

- Promotional movie poster for the film
- Directed by: George Marshall
- Written by: Valentine Davies (story); Charles Lederer
- Produced by: Aaron Rosenberg
- Starring: Glenn Ford; Debbie Reynolds; Eva Gabor; Edgar Buchanan; Harry Morgan
- Cinematography: Robert J. Bronner
- Edited by: John McSweeney Jr.
- Music by: Jeff Alexander
- Distributed by: Metro-Goldwyn-Mayer
- Release date: August 19, 1959
- Running time: 104 minutes
- Country: United States
- Language: English
- Budget: $1,789,000
- Box office: $4,650,000

It Started with a Kiss is a 1959 American romantic comedy film directed by George Marshall and starring Glenn Ford, Debbie Reynolds and Eva Gabor. It was shot in Metrocolor and CinemaScope.

== Plot ==
Joe Fitzpatrick, a sergeant in the Air Force marries a feisty nightclub showgirl named Maggie on a whim. The day after their marriage Joe is sent to a base in Spain. Later that day Maggie is surprised to find that a unique custom car was delivered to her (a shiny red 1955 Lincoln Futura Concept automobile with bucket seats and a clear bubble top); he won it in a raffle. After this she sends him a letter saying that she has a wonderful surprise that she is bringing to him. He ponders what that means, and suspects that she means that she is pregnant. When she arrives in Spain, there is a party where this is sprung on her, and she denies pregnancy, but doesn't explain the surprise.

When the car does arrive Joe is surprised but pleased. However, when Joe first arrived in Spain there was a stiff lecture about not appearing ostentatious to the locals. As they travel around Spain they are met with both envy and disdain from Spanish officials and locals, and the car does indeed stand out. When the top brass see the vehicle, they ask that he send it home at their expense, however, he is afraid that this will upset his newlywed wife, as they are already on shaky ground since she resents the Air Force interfering in their lives.

One of the big car fans is a famous Spanish bullfighter. After the IRS demands that they pay $17,000 in taxes for the vehicle, which they cannot pay, they decide to sell the vehicle to the bullfighter. However, the Air Force learns of this transaction, and it violates one of their regulations about selling personal property to locals. So, the Sergeant is arrested and confined to quarters.

He and his wife have separated at this point, but at a big party (held in a mansion he is living in temporarily) she learns that he is living with a glamorous countess who is a friend of the bullfighter. She, however, is jealous, and manages to get the bullfighter to propose to her in order to make her husband jealous. However, she really doesn't want the bullfighter, so she sneaks into the room she thinks her husband is sleeping in, however she ends up surprising the general in his bed. They make enough noise to attract a crowd who burst in, and in the process she ends up hiding in the bed while her husband is in the room. Of course she is discovered, and in the ensuing confusion of mixed understandings they reconcile and a solution to the car problem is revealed. In the end, they happily retire to their bedroom to enjoy togetherness.

== Cast ==
- Glenn Ford as Sgt. Joe Fitzpatrick
- Debbie Reynolds as Maggie Putnam
- Eva Gabor as Marquesa Marion de la Rey
- Gustavo Rojo as Antonio Soriano
- Fred Clark as Maj. Gen. Tim O'Connell
- Edgar Buchanan as Congressman Richard Tappe
- Henry Morgan (aka Harry Morgan) as Charles Meriden
- Robert Warwick as Congressman Muir
- Frances Bavier as Mrs. Tappe
- Netta Packer as Mrs. Muir
- Robert Cunningham as The Major
- Alice Backes as Sally Meriden
- Carmen Phillips as Belvah
- Robert Hutton as Alvin Ashley (uncredited)
- Richard Deacon as Capt. Porter (uncredited)

== Production ==
A scene in the movie recreated a well-known sequence from the 1938 film Bringing Up Baby, when Joe must walk in step behind Maggie to hide her torn dress.

The car used in the film, the Lincoln Futura, was later customized by George Barris to serve as the Batmobile for the 1960s TV series Batman.

== Reception ==
=== Box office ===
According to MGM records the film earned $2,750,000 in the US and Canada and $1.9 million elsewhere, resulting in a profit of $582,000.

== See also ==
- List of American films of 1959
