= June Dayton =

American actress (1923–1994)

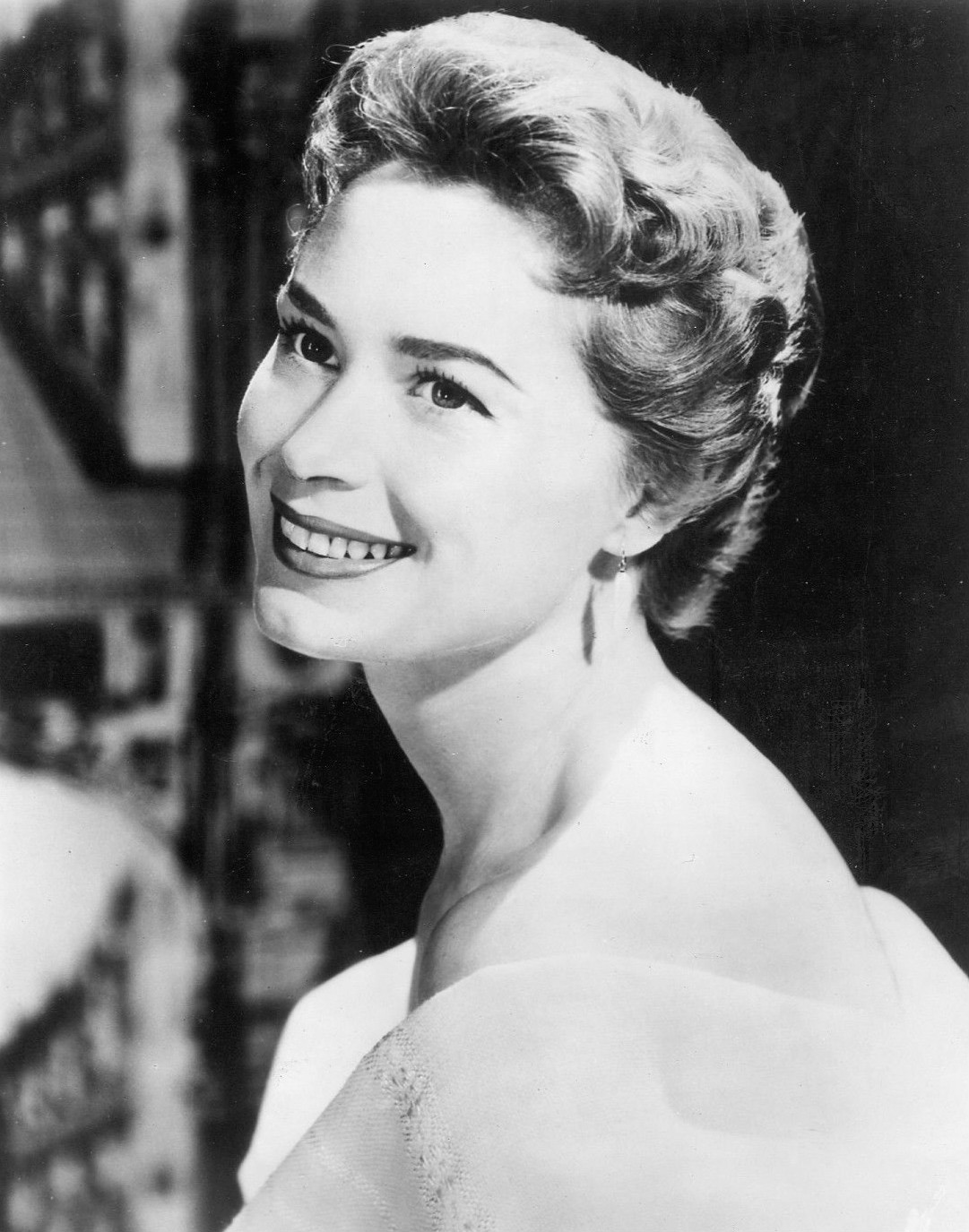
- Dayton in 1961
- Born: Mary June Wetzel; August 24, 1923; Dayton, Ohio, U.S.
- Died: June 13, 1994 (aged 70); Sherman Oaks, California, U.S.
- Occupation: Actress
- Years active: 1951–1986
- Spouse(s): Dean Harens (m. 1947)

June Dayton (born Mary June Wetzel; August 24, 1923 – June 13, 1994) was an American television actress who appeared in a variety of shows from the 1950s into the 1980s.

== Early life ==
Dayton was born in Dayton, Ohio. She used her hometown of Dayton to create a professional name. Her introduction to acting came via a dramatic arts course in college.

== Stage ==
Dayton's Broadway credits include The Ivy Green (1949), Tenting Tonight (1947) and Lovely Me (1946).

She worked in summer stock theater for several years, and in 1951, she toured in Australia with a production of The Moon Is Blue.

== Television ==
Dayton played Mary Aldrich in The Aldrich Family, Patsy Hamilton in The Brighter Day, Jennifer in A Date with Life, Grace Baden in Lucas Tanner, and Lucy Spaulding in Paradise Bay.

Dayton appeared as a guest star in episodes of Studio One, Robert Montgomery Presents, Kraft Theatre, The Untouchables (1959 TV series), Gunsmoke (“Laughing Gas” - 1958 - S3E29 & “Bently” - 1964 - S9E28), The Investigators, The Fugitive, The F.B.I., Barnaby Jones, and Quincy, M.E.. She made five guest appearances on Perry Mason: in 1957 she played defendant Myrna Davenport in "The Case of the Runaway Corpse", in 1958 as defendant Sue Hardisty in "The Case of the Buried Clock", and in 1960 as wife Alice Gorman in "The Case of the Ill-Fated Faker". Dayton played Catherine Driscoll in the episode "The Party Line" on CBS's Dennis the Menace. She had a memorable role as Helen Turner in The Twilight Zone episode "A Penny for Your Thoughts", which featured Dick York. She appeared in an episode of Armstrong Circle Theatre titled "Divorcees Anonymous".

In 1965, Dayton was cast as Virginia Farragut in "The Battle of San Francisco Bay" in the syndicated anthology series, Death Valley Days. She also starred in a 1969 episode of Land of the Giants titled "Home Sweet Home".

Dayton guest-starred in two episodes of Cannon: the September 1971 episode of "Death Chain" as Susan Kendrix and the February 1974 episode "Blood Money" as Nurse Laura Meader.

She made three appearances on Barnaby Jones: the January 1974 episode "The Platinum Connection" as Mrs. Andrews, the October 1974 episode "Odd Man Loses" as Pam Hogan and the March 1979 episode "Child of Love Child of Vengeance: Part 1" as Marie Adams."

Her film appearances included roles in Twilight of Honor (1963), One Man's Way (1963), Tora! Tora! Tora! (1970), Something for Joey (1977), Deadman's Curve (1978) and The Other Side of the Mountain Part 2 (1978). Dayton was in an episode of The Dick Van Dyke Show about an ex army buddy who Rob thought is a jewel thief.

== Personal life ==
Dayton married actor Dean Harens in 1947. The marriage lasted until her death in 1994.

== Death ==
Dayton died of cancer in Sherman Oaks, California. She was 70.

== Selected filmography ==
Year	Title	Role	Notes
1961	The Twilight Zone	Helen Turner	Season 2 Episode 16: "A Penny for Your Thoughts"
1963	The Alfred Hitchcock Hour	Barbara Stander	Season 1 Episode 19: "To Catch a Butterfly"
1963	Twilight of Honor	Vera Driscoll	
1964	One Man's Way	Mrs. Gordon	
1970	Tora! Tora! Tora!	Miss Ray Cave	
1974	The Man from Independence	Bess Truman	
1977	Something for Joey	Mrs. Frome	
1978	Deadman's Curve	Clara Berry	
1978	The Other Side of the Mountain Part 2	Mrs. Boothe	
1979	Captain America	Secretary	
