= Ray Ryan (businessman) =

American businessman (1904–1977)

Raymond John Ryan (January 9, 1904 in Watertown, Wisconsin – October 18, 1977) was an American professional gambler, oilman, promoter, and developer. Described as having a larger-than-life personality, he mingled with prominent businesspeople and movie stars, as well as with cardsharps and mobsters on his path to fame and fortune. His sensational murder case was never solved.

== Biography ==
In the 1920s he went into the oil business, but was unsuccessful. In the process, he did, however, learn some powerful lessons about making timely investment decisions. He finally succeeded in the oil drilling in the 1940s due to the booming oilfields of southern Indiana, Illinois, and western Kentucky. His oil business was managed by Kentucky native, William "Billy" Gorman, who died in a mysterious horse riding accident in 1974.

In 1949, Ryan gave an inscribed gold key chain to Las Vegas mobster Davie Berman that read, "DB from Ray Ryan, 1949." Yet in the 1960s Ryan was reported to have testified against the mob in an FBI case, a factor that could have been linked to his eventual murder in 1977. Another theory is that he was alleged to have cheated mob-connected gambler Nick the Greek in poker for over $500,000 in 1949, and old resentments over this had flared up.

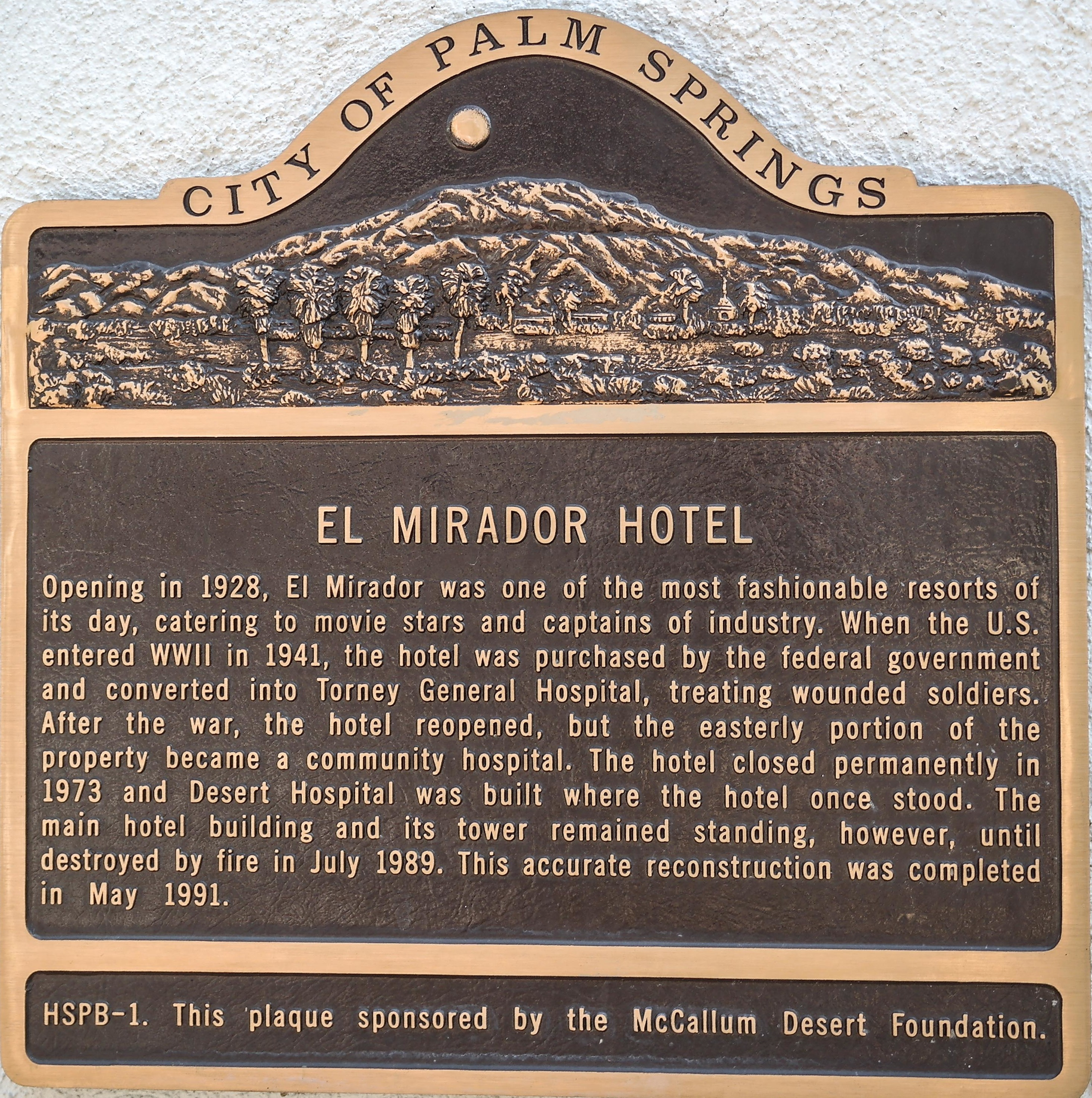
El Mirador Hotel plaque

In the 1950s and '60s, Ryan was a land developer in Palm Springs, California. Real estate development in Palm Springs did not generate much interest until actor Clark Gable built a home there. Ryan joined with 24 other investors to purchase the run-down El Mirador Hotel in Palm Springs. After restoring it to its former elegance, he bought out his partners in 1960. The list of regular guests included William Holden, Dean Martin, Gregory Peck, Paulette Goddard, Ginger Rogers, Louella Parsons, and Freeman Gosden, among others. Howard Hughes secured a separate cottage to ensure privacy.

In 1962 Ryan, with partner Ernie Dunlevie, opened the Bermuda Dunes Country Club which later became a host club for the Bob Hope Classic golf tournament and where Clark Gable built a home on the sixth fairway.

Ryan was the target of a public IRS audit in the 1970s over some disallowed deductions stemming from his involvement in and development of the Mount Kenya Safari Club, in Nanyuki, Kenya, with actor William Holden.

== Murder in Evansville, Indiana ==
In 1964, Marshall Caifano was convicted of extorting $60,000 from Ryan, who testified against him. The conviction was upheld in 1966, and Caifano was sentenced to 10 years in prison. When Caifano was released from prison in the 1970s, Ryan reportedly offered him $1 million in restitution; however, on October 18, 1977, Ryan was killed. Ryan went to a health club, as he often did. When he finished his workout, he walked outside to his new Lincoln Mark V coupe. However, someone had connected a bomb to the ignition of the car. As soon as Ryan turned the key, Ryan's car exploded violently. The impact of explosion killed Ryan almost instantly. It took investigators two days to locate and collect all of the pieces of the car – one piece of metal was located 377 feet from the scene of the explosion. The murder is unsolved.

== See also ==
- Marvin Davis
