= Lou Frizzell =

American actor and music director

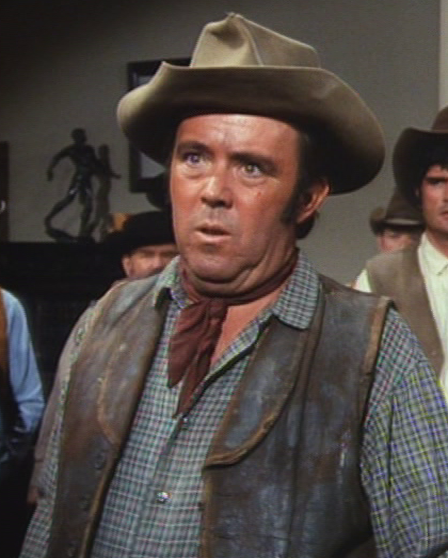
- Lou Frizzell c. 1970 on Bonanza
- Born: Louis Francis Frizzell Jr. June 10, 1920; Missouri, U.S.
- Died: June 17, 1979 (aged 59); Los Angeles, California, U.S.
- Occupations: Actor, music director
- Years active: 1955–1979

Lou Frizzell (June 10, 1920 – June 17, 1979) was an American actor and music director who worked on Broadway productions, television shows and films. He was perhaps best known for playing Dusty Rhodes in the American western television series Bonanza. Frizzell died in June 1979 of lung cancer at his home in Los Angeles, California, at the age of 59.

== Filmography ==
Year	Title	Role	Notes
1968	The Stalking Moon	Stationmaster	
1969	Tell Them Willie Boy Is Here	Whitewater station agent	
1969	The Reivers	Doyle	
1970	Halls of Anger	Phil Stuart	
1971	Duel	School Bus Driver	Extended theatrical version
1971	Summer of '42	Druggist	
1972	The Other	Uncle George	
1972	Hickey & Boggs	Lawyer	
1972	Rage	J.T. 'Spike' Boynton (veterinarian)	
1974	The Man from Independence	Quilling	
1974	Our Time	Dr. Freeman	
1974	The Crazy World of Julius Vrooder	Fowler	
1974	The Front Page	Endicott	
1974	The New Land	Murdock	TV series (series regular)
1976	Farewell to Manzanar (TV Movie)	Himself	He was the actual music teacher at Manzanar
1977	Capricorn One	Horace Gruning	
1978	Ruby and Oswald	Captain J. Will Fritz	
