= J. W. Fritz =

Captain at the Dallas Police Department

- Born: John William Fritz; June 15, 1896; Dublin, Texas, U.S.
- Died: April 19, 1984 (aged 87); Dallas, Texas, U.S.
- Occupations: Captain of Homicide and Robbery Bureau, Dallas Police Department
- Spouse: Faye
- Children: one daughter

John William Fritz (June 15, 1896 – April 19, 1984) was the captain of Homicide and Robbery Bureau of the Dallas Police Department. In November 1963, he received nationwide attention as the head of the police investigation into the assassination of John F. Kennedy and the primary interrogator of Lee Harvey Oswald. His membership of the Ku Klux Klan led to wrongful convictions being overturned.

== Early life ==
Fritz was born on June 15, 1896, in Dublin, Texas. He spent much of his childhood on a ranch near Lake Arthur, New Mexico. As a young man, he earned a living as a horse and mule merchant, traveling around West Texas and New Mexico. He served briefly in the army during World War I. In the early 1920s, he enrolled in Tarleton State College (now Tarleton State University) in Stephenville, Texas.

== Police career ==
Fritz joined the Dallas Police Department in 1921 and soon became a detective. In the early 1930s, he was involved in the hunt for Bonnie and Clyde. He was promoted to captain in 1934 to organize the Homicide and Robbery Bureau. Although he was made an inspector of detectives in 1935, he voluntarily returned to the rank of captain in 1944. In 1947, he was given the title of senior captain, as he reportedly refused the offer to become the Dallas police chief. As the captain of the Homicide and Robbery Bureau, Fritz gained a reputation as a skilled interrogator.

The Homicide and Robbery Bureau was considered the elite unit of the Dallas Police Department, and its detectives wore unique Stetson hats. Because of his experience and intimidating demeanor, most Dallas police officers respected and feared Fritz more than Dallas police chief Jesse Curry. According to author Vincent Bugliosi, Fritz was known to run his bureau as his "own private and independent fiefdom". Dallas district attorney Henry Wade told the Warren Commission that Fritz "runs a kind of one-man operation", and was reluctant to tell others what he was doing.

== Kennedy assassination ==
Fritz (far left) was present when Oswald was shot by Ruby

On November 22, 1963, around 1 PM (about 30 minutes after the assassination), Fritz led the search of the Texas School Book Depository building. A bolt action rifle and three empty rifle cartridges were discovered by his team on the building's sixth floor.

After Oswald's apprehension as a suspect in the killing of officer J. D. Tippit, Fritz connected him to the Kennedy assassination, because Oswald was the only employee missing from the building.

Fritz questioned Oswald all afternoon about the shootings of Kennedy and Tippit. The Dallas police intermittently questioned him for approximately 12 hours between 2:30 p.m., on November 22, and 11 a.m., on November 24. Throughout, Oswald denied any involvement with either shooting. Fritz kept only rudimentary notes. Days later, he wrote a report of the interrogation from notes he made afterwards. There were no stenographic or tape recordings. Representatives of other law enforcement agencies were also present, including the FBI and the Secret Service, and occasionally participated in the questioning. Several of the FBI agents who were present wrote contemporaneous reports of the interrogation.

On the evening of November 22, Texas School Book Depository superintendent Roy Truly was overheard by reporter Kent Biffle, informing Fritz that he had seen Oswald in “a storage room on the first floor”. Fritz wrote that Truly saw Oswald “immediately after the shooting somewhere near the back stairway”. The storage room on the first floor was located near the back stairway. Fritz wrote in his notes that Oswald claimed he was “out with [William Shelley, a foreman at the depository] in front”.

Fritz did not get a confession from Oswald, but said he had all the proof he needed to convict. On November 22, before midnight, Fritz formally charged Oswald with murder.

Operating under chief Curry, Fritz helped plan the transfer of Oswald from the police headquarters to the Dallas county jail. He was present when Oswald was shot by Jack Ruby on November 24.

Fritz provided testimony to Warren Commission assistant counsel Joseph A. Ball. He provided additional testimony on July 14, 1964 to assistant counsel Leon D. Hubert Jr.

== Later life and death ==
Fritz rarely gave interviews or spoke about the assassination in public. In 1969, he was transferred to the position of night commander of the criminal investigation division, a move that can be interpreted as a demotion. Fritz retired on February 27, 1970 after 49 years of service, and spent his retirement hunting, fishing and keeping cattle. He was divorced from his wife, and lived alone much of his life in the White Plaza Hotel, located near the Dallas police headquarters.

Fritz died on April 19, 1984.

According to Jim Gatewood, when the Dallas Chapter of the Ku Klux Klan, in 1921, boasted 13,000 members, the largest Klan cell in the United States, Fritz was advised by newly appointed Chief of Police Elmo Strait that his name was on a list of preferred guests invited to a steak dinner at the Sons of Herman Hall. Fritz became friends with Dallas County Deputy Sheriff Bill Decker. The speaker, Hiram Wesley, was introduced as the Imperial Wizard of the National Klan. Both Decker and Fritz were listed as potential Klan candidates and both paid the $6.00 membership fee and joined the Ku Klux Klan. Book Depository employee Buell Wesley Fraizer claimed that he was treated harshly with intimidation, stating that he was confronted with a pre-made confession presented by Fritz and described Fritz as angry when he refused. Fritz was accused of racist treatment towards people he termed "gyspies" or "Japs". Tommy Lee Walker was reportedly intimidated by Fritz and threatened with a beatup. In 2019, convictions of two men under Fritz were overturned. In 2026, the Dallas County Commissioners Court symbolically exonerated Walker, albeit the decision is not legally binding.

== Popular culture ==
In the 1970s Fritz was portrayed by William Phipps in the 1977 film The Trial of Lee Harvey Oswald and by Lou Frizzell in the 1978 made-for-television movie, Ruby and Oswald. In the 1991 Oliver Stone film JFK, Fritz was portrayed by William Larsen. In the 21st century he has been portrayed by Mike Shiflett in the 2013 TV movie Killing Kennedy and by Wilbur Fitzgerald in the 2016 miniseries 11.22.63.

== Sources ==
- Warren, Earl (1964). Report of the President's Commission on the Assassination of President Kennedy. United States Government Printing Office.
