= Jesse Curry =

American police officer and Dallas Police Chief (1913–1980)

Chief of Police Jesse Curry
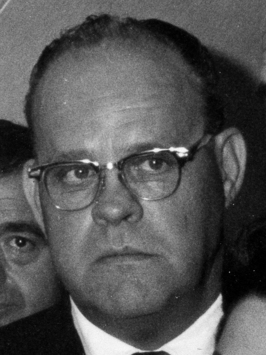
- Born: October 3, 1913; Hamilton, Texas, U.S.
- Died: June 22, 1980 (aged 66); Dallas, Texas, U.S.
- Resting place: Grove Hill Cemetery
- Police career
- Country: United States
- Department: Dallas Police Department
- Service years: May 1, 1936 – May 1, 1966

17th Chief of the Dallas Police Department
- In office January 20, 1960 – March 10, 1966
- Preceded by: Carl Hansson
- Succeeded by: Charles Batchelor

Jesse Edward Curry (October 3, 1913 – June 22, 1980) was an American police officer who was the chief of the Dallas Police Department from 1960 to 1966, which included the period of the assassination of President John F. Kennedy in downtown Dallas on November 22, 1963.

== Early life ==
Born in Hamilton, Texas, Curry and his family moved to Dallas when he was a few months old. Curry's father served as a police officer in Dallas for a brief period of time before becoming a Baptist minister. Curry attended Dallas Technical High School. He was an all-district tackle and led his high school football team to the state finals against Greenville High School in 1933. He studied optometry for a short time after graduation. During World War II, Curry served for eleven months in the Civilian Pilot Training Program.

== Law enforcement career ==
Curry joined the Dallas Police Department as a traffic officer on May 1, 1936, and worked his way up the ranks to become the chief of police on January 20, 1960. As Curry explained it to the Warren Commission, he worked his way up in "practically every assignment the police department has", and graduated from the Northwestern University Traffic Institute in 1945/6 and the FBI National Academy in 1951.

=== Kennedy assassination ===
Dallas Chief of Police Jesse Curry was riding in the lead car of the Presidential motorcade with Dallas County sheriff Bill Decker when they turned west off Houston Street onto Elm Street. Looking straight ahead, they noticed "a few unauthorized people on the overpass and wondered how they got there." Those people were later described as thirteen railroad men and two policemen who were stationed on the overpass (Triple Underpass) against rules of protocol. After the Presidential motorcade had proceeded a few more yards, Curry heard the first gunshot and immediately shouted over the police radio: "Get a man on top of that triple underpass and see what happened up there!" His words sounded an alarm that something was dreadfully wrong.

On April 15, 1964, Warren Commission assistant counsel Leon D. Hubert obtained a deposition from Curry at the US Post Office Building in Dallas. The following week on April 22, Curry, along with other officers of the Dallas Police Department, provided testimony to the Commission in Washington, D.C.

Curry later recounted in his Warren Commission testimony and with the LBJ Presidential Library that as he rode in the lead car of the motorcade carrying President Kennedy, he provided security for both the president and the vice-president, Lyndon B. Johnson, at Parkland Memorial Hospital where President Kennedy died, and, later, aboard Air Force One when Johnson was sworn in as the new president.

Two hours after President Kennedy was assassinated, Dallas Police arrested Lee Harvey Oswald in connection with the murder of Dallas Police officer J.D. Tippit and charged him with both crimes. Curry and the Dallas Police were initially praised for the capture of Oswald, but the praise ended two days later when Oswald was fatally shot by nightclub owner Jack Ruby in the basement of the Dallas Police station while he was being transferred to the county jail. Curry had allowed journalists and camera men into the area to witness the transfer in an effort to quell rumors that Oswald was being mistreated while in police custody. Curry was later criticized and sometimes blamed for compromising Oswald's safety and allowing him to be shot "in the basement of [Curry's] own building."

After the Kennedy assassination, Curry and his family received death and kidnapping threats.

== Personal life ==
Curry was a member of the St. John's United Methodist Church in Dallas, where he was also a choir member. Two weeks before his death, he was honored as being the oldest member of the congregation. Curry was also a Freemason.

=== Marriages and children ===
Curry was married twice. He and his first wife had a son, Gene (born 1937). They later divorced. Curry then married Bessie "Bea" Wilhelm with whom he had a daughter, Cathey. They remained married until Curry's death in 1980.

== Later life and death ==
Due to health issues and on the advice of his doctor, Curry retired from the Dallas Police Department in 1966. In 1969, he wrote a book on the subject of JFK's assassination entitled, Retired Dallas Police Chief, Jesse Curry Reveals His Personal JFK Assassination File. On November 5, 1969, Curry held a press conference to announce the release of his book said to contain his "personal file" of the assassination. During the interview, Curry expressed his doubts about the Warren Commission's single bullet theory and their finding of a lone assassin. Curry stated: "I'm not sure about it. No one has ever been able to put (Oswald) in the Texas School Book Depository with a rifle in his hand." Curry reasoned in another interview: "I think there's a possibility that one [shot] could have come from in front [of the limousine]. We've never, we've never been able to prove that, but just in my mind and by the direction of his blood and brain from the president from one of the shots, it would just seem that it would have to [have] been fired from the front rather than behind. I can't say that I could swear that I believe that it was one man and one man alone. I think there's a possibility there could have been another man." Curry also gave serious attention to the possibility that Oswald was visible in the main doorway of the Texas School Book Depository in a photo taken during the assassination, despite the man being identified as depository employee Billy Lovelady, (Note: see § The man resembling Lee Harvey Oswald.) a quote later noted by researcher Sean Murphy who suggested that the unidentified "prayer man", another individual behind Lovelady, filmed on the Depository steps by Dave Wiegman, Jr., of NBC, and James Darnell, of WBAP-TV, was Oswald. In 1970 and 1977 articles, Curry continued to express some doubts about the official version of events.

After his retirement, he worked as director of security at the Texas Bank Building until 1976 when he was forced to step down after suffering two heart attacks. For the remainder of his life, Curry worked as a private investigator.

Curry suffered from diabetes and survived a stroke in 1978. On June 22, 1980, Curry suffered a fatal heart attack in his sleep at his Dallas home. He was taken to Baylor University Medical Center at Dallas where he was pronounced dead, at the age of 66. His funeral was held at the Ed C. Smith Funeral Chapel on June 25, after which he was buried at Grove Hill Cemetery in Dallas.

== In media ==
- Curry was played by Henry Gibson in the 2003 film The Commission.

== Authored works ==
- Retired Dallas Police Chief, Jesse Curry Reveals His Personal JFK Assassination File. American Poster and Printing Company. 1969.
