= Paul Roland Jones =

American criminal associated with the Chicago Outfit

- Born: August 23, 1909; Pittsburg, Kansas
- Allegiance: Chicago Outfit
- Convictions: Murder (1931); Bribery (1947); Drug smuggling (1947)

Paul Roland Jones was a 20th-century American criminal associated with the Chicago Outfit.

== Biography ==
Jones was born 23 August 1909 in Pittsburg, Kansas. He was convicted of a 1931 murder in the state, for which he received a life sentence. However in July 1940 he was pardoned by Governor Walter A. Huxman. He subsequently became involved in the egg dehydration business. He also invested in uranium mines, a shrimp brokerage, and a quack cancer clinic.

Jones first came to Dallas at the beginning of the 1940s. In 1942 he was convicted of selling gasoline and sugar rationing coupons, receiving a $750 fine. He worked with Nick DeJohn of the Outfit in this endeavour. During the same period he was involved with narcotics trafficking across the Mexican border to St. Louis, Denver, Kansas, and Chicago. As a representative of the Chicago Outfit in Mexico City, he opened a casino there. His activities were put to an end by the US government, although he was hopeful that if Miguel Alemán Valdés was elected president of Mexico he could recontinue his activities.

One of Jones' associates was Marcus Lipsky, himself an associate of the Chicago Outfit. In Texas and Louisiana they purchased a number of "music companies" which served as a front for the selling of slot machines. In 1946 Jones was charged in a theft scheme involving electric motors for weight-reducing machines. He posted $2000 in bail and left Dallas but returned about two months later. Lipsky, Jones and others were part of a group of Chicago Outfit representatives who attempted to make a move on behalf of the Outfit into the Dallas gambling scene, then dominated by Benny Binion. Lipsky came up with a plan to kill Binion and others, he would leave their bodies outside of the Dallas police station in a stolen car as a symbolic act. However Jones managed to convince him that this would bring unwanted attention.

In November 1946 Jones attempted to bribe the soon to be sheriff Steve Guthrie. He met him at Guthrie's house with Lieutenant George Butler. Jones proposed to Guthrie that if he let Chicago-owned casinos and gambling go on unhindered he would receive $40,000 a month. A series of meetings followed which totalled ten hours. Unknown to Jones, he was caught in a sting operation and was being recorded. Jones' lawyer argued that because Guthrie had yet to be sworn in, he had technically not attempted to bribe a police officer. The defence was rejected and Jones was sentenced to three years in prison. Simultaneous to this he was tried and convicted of opium smuggling from Mexico to Texas and received a nine-year sentence. The case received significant local attention and was dramatized on the local Mutual Radio Network, broadcast on Christmas eve.

While in Dallas Jones was introduced to Jack Ruby and spent time at his club. He also knew Ruby's brother Hyman and his sister Eva. Hyman was an informant for the Federal Bureau of Narcotics and testified against Jones in his drug smuggling case. Just two days before the assassination of John F. Kennedy, Jones had visited Ruby at his nightclub, The Carousel Club.
