= List of people from Missouri =

State flag of Missouri

Location of Missouri in the United States

The following are people who were either born, raised, or have lived for a significant period of time in the U.S. state of Missouri.

== Art and literature ==
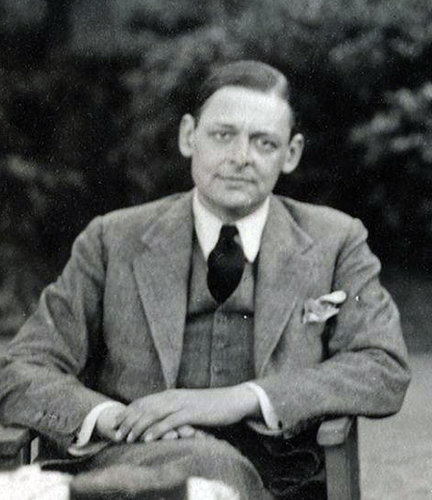
T. S. Eliot

Russ Mitchell

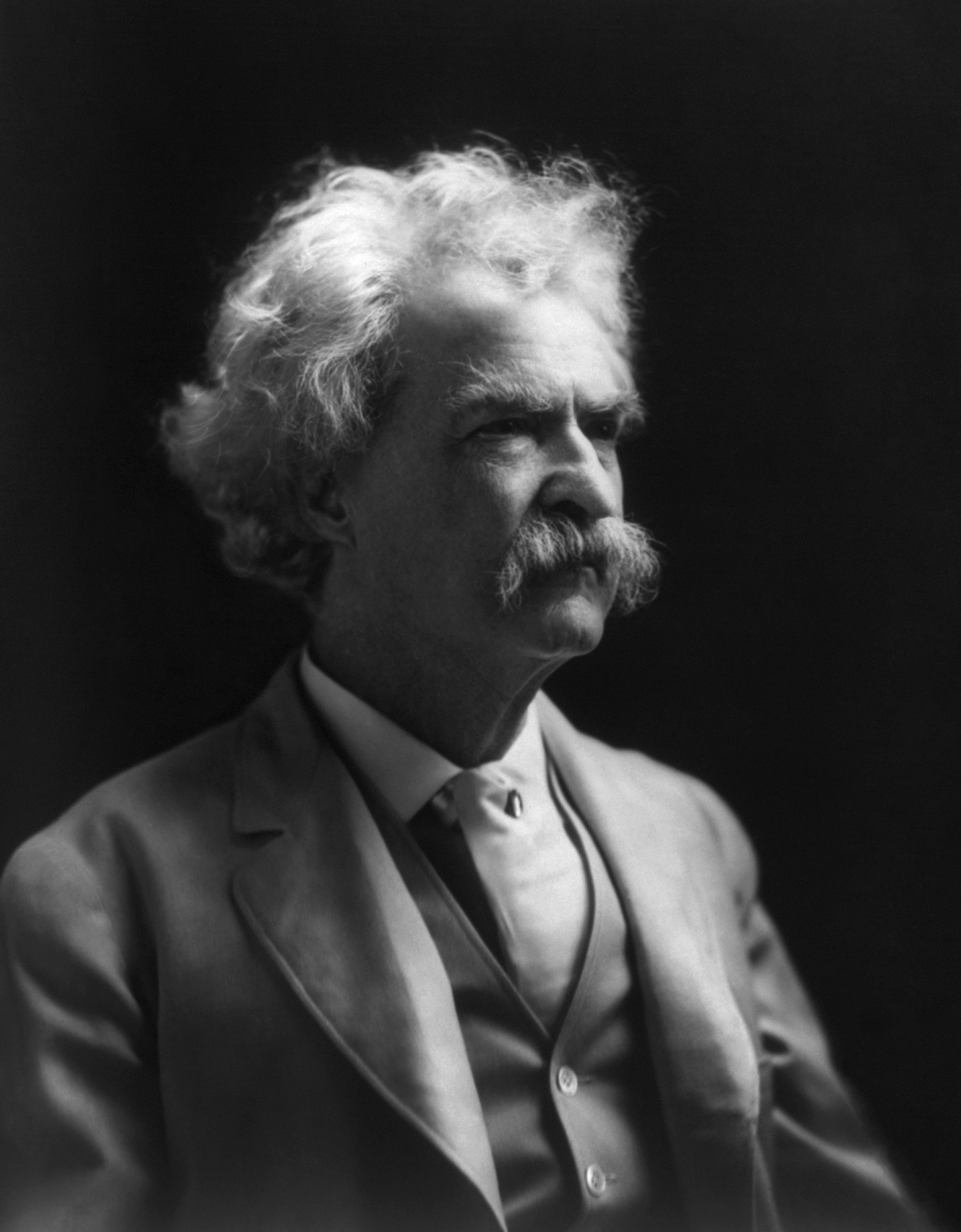
Mark Twain

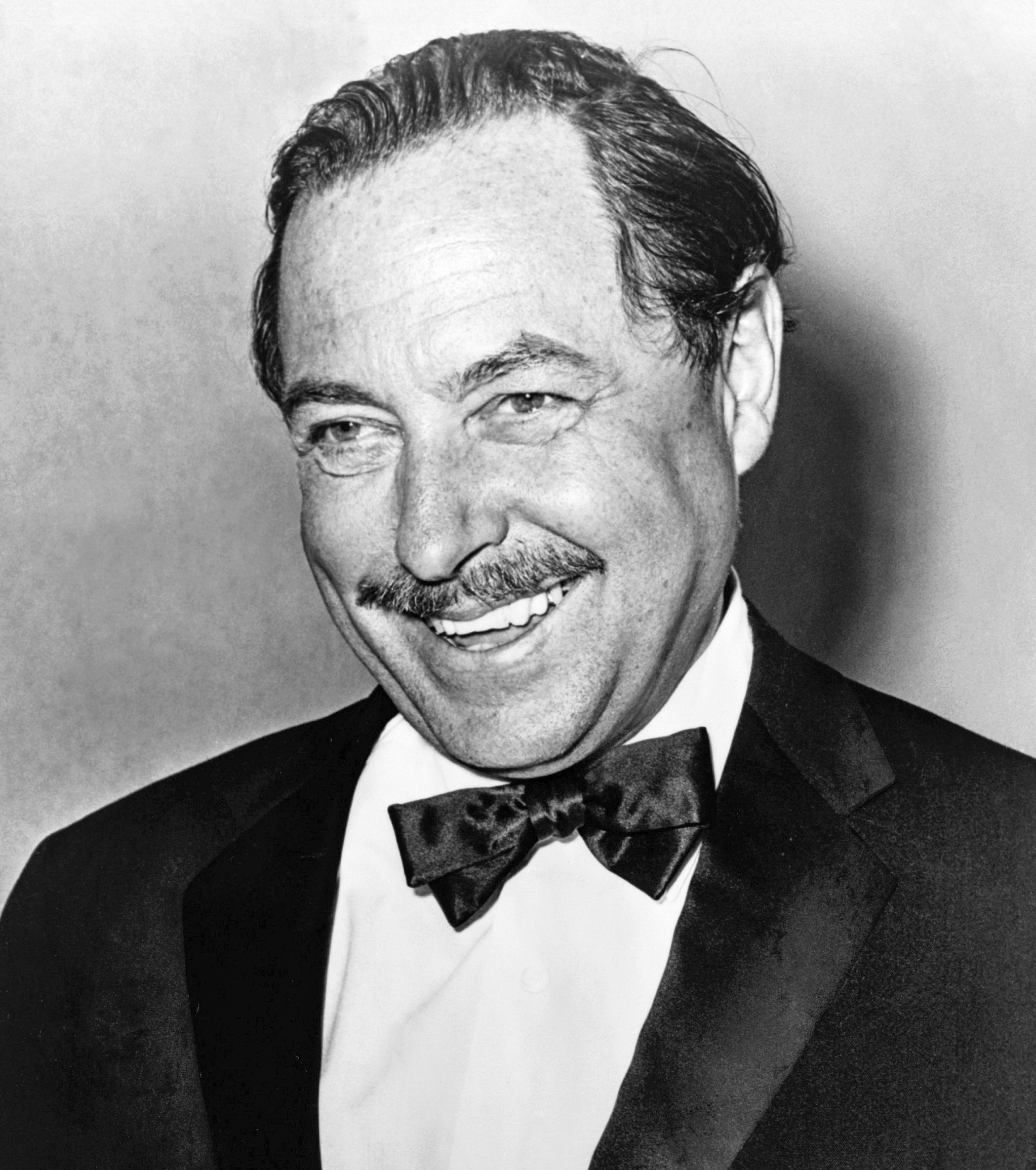
Tennessee Williams

- Helen Andelin (1920–2009), author of Fascinating Womanhood
- Maya Angelou (1928–2014), author and poet
- Thomas P. Barnett (1870–1929), architect and impressionist painter
- Thomas Hart Benton (1889–1975), painter
- George Caleb Bingham (1811–1879), artist (born in Virginia but moved to central Missouri)
- Edward McKendree Bounds (1835–1913), author and theologian
- Mark Bowden (born 1951), author, journalist
- Dylan Brady (born 1993), musician (half of 100 gecs)
- William S. Burroughs (1914–1997), author (Naked Lunch)
- Kate Chopin (1851–1904), author (The Awakening) and early feminist
- Guy Anthony De Marco (born 1963), author of speculative fiction
- Lester Dent (1904–1959), author of Doc Savage novels
- Michele Dunaway (born 1965), author of romantic novels
- Suzette Haden Elgin (1936–2015), science-fiction author and linguist
- T. S. Eliot (1888–1965), poet, dramatist and literary critic
- Mary Engelbreit (born 1952), graphic artist, children's book illustrator
- Michael Evans (1944–2005), photographer
- Eugene Field (1850–1895), writer and poet
- Gillian Flynn (born 1971), novelist, television critic
- Martha Gellhorn (1908–1998), novelist, travel writer, and journalist
- Steve Gerber (1947–2008), comic book writer and co-creator of Howard the Duck
- David L. Harrison (born 1937), children's author, poet, recipient of the Missourian Award (2006)
- William Least Heat-Moon (born 1939), author
- Robert A. Heinlein (1907–1988), science fiction author
- Frederick Hibbard (1881–1950), sculptor known for his works of famous 19th-century figures
- Langston Hughes (1902–1967), African-American poet, novelist, and playwright
- William W. Johnstone (1938–2004), author of western, horror, and survivalist novels
- Donald Judd (1928–1994), artist
- Oliver Lee Jackson (born 1935), painter, sculptor, draftsman, and printmaker
- Sybil Kaplan (1938-2023), journalist and author
- Jim Lee (born 1964), comic book artist and writer
- Bonnie Leman (1926–2010), writer, historian, and founder of Quilter's Newsletter Magazine
- Laura Les (born 1994), musician (one half of 100 gecs)
- David Limbaugh (born 1952), columnist, author, and political commentator
- Bernarr Macfadden (1868–1955), founder of Macfadden Publications, bodybuilding advocate
- Cornelia F. Maury (1866–1942), pastel artist
- Dennis L. McKiernan (born 1932), author
- Scott Monteith, artist
- Marianne Moore (1887–1972), poet and writer
- Archie Musick (1902–1978), painter and illustrator, associated with the Regionalist movement
- John R. Musick (1849–1901), author and poet, known for the Columbian Historical novels
- Ruth Ann Musick (1897–1974), author and folklorist
- H. Richard Niebuhr (1894–1962), author, theologian
- Reinhold Niebuhr (1892–1971), author, theologian, and political commentator
- Isabel Richey (1858–1910), writer, poet
- John Ross (born 1957), author
- Charles Marion Russell (1864–1926), artist
- Clay Shirky (born 1964), writer, consultant, lecturer, author of Here Comes Everybody
- Kimora Lee Simmons (born 1975), fashion model, author, actress
- Minnetta Theodora Taylor (1860–1911), poet, lyricist, writer
- Sara Teasdale (1884–1933), poet
- Kay Thompson (1909–1998), creator of Eloise children's books
- Ernest Trova (1927–2009), sculptor, surrealist and pop art painter best known for The Falling Man
- Margaret Truman (1924–2008), novelist and non-fiction author
- Mark Twain (1835–1910), born Samuel Clemens, iconic humorist, author and creator of Huckleberry Finn and Tom Sawyer
- Rosa Kershaw Walker (1840s–1909), author, journalist, newspaper editor
- Laura Ingalls Wilder (1867–1957), writer and author of Little House series
- Tennessee Williams (1911–1983), playwright (born in Mississippi, grew up in St. Louis)
- Bertha M. Wilson (1874–1936), dramatist
- Daniel Woodrell (1953–2025), author of crime fiction

== Sportspeople ==
=== Auto racing ===
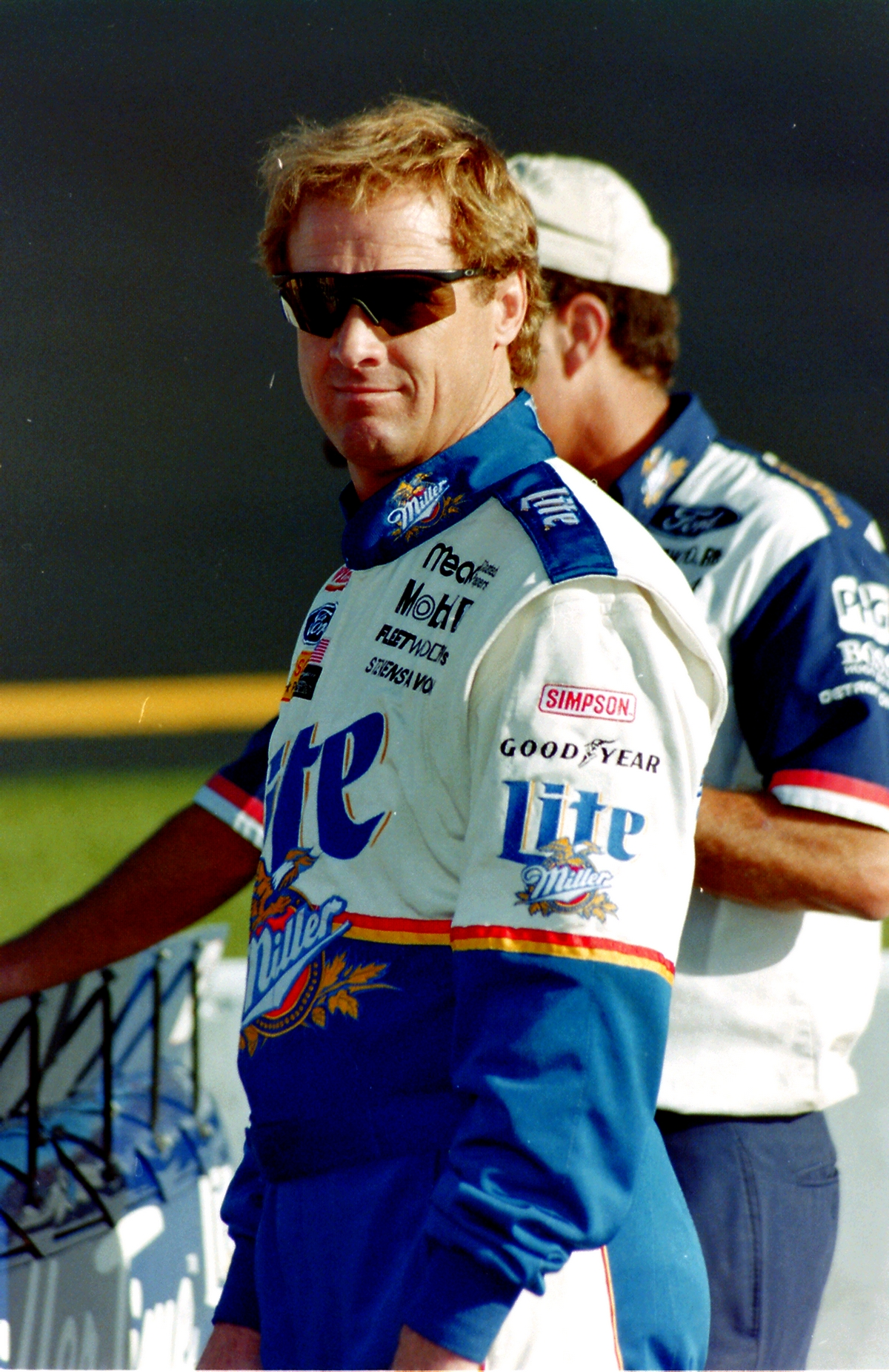
Rusty Wallace

- Paul Dana (1975–2006), IndyCar Series driver
- Lloyd Dane (1925–2015), NASCAR driver
- Russ Dugger (born 1975), NASCAR Truck Series driver
- Carl Edwards (born 1979), NASCAR driver, 2007 NASCAR Busch Series champion
- James Ince (born c. 1969), NASCAR crew chief
- Justin Jennings (born 1992), NASCAR driver
- Cody Lane (born 1996), NASCAR Truck Series driver
- Justin Marks (born 1981), NASCAR driver
- Jamie McMurray (born 1976), NASCAR Cup Series driver, Daytona 500 winner
- Larry Phillips (1942–2004), NASCAR driver
- Tony Roper (1964–2000), NASCAR driver
- Ken Schrader (born 1955), NASCAR driver
- Dorsey Schroeder (born 1953), retired NASCAR driver, Speed Channel color analyst
- Ramo Stott (1934–2021), retired NASCAR driver
- Chrissy Wallace (born 1988), NASCAR driver
- Kenny Wallace (born 1963), NASCAR driver, broadcaster
- Mike Wallace (born 1959), NASCAR driver
- Rusty Wallace (born 1956), NASCAR driver, 1989 NASCAR Winston Cup champion

=== Baseball ===
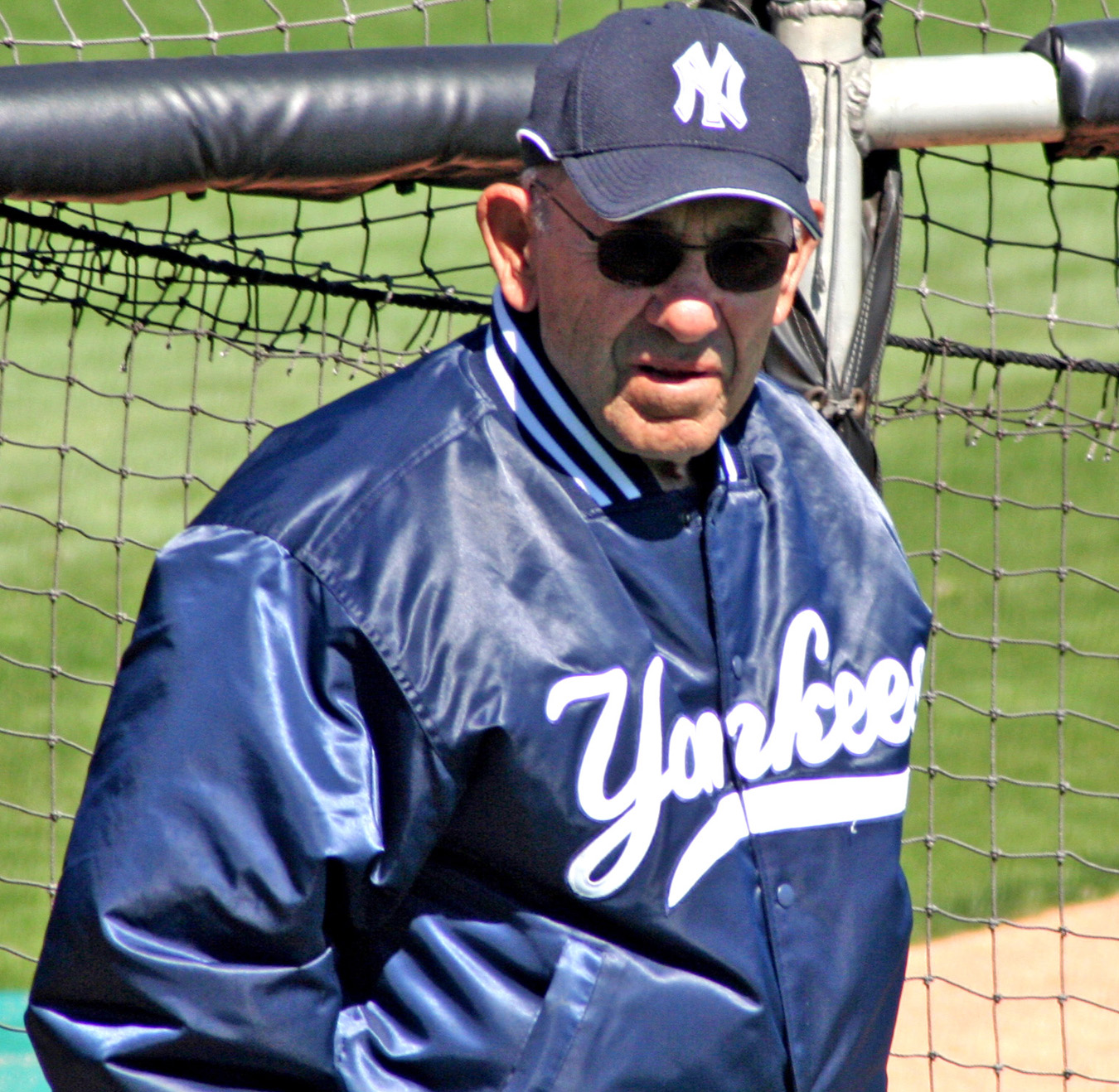
Yogi Berra

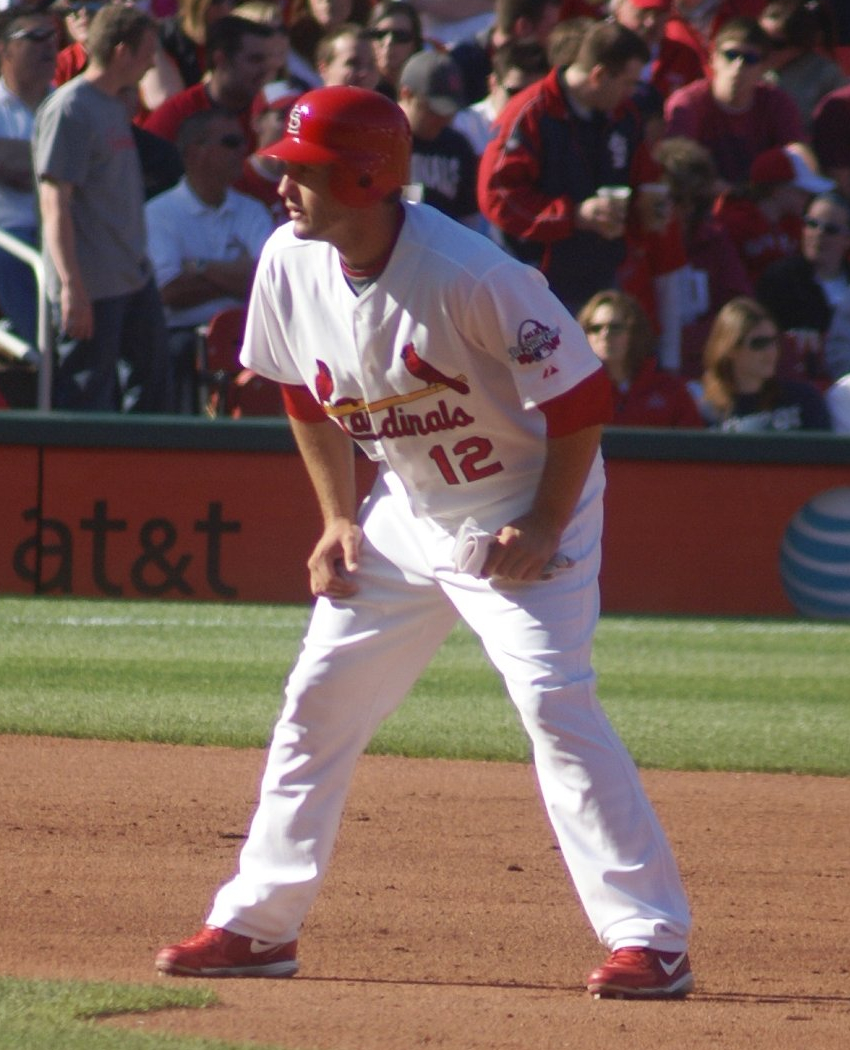
David Freese

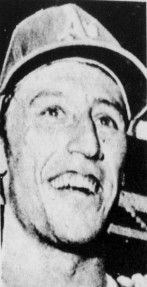
Ken Holtzman

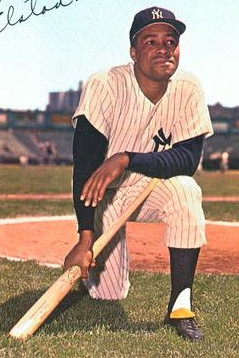
Elston Howard

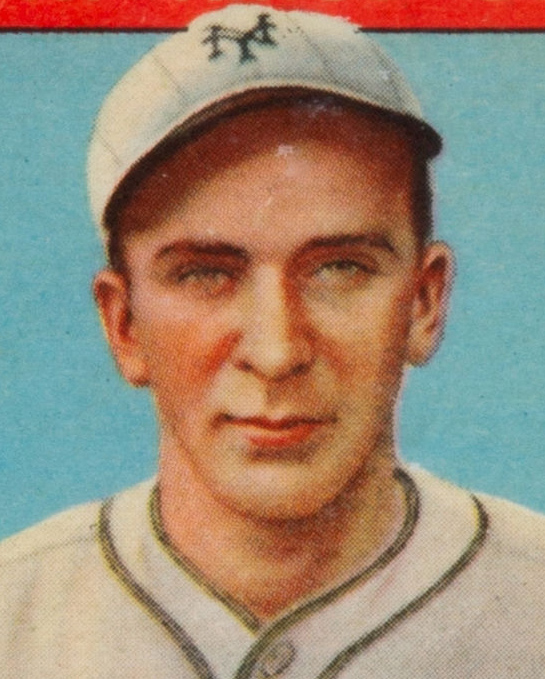
Carl Hubbell

A–M

- Bob Allison (1934–1995), MLB outfielder, 3-time All-Star
- Jake Arrieta (born 1986), Chicago Cubs pitcher, Cy Young Award winner
- Alan Ashby (born 1951), MLB catcher, commentator
- George Baker (1857–1915), MLB catcher
- Jake Beckley (1867–1919), infielder in Hall of Fame
- James "Cool Papa" Bell (1903–1991), Baseball Hall of Fame center fielder
- Yogi Berra (1925–2015), Hall of Fame catcher, manager, aphorist
- Ken Berry (born 1941), MLB outfielder
- Brian Boehringer (born 1969), MLB pitcher
- Clete Boyer (1937–2007), MLB third baseman, 2-time World Series winner
- Ken Boyer (1931–1982), MLB third baseman, 11-time All-Star, coach and manager
- Jack Brennan (1862–1914), MLB catcher
- Harry Bright (1929–2000), MLB infielder
- Mark Buehrle (born 1979), MLB pitcher, 5-time All-Star
- Bobby Byrne (1884–1964), MLB infielder
- Scott Carroll (born 1984), MLB relief pitcher
- Nate Colbert (1946–2023), MLB first baseman, 3-time All-Star
- David Cone (born 1963), Cy Young-winning MLB pitcher
- Joe Crede (born 1978), MLB third baseman
- Bob Dernier (born 1957), MLB outfielder
- Ross Detwiler (born 1986), MLB relief pitcher
- Blake DeWitt (born 1985), MLB infielder
- John Donaldson (1891–1970), Negro league baseball pitcher
- Scott Elbert (born 1985), MLB relief pitcher
- A. J. Ellis (born 1981), catcher for Miami Marlins
- Hoot Evers (1921–1991), MLB outfielder, 2-time All-Star
- David Freese (born 1983), MLB third baseman, 2011 World Series MVP with St. Louis Cardinals
- Gabe Gabler (1930–2014), MLB player
- Joe Garagiola (1926–2016), MLB catcher, broadcaster, television personality
- Jeff Gray (born 1981), MLB pitcher
- Charlie Grimm (1898–1993), MLB player and manager
- Dick Hall (born 1930), MLB pitcher, 2-time World Series winner
- Lucas Harrell (born 1985), starting pitcher for Toronto Blue Jays
- Tom Henke (born 1957), two-time All-Star pitcher
- Bobby Hofman (1925–1994), MLB outfielder
- Solly Hofman (1882–1956), MLB outfielder
- Al Hollingsworth (1908–1996), MLB pitcher
- Ken Holtzman (born 1945), two-time All-Star baseball pitcher
- Tommy Hottovy (born 1981), MLB relief pitcher
- Elston Howard (1929–1980), Negro league and MLB catcher, 12-time All-Star, six World Series titles
- Ryan Howard (born 1979), MLB first baseman, 3-time All-Star
- Carl Hubbell (1903–1988), Hall of Fame pitcher, 2-time NL MVP
- Eric Hurley (born 1985), MLB pitcher
- Ron Hunt (born 1941), MLB infielder, 2-time All-Star
- Vern Kennedy (1907–1993), MLB pitcher
- Bob Keppel (born 1982), MLB pitcher
- Charlie Kerfeld (born 1963), MLB relief pitcher, primarily with Houston Astros
- Johnny Kling (1875–1947), MLB catcher, 2-time World Series winner
- Darold Knowles (born 1941), MLB pitcher, first to pitch in all seven games of a World Series
- Ron Kulpa (born 1968), umpire
- Tito Landrum (born 1954), MLB outfielder
- Tommy Layne (born 1984), MLB relief pitcher
- Sam LeCure (born 1984), MLB pitcher
- Dale Long (1926–1991), MLB outfielder
- Jerry Lumpe (1933–2014), MLB infielder
- Shaun Marcum (born 1981), MLB pitcher
- Jay Marshall (born 1983), MLB pitcher
- Bake McBride (born 1949), MLB outfielder, 1974 Rookie of Year
- Paul Menhart (born 1969), MLB pitcher and pitching coach
- Bob Miller (1939–1993), MLB pitcher, 3-time World Series winner
- Zach Miner (born 1982), relief pitcher for Seattle Mariners
- Logan Morrison (born 1987), outfielder for Tampa Bay Rays
- Carl Morton (1944–1983), MLB pitcher, 1970 Rookie of Year
- Bill Mueller (born 1971), MLB infielder, 2003 AL batting champ
- Don Mueller (1927–2011), MLB infielder, 2-time All-Star
- Stan Musial (1920–2013), MLB Hall of Famer, played entire career for St. Louis Cardinals

N–Z

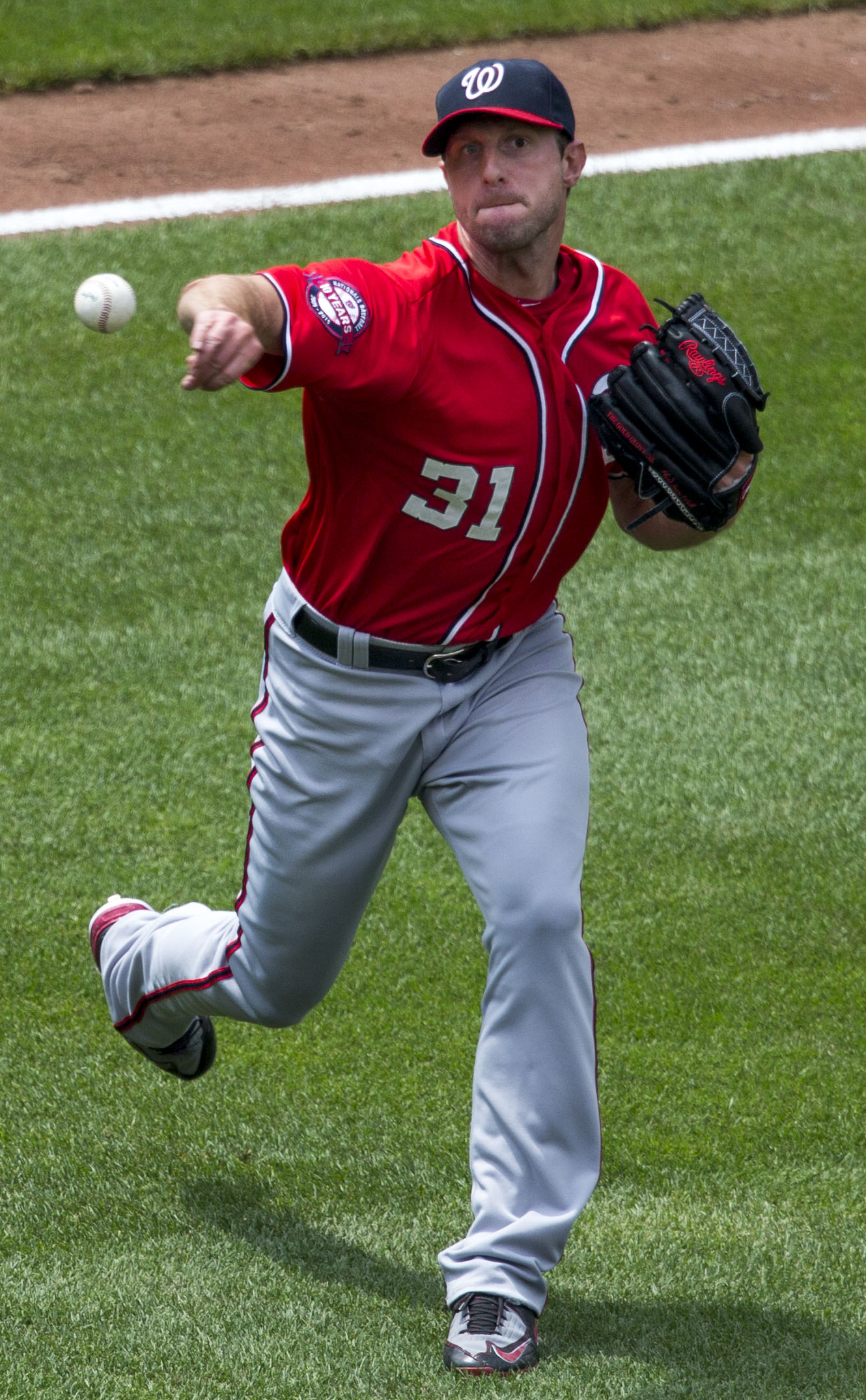
Max Scherzer

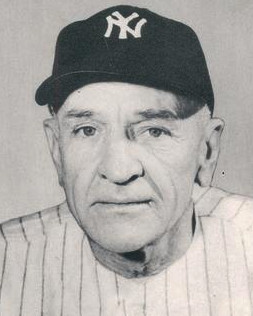
Casey Stengel

- Dave Nicholson (1939–2023), MLB outfielder
- Al Nipper (born 1959), MLB pitcher and scout
- Darren Oliver (born 1970), MLB relief pitcher
- Mickey O'Neil (1900–1964), MLB catcher
- Josh Outman (born 1984), MLB pitcher
- Mickey Owen (1916–2005), MLB catcher, 4-time All-Star
- Barney Pelty (1880–1939), MLB pitcher
- David Phelps (born 1986), starting pitcher for Miami Marlins
- Albert Pujols (born 1980), MLB first baseman with Los Angeles Angels, 10-time All-Star
- Pete Reiser (1919–1981), MLB outfielder, 3-time All-Star
- Steve Rogers (born 1949), MLB pitcher, 5-time All-Star
- Trevor Rosenthal (born 1990), pitcher for St. Louis Cardinals
- Bob Scheffing (1913–1985), MLB player and manager
- Max Scherzer (born 1984), starting pitcher for Washington Nationals
- Art Shamsky (born 1941), MLB outfielder and Israel Baseball League manager
- Mike Shannon (1939–2023), MLB player and sportscaster for St. Louis Cardinals, 2-time World Series winner
- Sonny Siebert (born 1937), MLB pitcher, 2-time All-Star
- Dave Silvestri (born 1967), MLB infielder
- Shae Simmons (born 1990), MLB pitcher
- Roy Smalley Jr. (1926–2011), MLB infielder
- Al Smith (1928–2002), MLB outfielder
- Paul Splittorff (1946–2011), pitcher for Kansas City Royals, broadcaster
- Casey Stengel (1890–1975), Baseball Hall of Fame manager
- Mel Stottlemyre (1941–2019), MLB pitcher, 5-time All-Star, pitching coach
- Rick Sutcliffe (born 1956), MLB pitcher, 3-time All-Star, TV commentator
- Nick Tepesch (born 1988), MLB pitcher
- Jacob Turner (born 1991), MLB pitcher
- Scott Van Slyke (born 1986), outfielder, Los Angeles Dodgers; son of Andy Van Slyke
- Luke Voit (born 1991), MLB first baseman
- Earl Weaver (1930–2013), Hall of Fame manager for Baltimore Orioles
- Mack Wheat (1893–1979), MLB catcher with Brooklyn Robins and Philadelphia Phillies
- Zack Wheat (1888–1972), MLB Hall of Fame left fielder for Brooklyn, Philadelphia Athletics; brother of Mack Wheat
- Dick Williams (1929–2011), MLB player and Hall of Fame manager
- Lefty Williams (1893–1959), MLB pitcher
- Smoky Joe Wood (1889–1995), MLB pitcher, 3-time World Series winner
- Glenn Wright (1901–1984), MLB infielder for 1925 World Series champion Pittsburgh Pirates

=== Basketball ===
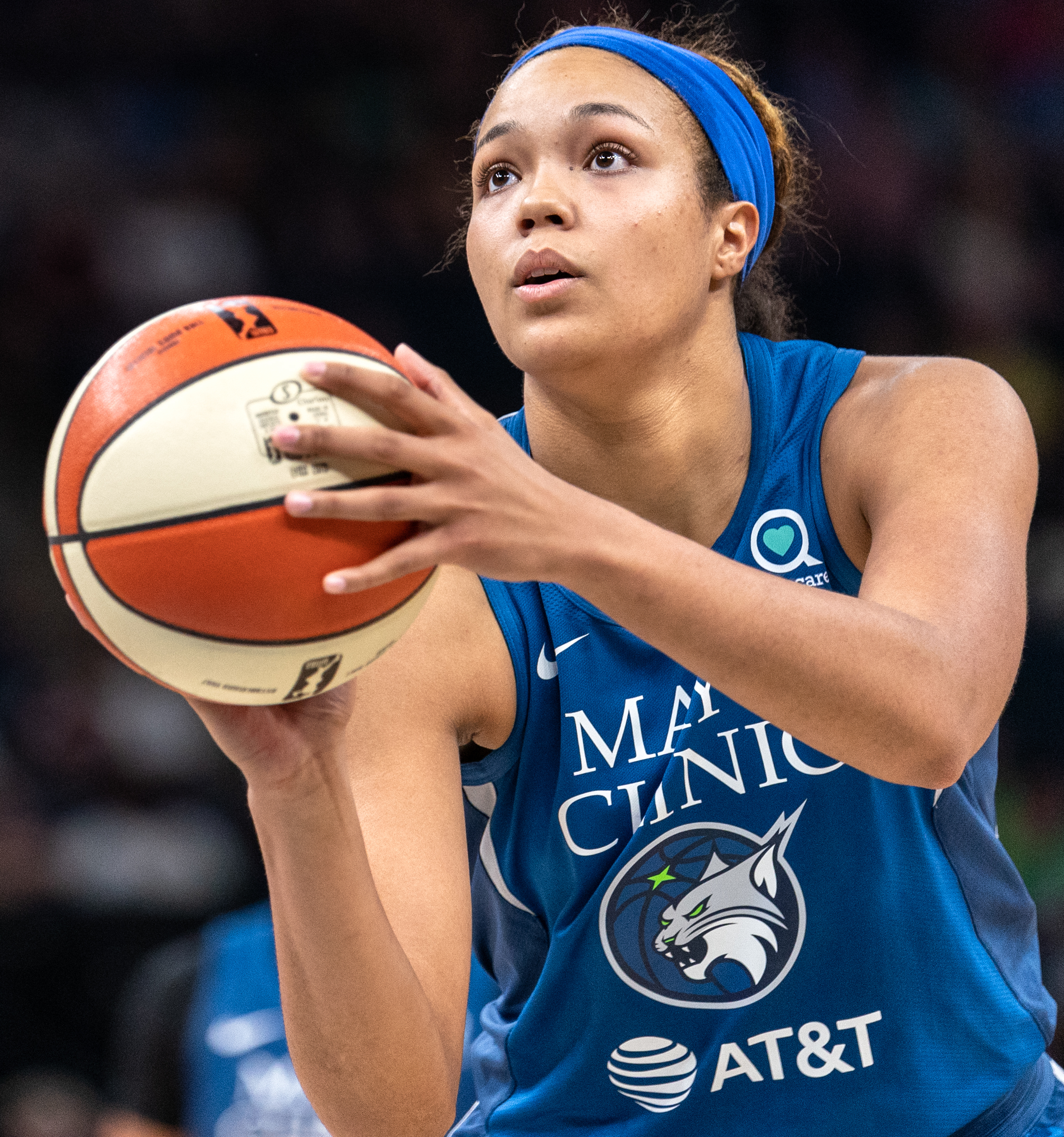
Napheesa Collier

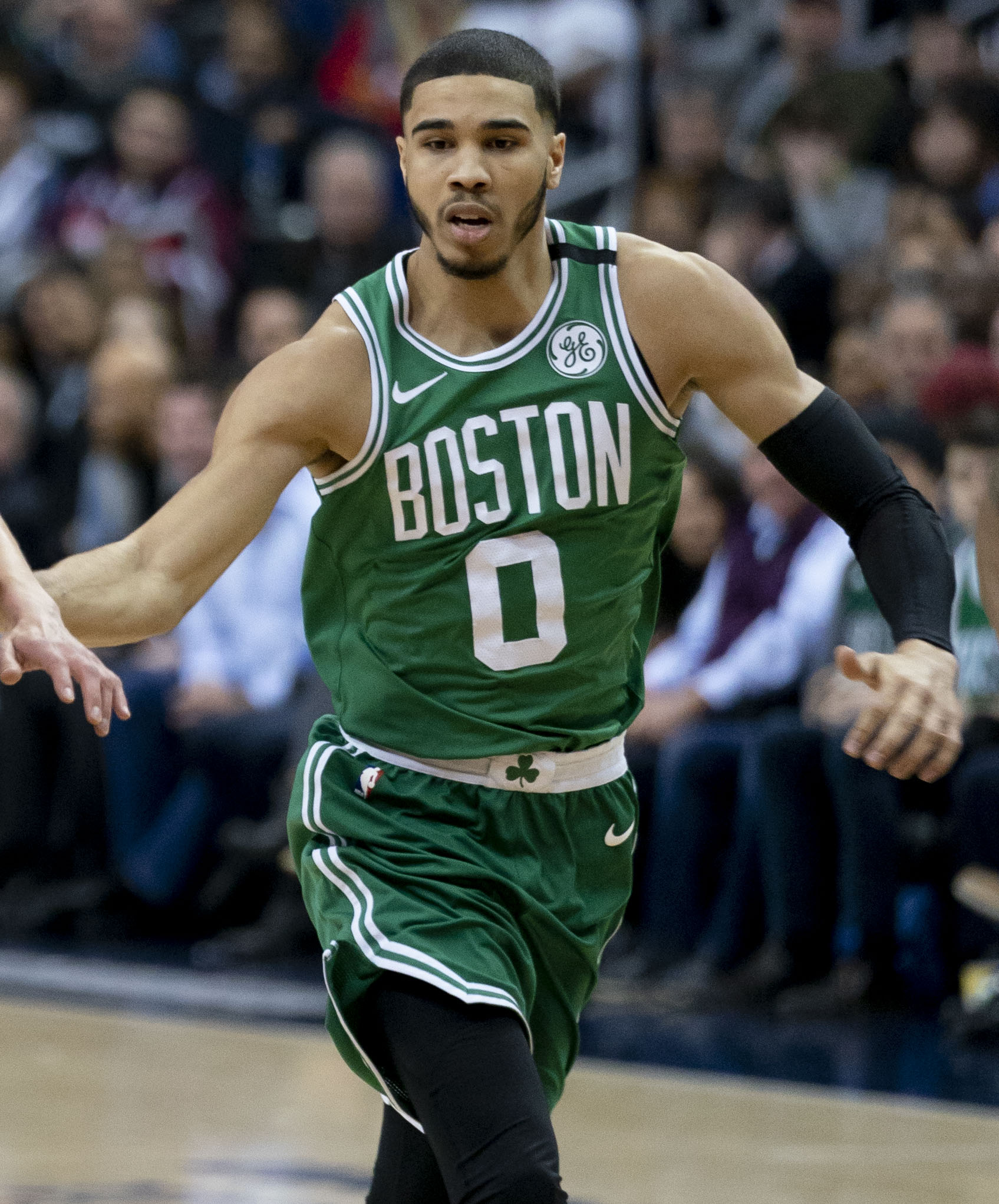
Jayson Tatum

- Forrest Clare "Phog" Allen (1885–1974), Hall of Fame college basketball coach
- OG Anunoby (born 1997), small forward for Toronto Raptors and New York Knicks
- Bradley Beal (born 1993), NBA player for the Washington Wizards and Los Angeles Clippers
- Bill Bradley (born 1943), Basketball Hall of Famer, U.S. senator
- Alec Burks (born 1991), shooting guard for Golden State Warriors
- Chris Carr (born 1974), shooting guard for six NBA teams
- Napheesa Collier (born 1996), WNBA player and Olympic gold medalist
- Sophie Cunningham (born 1996), WNBA player for Phoenix Mercury and Indiana Fever
- Ben Hansbrough (born 1987), guard for Indiana Pacers
- Tyler Hansbrough (born 1985), NBA player and international player, NCAA champion at North Carolina
- Josh Harrellson (born 1989), center for New York Knicks
- Larry Hughes (born 1979), shooting guard for eight NBA teams
- David Lee (born 1983), power forward and center for San Antonio Spurs
- Saben Lee (born 1999), basketball player for Maccabi Tel Aviv of the Israeli Basketball Premier League
- Tyronn Lue (born 1977), NBA player, head coach of Cleveland Cavaliers and Los Angeles Clippers
- Patrick McCaw (born 1995), shooting guard for Toronto Raptors
- Dan Pippin (1926–1965), Olympic gold medalist in 1952, played at Mizzou
- Brandon Rush (born 1985), NBA player for Golden State Warriors
- Kareem Rush (born 1980), shooting guard for Los Angeles Clippers
- Scott Sims (born 1955), guard for San Antonio Spurs
- Xavier Sneed (born 1997), basketball player in the Israeli Basketball Premier League
- Norm Stewart (born 1935), pro basketball player, longtime Mizzou coach, College Basketball Hall of Fame
- Jayson Tatum (born 1998), pro basketball player, former member of the Duke Blue Devils and small forward for the Boston Celtics
- David Thirdkill (born 1960), NBA basketball player, 1993 Israeli Basketball Premier League MVP
- Anthony Tolliver (born 1985), power forward for Minnesota Timberwolves
- Alex Tyus (born 1988), American-Israeli professional basketball player, also plays for the Israeli national basketball team
- Ish Wainright (born 1994), American-Ugandan forward for Hapoel Tel Aviv of the Israeli Basketball Premier League, formerly in the NBA

=== Football ===
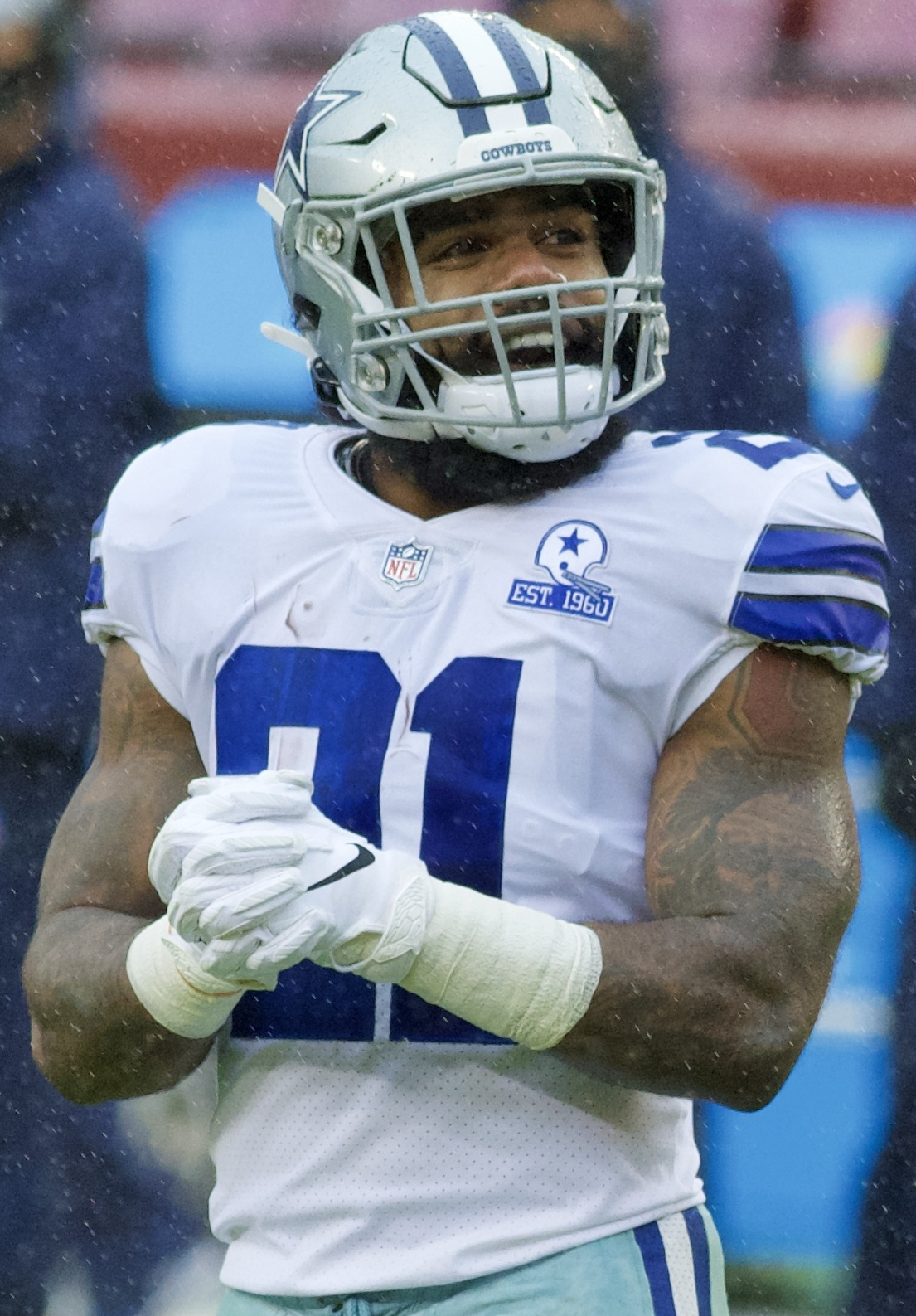
Ezekiel Elliott

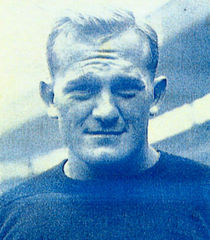
Cal Hubbard

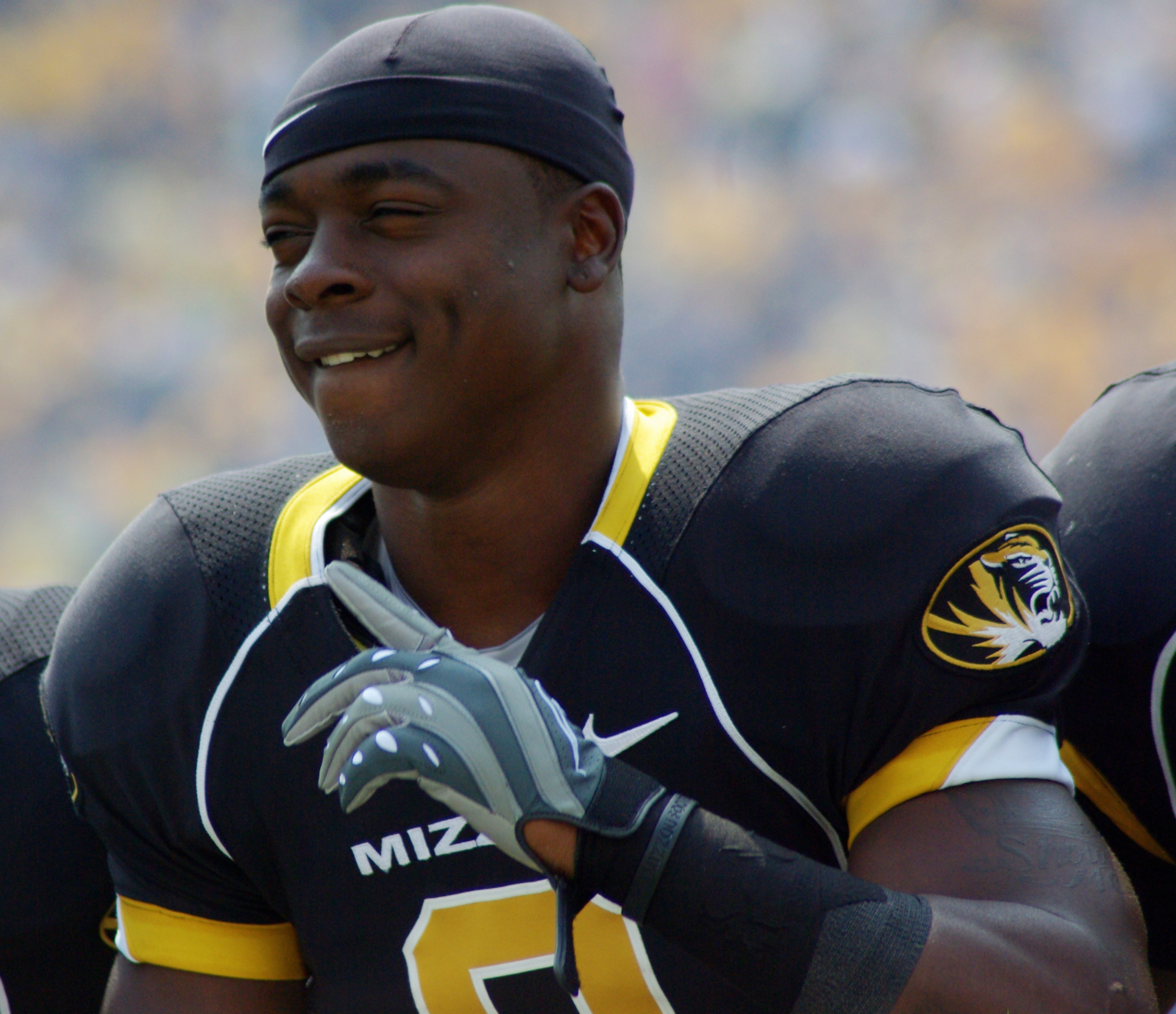
Jeremy Maclin

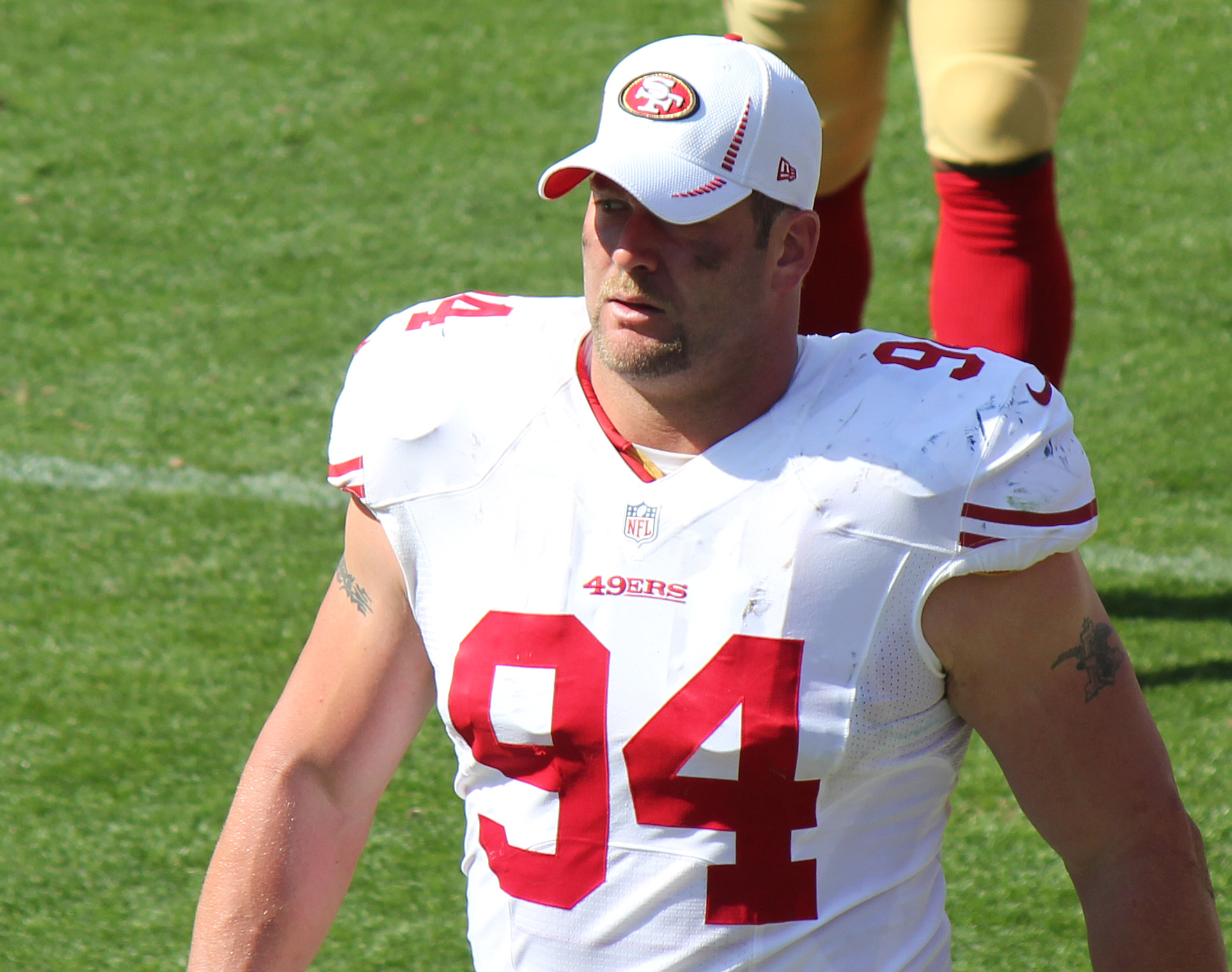
Justin Smith

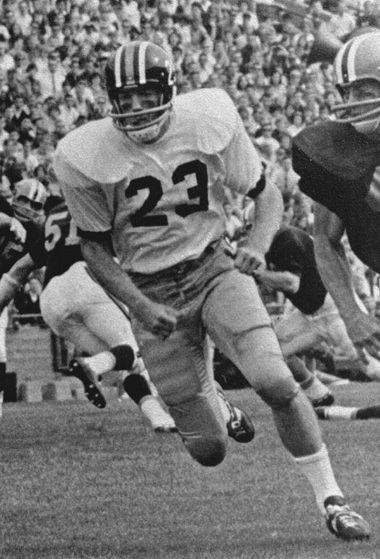
Roger Wehrli

- Maurice Alexander (born 1991), defensive back for St. Louis Rams
- Steve Atwater (born 1966), safety for the Denver Broncos and New York Jets
- Allen Barbre (born 1984), offensive guard for Philadelphia Eagles
- Tim Barnes (born 1988), center for St. Louis Rams
- David Bass (born 1990), defensive end for Chicago Bears
- Justin Britt (born 1991), offensive tackle for Seattle Seahawks
- Jason Brookins (born 1976), running back, Baltimore Ravens
- Colin Brown (born 1985), offensive tackle for Buffalo Bills
- Jairus Byrd (born 1986), free safety for New Orleans Saints
- Paul Christman (1918–1970), quarterback, College Football Hall of Fame; sportscaster
- Adrian Clayborn (born 1988), defensive end for Atlanta Falcons
- Chase Coffman (born 1986), tight end for Atlanta Falcons
- Jalen Collins (born 1993), cornerback for Atlanta Falcons
- Maliek Collins (born 1995), defensive tackle for Dallas Cowboys
- Dan Connolly (born 1982), offensive lineman for New England Patriots
- Jimmy Conzelman (1898–1970), former NFL halfback and coach, member of Pro Football Hall of Fame
- Dan Dierdorf (born 1949), offensive tackle in Pro Football Hall of Fame, sportscaster
- Herb Donaldson (born 1985), running back for Dallas Cowboys
- Robert Douglas (born 1982), NFL fullback
- Kony Ealy (born 1991), defensive end for Carolina Panthers
- Ezekiel Elliott (born 1995), NFL running back for Dallas Cowboys
- Lenvil Elliott (1951–2008), NFL running back
- Don Faurot (1902–1995), College Football Hall of Fame coach, inventor of split-T formation
- Brian Folkerts (born 1990), center for Carolina Panthers
- Josh Freeman (born 1988), NFL quarterback
- Blaine Gabbert (born 1989), quarterback for Arizona Cardinals
- Justin Gage (born 1981), wide receiver for Tennessee Titans
- E. J. Gaines (born 1992), cornerback for St. Louis Rams
- Tony Galbreath (born 1954), NFL running back
- Markus Golden (born 1991), NFL outside linebacker
- Conrad Goode (born 1962), NFL offensive lineman
- Dorial Green-Beckham (born 1993), NFL wide receiver
- Mark Herzlich (born 1987), linebacker for New York Giants
- Cal Hubbard (1900–1977), only person in both Baseball Hall of Fame and Pro Football Hall of Fame
- Brandon Joyce (1984–2010), offensive lineman, CFL and NFL
- Terry Joyce (1954–2011), college All-American, NFL punter
- Howard Kindig (born 1941), defensive end, 10-year NFL career
- Ryan Lilja (born 1981), guard for Kansas City Chiefs
- Brandon Lloyd (born 1981), wide receiver for San Francisco 49ers
- Jeremy Maclin (born 1988), wide receiver for Kansas City Chiefs
- Marvin McNutt (born 1989), wide receiver for Philadelphia Eagles
- Eric Moore (born 1965), NFL guard
- William Moore (born 1985), safety for Atlanta Falcons
- C. J. Mosley (born 1983), defensive tackle for Miami Dolphins
- Eddie Moss, special teams for St. Louis Cardinals
- Jim Musick (1910–1992), running back, Boston Redskins
- Neil Rackers (born 1976), placekicker for Houston Texans
- Shane Ray (born 1993), outside linebacker for Denver Broncos
- Sheldon Richardson (born 1990), defensive end for New York Jets
- Gijon Robinson (born 1984), tight end for Indianapolis Colts
- Martin Rucker (born 1985), tight end for Dallas Cowboys
- Mike Rucker (born 1975), defensive end for Carolina Panthers
- Aldon Smith (born 1989), linebacker for Oakland Raiders
- Justin Smith (born 1979), defensive end for San Francisco 49ers
- Bill Snyder (born 1939), current Kansas State University head coach and College Football Hall of Fame
- Donald Stephenson (born 1988), offensive tackle for Kansas City Chiefs
- Roger Wehrli (born 1947), Hall of Fame cornerback with St. Louis Cardinals
- James Wilder Sr. (born 1958), 10-year NFL running back
- Brandon Williams (born 1989), nose tackle for Baltimore Ravens
- Gregg Williams (born 1958), NFL coach, defensive coordinator
- Sylvester Williams (born 1988), nose tackle for Denver Broncos
- Kellen Winslow (born 1957), Hall of Fame tight end with San Diego Chargers

=== Golf ===
- Amy Alcott (born 1956), professional golfer, World Golf Hall of Fame
- Brandel Chamblee (born 1962), PGA Tour golfer
- Jay Haas (born 1953), PGA Tour golfer
- Hale Irwin (born 1945), golfer; oldest person (45) to win US Open (1990)
- Jeff Maggert (born 1964), PGA Tour golfer
- Tom Pernice Jr. (born 1959), PGA Tour golfer
- Judy Rankin (born 1945), professional golfer, World Golf Hall of Fame
- Johnny Revolta (1911–1991), winner of 1935 PGA Championship
- Cathy Reynolds (born 1957), LPGA Tour golfer
- Horton Smith (1908–1963), winner of first Masters, World Golf Hall of Fame
- Payne Stewart (1957–1999), golfer, 2-time US Open champion
- Tom Watson (born 1949), 8-time major champion, 1990 Ryder Cup captain, World Golf Hall of Fame
- Larry Ziegler (born 1939), PGA Tour golfer

=== Ice hockey ===
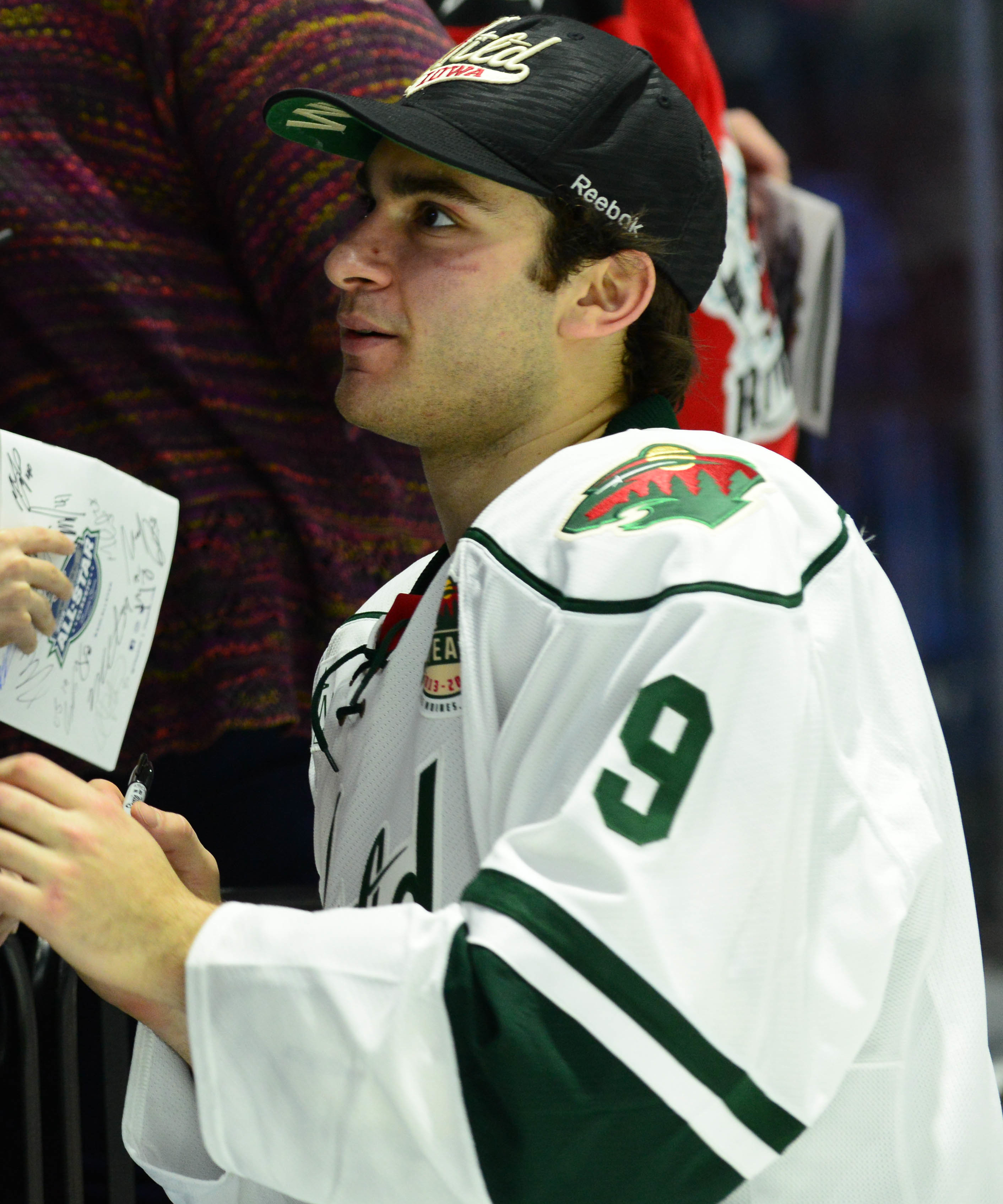
Luke Kunin

- Ben Bishop (born 1986), NHL Dallas Stars
- Michael Davies (born 1986), AHL Chicago Wolves
- Cam Janssen (born 1984), EIHL Nottingham Panthers
- Luke Kunin (born 1997), NHL hockey player
- Pat LaFontaine (born 1965), NHL Buffalo Sabres, New York Islanders, New York Rangers
- Patrick Maroon (born 1988), NHL Tampa Bay Lightning
- Mike McKenna (born 1983), AHL Portland Pirates
- Paul Stastny (born 1985), NHL St. Louis Blues
- Travis Turnbull (born 1986), DEL Düsseldorfer EG
- Joe Vitale (born 1985), NHL Arizona Coyotes
- Chris Wideman (born 1990), NHL Ottawa Senators
- Landon Wilson (born 1975), AHL Texas Stars

=== Professional wrestling ===
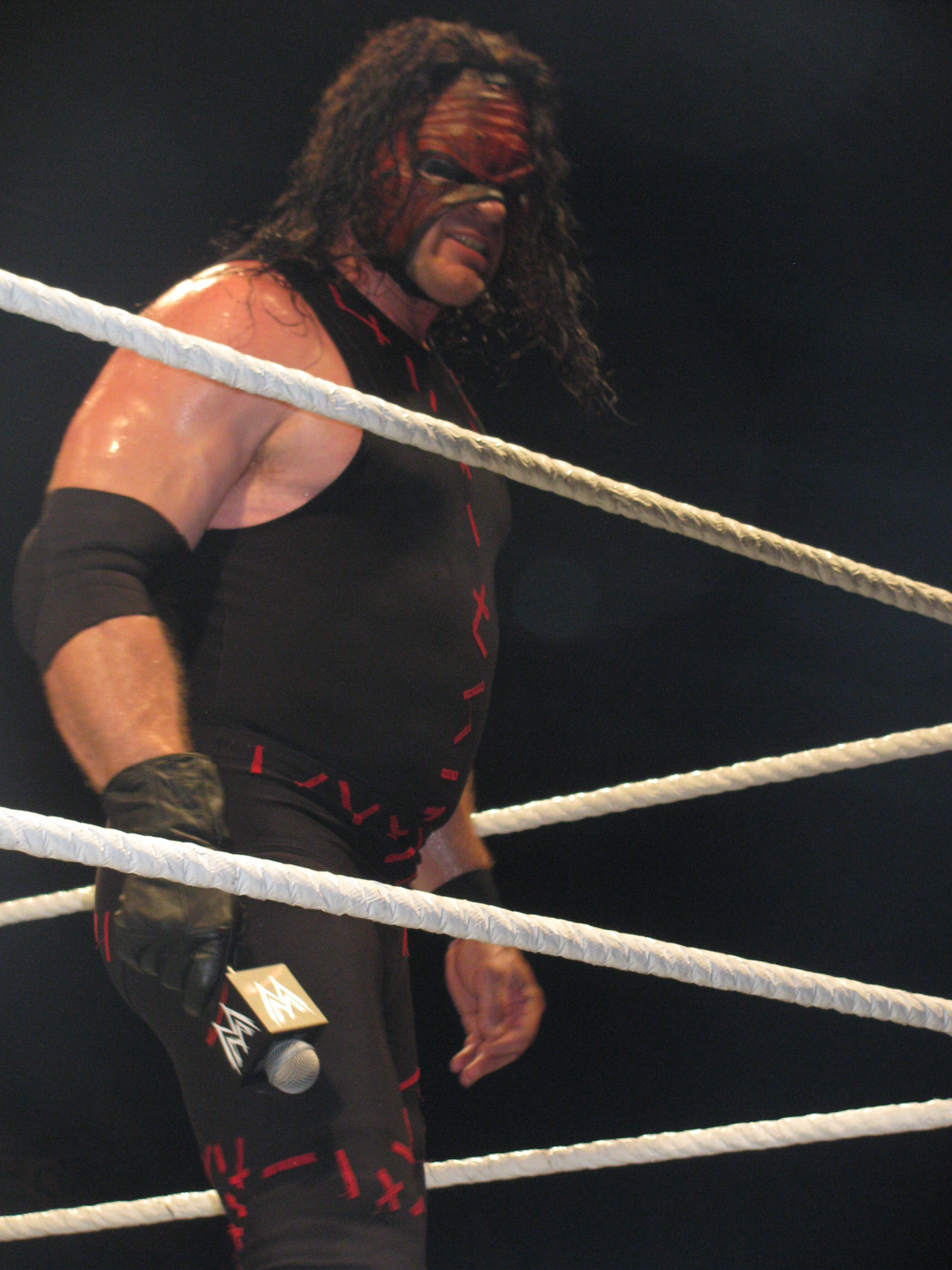
Glenn "Kane" Jacobs

- Freddie Blassie (1918–2003), wrestler and manager
- "Bulldog" Bob Brown (1938–1997), wrestler and booker
- Bob Geigel (1924–2014), retired wrestler, promoter, and former NWA President
- Glenn Jacobs (born 1967), ring name "Kane"; also an actor
- Rufus R. Jones (1933–1993), NWA wrestler and businessman
- Matthew Korklan (born 1983), ring names "Matt Sydal" and "Evan Bourne"
- Sam Muchnick (1905–1998), founder of St. Louis Wrestling Club and co-founder of the National Wrestling Alliance (NWA)
- Trevor Murdoch (born 1978), WWE tag team champion
- Matt Murphy (born 1979), wrestler and author
- Barry Orton, wrestler
- "Cowboy" Bob Orton (born 1950), wrestler and member of WWE Hall of Fame; father of Randy Orton
- Randy Orton (born 1980), third-generation pro wrestler
- Harley Race (1943–2019), 8-time NWA World Heavyweight Champion; member of the WWE Hall of Fame and Professional Wrestling Hall of Fame
- Butch Reed (1954–2021), NWA and WCW Tag Team Champion
- Lou Thesz (1916–2002), superstar of professional wrestling's "Golden Age"

=== Miscellaneous sports ===
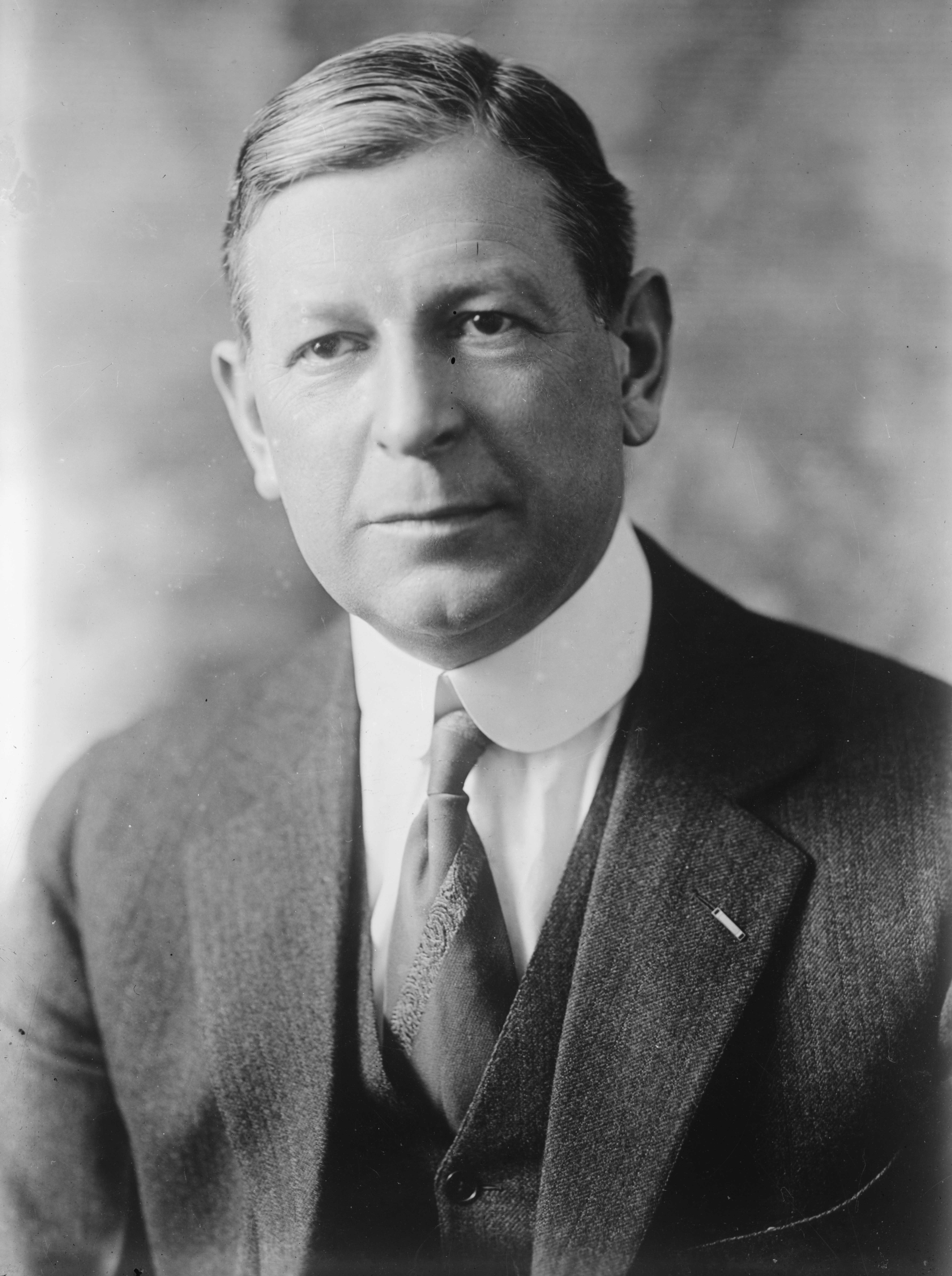
Dwight Davis

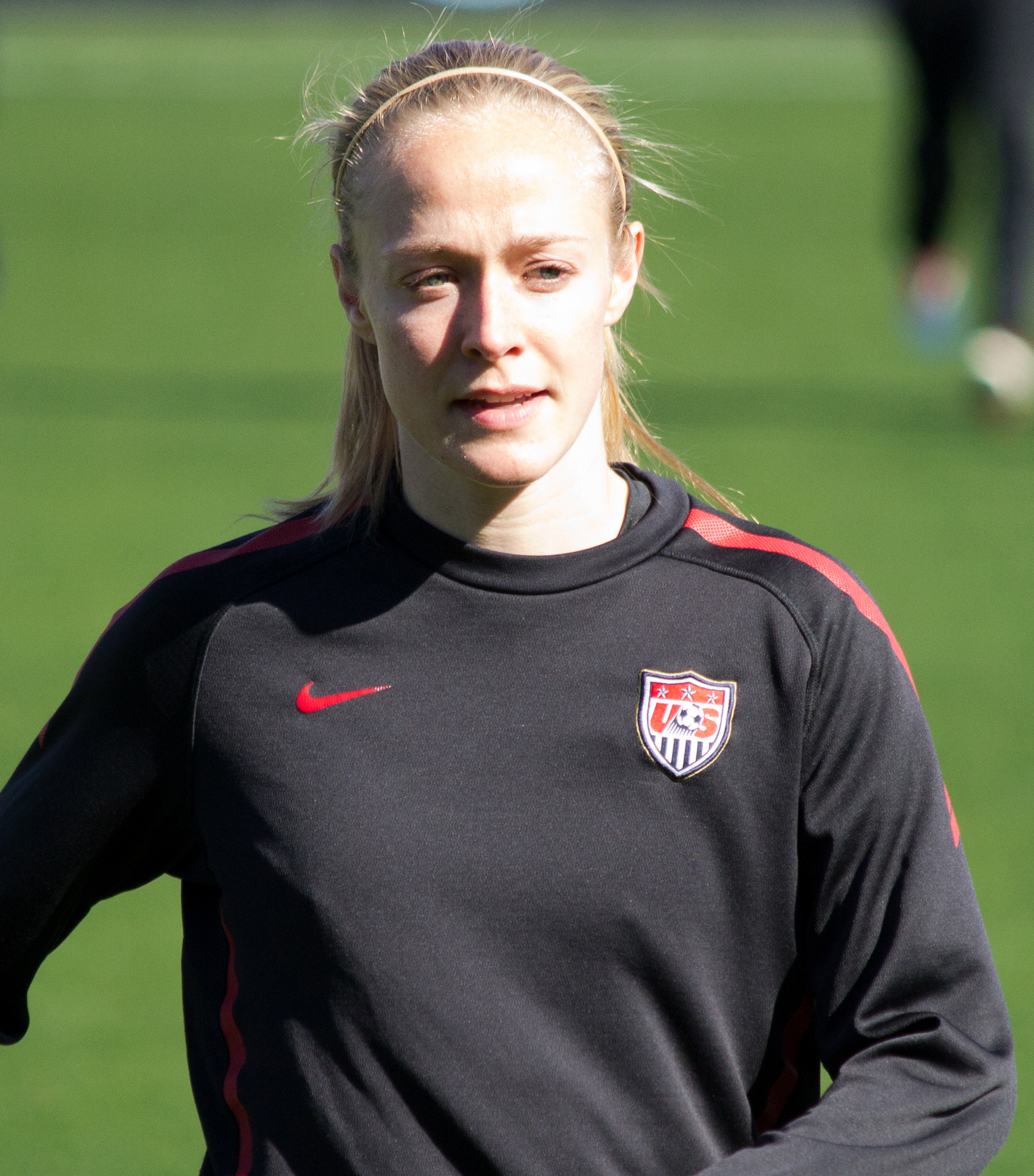
Becky Sauerbrunn

- Virgil Akins (1928–2011), welterweight boxing champion
- Devon Alexander (born 1987), boxer, WBC and IBF Light Welterweight champion
- Henry Armstrong (1912–1988), boxer (born in Mississippi but grew up in St. Louis)
- Butch Buchholz (born 1940), Hall of Fame tennis player
- Christian Cantwell (born 1980), Olympian, world champion shot putter
- John Coughlin (1985–2019), figure skater, committed suicide
- J'den Cox (born 1995), Olympic bronze medalist freestyle wrestler and two-time World Champion
- Michael Chandler (born 1986), UFC fighter
- Kim Chizevsky-Nicholls (born 1968), IFBB pro bodybuilder
- Dwight F. Davis (1879–1945), tennis player, founder of the Davis Cup
- Martin Jay Davis (1937–2022), astrologer, author, and Olympic fencer
- Lori Endicott (born 1967), volleyball player and Olympian
- Doris Hart (1925–2015), Hall of Fame tennis player, winner of six Grand Slam singles titles
- Sammie Henson (born 1971), Olympic silver medalist and World Champion in freestyle wrestling
- Bud Houser (1901–1994), three-time Olympic gold medalist in shot put and discus
- Ben A. Jones (1882–1961), thoroughbred horse trainer
- Horace A. "Jimmy" Jones (1906–2001), thoroughbred horse trainer
- Lesa Lewis (born 1967), IFBB professional bodybuilder
- Conn McCreary (1921–1979), Hall of Fame jockey, winner of 1944 and 1951 Kentucky Derby
- Chuck McKinley (1941–1986), Hall of Fame tennis player, 1963 Wimbledon champion
- Josh Prenot (born 1995), swimmer, Olympic silver medalist (200m breaststroke), NCAA champion (400m individual medley), and American record holder (200m breaststroke)
- DeAnna Price (born 1993), record holder in hammer throw, competed at two Olympic Summer Games
- Helen Stephens (1918–1994), two-time gold medalist in track and field at 1936 Summer Olympics
- Scott Touzinsky (born 1982), volleyball player and coach
- Alex White (born 1988), mixed martial artist
- Jacarra Winchester (born 1992), Olympic freestyle wrestler, world champion in 2019

=== Soccer ===
- Daryl Doran (born 1963), professional soccer player
- Jack Jewsbury (born 1981), professional soccer player
- Lucas Bartlett (born 1997), MLS St. Louis City
- John Klein (born 1999), MLS St. Louis City
- Tim Ream (born 1987), EPL Fulham
- Becky Sauerbrunn (born 1985), National Women's Soccer League and USWNT player (FC Kansas City); Defender of the Year 2013, 2014; 2015 FIFA Women's World Cup winner
- Taylor Twellman (born 1980), former professional soccer player, sportscaster

== Aviation and aerospace ==
- Thomas Akers (born 1953), scientist and NASA astronaut on four Space Shuttle missions
- Bill Lear (1902–1978), founder of Lear Jet
- Charles Lindbergh (1902–1974), aviator, first solo non-stop trans-Atlantic flight in 1927 (born in Detroit, Michigan but lived in St. Louis)
- James Smith McDonnell (1899–1980), founder of McDonnell Aircraft Corporation (later McDonnell Douglas)

== Business ==
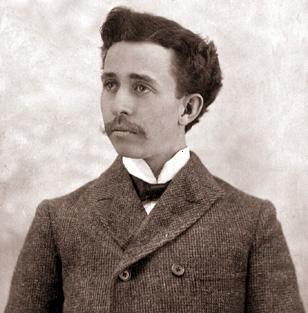
J. C. Penney

- William Henry Ashley (1778–1838), founder of Rocky Mountain Fur Company, politician
- Charles S. L. Baker (1859–1926), African-American businessman and inventor
- Henry W. Bloch (1922–2019), co-founder of H&R Block tax services
- Richard Bloch (1926–2004), co-founder of H&R Block tax services
- Adolphus Busch (1839–1913), founder of Anheuser-Busch (the world's largest brewer)
- August "Gussie" Busch (1899–1989), owned Anheuser-Busch (the world's largest brewer), and St. Louis Cardinals baseball team
- Jim Crane, businessman, owner of the Houston Astros
- William H. Danforth (1870–1955), founder of Ralston Purina Company
- John Doerr (born 1951), venture capitalist at Kleiner Perkins Caufield & Byers
- James Buchanan Eads (1820–1887), civil engineer and inventor
- Charles Eames (1907–1978), designer and architect
- David Glass (1935–2020), former president and CEO of Wal-Mart, owner of Kansas City Royals baseball team
- Joyce Hall (1891–1982), founder of Hallmark Cards
- William Preston Hall (1864–1932), circus empresario and animal broker
- Howard R. Hughes Sr. (1869–1924), oil drill bit and tool inventor; father of Howard Hughes, reclusive billionaire
- George M. Keller (1923–2008), chairman of Standard Oil Company of California in the 1980s
- R. Crosby Kemper Jr. (1927–2014), chairman emeritus UMB Financial Corporation, philanthropist
- William Thornton Kemper Sr. (1866–1938), patriarch of Kemper family railroad and banking empire which included Commerce Bancshares and United Missouri Bank
- Ewing Kauffman (1916–1993), pharmaceutical magnate, philanthropist, and founder of the Kansas City Royals baseball team
- Stan Kroenke (born 1947), owner of Kroenke Sports Enterprises
- Rebecca Mark-Jusbasche (born 1954), former head of Enron International
- N. O. Nelson (1844–1922), founder of the N. O. Nelson Manufacturing Company
- Thomas F. O'Neil, chairman of RKO General Studios, brought movies to television
- J. C. Penney (1875–1971), businessman and entrepreneur
- Rex Sinquefield (born 1944), financial executive who created Standard & Poor's first index fund, supporter of conservative political causes
- John Sperling (1921–2014), businessman and founder of the University of Phoenix
- Gerard Swope (1872–1957), president of General Electric
- Jack C. Taylor (1922–2016), founder of Enterprise Rent-A-Car, billionaire philanthropist
- Sam Walton (1918–1992), founder of Wal-Mart
- Robert E. Wood (1879–1969), vice-president of Sears Roebuck

== Criminals and outlaws ==
- Anthony Brancato (1913–1951), freelance Mafia gunman, half of "The Two Tonys" portrayed in the movie L.A. Confidential
- Ray and Faye Copeland (1914–1993, 1921–2003), serial killers, oldest couple ever sentenced to death in the United States
- Egan's Rats, early crime family in St. Louis
  - Leo Vincent Brothers (1899–1950), low-level member; later moved to Chicago and became part of Al Capone's organization
  - Fred Burke (1893–1940), gunman for Egan's Rats; suspected of participating in the St. Valentine's Day Massacre
  - William "Dint" Colbeck (1890–1943), assumed leadership of Egan's Rats after the assassination of Willie Egan
  - Walter Costello (1889–1917), bodyguard to Willie Egan, killer of Harry Dunn
  - Harry "Cherries" Dunn (1892–1916)
  - Thomas Egan (1874–1919), organizer of Egan's Rats
  - Willie Egan (1884–1921), brother and right-hand man of gang founder Tom Egan; led the gang after Tom's death
  - Max Greenberg (1883–1933), one of the few Jewish members of the mostly Irish Egan gang; associate/friend of Meyer Lansky
  - Frank Hackethal (1891–1954), robber and resort owner/money launderer for Egan's Rats
  - Thomas "Snake" Kinney (1868–1912), Missouri state senator and co-founder of Egan's Rats
  - David "Chippy" Robinson (1897–1967), bank robber and enforcer for Egan's Rats
  - William "Skippy" Rohan (1871–1916)
- Roy Gardner (1884–1940), arms smuggler and notorious 1920s bank robber
- Tom Horn (1860–1903), Old West lawman, army scout, outlaw and assassin
- Roscoe Jackson (1901–1937), murderer, last person to be publicly executed in the United States
- Kansas City crime family
  - Charles Binaggio (1909–1950), killed along with Charles Gargotta at the First Ward Democratic Club in downtown Kansas City
  - Anthony Brancato (1913–1951)
  - William "Willie Rat" Cammisano (1914–1995), enforcer for the K.C. mob
  - Charles Carrollo (1902–1979), led the Kansas City mob after Johnny Lazia's assassination
  - Anthony Civella (1930–2006), led the K.C. crime family in the 1980s and 1990s; son of Carl Civella and nephew of Nicholas Civella
  - Carl "Cork" Civella (1910–1994), brother of Nicholas Civella and a top lieutenant in the crime family; father of Anthony Civella
  - Nicholas Civella (1912–1983), led the Kansas City crime family from the 1950s through the 1970s
  - Carl "Tuffy" DeLuna (1927–2008), underboss of the Kansas City crime family; brother-in-law of Anthony Civella
  - Charles "Pretty Boy" Floyd (1904–1934), took part in the Union Station Massacre
  - Charles "Mad Dog" Gargotta (1900–1950), top enforcer of the KC crime family
  - Anthony Gizzo (1902–1953), led Kansas City crime family in the early 1950s
  - John Lazia (1896–1934), leader of the Kansas City crime family in the 1920s and early 1930s
- Kenneth Lay (1942–2006), chairman and CEO of Enron, convicted of securities fraud
- Little Britches (1879 – year of death unknown), female bandit associated with Cattle Annie and the Doolin gang
- James Earl Ray (1928–1998), assassin of civil rights leader Martin Luther King Jr.; escapee from the Missouri State Penitentiary
- James-Younger Gang:
  - Frank James (1843–1915), outlaw
  - Jesse James (1847–1882), outlaw
  - Cole Younger (1844–1916), outlaw
  - John Younger (1851–1874), outlaw
  - Bob Younger (1853–1899), outlaw
  - Jim Younger (1848–1902), outlaw
  - Bob Ford (1862–1892), outlaw who gunned down Jesse James
- Tom Pendergast (1873–1945), long-time political boss of Kansas City and western Missouri; responsible for the political rise of Harry S. Truman; imprisoned for tax evasion
- Belle Starr (1848–1889), female outlaw of the Old West
- St. Louis crime family
  - Anthony Giordano (1914–1980), leader of the St. Louis crime family in the 1960s and 1970s
  - Matthew Trupiano (1938–1997), nephew of Anthony Giordano, crime family boss in the 1980s
  - John Vitale (1909–1982), crime family boss in the early 1980s

== Entertainment ==
=== Film, television and theater ===
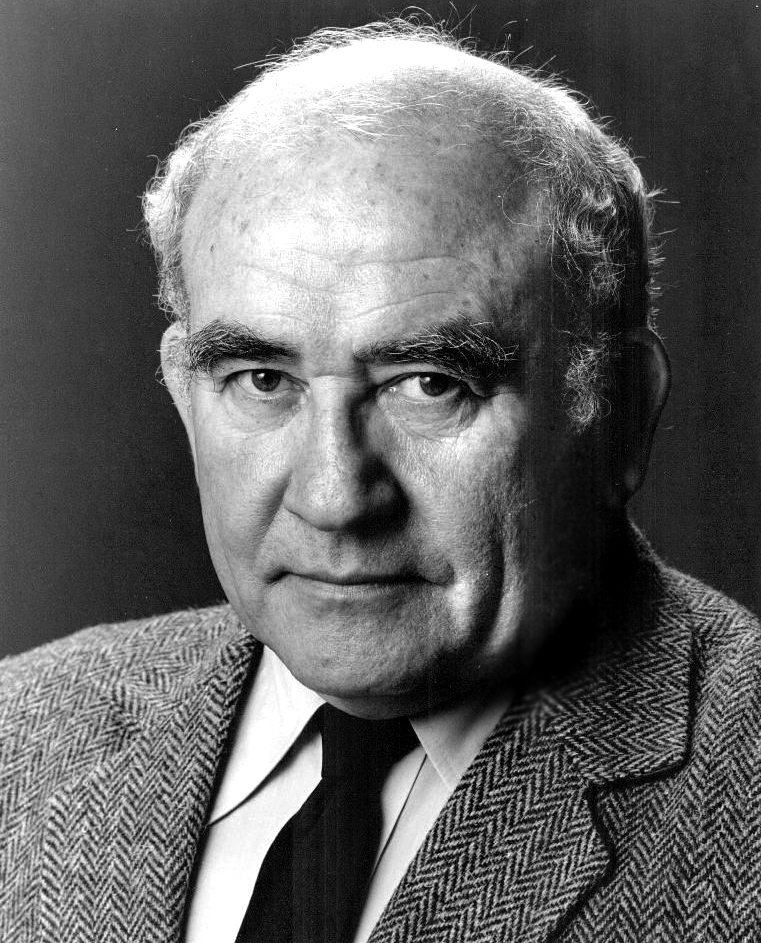
Emmy Award-winner Ed Asner

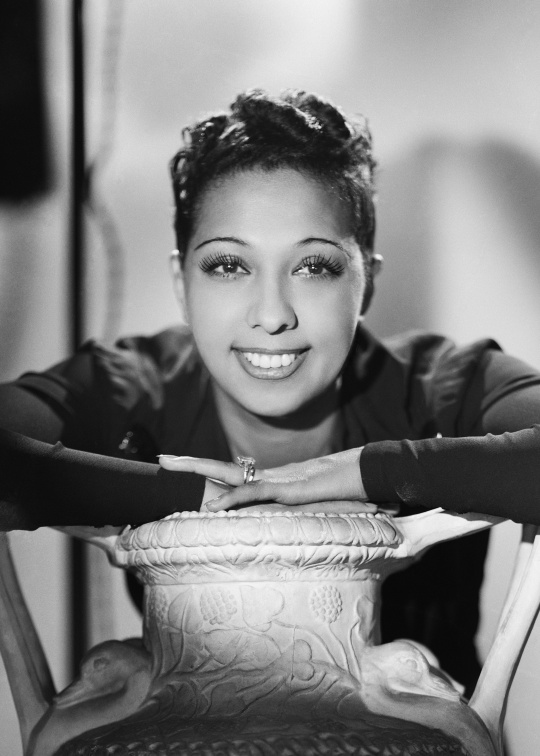
Josephine Baker

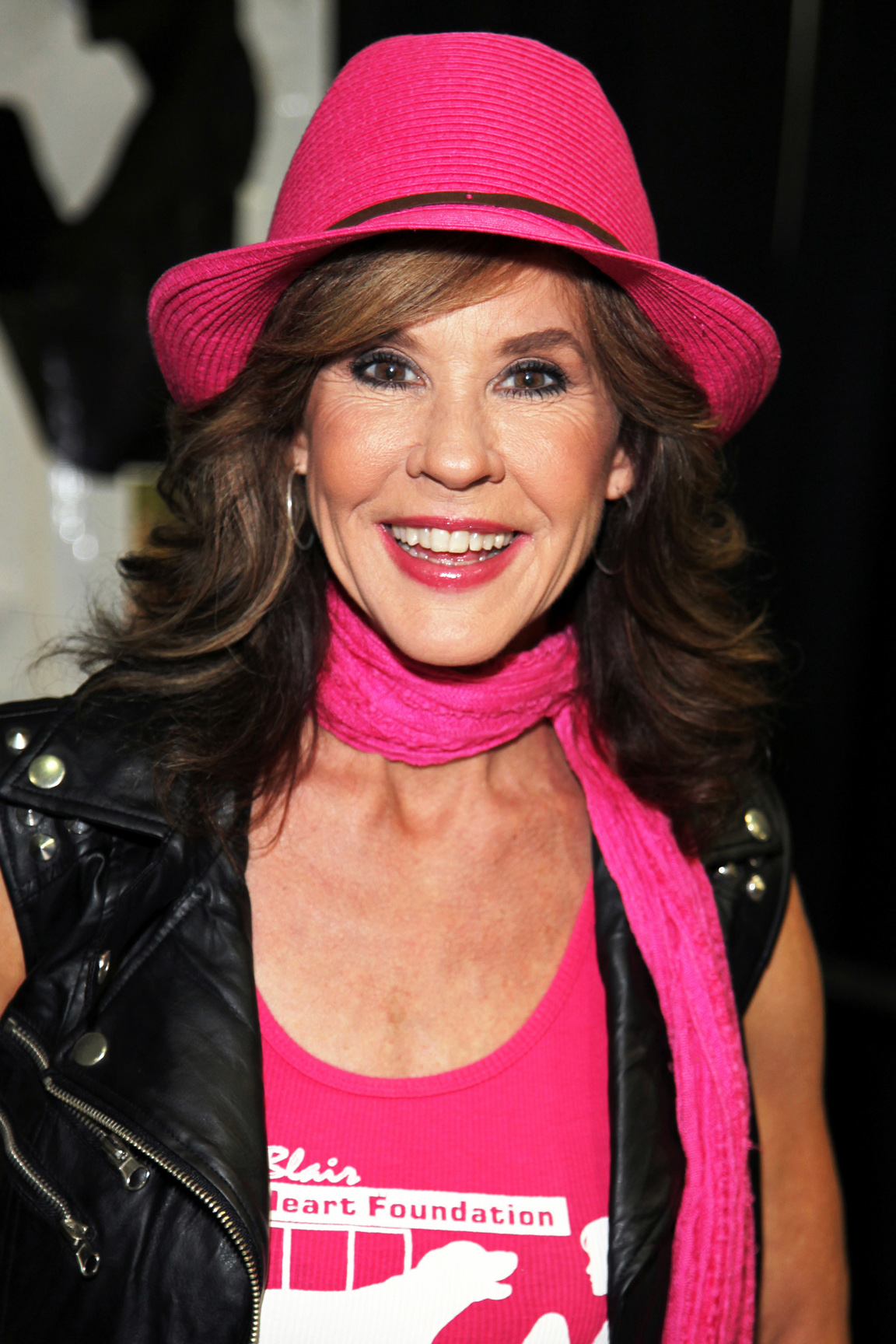
Linda Blair

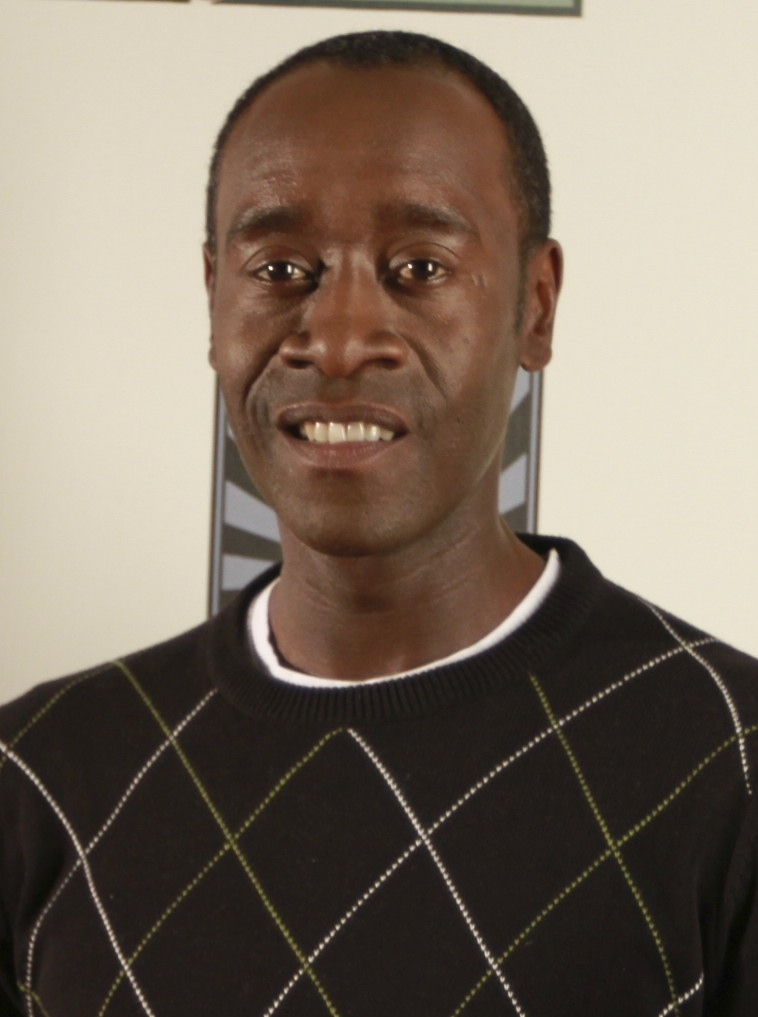
Don Cheadle

A–C

- Goodman Ace (1899–1982), television writer, radio host and comedian
- Jane Ace (1897–1974), radio actress and host
- Zoë Akins (1886–1958), Pulitzer Prize-winning playwright, poet
- Robert Altman (1925–2006), film director, M*A*S*H, Nashville, Gosford Park
- Ed Asner (1929–2021), Emmy Award-winning actor, The Mary Tyler Moore Show, Lou Grant; Up, Elf
- Josephine Baker (1906–1975), dancer, singer, actress
- Scott Bakula (born 1954), actor, Quantum Leap, Star Trek: Enterprise, NCIS: New Orleans
- Tisha Terrasini Banker (born 1973), actress
- Ryan Michelle Bathe (born 1976), actress, Boston Legal, Army Wives, Retired at 35
- Anne Bauchens (1882–1967), Oscar-winning film editor
- John Beal (1909–1997), actor, Les Misérables, Alimony
- Gerry Becker (born 1951), actor
- Noah Beery (1882–1946), actor, The Mark of Zorro
- Wallace Beery (1885–1949), Oscar-winning actor, The Champ, Min and Bill, Viva Villa!
- Rob Benedict (born 1970), actor, Felicity, Head Case, Threshold
- Bob Bergen (born 1964), voice actor
- Fred Berry (1951–2003), actor, What's Happening!!
- Linda Blair (born 1959), actress, The Exorcist, Airport 1975
- Linda Bloodworth-Thomason, screenwriter, Designing Women, Evening Shade
- Matt Bomer (born 1977), actor, White Collar
- Johnny Yong Bosch (born 1976), singer, Eyeshine; actor, Trigun, Power Rangers
- Jeff Branson (born 1977), actor
- Diane Brewster (1931–1991), actress
- Brent Briscoe (born 1961), actor, Yes Man, National Treasure: Book of Secrets, Spider-Man 2
- Kent Broadhurst (born 1940), actor
- Edgar Buchanan (1903–1979), actor, Petticoat Junction
- Norbert Leo Butz (born 1967), Tony Award-winning stage actor
- Christy Cabanne (1888–1950), director, Jane Eyre
- Jessica Capshaw (born 1976), actress, The Practice, Grey's Anatomy, 9-1-1: Nashville
- Morris Carnovsky (1897–1992), actor, Edge of Darkness, Dead Reckoning
- Don Cheadle (born 1964), actor, Hotel Rwanda, Traffic, Boogie Nights, Ocean's Eleven, The Rat Pack
- Marguerite Churchill (1910–2000), actress, The Big Trail, The Walking Dead
- Anthony Cistaro (born 1963), actor, Charmed, Witchblade
- Sarah Clarke (born 1972), actress, Nina Myers on 24
- Andy Cohen (born 1968), author, producer, and television personality, Watch What Happens Live
- Lynn Cohen (1933–2020), actress, Law & Order, Sex and the City
- Frank Converse (born 1938), actor, Movin' On, N.Y.P.D.
- Bert Convy (1933–1991), actor and TV personality, Semi-Tough
- Chris Cooper (born 1951), Oscar-winning actor, Lonesome Dove, The Bourne Identity, American Beauty, Breach
- Joan Crawford (1905–1977), Oscar-winning actress, Mildred Pierce, The Women, What Ever Happened to Baby Jane?
- Robert Cummings (1908–1990), actor, Kings Row, Saboteur, Love That Bob, Dial M for Murder

D–G

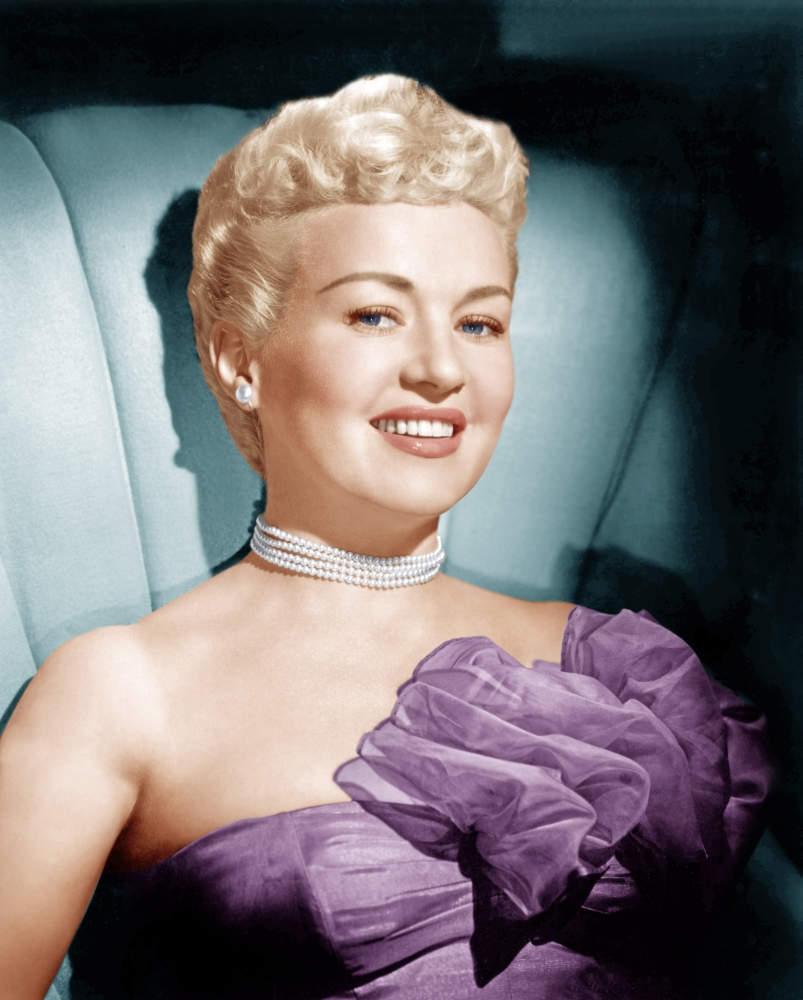
Betty Grable

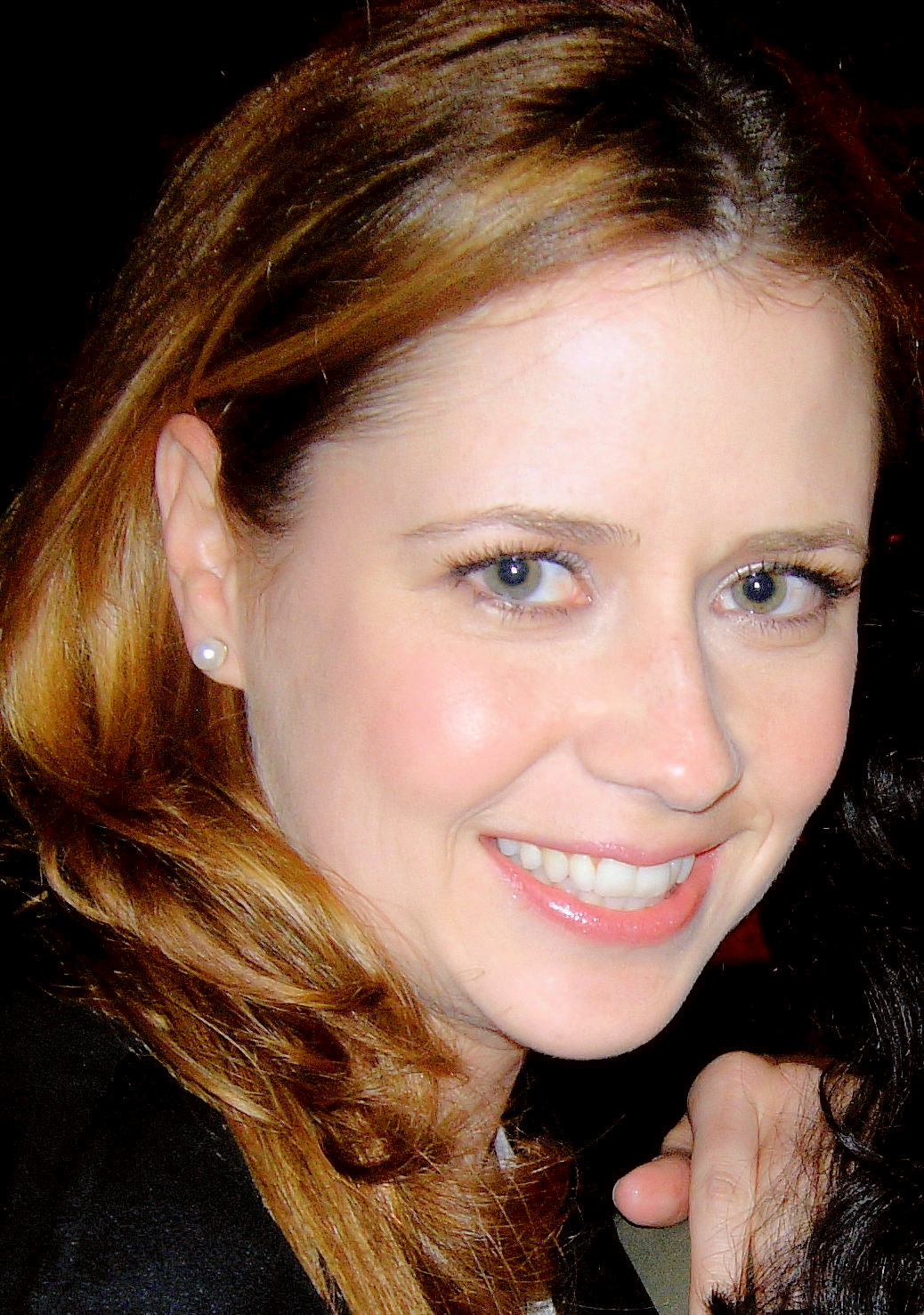
Jenna Fischer

- Erin Daniels (born 1973), actress, The L Word
- Nathan Darrow (born 1976), actor, House of Cards
- Don S. Davis (1942–2008), actor, Stargate SG-1, Twin Peaks
- Kurt Deutsch, actor, Models Inc.
- Walt Disney (1901–1966), iconic film and television producer, studio mogul, director, screenwriter, voice actor and animator
- Mary Alice Dwyer-Dobbin, television producer
- Dale Dye (born 1944), actor, Saving Private Ryan, Mission: Impossible, Band of Brothers
- Cliff Edwards (1895–1971), actor, musician; the voice of Jiminy Cricket
- Frank Faylen (1905–1985), actor, It's a Wonderful Life, Detective Story, Dobie Gillis
- Hala Finley (born 2009), actress
- Jenna Fischer (born 1974), actress, The Office, Hall Pass, Blades of Glory (born in Fort Wayne, Indiana, grew up in St. Louis)
- Henderson Forsythe (1917–2006), actor, As the World Turns
- James Franciscus (1934–1991), actor, Mr. Novak, Naked City, Marooned, Beneath the Planet of the Apes
- Phyllis Fraser (1915–2006), actress, journalist, children's book publisher, wife of Bennett Cerf and Robert F. Wagner Jr.
- Friz Freleng (1905–1995), film producer, director, screenwriter, and animator, Looney Tunes, Merrie Melodies
- Bob Gale (born 1951), screenwriter, the Back to the Future trilogy
- Betty Garrett (1919–2011), actress, On the Town, Take Me Out to the Ball Game, Laverne & Shirley
- Heather Goldenhersh (born 1973), actress, The Class, School of Rock
- John Goodman (born 1952), actor, Monsters, Inc., Roseanne, The Babe, Barton Fink, O Brother, Where Art Thou?, The Big Lebowski, The Conners
- Lucas Grabeel (born 1984), actor, High School Musical, Milk
- Betty Grable (1916–1973), actress, singer and World War II pin-up girl, Moon Over Miami, How to Marry a Millionaire
- Bryan Greenberg (born 1978), actor, musician, One Tree Hill, October Road, How to Make It in America
- Dabbs Greer (1917–2007), actor, Little House on the Prairie, Gunsmoke, The Green Mile
- Eddie Griffin (born 1968), actor, comedian, Undercover Brother, Norbit
- Davis Guggenheim (born 1963), director, producer
- Robert Guillaume (1927–2017), actor, Benson, Soap, The Lion King, Sports Night
- James Gunn (born 1970), film director and screenwriter
- Moses Gunn (1929–1993), actor, Father Murphy, The Cowboys, Shaft, Ragtime, Heartbreak Ridge
- Sean Gunn (born 1974), actor, Gilmore Girls, October Road, Guardians of the Galaxy

H–M

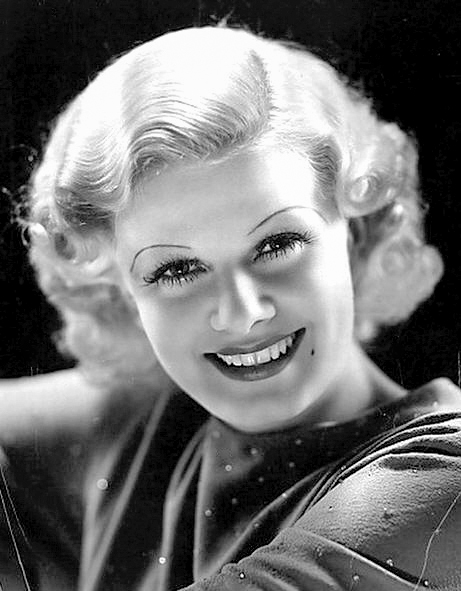
Jean Harlow

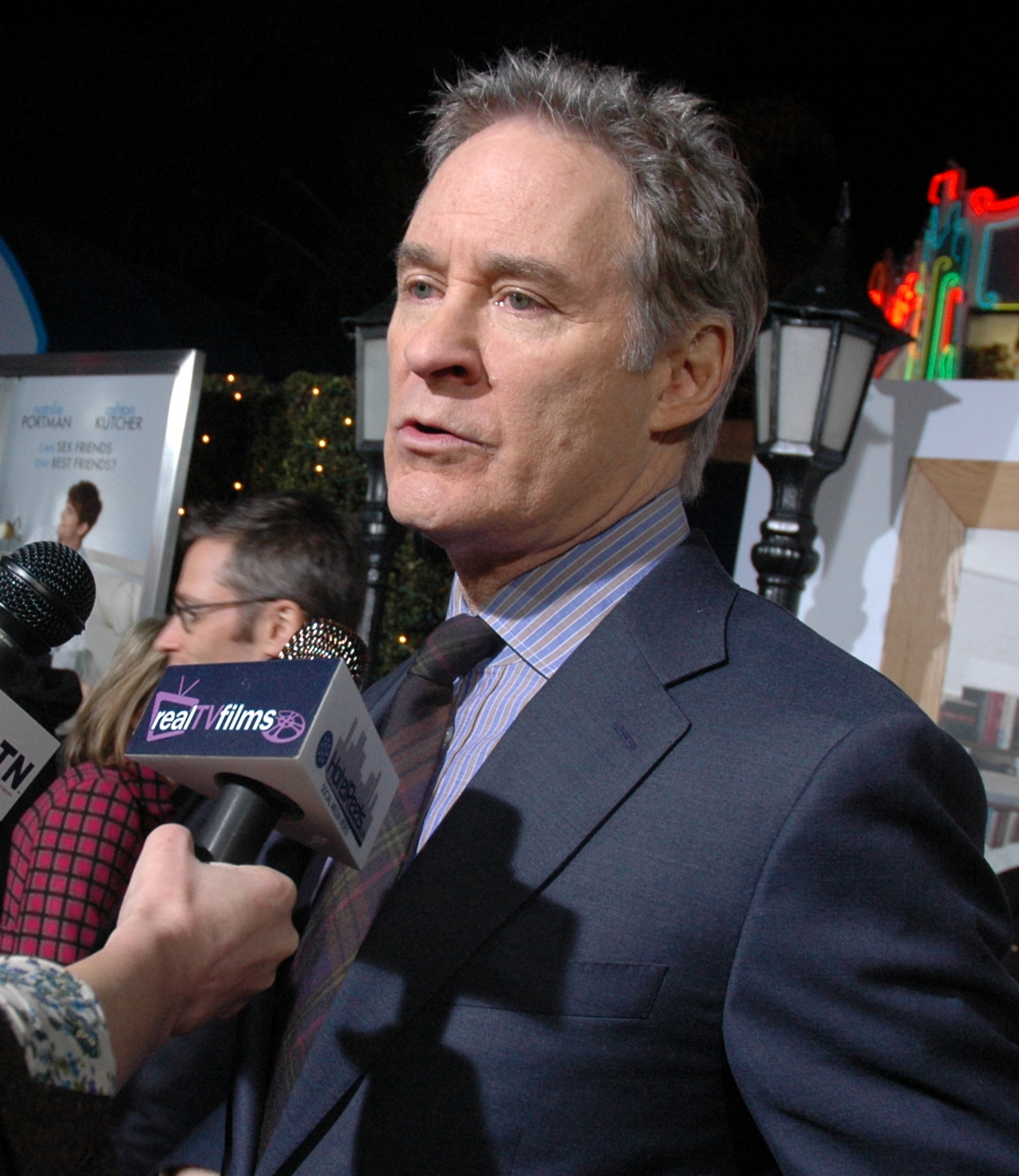
Kevin Kline

- Jon Hamm (born 1971), actor, Mad Men, The Town, Unbreakable Kimmy Schmidt, Baby Driver
- Jean Harlow (1911–1937), actress and sex symbol
- Tess Harper (born 1950), actress, Breaking Bad, No Country for Old Men, Crimes of the Heart
- George Hearn (born 1934), actor, primarily Broadway and musical theatre
- George Hickenlooper (1965–2010), documentary filmmaker, Hearts of Darkness, Dogtown
- Dennis Hopper (1936–2010), actor, filmmaker, artist, Easy Rider, Apocalypse Now, Speed, Hoosiers
- Arliss Howard (born 1954), actor, writer and director, Full Metal Jacket, Wilder Napalm, Moneyball
- Rupert Hughes (1872–1956), film director, composer; uncle of reclusive billionaire Howard Hughes
- John Huston (1906–1987), actor and Oscar-winning film director, The Maltese Falcon, Key Largo, The African Queen
- Don Johnson (born 1949), actor, Miami Vice, Nash Bridges, Guilty as Sin, Tin Cup, Django Unchained
- Jay Johnson (born 1977), actor, The Young and the Restless, Scrubs
- Janet Jones (born 1961), actress, dancer, wife of hockey's Wayne Gretzky
- Neal Jones (born 1960), actor, Dirty Dancing, G.I. Jane
- Brenda Joyce (1917–2009), actress, Little Tokyo, U.S.A., Tarzan movies in the 1940s
- Andreas Katsulas (1946–2006), actor, Babylon 5, Star Trek: The Next Generation
- Ellie Kemper (born 1980), actress, The Office, Unbreakable Kimmy Schmidt
- Edward Kerr (born 1966), actor, seaQuest DSV, What I Like About You
- Lincoln Kilpatrick (1932–2004), actor
- Kevin Kline (born 1947), Oscar-winning actor, Sophie's Choice, The Big Chill, A Fish Called Wanda, Last Vegas
- Evalyn Knapp (1906–1981), actress, Perils of Pauline, In Old Santa Fe
- David Koechner (born 1962), actor and comedian, Saturday Night Live, Anchorman
- Laura La Plante (1904–1996), actress in silent films
- Kasi Lemmons (born 1961), actress and director, Eve's Bayou, Talk to Me
- Angela Lindvall (born 1979), actress
- Mark Linn-Baker (born 1954), actor, My Favorite Year, Larry Appleton on Perfect Strangers
- Robert Lowery (1913–1971), actor, Batman in 1940s serial
- Oliver T. Marsh (1892–1941), cinematographer
- Marsha Mason (born 1942), actress, Sibs, The Goodbye Girl, Only When I Laugh, Chapter Two, Frasier
- Michael Massee (1952–2016), actor, 24, Seven, The Crow
- Wendell Mayes (1919–1992), screenwriter, The Spirit of St. Louis, North to Alaska, Von Ryan's Express
- Virginia Mayo (1920–2005), actress, The Best Years of Our Lives, White Heat, The Secret Life of Walter Mitty
- Edie McClurg (born 1951), actress, Ferris Bueller's Day Off, 7th Heaven
- Frank McGrath (1903–1967), actor, Wagon Train
- Steve McQueen (1930–1980), actor, The Sand Pebbles, The Great Escape, The Towering Inferno, Bullitt
- John Milius (born 1944), screenwriter, director, producer, Red Dawn, The Hunt for Red October, Conan the Barbarian
- Wendy Moniz (born 1969), actress, The Guardian, Guiding Light, Nash Bridges, Betrayal
- Mircea Monroe, actress, model, Cellular, Episodes

N–Z

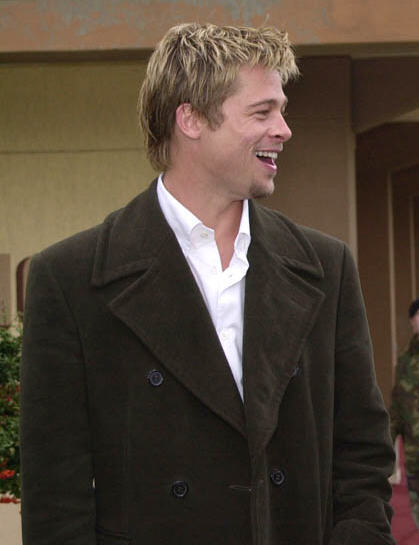
Brad Pitt

- Dustin Nguyen (born 1962), actor, 21 Jump Street, V.I.P.
- Kathleen Nolan (born 1933), actress, The Real McCoys
- Eva Novak (1898–1988), actress of the silent film era, The King of the Kitchen
- Jane Novak (1896–1990), actress of the silent film era, Treat'Em Rough, Redskin
- Dan O'Bannon (1946–2009), film director and screenwriter, Heavy Metal, Dark Star, Total Recall
- Denis O'Hare (born 1962), actor, Brothers & Sisters, Sweet Charity, True Blood
- Kevin O'Morrison (1916–2016), actor and playwright
- Timothy Omundson (born 1969), actor, Psych, Judging Amy
- Diana Ossana, screenwriter, Brokeback Mountain, Pretty Boy Floyd
- Geraldine Page (1924–1987), Oscar-winning actress, Summer and Smoke, Sweet Bird of Youth, The Trip to Bountiful
- Carlos PenaVega (born 1989), actor, singer, and dancer, Big Time Rush
- Evan Peters (born 1987), actor, American Horror Story, Invasion, Kick-Ass
- Julie Piekarski (born 1963), actress, The Facts of Life
- Brad Pitt (born 1963), actor and producer, Thelma & Louise, 12 Monkeys, Seven, Moneyball, World War Z
- William Powell (1892–1984), actor, The Thin Man, Life with Father, My Man Godfrey, Mister Roberts
- Vincent Price (1911–1993), actor, Laura, House of Wax, The Fly, The Ten Commandments, Edward Scissorhands
- Sally Rand (1904–1979), burlesque dancer, actress
- Doris Roberts (1925–2016), actress, Everybody Loves Raymond
- Leonard Roberts (born 1972), actor, Heroes, Buffy the Vampire Slayer
- Ginger Rogers (1911–1995), Oscar-winning actress, dance partner of Fred Astaire
- Paul Rudd (born 1969), actor, comedian, writer, and producer, I Love You, Man, Ant-Man
- Sol Smith Russell (1848–1902), 19th-century stage actor
- Jacqueline Scott (1931–2020), actress, Charley Varrick
- Martha Scott (1912–2003), actress, The Ten Commandments, Ben-Hur
- Sara Shane (1928–2022), actress, Magnificent Obsession, The King and Four Queens, Tarzan's Greatest Adventure
- Phyllis Smith (born 1951), actress, The Office
- Kelly Stables (born 1978), actress, The Exes, W.I.T.C.H., Two and a Half Men
- Craig Stevens (1918–2000), actor, State Trooper, Peter Gunn
- Christian Stolte (born 1962), actor, Prison Break
- Skyler Stone (born 1979), actor, Raising Hope, The Island
- Eric Stonestreet (born 1971), actor, Modern Family
- Betty Thomas (born 1948), actress and director, Hill Street Blues, The Brady Bunch Movie, Dr. Dolittle, Private Parts
- Kay Thompson (1909–1998), actress, Funny Face
- Sidney Toler (1874–1947), actor, Charlie Chan films
- William Traylor (1930–1989), actor, Fletch; founder of The Loft Studio/acting school
- Kathleen Turner (born 1954), actress, Body Heat, Romancing the Stone, Prizzi's Honor, Serial Mom
- Stephen Barker Turner (born 1968), actor
- Dick Van Dyke (born 1925), actor, The Dick Van Dyke Show, Mary Poppins, Diagnosis: Murder
- Jerry Van Dyke (1931–2018), actor, Coach, McLintock!, The Courtship of Eddie's Father
- Jack Wagner (born 1959), actor/singer, Melrose Place, General Hospital
- Virgil Ward (1911–2004), professional fisherman and host of Championship Fishing
- Ruth Warrick (1916–2005), actress, Citizen Kane, All My Children
- Dennis Weaver (1924–2006), actor, Gunsmoke, McCloud
- William White (1921–1985), actor, producer and director
- Mary Wickes (1910–1995), actress, White Christmas, Sister Act
- Dianne Wiest (born 1948), 2-time Oscar-winning actress
- Jason Wiles (born 1970), actor, Third Watch, Persons Unknown
- Mykelti Williamson (born 1960), actor, Forrest Gump, Fences
- Lanford Wilson (1937–2011), playwright, director, Lemon Sky, Redwood Curtain, Hallmark Hall of Fame
- Shelley Winters (1920–2006), 2-time Oscar-winning actress
- Jane Wyman (1917–2007), Oscar-winning actress; former wife of Ronald Reagan

=== Comedians ===
- Cedric the Entertainer (born 1964), actor, comedian
- Jo Firestone, actress, comedian, writer
- Redd Foxx (1922–1991), comedian, starred in Sanford and Son
- Dick Gregory (1932–2017), comedian, social activist
- Caleb Hearon (born 1995), actor, comedian
- Craig Kilborn (born 1962), comedian, actor, former talk show host
- Kathleen Madigan (born 1965), comedian
- Kevin Nealon (born 1953), actor, comedian
- Randy and Jason Sklar (born 1972), identical twin comedians, hosts of ESPN Classic's Cheap Seats
- Guy Torry (born 1969), actor, comedian
- Joe Torry (born 1965), actor, comedian

=== Cartoonists ===
- Ralph Barton (1891–1931), cartoonist
- George Booth (1926–2022), cartoonist for The New Yorker
- Lee Falk (1911–1999), cartoonist, The Phantom, Mandrake the Magician
- Al Hirschfeld (1903–2003), caricaturist and cartoonist known for drawing celebrities
- Fred Lasswell (1916–2001), cartoonist, Barney Google and Snuffy Smith
- Glenn McCoy (born 1965), cartoonist, The Duplex, The Flying McCoys
- George McManus (1884–1954), cartoonist, Maggie and Jiggs
- Mike Peters (born 1943), cartoonist, Mother Goose & Grimm
- Dan Piraro (born 1958), cartoonist, Bizarro
- Mort Walker (1923–2018), cartoonist, Beetle Bailey

=== Magicians and mentalists ===
- Morgan Strebler (born 1976), magician and mentalist; Las Vegas award-winning performer

=== Music ===
==== Bluegrass and country ====
- Lennie Aleshire (1890–1987), country-bluegrass pioneer and vaudeville act
- Connie Cato (born 1955), country music singer
- Shirley Collie Nelson (1931–2010), country music and rockabilly singer, yodeler, guitarist and songwriter
- Helen Cornelius (born 1941), country singer best known for duets with Jim Ed Brown
- Rusty Draper (1923–2003), country and rockabilly singer/guitarist
- The Duke of Paducah (1901–1986), Grand Ole Opry comedian and member of the Country Music Hall of Fame
- Sara Evans (born 1971), country music star
- Tyler Farr (born 1984), country music singer
- Narvel Felts (born 1938), country music singer
- Bob Ferguson (1927–2001), country music songwriter and producer
- Teea Goans (born 1980), country music singer
- John Hartford (1937–2001), country and bluegrass music composer and performer
- Jan Howard (1929–2020), country music singer and member of the Grand Ole Opry
- Ferlin Husky (1925–2011), singer and member of the Country Music Hall of Fame, former member of the Grand Ole Opry
- Brett James (born 1968), country music singer-songwriter and record producer
- Chris Janson (born 1986), country music singer-songwriter
- The Kendalls, Grammy-winning country duo from the 1970s and 1980s
- Walt Koken (born 1946), claw-hammer banjo player, fiddler, and singer
- Speck Rhodes (1915–2000), country music comedian and entertainer
- Tom Shapiro, country music songwriter and record producer
- Jack Shook (1910–1986), guitarist and a Grand Ole Opry star
- Tim Spencer (1908–1974), singer-songwriter, actor, member of the Original Sons of the Pioneers, member of the Country Music Hall of Fame
- Tate Stevens (born 1975), country music singer and 2012 winner of The X Factor
- Wynn Stewart (1934–1985), country music singer, progenitor of the Bakersfield sound
- Billy Swan (born 1942), country singer-songwriter
- Trent Tomlinson (born 1975), country singer-songwriter
- Leroy Van Dyke (born 1929), country singer best known for "The Auctioneer" and "Walk on By", former member of the Grand Ole Opry
- Darrin Vincent (born 1970), half of the Grammy-nominated bluegrass group Dailey & Vincent; record producer
- Rhonda Vincent (born 1962), bluegrass singer and musician, seven-time IMBA Female Vocalist of the Year
- Porter Wagoner (1927–2007), country music singer-songwriter; member of Grand Ole Opry and Country Music Hall of Fame
- Jerry Wallace (1928–2008), country and pop singer
- Dallas Wayne, Austin, Texas-based singer-songwriter, voice-over artist and on-air radio personality for Sirius Satellite Radio
- Speedy West (1923–2003), pedal steel guitarist and record producer
- Onie Wheeler (1921–1984), country and bluegrass musician
- Leona Williams (born 1943), country music singer
- Chely Wright (born 1970), country music singer and activist
- Billy Yates (born 1963), country music artist and songwriter
- Reggie Young (1936–2019), session musician

==== Jazz ====
- Oleta Adams (born 1953), soul, jazz and gospel singer
- Ahmad Alaadeen (1934–2010), jazz saxophonist and composer
- Norman Brown (born 1970), smooth jazz musician
- Jimmy Forrest (1920–1980), jazz tenor saxophonist
- Grant Green (1935–1979), jazz guitarist
- Coleman Hawkins (1904–1969), jazz tenor saxophonist
- Bob James (born 1939), smooth jazz musician
- Pat Metheny (born 1954), jazz guitarist and musician
- Oliver Nelson (1932–1975), jazz saxophonist, clarinetist, arranger, composer and bandleader
- Lennie Niehaus (1929–2020), alto saxophonist, arranger, and composer
- Charlie "Bird" Parker (1920–1955), jazz saxophonist and composer
- David Sanborn (born 1945), smooth jazz musician
- Wilbur Sweatman (1882–1961), Dixieland jazz and ragtime composer and bandleader
- Bob Brookmeyer (1929–2011), valve trombonist and composer
- Clark Terry (1920–2015), swing and bebop trumpet and flugelhorn player

==== Rhythm & blues, pop, rap and hip-hop ====
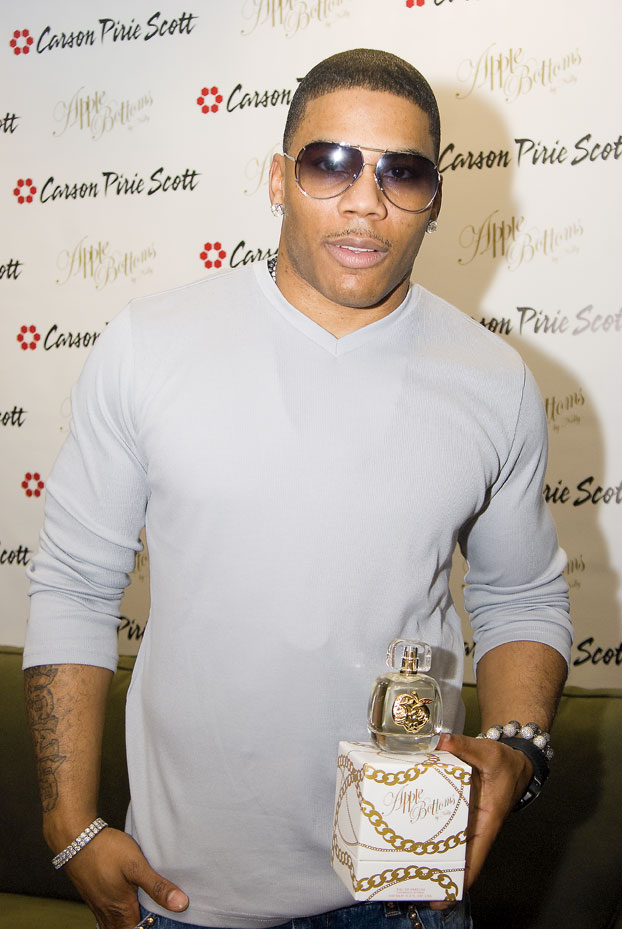
Nelly

- Akon (born 1977), rhythm and blues musician, music producer
- Fontella Bass (1940–2012), singer best known for 1965 hit Rescue Me
- Chingy (born 1980), rapper, actor
- Eminem (born 1972), rap musician (grew up partly in St. Joseph)
- Tech N9ne (born 1971), rapper
- Nelly (born 1974), rap musician (born in Texas and raised in St. Louis)
- David Peaston (1957–2012), R&B and gospel singer
- Ann Peebles, soul/R&B singer
- Sexyy Red (born 1998), rapper
- Chappell Roan (born 1998), singer-songwriter
- St. Lunatics, hip hop group, best known for collaborations with Nelly
- SZA (born 1989), singer-songwriter, born in St. Louis
- Kimberly Wyatt (born 1982), singer and dancer, Pussycat Dolls
- Slayyyter (born 1996), electropop singer-songwriter

==== Rock & roll ====
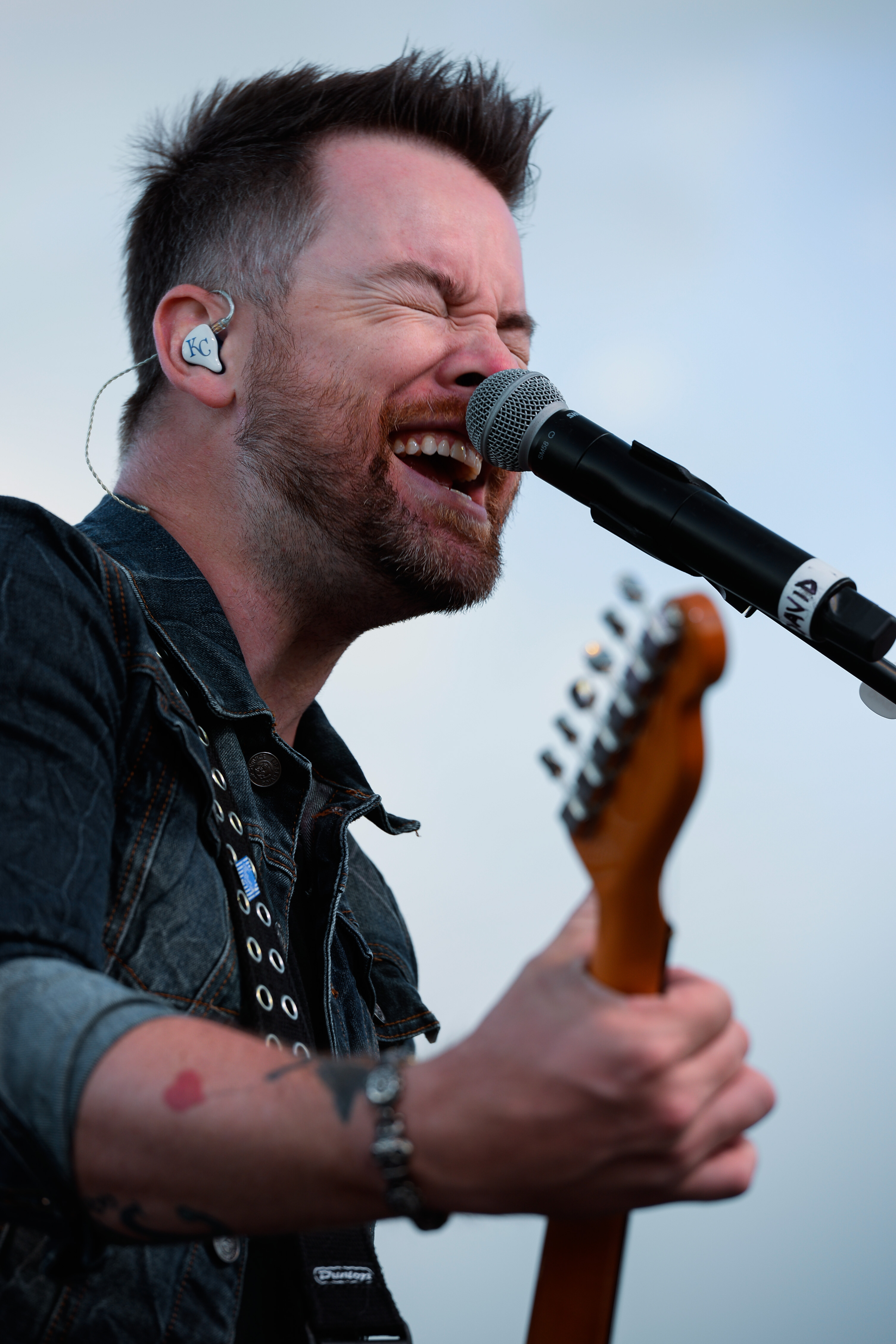
David Cook

- Chuck Berry (1926–2017), guitarist, musician, singer, songwriter, pioneer of rock & roll, in Rock & Roll Hall of Fame
- The Bottle Rockets (formed 1992), rock, alt-country, roots rock
- T Bone Burnett (born 1948), musician, songwriter, and soundtrack and record producer
- Cavo, hard rock band (formed in St. Louis)
- David Cook (born 1982), 2008 American Idol winner from Blue Springs
- Sheryl Crow (born 1962), Grammy-winning singer-songwriter
- Gravity Kills, industrial rock band, formed in Jefferson City
- Johnnie Johnson (1924–2005), early rock & roll and blues piano player; member of Rock & Roll Hall of Fame
- King's X, hard rock, progressive metal band, formed in Springfield
- Michael McDonald (born 1952), singer, former Doobie Brothers frontman
- Missouri, band known for classic rock song "Movin' On", formed in Kansas City
- Ozark Mountain Daredevils, rock band known for the hits "Jackie Blue" and "If You Wanna Get To Heaven", formed in Springfield
- Louise Post (born 1967), founder, lead singer and guitarist of alternative rock band Veruca Salt
- Puddle of Mudd, rock band, formed in Kansas City
- The Rainmakers, rock band, formed in Kansas City
- Jay Reatard (1980–2010), garage punk musician, born in Lilbourn
- Wes Scantlin (born 1972), lead singer and guitarist of post-grunge band Puddle of Mudd
- Shooting Star, 1970s and 1980s rock band, from Kansas City
- Story of the Year, emo rock band, formed in St. Louis
- The Urge, rock band, formed in St. Louis
- Bob Walkenhorst, founder and lead singer of alternative rock band The Rainmakers
- Steve Walsh (born 1951), lead vocalist, songwriter and keyboardist for the progressive rock group Kansas and Streets

==== Other music ====
- Doris Akers (1923–1995), gospel music singer and composer
- Martha Bass (1921–1998), gospel singer with Clara Ward Singers and solo career
- Burt Bacharach (1928–2023), pianist, composer
- Neal E. Boyd (1975–2018), opera vocalist, winner of 2008 America's Got Talent competition
- Grace Bumbry (1937–2023), opera soprano
- Sarah Caldwell (1924–2006), opera conductor
- Sara Groves (born 1972), Contemporary Christian singer, record producer, author
- Dan Landrum (born 1961), hammer dulcimer player, featured instrumentalist with Yanni
- Basil Poledouris (1945–2006), film soundtrack composer
- H. Owen Reed (1910–2014), composer and conductor
- Willie Mae Ford Smith (1904–1994), gospel singer
- Virgil Thomson (1896–1989), composer and critic
- Helen Traubel (1899–1972), opera vocalist

=== Radio and television ===
- Bob Barker (1923–2023), television game show host
- Jim Bohannon (born 1944), radio talk show host
- Rush Limbaugh (1951–2021), radio talk show host
- Dana Loesch (born 1978), radio talk show host and television host at TheBlaze
- Melanie Morgan (born 1956), radio personality with KSFO in San Francisco
- Erich "Mancow" Muller (born 1966), radio and TV personality, Mancow's Morning Madhouse
- Marlin Perkins (1905–1986), zoologist and host of Mutual of Omaha's Wild Kingdom
- April Scott (born 1979), model, Deal or No Deal and SOAPnet's Soap Talk
- Scott Shannon (born 1947), disc jockey for many radio stations across the country, hosted radio show America's Greatest Hits
- Chris Stigall (born 1977), talk radio personality for Philadelphia's WPHT

=== Beauty pageant titleholders ===
- Shandi Finnessey (born 1978), Miss USA 2004
- Debbye Turner (born 1965), Miss America 1990

== Journalism ==
- Jabari Asim (born 1962), author, journalist
- Bob Broeg (1918–2005), St. Louis sportswriter
- Joe Buck (born 1969), sportscaster for Fox Sports
- Harry Caray (1914–1998), Hall of Fame baseball broadcaster
- Walter Cronkite (1916–2009), television journalist
- Walker Evans (1903–1975), photojournalist best known for photos taken during the Great Depression
- Clay Felker (1925–2008), editor, journalist, founder of New York magazine
- Joe Garagiola (1926–2016), MLB catcher, baseball broadcaster, and television host (The Today Show)
- Dave Garroway (1913–1982), first host of NBC's Today show
- Jane Grant (1892–1972), journalist, co-founder of The New Yorker
- Michael Kim (born 1964), sports broadcaster for ESPN
- Carol Platt Liebau, attorney, political analyst and social conservative commentator
- Mary Margaret McBride (1899–1976), female radio pioneer
- Joe McGuff (1926–2006), Kansas City sportswriter
- Dan McLaughlin (born 1974), sportscaster for Fox Sports Midwest
- Russ Mitchell (born 1960), TV journalist, CBS Evening News
- Lisa Myers (born 1951), TV journalist, NBC Nightly News
- Stone Phillips (born 1954), TV journalist, Dateline NBC
- Joseph Pulitzer (1847–1911), Hungarian journalist, creator of the St. Louis Post-Dispatch and the Pulitzer Prize
- Howard Rushmore (1913–1958), journalist for The Daily Worker, New York Journal-American and Confidential magazine
- Elaine Viets, St. Louis columnist and author

== Military ==
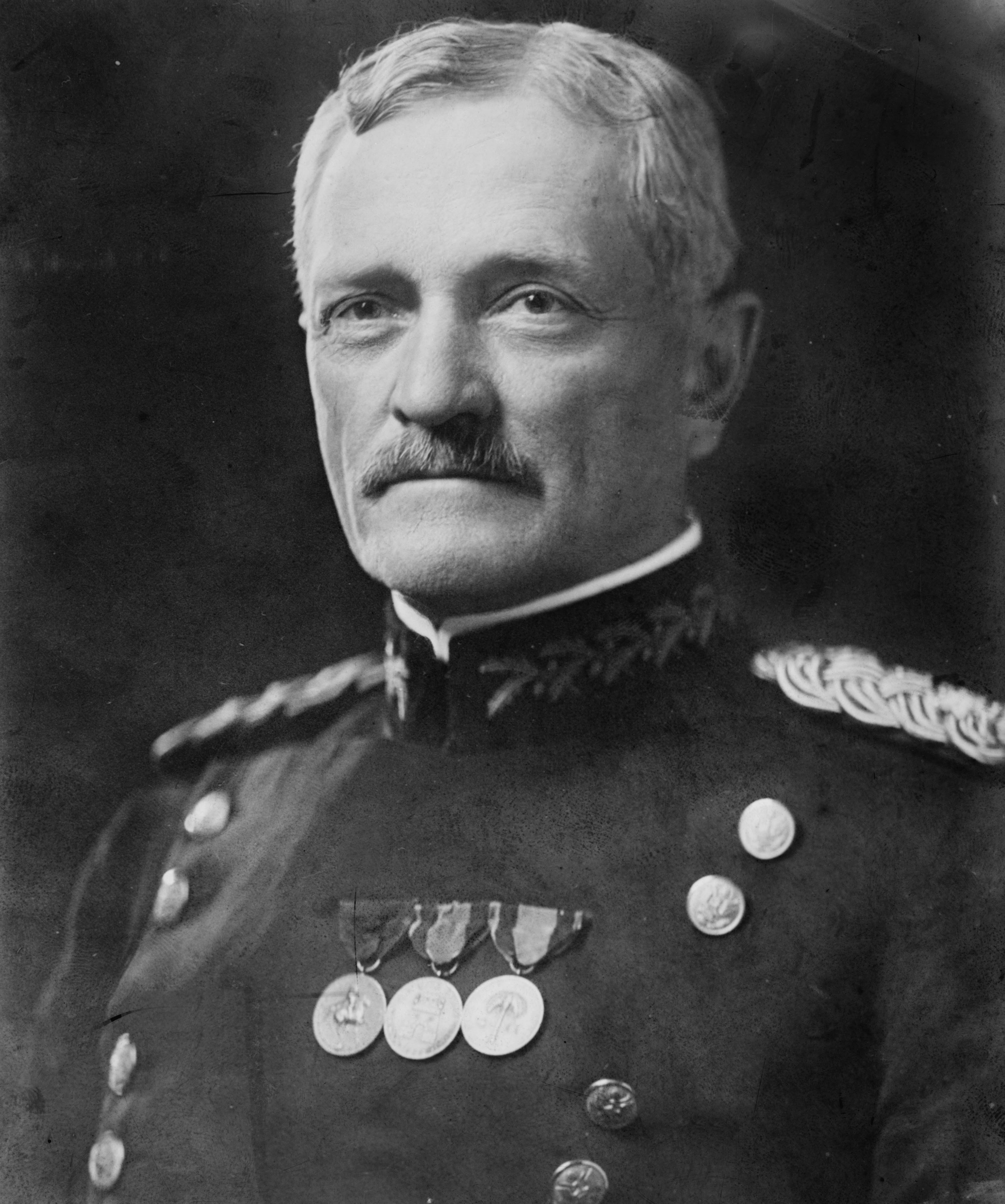
John J. Pershing

- William T. Anderson (1838–1864), a.k.a. "Bloody Bill" Anderson; Confederate guerrilla leader in the Civil War
- Charles D. Barger (1892–1936), earned the Medal of Honor in World War I
- John L. Barkley (1895–1966), earned the Medal of Honor in World War I
- Frederick Benteen (1834–1898), best known for the role under George Custer at the Battle of the Little Bighorn
- Omar Bradley (1893–1981), World War II general, from Clark, Missouri
- Robert Coontz (1864–1935), US Navy admiral, former chief of Naval Operations
- John V. Cox (born 1930), United States Marine Corps major general; flew over 200 combat missions during the Vietnam War
- Enoch Crowder (1859–1932), US Army general and reformer of the military justice system
- Randall "Duke" Cunningham, only U.S. Navy Ace in the Vietnam War; later a U.S. congressman from California
- James Phillip Fleming (born 1943), USAF pilot; awarded the Medal of Honor for actions during the Vietnam War
- John C. Frémont (1813–1890), Western explorer; Union Civil War general; first Republican candidate for U.S. President
- Frederick Dent Grant (1850–1912), U.S. Army major general and diplomat; son of U.S. President Ulysses S. Grant
- Martin E. Green (1815–1863), Confederate Army brigadier general; killed at Siege of Vicksburg
- John McNeil (1813–1891), Union Army brigadier general during the American Civil War; known as "The Butcher of Palmyra"
- Wayne E. Meyer (1926–2009), U.S. Navy rear admiral; "father of the Aegis weapons system"
- David Moore (1817–1893), Mexican–American War officer and Union Civil War brigadier general
- Edward O'Hare (1914–1943), "Butch" O'Hare, U.S. Navy Medal of Honor recipient, namesake of Chicago's O'Hare International Airport
- John Henry Parker (1866–1942), "Gatling Gun Parker"; a hero in the Spanish–American War; only U.S. soldier to be awarded the Distinguished Service Cross four times in World War I
- Floyd B. Parks (1911–1942), U.S. Marine aviator who earned the Navy Cross posthumously for his actions leading Marine fighter squadron VMF-221 during the Battle of Midway
- John J. Pershing (1860–1948), soldier, General of the Armies; born in Laclede, Missouri
- Sterling Price, Confederate States Army, general of the Missouri State Guard during the Civil War
- William Quantrill (1837–1865), Confederate guerrilla leader (Quantrill's Raiders) in the Civil War
- John H. Quick (1870–1922), U.S. Marine awarded the Medal of Honor in the Spanish–American War, awarded the Distinguished Service Cross and the Navy Cross in World War I
- James E. Rieger (1874–1951), colonel in Missouri National Guard; awarded Distinguished Service Cross and Croix de Guerre in World War I
- Roscoe Robinson (1928–1993), U.S. Army general
- Maxwell D. Taylor (1901–1987), U.S. Army general, chairman of the Joint Chiefs of Staff
- Stephen W. Thompson (1894–1977), first U.S. military pilot to ever shoot down an enemy in aerial combat (1918)
- Harry H. Vaughan (1893–1981), U.S. Army Reserve general, aide to the president of the United States 1945–1953
- George Allison Whiteman (1919–1941), first United States Army Air Corps pilot killed in World War II; awarded the Silver Star posthumously for after being shot down in the Japanese attack on Pearl Harbor
- Arthur L. Willard (1870–1935), United States Navy vice admiral, winner of Navy Cross, French Legion of Honour, and Belgian Order of Leopold; first man to plant the American flag on Cuban soil in the Spanish–American War

== Public office ==
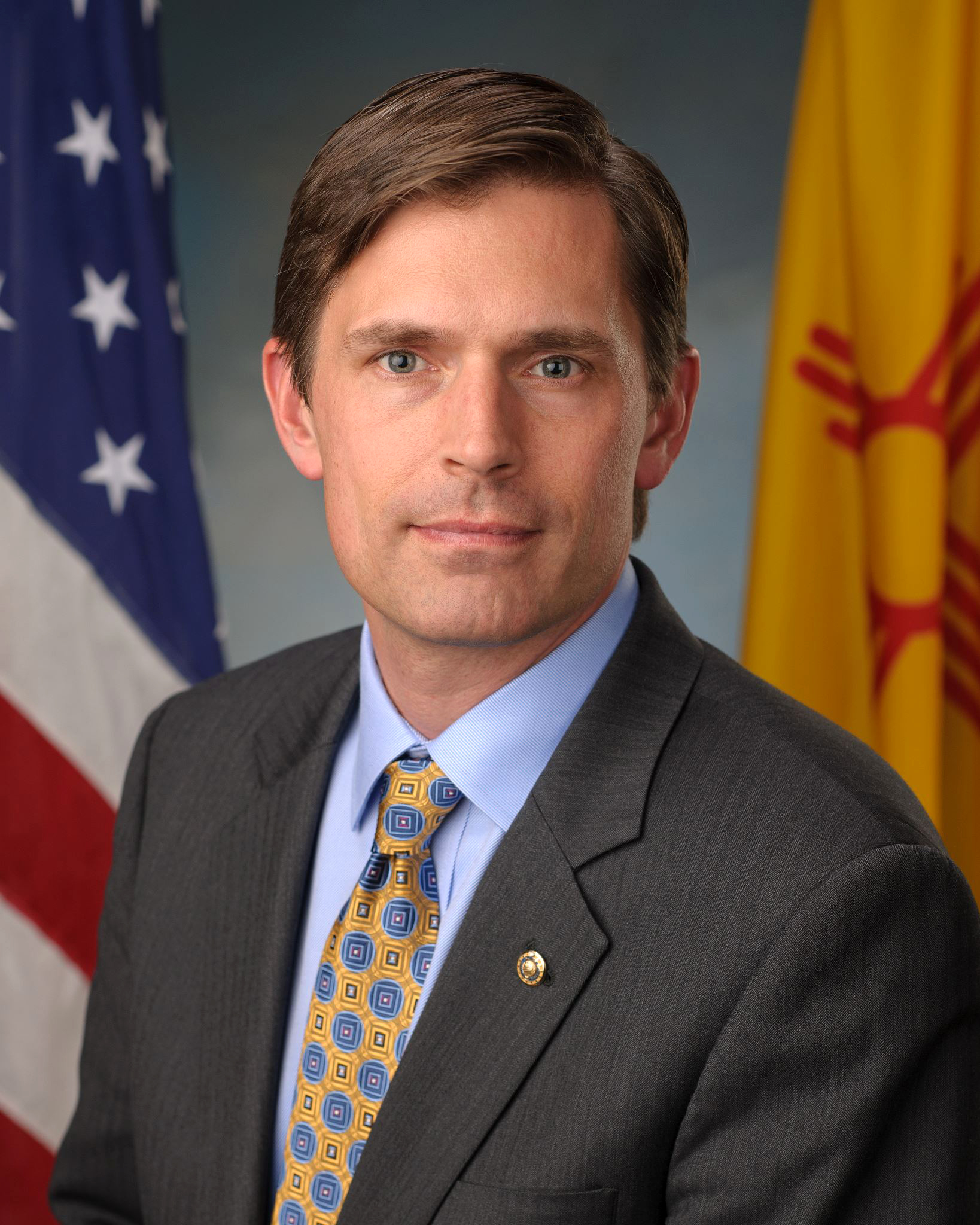
Martin Heinrich

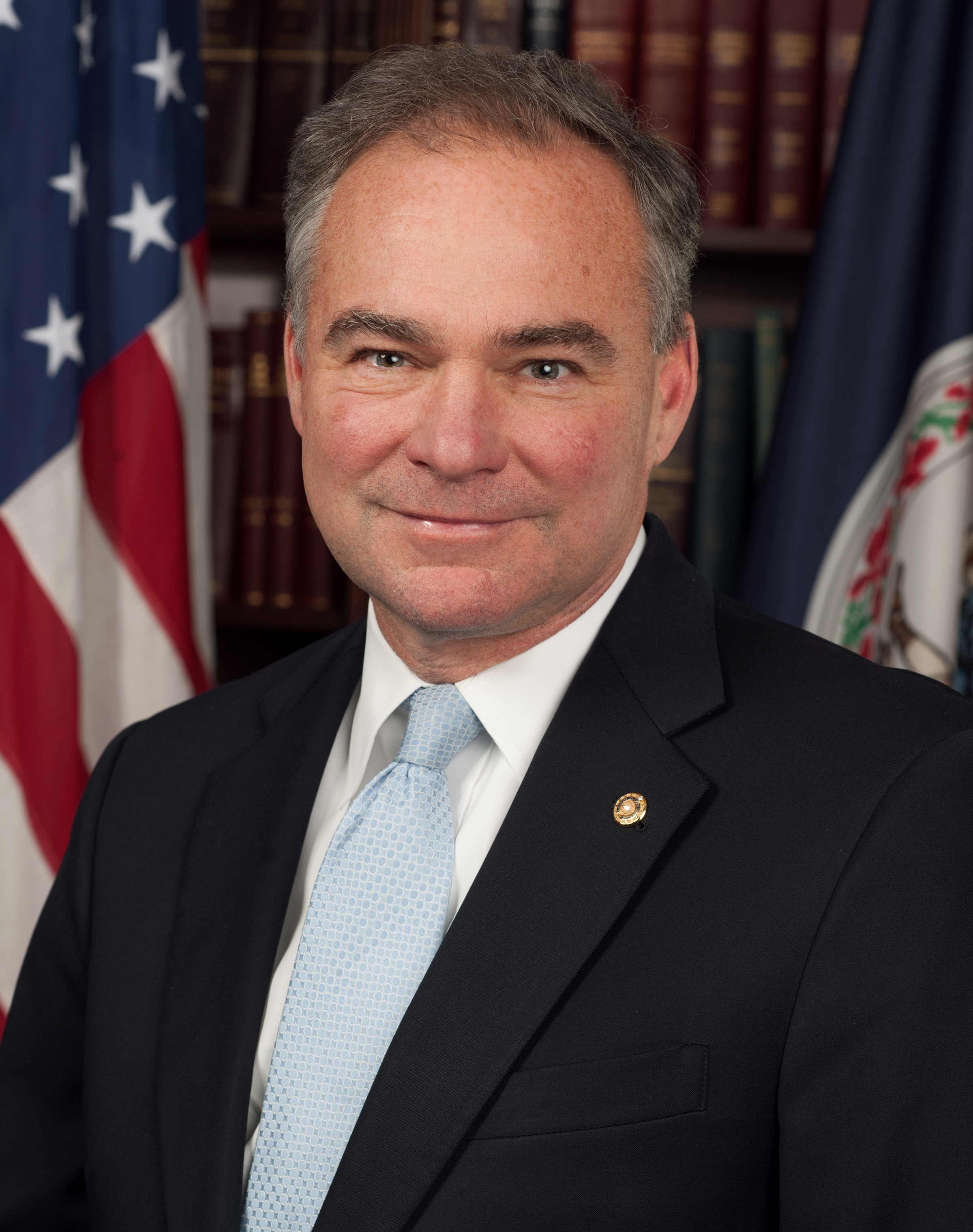
Tim Kaine

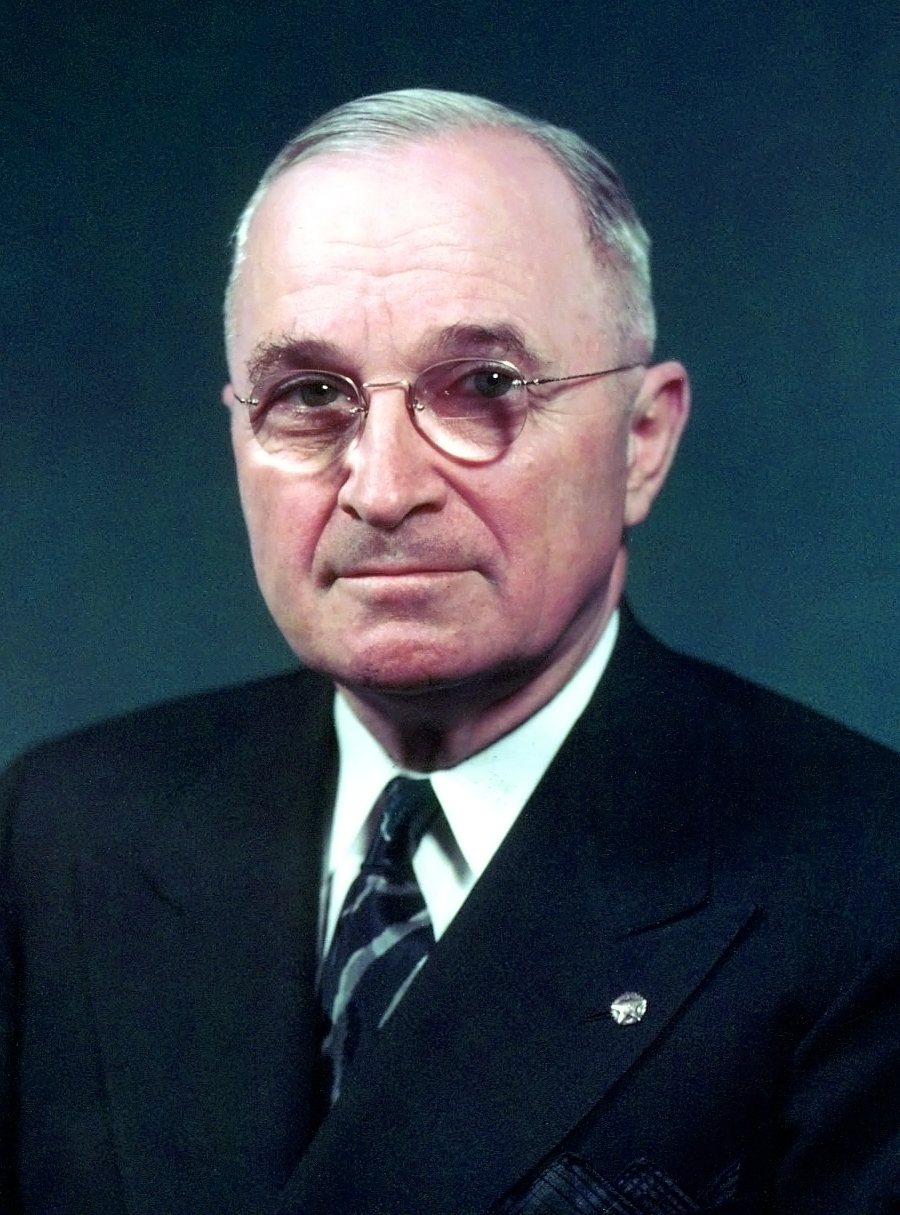
Harry S. Truman

A–K

- Orland K. Armstrong (1893–1987), U.S. representative, journalist and social activist
- John Ashcroft (born 1942), governor of Missouri (1985–1993), U.S. senator from Missouri (1995–2001), United States attorney general (2001–2005)
- Rex Barnett (born 1938), politician, and former officer of the Missouri State Highway Patrol
- Thomas Hart Benton (1782–1858), U.S. senator
- Richard P. Bland (1835–1899), U.S. representative for 23 years, Democratic candidate for U.S. president in 1896
- Roy Blunt (born 1950), seven-term U.S. representative for Missouri's 7th congressional district; House minority whip, U.S. senator
- Christopher S. "Kit" Bond (1939–2025), governor, U.S. senator of Missouri
- Leonard Boswell (1934–2018), U.S. representative for Iowa's 3rd congressional district
- Bill Bradley (born 1943), U.S. senator for New Jersey, NBA Hall of Famer; born and reared in Missouri
- Karilyn Brown (born c. 1947), member of the Arkansas House of Representatives for Pulaski County; born in Cape Girardeau
- Clarence Cannon (1879–1964), U.S. representative 1923–1964, House Appropriations Committee chairman
- Albert Sidney Johnson Carnahan (1897–1968), U.S. representative, US ambassador to Sierra Leone; father of Governor Mel Carnahan
- Jean Carnahan (1933–2024), first Missouri woman to become a U.S. senator, matriarch of Carnahan political family
- Mel Carnahan (1924–2000), governor, posthumous U.S. senator (died in plane crash three weeks before he was elected), patriarch of Carnahan political family
- Robin Carnahan (born 1961), Missouri secretary of state
- Russ Carnahan (born 1958), member of U.S. House of Representatives
- Francis M. Cockrell (1834–1915), U.S. senator and general in the Confederate States Army
- Steven Chu (born 1948), U.S. secretary of energy
- John Danforth (born 1936), U.S. senator and United States ambassador to the United Nations
- Thomas Eagleton (1929–2007), U.S. senator from Missouri (1968–1987); 1972 Democratic vice presidential nominee
- Josh Earnest (born 1977), White House press secretary to President Barack Obama
- David R. Francis (1850–1927), U.S. secretary of the interior (1896–1897), U.S. ambassador to Russia (1916–1917)
- J. William Fulbright (1905–1995), U.S. senator, established the Fulbright Fellowships
- Dick Gephardt (born 1941), U.S. representative from Missouri's 3rd congressional district (1977–2005); Democratic House majority leader (1989–1995); candidate for the Democratic nomination for president in the 2004 election
- Michael Gerson (born 1964), chief speechwriter for George W. Bush (2001–2006)
- Ulysses S. Grant (1822–1885), 18th president of the United States
- Bill Hardwick (born 1985), Missouri state representative
- Michael Harrington (1928–1989), founder of Democratic Socialists of America
- George Hearst (1820–1891), U.S. senator for California (1887–1891)
- Martin Heinrich (born 1971), former congressman and current U.S. senator from New Mexico
- Arthur M. Hyde (1877–1947), U.S. secretary of agriculture 1929–33, governor of Missouri 1921–25
- Alphonso Jackson (born 1945), 13th U.S. secretary of Housing and Urban Development
- James Jones (born 1943), U.S. National Security advisor under Barack Obama and retired USMC four-star general
- Tim Kaine (born 1958), former governor and current U.S. senator from Virginia since 2013; 2016 Democratic nominee for vice president under Hillary Clinton

L–Z

- Jerry Litton (1937–1976), two-term U.S. representative; Democratic nominee for U.S. Senate in 1976; killed in plane crash before general election
- Breckinridge Long (1881–1958), U.S. ambassador to Italy and assistant U.S. secretary of state under President Franklin D. Roosevelt
- Claire McCaskill, state auditor of Missouri (1999–2007); U.S. senator (2007–2019); first woman elected U.S. senator from Missouri
- James Benton Parsons (1911–1993), federal judge
- Clarke Reed (born 1928), Mississippi Republican state chairman, 1966 to 1976; instrumental in the nomination of Gerald R. Ford Jr. at the 1976 Republican National Convention; reared in Caruthersville, Missouri, and attended the University of Missouri
- Nellie Tayloe Ross (1876–1977), governor of Wyoming (1925–1927); director of the United States Mint (1933–1953); first woman to serve as a state governor
- Mel Sembler (born 1930), U.S. ambassador to Italy (2001–2005) and Australia (1989–1993)
- Jeanne Shaheen (born 1947), U.S. senator for New Hampshire
- Josh Shapiro (born 1973), 48th governor of Pennsylvania (2023–present); attorney general (2017–2023)
- Ike Skelton (1931–2013), U.S. congressman for the Missouri 4th District (1977–2011), chairman U.S. House Armed Services Committee
- Stuart Symington (1901–1988), first Air Force secretary and U.S. senator from Missouri
- Larry Thompson (born 1945), United States deputy attorney general under George W. Bush
- Harry S. Truman (1884–1972), vice president and 33rd president of the United States
- George Turner (1850–1932), U.S. senator and international arbitrator
- David King Udall (1851–1938), served in Arizona Legislature, progenitor of the Udall political family
- Harold Volkmer (1931–2011), 20-year member of U.S. Representative for northeast Missouri
- Jim Webb (born 1946), U.S. senator for Virginia and United States secretary of the Navy
- Pete Wilson (born 1933), mayor of San Diego, 36th governor of California, U.S. senator (1983–1991)
- Robert Coldwell Wood (1923–2005), secretary of Housing and Urban Development under Lyndon B. Johnson

== Science and medicine ==
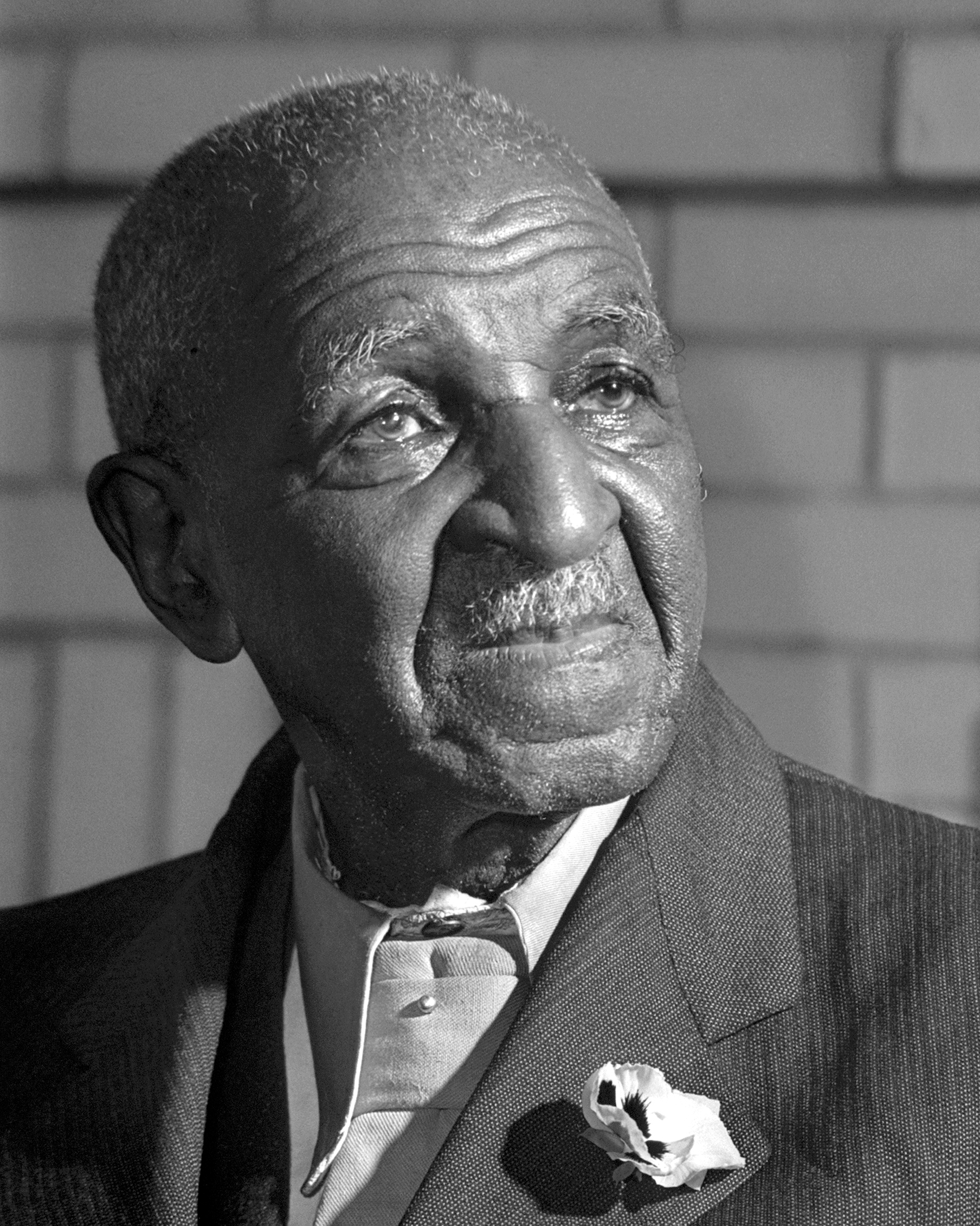
George Washington Carver

- Augie Auer (1940–2007), atmospheric scientist and meteorologist
- William F. Baker (born 1953), structural engineer
- Jean Bartik (1924–2011), early computer programmer and designer
- Gordon Bell (1934–2024), computer engineer and microcomputer pioneer
- Herbert Blumer (1900–1987), sociologist, developer of symbolic interactionism
- Martin Stanislaus Brennan (1845–1927), scientist and priest
- George Washington Carver (c. 1864–1943), botanist
- Steven Chu (born 1948), Nobel laureate in Physics, U.S. secretary of energy
- Robert H. Dicke (1916–1997), astronomer and physicist
- Charles Stark Draper (1901–1987), inventor
- David F. Duncan (born 1947), psychologist and epidemiologist
- James P. Eisenstein (born 1952), physicist
- Meta Given (1888–1981), home economist scientist, dietician, author
- Edward T. Hall (1914–2009), anthropologist and cross-cultural researcher
- Edwin Hubble (1889–1953), astronomer
- John Johnson (born 1977), astronomer and physicist
- Mark Johnson (born 1949), philosopher
- Virginia Eshelman Johnson (1925–2013), psychology researcher
- Jack Kilby (1923–2005), inventor of the integrated circuit, Nobel Prize winner
- Vitae Kite (1867–1940), entomologist
- Roger Kornberg (born 1947), biochemist, Nobel Prize winner
- Harry Laughlin (1880–1943), eugenicist
- J. C. R. Licklider (1915–1990), psychologist, computer scientist
- Pauline Gracia Beery Mack (1891–1974), chemist
- Ernest Manheim (1900–2002), sociologist
- William Howell Masters (1915–2001), gynecologist
- Orval Hobart Mowrer (1907–1982), psychologist
- Michael Rosbash (born 1944), Nobel Prize in Physiology or Medicine
- Keith Schwab (born 1968), physicist
- Richard Smalley (1943–2005), Nobel Prize-winning chemist, discovered buckminsterfullerene
- Harlow Shapley (1885–1972), astronomer
- William Jasper Spillman (1863–1931), plant geneticist, a founder of agricultural economics
- Lewis Stadler (1896–1954), aka L.J. Stadler, maize geneticist
- Andrew Taylor Still (1828–1917), physician and founder of osteopathic medicine
- Thomas H. Stix (1924–2001), plasma physicist
- Norbert Wiener (1894–1964), mathematician

== Miscellaneous famous Missourians ==
- William Becknell (1787–1856), soldier, businessman, founder of the Santa Fe Trail
- Johnny Behan (1844–1912), sheriff of Tombstone, Arizona, during the gunfight at the O.K. Corral
- Susan Blow (1843–1916), educator, "the mother of kindergarten"
- Sylvia Browne (1936–2013), author who claimed to be a medium and to have psychic abilities
- Nelle G. Burger (1869–1957), president for 34 years of the Missouri State Woman's Christian Temperance Union
- Calamity Jane (c. 1852–1903), Indian fighter and frontierswoman
- Alfred Caldwell (1903–1998), architect
- Dale Carnegie (1888–1955), public and motivational speaker
- Mike Caro (born 1944), professional poker player
- James E. Cofer (born 1949), president of Missouri State University, 2010–2011; professor of business at MSU
- Brad Daugherty (born 1951), professional poker player
- Moses Dickson (1824–1901), African-American abolitionist, soldier, minister, and founder of the secret organization the Knights of Liberty
- Matt Dillahunty (born 1969), public speaker, internet personality, atheist activist
- Timothy M. Dolan (born 1950), cardinal of the Roman Catholic Church and archbishop of New York
- Ella Ewing (1872–1913), "The Missouri Giantess", world's tallest woman (of her era)
- Hugh Ferriss (1889–1962), delineator and architect
- Julia Greeley (c. 1833–1918), ex-slave, Roman Catholic candidate for canonization
- Bobby Greenlease (1947–1953), kidnap-murder victim in case that drew national attention
- Phoebe Hearst (1842–1919), philanthropist, feminist and suffragist
- Raelynn Hillhouse, national security and intelligence community analyst, Cold War smuggler, spy novelist
- Helen Viola Jackson (1919–2020); last living wife of a Civil War Veteran
- Frances C. Jenkins (1826–1915), evangelist, Quaker minister, and social reformer
- Mary Ranken Jordan (1869–1962), philanthropist and community advocate
- Terry Karl (born 1947), professor of Latin American Studies at Stanford University
- Emmett Kelly (1898–1979), circus clown
- Karlie Kloss (born 1992), model and ballet dancer
- Alice Moyer Wing (1866–1937), writer and suffragist
- Carrie Nation (1846–1911), advocate for the temperance movement
- Rose O'Neill (1874–1944), author, illustrator, and creator of the Kewpie doll
- Walter J. Ong (1912–2003), Jesuit priest, cultural and religious historian and philosopher
- Homer G. Phillips (1880–1931), prominent lawyer and civil rights advocate
- Phyllis Schlafly (1924–2016), conservative political activist and author
- Dred Scott, slave and litigant in U.S. Supreme Court Dred Scott decision
- George Thampy (born 1987), Scripps National Spelling Bee champion 2000, staff member 2006
- Conrad Tillard (born 1964), politician, Baptist minister, radio host, author, and activist
- Faye Wattleton (born 1943), feminist activist
- Brian Wesbury (born 1958), economist
- Halbert White (1950–2012), economics professor at UC San Diego
- Roy Wilkins (1901–1981), civil rights activist
- Rodney Charles Wilson (born 1965), educator, LGBTQ advocate

== See also ==
- List of Hall of Famous Missourians inductees
- List of Missouri suffragists
- List of people from Columbia, Missouri
- List of people from Kansas City, Missouri
- List of people from Sedalia, Missouri
- List of people from Springfield, Missouri
- List of people from St. Joseph, Missouri
- List of people from St. Louis
- Lists of Americans
- Missouri Wall of Fame
