= List of people from Sedalia, Missouri =

The following is a list of people who were born in, have lived in, or are otherwise associated with American city of Sedalia, Missouri; they are known as Sedalians. In addition to what follows, a list of more than fifty Sedalia "Old Timers", who had met at the Sedalia Courthouse on the previous evening, was published in the December 12, 1893, issue of the Sedalia Bazoo; the list indicated when they had arrived in Sedalia, and from whence they had come.

== Arts ==
=== Acting ===
- Dorothy Dwan (1906–1981) – film actress
- Lucille McVey (1890–1925) – film screenwriter and silent film actress; married to Sidney Drew in 1914; often credited under married name of Mrs. Sidney Drew; through marriage, aunt to John, Lionel and Ethel Barrymore
- Jack Oakie, born Lewis Delaney Offield (1903–1978) – film, stage, radio, and television actor

=== Comedy ===
- Will Franken – comedian, satirist and actor

=== Literature ===
- Charles G. Finney – US Army veteran, novelist and author of The Circus of Dr. Lao among others, and copy editor of the Arizona Daily Star
- Joel Townsley Rogers (1896–1984) – short-story writer; mystery novelist (The Red Right Hand)
- June Rae Wood (born 1946) – children's and young adult's author

=== Music ===
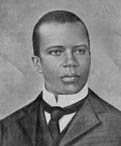
Scott Joplin

- Scott Hayden (1882–1915) – composer of ragtime music
- Scott Joplin (1868–1917) – musician and composer of ragtime music
- L. Viola Kinney (c.1890 – 1945) – composer, pianist, and music educator
- Arthur Marshall (1881–1968) – composer and performer of ragtime music
- Etilmon Justus Stark (1868–1962) – ragtime composer and arranger
- John Stillwell Stark (1841–1927) – piano dealer; publisher of ragtime music; promoter of Scott Joplin
- Leroy Van Dyke (born 1929) – country music performer; wrote "The Auctioneer" and recorded "Walk on By"; recorded over 500 songs
- Gene Watts – trombonist and co-founder of Canadian Brass

== Education ==
- Winona Cargile Alexander (1893–1984) – founder, Delta Sigma Theta sorority; high-school teacher; social worker

== Science and engineering ==
- Daniel C. Jackling (1869–1956) – mining and metallurgical engineer; founder, Utah Copper Company; known as "the father of open-pit mining"
- Walter Rautenstrauch (1880–1951) – mechanical engineer; first chairman of Columbia University's Department of Industrial Engineering; adviser to the Mexican Government; co-founder of Committee on Technocracy (1932)

== Historical figures ==
- Clay Allison (1840–1887) – gunfighter, American Old West

== Journalism ==
- Charles Grandison Finney (1905–1984) – journalist; writer; part-time night club owner; author, The Circus of Dr. Lao, which was adapted as the film 7 Faces of Dr. Lao (1964)
- Casper Salathiel Yost (1863–1941) – editor of St. Louis Globe-Democrat; founder of American Society of Newspaper Editors (1922)

== Medicine ==
- Walter Edward Dandy (1886–1946) – scientist and neurosurgeon

== Military ==
=== United States Army ===
- Richard D. Dean (1929–2016) – United States Army brigadier general and deputy director of the Army National Guard
- John Henry Parker – brigadier general, United States Army; West Point Graduate; war hero; first to recognize the tactical advantages of machine guns to continuously support advancing infantry and protect artillery trains (carriages pulled by draft animals); awarded the Distinguished Service Cross four times, for valor displayed on four separate occasions, during 1918

=== United States Air Force ===
- James Phillip Fleming (born 1943) – United States Air Force pilot in the Vietnam War; awarded Medal of Honor for bravery
- George Allison Whiteman – first USAF airman killed in World War II; killed when attempting to get his plane off the ground at Pearl Harbor on December 7, 1941; in 1955, Sedalia Air Force Base was renamed Whiteman Air Force Base in his honor

== Politics and government ==
=== Heads of state and heads of government ===
- Emmet Montgomery Reily (1866–1954) – journalist; politician; governor of Puerto Rico (1921–1923)
- Charles Emmett Yeater (1861–1943) – graduate of the University of Missouri; acting governor-general of the Philippines (March 5, 1921 – October 14, 1921)

=== Diplomats ===
- John Flournoy Montgomery (1878–1954) – United States ambassador to Hungary (1933–1941)

=== Politicians ===
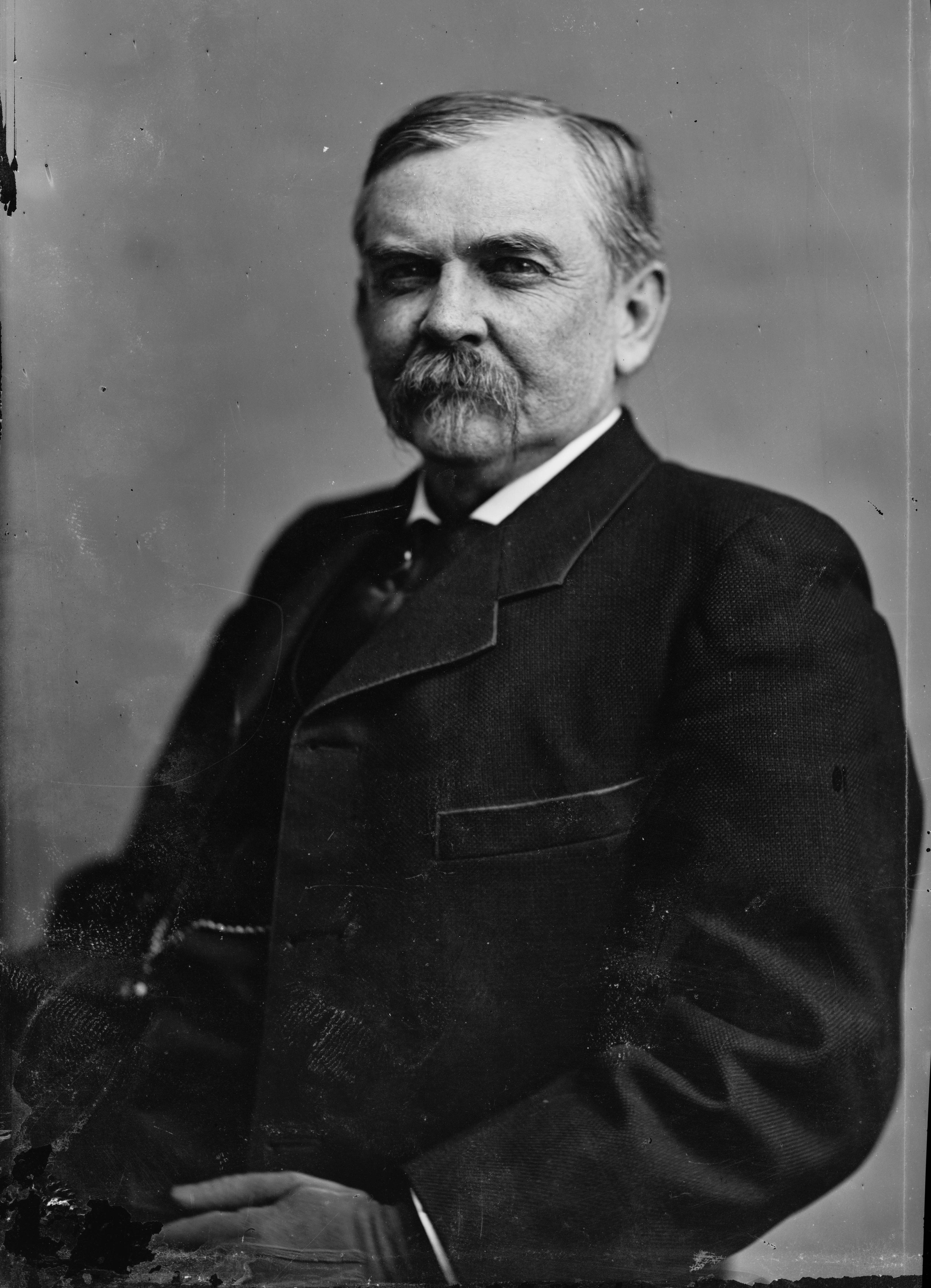
Senator George Graham Vest

- John Morgan Evans (1863–1946) – U.S. congressman (1913–1921; 1923–1933)
- Thomas Jefferson Halsey (1863–1951) – teacher; businessman; U.S. congressman (1929–1931)
- Judith K. Moriarty (born 1942) – politician; Missouri secretary of state (1993–1994)
- John William Palmer (1866–1958) – physician; lawyer; U.S. congressman (1929–1931)
- John Berchmans Sullivan (1897–1951) – lawyer; politician; U.S. congressman (1941–1943; 1945–1947; 1949–1951)
- George Graham Vest (1830–1904) – orator; lawyer; politician; at his death, the last living Confederate States senator; known for his "Eulogy on the Dog"
- Xenophon Pierce Wilfley (1871–1931) – teacher; lawyer; U.S. senator (1918); president, Missouri Bar Association (1925)

=== Judiciary ===
- Henry Lamm (1846–1926) – lawyer; jurist; poet; associate and chief justice of the Supreme Court of Missouri (1905–1916)
- John Finis Philips (1834–1919) – lawyer; politician; colonel 7th Missouri Volunteer Cavalry; president of Missouri Press Association (1891); US congressman; federal judge
- Donald J. Stohr (1934–2015) – United States District Court judge; born in Sedalia

=== Mayors of Sedalia ===
On February 15, 1864, the Missouri General Assembly passed a bill granting Sedalia a city charter. The charter appointed the first city officers, who served until elections were held in April 1864. The term of office for mayor was one year from 1864 to 1886, was two years from 1886 to 1938, and four- ears from 1938 to the present. City municipal elections are held in April.

The following have been mayors of Sedalia:

- 1864–1864 – George Rappeen Smith (R) (1804–1879): appointed
- 1864–1865 – James G. Tesch (R) (1831–1896)
- 1865–1865 – E. W. Washburn (R) (1814–1899): resigned
- 1865–1866 – F. L. Parker (R) (1834–1881)
- 1866–1867 – John Finis Philips (R) (1834–1919)
- 1867–1868 – Henry Suess (1837–1906)
- 1868–1869 – Bacon Montgomery (1840–1886)
- 1869–1870 – Albert Parker (1827–1895)
- 1870–1871 – William P. Jackson (1830–1891)
- 1871–1872 – Thomas J. Montgomery (D) (1812–1877)
- 1872–1873 – George W. Cummings (D) (1838–1922)
- 1873–1874 – R. T. Miller (D) (1831–1914)
- 1874–1875 – William H. H. Hill (D) (1840–1880)
- 1875–1876 – Norman Maltby (D) (1841–1876)
- 1876–1877 – David Blocher (D) (1838–1906)
- 1877–1878 – Logan Clark (D) (1820–1882)
- 1878–1880 – George L. Faulhaber (R) (1838–1926)
- 1880–1881 – E. C. Evans (D) (1828–1902)
- 1881–1882 – Frank Craycroft (D) (1841–1911)
- 1882–1884 – Charles E. Messerly (R) (1851–1938)
- 1884–1886 – John B. Rickman (D) (1840–1915)
- 1886–1888 – E. W. Stevens (D) (1846–1905)
- 1888–1890 – John D. Crawford (R) (1838–1908)
- 1890–1894 – E. W. Stevens (D) (1846–1905)
- 1894–1898 – Pleasant Dawson Hastain (R) (1853–1912)
- 1898–1900 – W. C. Overstreet (D) (1857–1916)
- 1900–1901 – Samuel K. Crawford (R) (1838–1901): died in office
- 1901–1906 – J. L. Babcock (R) (1861–1930)
- 1906–1908 – John A. Collins (I) (1834–1924)
- 1908–1910 – J. L. Babcock (R) (1861–1930)
- 1910–1912 – J. W. Mellor (D) (1860–1930)
- 1912–1914 – F. L. Ludemann (D) (1864–1941)
- 1914–1918 – J. L. Babcock (R) (1861–1930)
- 1918–1920 – A. L. Baumgartner (R) (1860–1933)
- 1920–1924 – Frank F. Hatton (D) (1866–1925)
- 1924–1928 – J. L. Babcock](R) (1861–1930)
- 1928–1930 – O. B. Poundstone (D) (1885–1971)
- 1930–1932 – Sidney B. Kennon (D) (1869–1938)
- 1932–1934 – Wilmer Steeples (R) (1891–1946)
- 1934–1935 – O. B. Poundstone (D) (1885–1971): resigned
- 1935–1942 – Julian H. Bagby (D) (1899–1990)
- 1942–1946 – Alonzo H. Wilks (R) (1876–1966)
- 1946–1950 – Julian H. Bagby (D) (1899–1990)
- 1950–1953 – Herbert E. Studer (R) (1918–1958): resigned
- 1954–1958 – Julian H. Bagby (D) 1899–1990)
- 1958–1962 – Abe Silverman (I) (1917–1999)
- 1962–1966 – L. L. Studer (R) (1888–1967)
- 1966–1970 – Ralph H. Walker (R) (1932–2009)
- 1970–1976 – Jerry N. Jones (R) (1937–2011): resigned
- 1976–1982 – Allen L. Hawkins (R)
- 1982–1988 – Larry G. Foster (R): resigned
- 1989–1991 – Steven J. Dust (NP): resigned
- 1991–2002 – Jane Gray (NP)
- 2002–2009 – Bob Wasson (NP) (1933–2009): died in office
- 2009–2014 – Elaine Horn (NP)
- 2014–2018 – Stephen Galliher (NP)
- 2018–present – John Kehde (NP)

== Sport ==
=== Baseball ===
- Bill Brown (1947-), play-by-play broadcaster for Cincinnati Reds and Houston Astros
- Allen Conkwright (1896–1991) – fourth cousin of Oakland Raiders' coach Red Conkright; pitcher with the Detroit Tigers in the 1920 season
- Bill Drake (1895–1977) – pitcher in various Negro league baseball teams (1914–1927)
- Al Orth (1872–1948) – pitcher who won 200 games while playing for the Philadelphia Phillies, Washington Senators and New York Highlanders (1895–1909)
- John Tillman "Bud" Thomas (1929–2015) – baseball player; infielder for the St. Louis Browns for the 1951 season
- Clarence LeRoy "Roy" Vaughn (1911–1937) – baseball player; pitcher for the Philadelphia Athletics for the 1934 season

=== Basketball ===
- Kim Anderson (born 1955) – basketball player and coach

=== Football ===
- Douglas Claydon Van Horn (born 1944) – football offensive lineman in the National Football League (1966–1979)
- Blake Grupe – kicker in the National Football League for the New Orleans Saints

=== Wrestling ===
- Douglas A. "Ox" Baker (1934–2014) – professional wrestler

== Miscellaneous ==
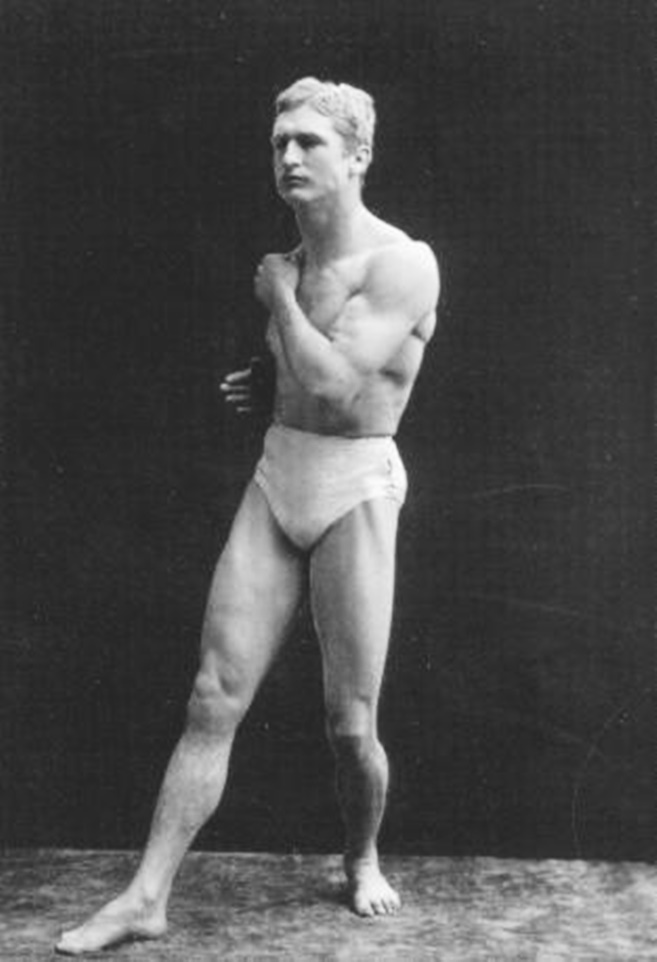
Bernarr Macfadden, "The Boxer", 1905

=== Physical culture ===
- Bernard Adolphus McFadden (later Macfadden) (1868–1955) – promoter of physical culture; advocate of fasting

=== Business ===
- E. Virgil Neal (1868–1949) – manufacturer, entrepreneur
- Fred Gurley (1889-1976) - president of Santa Fe Railroad, 1944-57, born in Sedalia

== See also ==
- List of people from Missouri
