= Gothic Western =

Contemporary subculture

Gothic Western (sometimes referred to as Western Gothic and Gothic prairie) is a subculture, artistically similar to Gothic Americana, but blends goth and Western lifestyles that are notably visible in fashion, music, film and literature.

== History ==
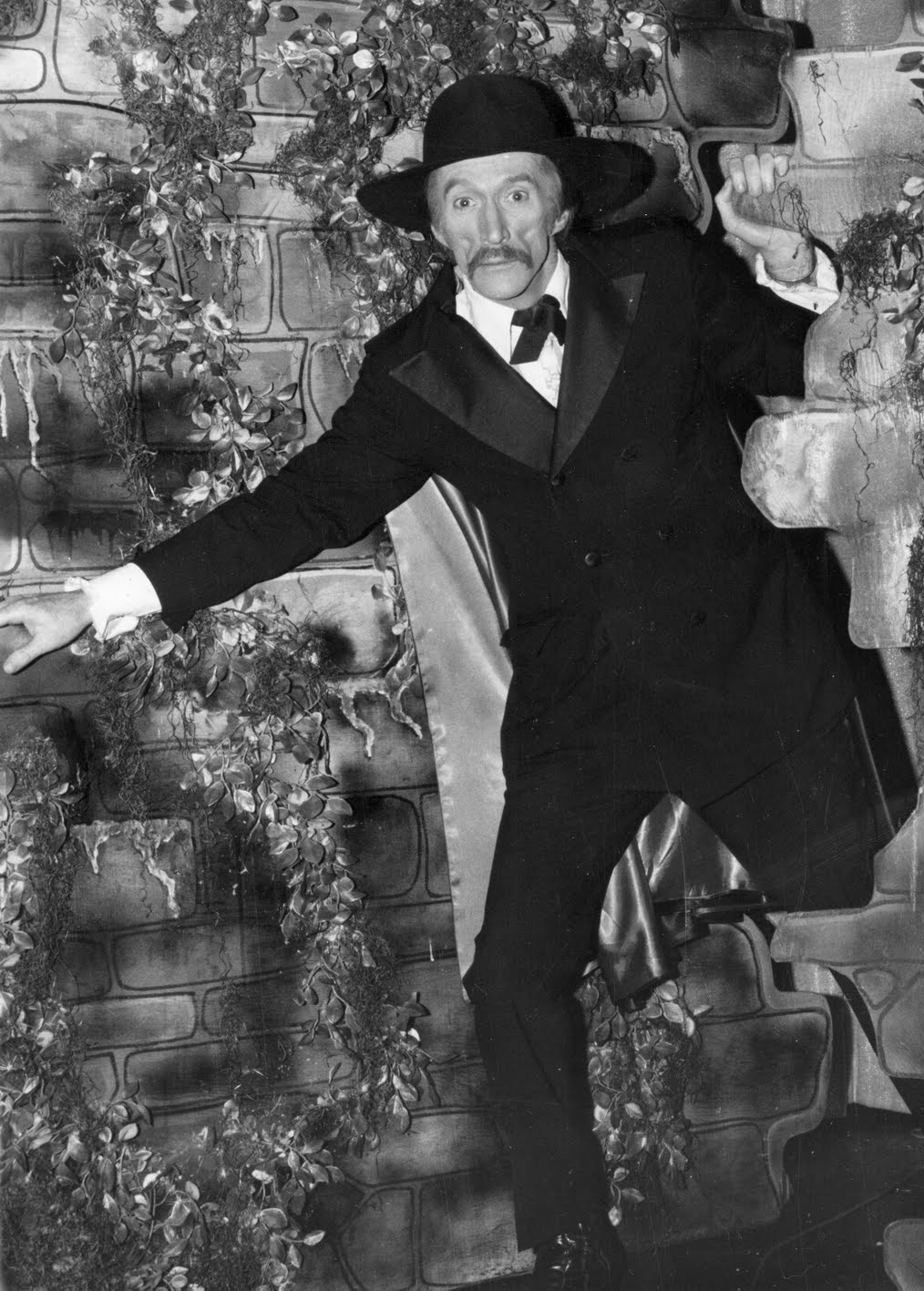
Sinister Seymour in 1973

The post-war consciousness between 1940 and 1950 left consumers wanting less monster-related horror in favor of dark storytelling connected with reality. In other words, the monster, subject to relativism, survives in the shadows of the idealized American Dream. Westerns were at their peak of popularity, but with the increase of technology, modernization and social changes, not without artistic commentary. An amalgamation of the two genres befitting this reflection was imminent. In 1971, Johnny Cash introduced the "Man in Black", stating:

"I wear the black for the poor and the beaten down, livin' in the hopeless, hungry side of town, I wear it for the prisoner who has long paid for his crime, but is there because he's a victim of the times."

Larry Vincent, a horror host named Sinister Seymour, established Knott's Halloween Haunt in 1973, one of the first Halloween related events on a large scale, blending Gothic and Western aesthetics at Calico ghost town, and providing a first venue for the growing subculture.

== Literature ==
In literature, the stereotype of the heroic cowboy gives way to a more complex antihero who has experienced trauma or is overcoming personal tragedy, and often associated to the darker side of Weird West monsters and villainy. The novel The Hawkline Monster: A Gothic Western by Richard Brautigan was one of the first to incorporate the term in its title, while Blood Meridian by Cormac McCarthy and The Dark Tower by Stephen King are also popular examples of the genre.

== Music ==
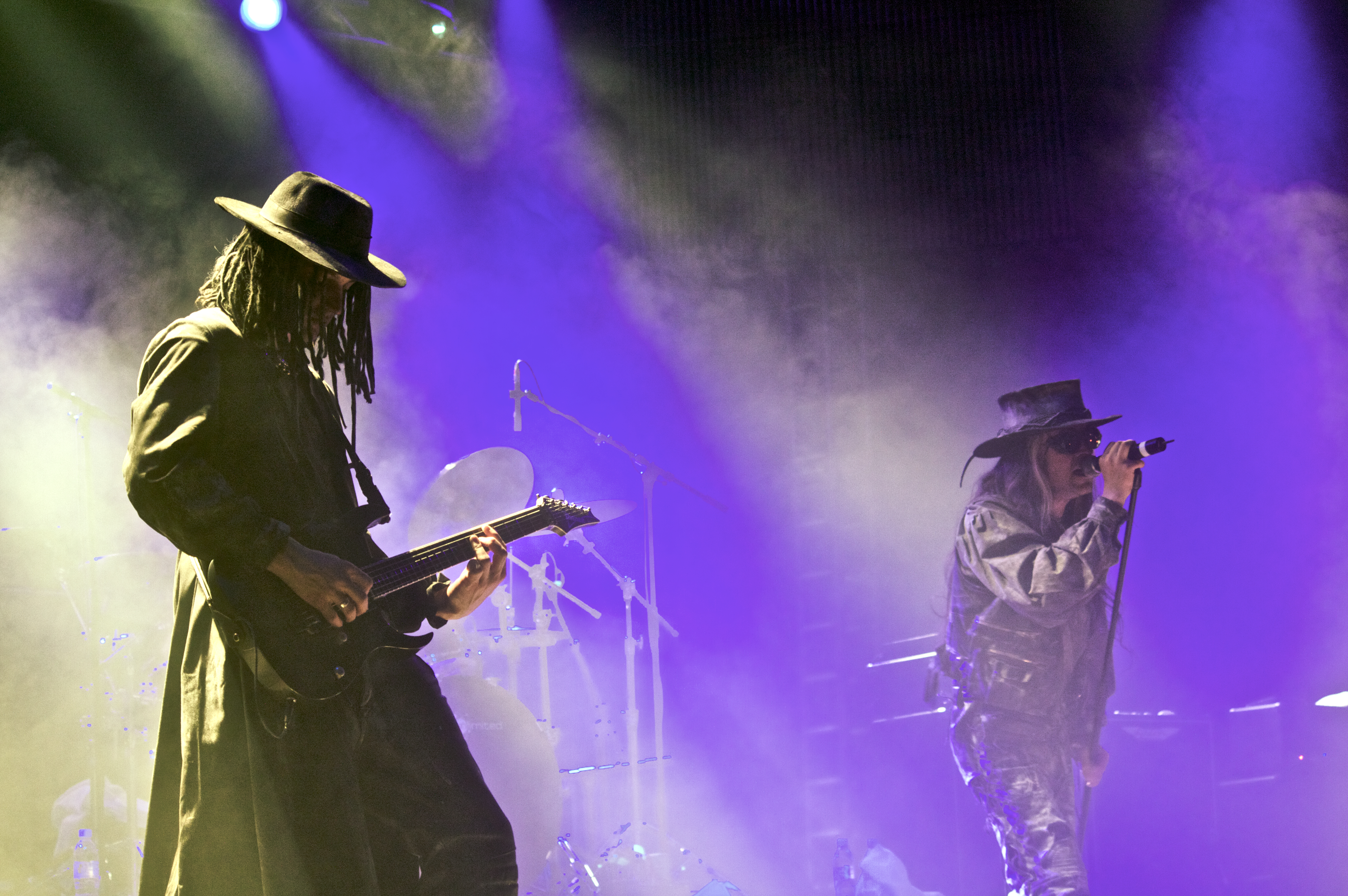
Fields of the Nephilim

The mixture of goth and Western music has brooding and dark motifs interwoven into cowboy culture while incorporating themes of death, occult and superstition. Crossover elements are seen in gothic country, but are unique to experiences of the American frontier, including Northern Mexico. The music encompasses storytelling and the cultural diversity of instrumentation associated with the American frontier. The spaghetti Western sound of Ennio Morricone is influential to the genre. Tom Waits, Johnny Cash, Steve Earle, The Handsome Family and Richard Marx have written Gothic Western songs.

== Film and television ==
Filmmaker John Carpenter spoke of the unique quality of the genre, noting it is not the same as a Western horror.

Curse of the Undead (1959) has been identified as the first Gothic Western film. Although it presented an innovative direction for both horror and Western films, American directors were slow to adopt this style; William Beaudine's 1966 films Billy the Kid Versus Dracula and Jesse James Meets Frankenstein's Daughter, although featuring Gothic elements, were closer to horror, and campier in tone. Instead, Italy's spaghetti Westerns would be more authentically Gothic, as features such as Django (1966), Django Kill... If You Live, Shoot! (1967), Vengeance (1968), Django the Bastard (1969), And God Said to Cain (1970), Keoma (1976) and Mannaja (1977) have been identified as Gothic Westerns, as have True History of the Kelly Gang (2019) and The Power of the Dog (2021). Gothic elements also appeared in Clint Eastwood's American Westerns High Plains Drifter (1973) and Pale Rider (1985).

In television, Penny Dreadful season three is considered an example of Gothic Western, with vampires invading the West.

== Gaming ==
Several games have been promoted as Gothic Western, including Darkwatch, West of Dead, Hunt: Showdown, and Evil West.

== Fashion ==
Gothic Western fashion is a mix of Western wear with goth or Victorian era mourning attire, incorporating black and leather elements.
