= Cal Bolder =

American film and television actor

- Bolder (left) with Robert Vaughn in One Spy Too Many, 1966
- Born: Earl C. Craver; June 14, 1931; Elkhart, Kansas, U.S.
- Died: January 19, 2005 (aged 73); Royal City, Washington, U.S.
- Occupations: Film and television actor
- Spouse: Billie Bolder
- Children: 4

Earl C. Craver (June 14, 1931 – January 19, 2005) was an American film and television actor. He was best known for playing Hank Tracy and Igor in the 1966 film Jesse James Meets Frankenstein's Daughter.

== Early life and career ==
Bolder was born in Elkhart, Kansas, the son of Fred Frances Craver and Mabel Mae. He attended Wichita State University on a football scholarship, and he served in the United States Marine Corps during the Korean War. For his military service, he received the Purple Heart. He was honorably discharged at the rank of corporal, and after his discharge, he worked as a police officer at the Los Angeles Police Department. He originally was a bodyguard, and he began his screen career in 1959, appearing in the CBS sitcom television series The Dennis O'Keefe Show.

Later in his career, Bolder guest-starred in television programs including Gunsmoke, Bonanza, The Man from U.N.C.L.E., Star Trek: The Original Series and Daniel Boone. In 1966, he starred as Hank Tracy and Igor in the film Jesse James Meets Frankenstein's Daughter, starring along with John Lupton, Narda Onyx, Estelita Rodriguez and Jim Davis. He also appeared in films such as Heller in Pink Tights and One Spy Too Many.

Bolder retired from acting in 1968, last appearing in the CBS western televisions series Cimarron Strip. After retiring from acting, he wrote the novel Last Reunion.

== Personal life and death ==
Bolder was married to Billie, and they had four children. Their marriage lasted until Bolder's death in 2005.

Bolder died of cancer on January 19, 2005, in Royal City, Washington, at the age of 73.
