= The Circus of Dr. Lao and Other Improbable Stories =

1956 anthology of fantasy stories

- cover of the first edition
- Author: edited by Ray Bradbury
- Language: English
- Genre: Fantasy
- Publisher: Bantam Books
- Publication date: 1956
- Publication place: United States
- Media type: Print (paperback)
- Pages: 210 pp

The Circus of Dr. Lao and Other Improbable Stories was an anthology of fantasy stories edited by Ray Bradbury and published in 1956. Many of the stories had originally appeared in various magazines including The New Yorker, Charm, Graham’s Lady’s and Gentleman’s Magazine, Harper's, and Unknown.

== Contents ==
- Introduction, by Ray Bradbury
- "The Circus of Dr. Lao", by Charles G. Finney
- "The Pond", by Nigel Kneale
- "The Hour of Letdown", by E. B. White
- "The Wish", by Roald Dahl
- "The Summer People", by Shirley Jackson
- "Earth’s Holocaust", by Nathaniel Hawthorne
- "Busby’s Petrified Woman", by Loren Eiseley
- "The Resting Place", by Oliver La Farge
- "Threshold", by Henry Kuttner
- "Greenface", by James H. Schmitz
- "The Limits of Walter Horton", by John S. Sharnik
- "The Man Who Vanished", by Robert M. Coates
