= Black Star (comics) =

Gothic horror comic book miniseries

- Cover to Black Star #1 by Martin Simmonds

Publication information
- Publisher: Titan Comics
- Schedule: Monthly (July 2026 - November 2026)
- Genre: Gothic horror western noir
- Publication date: July 2026
- No. of issues: 5
- Main character: Dashiell Carlyle

Creative team
- Written by: Kristin Kreuk; Peter Mooney; Eric Putzer
- Artist: Joe Bocardo

Black Star is a 2026 five-issue, creator-owned, monthly American historical Gothic horror western noir comic book miniseries. It is written by Kristin Kreuk, Peter Mooney, and Eric Putzer, illustrated by Joe Bocardo, edited by Jake Devine, and published by Titan Comics.

Described by its publisher as "a Northern Gothic Noir tinged with horror and dark humor", which combines elements from survivalist epics like The Revenant and magical quest stories such as Harry Potter and the Deathly Hallows: Part 1, the comic book is set in early 19th century Winnipeg, and follows a doctor named Dashiell Carlyle who, amidst skirmishes between two warring factions in the fur trade, discovers that he has magical abilities, and that a secret order of other magic users that recruits him wish to use their powers to remake the world into a utopia at the cost of many innocent lives.

The series, which marks the first comics work by actors Kreuk and Mooney, and screenwriter/producer Putzer, was officially announced on March 9, 2026. Its debut issue was released on July 29, 2026 to positive reviews.

== Publication history ==
Black Star was officially announced on March 9, 2026 as a collaboration between actress Kristin Kreuk, actor Peter Mooney, and writer/producer Eric Putzer. Kreuk explained the idea for Black Star originated when she, Peter Mooney and Eric Putzer worked together on the 2018–2021 Canadian legal drama Burden of Truth, relating, "We were inspired by the city/s lore and, because we worked so well together, began spending our spare time on set (and then, for years afterwards) developing our own take on the history and magic we imagined pulsing beneath its surface, shaping the rhythms of the city and the battles raging just beyond our view." Echoing this, Mooney described how the "eerie, snow-blanketed wasteland of early 19th Century Winnipeg" was conceived of for the story, stating, "Sometimes people come to my hometown and they can’t see past its rough edges or inhospitable weather. But it was clear Kristin and Eric could see right into the strangeness that makes Winnipeg so unique. This isn’t so much an alternative history, but an omitted chapter that's been lost to time. It's bizarre and fantastical and entirely imagined — but it goes a long way towards explaining why the city is how it is today." The story has been likened to a combination of the survivalist themes of The Revenant with the magical quest elements of Harry Potter and the Deathly Hallows: Part 1.

Touching upon their choice of setting, the creators call the story "a love letter to a frozen corner of the world that few know. It's weird. And wonderful. And something wholly its own." Regarding the story's themes, the creators stated that it explores morally gray issues, as Dashiell is forced, in the course of mastering his magical powers, to decide whether the utopia promised by the secret society he encounters is worth the price that he must pay for it, commenting, "It's a violent world: gritty, bloody, and dark. But that's balanced with a sense of discovery and awe."

Kreuk embarked upon the project, which the three creators spent years developing after the end of Burden of Proof, as part of the expansion of her career into writing and producing, and also to explore the mythology of Winnepeg, and highlight her Canadian heritage, and her home country's geography. She chose comics as the medium for the story, both to maintain ownership of the property, and for the freedom of it afforded in allowing the use of epic visuals that would not be bound by the budegtary or special effects limitations of onscreen productions. In a similar vein, Mooney, a Winnipeg native, saw the story as an opportunity to use the prism of fantasy to focus on his home's "strangeness" and "rough edges, describing the story as an “omitted chapter" of history that explains the city’s modern character.

The series' interior artwork and standard covers are provided by Joe Bocardo, with lettering by Dave Lentz. Colors are provided by Valentina Bianconi. Variant covers are illustrated by Martin Simmonds and Danny Luckert.

Upon the announcement of the series, Titan Comics released unlettered preview pages as a sample of look at the series’ tone and Joe Bocardo’s artwork, which depict Dashiell Carlyle during a violent fur trade battle amid the story's atmospheric 19th century snowscape, which is contrasted with the bloody melee. That May, Titan released a trailer for the miniseries that featuring animations of the artwork.

The series is intended for a mature audience of 17 years of age or older. Its first issue was published on July 29, 2026.

== Plot ==
In the early 1800s, Dashiell Carlyle is a doctor who moves to Winnepeg, a town known for brutal winters, amidst the violent fur trade wars between the Hudson’s Bay Company and the North West Company. Although he is a man of science, and skeptic who did not put much stock in myths or legends, upon healing a man wounded in a firefight by merely touching him, Dashiell discovers that he has magical healing powers. He is then recruited into a secret society of fellow magic users whose goal is to use their powers to manipulate historical events in order to create a "new and better world," but which may come at the cost of many lives, and significant moral sacrifices that the society feels is justified by the greater good, but which presents a moral dilemma for Dashiell.

== Critical reception ==
The series' debut issue garnered positive reviews, and holds an 8.2 out of 10 rating at the review aggregator Comic Book Round Up, based on four reviews.

Shaun Corley, reviewing the issue for Screen Rant, called it "the next great entry in the horror-western mashup genre", positively likening its blend of the supernatural and the western genre to that which was seen in horror western films such as the Ravenous (1999) and Bone Tomahawk (2015). Corley noted the story's rooting in the Winnipeg's occult history, singly out as an example the Pool of the Black Star, the chamber found in the Manitoba Legislative Building that is covered in occult symbols, and its unique acoustics, which Corley said gave the story a feeling of authenticity, and when combined with the book's elements of magic and murder, elevated the story. Corley viewed the story as an exploration of the theme that creating a utopia is impossible, and attempts to do tend to incur a great cost, an idea the series explores with a magical, fantasy-based approach, in contrast to previous iterations of the theme explored by properties like Star Trek and Watchmen.

Nicoln Drum, reviewing the issue for ComicBook.com, gave it a 3 out of 5, enjoying what she called an "intriguing premise", which she felt and the story's opening, which felt like a crime comic, but thought the large amount of narration made the issue somewhat tedious.

Al Mega, reviewing the issue for Comic Crusaders, gave the issue a 4.5 out of 5, lauding the story's world-building, the manner in which its mystery unfolded, and the tension created by the moral question posed by the story regarding the secret order's goal of creating a better world. Mega also praised the atmosphere conveyed by Joe Bocardo's artwork, and the way the colors by Valentina Bianconi properly effected emotional shifts throughout the narrative.

Kabooooom! critic Matt Morrison gave the issue a 5 out 5, writing, "Black Star is not the first comic written by a team including a prominent actor. It is, however, one of the few I’ve read that is honestly worth reading." Morrison opined that the writing was not of the amateurish quality seen in prior crossover attempts, as it lacked, for example, a thinly veiled character serving as a proxy for the actor/writer. Like other reviewers, Morrison enjoyed how the unique setting was derived from Canadian history, and also positively critiqued Bacardo's "moody, shadow-haunted artwork", while questioning whether his rendition of Dashiell Carlyle's resemblance to DC Comics' John Constantine was intentional. Morrison also said that Dave Lentz's lettering was "notably fantastic, with the square boxes and regular text of the narration contrasting with the traditional rounded word balloons with capital letters."

== Release schedule ==
Issue	Release date	ISBN
1	July 29, 2026	978-1806185962
2	August 26, 2026	65946001057100211
3	September 23, 2026	65946001057100311
4	October 21, 2026	65946001057100411
5	November 18, 2026	65946001057100521
