= The Magician Out of Manchuria =

1976 novel by Charles G. Finney

- Dust-jacket from the first edition
- Author: Charles G. Finney
- Illustrator: Richard Salvucci
- Cover artist: Richard Salvucci
- Language: English
- Genre: Fantasy novel
- Publisher: Panther Books
- Publication date: 1976
- Publication place: United States
- Media type: Print (Hardback)
- Pages: 129 pp
- ISBN: 0-937986-92-5
- OCLC: 21898553
- Dewey Decimal: 813/.52
- LC Class: PS3511.I64 M34 1989

The Magician Out of Manchuria is a fantasy novel by Charles G. Finney. It was first published by itself in 1976 by Panther Books and later in a limited edition of 600 copies from Donald M. Grant, Publisher, Inc. which were signed and numbered. The novel was previously included in an expanded edition of Finney's book The Unholy City in 1968.

== Plot introduction ==
The novel concerns the adventures of a hero who encounters a queen with remarkable talents.
