= Classic Game Room =

Video game review show

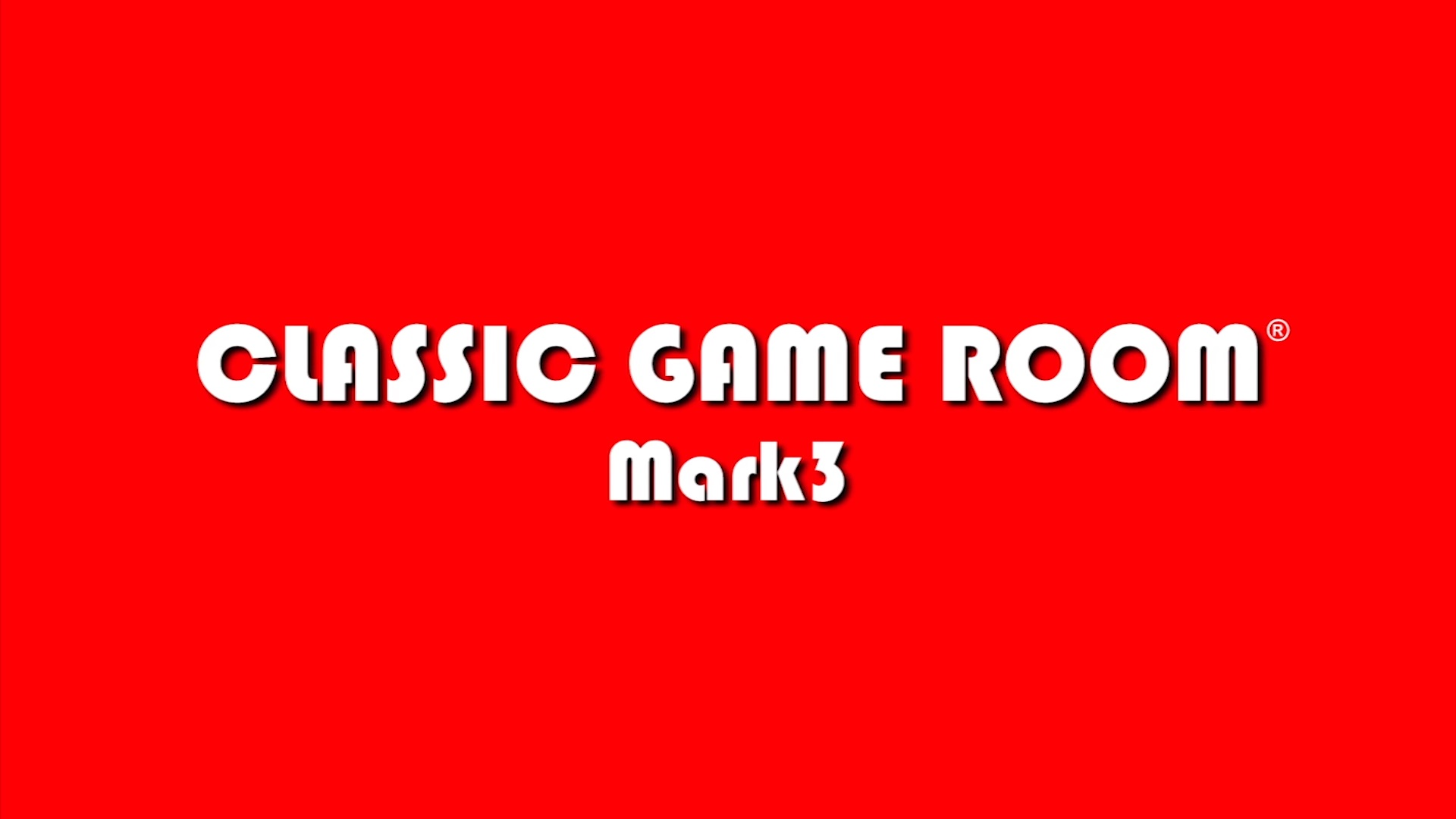
- The Classic Game Room Mark 3 title card (2016–2017)
- Genre: Video game review, sketch comedy
- Created by: Mark Bussler; David Crosson
- Directed by: Mark Bussler
- Starring: Mark Bussler (1999–2019, 2023–present); David Crosson (1999–2000)
- Theme music composer: Tom Myers
- Opening theme: "Flock of Cowboys"
- Country of origin: United States
- Original language: English
- No. of seasons: 16
- No. of episodes: 2,800

Production
- Producer: Mark Bussler
- Production location: Pittsburgh, Pennsylvania
- Editor: Mark Bussler
- Running time: Varies, usually 2–9 minutes per episode
- Production companies: Inecom, LLC

Original release
- Network: FromUSAlive
- Release: November 11, 1999 – October 23, 2000
- Network: YouTube
- Release: February 28, 2008 – January 19, 2018
- Network: Amazon Prime
- Release: March 2, 2018 – present
- Network: YouTube
- Release: December 31, 2018 – April 24, 2019
- Network: YouTube
- Release: June 28, 2023 – present

Classic Game Room (commonly abbreviated CGR) is a video game review web series produced, directed, edited and hosted by Mark Bussler of Inecom, LLC. The show reviewed both retro and modern video games along with gaming accessories, pinball machines, and minutiae such as gaming mousepads and food products.

The show broadcast its reviews via video-sharing website YouTube under the screen name 'Lord Karnage' until late 2013, when they moved to Dailymotion, citing issues with YouTube. In May 2014, via the Classic Game Room's Facebook Page and YouTube channel, it was announced that the show would again be posting episodes on YouTube. It also moved onto Patreon and Amazon Prime, before being cancelled in April 2019. After a four-year hiatus, the series returned to YouTube as Classic Game Room 2085 but was short lived due to declining viewer numbers not justifying the cost of making episodes. The series currently continues as Classic Game Room: The Podcast, where Mark talks about various aspects of games, music and general pop culture using his own signature flair of humor, insights and sometimes fantastical "real life" space stories.

== History ==
=== The Game Room era (1999–2000) ===
The show was originally titled The Game Room and presented by Mark Bussler and David Crosson. Founded by Bussler, it launched on November 7, 1999, on the internet startup website FromUSAlive. The pair had met at film school and shared a mutual love of movies and video games.

At first, Bussler and Crosson planned to review mainly then-modern games, but after a segment on older games proved to be popular, the show began reviewing earlier titles. The show was run on a tight US$50 budget, so improvised special effects were used. However, the low-budget nature of the show led to slow episode production rates, and when revenue failed to cover the costs of running the show, The Game Room was canceled on October 23, 2000. Tokyo Xtreme Racer 2 for the Sega Dreamcast was the last game to be reviewed on the show. Crosson moved onto a career in pharmaceuticals, while Bussler would spend the next 8 years producing and directing documentaries on American history, such as Expo: Magic of the White City, and working with actors such as Gene Wilder and Richard Dreyfuss.

=== The revival (HD) era (2008–2015) ===
The show returned as Classic Game Room HD (HD standing for Heavy Duty according to Bussler) on February 20, 2008, hosted by Bussler. Crosson appeared at the end of the show's first episodes, Captain America and The Avengers, where Mark asked him what he thought of the game.

On August 29, 2009, Bussler announced the launch of the Classic Game Room website ClassicGameRoom.net (now ClassicGameRoom.com) on the show's YouTube channel. The website hosts links and embedded videos to all the show's episodes as well as written reviews. Later, the site began hosting reviews written by fans of the show as well as linking to their videos.

In May 2010, Inecom launched a second show titled CGR Undertow hosted by Derek Buck. Later he was joined by TJ and a rotating cast of other reviews. The show had reviewers give their own take on games reviewed by Mark as well as other games not reviewed on the main show. In early 2012, some Classic Game Room reviews were co-hosted by Derek and TJ.

In late 2013, Classic Game Room left YouTube and began posting videos on Dailymotion. On May 8, 2014, Classic Game Room announced via its Facebook page and YouTube Channel that they will be returning to YouTube on May 10. Episodes first hosted on Dailymotion were added to their respective YouTube channels. The last episode posted on dailymotion was the review of Mario Kart 8.

On November 2, 2015, Bussler announced that the show would highly slow its production following the end of the 2015 year. Changes would include the shutting down of the show store and its secondary channel CGR Undertow entirely ending production. Bussler stated that this is due to a change in his life and he would like to focus more on his writing and film making. He also said that he would continue the show as a hobby similar to how it began for him.

=== CGR Mark 3, Patreon and Amazon (2016–2017) ===
Bussler later opened a Patreon for the series at the recommendation of fans in order to keep the series operating as normal, but would be renamed Classic Game Room Mark 3. The first CGR Mk3 was released on January 8, 2016. During mid-2016, due to declining YouTube ad revenue, Bussler experimented with a premium content delivery system. Subscribers on Patreon received full length game reviews, dubbed "Hyper Cuts", and free streaming video services received significantly shortened preview-length versions of the same reviews – effectively creating a partial paywall.

After this was met with negative reaction by fans, overall average runtime of the free streaming reviews returned to their normal length, with extended reviews available to Patreon subscribers. The extended reviews later became available on Amazon Prime in December that year.

=== CGR Mark 4 (2017–2018) ===
In June 2017, Bussler announced another update to Classic Game Room, intending to broaden the content variety that would encompass toys, comics and anything else Bussler fancied. Subsequent videos dropped the Mark 3 moniker.

=== Classic Game Room 2085 (since 2018) ===
On January 19, Bussler announced another new move off on YouTube and supposedly permanently onto Amazon Prime, under the new title of Classic Game Room 2085, for March. The new series would feature episodes far longer than YouTube, and cover a variety of games in each one. Bussler cited irrevocable differences and frustration with YouTube and its services as the contributing factor. Season 1 debuted on March 2.

On February 5, 2019, Bussler said a second season was as yet undecided. Around the time of the main series' 2023 revival, however, Bussler announced there would be a second season of 2085 starting at the beginning of 2024. Season 2 began as of January 1, 2024.

=== Classic Game Room Infinity (2018–2019) and second closure ===
From December 2018, Bussler returned to YouTube (as well as to Instagram and TikTok) with a new show titled Classic Game Room Infinity, which focused on shorter, snappier content. On April 24, 2019, Bussler announced on Instagram that he had decided to end all video production, and to continue the Classic Game Room brand as a book publisher.

=== Rebranding and Classic Game Room Year 24 ===
CGR Publishing has distributed books on video games, video production and American history. The channel was briefly known as Turbo Volcano and sold t-shirt merchandise, before being rebranded as '80s Comics reviewing classic comic books and art supplies. After a year of inactivity, the channel was rebranded as CGR Publishing in 2022 and began posting new commercials for books, as well as episodes of Bussler's podcast.

In mid-2023, the YouTube channel's name was once again changed back to "Classic Game Room". In June 2023, without making an official announcement, Bussler began uploading new game reviews to YouTube under the moniker. The first review was of the PS5 port of Ninja Golf, a game on the Atari 7800, and saw the return of the early HD era presentation, with Bussler only using narration over game footage.

== Other series ==
=== CGR Interviews ===
Bussler has also conducted a number of interviews with people involved with the video game industry, as part of the CGR Interviews series, such as his interview with Tommy Tallarico, video game soundtrack composer and founder of the Video Games Live concert series. In addition, Bussler has been interviewed for The Art of Community book.

=== CGR Films ===
A documentary film, Classic Game Room – The Rise and Fall of the Internet's Greatest Video Game Review Show, was released on August 28, 2007, on DVD. It is 100 minutes long and featured footage from a number of the original reviews and commentary from Bussler and Crosson. The film was directed by Bussler.

In 2015, a second film, The Best of Classic Game Room: 15th Anniversary Collection, also directed by Bussler, was released on Blu-ray and DVD. It has a runtime of 280 minutes and features a collection of videos previously available on YouTube but also includes plenty of exclusive material including exclusive game reviews, an interview with Dave Crosson, a commentary track and more all wrapped in a comedic story arc involving time travel, robots, and clones.

2015 also saw the release of a compilation film from the sister channel CGR Undertow, A Great Big Bunch of CGR Undertow, on DVD. It is a collection of previously released reviews presented by Derek Buck and his clone. Special features include a mini documentary and a blooper reel.

In 2016, Bussler announced a series of feature length video game reviews, the Classic Game Room Feature Reviews, beginning with MUSHA. The 90-minute reviews, funded by Kickstarter crowdfunding, would be in-depth analysis of games, covering everything from presentation to controllers, with comical elements. The following reviews were Herzog Zwei and Super Pac-Man.

=== CGR Podcast ===
In November 2021, Bussler launched a new podcast, CGR Podcast, featuring Turbo Volcano. Presented by Bussler, the show discussed behind-the-scenes work in publishing and retro pop culture. Episodes began to be uploaded to YouTube the following year, starting with Episode #8: Nobody Puts Truxton in the corner.

== See also ==
- Expo: Magic of the White City – a 2005 documentary by Bussler on the Chicago World's Fair, narrated by Gene Wilder.
