= The Devil's Mistress (1965 film) =

- Theatrical release poster
- Directed by: Orville Wanzer
- Written by: Orville Wanzer
- Produced by: Wes Moreland
- Starring: Joan Stapleton; Robert Gregory; Forrest Westmoreland; Douglas Warren; Oren Williams; Arthur Resley
- Cinematography: Teddy Gregory
- Music by: Billy Allen; Douglas Warren
- Production company: WGW Pictures
- Distributed by: Holiday Pictures; Emerson Film Enterprises
- Release date: November 1965 (Las Cruces)
- Running time: 66 minutes
- Country: United States
- Language: English

The Devil's Mistress is a 1965 American Western horror film written and directed by Orville Wanzer. The film's plot follows Liah, an Indian half-caste, who takes her revenge on four ruthless cowboy desperadoes who have gunned down her husband for the sheer joy of killing.

== Cast ==
- Joan Stapleton as Athaliah
- Robert Gregory as Frank
- Wes Moreland as Charlie
- Douglas Warren as Joe
- Oren Williams as Will
- Arthur Resley as Jeroboam

== Production ==
Filming took place in Las Cruces, New Mexico in several weekends.

== Reception ==
A review from Movies and Mania reads: "The Devil's Mistress is not a coherent picture; that may have been the point. Questions are posed but never answered. The couple has travelled from Salem, "to escape religious persecution" – is the woman, Liah, a witch? Why does the meat they serve their ravenous houseguests taste strange? Is Liah avenging herself by causing the deaths of these men – two of whom she kisses passionately, imparting some kind of fatal malady; another is bitten by a rattler; the fourth dies by hanging – or is she the agent of a higher power: "I will send the poison of the serpent and the mouth of the beast upon them"? The ending is characteristically enigmatic."

Rob Freese of Videoscope noted its "weird fever dream ambiance" and called the film "a decent 'bottom of the bill' feature".
