= Heller in Pink Tights =

1959 film

- Film poster
- Directed by: George Cukor
- Screenplay by: Dudley Nichols; Walter Bernstein
- Based on: Heller with a Gun by Louis L'Amour
- Produced by: Carlo Ponti; Marcello Girosi
- Starring: Sophia Loren; Anthony Quinn
- Cinematography: Harold Lipstein
- Edited by: Howard A. Smith
- Music by: Daniele Amfitheatrof
- Production company: Paramount Pictures
- Distributed by: Paramount Pictures
- Release date: March 1, 1960
- Running time: 101 minutes
- Country: United States
- Language: English

Heller In Pink Tights is a 1960 American Technicolor Western film adapted from Louis L'Amour's 1955 novel Heller with a Gun. It stars Sophia Loren and Anthony Quinn and was directed by George Cukor.

The movie is noted for its lavishly ornate costumes by Edith Head and its unique visual style influenced by technical advisor George Hoyningen-Huene.

As in L'Amour's novel, there is no character in the film named Heller.

== Plot ==
In the 1880s, followed by bill collectors, the Healy Dramatic Company arrives in Cheyenne to play at the west's grandest theater. Tom Healy's troupe includes performers Angela Rossini, Della Southby, Lorna Hathaway and Doc Montague. After a creditor arrives, Angela risks herself and the night's receipts in a poker game with gunslinger Clint Mabry but loses.

After the company leaves Cheyenne, Mabry joins them and kills three attacking Indians. In their haste the team leaves their cart and other belongings behind. After a long trek, they reach the mountains. Angela confesses to Tom that she lost herself to Mabry in a poker game, and Tom is upset that Mabry claims her as his property.

A gunman hired by a man named De Leon shoots Tom, thinking that he is Mabry. When Mabry finds the gunman, he learns that De Leon has placed a contract on his life. De Leon had originally hired Mabry to kill three men in Cheyenne for $5,000.

The group reaches a nearby city but Tom has a high fever. He breaks up the company and tells Angela to go back to her own place and that after selling the horses he will send her share of the money.

Mabry asks Angela to help him recover the $5,000 from De Leon. She collects the money and waits in Bonanza for a suitable time when Mabry can join her. Mabry tells her to keep what she had lost in the poker game. De Leon instructs his two spies to follow her. Angela purchases a theater with the $5,000 and names it Healy's Theater.

After recovering from his wounds, Tom and the other team members come to Bonanza. They are surprised to see the theater. They share a happy reunion and stage the drama Mazeppa to great success.

Mabry arrives to claim his money from Angela, and she confesses that she spent it all on the theater, but because of the success of their production, she is able to pay him. Mabry is noticed by De Leon's henchmen, and Tom aids his escape.

In the empty theater, Tom waits for Angela, who is missing along with Mabry. When she arrives, she assures Tom that she has settled with Mabry by mortgaging the theater and tells him that she signed the contract as Mrs. Thomas Healy. Tom takes her into his arms and they happily depart.

== Cast ==
- Sophia Loren as Angela Rossini
- Anthony Quinn as Thomas "Tom" Healey
- Margaret O'Brien as Della Southby
- Steve Forrest as Clint Mabry
- Eileen Heckart as Mrs. Lorna Hathaway
- Ramon Novarro as De Leon
- Edmund Lowe as Manfred 'Doc' Montague
- George Mathews as Sam Pierce
- Edward Binns as Sheriff Ed McClain
- Frank Silvera as Santis (a miner)
- Cal Bolder as Goober (De Leon's man)
