= Curse of the Undead =

1959 Gothic Western film

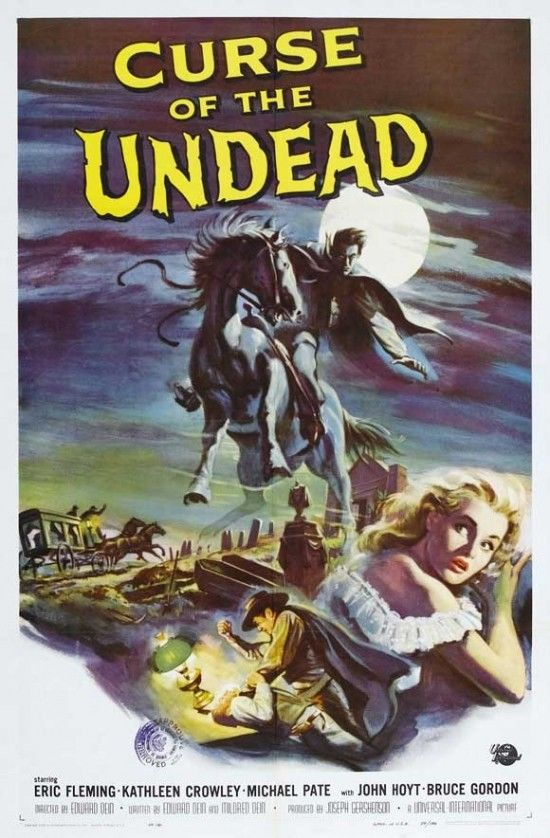
- Theatrical release poster by Reynold Brown
- Directed by: Edward Dein
- Written by: Edward Dein; Mildred Dein
- Produced by: Joseph Gershenson
- Starring: Eric Fleming; Michael Pate; Kathleen Crowley; Bruce Gordon; John Hoyt
- Cinematography: Ellis W. Carter
- Edited by: George Gittens
- Music by: Irving Gertz
- Color process: Black and white
- Production company: Universal-International Pictures
- Distributed by: Universal Pictures
- Release date: December 1959
- Running time: 79 minutes
- Country: United States
- Language: English

Curse of the Undead is a 1959 American Gothic Western film directed by Edward Dein and starring Eric Fleming, Michael Pate, John Hoyt and Kathleen Crowley.

== Plot ==
In an Old West town, young girls are dying of a mysterious wasting disease. Dr. John Carter and his daughter Dolores have been tending to patients for hours, but just lost another. After Preacher Dan Young's nightlong vigil, Cora looks like she will survive. During breakfast with Cora's parents, they hear Cora scream. Cora is found dead on her bed, her window open. As he kneels to pray, Dan notices two small, bloody holes in Cora's throat.

Returning to their ranch, Doc Carter finds his son Tim extremely upset after the actions of their neighbor, Buffer, including damming a stream on the Carter ranch and having his men assault anyone who complains. Doc drives back into town to see the local sheriff. Convinced Buffer is responsible, Tim drunkenly confronts him at the saloon. Goading him to engage him in a duel with insults about his courage, Buffer eventually pulls his weapon out as the two shoot, with Buffer ending up fatally wounded. Dolores hangs up "Gun Wanted" posters all over town, offeringaf $100 to anyone who can gun down the "murderer"; After the stranger promises to kill Buffer, one of the rancher's men shoots at the stranger. As the stranger leaves, Buffer sacks the man despite his insisting he hit his target dead center.

The stranger, calling himself Drake Robey, arrives at the Carter ranch. He reacts to a thorn cross on a button worn by Dan. When asked, Dan says it was an ordination gift; the thorn coming from the site of the Crucifixion. Despite Dan's protests, Dolores hires Robey. He moves into the house, and that night, Robey sneaks into Dolores' room and drinks some of her blood. She offers him the cemetery caretaker's cottage to stay in if he doesn't mind being near the dead; Robey says "The dead don't bother me – it's the living that causes me trouble."

At home, Dan knocks over the safety box, cracking it open. Within it, he finds the 1860 diary of Don Miguel Robles, the former owner of the land. According to the diary, Don Robles sent his son Drago to Madrid on business without his new bride Isabella. Drago returns to find that his brother Roberto has seduced Isabella. Drago kills Roberto and then, overcome with grief, stabs himself. Soon young girls in town begin dying because of a mysterious curse. One night, Don Miguel finds Drago leaning over Isabella's neck. Realizing Drago is a vampire, Don Miguel tries to kill Drago and end the curse by plunging a silver dagger through Drago's heart as he lay in his coffin. After confessing his actions to the priest, he learned a wooden stake is needed to destroy a vampire. He then finds Drago's coffin empty except for the dagger. Hidden within the diary is a photograph of Drago Robles – it is Drake Robey in Spanish clothing.

When Dan tells Dolores about the evening's events, she does not believe him. Dan takes her to the family crypt to find Drago Robles' empty coffin, except for a silver dagger. When Dan insists they look in every coffin for Robey – including her father and brother – Dolores explodes and throws him out. After Dan leaves to get a court order to do so, Dolores, apparently weakened by blood loss, her anger at Dan, and Robey's hypnotic influence, collapses. Robey emerges from a Carter coffin to feed from Dolores before carrying her back home. After Dolores awakens, Robey shows her the Rancho Robles map; the stream Buffer has been damming is on her property, not his. Robey goes into town to show the map to Buffer, who angrily shoots Robey. Robey fires back, killing Buffer, and walks away unscathed.

Robey reports back to Dolores when she sees a bullet hole in his vest – he claims his cigar case stopped Buffer's bullet. Robey learns that Dan is heading for the county seat to get a court order to open the graves. Robey promises to join with Dolores to stop him. Warned by Dolores' housekeeper, Dan makes preparations. Robey heads for town to "talk" Dan out of getting that court order, but Dan will not be stopped. They challenge each other to a shoot-out, and Dan fires first, just as Dolores arrives. Robey collapses and disintegrates into dust, leaving only his empty clothes behind. Dan walks over to Robey's clothes and picks up his bullet...which has his thorn cross on it.

== Cast ==
- Eric Fleming as Preacher Dan
- Michael Pate as Drake Robey
- Kathleen Crowley as Dolores Carter
- John Hoyt as Dr Carter
- Bruce Gordon as Buffer
- Edward Binns as Sheriff
- Jimmy Murphy as Tim Carter
- Helen Kleeb as Dora
- Jay Adler as Bartender
- Eddie Parker as Henchman (as Edwin Parker)
- John Truax as Henchman
- Frankie Van as Henchman
- Rush Williams as Henchmen

== Production ==
Curse of the Undead started as a gag idea by husband-and-wife team Edward and Mildred Dein. Universal-International producer Joseph Gershenson heard about the idea from his wife and quickly phoned Edward Dein: "Hey, smartass. The good stuff you don't give us. I want to make this picture." According to an early studio announcement the film was intended as a satire of the vampire theme set in the Old West.

== Release ==
Curse of the Undead was released in the US on a double bill with Hammer's The Mummy (1959).

== Legacy ==
Curse of the Undead was later called the first Gothic Western film. Contrasted with the later films Billy the Kid Versus Dracula and Jesse James Meets Frankenstein's Daughter (both 1966), Curse of the Undead was more Gothic, while the 1966 films were closer to the horror genre, and campier in tone. Although few American films followed the influence of Curse of the Undead in melding the Gothic film with the Western, several Italian Spaghetti Western films fell into the Gothic genre.

Dennis Schwartz of Ozus' World Movie Reviews rated Curse of the Undead score B−, calling it "A gimmicky B horror-western, that soon wears thin". Dave Sindelar of Fantastic Movie Musings and Ramblings called it " the most successful merging of the western and horror genres", while also criticizing the film's soundtrack, and some of the performances. TV Guide awarded the film one out of four stars, calling the film "mediocre".
