= Darkwatch =

2005 video game

- North American PlayStation 2 cover art
- Developer: High Moon Studios
- Publishers: NA: Capcom; PAL: Ubisoft
- Directors: Chris Ulm; Emmanuel Valdez; Clinton Keith
- Producers: John Rowe; Brian Johnson; Steven B. Sargent
- Designers: Paul O'Connor; Brent Disbrow; Matt Tieger
- Programmer: Stephane Etienne
- Artists: Farzad Varahramyan; Sean Miller; Francis Tsai
- Writers: Paul O'Connor; Chris Ulm
- Composers: Mike Reagan; Asdru Sierra
- Engine: RenderWare
- Platforms: PlayStation 2, Xbox
- Release: NA: August 16, 2005; AU: October 6, 2005; EU: October 7, 2005
- Genre: First-person shooter
- Modes: Single-player, multiplayer

Darkwatch (also known as Darkwatch: Curse of the West) is a 2005 first-person shooter video game for the PlayStation 2 and Xbox. It was developed by High Moon Studios (formerly Sammy Studios) and published by Capcom in the United States and by Ubisoft in Europe and Australia.

The game mixes the Western, horror and steampunk genres, telling the story of Jericho Cross, an outlaw gunfighter in the late 19th-century American Frontier who has been turned into a vampire and forcibly recruited by the titular monster-hunting secret organization to fight against supernatural forces.

Darkwatch was met with a generally positive critical reception, acclaimed in particular for its relatively unique horror Western setting and artistic merits. The game was accompanied by an extensive promotional campaign and was planned to be the first installment of a new media franchise, but its sequel got canceled in 2007 and the film adaptation remains in development hell.

== Gameplay ==
A screenshot of first-person shooter gameplay in Darkwatch, without the HUD

Darkwatch features a reputation system that affects player's abilities in addition to the player character Jericho's starting, neutral vampiric powers of "Blood Shield" (a regenerating force field), "Vampire Jump" (a double jump that can be aborted at any moment) and "Blood Vision" (a system of thermal vision highlighting enemies and objects that also acts as a zoom). Through the game, Jericho is met with multiple choices of a good or evil variety, allowing the player to select morality awarding Jericho new powers, called "Brands", based on the choices he made. The good path powers are "Silver Bullet" (making the player's weapons cause more damage), "Fear" (confusing minor enemies), "Mystic Armor" (an extra shield system) and "Vindicator" (bolts of lightning destroying all nearby enemies). The evil powers are "Blood Frenzy" (granting an immunity to damage and extremely powerful melee attacks), "Turn" (turning undead enemies into allies), "Black Shroud" (stealing life force from nearby enemies) and "Soul Stealer" (destroying nearby enemies and stealing their souls). The powers can be activated for a limited time when the HUD's blood bar, which is fueled through collecting souls of the slain enemies, is completely full. Jericho's health is also restored through collecting the souls.

During the daylight hours, Jericho's powers are gone, so he has to fight as a normal human, using a wide variety of weaponry, from a Darkwatch's standard-issue 24-shot Redeemer handgun to a crossbow firing explosive arrows and a rocket launcher, as well as melee combat. In some missions, Jericho can drive a Gatling gun-equipped Coyote Steamwagon vehicle; using it or a horse changes perspective to the third-person view. During horse-riding rail shooter sequences, Jericho is granted unlimited ammunition and high attack speed, at the cost of only being able to use the Redeemer.

=== Multiplayer ===
The Xbox version has competitive multiplayer for up to 16 players online, although system link is not possible. While Xbox Live support ended for the original Xbox in 2010, Darkwatch is playable online on the replacement Xbox servers called Insignia. The PlayStation 2 version does not offer any online connectivity and competitive multiplayer is limited to two players (or four players while using an optional multitap device) via split screen gameplay. In multiplayer matches, the players can pick up the "Silver Bullet", "Mystic Armor and "Blood Frenzy" powers as floating power-ups that activate immediately. The game's story mode is also available for split screen cooperative gameplay on the PlayStation 2, a feature absent from the Xbox version. In the co-op mode, both players play as a rank-and-file Darkwatch Regulators but cutscenes designed for the single-player mode and featuring Jericho Cross as the main character are left unchanged, causing a number of glaring continuity errors.

== Plot ==
=== Story ===
The game's story (narrated by Peter Jason) follows the exploits of a former American Civil War veteran and wanted outlaw named Jericho Cross and his employment in an ancient vampire-hunting order known as the Darkwatch. After unwittingly releasing the Darkwatch's greatest enemy, a vampire lord named Lazarus Malkoth, Jericho is conscripted into the Darkwatch as an elite operative. Jericho, however, is slowly turning into a vampire himself, as a result of being bitten by Lazarus. The game outlines either Jericho's struggle for humanity or his descent into darkness, depending on the player's actions. Darkwatch was an ancient organization established centuries ago by a Roman named Lazarus Malkoth to combat the dark forces that was responsible for the decline of the Roman Empire. However, in pursuit for more powerful means to combat the dark forces, Lazarus tried to use the power of the dark forces against themselves, resulting him being possessed by a demon and thus turning him into a vampire lord.

The game begins in the Arizona Territory in 1876 with Jericho attempting to rob a Darkwatch train as his last job to finally retire from the life of crime that is transporting the captured Lazarus Malkoth to the Darkwatch Citadel, a frequently mentioned and often visited location in the game. His actions inadvertently release Lazarus into the West. In a seeming bit of mercy, Lazarus bites Jericho and gives him the curse of the vampire, causing him to slowly turn into one. The game continues with the introduction of Darkwatch agent Cassidy Sharp as well as the appearance of Shadow, Jericho's undead horse whom he fed on and turned in a frenzy after being bitten by Lazarus.

As the game progresses, Jericho finally makes his way to the Darkwatch Citadel, where he meets General Clay Cartwright, the current leader of the order. Cartwright puts him through the Torture Maze, the Darkwatch initiation exercise which was designed as a test for Darkwatch Regulators, but Jericho gets a special version specially designed by Cartwright to kill him. When Jericho passes the test anyway, he begins to do missions for the Darkwatch. Missions include tasks ranging from fixing some of the damage he has caused to acquiring Darkwatch equipment, such as the Darklight Prism, a stone that allows vampires within its vicinity to both use their powers and walk in sunlight. On some of his missions Jericho is accompanied by other Darkwatch forces including his new partner, a sultry and vicious temptress named Tala. Eventually, during their night of passion, Tala lures him to bite her and inherits some portion of his power, transforming herself into a half-vampire creature similar to him. She then betrays the Darkwatch from within, allowing hordes of the undead to invade its headquarters.

A final showdown ensues with Lazarus, in which Jericho arises victorious, and a choice is given for him to side with either Cassidy or Tala. Either Jericho rids the West of the Curse of Lazarus, or he becomes the Curse; the player's choice determines how the game ends. If the character were to choose the good option, then the final fight will be against the vampiric Tala; if the player chooses to take Lazarus' curse for himself, then he must fight the ghost of Cassidy. The final battle takes place in a ritual site where Lazarus built to evoke a powerful spell to take over the world. The bad ending shows the now-monstrous Jericho killing Tala and riding into the night, while the good ending shows Cassidy's soul being released.

=== Characters ===
- Jericho Cross (voiced by Christopher Corey Smith): The protagonist of the game, a jaded American Civil War deserter and drifter who became a gunslinger and train robber. During his "one last job", he releases Lazarus Malkoth from his prison in a failed attempt to steal the contents. While dueling with Lazarus, Jericho gets bitten and infected by the vampire curse. His already deadly skills are enhanced by his vampire powers that afford him superhuman strength, increased endurance, enhanced agility, and heightened senses, in the form of the bioluminescent red orb that regenerated from his empty eye socket. Shadow is Jericho's demonic horse that appears at his beckon. According to the developers, they created "deep psychological profiles of every character in the game" with "hope that Jericho's character arc — as this desperate lone wolf that is robbing trains with a subconscious death wish — makes a believable transition into this half-vampire hybrid gunslinger and will ultimately envelop the player in his destiny: which is a guy that can be either a hero or a terror. Basically, we just want people to care about this character and what happens to him — and I can't think of a first-person shooter that's really made us do that yet".
- Cassidy Sharp (voiced by Jennifer Hale): The game's first female protagonist. Cassidy is the agent who attempts to stop Jericho on the train in the game's opening sequence. After the explosion of Lazarus' prison, she joins Jericho but is soon murdered by Lazarus. Cassidy returns as a good ghost and befriends Jericho, aiding him in his mission to stop Lazarus. As a little girl, Cassidy was orphaned in a vampire attack and then raised as a ward of the Darkwatch. Eventually, she became the most serious and dangerous agent in the organisation, yet really she is also deeply insecure about herself. If fought as the final boss, she turns into an angel.
- Tala (meaning "Stalking Wolf") (voiced by Rose McGowan): The game's second female protagonist. Tala is a Native American shaman and a power-hungry Darkwatch agent. When she was young, Tala lost her seer mother and became an outcast from her own tribe, fearful of her mediumship abilities. Her father was then killed by a band of fur traders and she herself was kidnapped and abused by them, until her captors were killed by vampires. Tala was then herself rescued by the Darkwatch troops, who turned her into one of their own. However, her experiences made her extremely bitter, and she began pursuing ever more power at any cost, secretly desiring to get revenge upon the world for the death of her parents. Despite her ruthlessness, Tala quickly rose through the Darkwatch ranks due to her fearless battle efficiency. The developers described her as not evil but "just ambitious". Tala is the only character who uses kicks in the game, due to the artists deciding that "some of the combat moves the actress performed fit the character so well that we changed the combat system she's using". If fought as the final boss, she turns into a demon. According to GameSpy, Tala is "without question, the more difficult boss to battle".
- Lazarus Malkoth (voiced by Keith Szarabajka): A Roman who first founded the Darkwatch society in 66 AD in order to battle the dark forces responsible for the decline of the Roman Empire. He eventually got possessed by a demon and himself became a powerful vampire and turned on the organization he founded, raising an undead army to aid him in his task. The Darkwatch then pursued Lazarus across Europe and later America. During the game's development, the villain's name was Scourge.
- Clay Cartwright (voiced by Michael Bell): The brutal and scheming field commander of the Darkwatch. An American Civil War veteran in the rank of brigadier general, Cartwright snipes Jericho and enslaves him, forcing him to participate in a series of trials before inducting him into the organization.

== Development ==
=== Concept ===
An early concept art for the game's protagonist.

The development of the game began in the summer of 2002, when Sammy Studios' first internal development team, informally called "Team 1", decided to "bring a refreshing theme to a genre riddled with the stereotypical sci-fi, fantasy, and military themes", an idea soon approved by the Sammy Corporation president Hajime Satomi. The original game concept was not very dark and the vampires "felt more like a cartoon property". In the early derivatives of the project, the game "looked more like something from Pixar" and its protagonist was supposed to be Chaz Bartlett, a "vaguely bumbling sort of comic relief character", described as an "Eastern dude who was a card cheat" similar to Bret Maverick.

The game's lead designer and writer Paul O'Connor said that the original 'high concept' for Darkwatch was "Blade meets Men in Black in the Old West", but "in the two years that the property has been in development, it has grown in other directions and taken on a life of its own. The game is quite a bit darker than Blade, and we've completely lost the tongue-in-cheek feeling of Men in Black". He added it "leans toward the Army of Darkness side of things, though without the slapstick", and "with the accessibility of Raiders of the Lost Ark". The turning point for setting a much darker and mature tone was the final iteration of Jericho's character design. Tala was originally intended to also be a player character, but the studio's marketing department "didn't think that would fly".

=== Production ===
The game was developed for the PlayStation 2 and Xbox side by side, with a PC version initially described as "possible". Creative director Emmanuel Valdez said that "for the longest time we were debating whether or not to bring it out for GameCube", before deciding "there's just not a lot there in the GameCube market right now". There were also plans to port the game for the PlayStation Portable. The game engine for Darkwatch features middleware engines RenderWare, Havok and Quazal, while Autodesk MotionBuilder was used to create character animation and motion capture.

The game was "intentionally designed as a cross between Halo and Silverado". O'Connor said Halo was "of course" an inspiration, comparing Darkwatch to the horror aspects of Halo, and senior designer Brent Disbrow said he expected it to "stand on par with games like Halo 2". Other video game inspirations recounted by O'Connor and Valdez included Half-Life, Medal of Honor, Metroid Prime and TimeSplitters. Lead level designer Matt Tieger said that a creation of one of the game's bosses was "inspired by all the fun" that he had while playing the Metal Slug 2D shooter series with its "crazy bosses". O'Connor said the game's reputation system was inspired by the contrast between the Old West figures such as Billy the Kid and the likes of Wyatt Earp, who "both were feared gunslingers, but one was a psychopathic killer and the other was a good guy/lawman".

The developers licensed Ennio Morricone's main theme from the film The Good, The Bad, and The Ugly which was remixed to fit the horror feel of the game. The remaining music on the soundtrack is completely original, co-composed by Mike Reagan, a veteran film and game music composer, and Asdru Sierra, frontman for the Latin Grammy-winning indie band Ozomatli, who said: "Our goal is to help connect the audience with a conflicted character, one who alternates between moments of providence and misguidance, and accomplish that with a musical score of cinematic proportions". The game's title sequence animation was created by Kyle Cooper using a collage of computer graphics images and live-action footage.

Darkwatch was officially unveiled on January 12, 2004, its announcement accompanied by a showing of its playable multiplayer deathmatch mode, and was originally slated for a Q4 2004 release. At one point, the game remained in limbo for several months until May 2005, when High Moon Studios, by then a fully independent development company, found a publisher in Capcom.

== Release ==
Darkwatch, described as High Moon's "flagship property", was released by Capcom in North America on August 16, 2005, and by Ubisoft in Australia and Europe on October 6 and October 7, respectively.

=== Promotion ===
In 2004, Sammy launched darkwatch.org, an official fan community website allowing fans to win points for prizes through completing various challenges while promoting the game. An interactive game demo of Darkwatch was shown at E3 2004 inside a custom-build Gothic architecture-inspired theatre dubbed "desecrated church". A trailer for the game, created by Brain Zoo Studios, was nominated for the Golden Trailer Awards and won two Aurora Awards in the categories "Best of Show: Use of Animation" and "Best of Show: Entertainment".

In August 2005, Capcom launched a major marketing campaign to support the upcoming release. This included an extensive marketing program in the U.S. television networks, print advertisements in several leading video game and men's magazines, radio promotions broadcasts on alternative rock stations in major markets, and pre-order and point of sale purchase campaigns. A Darkwatch music video to Good Charlotte's song "Predictable" was also featured in MTV2's Video Mods.

A major part of the game's promotional campaign was based on using the sex appeal of its female characters. In October 2004, a picture of Tala "wearing only a feather in her hair" was featured in a spread of the first special edition of Playboy that spotlighted provocative video game characters, also accompanying the article "Gaming Grows Up". Several more naked pictures of her and Cassidy appeared in Playboy's "Girls of Gaming" series in October 2005 and again in December 2007. A few censored topless sketches of Tala were posted alongside a fake interview in an exclusive online gallery by IGN and a pinup picture was featured in IGN's Hotlist magazine in June 2006. She was also featured in exclusive pictures on the cover and the pinup poster of Play issue #44 in 2005 and in the 2007 calendar The Art of Heavy Metal.

== Other media ==
=== Soundtrack and book ===
The Art of Darkwatch, a 176-page art book for the game, was published in August 2005 by Design Studio Press. Darkwatch Original Game Music Score, a 30-track original soundtrack, was released in November 2006 by Sierra Entertainment.

=== Comic ===
A comic titled "Innocence", published in the July 2005 issue of Heavy Metal, serves as an immediate prequel and expanded introduction to the game. Set in the Nebraska Territory, the story follows them as former partners reuniting for a mission to capture the tomb of Lazarus, an ancient vampire lord and Darkwatch's original founder. Along the way, they release Jericho when they raid a jail. "Cass" does not hide her current dislike of Tala, but Tala kills Cassidy's father-turned-vampire, saving her life. The comic was written by the game's designers Ulm and O'Connor and illustrated by Philip Tan and Brian Haberlin. The issue's award-winning cover art was created by Aaron Habibipour and Sergio Paez.

== Reception ==
Reception

Aggregate scores
Aggregator	Score
GameRankings	77.53% (Xbox); 76.10% (PS2)
Metacritic	75/100 (Xbox); 74/100 (PS2)

Review scores
Publication	Score
Eurogamer	5/10
G4	3/5
Game Informer	8.5/10
GamePro	8/10
GameRevolution	B−
GameSpot	7.9/10
GameSpy	4/5
GameTrailers	7.6/10
GameZone	8/10
IGN	7.9/10
Official Xbox Magazine (US)	8/10
PALGN	6.5/10
TeamXbox	8.3/10

Upon its release, Darkwatch received generally favorable reviews from most gaming media. According to review aggregation site GameTab, the PlayStation 2 version scored an averaged rating of 82% from the gaming press with the Xbox version scoring 85%. It also won several art direction and visual design awards, including five Davey Awards and a Telly Award.

The game received the score of 7.9 ("Good") from both Bob Colayco of GameSpot ("If you're looking for an intense shooter experience, Darkwatch will not disappoint") and Jeremy Dunham of IGN ("Cowboys, vampires, and sexy dead girls are fun in parties, but not so much alone"). John Scalzo of Gaming Target wrote that "for anyone looking for something a little different out of their FPS experience, Darkwatch is that game". The reviewer in GamePro wrote that Darkwatch "mixes its western roots with gothic horror and steampunk aesthetics, and the results are uniquely engaging", adding that if some the game's "cooler" concepts "had been explored further, lengthening the game in the process, Darkwatch could've rivaled the best of the genre". Official Xbox Magazine called it "a solid and robust blaster that's tons of fun. Helped no end by the excellent Blood Powers and top multiplayer".

Several reviews praised the game's setting. GameSpy's David Chapman called it "a truly remarkable experience. And, while the game itself may not have broken any new ground, the world it introduces more than makes up for that. It will leave gamers hungry for more". According to Game Informer, "in terms of gameplay quality, this may be another middle-of-the-road shooter, but the unique premise sets it aside from everything else out there". Greg Bemis of G4TV wrote that the biggest draw in Darkwatch is the "different enough" setting that "does fall back on tired video game clichés from time to time like big-breasted, leather-clad babes who speak in aggressive sexually suggestive double entendres, but it's nice to see something—anything—that's a little off the beaten path". GameShark's Will Jayson Hill wrote that "about the sharpest criticism that can be leveled at Darkwatch is that it really adds nothing original in the gameplay department. Aside from its extremely well executed western/horror environment, Darkwatch is a pretty generic FPS game with a weaker multiplayer mode". On the other hand, some reviews thought that the gameplay was actually the strongest part of the game. Official UK PlayStation 2 Magazine stated that Darkwatch "has a few neat ideas but wins us over by doing solid shooting well. Fast-paced with cool guns, what's not to like?" GameZone's Mike David wrote that only a "weak plot pacing and that feeling that something is missing" kept it from being given a score of 9/10.

However, some of the reviews were more negative. PALGN's Jeremy Jastrzab opined that "Darkwatch gives vampires, undead, cowboys and plenty of bullets to fire. But that's about it. Otherwise, Darkwatch is a fairly standard affair that's worth a rental". According to Official U.S. PlayStation Magazine, "Darkwatch doesn't amount to much more than your run-of-the mill first-person shooter". Eurogamer's Martin Coxall called it "a generic and quickly tiresome shooter, with a contrived premise which, unfortunately, does nothing to elevate it".

According to a retrospective article by GamesRadar in 2009, "while it didn't innovate much in the gameplay department, Darkwatch was a solid shooter with proficient controls. Its real strength was its unique horror/western setting and bizarre selection of gothy undead characters and enemies". In 2010, GamesRadar's Mikel Raparaz ranked Darkwatch as sixth on the list of the top seven weirdest westerns, commenting that "the gothy trappings overlay a pretty awesome, Halo-inspired shooter". In a 2012 article about the history of steampunk video games, Mike Mahardy of Game Informer wrote that "although not a widely known shooter, Darkwatch garnered a cult following with its unique story and unusual setting". That same year, Robert Workman of Comic Book Resources called Darkwatch "in particular [...] a fantastic effort, a first-person shooter with beautiful, spooky atmosphere and excellent gameplay". In 2013, Metro included it among the "games that didn't get the love they deserved". Mark L. Bussler of Classic Game Room said in a retro video review that among many shooters on the PlayStation 2, "few are as fun as this", adding that Darkwatch should be "in your collection" alongside Red Faction and TimeSplitters. FEARNET included it among their five favorite vampire games in 2014.

== Legacy ==
=== Cancelled sequel ===
Darkwatch was supposed to be first of a series of games that would be set in different time periods, including Ancient Rome, the Crusades era and World War II. O'Connor said they wanted "to tell not only the story of Jericho Cross but of the Darkwatch as an organization, from its origins in Roman times to its ultimate fate in Earth's future". Darkwatch 2 was in development by High Moon Studios for the PlayStation 3 and Xbox 360 between 2005 and 2007, and its technical demo gameplay footage (based on the original game) was shown at the Game Developers Conference 2006. After the game was canceled, the studio abandoned further attempts to create their own IP and instead concentrated on developing licensed games, such as Transformers and Deadpool.

In 2009, GamesRadar ranked Darkwatch as the 22nd top "game with untapped franchise potential", adding that a sequel could have improved the original game's supernatural powers and its "anemic" multiplayer mode and "make it shine". Classic Game Room's Mark Bussler expressed regret that so many bad games did receive sequels, while Darkwatch did not.

=== Film project ===
In 2006, Roger Avary, who wrote the script for the film adaptation of the Silent Hill video game series, "recently was asked to work on the Darkwatch movie script based on the Capcom vampire Western game of which he is a fan, but his schedule interfered". In 2011, it was reported that Glen Morgan and James Wong, the writers/directors/producers behind The X-Files and the Final Destination film series, "have developed a pitch based on the game's plot and action sequences, and are currently writing a screenplay". Morgan and Wong's involvement with the project has been first reported already in 2004.

== See also ==
- Clive Barker's Jericho
- Deadlands
- Evil West
- High Moon
- Hunt: Showdown
- Jonah Hex
- Vampire Hunter D
- Blood
