= Horror Western =

Film subgenre

The horror Western is a crossgenre of both the horror and Western genres. It has it roots in films such as Curse of the Undead (1959), featuring Michael Pate as a vampire gunfighter; and Billy the Kid vs. Dracula (1966), which depicts the real-life outlaw Billy the Kid fighting against the fictional vampire Dracula.

Other horror Western horror films include The Devil's Mistress (1965). Newer examples include Near Dark (1987) directed by Kathryn Bigelow, which tells the story about a human falling in love with a vampire. From Dusk till Dawn (1996) by Robert Rodriguez deals with outlaws battling vampires. Vampires (1998), by John Carpenter, is about a group of vampires and vampire hunters looking for an ancient relic in the modern West. Ravenous (1999) concerns cannibalism at a remote United States Army outpost and The Burrowers (2008) is about a band of trackers who are stalked by the titular creatures. Abraham Lincoln: Vampire Hunter (2012) depicts Abraham Lincoln's life as a secret vampire hunter. Bone Tomahawk (2015), received wide critical acclaim for its tale of cannibalism, but like many other films in the genre, it was not a commercial success.

Among games which combine the two genres, Deadlands is an alternate history role-playing game. Darkwatch (2005); Undead Nightmare (2010), an expansion to Red Dead Redemption (2010) is an example of a video game in the genre, telling the tale of a zombie outbreak in the Old West.

Examples of literature in the horror western genre including the 2026 comic book miniseries Black Star, which is set amid the bloody fur trade wars of early 1800s Winnipeg, and depicts a secret society of magic users who use their powers to manipulate historical events in order create a better world, albeit at the expense of many innocent lives.

== See also ==
- Gothic Western

== Bibliography ==
- Newman, Kim (1990). Wild West Movies. London: Bloomsbury Publishing Ltd. ISBN 978-07-47507-47-5.
