= Tala (Darkwatch) =

Video game character

- Darkwatch character
- Tala concept art for Darkwatch by Steve Jung
- First game: Darkwatch (2005)
- Designed by: Steve Jung; Sean Letts (animation)
- Voiced by: Rose McGowan; Abby Craden (additional voice)

In-universe information
- Nationality: American

Tala is a character introduced in the 2005 first person shooter game Darkwatch developed by High Moon Studios and published by Capcom. A Native American Shaman, Tala works with the group Darkwatch as a Regulator, helping to fend off the forces of the undead in the Wild West. She initially works with another Regulator, Cassidy, to help a cowboy outlaw named Jericho who was infected with vampirism. She later turns on the group after seducing Jericho and becoming a vampire herself, and in the game's conclusion is killed by him either as the final obstacle to Jericho's cure or a victim of his bloodlust. In-game, she is voiced by Rose McGowan, with additional voice work provided by Abby Craden.

The character received praise for her sexualized appearance and role as a Native American woman in video games. However, she was also criticized for reinforcing stereotypes against Native American culture and women in general along those same lines. The story of Darkwatch has also been analyzed in literary sources through the scope of her character, both in the context of how her design juxtaposes against that of Cassidy but also Jericho in the context of their race as white characters in contrast to Tala, but also the story's depiction of the trio through the scope of Wild West Manifest Destiny.

== Appearances ==
Tala is a Native American woman in the 2005 video game Darkwatch. Set in the Wild West, Tala was born to a lineage of shamans able to communicate with animals, which led her to be ostracized by her tribe. Taken in by the undead hunting group Darkwatch, she secretly seeks power to get revenge against those that wronged her and her family. In-game, she works with another woman, Cassidy Sharp, to help the cowboy outlaw Jericho Cross, the game's playable character who was infected with vampirism by its antagonist, Lazarus. Tala is voiced by Rose McGowan, with Abby Craden providing additional voice work.

Cassidy is eventually killed and left as a ghost, while Tala seduces Jericho and is turned into a vampire by him. Tala betrays the group, leading to a confrontation with Lazarus. After Lazarus' defeat, the player can choose to side with either Tala or Cassidy, and will have to fight the other as the game's final boss. If Tala is defeated, she tells Jericho she would have loved him and dies, and his curse is lifted WHILE Cassidy's spirit departs to the afterlife. However, if the player sides with Tala, Jericho kills her after the battle and takes off to conquer the Wild West.

Tala also appears in the prequel comic Darkwatch: Innocence. Published in Heavy Metal magazine, it details the events leading up to the start of the game as Tala and Cassidy uncover Lazarus' coffin and attempt to capture the vampire. Another graphic novel focused on Tala was also in production, but was not released.

== Conception and design ==
Tala was designed by artist Steve Jung, who created a variety of outfit concepts for her vampire variation alone. After the designs were drawn, they chose to "distill and simplify to the purest design" as they felt simple and recognizable graphics worked best for video games. Additional promotional artwork of the character was created by Francis Tsai, meant to illustrated the game's gothic and mature themes. While Cassidy was designed to have a "no-nonsense, all-business" attitude, Tala's personality was meant to contrast against it, described as "playful, mischievous and brutally violent" as needed, while also willing to utilize her sex appeal and femininity to achieve her goals. When asked why the character was portrayed as evil in the game, the development team responded to the contrary, stating "She's not evil. She's just ambitious." While at one point it was considered to have Tala be a playable character, the developers were advised against doing so by their marketing team.

Tala is a tall woman with long black hair, large breasts, and a slender body. She wears a form-fitting leather outfit with open cleavage, a choker around her neck marked with a silver metal skull, and long clawed gloves with metal knuckles. Her pants have metal plates on her knees and boots, spurs on her boot ankles, and a holster around her hips holding a gun and a knife on her hips. Meanwhile, a feathered hair ornament dangles from the left side of her head. Tala's outfit was meant to resemble Cassidy's, but with a more aggressive appearance, while her eyes were intended to indicate a "dark, hidden agenda". As a vampire, Tala's eyes turn solid white, while her outfit changes entirely to a low cut bodice, a metal band around her right arm, grey leather pants with a demonic belt buckle, and bladed spurs on her feet. The boss version of her character was the easiest for the development team to design, with her body mostly naked and her hair covering her breasts, while large wings protrude from her back. They emphasized a separation between her upper and lower body in this form, and to this end had residue from the "membrane" of her transformation cling to her curves.

Her in-game animations were overseen by artists Sean Miller and particularly Sean Letts, with the pair using a mix of motion capture and manual animation work to try and capture "comic-book realism". Due to the character's motion capture actress performing beyond their expectations, Letts changed Tala's fighting style to utilize kicks and help differentiate her from other characters in the game who typically punched, expressing his appreciation for the "subtle nuance" that the motion capture work provided. He further worked with the actress to refine her portrayal and performance, and considered Tala not only the character he worked on the most for the project but his favorite in the game due to how she evolved as a villainess.

== Promotion and reception ==
To promote the game prior to its release, pinups of the character were featured in several publications, including IGN's Hotlist magazine, Play magazine's "Girls of Gaming" series, and Heavy Metal. She was also featured two issues of Playboy magazine as part of their "Gaming Grows Up" series of articles, and was the first video game character to appear fully nude for the publication. IGN released an "interview" with the character to coincide with her first appearance in the publication, with additional art provided by the developers. Darkwatch writer Paul O'Connor noted that while the promotions were controversial among some of the development team, they had an effect of "cutting through the noise" and brought more positive attention to the game.

Since her debut, the character has received praise for her sex appeal, with Rose McGowan also receiving praise for her performance in this regard. Video game developer Brenda Brathwaite in her book Sex in Video Games cited her as an example of how marketing teams purposefully created sexualized characters in order to capture the same impact others such as Lara Croft and Duke Nukem had on consumers. Joe McNeilly of GamesRadar+ described Tala as a "drastic improvement over the depiction of women Indian women" in early video gaming, praising her sexuality and driven nature. Meanwhile, game developer Elizabeth LaPensée described Tala as an "empowered and determined woman", and expressed a desire to play such a character as she found the concept engaging and felt there was a lack of strong Native American representation in gaming.

The subject of the character's appearance in Playboy proved somewhat controversial. While the staff of PSM magazine felt this could suggest gaming had penetrated more mature markets, writer Rebecca Onion for Bitch magazine argued it instead suggested if Tala was a real person, "all you would have to do to get them naked would be to give them some dough" and represented the notion that "any woman has a price". McNeilly, meanwhile, acknowledged that while the character's depiction as an object of "goth lust" could be seen as disrespectful, he argued that her presence in the magazine served to prove the impact the character had. LaPensée stated that while she supported characters appearing in pornographic material, she was dismayed that a marketing team felt the character was more suitable as promotional erotic material than as a playable character. She further felt such mindsets perpetuated a history of sexual violence towards Indigenous peoples.

While reactions varied towards Tala's sexualization in promotional material, others criticized how Cassidy, a white woman, was portrayed compared to Native American Tala, describing them embodying "two poles of the virgin-whore dichotomy".

Others drew more direct issue with the character's sexualization as a whole and were more critical. Author Michael Sheyahshe argued that the character's heavy sexualization served as negative representation in the gaming industry against Native Americans, and Game Developer writer Claire Bolton describing her as having "too many layers of prejudice in her design to bother counting them all". Meanwhile, author Krzysztof Ząbecki, in the book Handbook of the Changing World Language Map, cited her as an example of how video games often only use superficial aspects to illustrate Native American heritage for female video game characters, using them in a strict visual sense as "an element of both exoticism and eroticism that has to attract the player’s attention".

=== Analysis of racial themes ===
LaPensée further questioned the character's portrayal as a Native American femme fatale in contrast to Cassidy, a blonde white woman presented as the game's "good" influence, and how Tala's design was more sexually overt than the latter. The pair were also discussed by Beth A. Dillon in the book Professional Techniques for Video Game Writing, who used it as an example of the importance of taking into account a character's ethnicity and actions when writing them, as she felt it caused Darkwatch to express "a very apparent good vs. evil/white vs. Native simplification of the characters" through its side characters. University of Houston-Clear Lake associate professor of Writing and Rhetoric Christina V. Cedillo, in the book Undead in the West II, described the pair as embodying "two poles of the virgin–whore dichotomy" prevalent in the game, with the game emphasizing her attachment to Jericho as a pure, domesticated form of love compared to Tala's carnal magnetism.

Cedillo also contrasted Tala against Jericho, feeling that his defeat of her represented "the triumph of American white masculine individualism", emphasized by Tala's gendered taunts towards Jericho if fought which Cedillo felt encouraged the image of "the American male is on his own turf—and he will prevail." In this manner, Cedillo believed that Jericho's opposition towards Tala represented manifest destiny, with Cassidy representing a symbol of empire as "Great White Mother" in the racial context, encouraging a white man to conquer the Native American figure in Tala, who was "depicted as complicit in the act of sexual incursion." Cedillo observed that both Jericho and Cassidy were portrayed as "cerebral" characters, while, by contrast, Tala is not only shown as an aggressive seductress but also is the only character lacking a last name. Additionally she observed that while Tala's story illustrated her as more deserving of power, when she achieves it she strictly continues Lazarus' agenda. She compared this to Jericho's story, where he is able to choose his own destiny as either a free man or a conqueror. Elaborating further, Cedillo's stated that Tala's story "serves to locate Jericho as the central figure of settler teleology", and through her various traits, her character represented the philosophical concept of the Other, an outsider that "has no place in an order that strives for absolute organization and clear categorization".
