= Mark Bussler =

American filmmaker (born 1975)

- Born: 1975 (age 49–50)
- Occupations: Filmmaker; entrepreneur; writer; critic; comic artist; musician
- Years active: 1999-present

Mark Bussler (born 1975) is an American filmmaker, entrepreneur and multimedia artist, who is best known for creating the long-running gaming web series Classic Game Room.

== Biography ==
Bussler is the son of software entrepreneur Michael Bussler. He graduated from Shady Side Academy in 1994, and earned a business degree, with a concentration on marketing, from Bucknell University in 1998.

== Classic Game Room ==
Originally titled The Game Room and presented by Bussler and David Crosson, the video game review series launched on November 7, 1999, on the internet startup website FromUSAlive, part-owned by Michael. The pair had met at Pittsburgh Filmmakers School and shared a mutual love of movies and video games.

At first, Bussler and Crosson planned to review mainly then-modern games, but after a segment on older games proved to be popular, the show began reviewing earlier titles. However, the low-budget nature of the show led to slow episode production rates, and when revenue failed to cover the costs of running the show, The Game Room was canceled on October 23, 2000.

The show returned as Classic Game Room HD (HD standing for Heavy Duty according to Bussler) on February 20, 2008, hosted by Bussler. On November 2, 2015, Bussler announced that the show would highly slow its production following the end of 2015. Changes would include the shutting down of the show store and its secondary channel CGR Undertow entirely ending production. Bussler stated that this is due to a change in his life and he would like to focus more on his writing and filmmaking. He also said that he would continue the show as a hobby similar to how it began for him. Bussler later opened a Patreon for the series at the recommendation of fans in order to keep the series operating as normal, but would be renamed Classic Game Room Mark 3.

In February 2019, Bussler announced he would be moving away from games and video production in favor of writing and graphic design. The show was cancelled in April, with the Classic Game Room branding repurposed for Bussler's other ventures unrelated to video games. However, due to the success of the publishing and music business, Bussler was able to re-launch Classic Game Room as a series on YouTube in 2023.

== Work ==
After the initial closure of The Game Room, Bussler directed, wrote and produced multiple direct-to-DVD documentaries, usually on American history.

=== Films ===
- Civil War Minutes: Union (2001)
- Left for Dead (2002)
- Shot to Pieces (2002)
- The Johnstown Flood (2003)
- Gettysburg and Stories of Valor: Civil War Minutes III (2004)
- Expo: Magic of the White City (2005)
- Horses of Gettysburg (2006)
- World War 1: American Legacy (2006)
- Classic Game Room - The Rise and Fall of the Internet's Greatest Video Game Review Show (2007)
- Civil War Minutes: Confederate (2007)
- Westinghouse (2008)
- A Good Time at the 1939 New York World's Fair (2019)

=== Books ===
Bussler wrote tie-in non-fiction books to his documentaries such as Expo: Magic of the White City and Horses of Gettysburg, as well as video-game related projects such as The Ultra Massive Video Game Console Guide, How To Make A Video Game Review Show That Doesn't Suck and the CGR Collector's Series.

- Horses of Gettysburg - Published June 23, 2013
- Expo: Magic of the White City - Published July 2, 2013
- Westinghouse- The Life & Times of an American Icon - Published July 12, 2013
- Johnstown Flood - Published July 21, 2013
- CGR Collector's Series 001: Mario Bros. Review for Atari 7800 - Published April 10, 2017
- How To Make A Video Game Review Show That Doesn't Suck - Published April 20, 2017
- CGR Collector's Series 002: The Revenge of Shinobi Review for Sega Genesis - Published May 15, 2017
- Ultra Massive Video Game Console Guide Volume 1 - Published July 24, 2017
- Ultra Massive Video Game Console Guide Volume 2 - Published October 14, 2017
- Pac-Man Collector's Guide: A Definitive Review - Published October 29, 2017
- Why Nintendo is Brilliant: NES Classic Edition SNES Classic Edition Plus Review Guide - Published November 8, 2017
- Classic Game Room's Nintendo Switch Collector's Review Guide - Published November 12, 2017
- Lost Postcards of World War 1: Volume 1 - Published November 18, 2017
- The World's Fair of 1893: Ultra Massive Photographic Adventure - Published November 21, 2017
- The White City of Color: 1893 World's Fair - Published November 23, 2017
- Old Timey Pictures With Silly Captions: Volume 1 - Published November 30, 2017

=== Comics ===
In 2014, Bussler ran a successful Kickstarter campaign to fund a 76-page hard-cover and digital comic book titled Lord Karnage Book 1. Many of the Kickstarter reward tiers included access to digital downloads of various other Classic Game Room comic books featuring Wind Squid, Edit-Station 1 and Heyzoos the Coked Up Chicken, along with a "Deconstructed" version of Lord Karnage Book 1 containing rough sketches and background information.

In 2017, Bussler announced that another comic, Ethel The Cyborg Ninja, would be available on Amazon. Subsequently, he created a standalone comic of Heyzoos: The Coked Up Chicken, issues dubbed as 'Special Editions', as well as a compilation of old comic strips entitled RetroMegaTrex, and Surf Panda (Bussler's only comic intended for children).

- Ethel the Cyborg Ninja: Book 1 - Published January 16, 2017
- Lord Karnage Book 1 - Published January 28, 2015
- Heyzoos the Coked-Up Chicken #1 Special Edition - Published February 9, 2017
- Lord Karnage 1.5 Special Edition - Published May 18, 2017
- Retromegatrex Volume 1: The Lost Art of Mark Bussler 1995-2017 - Published May 18, 2017
- Heyzoos the Coked-Up Chicken #2 Special Edition - Published June 8, 2017
- Surf Panda #1 - Published June 8, 2017

=== Music ===
In 2022, Bussler began releasing albums of his own electronic music, under the moniker Turbo Volcano. This spun off into other albums and projects such as Omega Ronin, Robot Kitten Factory and Seatropica.
