= Narda Onyx =

Estonian-American actress

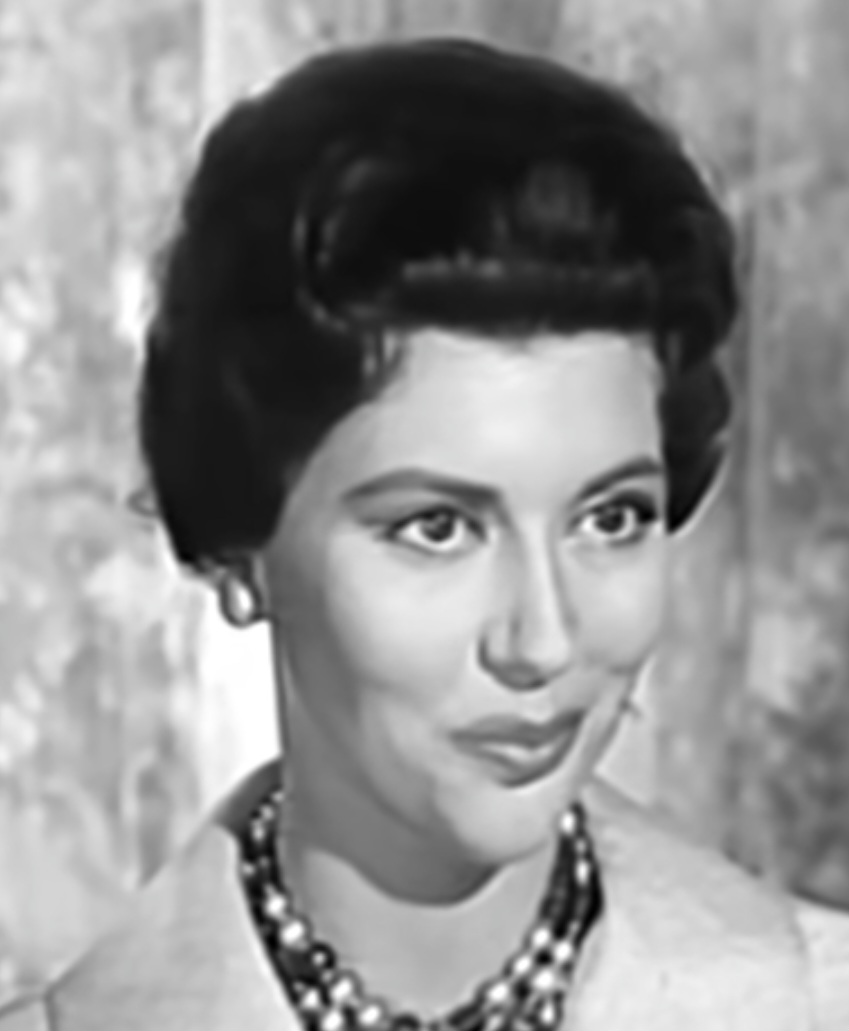
- Onyx in an episode of One Step Beyond (1959)
- Born: 20 December 1931; Estonia
- Died: 18 March 1991 (aged 59); Ventura, California, U.S.
- Occupation: Actress
- Years active: 1956–1966
- Spouse: George Virand

Narda Onyx (20 December 1931 – 18 March 1991) was an Estonian-born naturalized American film and television actress.

== Biography ==
At the age of eleven, Onyx escaped along with her family (her grandparents, mother, and two-year-old brother) through Soviet lines and deceived her would-be German captors near the end of World War II. The Onyx family made their way to the American occupation forces at Bonn, Germany, and sought refuge with the Swedish Red Cross. She and her mother worked as waitresses for the American forces.

Later the family moved to Sweden, where Narda resumed her acting career. She travelled to England, where she worked for the Old Vic Company.

She moved to Canada in 1951, received a US work permit in 1954, and then received a US residency permit in 1956.

She appeared in dozens of supporting roles on television and in motion pictures during the 1950s and 1960s. Shows in which she appeared include The Beverly Hillbillies, Have Gun – Will Travel, and The Man from U.N.C.L.E. In addition, she played Gretl Braun in Hitler (1962) and Maria Frankenstein in Jesse James Meets Frankenstein's Daughter (1966).

In 1964, she authored a biography of Johnny Weissmuller titled Water, World & Weissmuller. In addition to Estonian, Onyx spoke English, Swedish, Finnish, and German.

== Personal life ==
On 20 October 1961, she became an American citizen. While in Canada she met and married George Virand, also an Estonian refuge, and they moved to Hollywood.
