= Expo: Magic of the White City =

- DVD Cover
- Directed by: Mark Bussler
- Written by: Brian Connelly
- Produced by: Mark Bussler
- Narrated by: Gene Wilder
- Edited by: Mark Bussler
- Production company: Inecom Entertainment Company
- Distributed by: Inecom Entertainment Company (formerly); Janson Media
- Release date: September 13, 2005
- Running time: 116 minutes
- Country: United States
- Language: English

Expo: Magic of the White City is a 2005 American direct-to-video historical documentary film directed and produced by Mark Bussler, and narrated by Gene Wilder. The documentary tells the story of Chicago's World's Columbian Exposition in 1893. It marked Wilder's last film project before his death in 2016.

== Synopsis ==
It begins by explaining Frederick Law Olmsted's planning of the fair and the architecture by Daniel Burnham. It also details exhibits by many people, including George Westinghouse, Nikola Tesla and Thomas Edison. In addition to detailing the fair itself, the documentary also describes the Midway Plaisance. Features of the Midway included bellydancing, side-shows, saloons, and a large Ferris wheel. Finally Expo: Magic of the White City discusses the aftermath of the fair and the legacy it left.

== Cast ==
- Gene Wilder as the Narrator

== Release ==
It was released to DVD in September 13, 2005. Janson Media later acquired the copyright to the film in 2010.

=== DVD special features ===
- Commentary tracks by Mark Bussler, Brian Connelly and David Cope (World's Fair Historian)
- Featurettes ("Making the Fair", "Art of the Fair", "Storyboards of the Fair", "Pictures of the Fair")
- Deleted scenes
