= Billy the Kid Versus Dracula =

1966 film

- Theatrical release poster
- Directed by: William Beaudine
- Screenplay by: Carl K. Hittleman
- Story by: Carl K. Hittleman
- Based on: Life of Billy the Kid; Count Dracula by Bram Stoker
- Produced by: Carroll Case
- Starring: Chuck Courtney; John Carradine; Melinda Plowman; Virginia Christine
- Cinematography: Lothrop Worth
- Edited by: Roy V. Livingston
- Music by: Raoul Kraushaar
- Color process: Pathécolor
- Production company: Circle Productions
- Distributed by: Embassy Pictures
- Release date: April 10, 1966
- Running time: 74 minutes
- Country: United States
- Language: English

Billy the Kid Versus Dracula is a 1966 American horror Western film directed by William Beaudine. It stars Chuck Courtney and John Carradine. The film is about Billy the Kid trying to save his fiancée from Dracula.

The film was originally released as part of a double feature along with Jesse James Meets Frankenstein's Daughter in 1966. Both films were shot in eight days at Corriganville Movie Ranch and Paramount Studios in mid-1965; both were the final feature films of director Beaudine. The films were produced by television producer Carroll Case for Joseph E. Levine.

The film was considered by Carradine as his least favorite that he ever acted in.

== Plot ==
The film centers on Dracula's plot to convert Billy the Kid's fiancé, Betty Bentley, into his vampire bride. Dracula impersonates Betty's deceased uncle, calling himself "Mr. Underhill", and schemes to make her his vampire bride. A German immigrant couple comes to work for her and warns Betty that her "uncle" is a vampire. While Betty does not believe them, their concerns confirm Billy's suspicions that something is not quite right with Betty's uncle.

Eventually, the Count kidnaps Betty and takes her to an abandoned silver mine. Billy confronts the Count, but soon finds that bullets are no match for a vampire. The Count subdues the notorious outlaw and sets out to transform Betty into his vampire bride. Just then, the town sheriff and a country doctor arrive. The doctor hands Billy a silver scalpel, telling him he must drive it through the vampire's heart. Billy throws his gun at the vampire and knocks him senseless, making him easy pickings for a staking. With the Count destroyed, Betty is saved and Billy takes her away, presumably to live happily ever after.

== Cast ==
- Chuck Courtney as William "Billy the Kid" Bonney
- John Carradine as Count Dracula/James Underhill
- Melinda Plowman as Elizabeth (Betty) Bentley
- Virginia Christine as Eva Oster
- Walter Janovitz as Franz Oster
- Bing Russell as Dan "Red" Thorpe
- Olive Carey as Dr. Henrietta Hull
- Roy Barcroft as Sheriff Griffin
- Hannie Landman as Lisa Oster
- Richard Reeves as Pete (saloon keeper)
- Marjorie Bennett as Mary Ann Bentley
- William Forrest as James Underhill
- George Cisar as Joe Flake
- Harry Carey, Jr. as Ben Dooley (wagon master)
- Leonard P. Geer as Yancy (credited as Lennie Geer)
- William Challee as Tim (station agent)

== Production ==
The film was announced for production as early as June 22, 1965, in Daily Variety announcing both Billy the Kid Versus Dracula and Jesse James Meets Frankenstein's Daughter. Principal photography began on June 22, 1965. Both films were the last features directed by William Beaudine, Sr. Beaudine spent the rest of his career after these films by filming television. The film was completed on July 9, 1965, and was completed with a budget surplus of $25,000. Each of the two features was shot in eight days in California's Red Rock Canyon, Corrigan Ranch, and Paramount Studios. According to the assistant to the producer Howard W. Koch, Jr., they "were made as cheap as movies can be made."

== Release and reception ==
According to the American Film Institute, an official release date of the film is not confirmed. The film was shown as early as March 30, 1966, in New Haven, Connecticut. Box-office reports in the September 28, 1966, issue of Variety stated that it was featured on a double bill that month as a reissue in St. Louis, Missouri.

=== Critical response ===
The film was widely ignored upon release. Review aggregator Rotten Tomatoes has 2 critics reviews, both negative.

== Legacy ==
John Carradine later spoke on the film, "I have worked in a dozen of the greatest, and I have worked in a dozen of the worst. I only regret Billy the Kid Versus Dracula. Otherwise, I regret nothing." And again: "My worst film? That's easy, a thing called Billy the Kid Versus Dracula...It was a bad film. I don't even remember it. I was absolutely numb!" Critic and historian Tom Weaver stated that the film could have earned "the semirespectability" of Curse of the Undead, another vampire-themed Western "if it [were] truer to vampire lore, if it didn't feature a 'name' outlaw like Billy the Kid, if the vampire in it weren't Dracula, and if Carradine's performance [were] much better. (That's a lot of ifs.)"

== See also ==
- List of horror films of 1966
- Vampire film
- Weird West
