= Charles G. Finney =

American fantasy writer (1905–1984)

- Born: Charles Grandison Finney; December 1, 1905; Sedalia, Missouri, U.S.
- Died: April 16, 1984 (aged 78); Pima, Arizona, U.S.
- Occupation: Writer
- Writing career
- Genre: Fantasy

Charles Grandison Finney (December 1, 1905 – April 16, 1984) was an American news editor and fantasy novelist, the great-grandson of evangelist Charles Grandison Finney. His first novel and most famous work, The Circus of Dr. Lao, won one of the inaugural National Book Awards: the Most Original Book of 1935.

== Biography ==
Finney was born in Sedalia, Missouri, and served in Tientsin, China, with the U.S. Army 15th Infantry Regiment (E Company) from 1927 to 1929.

In his memoirs, he notes that The Circus of Dr. Lao was conceived in Tientsin during 1929. After the Army, he moved to Tucson, Arizona. He worked as an editor for the Arizona Daily Star in Tucson, Arizona from 1930 to 1970.

Some of Finney's papers, with correspondence and photographs, are collected at the University of Arizona Main Library Special Collections, Collection Number: AZ 024, Papers of Charles G. Finney, 1959-1966. The archive includes typed manuscripts of "A Sermon at Casa Grande", "Isabelle the Inscrutable", "Murder with Feathers", "The Night Crawler", "Private Prince", "An Anabasis in Minor Key", "The Old China Hands", and "The Ghosts of Manacle".

== Influence ==
Finney's work, especially The Circus of Dr. Lao, has been influential on subsequent writers of fantasy. Ray Bradbury admired the novel and anthologized it in The Circus of Dr. Lao and Other Improbable Stories; Bradbury's Something Wicked This Way Comes shares with Dr. Lao the setting of a supernatural circus. Arthur Calder-Marshall's The Fair to Middling (1959), Tom Reamy's Blind Voices (1978), Peter S. Beagle's The Last Unicorn (1968) and Jonathan Lethem's Chronic City (2009) were all influenced by Finney's work.

It was adapted to film as 7 Faces of Dr. Lao.

== Selected works ==
=== Books ===
- The Circus of Dr. Lao (1935)
- The Unholy City (1937)
- Past the End of the Pavement (1939), collection
- The Ghosts of Manacle (1964), collection
- The Old China Hands (1961), memoir of service with the Army 15th Infantry in Tientsin, China
- The Magician Out of Manchuria (1968)

=== Short stories ===
- "The Iowan's Curse", Harper's Magazine, July 1958
- "The Life and Death of a Western Gladiator", Harper's Magazine, October 1958
- "The Gilashrikes", The Magazine of Fantasy & Science Fiction, October 1959
- "The Night Crawler", The New Yorker, December 5, 1959
- "An Anabasis in Minor Key", The New Yorker, March 26, 1960
- "Private Prince", The New Yorker, June 24, 1961
- "A Sermon at Casa Grande", Point West, September 1963
- "Isabelle the Inscrutable", Harper's Magazine, 228:1367 (April 1964) pp. 51–58
- "Murder with Feathers", Harper's Magazine 232:1391 (April 1966) pp. 112–13

=== Play ===
- Project Number Six (1962)
