= The Circus of Dr. Lao =

1935 novel by Charles G. Finney

- Front cover of first edition
- Author: Charles G. Finney
- Illustrator: Boris Artzybasheff
- Language: English
- Genre: Fantasy; Weird West
- Published: 1935 Viking Press
- Publication place: United States
- Media type: Print (hardcover)
- Pages: 154 pp.

The Circus of Dr. Lao (1935) is a novel written by the American newspaperman and writer Charles G. Finney. It won one of the inaugural National Book Awards: The Most Original Book of 1935. Although the first edition was illustrated by Boris Artzybasheff, many later editions omit the illustrations.

The paperback edition of 1974 received a positive review in The New York Times, which called the book a "classic American joke", comparing it to the likes of Mark Twain, Ambrose Bierce and H. L. Mencken.

The Circus of Dr. Lao was re-issued in 2016 as part of the Fantasy Masterworks series. The 2016 edition was reviewed in Starburst, which called it "an experience you shouldn't miss and a trip into the dark heart of a Big Top you will never forget". The review also pointed out the influence of Dr. Lao on Ray Bradbury's Something Wicked This Way Comes.

A contemporary reviewer in Kirkus Reviews was positive, writing, "It's crazy – but I liked it. It's astoundingly learned – but not annoyingly so."

== Plot summary ==
The novel is set in the fictional town of Abalone, Arizona. A circus owned by a Chinese man named Dr. Lao pulls into town one day, carrying legendary creatures from all areas of mythology and legend, among them a sea serpent, Apollonius of Tyana (who tells dark, yet always truthful, fortunes), a medusa, and a satyr. Through interactions with the circus, the locals attain various enigmatic peak experiences appropriate to each circus patron's personality.

The tale ends with the town becoming the site of a ritual to a pagan god whimsically given the name Yottle (possibly an allusion to the Mesoamerican god Yaotl, whose name means "the enemy"). The ritual ends when the god himself slays a virgin, her unrequited lover, and his own priest. The circus over, the townsfolk scatter to the winds. Apparently few of them profit from their surreal experiences.

The book's appendix is a "catalogue" of all the people, places, items, and mythological beings mentioned in the novel, summing up the characters pithily and sardonically, revealing the various fates of the townsfolk, and listing a number of plot holes and unanswered questions not addressed in the narrative.

List of Dr. Lao's exhibited creatures and persons:

- Satyr: 2,300 years old, he was captured in Tu-jeng, China, near the Great Wall. He was born of the union of a goatherd and one of his goats.
- Medusa: She is very young and wears very little clothing. She has many species of snakes in her hair, of which three are mentioned: Tantillas, brown with a black ring around their neck; night snakes, gray with black spots; and faded snakes (Arizona elegans). She is a Sonoran medusa from northern Mexico.
- Roc chick, "Really not as big as Sinbad thought it was, but plenty big enough to do all that he said it did." It hatches from an egg that sweats salt water.
- Hound of the hedges: Created when water touched a dry rice field for the first time in many years. His tail is made of ferns; his fur is green grass; instead of teeth he has rose thorns; his blood and saliva are chlorophyll.
- Mermaid: She was captured in the Gulf of Pei-Chihli the same day as the sea serpent. Her tail is sea-green and sleek scaled; her tail fin is as pink as a trout's. Her hair is seaweed green; her human half is young and slender with slight breasts.
- Sphinx: A hermaphroditic, African sphinx. Its head is blunt nosed and womanlike; it has breasts like a woman.
- Chimera: The chimera is male, unlike the chimera of Greek myth, thus its body is different. Although it has a lion's body and a snake's tail, it has eagle's wings and a metal barb at the end of its tail with which it can strike like a scorpion. (It seems that Finney describes something closer to a manticore.)
- Sea serpent: He is 80 feet long and dark gray; his tongue is as thick as a man's arm and bright yellow. His eyes are bronze with black slits for pupils. His tail is paddle shaped like a sea snake's. The Sea Serpent is the only animal that did not become tame after being captured. He plans to escape with the mermaid and return to the sea.
- Werewolf: She starts her transformation as a large gray wolf. ("Not the American lobo. Probably some species from the Carpathians or Urals.") When she transforms, she changes into an old woman, not the young lady the men are expecting.
- Unicorn: Has a metal "horn".
- Golden Ass: Lucius Apuleius, who turned into an ass "with the help of Fotis".

== Film adaptation ==
The novel was later adapted by Charles Beaumont into the script for an effects-filled 1964 movie The 7 Faces of Dr. Lao. The film features a great deal of stop-motion animation which was produced by George Pal.

The movie follows Finney's book only vaguely, abridges and changes many of the circus' exhibited creatures and persons, and inserts a subplot about how the town miser – played by Arthur O'Connell – plots to dupe townspeople into selling him their land, as he knows a railroad will soon come to the town.

Each of the "7 faces" is portrayed by actor Tony Randall: He appears as Dr. Lao, who alternates between speaking in stereotypical Chinese broken English and a solemn deep voice and a mastery of English, using several different accents. Randall also plays Medusa; Pan; the Abominable Snowman; Apollonius of Tyana (who serves as the sideshow fortune teller and who is cursed with being unable to shield people from unhappy truths); the magician Merlin (who is so old and fumbling that the obtuse audience does not realize he performs actual miracles, when not performing clumsy sleight of hand); and the faces of a stop-motion serpent that changes its appearance, depending on who looks at it. Finally, Randall portrays a circus patron who appears once in a crowd scene.

== Sources ==
- Bleiler, E.F. (1948). The Checklist of Fantastic Literature. Chicago, IL: Shasta Publishers. p. 115.
