= Jesse James Meets Frankenstein's Daughter =

1966 film directed by William Beaudine

- Theatrical release poster
- Directed by: William Beaudine
- Written by: Carl K. Hittleman
- Produced by: Caroll Case
- Starring: John Lupton; Narda Onyx; Estelita Rodriguez; Cal Bolder; Jim Davis
- Cinematography: Lothrop B. Worth
- Edited by: William Austin
- Music by: Raoul Kraushaar
- Distributed by: Embassy Pictures
- Release date: April 10, 1966
- Running time: 83 minutes
- Country: United States
- Language: English

Jesse James Meets Frankenstein's Daughter is a low-budget horror Western film released in 1966, in which a fictionalized version of the real-life western outlaw Jesse James encounters the fictional granddaughter (the film's title notwithstanding) of the famous Dr. Frankenstein. The film was originally released as part of a double feature along with Billy the Kid Versus Dracula in 1966. Both films were shot in eight days at Corriganville Movie Ranch and at Paramount Studios in mid-1965; both were the final feature films of director William Beaudine. The films were produced by television producer Carroll Case for Joseph E. Levine.

== Plot ==
Sometime in the early 1880s, Dr Frankenstein's evil granddaughter Maria has moved to the American West with her brother Rudolph, in order to use the prairie lightning storms in her experiments on immigrant children snatched from a dying town. Maria is very much in charge, killing the children and replacing their brains with artificial ones, intending to revive them as her slaves. Rudolph, however, is reluctant to help his sister, but is too afraid of her to do otherwise. After a number of failures (owing to Rudolph secretly poisoning the victims as soon as his sister revives them), they are finding it increasingly difficult to hide the trail of bodies. Down the road, Mañuel Lopez and his wife Nina decide to leave town with their daughter Juanita because of the frequent disappearances, the latest of which is that of their son.

Two gunslingers come to town, Jesse James, the infamous outlaw, who has actually survived his reported killing on April 3, 1882, and Hank Tracy, a dimwitted brute that Jesse uses as his henchman. Meeting up with Butch Curry, the head of a local gang called The Wild Bunch, they join up with the intention of stealing $100,000 from the next stagecoach. However, a member of the gang, Butch's own brother Lonny, decides to go to the sheriff and let him know about the plot in exchange for becoming his deputy and claiming the reward for James' capture. As the robbery begins, the sheriff and his men shoot the two remaining members of the Wild Bunch and seriously wound Hank.

Jesse and Hank escape and stop at the Lopez's campout to tend to Hank's wound and sleep until the morning. During the middle of the night, Juanita wakes up Jesse and Hank and leads them back to town to the Frankensteins' house to fix up Hank despite her parents forbidding her to go back there. Maria agrees to help, and even covers for her guests when the sheriff and Lonny come around looking for them, but her actual plan is to use Hank as another one of her experiments. After a failed attempt to seduce Jesse, Maria sends him to the town pharmacist with a note, then begins operating on Hank, giving him an artificial new brain and bringing him back to life. Rudolph tries to poison Hank, now called Igor, but Maria catches him this time and orders her new monster to strangle her brother.

Jesse gives the pharmacist the note from Maria, which actually reveals his identity, prompting the pharmacist to call the sheriff. The sheriff is out, but his deputy Lonny decides to take on Jesse for the reward on his head. Jesse manages to escape, killing Lonny in the process. When he returns to the Frankensteins' house, Igor incapacitates him and ties him up.

Realizing Jesse is in trouble, Juanita sends the sheriff to the house, where he finds Jesse and prepares to take him in. But Maria sends Igor to crush the sheriff. During the scuffle, Juanita frees Jesse and tries to escape. Maria orders Igor to go kill Juanita, but he strangles Maria instead and goes after Jesse. Juanita gets the sheriff's gun and kills Igor.

The next morning, as Jesse buries Hank, Juanita pleads with him to stay and live with her, but Jesse, knowing that he is a fugitive, cannot risk endangering her and so rides off into the sunset.

== Cast ==
- John Lupton as Jesse James
- Narda Onyx as Dr. Maria Frankenstein
- Estelita Rodriguez as Juanita Lopez
- Cal Bolder as Hank Tracy / Igor
- Jim Davis as Marshal MacPhee
- Steven Geray as Dr. Rudolph Frankenstein
- Rayford Barnes as Lonny Curry
- William Fawcett as Jensen, the pharmacist
- Nestor Paiva as Saloon Owner
- Roger Creed as Butch Curry
- Rosa Turich as Nina Lopez
- Felipe Turich as Manuel Lopez
- Fred Stromsoe as Stacy
- Dan White as Pete Ketchum
- Page Slattery as Deputy Andy
- Mark Norton as Francisco Lopez

== Legacy ==
Leonard Maltin later rated the film one and a half star out of four, calling it "Low-budget nonsense . . . "

In the webcomic 20020, Juice claims this is his favorite movie. When pressed on it, he claims that "he has never seen it, it's just his favorite movie."
