= 7 Faces of Dr. Lao =

1964 film

- Theatrical release poster by Joseph Smith
- Directed by: George Pal
- Screenplay by: Charles Beaumont; Ben Hecht
- Based on: The Circus of Dr. Lao; 1935 novel by Charles G. Finney
- Produced by: George Pal
- Starring: Tony Randall; Arthur O'Connell; Barbara Eden; John Ericson; Noah Beery Jr.
- Cinematography: Robert J. Bronner
- Edited by: George Tomasini
- Music by: Leigh Harline
- Production companies: Metro-Goldwyn-Mayer; Galaxy Productions; Scarus, Inc.
- Distributed by: Metro-Goldwyn-Mayer
- Release date: March 18, 1964
- Running time: 100 minutes
- Country: United States
- Language: English
- Box office: $1.25 million (US/ Canada)

7 Faces of Dr. Lao is a 1964 American Metrocolor Western fantasy-comedy film directed by George Pal (his final directorial effort) and starring Tony Randall. The film, an adaptation by screenwriters Charles Beaumont and Ben Hecht of Charles G. Finney's 1935 novel The Circus of Dr. Lao, details the visit of a magical circus to a small town in the southwestern United States and its effects on the townspeople.

== Plot ==
Dr. Lao rides a golden donkey (implied to be The Golden Ass of Apuleius) into the small town of Abalone, Arizona and visits Edward Cunningham's newspaper to place a large advertisement for his traveling circus, which will play for two nights only. Although quiet, Abalone is not peaceful. Wealthy rancher Clinton Stark has inside information that a railroad is coming to town and plans to buy the entire town while the land is cheap. Stark arrives at the newspaper offices to confront Cunningham about a recent editorial opposing Stark's plan. Lao, waiting to place his ad, silently listens to the meeting.

Another of Stark's opponents is Angela Benedict, a widow librarian and schoolteacher. Cunningham displays affection for her, embarrassing her in a visit to the library to research Lao's background, but she suppresses her reciprocal feelings.

At a town hall meeting, Stark announces that the town's 16-mile-long water-supply pipe is decaying, and as a replacement would be prohibitively expensive, he offers to buy the entire town. Arguing against the offer, Cunningham introduces George G. George, a Navajo Indian who lives nearby in a town whose residents depend on Abalone's existence. Stark reluctantly allows the townspeople to ponder their choice until the next Friday night.

The next day, Cunningham confronts Lao at the circus site, arguing that Lao's hometown vanished centuries earlier. The mysterious Lao eloquently deflects Cunningham's questions, only for Cunningham to realize Lao's "pidgin" English is a chosen affectation. Lao explains he employs "whatever dialect the mood requires", along with various accents including Scottish and Southern. Later, Angela's young son Mike learns that Lao is 7,321 years old. When the circus opens, Lao uses his many faces to offer his wisdom, including those of Pan (the god of joy), the Great Serpent, Medusa and the magician Merlin.

Mike visits Lao seeking a job, displaying his novice juggling and conjuring skills. Lao instead offers observations via a poetic speech about the world, and life, as a circus. Meanwhile, Stark's henchmen Casey and Lucas infiltrate and destroy the newspaper office. Angela is kept awake that night, plagued by the music that Pan played while no one else could hear it.

At dawn, the newspaper staff members are astonished to discover that their office has been fully restored with the press operating. Attributing it to Lao, they rush to produce a short edition of the paper, which Cunningham delivers to Stark in the morning. When he visits the circus site, Lao offers encouragement and calls on Cunningham to keep faith.

That evening, Lao stages his grand finale, a magic lantern show depicting the story of a once-happy kingdom of Woldercan, destroyed by the pettiness and greed of its inhabitants. The Abalone townspeople are initially delighted to see themselves represented in the vision, then chastened as it progresses toward the end of the mythical civilization in explosions and darkness. Finding themselves again in the library in a town meeting, they call for a vote on Stark's proposal, which is unanimously rejected, surprising Cunningham, Benedict and Stark. Stark tells everyone about the coming railroad and Angela confesses her love to Cunningham.

Confused by his apparent change of character, Stark's henchmen trash Lao's circus in a drunken spree. When they break Lao's fishbowl, the fish inside it is revealed as the Loch Ness Monster, which balloons to enormous size if exposed to open air. After it chases the thugs away, Lao conjures rain to drench the monster and shrink it to its original size.

When morning comes, the circus has moved on, with only a red circle on the desert floor where the tent had been. Mike's reports of the previous night are initially disbelieved, but Stark finds the hat belonging to one of the henchmen. Chasing a dust plume that seemingly represents the spirit of Lao, Mike stops to find three wooden balls, seemingly left for him, which he juggles expertly while summoning Lao's spirit to observe.

Lao rides away as his advice from two nights earlier is repeated, reminding Mike that life itself is a circus, and everything within it is a wonder.

== Cast ==
- Tony Randall as Dr. Lao, the Mysterious Visitor
  - as Merlin, the Great Magician
  - as Pan, the God of Joy
  - as the Great Serpent
  - as Medusa, the Fabled Monster
  - as Apollonius of Tyana, the blind fortune teller
  - as the Abominable Snowman
- Arthur O'Connell as Clint Stark, the Ruthless Tycoon
- John Ericson as Ed Cunningham, the Crusading Publisher and the Transformed Pan
- Barbara Eden as Angela Benedict, the Widowed Librarian
- Kevin Tate as Mike Benedict, Angela's son
- Noah Beery, Jr. as Sam, the Loyal Pressman
- Royal Dano as Casey, the Brutal Henchman
- John Doucette as Lucas, the Henchman's Sidekick
- Lee Patrick as Mrs. Howard T. Cassan, the Stuffy Matron
- Minerva Urecal as Kate Lindquist, the Shrewish Wife
- John Qualen as Luther Lindquist, the Meek Husband
- Frank Cady as Mayor James Sargent
- Eddie Little Sky as George G. George, the Friendly Indian
- Frank Kreig as Peter Ramsey, the Jolly Townsman
- Peggy Rea as Bunny (Mrs. Peter) Ramsey, the Jolly Wife
- Argentina Brunetti as Sarah Benedict, Angela's loving Mother-in Law
- Dallas McKennon as Lean Cowboy
- Chubby Johnson as Fat Cowboy
- Douglas Fowley as Toothless Cowboy
- Bess Flowers as Spectator at Medusa Presentation (uncredited)
- George J. Lewis as Mr. Frisco (uncredited)

Randall voices the Serpent, a stop-motion animated snake with the face of O'Connell. While Randall is also credited as the Abominable Snowman, bodybuilder Péter Pál (son of the film's director) was the uncredited body double. Randall also appears with his own face as a silent audience member.

== Production ==
The original novel was published in 1934. Film rights were bought by George Pal, who in April 1961 said that Charles Beaumont was writing a script. "He has a kooky mind like mine," said Pal.

In September 1961, Pal said that Laurence Harvey would star. In December 1961, Terry-Thomas was linked to the project. In June 1962, Metro-Goldwyn-Mayer announced that Rod Taylor would star in the film.

According to notes on the Leigh Harline soundtrack CD released by Film Score Monthly, Pal's first choice for the role of Dr. Lao was Peter Sellers, who was strongly interested. However, MGM had Tony Randall under contract and wanted to use him; he was $50,000 cheaper. In June 1963, it was announced that Randall would play the lead.

Filming began on July 15, 1963.

The "Woldercan spectacular" that Dr. Lao presents as the grand finale of his circus contains much footage from an earlier George Pal production, 1961's Atlantis, the Lost Continent, as well as some footage of flowing lava from The Time Machine and stock footage of destruction from MGM's 1951 production of Quo Vadis. The crystal ball and large hourglass used by the Wicked Witch of the West in 1939's The Wizard of Oz can be seen in the film. In the scene in which Mike visits Lao at night, a two-headed tortoise can be seen that would later appear in several episodes of The Addams Family.

In January, 1965 MGM announced that Randall would return as Dr. Lao in a sequel, but it did not materialize.

== Reception ==
7 Faces of Dr. Lao garnered positive reception from multiple movie critics. Rotten Tomatoes, a review aggregator, reports that five of six surveyed critics gave the film a positive review; the average rating is 86%. Howard Thompson of The New York Times called the film "heavy, thick, pint-sized fantasy, laid on with an anvil."

=== Box office ===
In 1974, Pal said 7 Faces of Dr. Lao was the only of his films to lose money at the box office, although it had since recouped its cost through television broadcast rights.

== Awards ==
William Tuttle received an honorary Academy Award for his makeup work. It was the first of only two honorary Oscars awarded for makeup; the other went to John Chambers in 1968 for Planet of the Apes. Randall's head was shaved, not only to play the bald Dr. Lao but also to facilitate the many costume and makeup changes.

Jim Danforth's model animation of the Loch Ness Monster, the Giant Serpent and Medusa's snake hair were nominated for an Academy Award.

== Home media ==
7 Faces of Dr. Lao was originally released on a two-sided Region 1 DVD in 2000.

== See also ==
- Magical other
- Pan in popular culture
- Portrayal of East Asians in American film and theater
