= The Dillinger Dossier =

1983 book by Jay Robert Nash

- Author: Jay Robert Nash
- Language: English
- Genre: Non-fiction
- Publisher: December Press
- Publication date: 1983
- ISBN: 978-0913204160

The Dillinger Dossier is a book written by Jay Robert Nash. The book is based on police records and observes the events of July 22, 1934 as being a shooting that resulted in the fatal wounding of a double of John Dillinger. The book was published in 1983 by December Press, and involved an expansion and update of Nash's earlier book Dillinger: Dead or Alive.

== Nash's theory of Dillinger's escape ==
In The Dillinger Dossier, author Jay Robert Nash maintains that Dillinger escaped death at the Biograph Theater simply by not being there. In his stead was a "Jimmy Lawrence", a local Chicago petty criminal whose appearance was similar to Dillinger's. Nash uses evidence to show that East Chicago Indiana Police officer Martin Zarkovich was instrumental in this plot. Nash theorizes that the plot unraveled when the body was found to have fingerprints that didn't match Dillinger's (the fingerprint card was missing from the Cook County Morgue for over three decades), it was too tall, the eye color was wrong, and it possessed a rheumatic heart. The F.B.I., a relatively new agency whose agents were only recently permitted to carry guns or make arrests, would have fallen under heavy scrutiny, this being the third innocent man killed in pursuit of Dillinger, and would have gone to great lengths to ensure a cover up.

In shooting the Dillinger stand in, F.B.I. agents were stationed on the roof of the theater and fired downward, causing the open cuts on the face which were described through the media as "scars resulting from inept plastic surgery". The first words from Dillinger's father upon identifying the body were, "that's not my boy." The body was buried under five feet of concrete and steel, making exhumation less likely. Nash produced fingerprints and photos of Dillinger as he would appear in 1960 that were allegedly sent to Melvin Purvis just prior to his 1960 alleged suicide (more probably an accident). Nash alleged Dillinger was living and working in California as a machinist, under what would have been an early form of the witness protection program.

== Challenging Nash's theory ==
- Dillinger did indeed have a heart condition according to Dr. Patrick H. Weeks, a physician and psychiatrist at the Indiana State Prison in Michigan City during the time of Dillinger's incarceration at the facility. In his 1938 book, The Big House of Mystery, he writes, "During his term at the Indiana prison I was well acquainted with Dillinger, but came rarely into contact with him in my professional capacity. The lad from Mooresville was not a hospital pest; that is, he was not one of those prisoners who needs medical treatment upon the slightest provocation whatsoever. I examined him two or three times, however, and discovered something about his physical condition which is quite surprising and which, incidentally, was never revealed in the press. John Dillinger suffered from heart disease. He had a distinct heart lesion. The disease was organic. I told Dillinger that he should never subject himself to great mental or physical strain, because it might hasten his death. I was confident that he would follow my advice."
- Dillinger's father initially couldn't believe the dead man he was looking at was his son. Neither could his sister, Audrey, when first seeing the body. It should be remembered that Dillinger underwent plastic surgery in late May and early June, including fingerprint removal/alteration, just a month and a half before his death. Audrey was finally convinced when E.F. Harvey of the Harvey Funeral Home asked her to locate the scar on the back of Dillinger's thigh, a souvenir of an encounter with a barbed-wire fence years prior during a watermelon raid.
- Dillinger's father was offered $10,000 by H.G. Cross of Wapun, Wisconsin, for use of the body to display for profit. It was due to offers such as these that the coffin was encased in concrete—to prevent ghouls from grave robbing—not because the casket contained a doppelgänger by the name of Jimmy Lawrence, as Nash suggests.
