= Ana Cumpănaș =

Romanian prostitute and madam (1889–1947)

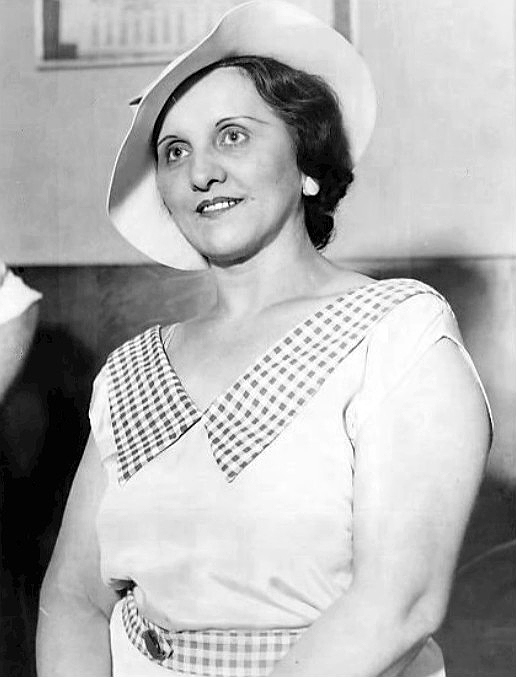
- Cumpănaș in 1934
- Born: 1889; Nagykomlós, Austria-Hungary (now Comloșu Mare, Romania)
- Died: April 25, 1947 (aged 58); Timișoara, Kingdom of Romania
- Other names: Anna Sage; Woman in Red
- Occupations: Prostitute (Rumoured), brothel owner
- Spouses: Michael Chiolak (m. 1909, divorced) Alexandru Suciu (m. 1932; div. 1932)

Ana Cumpănaș (1889 – April 25, 1947), also known as Anna Sage, Anna Suciu, and nicknamed the Woman in Red, was a Romanian prostitute and madam who was active in the American cities of Chicago and Gary, Indiana. She is best known for having assisted the Federal Bureau of Investigation in tracking down gangster John Dillinger.

== Biography ==
Cumpănaș was a native of Comloșu Mare, a village in the Banat region of Austria-Hungary, in what is now Romania. She married Michael Chiolak in 1909, and the couple moved to the United States either the same year, in 1914, or in 1919, settling in East Chicago, Indiana. They had a son, Steve Chiolak, in 1911, but their marriage did not last. By the end of the decade, Cumpănaș worked as a prostitute, and later became a madam. Her first brothel was in East Chicago, and in 1923, she opened a second one in Gary.

Cumpănaș married attorney Alexandru Suciu, and the couple used Sage as their surname (this was an anglicization of Suciu, reputedly preferred by Immigration and Naturalization Service officials). In 1923 or 1924, Cumpănaș-Sage traveled to Romania and visited her mother, returning on board the RMS Majestic. Friction between her husband and her son led to the breakup of the marriage, and Cumpănaș left Alexandru in 1932. A year later, she opened a brothel on Halsted Street in Chicago. By 1934, Cumpănaș was facing deportation to Romania, after the authorities deemed her to be an "alien of low moral character".

On July 4, 1934, John Dillinger began frequenting Cumpănaș and her circle of friends. Cumpănaș was reportedly close to Polly Hamilton, who was Dillinger's lover. Once Cumpănaș became aware of Dillinger's real identity, she considered turning him in as a way of obtaining permanent US residence. As Dillinger was rumored to have killed two East Chicago Police Department officers on May 24 of that year, a large reward had also been offered for his capture. On July 22, after contacting the Federal Bureau of Investigation through the Chicago Police, Cumpănaș fingered Dillinger to the FBI agent Melvin Purvis, resulting in Dillinger's shooting outside the Biograph Theater in Chicago. Despite the nickname and her alleged promise to wear red as a distinctive mark, Cumpănaș is said to have actually worn orange that night.

The FBI moved Cumpănaș first to Detroit and then to California. She received a US$5,000 reward, only half of what she had been allegedly promised. In 1935, she informed reporters of the deal to keep her in the country, but deportation proceedings had already begun. Allegedly, the FBI told her they could not stop the procedures, due to bureaucracy or poor communication between branches of the federal government. She appealed the decision to deport her, and her case was heard in Chicago on October 16, 1935. In January 1936, the court agreed with the lower court, and Cumpănaș was deported to Timișoara, Romania, the same year. Making a point of shunning further publicity, she lived there until her death from liver disease in 1947.

== Legacy ==
Famous as the "Woman in Red", Cumpănaș reached the status of cultural icon in the United States in the years following Dillinger's death. Her story was integrated into a series of Dillinger myths, entertaining the public during the Great Depression. According to this popular interpretation, the gangster had been betrayed by his own weakness for women (an idea first circulated by the newspapers covering her role in the 1934 events). On the night of Dillinger's death, an unknown chalked a pavement near the Biograph Theater with the epitaph:

Stranger, stop and wish me well,
Just a prayer for my soul in Hell.
I was a good fellow, most people said,
Betrayed by a woman all dressed in red.

Hollywood films and television productions focusing on Dillinger also include references to Ana Cumpănaș. She has been portrayed, albeit not always as Anna Sage, by several actresses including: Ann Morriss (as Mildred Jaunce) in Gang Busters (1942) and Guns Don't Argue (serialized in 1952, and released as a feature film in 1957); Jean Willes in The FBI Story (1959); Cloris Leachman in Dillinger (1973); Bernadette Peters (as Nellie) in Love, American Style; Louise Fletcher in The Lady in Red (1979); Debi Monahan in Dillinger and Capone (1995); and Branka Katić in Public Enemies (2009).

In Romania, interest in the career of Ana Cumpănaș was sparked by Mircea Veroiu's film Femeia în roșu ("The Woman in Red", 1997). It is in turn based on a 1990 book co-authored by three Postmodernist writers—Adriana Babeți, Mircea Mihăieș, and Mircea Nedelciu—reputedly suggested by Banat Swabian author William Totok. The latter is a fictionalized account, depicting real or imagined events occurring after her return from America. The narrative moves beyond genre boundaries, mixing the account with metafictional elements and accounts of unrelated episodes (involving, among others, writer Elias Canetti and psychoanalyst Sigmund Freud). A best seller, the novel reportedly propelled Cumpănaș the character to iconic status in Romania, and, according to critic Cornel Ungureanu, made her "the actual aunt of autochthonous Postmodernism."

The case of Ana Cumpănaș was discussed by researcher Jay Robert Nash in his book Dillinger: Dead or Alive?, as part of a theory claiming that, unable to apprehend the real John Dillinger, the FBI had staged his killing, using an innocent victim. Nash, whose version of events is deemed "quaint" by crime historian Jonathan Goodman, further argues that her deportation was part of a cover-up.
