= Public Enemies (soundtrack) =

Public Enemies (Original Motion Picture Soundtrack)

Film score / soundtrack album by Elliot Goldenthal and various artists
- Released: June 30, 2009
- Recorded: 2009
- Genre: Film score; soundtrack album
- Length: 46:32
- Label: Decca
- Producer: Matthias Gohl; Michael Mann

Elliot Goldenthal chronology
| Across the Universe (2007) | Public Enemies (2009) | The Tempest (2010) |

Public Enemies (Original Motion Picture Soundtrack) is the soundtrack album to the 2009 film Public Enemies directed by Michael Mann. The soundtrack was released under the Decca Records label on June 30, 2009, featuring original score composed by Elliot Goldenthal and licensed music from the 1930s and 1940s. The album received positive reviews from critics.

== Development ==
Elliot Goldenthal composed the film score in his second collaboration with Mann after Heat (1995). As Mann talked about Billie Holiday's from the onset, Goldenthal and Mann "sifted through tons and tons of American blues" even before the former began writing music. This "freed [him] from doing two jobs—writing the source music and dramatic music at the same time". Goldenthal wrote dramatic music which did not necessarily sound like 1931 or 1933 but crosses various times. Unlike Heat, that had utilized electronics and processed sounds due to its contemporary setting, the score for Public Enemies had to sound acoustic, as the use of electronics or synth sounds make it inappropriate. For the most part, Goldenthal approached it with a classical symphony score, that was reminiscent of George Gershwin's and Ludwig van Beethoven's musical style.

Goldenthal commented that Mann "doesn't like too many twists and turns in the music's structure. He really responds to things that evolve very, very slowly. He wants music that the images, the edits, the dialogue can float above without it corresponding too much." He considered Mann's collaboration was highly iterative with the latter often suggesting unexpected musical ideas and Goldenthal responding with a range of musical textures and approaches. The score featured a mix of orchestral instruments, jazz ensembles and ethnic instruments to enhance the sonic palette and atmosphere.

Goldenthal wanted to describe the complexity of John Dillinger through music, exploring his inner turmoil and gregariousness. Musically, Goldenthal considered it as a reaction to how Americans perceive him. As Dillinger moves from one prison to another, "the music starts off with a moody sense of captivity and then goes into a sense of almost exhilaration" and Goldenthal wanted the audience to react to Dillinger as a "homespun, Robin Hood-type figure". The collision between Dillinger and the type of criminals that did not want to be really noticed, affected the music. Another important cue is Dillinger's death, where Goldenthal wanted to build that in a sense of an edifice in a city that made him an icon in the American fabric. FBI agent Melvin Purvis was described it a "patrician-type" where he was a good cop but forced to do things under the government stamp, while Baby Face Nelson was a bad criminal, and the "regal thing came out of the nobility good winning over evil at that point."

== Reception ==
Steve Leggett of AllMusic wrote "Some soundtrack albums work all on their own apart from the film they were assembled to support, and some, of course, don't work so well stripped of the visual association. This one, thankfully, is haunting and memorable all on its own, flowing with it's [sic] own pacing and telling its own story, ending, in this case, in darkness and tears and Johnson's otherworldly slide guitar." Landon Palmer of Film School Rejects wrote "Perhaps most jarring, however, is Elliot Goldenthal’s score, which has moments of immense power, but comes and goes awkwardly and abruptly, taking one out of the experience of watching the film and making some scenes lose their intended emotional weight." Peter Bradshaw of The Guardian wrote "There is a surging, sombre orchestral score by Elliot Goldenthal which channels the spirit of Bernard Herrmann's music for Taxi Driver."

Todd McCarthy of Variety wrote "Elliot Goldenthal’s brooding score combines with period music to create an effectively eclectic soundtrack." Bernard Hemingway of Cinephilia described it as "a score that resonates richly with the narrative’s themes." Trevor Johnston of Time Out wrote "Elliot Goldenthal’s orchestral score strikes up to suggest some tragedy unfolding, but we’re just not swept up in it". Jonathan Romney of The Independent called it a "routinely lush score". Anne Thompson of IndieWire wrote "Elliot Goldenthal’s jazz-inflected score works to pump things up".

== Track listing ==
| No. | Title | Artist(s) | Length |
|---|---|---|---|
| 1. | "Ten Million Slaves" | Otis Taylor | 4:08 |
| 2. | "Chicago Shake" | The Bruce Fowler Big Band | 3:08 |
| 3. | "Drive to Bohemia" | Elliot Goldenthal | 1:10 |
| 4. | "Love Me or Leave Me" | Billie Holiday | 3:20 |
| 5. | "Billie's Arrest" | Elliot Goldenthal | 2:19 |
| 6. | "Am I Blue?" | Billie Holiday and her Orchestra | 2:50 |
| 7. | "Love in the Dunes" | Elliot Goldenthal | 1:48 |
| 8. | "Bye Bye Blackbird" | Diana Krall | 3:44 |
| 9. | "Phone Call to Billie" | Elliot Goldenthal | 1:42 |
| 10. | "Nasty Letter" | Otis Taylor | 5:04 |
| 11. | "Plane To Chicago" | Elliot Goldenthal | 3:22 |
| 12. | "Guide Me O Thou Great Jehovah" | Indian Bottom Association Old Regular Baptists | 1:35 |
| 13. | "Gold Coast Restaurant" | Elliot Goldenthal | 2:04 |
| 14. | "The Man I Love" | Billie Holiday | 3:05 |
| 15. | "JD Dies" | Elliot Goldenthal | 3:54 |
| 16. | "Dark Was the Night, Cold Was the Ground" | Blind Willie Johnson | 3:19 |
| Total length: | | | 46:32 |

== Personnel ==
Credits adapted from liner notes:

- Music composer – Elliot Goldenthal
- Producer – Michael Mann, Matthias Gohl
- Synth programming – Richard Martinez
- Engineer – Brandon Mason, Frank Wolf, Angie Teo
- Recording and mixing – Joel Iwataki
- Mastering – Vlado Meller
- Music editor – Bob Badami, Chris Brooks, Curtis Roush, Katrina Schiller, Philip Tallman, Steve Durkee
- Executive producer – Bryan Carroll, Kathy Nelson
- Music coordination – Jules Cazedessus, Shinnosuke Miyazawa, Angie Teo
- Music preparation – Eric Stonerook, Mark Baechle

Orchestra

- Conductor – Jonathan Sheffer
- Orchestrators – Elliot Goldenthal, Robert Elhai
- Additional orchestration – Bruce Fowler, Jeff Toine, Angie Teo

Instrumentalists

- Baritone saxophone – Greg Huckins
- Bass – Ann Atkinson, Bruce Morgenthaler, Chris Kollgaard, Francis Wu, Mike Valerio, Nico Abondolo
- Bassoon – Ken Munday, Rose Corrigan
- Cello – Andrew Shulman, Cecilia Tsan, Tina Soule, Chris Ermacoff, Dennis Karmazyn, Jen Kuhn, Larry Corbett, Stephanie Fife, Tim Landauer
- Clarinet – Charles Boito, Gary Gray
- Flute – Dan Higgins, Steve Kujala
- Harp – Katie Kirkpatrick
- Horn – Brad Warnaar, Brian O'Connor, Dan Kelley, David Duke, Jim Thatcher, Kristy Morrell, Steve Becknell
- Oboe – Chris Bleth
- Percussion – Bob Zimmitti, Dan Greco, Ray Frisby
- Piano – Bryan Pezzone
- Timpani – Greg Goodall
- Trombone – Bill Reichenbach, Charlie Loper, Phil Teele, Steve Holtman
- Trumpet – Malcolm McNab, Rick Baptist
- Tuba – Doug Tornquist
- Viola – Andrew Duckles, Brian Dembow, David Walther, Matt Funes, Roland Kato, Shawn Mann, Thomas Diener, Vickie Miskolczy
- Violin – Alan Grunfeld, Ana Landauer, Bruce Dukov, Darius Campo, Dave Ewart, Endre Granat, Eric Hosler, Eun Me Ahn, Helen Nightingale, Jackie Brand, Joel Derouin, Josefina Vergara, Julie Gigante, Kevin Connolly, Liane Mautner, Lily Ho Chen, Marc Sazer, Natalie Leggett, Neel Hammond, Phil Levy, Richard Altenbach, Roberto Cani, Roger Wilkie, Songa Lee, Tammy Hatwan, Tereza Stanislav, Tiffany Yi Hu

Management

- A & R direction for Decca Label Group – Brian Drutman
- Album direction for Universal Pictures – David Buntz
- Chairman, Decca Label Group – Chris Roberts
- Director of scoring for Universal Pictures – Tiffany Jones
- Executive in charge of music for Universal Pictures – Harry Garfield, Kathy Nelson
- Music business affairs For Decca Label Group – Sheryl Gold
- Music business affairs for Universal Pictures – Phil Cohen
- Music consultant – Aran Mann, Becca Mann, Fred Sokolow, Jessie Mann, Kurt Mangum, Patrick Ferris, Zach Cowie

Packaging and design

- Art direction – Pat Barry
- Package coordination – Tom Arndt
- Package design – Frank Famularo

== Accolades ==
| Award | Date of ceremony | Category | Recipients | Result |
|---|---|---|---|---|
| Satellite Awards | December 20, 2009 | Best Original Score | Elliot Goldenthal | Nominated |
