= The Lady in Red (1979 film) =

1979 American crime film

- US film poster
- Directed by: Lewis Teague
- Written by: John Sayles
- Produced by: Julie Corman
- Starring: Pamela Sue Martin; Robert Conrad; Louise Fletcher; Christopher Lloyd
- Cinematography: Daniel Lacambre
- Edited by: Larry Bock; Ron Medico; Lewis Teague
- Music by: James Horner
- Production company: Lady in Red Productions
- Distributed by: New World Pictures
- Release date: July 1979
- Running time: 93 minutes
- Country: United States
- Language: English
- Budget: $900,000
- Box office: $900,000

The Lady in Red (also known as Guns, Sin and Bathtub Gin) is a 1979 American crime drama film directed by Lewis Teague with a screenplay by John Sayles for Roger Corman's New World Pictures. The film stars Pamela Sue Martin and Robert Conrad, and Louise Fletcher. The plot concerns a farmer's daughter who runs away to Chicago, where she falls into a life of crime through association with gangster John Dillinger. It was based on the life of Polly Hamilton, although heavily fictionalised.

Quentin Tarantino called the movie his "candidate for most ambitious film ever made at Roger Corman’s New World Pictures" with "the best script ever written for an exploitation movie" and "one of the best female characters of any movie of the second half of the seventies."

== Plot ==
Polly Franklin is a farm girl in the Midwest at the height of the Great Depression. While running into town on errands, she witnesses a bank robbery and is taken hostage. Sleazy journalist Jake Lingle corners her looking for a story, but instead manipulates her into sleeping with him. He dismisses her without getting the story. Arriving home late, her father, a widowed preacher, beats her. Polly hitchhikes to Chicago.

Upon arriving, Polly gets a job at a sweatshop run by the vicious lecher Patek. She befriends co-worker Rose Shimkus, a Jewish communist who invites her to be her roommate. Rose is arrested when federal agents arrest her on suspicion of assisting a coworker abort a baby fathered by Patek. Polly leads the workers in revolt against Patek, which gets them all fired. Polly gets a job as a taxi dancer, where she is arrested for prostitution.

In prison, Polly reunites with Rose and works doing laundry. The prisoners are tortured by the cruel guard "Tiny" Alice, who targets Rose and black inmates for particularly cruel treatment. Alice tries to get Polly to accept an offer, but she refuses until the two gets into a fight while Polly standing up for a sick Rose. Facing an extended sentence, Polly agrees to be sent to a brothel with Alice receiving a cut.

Alice sends Polly to the brothel of Romanian madam Anna Sage. She befriends fellow prostitute Satin, pianist Pinetop, and bartender Pop. In between shifts, Polly visits Rose and befriends a local hoodlum Eddie, for whom she finds a job at the brothel. Anna promotes Polly as a virginal preacher-farmer's daughter, which quickly makes her popular with customers — including sadistic mobster Frognose, Jake Lingle, and the kinder freelance mobster Turk. Polly finds her first satisfactory sexual experience with Turk, who treats her as more than a sexual object. Their relationship grows more romantic as Polly covers for him when questioned after witnessing one of his hits.

While giving her a pedicure, Rose gets into a fight with Tiny Alice after the latter teases her over her friendship with Polly. Tiny Alice stabs Rose to death in a fit of rage, which leads to a prison revolt that results in Alice being brutally tortured and killed by the other prisoners. Polly is devastated over Rose's death, and traumatized when she finds Satin having been tortured to death by Frognose. Anna's brothel is forced to shut down as a result of the murder.

Polly is the only one of the girls to work at Anna's new diner, along with Pop as a cook and Eddie as a dishwasher. Anna also faces deportation. At the restaurant, Polly catches the eye of a well-off customer. She reluctantly agrees to go to the movies with him, but finds herself having a good time. Anna is concerned by the relationship, neither of them knowing that the man is actually gangster John Dillinger. As the couple spend more time together, Polly falls in love with him and he is accepting of her past as a prostitute. After being told by a customer about Dillinger, Anna uses the information to turn him into Melvin Purvis at the FBI and help her chances of staying in the country.

Polly and Anna go to the movies with Dillinger, with Polly and Dillinger unaware of the set-up. Dillinger is killed by the FBI as he walks out of the theater. Polly is devastated by Dillinger's death, and even more so after Jake Lingle writes an article falsely accusing her of betraying Dillinger — a celebrated public figure — to the FBI.

Enraged by Anna's betrayal and Lingle's article, she enlists Eddie, Pops, and Pinetop to help her get revenge by robbing a bank linked to the mob. Polly dodges a hit put out by Frognose by killing his thugs, while Pinetop kills Frognose. The robbery is successful, though Pinetop is killed in the getaway with Pops fatally injured. Eddie sacrifices himself in a shootout, and Pops begs Polly to shoot him and abandon the car so she can get away with the money.

Turk lures Jake Lingle with an anonymous tip to kill him as a favor to Polly. Polly successfully escapes with the money, hitchhiking her way out to California.

== Cast ==
- Pamela Sue Martin as Polly Franklin
- Robert Conrad as John Dillinger
- Louise Fletcher as Anna Sage
- Robert Hogan as Jake Lingle
- Laurie Heineman as Rose Shimkus
- Glenn Withrow as Eddie
- Rod Gist as Pinetop
- Peter Hobbs as Pops Geissler
- Christopher Lloyd as Frognose
- Dick Miller as Patek
- Nancy Parsons as Tiny Alice
- Alan Vint as Melvin Purvis
- Robert Forster as Turk (uncredited)
- Mary Woronov as Woman Bankrobber
- Chip Fields as Satin

== Production ==
=== Development ===
John Sayles had previously written Piranha (1978) for producer Roger Corman which had done very well critically and commercially. Corman wanted Sayles to write another script for him at New World Pictures. Sayles said Corman told him he wanted "a female Godfather story about the woman who was with John Dillinger when he was shot” and that was all.

Corman had previously made some successful female-orientated gangster films set in the 1930s, Bloody Mama (1970) and Big Bad Mama (1974). He asked Sayles for a treatment. According to Sayles:

I wanted to do more than I knew Roger Corman wanted to do with that script. He basically wanted Bloody Mama Part Three; I wanted to get into other things about the thirties. So I said, “Roger, I will not write you a treatment, I’ll write you a full draft.” And that way I was able to show him things that, if I had just said, “I wanna go into this area, I wanna take her to jail, take her to a sweatshop,” he’d say, “Oh no, that’s beside the point”; whereas when I put it in the script he sort of got to liking the story. So I was able to campaign for the script that I wanted, and get him to agree that he liked that, too.

Sayles was interested in 1930s Chicago and admired the television series The Untouchables; he also read many novelists from that era such as James T. Farrell and Ring Lardner and watched early talking pictures. Sayles wrote a full screenplay which he called "one of the best scripts I've written. He said the film "tried to be about" was:

Why Dillinger and the FBI were shooting each other. To me, Dillinger was just a PR job. J. Edgar Hoover made stars out of the guys he knew he could catch. He never got anybody from the Mafia. In other words, to me that movie was about why Dillinger became Public Enemy No. 1 at a time when one-third of the women in Chicago between the ages of 15 and 35 were working as prostitutes.

The job of directing went to Lewis Teague, who had worked at New World Pictures for a number of years as an editor and second unit director. Teague recalls, "I was given that script and told to go with it. I didn't really have a chance to mold or change it. It was very socially conscious for an action picture about the Great Depression. I had twenty days to shoot it, and three to edit and a budget of less than a million."

Sayles was concerned about the budget. He said "I'd ask 'Should I writer this smaller?' And they'd say 'No, just write it good.' And I thought well maybe Lewis can campaign for more money. But he couldn't."

The film was produced by Corman's wife Julie who said "I passionately believed in Lady in Red... and I believed in the political and moral issues at the center of the story."

=== Casting ===
According to Sayles, Teague had "no voice in casting the first four leads." The writer says that even though the lead character is aged from 17 to 21, the first actress offered the lead was Angie Dickinson, who had starred in Big Bad Mama for Corman. Sayles said Dickinson "almost took it... It would have taken a total rewrite to make it make any sense at all. Angie Dickinson, luckily, realized that, and realized that a total rewrite probably wasn’t going to happen and there she would be, making a picture about an 18-year-old woman, and she’s over 40."

Instead the lead role went to Pamela Sue Martin, best known at the time for playing Nancy Drew on television.

=== Filming ===
Sayles commented "I just got too ambitious... I gave them a 120 page script and they gave Lewis a 90 page script budget."

According to Sayles the original draft was 135 pages and he had to cut it down during filming as there was not enough time or money to film the script as written. He said "Originally there were four scenes between when the main character’s friend in the factory dies and her friend who’s a prostitute dies, but those four scenes didn’t get shot so now there’s only five minutes between two best friends getting killed. It really got squeezed out as a 90-minute movie from a 135-page script. I probably got it down to about 100 pages."

John Sayles later said the film "didn't turn out the way I wanted because they just didn't have the budget to make the movie right. I wanted that to be a real breathless, '30s, Jimmy Cagney everybody-talking-fast type movie. It turned out a little more like Louis Malle. Different movies have different speeds."

Sayles added, "All the scenes where the people machine-gun other people are left in the movie and the ones that explain why the people are machine-gunning other people are gone — they didn't use them. Half the time, you don't even know why these people are shooting each other."

The soundtrack of this film is notable as the first film score composed by James Horner, who went on to a multiple Oscar, Golden Globe and Grammy-winning career.

== Release ==
The film was not a big success at the box office. Roger Corman re-released it in 1980 under the title Guns, Sin and Bathtub Gin, but it did not fare much better.

On December 17, 2010, Shout! Factory released the title on DVD, packaged as a double feature with Crazy Mama as part of the Roger Corman Cult Classics collection.

== Reception ==
=== Critical ===
The Los Angeles Times liked the photography but thought "the film is corrupt and offensive because it sensationalises racism and sexism." LA Weekly wrote "the 30s are recreated better than I've seen in any film since Chinatown. The dialogue is America-talk, off-the-cuff, humorous, vague, appealing and tired with the fatigue of working for a living... The Lady in Red is the Breaking Away of crime adventures."

The Observer called it "a feminist, sex, sadism and socialism picture".

On Rotten Tomatoes, the film has an aggregated score of 83% based on 5 positive and 1 negative reviews.

Sayles later said "if I see any flaw in the direction of that picture it's that the rhythm wasn't quite fast enough. And I think it's because acting styles have changed and the way people talk has changed. They used to just get on with it." Although Sayles disliked the final film he later said it "still has some feeling and substance."

Quentin Tarantino felt "Sayles’ script deserved a much bigger canvas, a much, much bigger budget, and a much, much, much longer shooting schedule. With all the limitations imposed on them, Teague’s film is a miracle... it’s like five thirties set female-led features rolled into one huge Russian novel of a movie (shot on a shoestring in four weeks)."

=== Box-office ===
In 1984 Sayles said Lady in Red was "the only movie" he wrote for Roger Corman "that I wish I had been given the chance of directing. It was a very ambitious script and it has become very popular in Europe but has fared hopelessly in the U.S. where it has had two title changes Bullets, Sin and Bathtub Gin and Kiss Me and Die. It has never caught on properly because the gangster genre is as dead as a doornail." Sayles did say the film "just broke even."

== In popular culture ==
In Quentin Tarantino's novel Once Upon a Time in Hollywood, in an alternate history, he himself had released a remake of the film in 1999.

Teague enjoyed working with Sayles and asked for Sayles to rewrite Alligator.

== Notes ==
- Sayles, John (1999). Diane, Carson (ed.). John Sayles : interviews. Jackson: University Press of Mississippi. ISBN 1578061377.
- Sayles, John (1998). Smith, Gavin (ed.). Sayles on Sayles. Faber & Faber/Farrar, Straus and Giroux. ISBN 0-571-19280-7.
