= Public Enemies (2009 film) =

2009 film by Michael Mann

- Theatrical release poster
- Directed by: Michael Mann
- Screenplay by: Ronan Bennett; Ann Biderman; Michael Mann
- Based on: Public Enemies: America's Greatest Crime Wave and the Birth of the FBI, 1933–34 by Bryan Burrough
- Produced by: Michael Mann; Kevin Misher
- Starring: Johnny Depp; Christian Bale; Marion Cotillard; Billy Crudup; Stephen Dorff; Stephen Lang
- Cinematography: Dante Spinotti
- Edited by: Paul Rubell; Jeffrey Ford
- Music by: Elliot Goldenthal
- Production companies: Relativity Media; Forward Pass; Misher Films; TriBeCa Productions; Appian Way
- Distributed by: Universal Pictures
- Release dates: June 19, 2009 (Chicago); July 1, 2009 (United States)
- Running time: 140 minutes
- Country: United States
- Language: English
- Budget: $80–100 million
- Box office: $214.1 million

Public Enemies is a 2009 American biographical crime film directed by Michael Mann, who co-wrote the screenplay with Ronan Bennett and Ann Biderman. It is an adaptation of Bryan Burrough's 2004 non-fiction book Public Enemies: America's Greatest Crime Wave and the Birth of the FBI, 1933–34. Set during the Great Depression, the film chronicles the final years of the notorious bank robber John Dillinger (Johnny Depp) as he is pursued by FBI agent Melvin Purvis (Christian Bale), Dillinger's relationship with Billie Frechette (Marion Cotillard), as well as Purvis' pursuit of Dillinger's associates and fellow criminals John "Red" Hamilton (Jason Clarke), Homer Van Meter (Stephen Dorff), Harry Pierpont (David Wenham), and Baby Face Nelson (Stephen Graham).

Burrough originally intended to make a television miniseries about the Depression-era crime wave in the United States, but decided to write a book on the subject instead. Mann developed the project, and some scenes were filmed on location where they occurred, though the film is not entirely historically accurate. Public Enemies premiered in Chicago on June 19, 2009, and was released on July 1, 2009, by Universal Pictures. The film received generally positive reviews from critics and grossed $214.1 million worldwide against an $80–100 million budget.

== Plot ==
In 1933, John Dillinger infiltrates Indiana State Penitentiary, jailbreaking his crew. During the firefight, his mentor Walter Dietrich is shot and killed. Dillinger and company change clothes and eat at a nearby farm before driving to a safe house on Chicago's east-side.

After killing Charles Floyd, FBI agent Melvin Purvis is promoted by J. Edgar Hoover to lead the hunt for Dillinger. Purvis also uses modern methods to battle crime, from cataloging fingerprints to tapping telephone lines.

In between a series of bank robberies, Dillinger meets Billie Frechette at a restaurant and impresses her by buying her a fur coat. Frechette falls for Dillinger even after he reveals his identity, and they become inseparable.

Purvis leads a failed ambush of Dillinger at a hotel, and an FBI agent is killed by Baby Face Nelson, who escapes with Tommy Carroll. Purvis asks Hoover for additional, experienced agents to deal with the hardened killers. Intelligence officer Charles Winstead, of military background, subsequently arrives to assist Purvis.

Police arrest Dillinger and his gang in Tucson, Arizona, after a fire breaks out in their Hotel Congress. Dillinger is extradited to Indiana, where Sheriff Lillian Holley locks him up in the Lake County Jail in Crown Point. Using a fake gun to escape, he is unable to see Frechette, who is under tight police surveillance. Dillinger learns that Frank Nitti's associates won't help as the FBI has been prosecuting interstate crime thanks to him, imperiling Nitti's bookmaking racket. This severs Dillinger's ties with the Chicago Outfit, forcing him and Red Hamilton to seek money elsewhere.

Carroll goads a desperate Dillinger into robbing $800,000 from a bank in Sioux Falls with Baby Face Nelson. Both Dillinger and Carroll are shot, and have to leave Carroll behind. They retreat to the Little Bohemia Lodge in Manitowish Waters, Wisconsin, realizing their haul (~$46,000) is significantly less than expected. Dillinger hopes he can free the rest from prison, including Pierpont and Makley, but Hamilton convinces him this is unlikely. Dillinger longs to see Frechette again.

Purvis and his men apprehend Carroll and torture him for the gang's location. An ambush is organized at Little Bohemia. Dillinger and Hamilton break away, and agents Winstead and Hurt pursue them through the woods, engaging in a shootout that fatally wounds Hamilton. Nelson, Shouse, and Van Meter hijack a Bureau car, killing Purvis's partner Carter Baum in the process. After a car chase, Purvis and his men kill Nelson and the rest of the gang. Elsewhere, Hamilton dies from his injuries after warning Dillinger to let Frechette go.

Dillinger meets Frechette, telling her he will commit one more robbery to pay enough for them to escape together. He drops her off, thinking she is safe, but she is arrested and badly beaten for refusing to reveal his whereabouts. Winstead and Purvis eventually intervene to stop the abusive and violent interrogation. Dillinger organizes a train robbery with Alvin Karpis and the Barker Gang, intending to flee the country the next day. Receiving a note from Frechette through her lawyer, Louis Piquett, he is told not to break her out of jail as she will be released in two years.

Purvis enlists the help of Anna Sage, a "madam" and one of Dillinger's acquaintances, threatening her with deportation to Romania, unless she sets up Dillinger, to hide out at her brothel. They go out to see Manhattan Melodrama but when out of the theater, are met by Purvis and other agents who awaited them. Dillinger spots the police unit but is shot before he can aim. Winstead kneels down beside the dying Dillinger to hear his last words. Purvis informs Hoover of Dillinger's death as bystanders begin to crowd around his body.

Winstead visits Frechette in prison; she already knows about Dillinger's death. He tells her that he thinks his dying words were, "Tell Billie for me, 'Bye, bye, Blackbird.'" Frechette sheds tears as Winstead leaves. Closing titles explain that Purvis quit the FBI a year later and committed suicide in 1960, and Frechette was released after two years.

== Cast ==
- Johnny Depp as John Dillinger, a notorious and charismatic bank robber whom the FBI declares to be "Public Enemy No. 1". Depp was involved in a film adaptation of Shantaram which was postponed in late 2007, allowing him to star in Public Enemies. He was officially cast that December. Depp described Dillinger as a "...man of the people...There is a Robin Hood edge to John Dillinger." and "that era's rock and roll star. He was a very charismatic man and he lived the way he wanted to and didn't compromise." He felt "some kind of inherent connection" to Dillinger through one of his grandfathers, who ran moonshine, and his stepfather, who committed burglaries and robberies and spent time in the same prison Dillinger helped his associates escape from. Depp could not find a recording of Dillinger's own voice, but did find recordings of Dillinger's father. He said when he heard Dillinger's father's voice, "I started to do the math and think, 'Well, he was raised basically a farm boy in southern Indiana.' [...] I was born and raised in Owensboro, Kentucky, which is about 70 miles from where Dillinger was born and that's when it all clicked for me. I knew how he moved. I knew how he talked."
- Christian Bale as Melvin Purvis. Bale was not familiar with who Purvis was before making the film and "spent a great deal of time" with Purvis' son Alston and met other family and friends of Purvis, who died in 1960. Bale said he "never viewed Purvis as having a real personal zeal for taking down Dillinger. I think that he was somebody who was very understanding in acknowledging why the public felt Dillinger to be almost a hero. He wasn't unaware of the problems of the day and the terrible deprivation of the majority of the population." He thought Purvis' "driving motivation was that he truly believed in Hoover and had a great desire to realize Hoover's brilliant vision. That's really what I played with in my mind throughout this movie was the conflict between wanting to achieve that vision but recognizing Hoover's own compromises which Purvis wasn't entirely happy with making. In fact, very unhappy with making."
- Marion Cotillard as Billie Frechette, a singer and coat check girl who immediately becomes John Dillinger's love interest. Cotillard was cast after Nine (2009) was postponed. Multiple American actresses also wanted the part; Mann found Cotillard "focused and artistically ambitious". She trained herself to speak in a French-Canadian-Menominee-Wisconsin-Chicago accent and spoke only English for three months during filming. Cotillard "really wanted to know about [Frechette's] childhood" and met with relatives of Frechette in northern Wisconsin. "At a young age, she was sent to a boarding school, and it was a very difficult place where they tried to erase everything that was Indian in her. And I think that she encountered there a great injustice, and she shared with Dillinger a suspicion of authority. I think the two of them saw that in each other and they fell in love immediately, and there was a very strong connection between them", Cotillard said.
- Billy Crudup as J. Edgar Hoover. Crudup was cast as the future director of the Federal Bureau of Investigation by April 2008.
- Stephen Dorff as Homer Van Meter, one of Dillinger's associates and a seasoned bank robber.
- Stephen Lang as FBI Agent Charles Winstead, a war veteran, Purvis's trusted second-in-command, and one of Dillinger's killers.
- Michael Bentt as Herbert Youngblood, a black criminal who helps Dillinger escape from Crown Point.
- Stephen Graham as George "Baby Face" Nelson, a sociopathic member of Dillinger's gang, known for his obsession with killing law officers.
- Jason Clarke as John "Red" Hamilton, Dillinger's oldest friend and close advisor.
- David Wenham as Harry Pierpont
- Spencer Garrett as Tommy Carroll
- Christian Stolte as Charles Makley
- Giovanni Ribisi as Alvin Karpis
- John Ortiz as Phil D'Andrea
- Domenick Lombardozzi as Gilbert Catena
- Bill Camp as Frank Nitti
- Rory Cochrane as FBI Agent Carter Baum
- Richard Short as FBI Agent Sam Cowley
- Carey Mulligan as Carol Slayman
- John Michael Bolger as Martin Zarkovich
- Branka Katić as Anna Sage
- Emilie de Ravin as Barbara Patzke
- Shawn Hatosy as FBI Agent John Madala
- Don Frye as FBI Agent Clarence Hurt
- Matt Craven as FBI Agent Gerry Campbell
- Channing Tatum as Charles "Pretty Boy" Floyd
- Lili Taylor as Sheriff Lillian Holley
- David Warshofsky as Warden Baker
- Peter Gerety as Louis Piquett
- Michael Vieau as Ed Shouse
- Casey Siemaszko as Harry Berman
- Adam Mucci as Harold Reinecke
- Leelee Sobieski as Polly Hamilton
- James Russo as Walter Dietrich
- Chandler Williams as FBI Associate Director Clyde Tolson
- Ed Bruce as Senator Kenneth McKellar
- John Hoogenakker as Hugh Clegg

== Production ==
=== Development ===
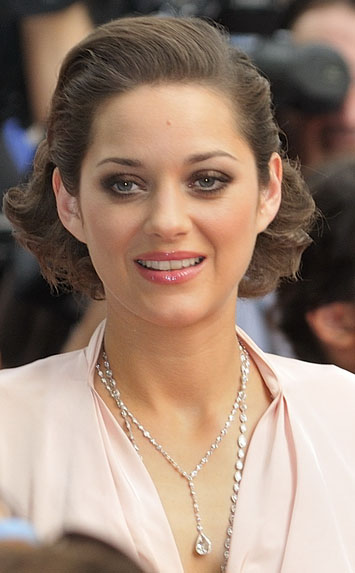
Cotillard at the film's Paris premiere

Public Enemies is based on Bryan Burrough's 2004 non-fiction book, Public Enemies: America's Greatest Crime Wave and the Birth of the FBI, 1933–34. Burrough had originally begun researching the subject with the aim of creating a miniseries. The idea was accepted by HBO and Burrough was made an executive producer, along with Robert De Niro's Tribeca Productions, and was asked to write the screenplay. Burrough had no experience in screenwriting, and says his drafts were probably "very, very bad. Ishtar bad." He began simultaneously writing a non-fiction book, which he found easier, spending two years working on it while the interest in the miniseries disappeared.

Burrough's book was set to be published in the summer of 2004 and he asked HBO to return the movie rights. They agreed and after the book was released, the rights were re-sold to production companies representing Michael Mann and Leonardo DiCaprio, the latter of whom was interested in playing John Dillinger. Burrough met with a representative and then heard nothing for three years. DiCaprio eventually left the project to appear in Martin Scorsese's Shutter Island.

Mann had written a screenplay about Alvin Karpis in the 1970s for producer Harold Hecht, which was never produced. After reading an excerpt from Burrough's book in Vanity Fair, he eventually worked to develop a film based on the book with producer Kevin Misher. Novelist and screenwriter Ronan Bennett had written a screenplay about Che Guevara which Mann had intended to develop, but the project was shelved as Steven Soderbergh was already working on his two-part biopic about Guevara. Starting in 2006, Bennett worked for over 18 months on adapting Burrough's book, writing several drafts.

Former NYPD Blue writer and Southland creator Ann Biderman rewrote the screenplay with Mann, who polished it before shooting began. Of the screenplay, Burrough has said "it's not 100 percent historically accurate. But it's by far the closest thing to fact Hollywood has attempted, and for that I am both excited and quietly relieved."

=== Filming ===
Principal photography began in Columbus, Wisconsin on March 17, 2008 and continued in the Illinois cities of Chicago, Aurora, Joliet and Lockport; and the Wisconsin cities of Oshkosh, Beaver Dam, Columbus, Darlington, Milwaukee, Madison and several other places in Wisconsin; including the Little Bohemia Lodge in Manitowish Waters, Wisconsin, the actual location of a 1934 gun fight between Dillinger and the FBI. Some parts of the film were shot in Crown Point, Indiana, the town where Dillinger was imprisoned and escaped from jail. The actual 1932 Studebaker used by Dillinger during a robbery in Greencastle, Indiana was used during filming in Columbus, borrowed from the nearby Historic Auto Attractions museum.

The decision to shoot parts of the film in Wisconsin came about because of the number of high quality historic buildings. Mann, who had been a student at University of Wisconsin–Madison, scouted locations in Baraboo and Columbus as well as looking at 1930s-era cars from collectors in the Madison area. The film was shot at actual historical sites, including the Little Bohemia Lodge, and the old Lake County jail in Crown Point, Indiana, where Dillinger staged his most famous escape where legend has it he fooled jail officers with a wooden gun and escaped in the sheriff's car. Scenes were shot at places that he frequented in Oshkosh. The courthouse in Darlington is the location for the courthouse scenes. A bank robbery scene was shot inside the Milwaukee County Historical Society, a former bank in Milwaukee that still has much of the original period architecture.

In late March 2008, portions of the film were shot at Libertyville High School. Footage includes one of the school's science labs, an office, the school's front entrance, and the locker rooms.

In April 2008, the production filmed in Oshkosh. Filming occurred downtown and at Pioneer Airport, including scenes shot using a historic Ford Trimotor airliner owned by the Experimental Aircraft Association. Later that month, filming started at the Little Bohemia Lodge. In April and May 2008, film crews shot on the grounds of Ishnala, a historic restaurant in the Wisconsin Dells area.

The film became a flash point in the public debate about the "film tax credits" that are offered by many states. The state of Wisconsin gave NBC Universal $4.6 million in tax credits, while the film company spent just $5 million in Wisconsin during filming and shortly after the incentive program was ended.

Michael Mann, the director, decided to shoot the movie in HD format instead of using the traditional 35mm film. Cinematographer Dante Spinotti used Sony F23 digital cameras. Public Enemies would be Mann's first all-digital feature.

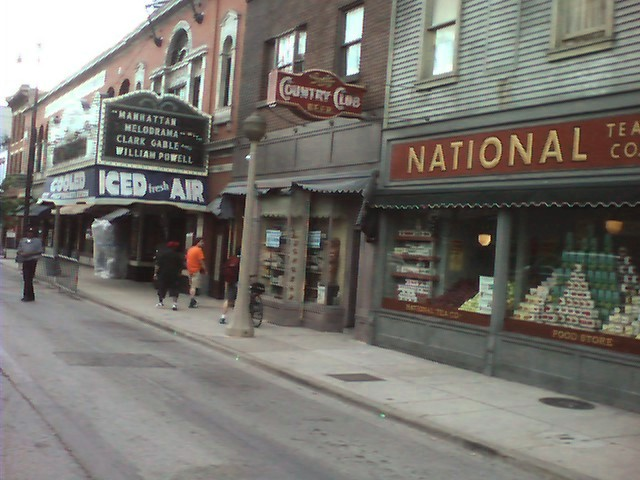
The Biograph Theater and (adjoining businesses) redressed for the film.

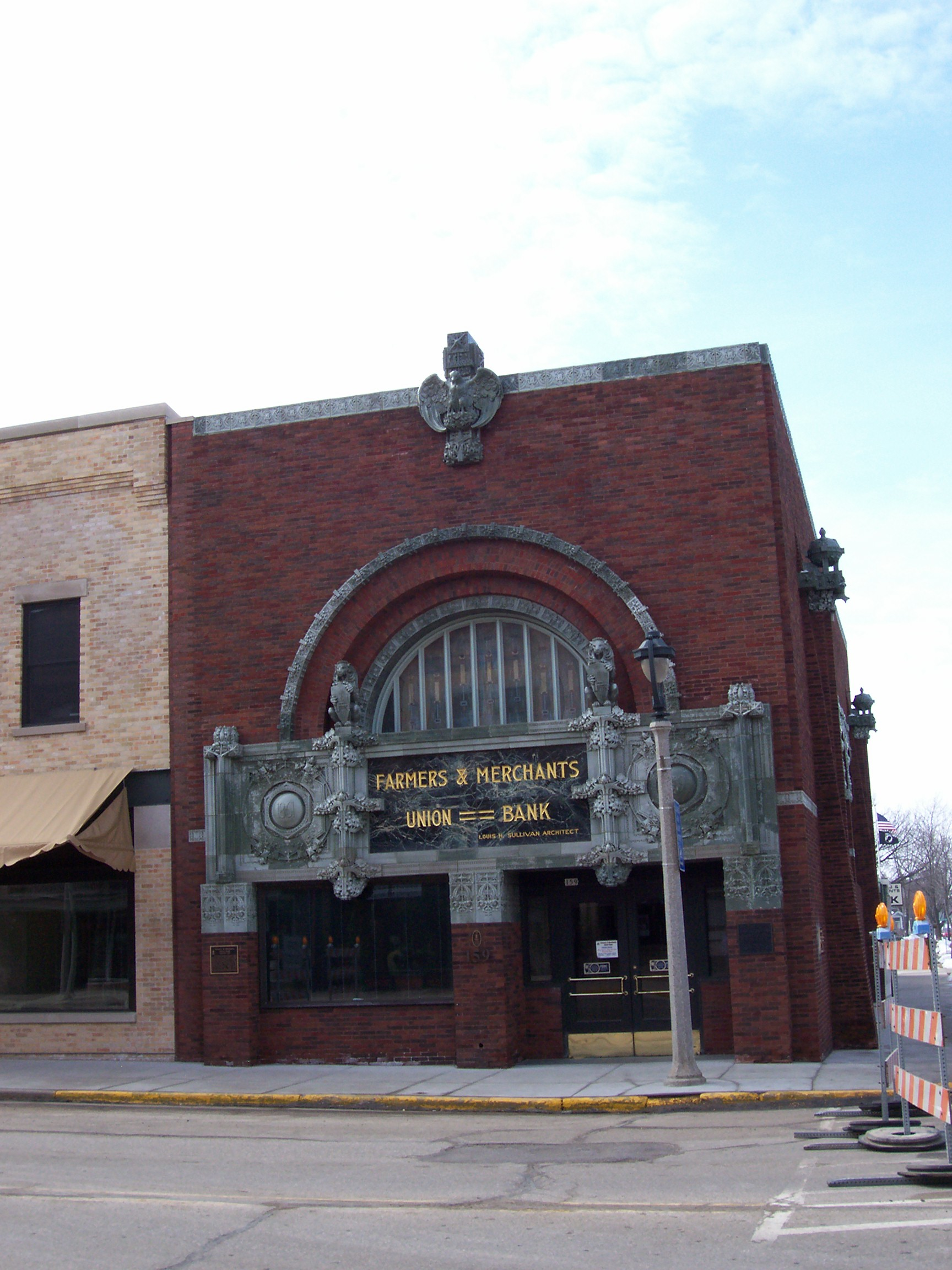
Farmer's & Merchants Bank, redressed for the film.

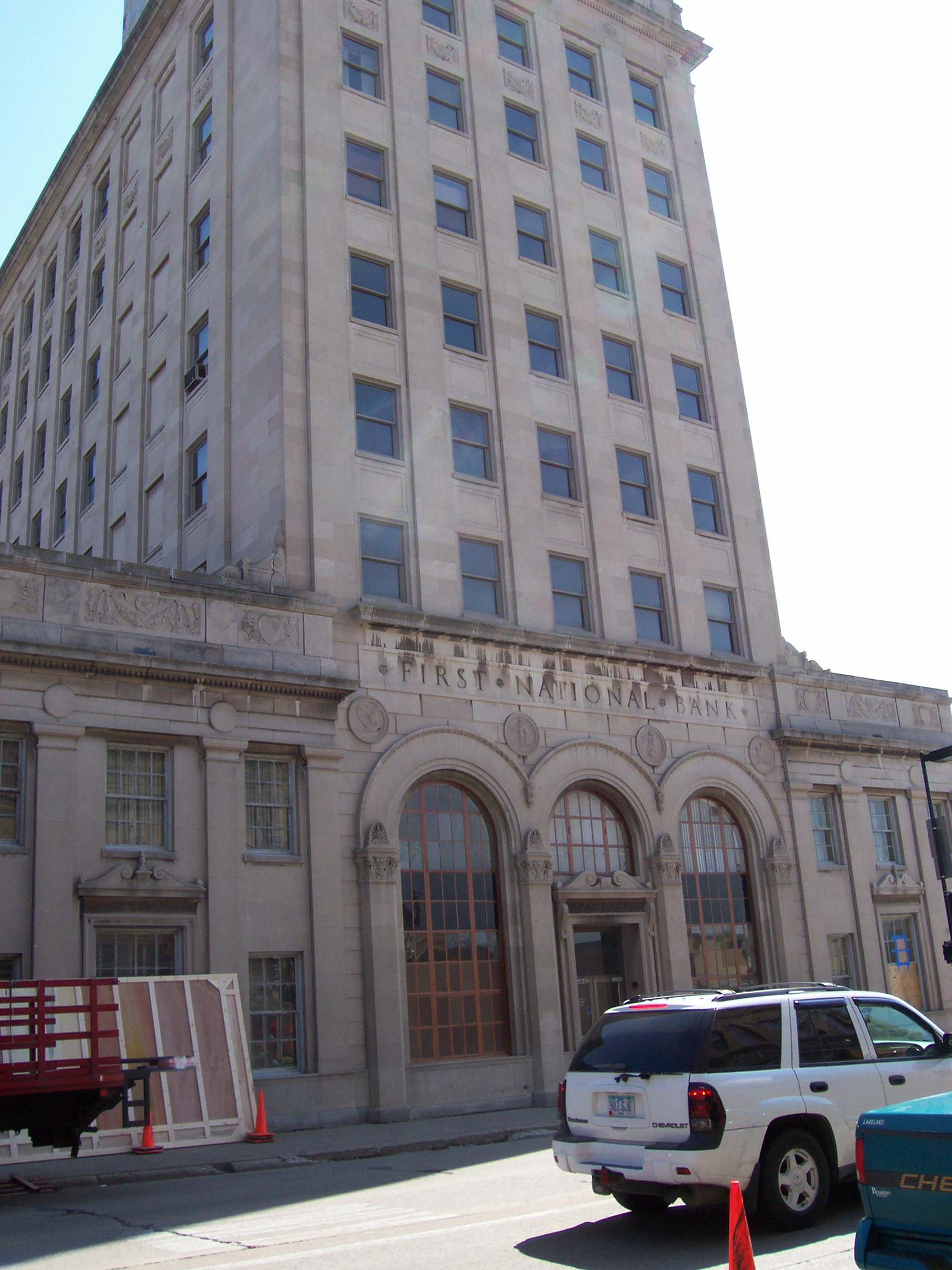
First National Bank during filming

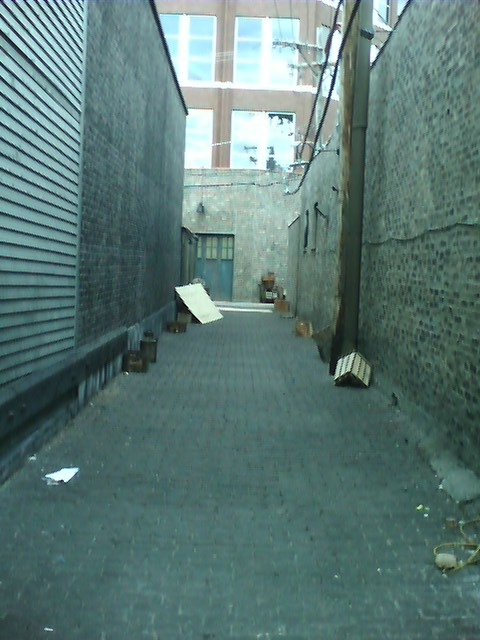
The alley where John Dillinger was killed, redressed for the film.

=== Post-production ===
Elliot Goldenthal composed the score of Public Enemies. Before Goldenthal wrote any music, he and Mann "sifted through tons and tons of American blues" as the director had talked about Billie Holiday's music "from the very beginning." Goldenthal said: "My job was chiefly composing dramatic music that didn't necessarily have to sound like it came from 1931 or 1933. It could be timeless." Goldenthal previously worked with Mann on Heat (1995). He commented that Mann "doesn't like too many twists and turns in the music's structure. He really responds to things that evolve very, very slowly. He wants music that the images, the edits, the dialogue can float above without it corresponding too much."

== Release ==
A preview of Public Enemies was seen at the end of the 81st Academy Awards, with the first trailer being released shortly after on March 5, 2009. Public Enemies had its world premiere in Chicago on June 19, 2009, and was screened at the Los Angeles Film Festival on June 23, 2009. The film was given wide release in the United States on July 1.

=== Home media ===
Public Enemies was released on DVD and Blu-ray Disc in the United States December 8, 2009. The two-disc special edition features a commentary track by the director and featurettes about the making of the film and the historical figures depicted in the film. In promotion of the home media release, the multiplayer browser game Mafia Wars featured collectible "loot" from characters in the film.

== Reception ==
=== Box office ===
Public Enemies opened at number three behind Transformers: Revenge of the Fallen and Ice Age: Dawn of the Dinosaurs with $25.3 million. The following weekend it had a 45.5% drop to $13.8 million for a running total of $66.2 million. The next three weekends the film experienced drops of 46% or less. It went on to gross $97.1 million domestically with a worldwide gross of $214.1 million in revenue, against its production budget of $100 million.

=== Critical response ===
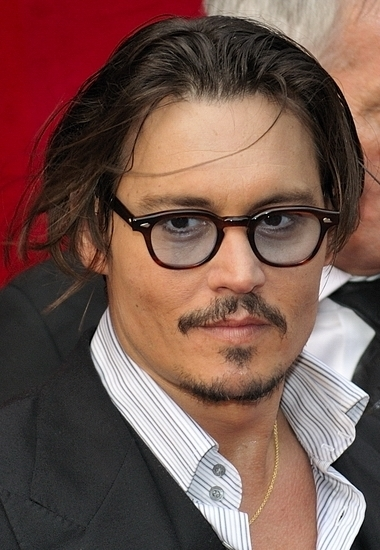
Depp at the film's Paris premiere. He received critical praise for his performance.

On the review aggregator website Rotten Tomatoes, 68% of 278 critics' reviews are positive, with an average rating of 6.4/10. The website's consensus reads: "Michael Mann's latest is a competent and technically impressive gangster flick with charismatic lead performances, but some may find the film lacks truly compelling drama." Metacritic, which uses a weighted average, assigned the film a score of 70 out of 100, based on 35 critics, indicating "generally favorable" reviews. Audiences polled by CinemaScore gave the film an average grade of "B" on an A+ to F scale.

Rob James from Total Film gave the film 4/5 stars, stating: "This superstar crime thriller emerges as something surprising, fascinating and technically dazzling." Most critics reviewing the film praised individual performances, specifically Depp as Dillinger. Roger Ebert, who gave it a 3.5/4 stars, stated: "This Johnny Depp performance is something else. For once an actor playing a gangster does not seem to base his performance on movies he has seen. He starts cold. He plays Dillinger as a fact." Billy Crudup's performance was described as "disarmingly good" by Variety's Todd McCarthy.

Critics also gave praise to the film's cinematography and set pieces. Manohla Dargis of The New York Times stated: "Michael Mann's Public Enemies is a grave and beautiful work of art. Shot in high-definition digital by a filmmaker who's helping change the way movies look, it revisits with meticulous detail and convulsions of violence a short, frantic period in the life and bank-robbing times of John Dillinger."

While most critics praised the film, others expressed displeasure. Critic Liam Lacey, of The Globe and Mail, believed the film was missing "any image of the economic misery that made Dillinger a folk hero", and, "the most regrettable crime here is the way that Mann, trying to do too much, robs himself of a great opportunity." Similarly, Richard Corliss of Time claimed the film's emphasis on docudrama allowed for "precious little dramatic juice".

Film critic and novelist Stephen Hunter called the film a "disgrace" and an "idiotic version of Bryan Burrough's majestic Public Enemies". He asked "Who but an idiot tells a story that ends at the Biograph instead of Barrington and tells the love story of Dillinger and one of his (many) hookers, not the one between Les and Helen?"

Public Enemies has been described as a neo-noir film by some authors.

Keith Uhlich of Time Out New York named Public Enemies the seventh-best film of 2009.

== Historical accuracy ==
Shortly before the theatrical release of Public Enemies, Burrough wrote that director Michael Mann "impressed [him] as a real stickler for historical accuracy. Yes, there is fictionalization in this movie, including some to the timeline, but that's Hollywood; if it was 100% accurate, you would call it a documentary." Dillinger's jailbreak from Crown Point, Indiana, the gunfight at the Little Bohemia Lodge, and Dillinger's death near the Biograph Theater in Chicago were all filmed where they actually happened. Burrough's non-fiction book on which the film is based details the demise of multiple infamous criminals in a 14-month period in 1933–34, including Dillinger, Bonnie and Clyde, the Barker-Karpis gang, the Kansas City Massacre, and Machine Gun Kelly. In focusing on Dillinger, Mann and co-writers Biderman and Bennett omitted Bonnie and Clyde entirely, briefly included only one member of the Barker gang (Alvin Karpis), and left out Pretty Boy Floyd except for his death.

In the film, Dillinger is shown participating in a 1933 prison break from Indiana State Prison and freeing some of his associates in a shootout. In reality, Dillinger helped smuggle weapons into the prison for his associates; however, it is unclear how: Burrough's book reports that some believed Dillinger tossed the weapons over the prison fence, while other accounts, and the film, suggest that the guns were smuggled in boxes of silk sent to the prison shirt factory. Also, Dillinger was not present during the escape, because he was imprisoned in Lima, Ohio at the time, and "few shots were fired" according to historian Elliott Gorn. The only injury was a clerk shot in the leg, and no guards were killed.

Dillinger's preexisting friendship with those he helped break out, like Pierpont and Makley, who had taught Dillinger how to rob banks while he was in prison with them previously, is not presented. Mann explained that "[Dillinger and his associates] employed techniques picked up from the military by a man [...] [who] mentored Walter Dietrich, the man who died at the beginning of the movie, who mentored Dillinger. So Dillinger's time in prison was really a post-graduate course in robbing banks, but what really interested me was he doesn't so much get out of prison when he's released but he explodes out".

Contrary to the film, "Pretty Boy" Floyd, full name Charles Arthur Floyd, was not shot in an apple orchard as suggested. After the death of John Dillinger, Pretty Boy Floyd became public enemy No. 1. Floyd was shot and killed three months later. The location of his death was in East Liverpool, Ohio in a cornfield. While Melvin Purvis was present at the time of Floyd's death he was one of several agents present at the time, Floyd died of two gunshot wounds. Floyd's last words are believed to have been "I'm done for; you've hit me twice."

During a phone call with Hoover, Purvis requests assistance from experienced cops in the film, a decision that Hoover actually made on his own. In reference to Dillinger's escape from Crown Point, Mann said that "[Dillinger] didn't take six or seven people hostage, he took 17 officers hostage with that wooden gun he had carved. It wouldn't be credible if you put it in a movie, so we had to tone it down." In the course of Dillinger's 1933–34 crime spree, he is depicted as killing multiple people. Gorn writes that Dillinger himself "probably murdered just one man": William Patrick O'Malley, a cop who had been shot during a holdup in East Chicago, Indiana.

Although Purvis was in charge of the Bureau of Investigation's office in Chicago as depicted in the film, fellow agent Samuel Cowley led the Dillinger investigation in its final months before Dillinger's death. In the film, Homer Van Meter and Baby Face Nelson are shot to death by Purvis after a vehicular pursuit from the Little Bohemia Lodge. Van Meter was actually killed by St. Paul police a few weeks after Dillinger's death. Nelson was killed on November 27, 1934, in a gunfight with Cowley.

In the film, Dillinger and Purvis have a brief conversation in person while Dillinger is incarcerated. In reality, they came close to seeing each other, right before Dillinger died, but never actually exchanged words. The scene of Dillinger walking into the detective bureau of a Chicago police station unrecognized and asking an officer for the score of a baseball game being broadcast on the radio was based on fact, according to Mann and Depp. Winstead hears Dillinger's last words – "Bye, bye, blackbird" – and later relays them to Frechette in the film. Burrough wrote that Dillinger's lips were reportedly moving just after he fell from being shot outside the Biograph Theater and that "Winstead was the first to reach him", but what he might have said is unknown.

== See also ==
- Film industry in Wisconsin
- Public Enemies (soundtrack)
- Cinema of the United States
