= Manhattan Melodrama =

1934 film by W. S. Van Dyke and George Cukor

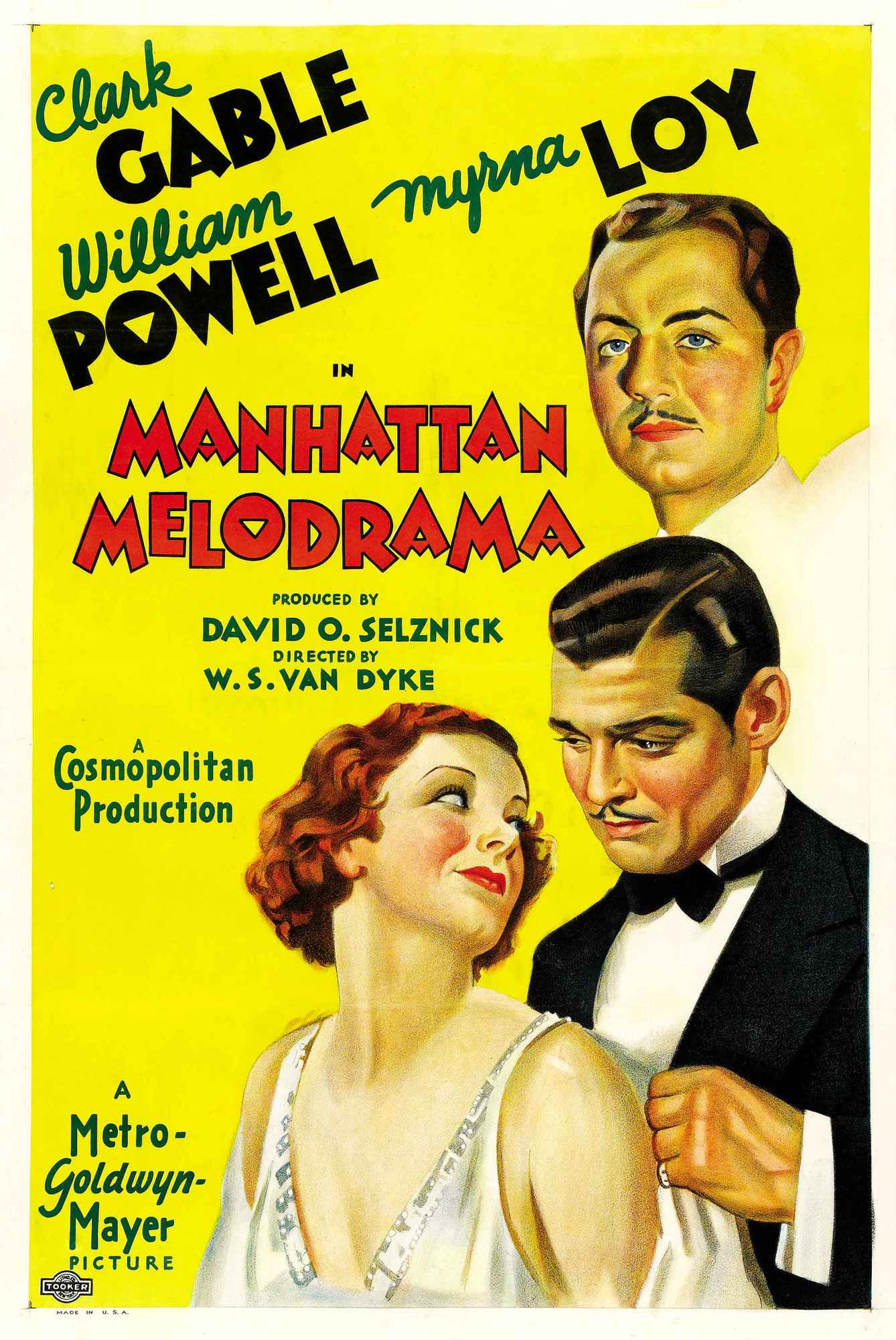
- Theatrical release poster
- Directed by: W. S. Van Dyke; George Cukor (uncredited)
- Screenplay by: Oliver H. P. Garrett; Joseph L. Mankiewicz; Donald Ogden Stewart (uncredited)
- Story by: Arthur Caesar
- Produced by: David O. Selznick
- Starring: Clark Gable; William Powell; Myrna Loy
- Cinematography: James Wong Howe
- Edited by: Ben Lewis
- Music by: William Axt
- Production companies: Cosmopolitan Productions; Metro-Goldwyn-Mayer
- Distributed by: Loew's Inc.
- Release date: May 4, 1934
- Running time: 93 minutes
- Country: United States
- Language: English
- Budget: $355,000
- Box office: $1.2 million

Manhattan Melodrama is a 1934 American pre-Code crime drama film directed by W. S. Van Dyke and starring Clark Gable, William Powell, and Myrna Loy. Mickey Rooney also appears in one of his earliest film roles. The film is based on a story by Arthur Caesar, who won the Academy Award for Best Original Story. It was also the first of Loy and Powell's fourteen screen pairings.

Notorious criminal John Dillinger attended a showing of the film at Chicago's Biograph Theater on July 22, 1934. After leaving the theater, he was shot to death by federal agents. Loy was among those who expressed distaste at the studio's willingness to exploit this event for the financial benefit of the film. Scenes from Manhattan Melodrama, in addition to Dillinger's death, are depicted in the 2009 film Public Enemies starring Johnny Depp as Dillinger.

== Plot ==
On June 15, 1904, the steamboat General Slocum catches fire and sinks in New York's East River. Two boys, Blackie Gallagher and Jim Wade, are rescued by a priest, Father Joe, but are orphaned by the disaster. They are taken in by another survivor, Poppa Rosen, who lost his young son in the sinking. The boys live with Poppa Rosen for a short while; then Rosen, a Russian Jew, is trampled to death by a policeman's horse after he heckles Leon Trotsky at a Communist rally and a melee breaks out.

The boys remain close friends, though their lives diverge. Studious from the very beginning, Jim gets his law degree and eventually becomes the assistant district attorney. Blackie is a cheerful, happy-go-lucky kid who loves to throw dice and trick other kids out of their money. He becomes the owner of a fancy, albeit illegal, casino. Though regularly "raided", the cops have been paid off and the casino resumes business immediately after they leave. Blackie's girlfriend Eleanor loves him, but pleads with him in vain to marry her and give up his dangerous life.

Jim is elected district attorney. Blackie, always a supporter and admirer of Jim, knowing the latter's incorruptibility, arranges to meet him for a celebration, but something comes up, and he sends Eleanor to keep Jim company at the Cotton Club until he can join them. Jim and Eleanor talk the night away. Afterward, she gives Blackie one last chance to marry her and settle down. When Blackie refuses, she leaves him.

Months later, Jim and Eleanor meet by chance and start keeping company (she informs Jim that she has not seen Blackie for months). Meanwhile, Blackie, who acknowledges that he is a changed man (due to Eleanor's having left him), coldly kills Manny Arnold for not paying his gambling debts. Jim summons him to his office, where he tells him that he and Eleanor are going to get married. Blackie is sincerely happy for both of them. Jim also informs his friend that he is a suspect in the Arnold murder. However, there is no real evidence, so the crime goes unsolved.

Jim invites him to be the best man at his wedding. Blackie initially accepts but later sends a telegram begging off. After returning from his honeymoon, Jim runs for governor of New York. Snow, who had been his chief assistant until Jim fired him for corruption, threatens to tell reporters that Jim covered up for Blackie in the Arnold case. Although untrue, this would cost Jim a close race for the governorship. By chance, Blackie and Eleanor meet at the horse track. Eleanor tells Blackie about Snow. Blackie shoots Snow dead in a washroom of Madison Square Garden during a hockey game. A beggar who pretends to be blind sees him leave the scene of the crime. Jim has no choice but to prosecute Blackie. Blackie is convicted and sentenced to death.

Jim wins the election, partly because the public sees that he is so honest he is prosecuting his own childhood friend. He is sworn in, and at a hearing regarding commutation of the sentence, he denies the application, stating that the voters have a right to expect that he not ever be "corrupted by money, influence, or even by my own personal feelings." Eleanor tries to get him to commute the sentence to life imprisonment, revealing Blackie's motive for killing Snow, but that only makes things worse. When Jim remains steadfast, Eleanor leaves him. At the last moment, Jim hurries to Sing Sing Prison and meets Blackie, together with Father Joe, who is now the prison's chaplain. Jim finally offers to commute the death sentence, but Blackie turns him down, admitting to the murder of Manny Arnold. He then says he doesn't want Jim to ruin his own career so Blackie can "rot in this hole" for the rest of his life. Father Joe leads Blackie to the electric chair while saying last rites.

A few days later, Jim calls a special joint session of the New York Legislature. He reveals how the murder helped him win the election, and how at the end he compromised his principles and was willing to commute his friend's sentence. He then tenders his resignation. When he leaves, Eleanor is waiting for him. She tells him that she was wrong about him, and they leave together to start a new life.

== Cast ==
- Clark Gable as Edward J. "Blackie" Gallagher
- William Powell as Jim Wade
- Myrna Loy as Eleanor Packer
- Leo Carrillo as Father Joe
- Nat Pendleton as Spud
- George Sidney as Poppa Rosen
- Isabel Jewell as Annabelle
- Muriel Evans as Tootsie Malone
- Thomas E. Jackson as Asst. Dist. Atty. Richard Snow
- Isabelle Keith as Miss Adams, Jim's Secretary
- Frank Conroy as Blackie's Lawyer
- Noel Madison as Manny Arnold
- Jimmy Butler as Jim Wade as a Boy
- Mickey Rooney as Blackie as a Boy
- Shirley Ross as Black Cotton Club Singer
- George Irving as Campaign Manager (uncredited)
- Leonid Kinskey as Trotskyite (uncredited)
- Edward Van Sloan as Yacht Capt. Swenson (uncredited)

Cast notes

- Manhattan Melodrama was the only film that Clark Gable and William Powell made together, but both men were married to Carole Lombard. Lombard was married to Powell when she made her only film with Clark Gable, No Man of Her Own.

== Release ==
Manhattan Melodrama premiered in the United States on May 4, 1934.

=== John Dillinger murder ===
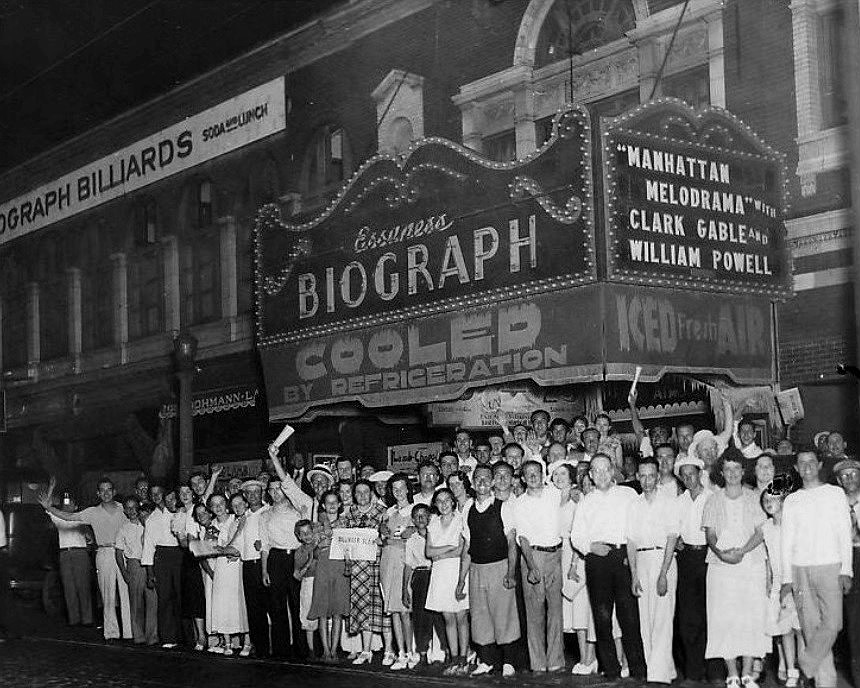
The crowd at Chicago's Biograph Theater on July 22, 1934, shortly after John Dillinger was killed there by law enforcement officers.

The film attracted attention when notorious criminal John Dillinger was shot to death by federal agents outside Chicago's Biograph Theater on July 22, 1934 after attending a screening of the film.

Scenes from Manhattan Melodrama, in addition to Dillinger's death, are depicted in the 2009 biographical crime film Public Enemies starring Johnny Depp as Dillinger.

== Reception ==
Filmed relatively quickly and with a modest budget, Manhattan Melodrama was expected to return a profit but not to capture the imagination of the public. The picture's smash hit success surprised the studio and made major stars of screen veterans Myrna Loy and William Powell in the first of their fourteen screen pairings, and also solidified the success of MGM's most popular male lead, Clark Gable. The film has a Harlem nightclub scene featuring Shirley Ross in blackface singing a song Richard Rodgers and Lorenz Hart called "The Bad in Every Man." After the film's release, the lyrics were rewritten by Lorenz Hart as the retitled "Blue Moon". On review aggregator website Rotten Tomatoes, it holds an approval rating of 80% with an average rating of 7.04/10, based on 15 contemporary reviews.

According to MGM records, the film earned $735,000 in the U.S. and Canada and $498,000 elsewhere for a profit of $415,000.

== Radio adaptation ==
Manhattan Melodrama was presented on Lux Radio Theatre on September 9, 1940. William Powell, Myrna Loy and Don Ameche starred in the adaptation.

== See also ==
- General Slocum disaster
