= Louis Piquett =

20th-century American lawyer

Louis Piquett (Piquette)
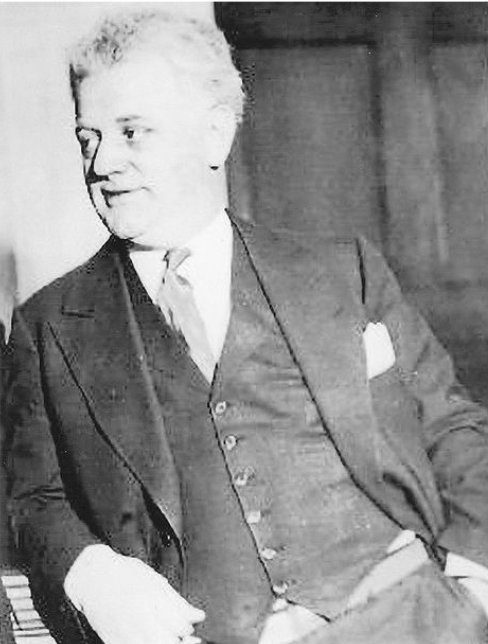
- Born: September 24, 1884; Benton, Wisconsin, U.S.
- Died: December 12, 1951 (aged 67); Chicago, Illinois, U.S.
- Resting place: Hillside Cemetery (Platteville, Wisconsin)
- Occupation: Lawyer
- Status: Pardoned in 1951
- Convictions: Acquitted; Convicted
- Criminal charges: Harboring a fugitive (John Dillinger); Harboring a fugitive (Homer Van Meter)
- Penalty: 2 years and $10,000 fine

Louis Piquett (September 24, 1884 – December 12, 1951) was an American lawyer notable for defending John Dillinger. He was also a prosecutor for the city of Chicago. He is depicted by Peter Gerety in the 2009 movie Public Enemies.

== Early career ==
Piquett was a bartender active in Chicago Democratic politics. He studied law in night school. By 1915, he was chief clerk to the city prosecutor of Chicago. In the early 1920s, he was appointed city prosecutor by Mayor William Hale Thompson. He was indicted in 1923 on corruption charges, which were subsequently dropped.

By the summer of 1923, Piquett was in private practice in Chicago. In August 1923, for instance, he represented James J. McGrath, who owned films showing a boxing match between Tommy Gibbons and Jack Dempsey. Piquett won a decision from the circuit court which stated that the films were neither immoral nor obscene, and enjoined the police from interfering with their exhibition.

In 1931, Piquett unsuccessfully defended Leo Vincent Brothers against charges of murdering Chicago Tribune reporter Jake Lingle.

== Defense of Dillinger ==
In 1934, Piquett defended Dillinger in Crown Point, Indiana. He successfully argued that Dillinger should be allowed to appear in court free of shackles and without armed guards present. After Dillinger's dramatic pre-trial escape, an investigation by the state of Indiana revealed Piquett's complicity.

== Criminal charges ==
In January 1935, Piquett was charged with harboring the fugitive Dillinger and of conspiring with a number of others, including two doctors, to hide Dillinger while he underwent plastic surgery. He was acquitted after less than four hours of deliberation. During this trial he was called "the brains of the Dillinger mob."

In May 1935, he was convicted of harboring Dillinger associate Homer Van Meter, fined $10,000, and served time in the United States Penitentiary, Leavenworth. Piquett appealed his sentence all the way up to the Supreme Court of the United States, which denied certiorari in 1936. He was pardoned for this crime in 1951 by President Harry Truman.

== Early life ==
Born in Benton, Wisconsin, he hopped trains to California sometime around 1900 where he enrolled in Stanford University and was a stand out on the track team. He then had a successful stint as a professional boxer, using the prize money to open a cigar shop on Market Street in San Francisco. Wiped out by the 1906 San Francisco earthquake and subsequent fire he returned home to Wisconsin, married and moved to Chicago.

== Death ==
He died in Chicago in 1951. He is buried in Hillside cemetery in Platteville, Wisconsin.
