= Jay Robert Nash =

American writer (1937–2024)

Jay Robert Nash (November 26, 1937 – April 22, 2024) was an American author of more than 80 true crime books once called the "world's foremost encyclopedist of crime." Among Nash's crime anthologies are Encyclopedia of Western Lawmen and Outlaws, Look For the Woman, Bloodletters and Badmen, and The Great Pictorial History of World Crime. He also compiled his exhaustive research of criminal behaviour into a CD-ROM entitled Jay Robert Nash's True Crime Database.

While Nash's books won a number of "Best Reference" citations from the American Library Association, his works were also criticized for including misinformation or wrong data.

== Biography ==
Born in Indianapolis to Jay Robert Nash II and Jerrie Lynne (Kosur), Nash grew up in Green Bay, Wisconsin. Nash's father was a newspaperman who died fighting in the Pacific during World War II while his mother was a cabaret singer in her youth.

After attending Marquette University, Nash served with the United States Army in Europe the mid-1950s. He started his career working for publications in Milwaukee before coming to Chicago in 1962. In 1983 he married Judy Anetsberger, a lawyer, and they had a son, Jay Robert Nash IV.

Nash died of lung cancer on April 22, 2024, at the age of 86.

A 1981 story in The Chicago Tribune stated that "(Nash's) most intriguing creation is himself. Pugnacious, diminutive, and dapper in the attire of a 1920s gangster, his heroic fantasies have made him a Chicago legend — especially among the patrons of his favorite saloons."

== Critical Response ==
Nash won Best Reference citations from the American Library Association for four of his books, including Darkest Hours. In 2008, The Library of America selected Nash's story "The Turner-Stompanato Affair" for inclusion in its two-century retrospective of American True Crime.

However, Nash's books were also criticized for containing a number of errors "ranging from somewhat minor ... to more egregious." Reviewers noted that in his books, "many quotes and scenarios are not clearly substantiated." Richard Maxwell Brown, writing in the Journal of American History, noted that one of Nash's books contained "numerous errors, omissions, inconsistencies, and anomalies."

Nash also admitted his books are "seeded with information to detect any unauthorized use or duplication." According to Nash, the precise nature of these copyright traps may include incorrect information in otherwise factual entries, or wholly fictitious entries. Because of this and other errors found in his books, the Library Journal called Nash's work "fascinating yet flawed" and recommended that it be used only for background research.

As one reviewer wrote, the odd device of Nash seeding his books with disinformation was "somewhat reminiscent of mapmakers planting false cul-de-sacs on their maps but also renders his books problematic unless one verifies their facts in other sources."

== CBS lawsuit ==
Nash once filed a lawsuit against CBS for producing an episode of Simon & Simon with a plotline based around his notion that bank robber John Dillinger was not killed by the FBI in 1934 (Nash focused two separate books on his theory). His claim of copyright infringement was dismissed on summary judgment, a ruling upheld by an appeals court. The court compared Nash's writing to "speculative works representing themselves as fact" and concluded that he could not claim a copyright on his analysis of historical facts, only his expression of them. The court added that Nash should not be surprised at the result, pointing out, "His own books are largely fresh expositions of facts looked up in other people's books."

== Legal threats against Wikipedia ==
In 2006, Nash claimed that Wikipedia has violated his copyright by either copying or plagiarizing his content for many of Wikipedia's crime-related articles. At the time Nash said he was compiling a list of examples in which Wikipedia allegedly infringed on his work, although such a list was not made public.

Wikipedia founder Jimmy Wales said that he would be happy to remove any instances of copying if pointed out. He added that, in reference to the concerns that others have raised about Nash's research, that Nash's books are unfit as sources for Wikipedia regardless of any legal issues. "Nash's work should not be relied upon," Wales concluded, on the grounds that the deliberate insertion of errors "makes it unsuitable as a reference anyway."

== Selected bibliography ==
- Hustlers and Con Men: An Anecdotal History of the Confidence Man and His Games published by M. Evans & Company (1976)
- Darkest Hours: A Narrative Encyclopedia of Worldwide Disasters from Ancient Times to the Present published by Pocket Books (1977).
- Among the Missing: An Anecdoctal History of Missing Persons from 1800 to the Present (1978), Rowman and Littlefield.
- Ballistics
- Look for the Woman: A Narrative Encyclopedia of Female Poisoners, Kidnappers, Thieves, Extortionists, Terrorists, Swindlers and Spies from Elizabethan Times to the Present published by M. Evans & Company (1986).
- The Mafia Diaries published by Dell Publishing Company (1986)
- The Motion Picture Guide published by Cinebooks during the 1970s and early '80s. This was a twelve volume reference work.
- The Motion Picture Guide published by Cinebooks beginning in 1985, this is an annual book.
- Murder Among the Rich & Famous published by Random House (1988)
- People to See
- The Dark Fountain published by Signet (1988).
- World Encyclopedia of 20th Century Murder published by Paragon House Publishers (1992)
- World Encyclopedia of Organized Crime published by Paragon House Publishers (April 1992) ISBN 1-55778-508-2
- Dictionary of Crime: Criminal Injustice, Criminology, & Law Enforcement published by Marlowe & Company (1994).
- The Dillinger Dossier
- Bloodletters and Bad Men: Lucky Luciano to Charles Manson; A Who's Who of Vile Men (and Women) Wanted For Every Crime in the Book published by M. Evans and Company, Inc., revised and updated edition (1995).
- Citizen Hoover
- Concise Encyclopedia of the Civil War
- Crime Movie Quiz Book
- Crime Scene Investigations
- Cyber Crime
- Spies: A Narrative Encyclopedia of Dirty Tricks and Double Dealing from Biblical Times to Today published by M. Evans and Company, Inc. (1997)
- Terrorism In The 20th Century: A Narrative Encyclopedia from the Anarchists, Through the Weathermen, to the Unabomber
- The Great Pictorial History of World Crime published by Scarecrow Press (2004)
- Encyclopedia Of Civil War Battles published by Scarecrow Press (2005).
- Encyclopedia of Western Lawmen & Outlaws
- Fingerprint Identification And Classification
- Forensic Anthropology
- Forensic DNA Analysis
- Forensic Psychology
- Forensic Serology
- Forensic Toxicology
- Forensic Pathology
