= Biograph Theater =

Theater in Chicago, US, opened 1915

Biograph Theatre
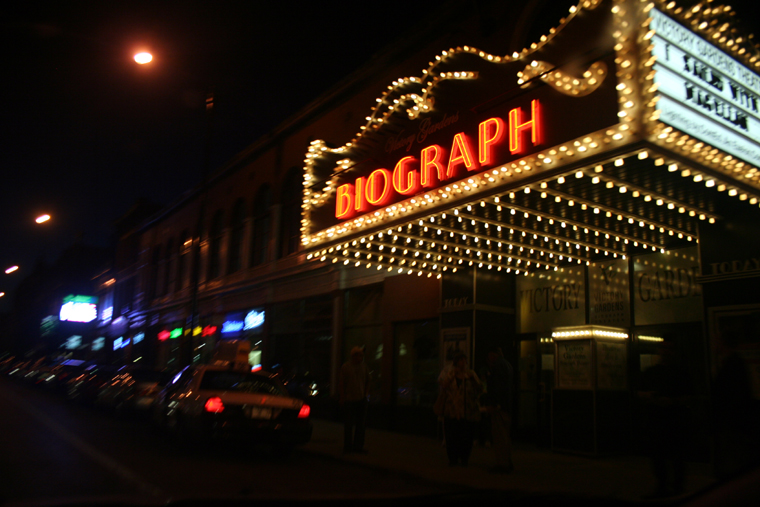
- The Biograph Theater in June 2007
- Interactive map of Biograph Theatre
- Address: 2433 N. Lincoln Avenue; Chicago, Illinois; United States
- Owner: Victory Gardens Theater
- Capacity: Začek McVay: 299; Richard Christiansen: 109
- Type: Regional theater

Construction
- Opened: 1914
- Rebuilt: 2006
- Architect: Samuel Crowen

Website
- www.victorygardens.org
- Biograph Theater
- U.S. National Register of Historic Places
- Chicago Landmark
- Location within Chicago Location within Illinois Location within the United States
- Coordinates: 41°55′35″N 87°38′59″W
- Built: 1915
- Architectural style: Classical Revival
- NRHP reference No.: 84000934

Significant dates
- Added to NRHP: May 17, 1984
- Designated CHICL: March 28, 2001

The Biograph Theater on Lincoln Avenue in the Lincoln Park neighborhood of Chicago, Illinois, was originally a movie theater but now presents live productions. It gained early notoriety as the location where bank robber John Dillinger was leaving when he was shot down by FBI agents, after he watched a gangster movie there on July 22, 1934. The theater is on the National Register of Historic Places and was designated a Chicago Landmark on March 28, 2001.

== History ==
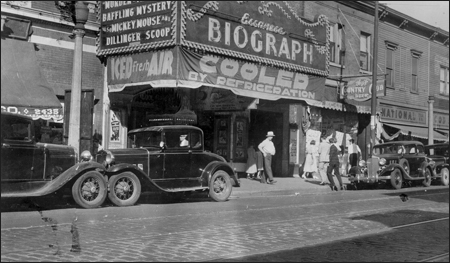
1934 FBI photograph of the Biograph, soon after the shooting of Dillinger

Designed by architect Samuel N. Crowen in 1914 and built by the Henry Ericsson Construction Company, the Biograph has many of the distinguishing characteristics of movie houses of the period, including a storefront-width lobby, recessed entrance, free-standing ticket booth, and canopy marquee. The building is finished with red pressed brick and white-glazed terra cotta.

On July 22, 1934, after attending the film Manhattan Melodrama with brothel madam Ana Cumpănaș, also known as Anna Sage (or "The Woman in Red"), and Polly Hamilton, John Dillinger was shot dead outside the Biograph by FBI agents led by Melvin Purvis, when he attempted to pull a pistol and flee into the crowd after he saw them. Dillinger's whereabouts had been leaked to the FBI by Cumpănaș under the threat of deportation back to her birthplace of Romania.

From the 1970s through the 1980s, the Biograph was the center in Chicago for midnight showings, with raucous costumed cult following, of Rocky Horror Picture Show.

In July 2004, after 90 years as a movie theater under various owners, Chicago's Victory Gardens Theater announced it had purchased the Biograph for use as a live venue. The theater was completely renovated by architect Daniel P. Coffey, who constructed a proscenium-thrust stage and seating for 299 people. A grand staircase, which was part of the original structure, was restored to lead up to the building's second floor, housing a studio theater seating 135 people and an adjacent rehearsal/multiple-use space. The $11 million project for the new theater, styled the Victory Gardens at the Biograph, was completed in the fall of 2006. The new stage is 30 feet (9.1 m) deep and 32 feet (9.8 m) wide, with 16 feet (4.9 m) of wing space on either side. There is an 8-foot (2.4 m) trap space below the stage. There is limited fly space above the stage. There are two dressing rooms and a green room behind the stage. The lobby is wider than in the movie theater days, and the restrooms have been expanded.

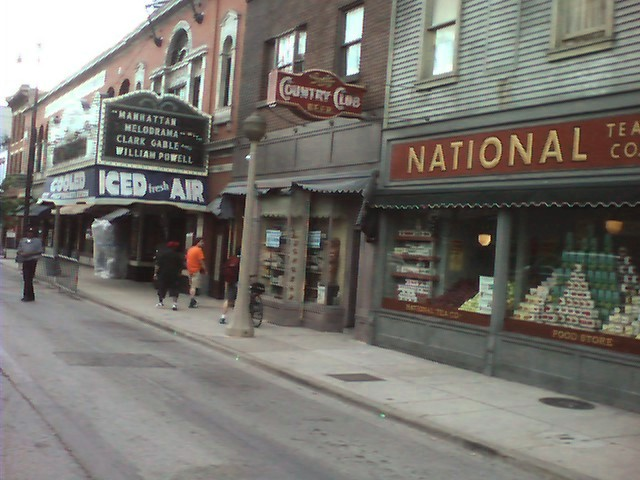
The Biograph Theater and adjoining businesses in 2008 redressed to appear as it did in 1934 for the film Public Enemies.

The facades of the theater and adjoining businesses were redressed to appear as they did in 1934 for the 2009 film Public Enemies. The theater is also shown in the 2000 film High Fidelity, in which the gunfight with Dillinger is erroneously said to have taken place inside the theater.
