= John Dillinger =

American bank robber (1903–1934)

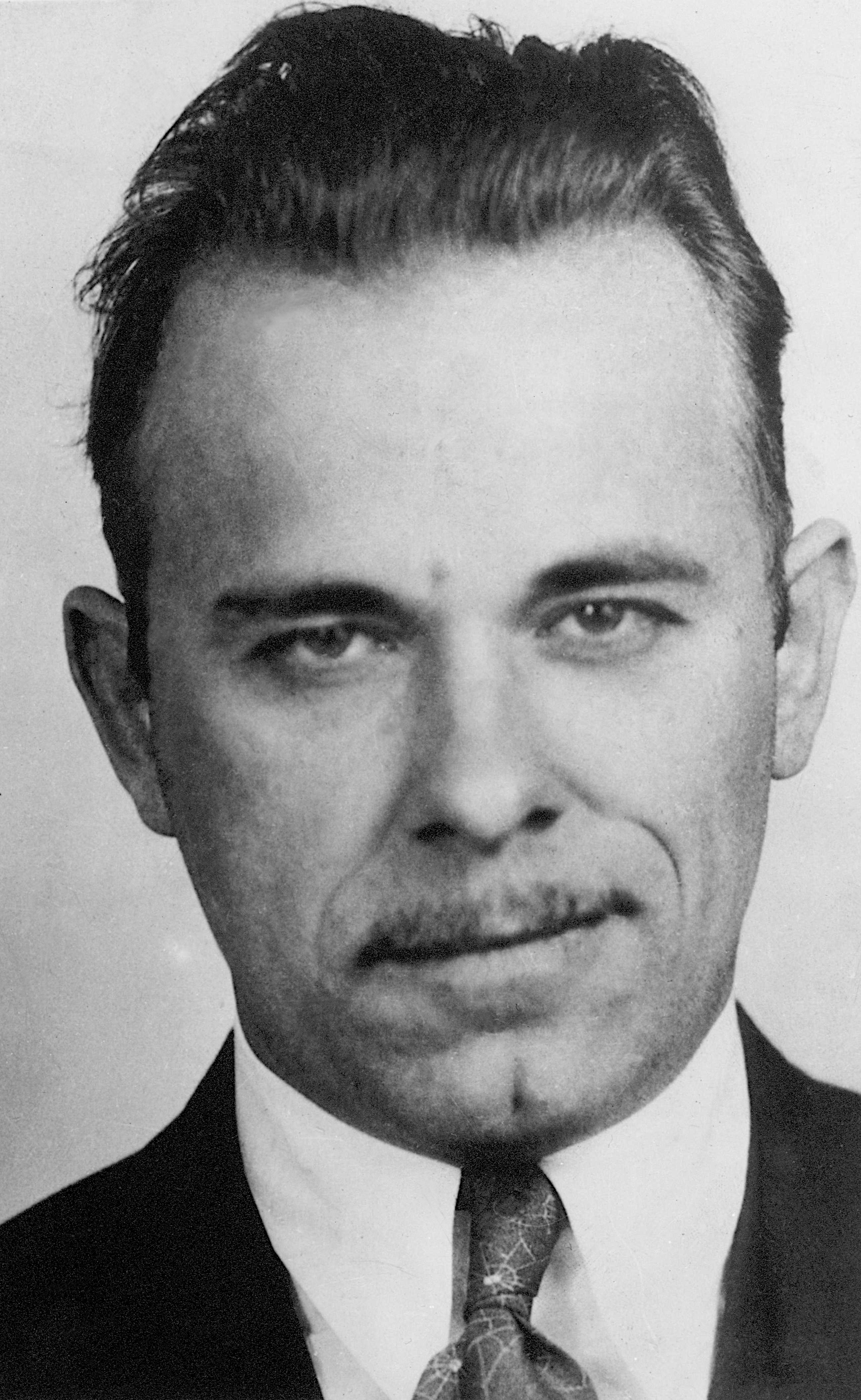
- Mug shot of Dillinger
- Born: John Herbert Dillinger; June 22, 1903; Indianapolis, Indiana, U.S.
- Died: July 22, 1934 (aged 31); Chicago, Illinois, U.S.
- Cause of death: Gunshot wounds
- Resting place: Crown Hill Cemetery and Arboretum, Section 44, Lot 94; 39.822109°N 86.16484°W
- Criminal charges: Desertion from US Navy, bank robbery, assault, assault of an officer, grand theft auto
- Criminal penalty: Imprisonment from 1924 to 1933
- Spouse(s): Beryl Hovious (m. 1924; div. 1929) Billie Frechette (common law relationship); Polly Hamilton (common law relationship)

John Herbert Dillinger (/ˈdɪlɪndʒər/; June 22, 1903 – July 22, 1934) was an American gangster during the Great Depression. He commanded the Dillinger Gang, which was accused of robbing twenty-four banks and four police stations. Dillinger was imprisoned several times and escaped twice. He was charged with but not convicted of the murder of East Chicago, Indiana, police officer William O'Malley, who shot Dillinger in his bulletproof vest during a shootout; it was the only time Dillinger was charged with homicide.

Dillinger courted publicity. The media printed exaggerated accounts of his bravado and colorful personality, and described him as a Robin Hood-type figure. In response, J. Edgar Hoover, director of the Bureau of Investigation (BOI), used Dillinger as justification to evolve the BOI into the Federal Bureau of Investigation (FBI), developing more sophisticated investigative techniques as weapons against organized crime.

After evading police in four states for almost a year, Dillinger was wounded in a gunfight and went to his father's home to recover. His Michigan hideout was in Charlevoix, Michigan. He returned to Chicago in July 1934 and sought refuge in a brothel owned by Ana Cumpănaș, who later informed authorities of his whereabouts. On July 22, 1934, local and federal law-enforcement officers closed in on the Biograph Theater. When BOI agents moved to arrest Dillinger as he left the theater, he attempted to flee but was fatally shot; the lethal use of force by the agents would eventually be ruled justifiable homicide.

== Early life ==
=== Family and background ===
John Dillinger was born on June 22, 1903, at 2053 Cooper Street, Indianapolis, Indiana, the younger of two children born to John Wilson Dillinger (1864–1943) and Mary Ellen "Mollie" Lancaster (1870–1907). His paternal grandfather, Mathias Dillinger, immigrated to the U.S. in 1854 from Gisingen, a village of Wallerfangen (near Dillingen/Saar) in the Saar Region of Prussia due to poverty and fears of conscription.

Dillinger's parents had married on August 23, 1887. His father was a grocer and reportedly a harsh man. In an interview with reporters, Dillinger said that his father was firm in his discipline and believed in the adage "spare the rod and spoil the child". His mother died in 1907, just before his fourth birthday. That same year, Dillinger's older sister Audrey married Emmett "Fred" Hancock, in a marriage that produced seven children. She cared for her brother for several years until their father remarried in 1912 to Elizabeth "Lizzie" Fields (1878–1933) with whom he had three children.

=== Formative years and marriage ===
As a teenager, Dillinger was frequently in trouble for fighting and petty theft. He was also noted for his "bewildering personality" and bullying of smaller children. He quit school to work in an Indianapolis machine shop. Fearing that the city was corrupting his son, Dillinger's father relocated the family to Mooresville, Indiana, in 1921. Despite his new rural life, however, Dillinger's wild and rebellious behavior was unchanged. In 1922 he was arrested for auto theft, and his relationship with his father deteriorated.

In 1923, Dillinger's troubles resulted in him enlisting in the United States Navy, where he was a petty officer third class machinery repairman aboard the battleship USS Utah. He deserted when his ship was docked in Boston a few months into his service, and was eventually dishonorably discharged.

Dillinger returned to Mooresville, where he met Beryl Ethel Hovious. The two married on April 12, 1924. Despite Dillinger's attempts to settle down, he found it difficult finding a job. He subsequently began planning a robbery with his friend, ex-convict Ed Singleton. Hovious divorced Dillinger on June 20, 1929, while he was incarcerated, which Dillinger later admitted broke his heart and further drove him to crime.

Dillinger and Singleton robbed a Mooresville grocery store, stealing $50 (about $917 in 2024). During the robbery, Dillinger struck a victim on the head with a machine bolt wrapped in a cloth, and carried a gun which, although it discharged, hit no one. While leaving the scene, the criminals were seen by a minister who recognized the two men and reported them to the police. They were arrested the next day. Singleton pleaded not guilty, but after Dillinger's father (the local Mooresville deacon) discussed the matter with Morgan County prosecutor Omar O'Harrow, his father convinced Dillinger to confess to the crime and plead guilty without retaining a defense attorney.

Dillinger was convicted of assault and battery with intent to rob, and conspiracy to commit a felony. He expected a lenient sentence of probation as a result of his father's discussion with O'Harrow but was sentenced instead to ten to twenty years in prison. Dillinger's father told reporters he regretted his advice and was appalled by the sentence, unsuccessfully pleading with the judge to shorten the sentence. En route to Mooresville to testify against Singleton, Dillinger briefly escaped his captors but was apprehended within a few minutes. Singleton had a change of venue and was sentenced to a jail term of two to fourteen years. He was killed on September 2, 1937, when he fell asleep on railroad tracks while drunk.

== Prison time ==
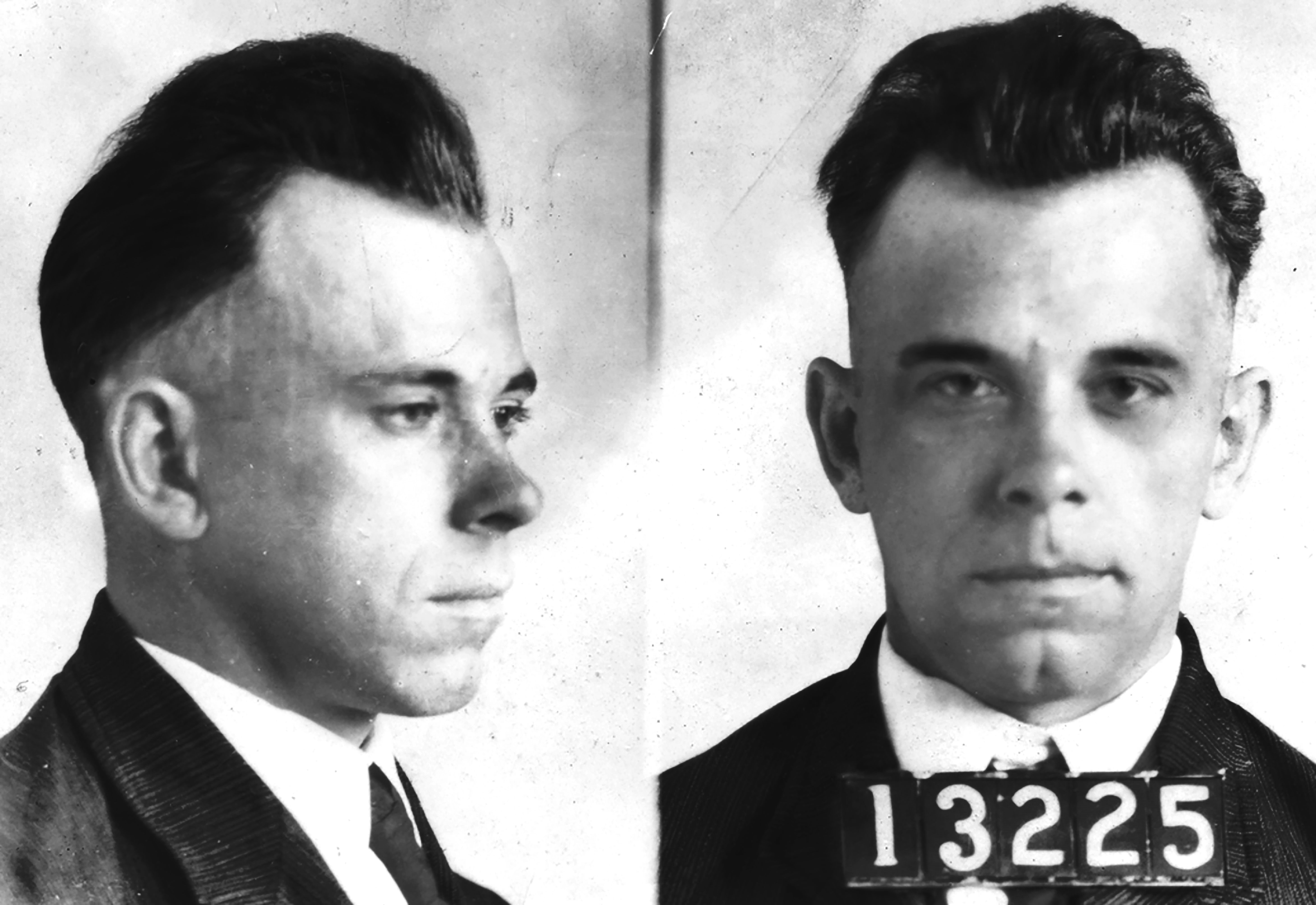
John Dillinger 1924 Mugshot

Incarcerated at Indiana Reformatory and Indiana State Prison between 1924 and 1933, Dillinger developed a criminal lifestyle. Upon being admitted to prison, he was quoted as saying, "I will be the meanest bastard you ever saw when I get out of here." His physical examination at the prison showed that he had gonorrhea, treatment of which at the time was painful. He became resentful toward society because of his long prison sentence and befriended other criminals, including seasoned bank robbers Harry "Pete" Pierpont, Charles Makley, Russell Clark and Homer Van Meter, who taught Dillinger how to be a successful criminal. The men planned heists that they would commit upon release. Dillinger also studied Herman Lamm's meticulous bank-robbing system and used it extensively throughout his criminal career.

Dillinger's father began a public campaign to have him released and was able to obtain 188 signatures on a petition. On May 10, 1933, after serving nine and a half years, Dillinger was paroled. Released at the lowest point of the Great Depression, Dillinger, with little prospect of finding employment, immediately returned to crime.

On June 21, 1933, Dillinger committed his first bank robbery, stealing $10,000 ($241,000 in 2024) from a bank in New Carlisle, Ohio. On August 14 he robbed a bank in Bluffton, Ohio. Tracked by police from Dayton, he was captured and later transferred to Allen County jail in Lima to be indicted in connection to the Bluffton robbery. After searching him before imprisoning him, the police discovered a document which appeared to be a prison escape plan. They demanded Dillinger tell them what the document meant, but he refused.

Earlier, Dillinger had helped conceive a plan to enable the escape of Pierpont, Clark and six other prison acquaintances. He had friends smuggle guns into their cells, which they used to escape four days after Dillinger's capture. The group that formed, known as "the First Dillinger Gang", consisted of Pierpont, Clark, Makley, Ed Shouse, Harry Copeland and John "Red" Hamilton, a member of the Herman Lamm Gang. Pierpont, Clark and Makley arrived in Lima on October 12, 1933, where they impersonated Indiana State Police officers, claiming they had come to extradite Dillinger to Indiana. When the sheriff, Jess Sarber, asked for their credentials, Pierpont shot Sarber dead, then released Dillinger from his house. The four men escaped back to Indiana, where they joined the rest of the gang.

== Bank robberies ==
Dillinger is known to have participated with the Dillinger Gang in twelve bank robberies, between June 21, 1933, and June 30, 1934.

It is a popular adage that he refused to plan robberies in the town of Anderson, Indiana. It was a busy factory town that had an abundance of railroad tracks, and there was too great a risk of getting stopped by a train and caught by authorities.

== Evelyn Frechette ==
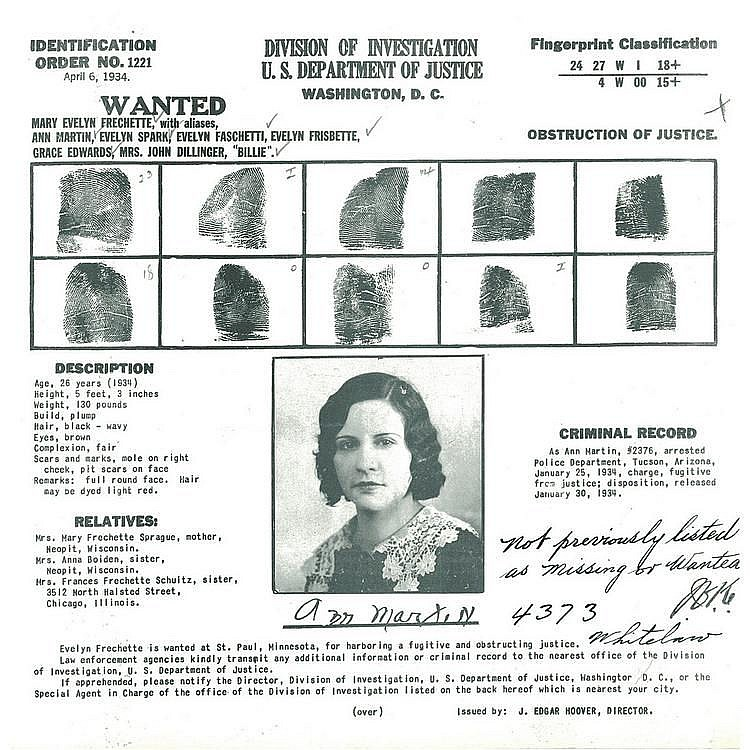
FBI wanted order Evelyn Frechette

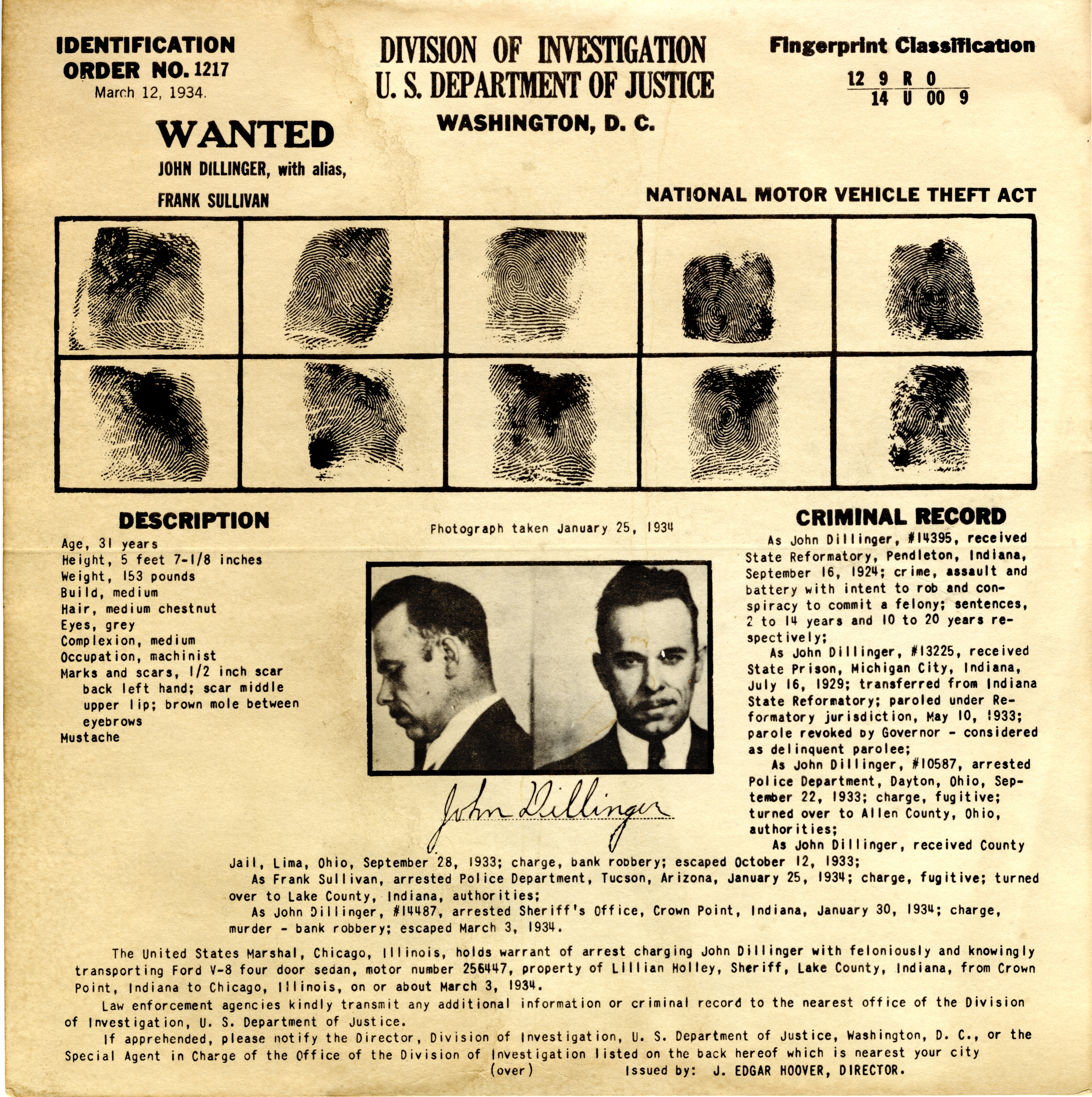
FBI wanted Poster John Herbert Dillinger

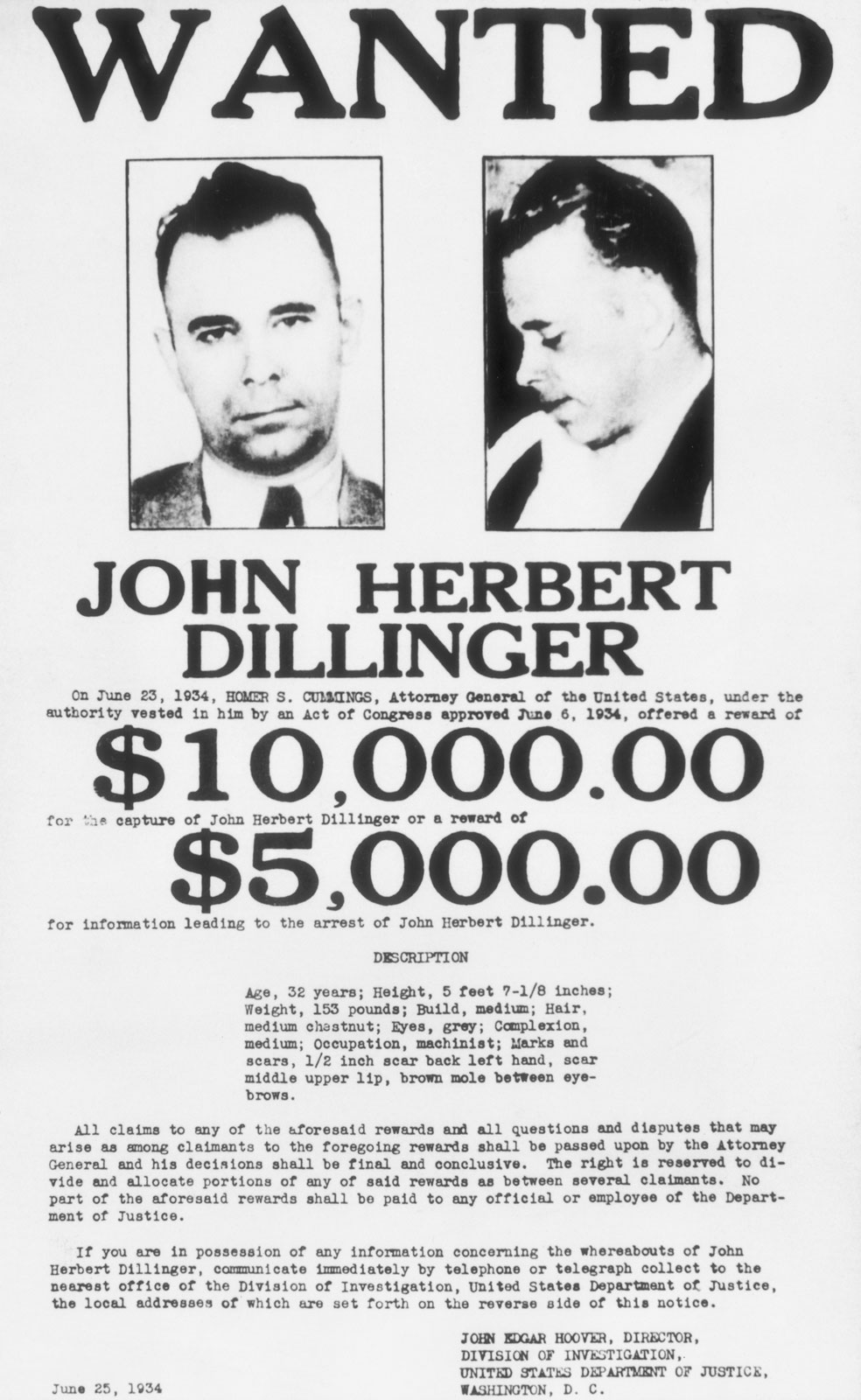
Dillinger wanted Poster after his escape from Crown Point Indiana

Evelyn "Billie" Frechette met Dillinger in October 1933, and they began a relationship the following month. After Dillinger's death, Billie was offered money for her story and wrote a memoir for the Chicago Herald- Examiner in August 1934.

== Escape from Crown Point, Indiana ==
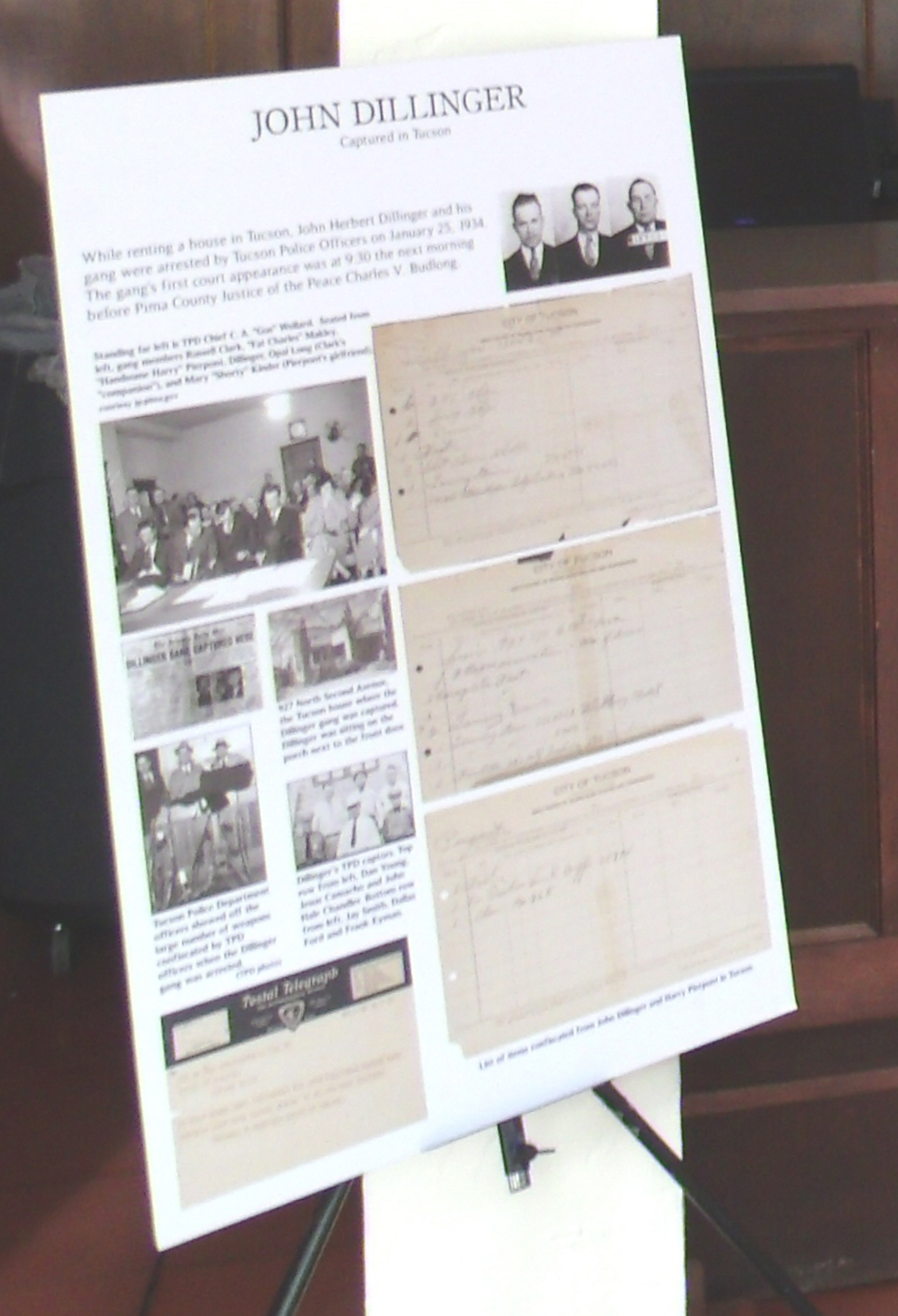
Display of newspaper clippings of the capture of John Dillinger and his gang in the old lobby of the Hotel Congress

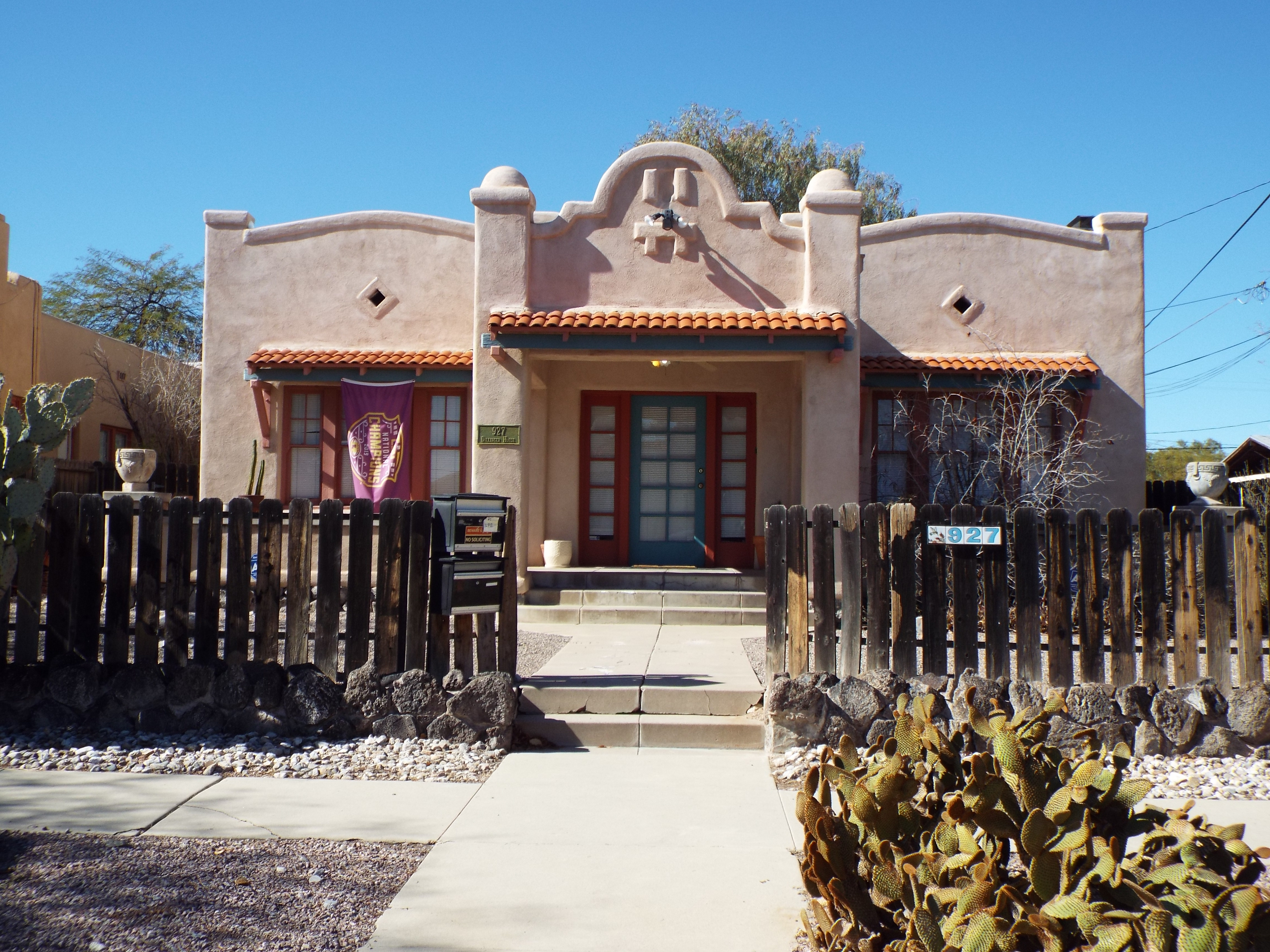
The John Dillinger House in Tucson, Arizona

On January 25, 1934, Dillinger and his gang were captured in Tucson, Arizona. Dillinger was extradited to Indiana and escorted back by Matt Leach, the Chief of the Indiana State Police. He was taken to Lake County jail in Crown Point, Indiana, and jailed on charges of murdering police officer William O'Malley, who was killed during a Dillinger gang bank robbery in East Chicago on January 15, 1934.

Local police boasted to area newspapers that the jail was escape-proof and had posted extra guards as a further precaution. However, on Saturday, March 3, 1934, Dillinger was able to escape during morning exercises with fifteen other inmates. Dillinger produced a pistol, catching deputies and guards by surprise, and was able to escape without firing a shot. Almost immediately afterwards conjecture began about whether the gun Dillinger displayed was real or not. According to Deputy Ernest Blunk, Dillinger had escaped using a real pistol. FBI files, on the other hand, indicated that Dillinger used a fake pistol carved out of wood. Sam Cahoon, a trustee whom Dillinger took hostage in the jail, also believed Dillinger had carved out the gun using a razor and some shelving in his cell. In another version, according to an unpublished interview with Dillinger's attorney, Louis Piquett, investigator Art O'Leary claimed to have snuck the gun in himself.

On March 16, Herbert Youngblood, who escaped from Crown Point alongside Dillinger, was shot dead by police in Port Huron, Michigan. Deputy Sheriff Charles Cavanaugh was mortally wounded in the gunfight and later died. Before his death, Youngblood told officers Dillinger was in Port Huron, and officers immediately began a fruitless search for the escaped man. An Indiana newspaper reported that Youngblood later retracted the story and said he had not known where Dillinger had been at that time, as he had parted with him soon after their escape.

Dillinger was indicted by a grand jury, and the Bureau of Investigation (a precursor of the Federal Bureau of Investigation) organized a nationwide manhunt for him. Just hours after his escape from Lake County jail, Dillinger reunited with his girlfriend, Billie Frechette.

According to Frechette's trial testimony, Dillinger stayed with her for "almost two weeks". However, the two had actually traveled to the Twin Cities and taken lodgings at the Santa Monica Apartments in Minneapolis, Minnesota, where they stayed for fifteen days. Dillinger then met Hamilton, and the two mustered a new gang consisting of Baby Face Nelson's gang, including Nelson, Homer Van Meter, Tommy Carroll and Eddie Green.

Three days after Dillinger's escape from Crown Point, the second Gang robbed a bank in Sioux Falls, South Dakota. A week later they robbed First National Bank in Mason City, Iowa.

== Lincoln Court Apartments shootout ==
=== Setting ===
On Tuesday, March 20, 1934, Dillinger and Frechette relocated into the Lincoln Court Apartments in St. Paul, Minnesota, using the aliases "Mr. & Mrs. Carl T. Hellman" in Apartment 303. Daisy Coffey, the landlord, testified at Frechette's trial that she spent most evenings during Dillinger's stay observing what was happening. On March 30, Coffey went to the FBI's St. Paul field office to file a report, including information about the couple's new Hudson sedan parked in the garage behind the apartments.

=== Surveillance ===
As a result of Coffey's tip, the building was surveilled by two agents, Rufus Coulter and Rusty Nalls, but they saw nothing unusual because the blinds were drawn. The next morning, at approximately 10:15 a.m., Nalls circled around the block looking for the Hudson but observed nothing. He parked, first on Lincoln Avenue (the north side of the apartments), then on the west side of Lexington Avenue, at the northwest corner of Lexington and Lincoln, and remained in his car while watching Coulter and St. Paul Police detective Henry Cummings pull up, park and enter the building. Ten minutes later, by Nalls's estimate, Van Meter parked a green Ford coupe on the north side of the apartment building.

=== Shootout ===
Meanwhile, Coulter and Cummings knocked on the door of Apartment 303. Frechette answered, opening the door two to three inches. She said she was not dressed and to come back. Coulter told her they would wait. After waiting two to three minutes, Coulter went to the basement apartment of the caretakers, Louis and Margaret Meidlinger, and asked to use the telephone to call the Bureau. He quickly returned to Cummings, and the two of them waited for Frechette to open the door. Van Meter then appeared in the hall and asked Coulter if his name was Johnson. Coulter said it was not, and as Van Meter passed on to the landing of the third floor, Coulter asked him for a name. Van Meter replied, "I am a soap salesman." Asked where his samples were, Van Meter said they were in his car. Coulter asked if he had any credentials. Van Meter said "no", and continued down the stairs. Coulter waited ten to twenty seconds, then followed Van Meter. As Coulter reached the lobby on the ground floor, Van Meter began shooting at him. Coulter hastily fled outside, chased by Van Meter. Van Meter ran back into the front entrance.

Recognizing Van Meter, Nalls pointed out the Ford to Coulter and told him to disable it. Coulter shot out the rear left tire. While Coulter stayed with Van Meter's Ford, Nalls went to the corner drugstore and telephoned the local police, then the Bureau's St. Paul office, but could not get through because both lines were busy. Van Meter, meanwhile, escaped by hopping on a passing coal truck.

Frechette, in her harboring trial testimony, said that she told Dillinger that the police had shown up after speaking to Cummings. Upon hearing Van Meter firing at Coulter, Dillinger began shooting through the door with a Thompson submachine gun, sending Cummings scrambling for cover. Dillinger then stepped out and fired another burst at Cummings. Cummings shot back with a revolver, but quickly ran out of ammunition. He hit Dillinger in the left calf with one of his five shots. He then hastily retreated down the stairs to the front entrance. Once Cummings retreated, Dillinger and Frechette hurried down the stairs, exited through the back door and drove away in the Hudson.

=== Aftermath ===
After the shootout, Dillinger and Frechette drove to Eddie Green's apartment in Minneapolis. Green telephoned his associate Dr. Clayton E. May at his office at 712 Masonic Temple in downtown Minneapolis (still extant). With Green, his wife Beth and Frechette following in Green's car, the doctor drove Dillinger to an apartment belonging to Augusta Salt, who had been providing nursing services and a bed for May's illicit patients, whom he could not risk seeing at his regular office, for several years. May treated Dillinger's wound with antiseptics. Green visited Dillinger on Monday, April 2, just hours before Green was mortally wounded by the Bureau in St. Paul. Dillinger convalesced at May's until Wednesday, April 4. May was promised $500 for his services but received nothing.

== Return to Mooresville ==
After the events in Minneapolis, Dillinger and Frechette traveled to Mooresville to visit Dillinger's father. Friday, April 6, 1934, was spent contacting family members, particularly his half-brother Hubert Dillinger. On April 6, John and Hubert Dillinger left Mooresville at about 8:00 p.m. and proceeded to Leipsic, Ohio (approximately 210 miles away), to see Joseph and Lena Pierpont, parents of Prohibition Era gangster, Harry Pierpont. The Pierponts were not home, so the two headed back to Mooresville around midnight.

On April 7 at approximately 3:30 a.m., they rammed a car driven by Mr. and Mrs. Joseph Manning near Noblesville, Indiana, after Hubert fell asleep behind the wheel. They crashed through a farm fence and about 200 feet into the woods. Both men made it back to the Mooresville farm. Swarms of police showed up at the accident scene within hours. Found in the car were maps, a machine gun magazine, a length of rope, and a bullwhip. According to Hubert, his brother planned to pay a visit with the bullwhip to his former one-armed "shyster" lawyer at Crown Point, Joseph Ryan, who had run off with his retainer after being replaced by Louis Piquett. At about 10:30 a.m. on April 7, Billie, Hubert and Hubert's wife purchased a black four-door Ford V8, registering it in the name of Mrs. Fred Penfield (Billie Frechette). At 2:30 p.m., Billie and Hubert picked up the V8 and returned to Mooresville.

On Sunday, April 8, the Dillingers enjoyed a family picnic while the FBI had the farm under surveillance nearby. Later in the afternoon, suspecting they were being watched (agents J. L. Geraghty and T. J. Donegan were cruising in the vicinity in their car), the group left in separate cars. Billie drove the new Ford V8, with two of Dillinger's nieces, Mary Hancock in the front seat and Alberta Hancock in the back. Dillinger was on the floor of the car. He was later seen, but not recognized, by Donegan and Geraghty. Eventually, Norman, driving the V8, proceeded with Dillinger and Billie to Chicago, where they separated from Norman.

The next afternoon, Monday, April 9, Dillinger had an appointment at a tavern at 416 North State Street. Sensing trouble, Billie went in first. She was promptly arrested by agents, but refused to reveal Dillinger's whereabouts. Dillinger was waiting in his car outside the tavern and then drove off unnoticed. The two never saw each other again.

Dillinger reportedly became despondent after Billie was arrested. The other gang members tried to talk him out of rescuing her, but Van Meter encouraged him by saying that he knew where they could find bulletproof vests. That Friday morning, late at night, Dillinger and Van Meter took a hostage, Warsaw, Indiana police officer Judd Pittenger. They marched Pittenger at gunpoint into the police station, where they stole several more guns and bulletproof vests. After separating, Dillinger picked up Hamilton, who was recovering from the Mason City robbery. The two then traveled to the Upper Peninsula of Michigan, where they visited Hamilton's sister Anna Steve.

== Escape at Little Bohemia ==
The Bureau received a telephone call Sunday morning, April 22 that John Dillinger and several of his confederates were hiding out at a small vacation lodge called Little Bohemia near present-day Manitowish Waters, Wisconsin.

Dillinger and some of the gang were upstairs in the lodge and began shooting out the windows. While the BOI agents ducked for cover, Dillinger and his men fled from the back of the building. On foot, they reached a nearby resort, where they commandeered a car and woke its owner, Robert Johnson, forcing him to drive them roughly 60 miles before releasing him unharmed and ordering him to keep walking until morning; his abandoned Model A Ford was later recovered in St. Paul, Minnesota.

== Hiding in Chicago ==
By July 1934, Dillinger had absconded, and the federal agents did not have any information about his whereabouts. He had, in fact, gone to Chicago where he used the alias of Jimmy Lawrence, a petty criminal from Wisconsin who bore a close resemblance to Dillinger. Working as a clerk, Dillinger found that, in a large metropolis like Chicago, he was able to live an anonymous existence for a while. What he did not realize was that the federal agents' dragnet happened to be based at Chicago. When the authorities found Dillinger's blood-spattered getaway car on a Chicago side street, they were positive that he was in the city.

== Plastic surgery ==
According to Art O'Leary, as early as March 1934, Dillinger expressed an interest in plastic surgery and had asked O'Leary to check with Piquett on such matters. At the end of April, Piquett paid a visit to his old friend Dr. Wilhelm Loeser. Loeser had practiced in Chicago for 27 years before being convicted under the Harrison Narcotic Act in 1931. He was sentenced to three years at Leavenworth, but was paroled early on December 7, 1932, with Piquett's help. He later testified that he performed facial surgery on himself and obliterated the fingerprint impressions on the tips of his fingers by the application of a caustic soda preparation. Piquett said Dillinger would have to pay $5,000 for the plastic surgery: $4,400 split between Piquett, Loeser and O'Leary, and $600 to Dr. Harold Cassidy, who would administer the anaesthetic. The procedure would be done at the home of Piquett's longtime friend, 67-year-old James Probasco, at the end of May.

On May 28, Loeser was picked up at his home at 7:30 p.m. by O'Leary and Cassidy. The three of them then drove to Probasco's place. Dillinger chose to have a general anaesthetic. Loeser later testified:

I asked him what work he wanted done. He wanted two warts (moles) removed on the right lower forehead between the eyes and one at the left angle, outer angle of the left eye; wanted a depression of the nose filled in; a scar; a large one to the left of the median line of the upper lip excised, wanted his dimples removed and wanted the angle of the mouth drawn up. He didn't say anything about the fingers that day to me.

Cassidy administered an overdose of ether, which caused Dillinger to suffocate. He began to turn blue and stopped breathing. Loeser pulled Dillinger's tongue out of his mouth with a pair of forceps, and at the same time forced both elbows into his ribs. Dillinger gasped and resumed breathing. The procedure continued with only a local anesthetic. Loeser removed several moles on Dillinger's forehead, made an incision in his nose and an incision in his chin and tied back both cheeks.

Loeser met with Piquett again on Saturday, June 2, with Piquett saying that more work was needed on Dillinger and that Van Meter now wanted the same work done to him. Also, both now wanted work done on their fingertips. The price for the fingerprint procedure would be $500 per hand or $100 a finger. Loeser used a mixture of nitric and hydrochloric acid—known commonly as aqua regia.

Loeser met O'Leary the next night at Clark and Wright at 8:30, and they once again drove to Probasco's. Present this evening were Dillinger, Van Meter, Probasco, Piquett, Cassidy, and Peggy Doyle, Probasco's girlfriend. Loeser testified that he worked for only about 30 minutes before O'Leary and Piquett left.

Loeser testified:

Cassidy and I worked on Dillinger and Van Meter simultaneously on June 3. While the work was being done, Dillinger and Van Meter changed off. The work that could be done while the patient was sitting up, that patient was in the sitting-room. The work that had to be done while the man was lying down, that patient was on the couch in the bedroom. They were changed back and forth according to the work to be done. The hands were sterilized, made aseptic with antiseptics, thoroughly washed with soap and water and used sterile gauze afterwards to keep them clean. Next, cutting instrument, knife was used to expose the lower skin ... in other words, take off the epidermis and expose the derma, then alternately the acid and the alkaloid was applied as was necessary to produce the desired results.

Minor work was done two nights later, Tuesday, June 5. Loeser made some small corrections first on Van Meter, then Dillinger. Loeser stated:

A man came in before I left, who I found out later was Baby Face Nelson. He came in with a drum of machine gun bullets under his arm, threw them on the bed or the couch in the bedroom, and started to talk to Van Meter. The two then motioned for Dillinger to come over and the three went back into the kitchen.

Peggy Doyle later told agents:

Dillinger and Van Meter resided at Probasco's home until the last week of June 1934; that on some occasions they would be away for a day or two, sometimes leaving separately, and on other occasions together; that at this time Van Meter usually parked his car in the rear of Probasco's residence outside the back fence; that she gathered that Dillinger was keeping company with a young woman who lived on the north side of Chicago, inasmuch as he would state upon leaving Probasco's home that he was going in the direction of Diversey Boulevard; that Van Meter apparently was not acquainted with Dillinger's friend, and she heard him warning Dillinger to be careful about striking up acquaintances with girls he knew nothing about; that Dillinger and Van Meter usually kept a machine gun in an open case under the piano in the parlor; that they also kept a shotgun under the parlor table.

O'Leary stated that Dillinger expressed dissatisfaction with the facial work that Loeser had performed on him. O'Leary said that, on another occasion, "that Probasco told him, 'the son of a bitch has gone out for one of his walks'; that he did not know when he would return; that Probasco raved about the craziness of Dillinger, stating that he was always going for walks and was likely to cause the authorities to locate the place where he was staying; that Probasco stated frankly on this occasion that he was afraid to have the man around".

Agents arrested Loeser at 1127 South Harvey, Oak Park, Illinois, on Tuesday, July 24. O'Leary returned from a family fishing trip on July 24, the day of Loeser's arrest, and had read in the newspapers that the Department of Justice was looking for two doctors and another man in connection with some plastic surgery that had been done on Dillinger. O'Leary left Chicago immediately, but returned two weeks later, learned that Loeser and others had been arrested, telephoned Piquett, who assured him everything was all right, then left again. He returned from St. Louis on August 25 and was promptly taken into custody.

On Friday, July 27, Probasco fell to his death from the 19th floor of the Bankers' Building in Chicago while in custody. On Thursday, August 23, Homer Van Meter was shot and killed in a dead-end alley in St. Paul by Tom Brown, former St. Paul police chief, and then-current chief Frank Cullen.

== Polly Hamilton ==
Rita "Polly" Hamilton was a teenage runaway from Fargo, North Dakota. She met Ana Ivanova Akalieva (Ana Cumpănaș; a.k.a. Ana Sage or "The Woman in Red") in Gary, Indiana, and worked periodically as a prostitute in Ana's brothel until marrying Gary police officer Roy O. Keele in 1929. They divorced in March 1933.

In the summer of 1934, the now 26-year-old Hamilton was a waitress in Chicago at the S&S Sandwich Shop located at 1209½ Wilson Avenue. She had remained friends with Sage and was sharing living space with Sage and Sage's 24-year-old son, Steve, at 2858 Clark Street.

Dillinger and Hamilton, a Billie Frechette look-alike, met in June 1934 at the Barrel of Fun night club located at 4541 Wilson Avenue. Dillinger introduced himself as Jimmy Lawrence and said he was a clerk at the Board of Trade. They dated until Dillinger's death at the Biograph Theater in July 1934.

== Betrayal ==
Division of Investigations chief J. Edgar Hoover created a special task force headquartered in Chicago to locate Dillinger. On July 21, Ana Cumpănaș contacted the FBI, offering agents information on Dillinger in exchange for their help in preventing her deportation to Romania due to Cumpănaș' status as an "alien of low moral character". The FBI agreed to her terms, but she was later deported nonetheless. Cumpănaș revealed that Dillinger was spending time with another prostitute, Polly Hamilton, and that she and the couple were going to see a movie together on the next day. She agreed to wear an orange dress, so police could easily identify her. She was unsure which of two theaters they would attend, the Biograph or the Marbro.

On December 15, 1934, pardons were issued by Indiana Governor Harry G. Leslie for the offenses of which Ana Cumpănaș was convicted.

Cumpănaș stated that on Sunday afternoon, July 22, Dillinger asked her whether she wanted to go to the show with them (Polly and him).

She asked him what show was he going to see, and he said he would 'like to see the theater around the corner,' meaning the Biograph Theater. She stated she was unable to leave the house to inform Purvis or Martin about Dillinger's plans to attend the Biograph, but as they were going to have fried chicken for the evening meal, she told Polly she had nothing in which to fry the chicken and was going to the store to get some butter; that while at the store she called Mr. Purvis and informed him of Dillinger's plans to attend the Biograph that evening, at the same time obtaining the butter. She then returned to the house so Polly would not be suspicious that she went out to call anyone.

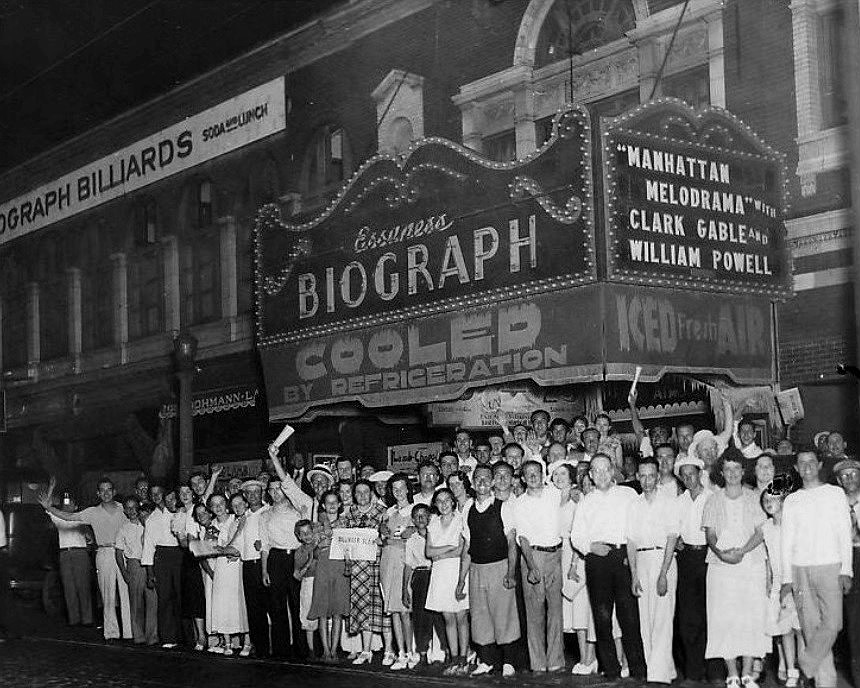
The crowd at Chicago's Biograph Theater on July 22, 1934, shortly after Dillinger was killed there by FBI agents

A team of federal agents and officers from police forces from outside of Chicago was formed, along with a very small number of Chicago police officers. Among them was East Chicago Police Department Sergeant Martin Zarkovich, the officer to whom Cumpănaș had acted as a criminal informant. At the time, federal officials felt that the Chicago Police Department was thoroughly corrupt and could not be trusted; Hoover and Purvis also wanted more of the credit. Not wanting to take the risk of another embarrassing escape of Dillinger, the police were divided into two groups. On Sunday, one team was sent to the Marbro Theater on the city's west side, while another team surrounded the Biograph Theater at 2433 N. Lincoln Avenue on the north side.

== Shooting at the Biograph Theater and death ==
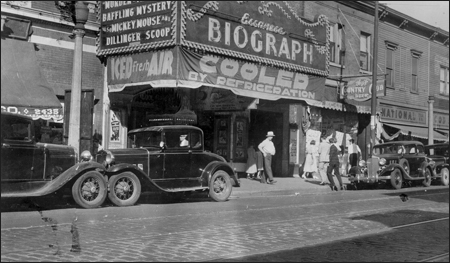
FBI photograph of the Biograph Theater taken July 28, 1934, six days after the shooting, the only night Murder in Trinidad played

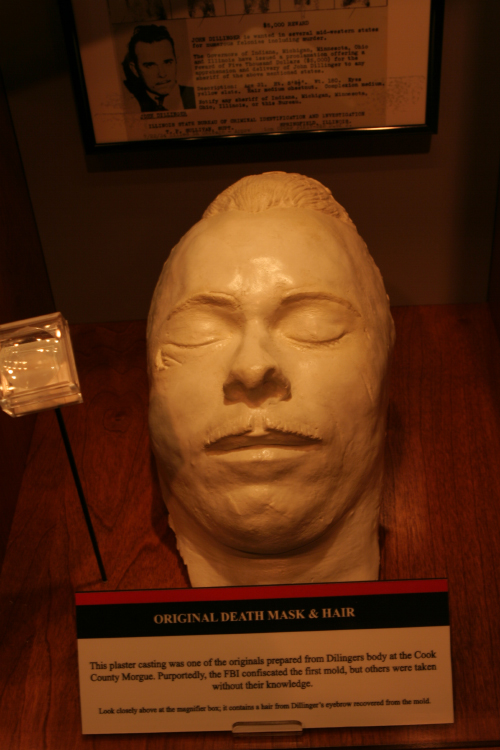
A Dillinger death mask made from an original mold, one of four made. A second is on display at the Alcatraz East museum in Pigeon Forge, Tennessee. Note the bullet exit mark below the right eye.

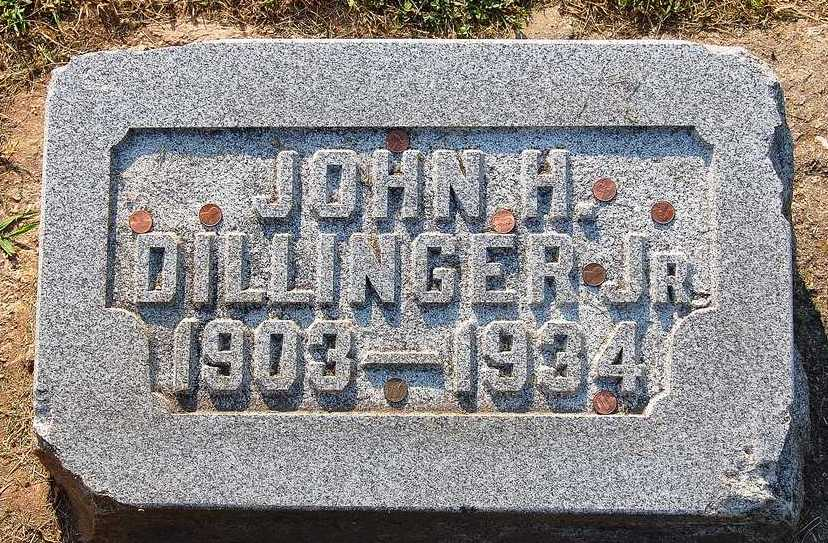
Grave at Crown Hill Cemetery, Indianapolis, Indiana – at least the fourth marker to be replaced since 1934 due to souvenir seekers chipping away at them

At approximately 8:30 p.m., Sage, Hamilton, and Dillinger were observed entering the Biograph Theater, which was showing the crime drama Manhattan Melodrama, featuring Clark Gable, Myrna Loy, and William Powell. During the stakeout, the Biograph's manager thought the agents were criminals preparing for a robbery. He called the Chicago police, who responded but then had to be waved off by the federal agents, who told them that they were on a stakeout for an important target.

When the movie ended, Purvis stood by the front door and signaled Dillinger's exit by lighting a cigar. Both he and the other agents reported that Dillinger turned his head and looked directly at the agent as he walked by, glanced across the street, then moved ahead of his female companions, reached into his pocket but failed to extract his Colt M1903, and ran into a nearby alley. Other accounts stated Dillinger ignored a command to surrender, whipped out his gun, then headed for the alley. Agents already had the alley closed off.

Three men pursued Dillinger into the alley and fired. Clarence Hurt shot twice, Charles Winstead three times, and Herman Hollis once. Dillinger was hit from behind and fell face first to the ground.

Dillinger was struck four times, with two bullets grazing him and one causing a superficial wound to the right side. The fatal bullet entered through the back of his neck, severed the spinal cord, passed into his brain and exited just under the right eye, severing two sets of veins and arteries. An ambulance was summoned, although it was soon apparent Dillinger had died from the gunshot wounds; he was officially pronounced dead at Alexian Brothers Hospital. According to investigators, Dillinger died without saying a word. Winstead was later thought to have fired the fatal shot, and as a consequence received a personal letter of commendation from J. Edgar Hoover.

Two female bystanders, Theresa Paulas and Etta Natalsky, were wounded. Dillinger bumped into Natalsky just as the shooting started. Natalsky was shot and was taken to Columbus Hospital.

Dillinger was shot and killed by the special agents on July 22, 1934, at approximately 10:40 p.m, according to a New York Times report the next day. Dillinger's death came only two months after the deaths of fellow notorious criminals Bonnie and Clyde. There were reports of people dipping their handkerchiefs and skirts into the pool of blood that had formed, as Dillinger lay in the alley, as keepsakes: "Souvenir hunters madly dipped newspapers in the blood that stained the pavement. Handkerchiefs were whipped out and used to mop up the blood."

== Funeral ==
Dillinger's body was available for public display at the Cook County morgue. An estimated 15,000 people viewed the corpse over a day and a half. As many as four death masks were also made.

Dillinger is buried at Crown Hill Cemetery in Indianapolis. Dillinger's gravestone has been replaced several times because of vandalism by people chipping off pieces as souvenirs. Hilton Crouch (1903–1976), an associate of Dillinger's on some early heists, is buried only a few yards to the west.

== See also ==
- List of the Great Depression-era outlaws
- The Dillinger Dossier
