= Bottoms Gang =

American street gang

- Founded: c. 1905
- Founded by: Frank Hussey; Anthony Foley
- Founding location: St. Louis, Missouri, United States
- Years active: 1905-1917
- Territory: St. Louis, Missouri, United States
- Ethnicity: Irish-American
- Membership (est.): 50-60 (est. 1909)
- Criminal activities: Organized crime
- Rivals: Egan's Rats; St. Louis Police Department

The Bottoms Gang was an American street gang in St. Louis, Missouri during the early 20th century. Their main criminal activities included voter intimidation, armed robbery, assault, illegal lottery, and murder. The gang's members were primarily Irish-American, with a handful of German and Missouri Creole members. The Bottoms Gang had a meteoric rise and fall in St. Louis's underworld. They feuded with the larger Egan's Rats gang and became notorious for going out of their way to attack members of the St. Louis Police Department. They made up for their lack of numbers with extreme violence. Crippled by arrests and murders, the Bottoms Gang had ceased to exist by the time America entered World War I.

== History ==
The Bottoms Gang had their roots in the political gangs that infested St. Louis city wards at the beginning of the 20th century. One of the most powerful was headed by John "Bad Jack" Williams, a former detective turned gangster who acted as an underworld liaison for Democratic political boss "Colonel" Ed Butler. Bad Jack Williams's crew was headquartered at a saloon at the corner of Nineteenth and Chestnut streets in a neighborhood of rickety tenements, saloons, brothels, and gambling dens. This rough district ran north of Union Station to about Cass Avenue. At a slightly lower elevation than the surrounding area, it was alternately known as the "Bad Lands" or the "Bottoms". It was from this latter nickname that the future Bottoms Gang would obtain its moniker.

By 1904, Missouri attorney general and future governor Joseph Folk had smashed the Butler Machine and with it the Williams Gang. Most of its members were either imprisoned or killed. One of the only survivors of Bad Jack's Williams' inner circle was 25-year-old Frank Hussey, a rarity as one of the city's only gangsters to have attended college; he majored in political science and business at St. Louis University. That year, Hussey had been elected to the St. Louis House of Delegates at the Democratic Party in the Twenty-Second Ward. Not unlike other St. Louis political bosses, he began using local street toughs to help enforce his will. One of his key associates was his half-brother Lawrence "Lawler" Daley, who was active in local politics as well; Daley served as a member of both the Missouri State and St. Louis city Democratic committees.

Most street-level members of the Bottoms Gang grew up in the Twenty-Second Ward. Although only twenty years old, their leader Anthony Foley was known as one of the most feared street fighters in the Bottoms. Some of his friends included Edward "Red" McAuliffe, Richard McLaughlin, Beverly Brown, Cornelius "Connie" Sullivan, Wesley "Red" Simons, John Cotty, and the three Carroll brothers; Pete, Eddie, and John. These young men inaugurated a reign of terror on the streets on the Twenty-Second starting in 1905. Crimes like burglary, assault, armed robbery, gang-rape, and murder were legion. While his men made a name of themselves on the street, Frank Hussey was becoming a force to be reckoned with in the political spectrum. During one 1906 speech at the House of Delegates, Hussey approached brewing magnate August Busch in order to convince him to stop holding up the passage of a bill. After giving a long, threatening speech to the delegates, police finally had to drag Frank Hussey out of the place. Busch was said to have admired his pluck.

The Bottoms Gang also had substantial profits coming in from the numbers game, an illegal lottery prevalent in the black neighborhoods adjoining the Bottoms. Lawler Daley controlled this racket with an iron fist and oversaw the two main wheels, "Little Joe" and "Mobile". Daley's operation was headquartered at the Hibernia Literary and Social Club at 2320 Olive Street, which also served as a hangout for the Bottoms gang members.

The number-one enemy of the Bottoms Gang was the larger, more powerful Egan's Rats gang. Frank Hussey had hated its leaders, Thomas "Snake" Kinney and Tom Egan, for years. Hussey had been shot and nearly killed in a street fight with members of the Rats (then named the Kinney Gang) in November 1900. Frank's gunshot wound to the abdomen had never healed properly and would occasionally re-open and bleed. It was the ultimate goal of Hussey and Lawler Daley to unseat the Kinney/Egan combine as the dominant Democratic force in the city of St. Louis. The Bottoms Gang marched into the Fifteenth Ward and openly confronted the Rats during the Democratic primary day of October 6, 1906. Members of both gangs brawled with each other at the polls all day.

While Frank Hussey hated the Egan Gang, Tony Foley was waging war against the St. Louis Police Department. He and his friends had grown up mistrusting the police, and Foley's hatred for them tripled after his kid brother Tim was shot dead while burglarizing a newsstand in December 1906. Tony was convinced that the cops had let Tim Foley's killer escape justice. On the night of February 10, 1907, Tony and several of his friends attacked and nearly killed Patrolman Patrick Stapleton. near the corner of Twenty-third and Franklin streets. Foley was later interviewed by the St. Louis Post-Dispatch and claimed that Patrolman Stapleton was a liar and a "four-flusher". Tony Foley would eventually be convicted of assault and sent to prison.

By the beginning of 1907, Tom Egan began using his contacts within the police force to turn up the heat on the rival Bottoms Gang. Their policy racket had been subjected to a series of raids in the last weeks of 1906. On the night of January 15, 1907, members of both gangs met in a peace conference at the Jolly Five Club, located at 1505 Morgan Street. After the meeting concluded, Tom Egan shot and mortally wounded an old enemy of his, Willie Gagel. Several weeks later on March 2, after police pressure from the Gagel murder and Stapleton assault died down, the Bottoms Gang met at 20 North Eleventh Street to draw up a new political club charter. Two members of the crew got into a drunken fight and Rex McDonald ended up shot to death.

In the ensuing months, the Bottoms Gang became a runaway freight train. Often fueled by alcohol and/or cocaine, the boys attacked, robbed, and pillaged across the Twenty-Second Ward. Frank Hussey, ostensibly a politician, often personally led his men into action. Residents usually kept their mouth shut out of fear. City policemen who tried to stop them were usually beaten senseless by the swarms of gangsters. One such incident, in the early morning hours of August 2, 1907, resulted in a running gun battle across the Bad Lands between the gangsters and the police. One of the pursuing officers and an innocent bystander were wounded in the gunplay.

Perhaps the most reckless deed attributed to the Bottoms Gang occurred on the morning of April 14, 1908. Eddie Carroll led a half-dozen of their number to the police's Jefferson Club at dawn. Finding no cops on the premises, the boys broke all the building's windows. At 9 o'clock, the Bottoms gangsters pulled up to St. Louis City Hall's Market Street entrance in an expensive coach. They charged into the building, shouting obscenities while brandishing revolvers and cracking snake whips at passerby. They headed for the office of Lewis Marks, superintendent of the Water Tap and Motor Department. Marks had recently fired Carroll from his cushy job. After seeing that their quarry was gone, Eddie Carroll snarled, "De guy wot we wuz looking for ain't here." The gangsters were arrested soon after while "refueling" at a nearby saloon.

Due to police pressure, they had relocated their headquarters to a converted church now named the West End Athletic Club at Twenty-Second and Washington streets. On the night of January 17, 1909, the place was packed with members of the gang drinking and singing. Patrolman John Hutton had told them several times to keep the noise down, which led to a confrontation where several members of the gang attempted to waylay and shoot him. Connie Sullivan shot Patrolman Hutton twice during the struggle. While Hutton survived his wounds, he was left permanently disabled. The state of Missouri intervened at this point, and several members of the gang were arrested and sent to prison, including Connie Sullivan. Frank Hussey, who had been on the scene that night, fled to Springfield, Illinois. He, Bev Brown, and Charles Naughton were arrested and extradited a short time later. While Hussey escaped criminal charges from the shooting of Patrolman John Hutton, his political career was essentially finished. Frank Hussey would die suddenly on August 3, 1911, from a series of hemorrhages.

The Bottoms Gang never recovered from the convictions of 1909. They diminished to a minor street gang in comparison to Egan's Rats. Older members, like Tony Foley and Bev Brown, retired from street rackets and went into the saloon business. A splinter group of the Bottoms Gang became known as the "Nixie Fighters" because of their penchant for fighting police officers. The two main leaders of this group, Edward Devine and Charles von der Ahe, were murdered by Egan gunmen in the fall of 1911. The remaining members of the Bottoms Gang were either locked up, killed, or cast their lots with other criminal organizations.

By 1913, what was left of the crew was led by Wesley "Red" Simons. He and others used Tony Foley's saloon at Twenty-Third and Olive streets as a base of operations. It was here that Red Simons shot and killed fellow gangster Emmett Carroll on March 31, 1913, in a fight over a woman. A bartender and sneak thief named Henry Zang insisted on testifying against Simons, despite a slew of threats against his life. The day of Red Simons's trial, March 2, 1914, the gang boss was accorded a special detail of detectives to protect him at the Municipal Courts Building (there had been a recent rash of gang-related murders at St. Louis courthouses). The star witness, Henry Zang, had no official protection other than a .38 revolver hidden on his person. Both men ran into each other in James Mooney's saloon at 1233 Chestnut Street during the court's lunch break that day. Zang later claimed that Simons had threatened him and that he shot him to death in self-defense. The coroner's jury agreed, as Henry Zang was not charged with killing Red Simons.

In the summer of 1916, what was left of the old Bottoms Gang gathered at Charles "Cap" Troll's lid club (after hours drinking establishment) the Typo Press Club in the rear of 712 Pine Street. It was here that they became embroiled in a final gang war with their old nemesis, Egan's Rats.

The roots of this strife lay with Egan gunman named Harry "Cherries" Dunn, who blamed gang boss Tom Egan for letting his brother John go to an Illinois prison with little or no assistance. Cherries Dunn was a good friend of the current leader of the Bottoms Gang, Edward Schoenborn. After killing a few members of the Egan mob, Harry Dunn took refuge at the Typo Press. Four members of the Rats, led by Willie Egan himself, tracked down Dunn and killed him there on September 19, 1916. Eddie Schoenborn was shot dead three weeks later at the old saloon at 1233 Chestnut Street (now owned by Bev Brown). A tit-for-tat war ensued throughout the rest of the fall and into 1917. John "Pudgy" Dunn was released from prison and swore to kill every man connected with his brother's death. With the help of Bottoms gangster Dave Creely, Dunn succeeded in killing one of the triggermen, Frank "Gutter" Newman, on June 8, 1917. While all of Harry Dunn's murderers would indeed die violent deaths, the Bottoms Gang had evaporated by the end of the summer of 1917. A handful of the surviving members had relocated to the Soulard district where they fell in with a local mob known as the Chouteau Avenue Gang. Over the fullness of time, this crew would evolve into the Cuckoo Gang.

=== Aftermath ===
Most street-level members of the Bottoms Gang ended up either dead or serving long prison sentences. Very few of them had long-term success in the underworld.

Tony Foley would eventually become a well-known St. Louis gambling figure, running several roadhouse/casinos in St. Louis County. He would die in Nevada of natural causes in 1962. Beverly Brown owned and operated the first racing wire service for the city of St. Louis. While his business was forcibly seized by gangster Frank "Buster" Wortman in later years, he died a wealthy man in July 1949. Lawrence "Lawler" Daley remained active in St. Louis city politics until his death in 1936.

== Bibliography ==
- Waugh, Daniel. Egan's Rats: The Untold Story Of The Gang That Ruled Prohibition-era St. Louis. Nashville: Cumberland House, 2007. ISBN 978-1-58182-575-6
