= Walter Costello =

- Born: April 20, 1889; St. Louis, Missouri, U.S.
- Died: July 25, 1917 (aged 28); St. Louis, Missouri, U.S.
- Occupation: Gangster

Walter Costello (April 20, 1889 – July 25, 1917) was a St. Louis gangster and member of the Egan's Rats.

Born and raised in North St. Louis to Irish-American parents, Costello joined Egan's Rats while in his late teens. He became known as a crack shot with a pistol. At the age of 19 in the summer of 1908, Costello was stabbed and nearly killed in a tavern brawl. Mere months later, Walter was shot and severely wounded during a fight in the rear of the Jolly Five Club at 1511 Morgan Street. During the melee, Costello had also shot Frederick Greenfield.

Walter's temper nearly got him killed once again two years later. On December 20, 1910, he was shot near the heart while trespassing in a rooming house at 1831 Franklin Avenue. His assailant was the building's housekeeper, Mrs. Kate Klutz. Despite the near fatal bullet wound, Costello still managed to stagger three blocks to the east to Willie Egan's saloon and call for a taxicab to take him to the hospital. Mrs. Klutz fled St. Louis in fear of the gangsters, and Costello recovered fully from his wounds.

After his three brushes with death, Walter Costello was known in gangland circles to lead a "charmed life." He grew to be Willie Egan's bodyguard and was never without two pistols on his person at all times. Walter also served as a St. Louis City Deputy Constable to Judge Andrew Gazzolo, thereby giving him permission to carry his pistols and even make arrests if he so desired. Costello was one of two men who shot and killed dangerous former Egan hoodlum Harry "Cherries" Dunn at the Typo Press Club at 712 Pine Street on September 19, 1916. Dunn had been murdered in retaliation for the killings of Egan gangsters William "Skippy" Rohan and Harry Romani.

Harry Dunn's brother John swore to kill everyone connected to his brother's murder. The Typo Press Club shooting touched off a war between the Egan's Rats and the rival Bottoms Gang. A few weeks after Cherries' murder, on October 4, 1916, Costello would lead the same hit team into Bev Brown's saloon at 1233 Chestnut Street, where Dunn's friend Eddie Schoenborn worked as a bartender. After a fake fight designed to get the tavern's owners to drop their guard, Costello and his men shot Schoenborn to death. Pudgy Dunn eventually succeeded in murdering one of Harry's killers, Frank "Gutter" Newman, on June 8, 1917, in front of a house at 3323 Lucas Avenue. Both Willie Egan and Walter Costello went everywhere armed and with their eyes peeled for rival gangsters.

The evening of July 24, 1917, found Egan and Costello letting off steam at the Falstaff Club at 11 North Sixth Street. With them were five other members of the gang, including Max Greenberg. As the night went on, the hoods got drunker and rowdier. Closing time came at 1 am and the gangsters refused to leave. While Walter Costello loudly demanded more drinks, the bartender stole away to a telephone and called the police. St. Louis City Patrolmen John Sipple and Fred Egenriether were soon on the scene. Willie Egan and his party finally walked outside to their automobile. The two police officers had to drag the intoxicated Costello out of the bar. When he got to the car, Costello quickly drew one of his pistols and aimed it at Patrolman Sipple. Willie Egan, shocked at this turn of events, grabbed his friend's arm and yelled, "Here, you fool! We're not killing policemen!" The words were just out of his mouth when Patrolman Egenriether shot Costello twice in the chest. One of his bullets penetrated Walter's heart and killed him almost instantly. Another of the Rats, Edward "Red" Giebe, then screamed in rage and pulled his own gun. Egan knocked his pistol away as well, and Giebe took off running before the officers could react. Walter Costello's killing was ruled justifiable homicide and Willie Egan commented, "I've saved a policeman's life tonight."
