= John Dunn (gangster) =

American criminal (1896–1937)

- Born: September 5, 1896; St. Louis, Missouri, U.S.
- Died: July 14, 1937 (aged 40); St. Louis, Missouri, U.S.
- Other name: Pudgy
- Occupation: Gangster

John "Pudgy" Dunn (September 5, 1896 – July 14, 1937) was a St. Louis gangster and member of Egan's Rats.

Born and raised in North St. Louis to Irish-American parents, John and his brother Harry, known as "Cherries", joined the Egan's Rats in their teens. John was nicknamed "Pudgy" because at the age of seventeen he carried 240 pounds on a 5'11" frame. John was known throughout the city as a dangerous brawler. While his older brother Harry was quick to use a gun to settle disputes, Pudgy often preferred to settle matters with his ham-like fists.

While in Chicago with his brother Harry on November 5, 1914, the two Dunn brothers shot and killed a gangster named Robert Koch. Both men were convinced that Koch had been sent up from St. Louis to specifically kill them. While Harry got off scot free, Pudgy was convicted and sentenced to an Illinois prison.

With John locked up, Harry went to great pains to get him free, even offering to snitch on his gang mates. Afraid that gang boss Tom Egan would find out about his disloyalty, Cherries Dunn became increasingly paranoid and killed people over trivial reasons, including William "Skippy" Rohan, a lifelong friend of Tom Egan's. Harry Dunn would eventually be killed by the Egan mob at the Typo Press Club on September 19, 1916.

Upon his parole in 1917, John "Pudgy" Dunn swore to kill Willie Egan and everyone else connected to his brother's murder, specifically the two triggermen, Walter Costello and Frank "Gutter" Newman. The gang war between the Egan's Rats and Bottoms Gang was raging in the summer of 1917 when Pudgy got even with one of Harry's killers, Gutter Newman, whom he shot and killed in front of the house at 3323 Lucas Avenue on June 8, 1917. Harry's other killer, Walter Costello, was shot and killed by St. Louis police a month later.

Willie Egan managed to temporarily escape Pudgy Dunn's wrath when John was busted for another murder in early January 1919. His parole was revoked and Dunn was sent back to Illinois to serve more time. However, Pudgy Dunn was free once again when Willie Egan was gunned down in front of his Franklin Avenue saloon on October 31, 1921. Dunn was named as a prime suspect, and the Egan gang themselves named members of the rival Hogan Gang as Egan's murderers.

By 1924, John "Pudgy" Dunn had relocated to Detroit, along with Fred "Killer" Burke, Gus Winkler, and other former members of the Egan's Rats. After years in prison and on the streets, Pudgy had turned quite volatile and trigger-happy. John was eventually convicted of killing a burglar named William Riley in January 1924 (while he was out on bond, Pudgy shot and nearly killed fellow gangster "Tennessee Slim" Hurley). Dunn was sentenced to 10 years in the Michigan State Penitentiary at Marquette.

Paroled on November 21, 1934, John "Pudgy" Dunn returned to St. Louis and rejoined the local mob. Dunn worked as a bouncer at East Side gambling joints like the Mounds Country Club and the Ringside Club. Pudgy was also a natural for labor racketeering, as he had positions in both the Central Trades and Labor Union and the Miscellaneous Hotel Workers Union. After an evening's work, Pudgy Dunn was entering his Goodfellow Avenue apartment building at 3:50 a.m. on July 14, 1937, when a gunman opened fire with a sawed-off shotgun. Dunn bled to death from his wounds within a half-hour.
