= Senator Kinney =

Senator Kinney may refer to:

- Alfred Kinney (1858/59–1934), Arizona State Senate
- Antoinette Kinney (1862–1945), Utah State Senate
- Asa Kinney (1810–1886), Wisconsin State Senate
- Coates Kinney (1826–1904), Ohio State Senate
- Henry Kinney (1814–1862), Texas State Senate
- Kevin Kinney (politician) (born 1963), Iowa State Senate
- Lisa F. Kinney (fl. 1980s–1990s), Wyoming State Senate
- Mary Strong Kinney (1859–1938), Oregon State Senate
- Michael Kinney (1875–1971), Missouri State Senate
- Ole G. Kinney (1858–1922), Wisconsin State Senate
- Thomas Kinney (1868–1912), Missouri State Senate
- William Kinney (Illinois politician) (1781–1843), Illinois State Senate
