= Egan's Rats =

American crime gang

- Founded: c. 1890
- Founded by: Thomas Kinney; Thomas Egan
- Founding location: St. Louis, Missouri, United States
- Years active: 1890–1924
- Territory: St. Louis, Missouri, United States
- Ethnicity: Irish-American, Italian-American, Jewish-American
- Membership (est.): 300–400 (est. 1912)
- Criminal activities: Rum-running, robbery, murder, extortion, union busting
- Rivals: Bottoms Gang; Hogan Gang

Egan's Rats was an American organized crime gang that exercised considerable power in St. Louis, Missouri, from 1890 to 1924. Its 35 years of criminal activity included bootlegging, labor slugging, voter intimidation, armed robbery, and murder. Although predominantly Irish-American, Egan's Rats did include a few Italian-Americans and some Jewish immigrants, most notably Max "Big Maxie" Greenberg.

The gang was formed by Thomas "Snake" Kinney and Tom Egan. It became the dominant criminal organization in St. Louis around the turn of the 20th century, when they became noted as the worst political terrorists in the city. The Rats squeezed out the required number of Democratic votes at the polls. In addition to their election tactics, the Rats also engaged in union busting, armed robbery, and theft from railroads. By the mid-1910s, the gang had entered into bootlegging. By 1921, both Tom and Willie Egan were dead and leadership of the crew passed to William "Dint" Colbeck. Egan's Rats soon went to war with the rival Hogan Gang, whom they suspected of killing Willie Egan. After defeating the Hogans in a well-publicized war, the Rats turned to armed robberies rather than bootlegging as a chief source of income. In November 1924, nine key members of the Egan gang were sentenced to long terms in federal prison for a mail robbery at Staunton, Illinois. While a few lower-ranking members of Egan's Rats still operated in St. Louis, they were finished by the fall of 1925.

Those members of the gang who escaped imprisonment spread across the country. Some of the ex-Rats, led by Fred "Killer" Burke, were suspected of being involved in the St. Valentine's Day Massacre. The gang later made headlines when gang member Leo Vincent Brothers was convicted of the murder of Chicago Tribune reporter Jake Lingle in June 1930.

== History ==
Egan's Rats was founded around 1890 by Thomas "Snake" Kinney and Thomas Egan, two street toughs living in the riverfront "Kerry Patch" neighborhood of St. Louis. Recruiting other members from the neighborhood, the Rats started out as pickpockets, burglars, and armed robbers. The gang also aided the Democratic Party political machine by intimidating voters at polling places on Election Day. Kinney used the gang as a stepping stone into politics. He first served as the Fourth Ward’s delegate in to the Missouri House of Delegates and later served in the Missouri State Senate.

In contrast, Tom Egan stayed in the old neighborhood and became the main leader of the increasingly powerful Rats. By 1904, Egan's Rats was the most powerful street gang in St. Louis. The fabric of the gang were the Democratic political clubs scattered around the city. Most members of the Rats belonged to one club or another. Some Egan-affiliated clubs were the Jolly Five, Cross Keys, and Friendly Ten.

The Egan Gang's main rival at this time was the violent Bottoms Gang from the Twenty-second Ward. However, the Bottoms Gang made the mistake of assaulting police officers and were soon forced out of existence. Ruthless killers, the Rats Gang was willing to assassinate anyone, regardless of the consequences. On June 7, 1909, the Rats murdered rival gunman Fred "Yellow Kid" Mohrle in the Four Courts Building while he was on trial for killing Egan gangster Sam Young. The Rats got a little taste of their own medicine when John "Bad Jack" Barry, leader of the Cross Keys Club, was fatally shot in a North Side courtroom on February 24, 1910 by Henry Diederichsen.

By 1912, Tom Egan headed an organization of 300 to 400 men. That same year, he gave an astounding interview to the St. Louis Post-Dispatch in which he flaunted his power and underworld status. The murder of auto mechanic Fred Hesse, in particular, underscored the Rats' blatant gangsterism. At high noon on November 7, 1913, dozens of witnesses saw Deputy Constable Harry Levin shoot and kill Hesse in front of 2647 Olive Street. Fred Hesse was suspected to have "snitched" on the Rats over a $15,000 railroad swindle. Despite the fact that numerous people saw the unprovoked murder, Levin was acquitted on April 23, 1914.

With Snake Kinney’s death from tuberculosis, Tom Egan moved the gang into more sophisticated rackets. Correctly suspecting that alcohol consumption would soon be prohibited in the United States, Tom Egan set up a liquor smuggling network in St. Louis.

By early 1916, the Egan's Rats went to war with the depleted Bottoms Gang. The main cause was disgruntled Egan gangster Harry "Cherries" Dunn, who was angry that Tom Egan did little to help his imprisoned brother John. Dunn shot and killed original Egan gang member William "Skippy" Rohan inside Tom Egan's saloon on January 8, 1916. Tom's brother Willie successfully argued to spare Dunn's life. "Cherries" defected to the Bottoms Gang and instigated a full-blown war on August 21, 1916, when he killed Harry Romani, a semi-pro boxer and crook who was allied with the Egan gang.

Willie Egan and four of his men confronted Cherries Dunn at the Typo Press Club on September 19, 1916. Walter Costello and Frank "Gutter" Newman shot and killed him. The war between the Egan and Bottoms gangs claimed almost a dozen lives, including both of Harry Dunn's murderers.

Despite the passage of a Prohibition law, Tom Egan was unable to reap the full benefits of his liquor smuggling ring. Tom died of Bright's Disease on April 20, 1919.

After Tom Egan's death in 1919, Egan's Rats was taken over by his younger brother, Willie. Unfortunately, Willie wasn’t a natural leader like his brother. As a result, younger gang members became restless. While Egan wanted to build up the bootlegging business for longterm profits, the younger members wanted the quicker payoffs of armed robberies. Rebelling against Egan, these youthful gangsters, known as “red hots”, began robbing up banks, armored cars, and messengers with lightning rapidity.

By 1921, these disputes worsened when Max "Big Maxie" Greenberg, a dissatisfied Egan's Rats member, double-crossed Willie Egan over a shipment of whiskey. In retaliation, Egan unsuccessfully attempted to kill Greenberg. At this point, Max defected to a new rival, the Hogan Gang. The Hogan Gang was headed by Egan archrival, Edward "Jelly Roll" Hogan, who also served as the Deputy Missouri State Beverage Inspector. On October 31, 1921, Willie Egan was gunned down in front of his Franklin Avenue saloon. The Hogan Gang were considered to be the likely suspects.

With the murder of Willie Egan in 1921, William "Dint" Colbeck took over Egan’s Rats. A former plumber and World War I infantryman, Colbeck aggressively led Egan's Rats against the Hogans. Shootings swept the city, with both gangsters and innocent bystanders being killed on the streets. A primary order of business was tracking down Willie Egan's alleged murderers. According to Dint Colbeck, James Hogan, John Doyle, and Luke Kennedy had been paid $10,000 each to kill Egan. Doyle was shot and killed by St. Louis police on January 6, 1922, while Luke Kennedy was trapped in Wellston on April 17, 1922. Kennedy was shot and killed while begging for his life. Jimmy Hogan spent most of the next year in hiding. In the winter of 1923, the Egan-Hogan war was re-ignited when the Rats killed Hogan lawyer Jacob Mackler on February 21, 1923. The Rats also shot up Jelly Roll Hogan's house at 3035 Cass Avenue on two occasions. By now, public outrage at reached a fever pitch and people were scrambling to figure out how to get the gangs from shooting each other. By the spring of 1923, the Rats forced the battered Hogan Gang to sign a peace treaty.

Now at peace, the Rats commenced a crime wave of robbery and murder in Missouri and Illinois. The gang was ruthless with anyone who crossed them, including their own members. In the midst of it all, Colbeck maintained the gang’s rackets. Headquartered at a St. Louis County roadhouse named the Maxwelton Club, the Rats increasingly looked toward their armed robberies for income.

=== Armed robbery ===
It was later estimated that the Rats stole nearly $4.5 million worth in cash and property in a five-year period. Some of the bank robberies attributed to Egan's Rats include:

- the Baden Bank, St. Louis, of $59,000 on April 10, 1919;
- Lowell Bank, St. Louis of $11,877 on April 9, 1920;
- Hodiamont Bank, Wellston, Missouri, of $7,189 on October 24, 1921;
- State Bank of Dupo, Dupo, Illinois, of $10,000 on December 23, 1921;
- Gravois Bank, Affton, Missouri of $3,500 on March 6, 1922;
- Wellston Trust Company, Wellston, Missouri, of $22,000 on March 16, 1923;
- Park Savings Trust Company, St. Louis, of $2,380 on November 6, 1923;
- West St. Louis Trust Company, St. Louis, of $26,850 on January 15, 1924;
- Bank of Maplewood, Maplewood, Missouri of $8,500 on February 26, 1924;
- Granite City National Bank, Granite City, Illinois of $63,000 on April 25, 1924; and
- the Wellston Trust Company (again), Wellston, Missouri, of $40,000 on September 19, 1924.

These bank robberies represent only a fraction of the heists Egan's Rats pulled off in the 1919-1924 window allotted by informant Ray Renard. By far, their most famous caper took place in downtown St. Louis on the morning of April 2, 1923, when they stuck up an armored mail truck after receiving a tip from the Cuckoo Gang. The Rats took control of the truck and made off with $2.4 million in cash and negotiable bonds.

=== Gang breakup ===
In 1924, Egan's Rats would suffer a crushing blow. Fearing for his life, imprisoned gang member Ray Renard started cooperating with federal prosecutors. On November 15, 1924, Colbeck, Louis "Red" Smith, Steve Ryan, David "Chippy" Robinson, Oliver Dougherty, Frank Hackethal, Charles "Red" Lanham, Gus Dietmeyer, and Frank "Cotton" Epplesheimer, were convicted of a Staunton, Illinois, mail robbery and sentenced to 25 years' imprisonment.

With the convictions of Colbeck and his associates, Egan's Rats fell apart. The gang members who hadn't gone to prison scattered across the country, wreaking havoc wherever they went. One crew of ex-Rats, led by Fred "Killer" Burke, committed numerous robberies, kidnappings, and contract murders throughout the American Midwest. This crew allegedly took part in the infamous 1929 St. Valentine’s Day Massacre of seven gangsters in Chicago. Burke was involved in the killings of policemen in 1928 and 1929 and died in prison in 1940. Another ex-Rat, Leo Vincent Brothers, was convicted of killing Chicago Tribune reporter Jake Lingle in 1930. Two other former members, Pete and Thomas "Yonnie" Licavoli, started the “River Gang”, a large Detroit bootlegging gang that would dominate rackets in both Detroit and Toledo, Ohio. A former Rat named Elmer Macklin would murder Detroit mob boss Chester LaMare in February 1931. Another, Raymond "Craneneck" Nugent, was involved in the killing of an Ohio policeman in 1928 and "vanished" in April 1931.

By the early 1940s, Colbeck and most of the imprisoned gang members had been set free. They returned to a St. Louis that had changed over the past 20 years. Colbeck and some other gang members tried to muscle their way back into power. Most of them went to work for local mob boss Frank “Buster” Wortman and eventually retired peacefully. However, Colbeck was machine-gunned to death while driving down a St. Louis street on February 17, 1943.

== See also ==
- List of fugitives from justice who disappeared
- Morris Rudensky
