= Raymond Howard =

Raymond Howard may refer to:

- Raymond Howard (Wiccan) (fl. 1959–1967), English Wiccan
- Raymond Howard (Missouri politician), American politician active in Missouri
- Raymond Howard (New Hampshire politician), member of the New Hampshire House of Representatives in 2014
- Raymond Howard, American who disappeared with his wife, see "The Way" (Fastball song)

== See also ==
- Ray Howard (1891–1957), American racing driver
