= Max Greenberg =

American organized crime figure

- Born: 1883; Detroit, Michigan, United States
- Died: April 12, 1933 (aged 50); Elizabeth, New Jersey, United States
- Cause of death: Murdered
- Other names: Big Maxie Greenberg; Big Head Greenberg
- Occupation: Bootlegger
- Known for: Detroit and St. Louis organized crime figure during Prohibition; involved in bootlegging with Arnold Rothstein, Waxey Gordon, Max Hassel

Max "Big Maxie" Greenberg (1883–1933) was an American bootlegger and organized crime figure in Detroit, Michigan, and later a member of Egan's Rats in St. Louis. He oversaw the purchasing of sacramental wine from Orthodox rabbis, then allowed under the Volstead Act, which were sold to bootleggers in the St. Louis–Kansas City, Missouri area during Prohibition. He was also associated with mobsters in this particular method of acquiring illegal liquor including Waxey Gordon, Meyer Lansky and Arnold Rothstein.

By the early 1910s, Greenberg had joined the Egan's Rats and become one of their best members. Max, his brother Morris, and two others were suspected in the murder of Sam Mintz on December 5, 1914. It was disclosed that Mintz had informed on the gang in a fire insurance scam they were running; Greenberg managed to avoid being caught. Greenberg was also believed to have played a key role in the Rats' first known bank robbery, that of the Baden Bank on April 10, 1919, during which the robbers took $59,000.

Soon after the Baden bank heist, Greenberg, Ben Milner, and Edward "Big Red" Powers were sentenced to Leavenworth Federal Penitentiary on an interstate theft charge, stemming from the Egan-sponsored robbery of some railroad cars in Danville, Illinois. Egan gang boss William Egan and Missouri State Senator Michael Kinney managed to finagle the three men pardons from none other than President Woodrow Wilson himself.

Soon after their release, Greenberg and Milner decided to go into the bootlegging racket for themselves. They accomplished this by betraying the very same man who had saved them from prison: Willie Egan. Egan gave Greenberg $2,000 to make a deal with a Mexican smuggler for a load of whiskey. Greenberg, it later turned out, paid the smuggler but kept the whiskey for himself. Egan was furious and demanded that Greenberg reimburse him, but Greenberg claimed the whiskey barge had sunk in the Mississippi River. These bad feelings came to a head in the early morning hours of October 16, 1920, when Greenberg and his friends engaged the rest of the Egan's Rats in a huge brawl at Egan's Franklin Avenue saloon. One of the men severely injured was attorney John Sweeney. A month later, Milner would be shot and killed during a running gun battle with the Russo Gang. After these two incidents his bootleg business fell into disarray, forcing Greenberg to leave St. Louis for Detroit.

In the fall of 1920, he was introduced to Rothstein by Waxey Gordon and asked for a $175,000 loan to purchase speedboats to bring in alcohol from Ontario to Detroit as well as additional funds for graft payoffs. Rothstein liked the idea, but instead decided to take up rum-running to New York where the demand was the highest in the country. Gordon was allowed to run the operation as a junior partner while Greenberg, in order not to be cut out entirely, was allowed to take part in the deal under the condition that he mortgage all his personal property to Rothstein and take out an expensive life insurance policy with Rothstein's insurance company.

In March 1921, Greenberg returned to St. Louis to lay the groundwork for his new business. Willie Egan gave Greenberg one last chance to account for the missing whiskey. The two, along with John Sweeney and an unidentified man, met at the corner of Sixth and Chestnut streets in downtown St. Louis on March 11, 1921. Greenberg refused to pay once again. As the meet broke up, a lone gunman appeared out of the shadows and started shooting. Sweeney was killed and Greenberg was shot through the jaw. Despite the severity of his wounds, Greenberg survived. In the wake of this attempt on his life, Greenberg formed an alliance with the rival Hogan Gang.

The Egan's Rats steadfastly believed that Greenberg was the driving force behind the murder of Egan, who was gunned down in front of his saloon on October 31, 1921. It was said that Greenberg paid the three shooters $10,000 each for the hit. During the ensuing gang war, new Egan boss Dint Colbeck made hunting Greenberg a top priority. After Monsignor Timothy Dempsey negotiated a truce between the Egan and Hogan gangs in June 1922, several armed Hogan gangsters escorted Max Greenberg onto a New York-bound train.

Returning to New York City, Greenburg and Gordon then began leasing motorboats and trucks which brought in bonded whiskey and scotch from Rothstein's contacts in Canada and the United Kingdom. Their rum-running system, protected by Rothstein's payoffs to certain members of the U.S. Coast Guard as well as police and local politicians in Long Island and the Jersey Shore, delivered alcohol to high-class hotels in Manhattan among Rothstein's clientele. The bootlegging operation became one of the biggest and most successful in the country for five years until September 1925 when Prohibition agents seized one of their ships off Astoria, Long Island. On September 23, Greenberg and Gordon were arrested with 11 others and charged with conspiracy to violate the National Prohibition Act.

He later went to New Jersey where, in July 1929, he formed a bootlegging cartel with Waxey Gordon and Max Hassel. Greenberg managed Gordon's vast real estate, hotel and gambling interests while Gordon's muscle and Hassel's political connections made a formidable alliance whose operation eventually became the largest producer of real beer in the New York–Philadelphia area. By 1933, the three owned at least 16 or 17 breweries stretching from Buffalo, Elmira and Syracuse, New York to eastern Pennsylvania, New Jersey, Delaware and Maryland, according to the US government. They also controlled smaller unlicensed breweries known as "cold water" or "wild cats".

Greenberg and his partners began to come under pressure to join the Italian–Jewish criminal syndicate controlled by Lucky Luciano and Meyer Lansky. They also began receiving threats from rival Dutch Schultz. On the afternoon of April 12, 1933, Greenberg and Gordon were scheduled to meet with Hassel at his suite on the eighth floor of the Carteret Hotel in Elizabeth, New Jersey. Between 2:30 and 4:00 pm, taxi driver George Hickman told police he drove Greenberg and two other unidentified men from the hotel to the Harrison brewery. He then drove them back to the Carteret where he saw Greenberg entered the building. The two men who were with him stayed outside for a few moments before following him inside. Although these men remained unidentified, it was suggested they may have been Greenberg's bodyguards who were making sure no one followed their boss up to Hassel's hotel room. This was supported by the hotel barber who said Greenberg waved to him as he entered the hotel at 4:10 pm. A second theory developed by police suggested that Greenberg never left the hotel at all as hotel employees claimed his bulletproof sedan was not taken out of the hotel garage that day. Investigators found it unlikely that Greenberg would risk taking a taxi, and without his regular bodyguard, knowing that his life may have been in danger.

Shortly after the meeting started, Gordon left his partners and walked down the hall where he claimed to have entered the room of a young lady, 22-year-old mob prostitute Nancy Presser, with whom he spent the rest of the afternoon. He admitted he had talked to some men after leaving the meeting, but police did not release their names. Lou Parkowitz was also present the room and left when the participants began discussing serious matters. He was the last to see Greenberg and Hassel alive as, several minutes later, he returned to the room after hearing gunfire and found both men had been shot to death. Parkowitz claimed that he had passed several men running past him as he hurried back to the room. Entering the room, Parkowitz discovered Hassel's body laying face down near the office doorway while Greenberg was slumped over a closed rolltop desk shot five times in the chest and head.

Frankie Carbo, a gunman for Murder, Inc., was later charged with the murders of Greenberg and Hassel following his arrest in 1935. He spent six months in jail before the case was dropped. Joseph Stassi claimed that Meyer Lansky, Abner "Abe" Zwillman and Joe Adonis had ordered the three men killed in order to consolidate their control over bootlegging operations in North Jersey.
