= William Rohan =

William Rohan may refer to:

- William M. Rohan, member of the Wisconsin State Assembly
- William "Skippy" Rohan, St. Louis gangster
