= Harry Dunn (gangster) =

American gangster (1892–1916)

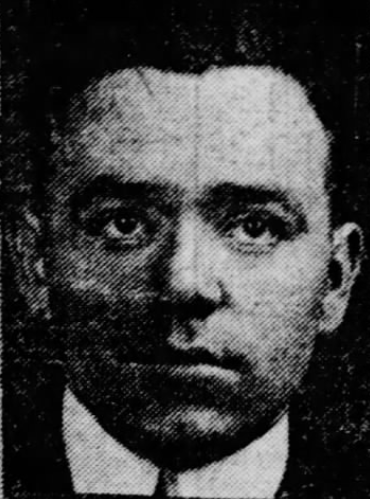
- Born: October 28, 1892; St. Louis, Missouri, United States
- Died: September 19, 1916 (aged 23); St. Louis, Missouri, United States
- Cause of death: Gunshot
- Other name: Cherries
- Occupation: Gangster

Harry "Cherries" Dunn (October 28, 1892 – September 19, 1916) was a St. Louis gangster and member of the Egan's Rats.

== Biography ==
Born and raised in North St. Louis to Irish-American parents, Harry and his brother John, known as "Pudgy", joined the Egan's Rats in their teens. Harry, nicknamed "Cherries", was known as a ladies man and a daring crook. A first-class street fighter, Harry was quick on the trigger of a pistol and known for his hair-trigger temper. Locked up in the City Workhouse in the spring of 1913, Harry staged a daring escape and resumed his place in the Egan mob.

While in Chicago with his brother John on November 5, 1914, the two Dunn brothers shot and killed a gangster named Robert Koch. Both men were convinced that Koch had been sent up from St. Louis to specifically kill them. While Harry got off scot free, Pudgy was convicted and sentenced to an Illinois prison.

Frustrated that Egan gang boss Tom Egan hadn't done anything to help his imprisoned brother, Harry went to the St. Louis police headquarters in December 1915 and offered to snitch on his gangmates in order to free Pudgy from prison. The cops turned down Harry's proposal. As he left the police station, Dunn ran into William "Skippy" Rohan, one of the original members of the Egan's Rats. Worried that Rohan would rat him out, Cherries Dunn became increasingly paranoid.

On December 21, 1915, Cherries Dunn got into a beef with a group of laborers in a saloon at Goodfellow and Cote Brilliante avenues and ended up fatally shooting John Groenwald over trivial reasons. Nine days later, Dunn and two pals botched a holdup and killed a North St. Louis saloonkeeper named Charles Reutilinger.

With a police dragnet out for him, Harry Dunn strode into Tom Egan's saloon at Broadway and Carr streets at 12:30 on the morning of January 8, 1916. Inside he saw Skippy Rohan. Cherries ordered drinks for everyone except Rohan. Skippy asked, "What's the matter with me?" Dunn replied, "Go on, you snitch!" Before Skippy could answer, Harry shot him dead. Dunn had violated a cardinal rule of the Egan's Rats, by killing someone on the premises of Tom Egan's saloon.

Because Willie Egan was a good friend of Dunn's, the gangster's life was spared. Cherries Dunn signed on with the old Bottoms Gang, and continued to rob and kill with no abandon. His main hangout was the Typo Press Club, a saloon located at the rear of 712 Pine Street.

The final straw occurred on August 21, 1916, when Cherries Dunn and his pal, Eddie Schoenborn, shot and killed a semi-pro boxer named Harry Romani who was hooked up with the Egan mob. The task of getting rid of Dunn thus fell to his friend Willie Egan.

Egan and four of his men confronted Harry "Cherries" Dunn inside the Typo Press Club at 3 a.m. on September 19, 1916. During their conversation at the bar, two of Egan's men, Walter Costello and Frank "Gutter" Newman, shot and killed Dunn without warning.

Harry Dunn's murder touched off a gang war between the Egan's Rats and the Bottoms Gang which claimed around a dozen lives. After his release from prison, John "Pudgy" Dunn swore to avenge his brother's murder by killing everyone connected to his death.
