= Frank Hackethal =

Frank T. Hackethal (December 13, 1891 – July 13, 1954) was a prominent St. Louis organized crime figure in the early 20th century. He was one of nine members of the Egan's Rats to be convicted of mail robbery on November 15, 1924.

Hackethal was born in Denver, Colorado. By 1893 his parents had returned to the Chouteau Township area of Madison County, Illinois. Frank served with the American forces during World War I. By 1921 he had turned to a life of crime.

A high-ranking member of the Egan gang, Hackethal owned a popular resort on Long Lake, about thirty miles from Staunton, Illinois. This resort was a favorite hangout of the Rats, who used it as a base of operations while they were planning a mail robbery in Staunton.

Hackethal's resort was also the scene of a violent inter-gang dispute on May 24, 1923, when David "Chippy" Robinson, James "Sticky" Hennessey, and Joe Powderly showed up to do some drinking. The former two had lured Powderly to the joint for the express purpose of killing him. When this was accomplished, the two Egans dragged his body out of the joint and put it in their car. While Hennessey propped up Powderly's dead body, Chippy Robinson stuck a cigar in the corpse's mouth and cracked jokes about the man he just killed. The Weekend at Bernie's-style antics continued until they reached the Mississippi River, where they disposed of the body. Two days later, the Rats committed their Staunton mail robbery, netting $45,000.

Hackethal, along with eight other Rats, was convicted for taking part in the Staunton mail robbery in November 1924. He drew a 25-year sentence at Leavenworth Federal Penitentiary. Within two years, Hackethal and several others were transferred to the Atlanta Federal Penitentiary. Hackethal finished his sentence in Springfield, Illinois, and was released in January 1941.

Hackethal died at home in Granite City on July 13, 1954. He was survived by six of his eight siblings.
