= William Kinney =

William Kinney may refer to:

- William Kinney (Illinois politician) (1781–1843), American pioneer, politician and lieutenant governor of Illinois
- William Ansel Kinney (1860–1930), lawyer and politician in Hawaii
- William Burnet Kinney (1799–1880), American politician and diplomat
- William J. Kinney, alderman and federal liquor inspector
