= David "Chippy" Robinson =

David "Chippy" Robinson (1897–1967) was a St. Louis armed robber and contract killer responsible for many crimes during the Prohibition era. He was a top ranking member of the Egan's Rats gang.

Born David Michael Robison in the North Side neighborhood of Baden, Robinson joined the Rats as a young man in the mid-1910s. Along with Tony Ortell, Chippy was caught burglarizing a North Side gas station on August 18, 1918 when Charles Hoffman surprised them. Hoffman was shot and killed but not before he wounded Robinson.

By the beginning of Prohibition, Robinson had become good friends with William "Dint" Colbeck, right-hand man of boss Willie Egan. Standing of medium height, with blonde hair and blue eyes, Chippy Robinson became noted as the gang's best marksman. Target practice occupied most of his idle time. Robinson also possessed a near legendary temper, often fueled by alcohol. Chippy would frequently, for sport, empty his gun at the feet of a lesser member of the gang in order to watch him "dance."

With Willie Egan's murder, the Egan's Rats went to war with the rival Hogan Gang. Chippy Robinson was suspected of participating in most, if not all, of the major strikes against the Hogans. Robinson also joined his comrades on heists, whether they were bank robberies, messenger holdups, or jewelry store burglaries. On two occasions, Chippy and his pals held up the Jack Daniel's warehouse, removing large quantities of whiskey and selling it for a profit.

While Chippy could be personable and friendly, when drunk even his closest associates often edged for the door. Robinson and James "Sticky" Hennessey lured low-level Rat Joe Powderly to a Staunton, Illinois resort on the night of May 26, 1923. After drinking off a few rounds, Chippy told Powderly flatly that he intended to kill him. Joe tried to flee only to be shot down before he moved a step. On the long drive back to the city, Chippy propped up Joe Powderly's dead body, stuck a cigar in his mouth, and cracked jokes to him as if he were still alive.

On another occasion later in 1923, Chippy went out drinking with independent safecracker Billy Grant, his wife Rosie, and Wilfred Stainaker. A heavily intoxicated Robinson took offense to a remark from Grant. After robbing the trio, Chippy whipped out two pistols and shot all three of them, in front of a nightclub full of people. One witness claimed he laughed hysterically as he pumped bullets into their bodies.

On November 15, 1924, David "Chippy" Robinson was convicted along with eight pals of mail robbery and sentenced to 25 years in prison. By 1926, he had been transferred to the Atlanta Federal Penitentiary. Not long after his arrival, Chippy got word that a Jack Barrett was paying undue "attention" to his wife Mabel. Robinson reached out from behind bars to remove Barrett from the scene, as he was found shot to death on November 22, 1926.

Paroled in February, 1941, the now middle-aged Chippy Robinson returned to St. Louis. He and his old Egan gang pals were rumored to be trying to resume their old criminal fiefdom. These rumors were confirmed somewhat when Dint Colbeck was machine-gunned to death on February 17, 1943. Robinson was questioned in the murder of his friend, but he was never charged. It soon became that Chippy and the ex-Rats had signed on with East St. Louis gangster Frank "Buster" Wortman. Robinson and Steve Ryan were suspected of abducting and killing gangster Patrick Hogan in September 1944. Two years later, both would be charged with extortion. Both men beat the rap. David "Chippy" Robinson appears to have worked for the St. Louis mob for a number of years before he retired peacefully.
