= Leo Vincent Brothers =

American gangster most active in Chicago, Illinois (1899–1950)

- Brothers, circa 1931
- Born: 1899; United States
- Died: December 23, 1950 (aged 50–51); St. Louis, Missouri, United States
- Other name: Vincent Bader
- Occupation: Gangster

Leo Vincent Brothers, also known as Vincent Bader (1899 – December 23, 1950) was an early 20th-century American gangster who gained notoriety throughout the underworld after being convicted of the 1930 murder of Chicago Tribune reporter Jake Lingle.

Starting out as a low-level member of the St. Louis gang known as the Egan's Rats, Brothers was once the manager and a bouncer at The Green Mill in Chicago. Brothers soon graduated into labor racketeering and contract murder. Dodging a 1929 murder indictment, Brothers fled to Chicago, where he found work in the Chicago Outfit under the notorious crime boss, Al Capone. Leo was ultimately convicted of the Lingle murder and sentenced to 14 years. His attorney was Louis Piquett, who later became famous as John Dillinger's lawyer.

Most observers, then and now, believe that Brothers was handed up to the state by Capone as a sacrifice. Mario Gomes, Capone historian says that Frank (Frankie) Foster who was a triggerman for the North Side Mob and later the Chicago Outfit was most likely the man who pulled the trigger on the Jake Lingle contract. The contract was handed out and organized by Jack Zuta. After his release in 1940, Brothers returned to St. Louis, beat his original murder case, and became hooked up with the local mob. Three months after an unsuccessful attempt on his life, Leo Brothers died of heart disease in St. Louis on December 23, 1950.
