= William Colbeck (gangster) =

American politician and gangster

- Born: November 17, 1890; St. Louis, Missouri, United States
- Died: February 17, 1943 (aged 52); St. Louis, Missouri, United States
- Cause of death: Gunshot wounds
- Burial place: Calvary Cemetery
- Occupations: Politician, criminal

William P. "Dinty" Colbeck (November 17, 1890 – February 17, 1943) was a St. Louis politician and organized crime figure involved in bootlegging and illegal gambling. He succeeded William Egan as head of the Egan's Rats bootlegging gang in the early 1920s.

== Early years ==
Born in North St. Louis with German and Irish roots, Colbeck joined Egan's Rats in his late teens. In between his gangster jobs, Colbeck trained to work as a plumber. His work in this field resulted in his nickname of "Dinty" or "Dint", as he was most usually called by associates. After the outbreak of World War I, Colbeck joined the U.S. Army in April 1918 and fought as an infantryman with the 89th Infantry Division in France. Upon his return home in 1919, Colbeck became Willie Egan's right-hand man in the gang.

== Gang leader ==
On October 31, 1921, Willie Egan was shot dead in front of his Franklin Avenue saloon by gunmen in a passing automobile. Colbeck had been present at the time of the shooting and Egan reportedly whispered to him the names of the shooters before he died. Now the leader of the gang, Dinty announced to his men that Egan's killers were Jimmy Hogan, John Doyle, and Luke Kennedy. These three belonged to the Rats' arch-rivals, the Hogan Gang, which was led by Edward "Jelly Roll" Hogan, the Missouri state beverage inspector. Colbeck and his men immediately retaliated and gang warfare engulfed St. Louis.

During the first years of Prohibition, the Rats controlled most of the illegal bootlegging in and around St. Louis. They also began to supplement their bootlegging profits with armed robberies that victimized banks, armored cars, and messengers. It was estimated that Egan's Rats stole nearly $4,000,000 over a five-year period. Colbeck was ruthless with anyone who got in the gang's way, including its own members.

Dinty Colbeck was the most powerful gangster in St. Louis during the early 1920s. He and his men were headquartered at the Maxwelton Club in North St. Louis County, and Colbeck often dispensed bribes, illegal booze, or other favors from his roost. Dinty also served as the sergeant-at-arms of the St. Louis Democratic City Committee, giving him a political base inside the city government. While Colbeck was shot and wounded by the Hogan Gang during the gang war, he successfully led his crew against their rivals until a peace treaty was brokered in June 1922 by Monsignor Timothy Dempsey. While Dinty did not usually accompany his men on jobs, he had no qualms about getting his hands dirty. Having survived years on the streets and combat on the Western Front, Colbeck was fearless under fire and an expert shot; his weapon of choice was the BAR.

The Egan-Hogan gang war re-ignited when Colbeck and five of his men assassinated Hogan Gang lawyer Jacob Mackler on February 21, 1923. Shootings again rocked the city of St. Louis. By Easter Sunday 1923, both Dint and Jelly Roll Hogan wrote letters to the citizens of St. Louis telling them that the war was finally finished once and for all; both notes were published in the St. Louis Star.

== Downfall ==
By 1924, Colbeck and the Rats were at the height of their power, but trouble was coming fast. Cliques had developed in the gang, and Colbeck surrounded himself with his four core gunmen: bodyguard Louis "Red" Smith, Steve Ryan, Oliver Daugherty, and sharpshooter David "Chippy" Robinson. A handful of Rats either fled town or ran afoul of Dinty Colbeck. In one instance of intra-gang turmoil, Dinty and his four top men executed disgruntled Egan gang member Eddie Linehan at the Maxwelton Club on February 13, 1924.

By this time, the law was closing in as well. Colbeck and his top henchmen went on trial for two 1923 mail robberies, one of which netted the gang nearly $2.4 million US in cash and negotiable bonds. In order to pay his crew's mounting legal fees, Dinty led some of the boys on the robbery of the Granite City National Bank on April 25, 1924, netting $63,000. Colbeck was also suspected of ordering an assassination attempt on his longtime benefactor and associate, Missouri State Senator Michael Kinney, on June 3, 1924. Kinney survived his wounds, and no one was charged in his shooting.

On the strength of the testimony of Egan gangster Ray Renard, Colbeck and eight of his men were convicted on November 15, 1924, and sentenced to 25 years in federal prison. While in the Atlanta Federal Penitentiary, one of his cell mates was Chicago gang boss Al Capone, who assisted him in his work with the Catholic chaplain. Legend has it the two hit it off so well they planned to go into business together once they were both paroled. These plans were foiled by Capone's transfer to Alcatraz in 1934.

== Unsuccessful comeback ==
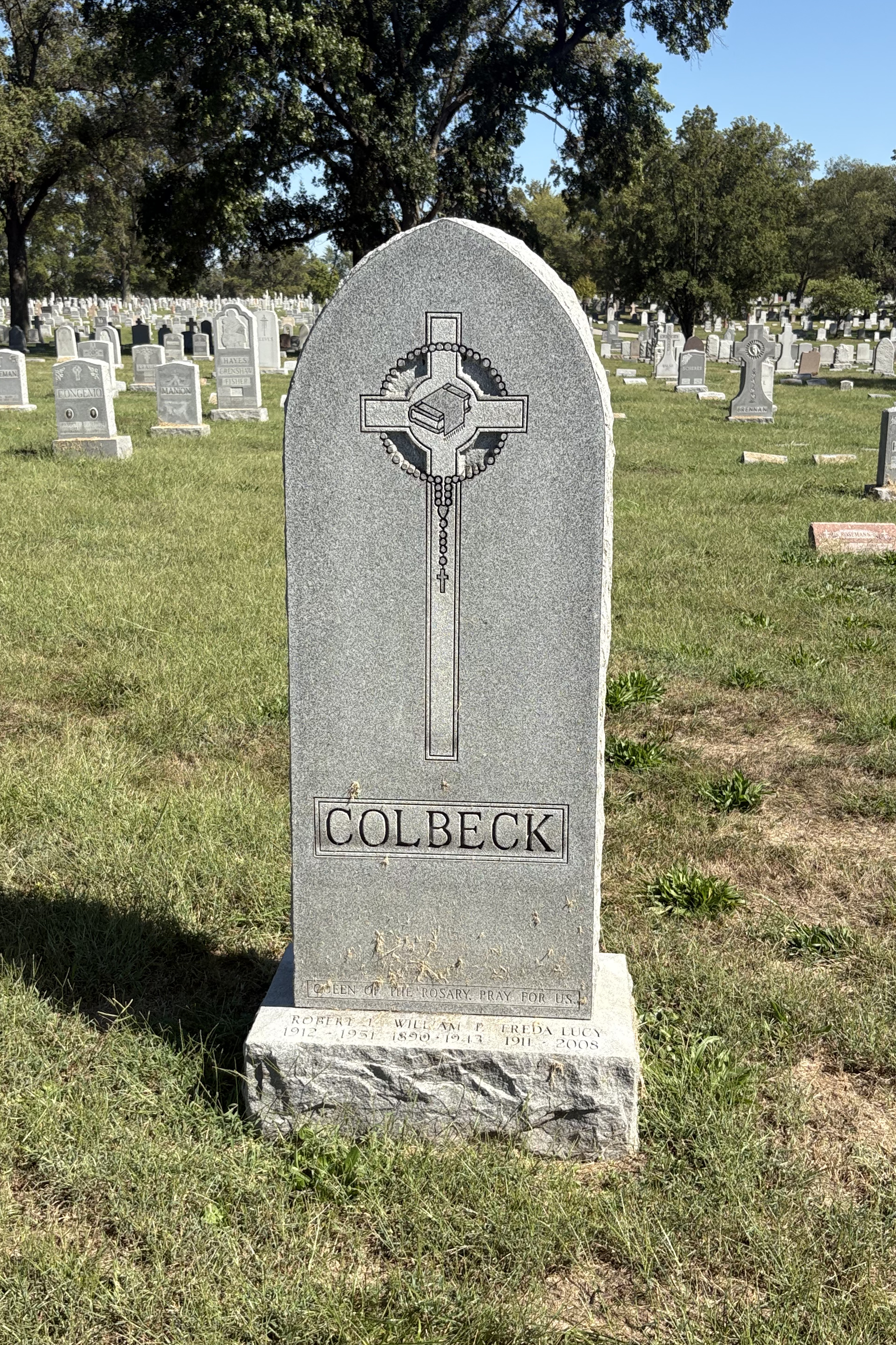
Colbeck's grave at Calvary Cemetery

Paroled in November 1940, Colbeck declared he was going to work as a master plumber and stay out of trouble. Nevertheless, Colbeck and his old associates were rumored to be trying to muscle their way back into the St. Louis underworld. On February 17, 1943, Dinty Colbeck was found machine-gunned to death in his car at the corner of Ninth and Destrehan streets in St. Louis. The exact motive for his murder was unclear; he might have been killed by crime bosses wanting to eliminate a potential rival or by someone nursing a grudge. No one was ever charged in Colbeck's murder.

He was buried at Calvary Cemetery in St. Louis.

== See also ==
- List of unsolved murders (1900–1979)
