= William J. Kinney =

American politician

William J. Kinney was a former alderman and federal liquor inspector. He was the brother of Missouri state senators Thomas Kinney and Michael Kinney. His duty station was the Jack Daniel's building in St. Louis (liquor warehoused there during Prohibition could only be used for prescribed medicinal purposes). He was an ally of the Egan's Rats, a group of notorious local gangsters. In August 1923, crooks methodically siphoned bourbon through 150 feet of hose to trucks, draining 893 barrels. In May 1924, Kinney and others were indicted for the scheme. Kinney and 22 others were convicted in 1925 in Indianapolis, a change-of-venue location.

After Prohibition ended, Jack Daniels moved back to Lynchburg, Tennessee. The building on Duncan Street was torn down in 2005.
