= William "Skippy" Rohan =

American gangster (1871–1916)

- Born: July 5, 1871; St. Louis, Missouri, U.S.
- Died: January 8, 1916 (aged 44); St. Louis, Missouri, U.S.
- Other name: Skippy
- Occupation: Gangster

William "Skippy" Rohan (July 5, 1871 - January 8, 1916) was a St. Louis gangster and an original member of Egan's Rats.

Born as William J. Ruane, Rohan grew up in North St. Louis's "Kerry Patch" neighborhood. As a young man, he found his way into many of the street gangs inhabiting his district. "Skippy" was known as a tough street fighter with nerves of steel. He didn't hesitate to attack police officers who attempted to stop him from committing crimes. Despite having a prominent chipped front tooth, Rohan was considered a ladies' man. People often commented on his half-lidded eyelids, which gave him a perpetually sleepy expression. No matter how many times he was arrested and thrown in the City Workhouse, Skippy Rohan was known as the wildest crook in the Kerry Patch. In 1892, two St. Louis detectives caught Rohan in a "stick-up". Skippy drew his revolver and shot one before he could react. The other detective was pistol-whipped so hard his skull was fractured. Rohan was only caught when a uniformed patrolman happened upon the scene and shot Skippy in the leg.

By 1896, Skippy Rohan was associated with the Ashley Street Gang (the embryonic Egan's Rats). Most of the Ashley Street boys were just sneak thieves at this time and were awed to be hooked up with a notorious crook like Skippy Rohan, who took a primary position in the fledgling gang. He grew especially close to gangster Tom Egan. On June 16, 1897, Skippy Rohan was accused of shooting and killing a saloonkeeper named Casper Biemfohr during a robbery gone bad. Skippy and his pals had been on a crime spree that week, and the police set out to find the young thug. Skippy took refuge in "The Rookery", a large tenement at Fifteenth and O'Fallon streets that was crowded with refugees, criminals, and garbage. The cops finally surprised him in the alley behind 1218 Fifteenth Street. Skippy fought for his life, gouging, swinging, and biting. Even his girlfriend, Alice Parsons, tried to fight the police. Skippy was finally pistol-whipped unconscious and hauled off to jail.

Skippy's sister Catherine was married to a low-level member of the Ashley Street Gang named Carl Lohrman, who idolized his wild brother-in-law. While Skippy was locked up in the city jail, he was convinced that Lohrman was responsible for his arrest. On August 9, 1897, Carl Lohrman was lured to a meeting at Snake Kinney's saloon at Second and Carr with Tom Egan and John "Guinea Mack" McAuiliffe. As he left, Lohrman was stabbed to death at the corner of Sixth and Carr.

Despite the murder of the suspected snitch, Skippy Rohan made plans to avoid the hangman's noose on his own. On August 30, 1897, Rohan escaped from the St. Louis Workhouse along with Buck O'Malley and "Sport" Heffernan. Rohan would later claim he bribed a jailer to gain access to materials that led to his break. After robbing a local saloon for funds, he and his fellow escapees fled to Chicago, where they were re-captured four months later. Skippy Rohan was ultimately acquitted of the murder of Casper Beimfohr on May 22, 1898. While he was sent to prison on unrelated robbery charges, Rohan declared that he had found the Lord and reformed.

Over the next decade, Skippy Rohan would be in and out of prisons across the United States. He is known to have served time in New York's Sing Sing Prison. By 1914, Rohan had returned to his home town of St. Louis a broken down old thief. Years of hard living and prison time had taken their toll and Skippy Rohan truly aspired to go straight. Rohan married and obtained a job as a shoeworker. While he was away, his old gang, the Egan's Rats, had mushroomed into the most powerful criminal organization in the state of Missouri. His old pal, Tom Egan, was now looked upon as the crime boss of St. Louis. While Skippy frequently joined Egan for drinks at his saloon at Broadway and Carr streets, Rohan appears to have been serious about going legit. Skippy's life, however, would be changed by a chance encounter.

As a condition of his parole, Skippy Rohan would check in with St. Louis detectives at their headquarters at the corner of Twelfth and Clark streets. As he left one of these sessions in December 1915, Rohan ran into Egan gangster Harry "Cherries" Dunn, who mumbled a greeting and hurried away. It turned out that Dunn had visited the cops in order to offer to snitch on his fellow gang-mates in order to get his brother John sprung from an Illinois prison. As a result of this chance encounter, Cherries Dunn became paranoid that Tom Egan would find out about his disloyalty and kill him. As a result, Dunn was involved in at least two murders that month. It was later determined that his high-strung mental state resulted in him panicking and shooting in both cases. Skippy Rohan, now trying to live a normal life, was unfortunately oblivious to all this.

On the evening of January 7, 1916, Skippy Rohan and his friend August Hartmann attended a meeting for the shoemaker's union they belonged to. Afterwards, Rohan suggested they go have a few drinks in the old neighborhood. At 12:30 that morning, the two were in Tom Egan's saloon at Broadway and Carr. Even though it was a Friday night, the saloon was nearly empty. Egan's joint was a well-known gangster roost. The pair stood at the bar talking with bartender John Laker when Cherries Dunn suddenly barged in. Dunn told Laker to set the house up with drinks ... except for Rohan. Skippy growled, "What's the matter with me?" To which Dunn sneered, "Go on, you snitch!". Rohan stepped away from the bar, but before he could speak Dunn shot him squarely on the nose. Another bullet struck Rohan in the heart before he collapsed to the floor.

While police suspected that Cherries Dunn had killed Skippy Rohan, they didn't charge him. It was later surmised that Dunn killed Rohan to keep him from revealing that he had been seen at the St. Louis police headquarters. Either way, Dunn was finished in the Egan's Rats to begin with. It was a long-standing edict that no crimes were to be committed on the premises of Tom Egan's saloon. After killing a man (and longtime friend of the boss), Dunn was marked for death. Willie Egan managed to save Dunn's life for the time being, until two of his men shot Cherries to death in a Pine Street lid club nine months later.
