= Hogan Gang =

Defunct St. Louis-area prohibition gang

- Founded: c.1917
- Founded by: Edward "Jelly Roll" Hogan
- Founding location: St. Louis, Missouri, United States
- Years active: 1920s-1930s
- Territory: St. Louis, Missouri
- Ethnicity: Irish-American
- Membership (est.): 100–150 (est. 1923)
- Criminal activities: Organized crime
- Allies: Cuckoo Gang; Russo Gang
- Rivals: Egan's Rats

The Hogan Gang was a St. Louis–based criminal organization that sold illegal liquor during Prohibition in addition to committing labor slugging, voter intimidation, armed robbery, and murder. Although predominantly Irish-American, the Hogan Gang included several Italian and Jewish mobsters amongst their ranks; most notably, Max "Big Maxie" Greenberg. They fought a notoriously violent gang war with Egan's Rats in the early 1920s.

== History ==
=== Origins ===
The Hogan Gang got their name from their leader, Edward J. Hogan, Jr. The son of a St. Louis police captain, Hogan was a local saloon keeper who had gone into state politics in the 1910s. Known by the unwanted nickname of "Jelly Roll" due to his hefty build, Hogan served in the Missouri State Legislature, where he was known as an effective, garrulous lawmaker. Jelly Roll Hogan was also known to be temperamental (he and a companion assaulted a politician named Ben Neale on the steps of the Missouri Capitol Building.)

With the advent of Prohibition, Hogan and a group of hoodlums that worked under him began selling illegal beer and liquor on a large scale. Jelly Roll was also dubbed a deputy inspector for the State Beverage Department of Missouri, which gave the new gang boss a new position of influence in state and local government. Headquartered out of Hogan's saloon at Cass and Jefferson avenues, the Hogan Gang was primarily Irish-American, but had a broad range of ethnicity. Key members included James Hogan (Jelly Roll's younger brother), Humbert Costello, Charles Mercurio, Leo Casey, Abe Goldfeder, John "Kink" Connell, and Patrick Scanlon. The gang's top marksman was a dangerous shooter named Luke Kennedy.

=== Armed robberies ===
In addition to bootlegging, some members of the gang occasionally robbed banks and/or the messengers. Members of the Hogan Gang were linked a mail robbery in St. Charles, Missouri, on February 4, 1921, that netted $26,100 in Liberty bonds and another mail heist in Jefferson City on March 1, 1921, that got $34,400. The fallout from these robberies led to a series of murders that spring; most of which were allegedly perpetrated by Tommy Hayes, who would later make his name as an ace hit man for the Cuckoo Gang.

James Hogan led some of his pals on a disastrous St. Louis mail robbery on April 4, 1921, which featured a harried getaway and the discovery that they had stolen eight pounds of registered mail. A bank messenger named Erris Pillow identified Hogan as one of the men who robbed him. Despite several bribe attempts (including one made by Jelly Roll Hogan himself), Pillow was dead set on testifying. As a result, he was shot to death outside his home on May 9, 1921. Hogan gangsters Leo Casey and Dewey McAuliffe were tried and acquitted of the shooting.

=== Enemies and friends ===
Unlike their Irish-American gang counterparts in other Prohibition-era cities, the Hogan Gang got along relatively well with the local Mafia factions; they had a close business partnership with the Russo Gang. The Hogans' chief rivals were a fellow Irish gang known as Egan's Rats. Jelly Roll Hogan and William Egan had been Democratic political rivals for years, and constantly butted heads with each other in both the capitol building and the street. While their booze selling territories encroached upon each other, their two gangs didn't approach all-out warfare until the winter of 1921.

=== The Egan-Hogan War ===
The Egan-Hogan War of 1921-23 had its origins with a disgruntled Egan gangster named Max Greenberg, who was accused of cheating Willie Egan out of whiskey shipment. After an unsuccessful attempt on Greenberg's life on March 11, 1921, he defected to the Hogan Gang. It would later be rumored that Max paid three members of the Hogan crew $10,000 a piece to kill Willie Egan in front of his saloon at Fourteenth and Franklin on October 31, 1921. Egan gangster William "Dint" Colbeck reached his boss's side just after the shooting and later claimed that he said the shooters were James Hogan, Luke Kennedy, and John Doyle.

Both sides began gunning for each other, often putting innocent bystanders at risk. On December 30, 1921, James Hogan, Luke Kennedy, Abe Goldfeder, and Hogan Gang attorney Jacob Mackler were ambushed by a carload of Egan gunmen as they left police headquarters in downtown St. Louis. Kennedy was severely wounded in the leg while a shotgun blast tore Mackler's derby from his head (he was miraculously unhurt). A week later, one of Willie Egan's accused killers, John Doyle, was shot and killed by St. Louis police after a high-speed pursuit through Old North St. Louis. As the war dragged into the New Year, the Hogans absorbed most of the casualties. Luke Kennedy, still recuperating from his wounds, was trapped in what is now Wellston on April 17, 1922 and shot to death. Informant Ray Renard later said Kennedy's killers briefly taunted him before they opened fire.

Jelly Roll Hogan and his crew retaliated by shooting up Dint Colbeck's Washington Avenue plumbing store, which earned them a counterstrike the next day, when the Egan mob did a drive-by shooting of Hogan's home at 3035 Cass Avenue; the gang boss's parents were forced to dive for cover. By this time, the St. Louis citizenry had become appalled by the open gang violence. A local priest, Monsignor Timothy Dempsey, privately interviewed members of both gangs and persuaded them to agree to make peace in June 1922. Soon after this, several armed Hogan gangsters escorted Max Greenberg to Union Station and put him on a train to New York.

The treaty left Egan's Rats as the dominant bootlegging mob in St. Louis, but their members continued to antagonize the defeated Hogan Gang. At one point after a bank robbery, Egan gangster Chippy Robinson called the police anonymously and claimed that the Hogans were responsible. Jelly Roll and some of his men were indeed arrested because of the tip; all were cleared of the charges. More seriously, on September 2, 1922, Dint Colbeck and three of his men stumbled across Hogan gangsters Abe Goldfeder and Max Gordon in the Bottoms, chased them down Locust Street, and nearly killed them with pistol fire (Gordon lost an eye in the shooting).

The peace treaty was finally broken for good on February 21, 1923, when Dint Colbeck and his men ambushed and killed Hogan lawyer Jacob Mackler in Old North St. Louis. Gang shootings swept the city once again. Jelly Roll Hogan's Cass Avenue home was shot up once again on March 22, 1923. Hogan and Humbert Costello traded shots with a carload of Egans while racing up North Grand Boulevard (the Rats's coupe struck and crippled a 12-year-old schoolboy). When his attackers, Isadore Londe and Elmer Runge, were brought before him at the police station, Jelly Roll Hogan was asked if he could identify them. He snarled, "I'll identify them with a shotgun!"

By now, public outcry had reached a fever pitch; some quarters openly discussed bringing in the U.S. Marines or National Guard to restore order. It was ultimately the work of Monsignor Tim Dempsey, several police officials, and a St. Louis Star reporter that brought the war to a final end. Both Colbeck and Hogan wrote letters to the people of St. Louis telling them that their feud was finished; both letters were published in the Star. Other than an impulsive, unsuccessful attempt on the life of James Hogan in September 1923, the Egan-Hogan War was over.

=== Aftermath ===
While losers in the gang war, Jelly Roll Hogan and his men ultimately had the last laugh, as Egan's Rats would dissolve under a flurry of inter-gang murders and federal mail robbery indictments. Hogan and his men expanded their territory into south St. Louis County and made a fortune by selling illegal beer and liquor for the rest of Prohibition. Hogan himself would later go on to serve four terms in the Missouri State Senate. Jelly Roll Hogan died of natural causes on August 11, 1963, at the age of 77.

=== Other media ===
The Hogan Gang is mentioned in the Tennessee Williams play The Glass Menagerie.
