= Raymond Howard (Missouri politician) =

American politician

Member of the Missouri Senate from the 5th district
- In office January 3, 1969 – January 3, 1977
- Preceded by: Michael Kinney
- Succeeded by: J. B. Banks

Personal details
- Born: March 13, 1935 (age 91) St. Louis, Missouri
- Party: Democratic
- Spouse: Sharon Cecile Enoex
- Children: 2
- Education: University of Wisconsin–Madison, Saint Louis University School of Law
- Occupation: lawyer

Raymond Howard (born March 13, 1935) is an American politician who served in the Missouri Senate and the Missouri House of Representatives. He was previously elected to the Missouri House of Representatives in 1964, serving until 1968. Howard served in the U.S. Army as a paratrooper in the 82nd Airborne, reaching the rank of lieutenant.

In 1968, Howard defeated Michael Kinney, the longest-serving elected official in Missouri, if not the United States. In 1976, Howard was defeated for re-election by J. B. Banks by 417 votes.

In 2014, he was inducted into the National Bar Association Hall of Fame.
