= Jake Lingle =

American journalist (1891–1930)

- Screenshot from The Mystery of Al Capone's Vaults (1986)
- Born: Alfred Lingle; July 2, 1891; Chicago, Illinois, United States
- Died: June 9, 1930 (aged 38); Chicago, Illinois, United States
- Cause of death: Gunshot to back of head
- Body discovered: Found June 9, 1930 in a Chicago train station
- Resting place: Mount Carmel Cemetery
- Education: John Calhoun North Elementary (8th grade)
- Occupations: Journalist, crime reporter
- Years active: 1912–1930
- Employer: Chicago Tribune
- Known for: Working with Al Capone
- Opponent: Leo Vincent Brothers
- Spouse: Helen Sullivan
- Children: 2

Alfred "Jake" Lingle (July 2, 1891 – June 9, 1930) was an American reporter for the Chicago Tribune. He was shot dead gangland-style in the underpass leading to the Illinois Central Randolph Street station on the afternoon on June 9, 1930, as dozens of people watched. The man convicted of the murder was Leo Vincent Brothers.

Lingle was initially lionized as a martyred journalist, but it was eventually revealed that he was involved in racketeering with the Capone organization and that his death had more to do with his own criminal activities than his journalism.

== Early life ==
Jake Lingle was born on July 2, 1891, and raised on the West Side of Chicago. When he was eight years old, his parents converted from Judaism to Roman Catholicism. He received an education up to the eighth grade at John Calhoun North Elementary. His longtime friend, William F. Russell, later became the police commissioner in Chicago. Before becoming an office boy for the Chicago Tribune, Lingle played semi-professional baseball and worked for a surgical supply company.

== Career ==
Jake Lingle began his career in journalism in 1912. Lingle was known for his work as a legman covering gang-related crime stories. He reported from the scene by telephone to a writer at the Chicago Tribune office and then that person would write up his story. During this period, Lingle made connections outside journalism, and while he earned $65 ($1,065 in 2021 money) a week reporting, he had more than $60,000 ($982,875 in 2021 money) in the bank.

== Death ==
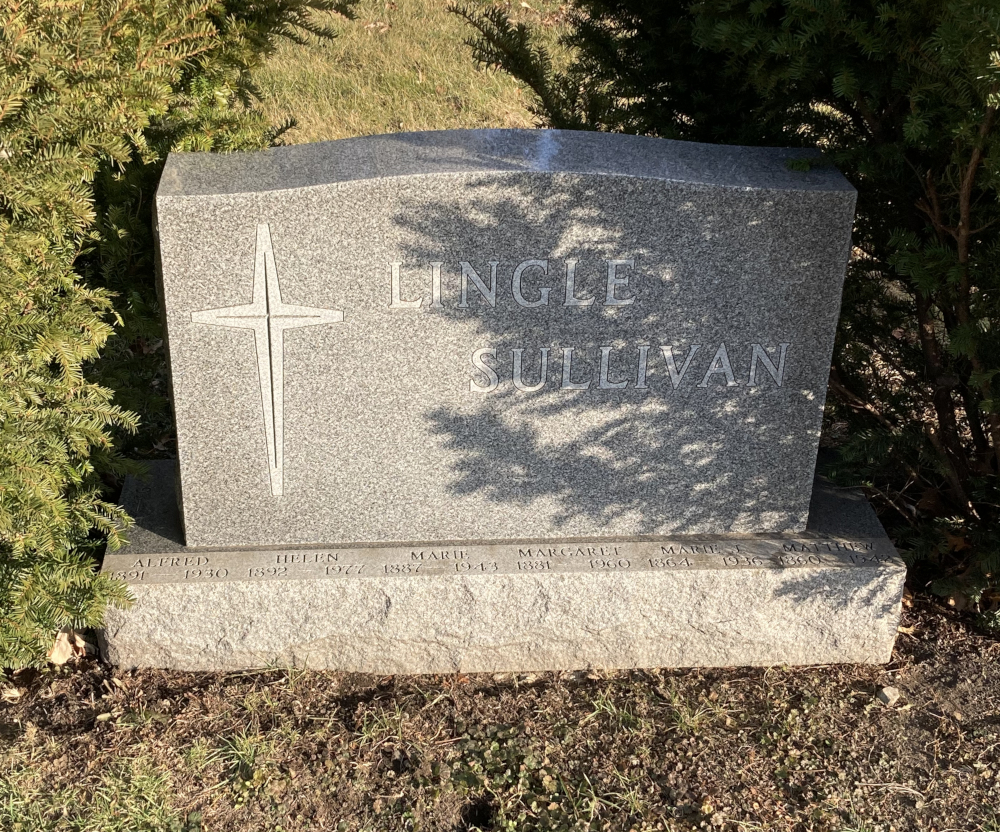
Lingle's grave at Mount Carmel Cemetery in Hillside, Illinois

In Chicago, on the afternoon of June 9, 1930, Lingle left the Sherman House Hotel, where he had conversed with some power brokers, to catch the 1:30 pm train to a racetrack in Homewood where he gambled on horses. On his way through the Randolph Street Terminal, he was followed by two men. One of them, described as thin, with blonde hair, and blue eyes, raised his .38 caliber pistol and shot Lingle once directly in the back of the head, killing him.

=== Investigation ===
To find the killer quickly, the Chicago Tribune told readers the newspaper would give them a $25,000 reward if they had information that led them to the killer. Other local newspaper companies said they would throw in an extra $30,000. ($55,000 = $900,969 in 2021 money.)

In January 1931, the police received a tip and arrested a man by the name of Leo Vincent Brothers from St. Louis, Missouri. Many people swore that he was Lingle's killer. Others, including Brothers himself, denied his involvement. Convicted, Brothers was given the minimum sentence for murder of 14 years, and he served 8 years of the sentence.

=== Discoveries ===
Lingle's death brought to the public's attention his connections with gangsters. Lingle turned out to have been setting the price of beer in Chicago and involved in organized dog racing and gambling. He had maintained two homes plus a suite at the Morrison Hotel and had a six-figure stockbroker account. High-placed friends of his in the police department resigned. Not only did people discover what Lingle's occupation really was, but they also learned about the gangs and about those with whom Lingle was associated.

=== Reactions ===
Lingle had initially been considered a martyr, and an immense crowd attended his funeral in the West Jackson Boulevard District, with mourners overflowing onto the street outside the Our Lady of Sorrows Basilica.

However, once other journalists learned about Jake Lingle's association with mobsters and his gambling activity, they began questioning the Chicago Tribune about it. In response, the Tribune said that it had not been aware of Lingle's activities. However, Frank Wilson, an IRS agent, said Robert McCormick, who was the Tribune's proprietor, had arranged a meeting between Lingle and himself when he was investigating the Al Capone case, and claimed this proved that the Tribune knew about Jake Lingle's involvement with gangs.

== In popular culture ==
The book Jake Lingle, or Chicago on the Spot by John Boettiger, published in October 1931 by E.P. Dutton & Co., gave a detailed account of the investigation into Lingle's killing and the resulting capture, trial and conviction of Leo Brothers. Boettiger, a fellow reporter for the Chicago Tribune, had known Lingle for ten years and was assigned by the paper to cover the story of his murder.

The 1931 film The Finger Points was loosely based on Lingle's life and death, and starred Richard Barthelmess as the reporter, Fay Wray as his love interest, and Clark Gable as the gangster who corrupts him.

In 1959, the Jake Lingle murder was dramatized on a television episode of The Untouchables titled "The Jake Lingle Killing," in which Lingle is portrayed by Herb Vigran.

In the 1959 film Al Capone, Martin Balsam played a fictional corrupt reporter named Mac Keely, who was Lingle in all but name.

In the 1979 film The Lady in Red, Lingle is seen as the reporter harassing John Dillinger's escort/girlfriend, Polly Hamilton (called "Polly Franklin" in this film). But this is fiction, as Dillinger first met Hamilton in 1934, four years after Lingle's murder.

The 1988 novel by Howard Browne, Pork City, depicts Lingle's murder and the subsequent investigation by the Cook County State's Attorney's office.

In the 1993 series The Untouchables, Jake Lingle's murder is depicted in the two-part story, "Murder Ink," and is portrayed by David Perkovich.

== See also ==
- List of homicides in Illinois § Organized crime
