= Thomas Kinney =

American politician

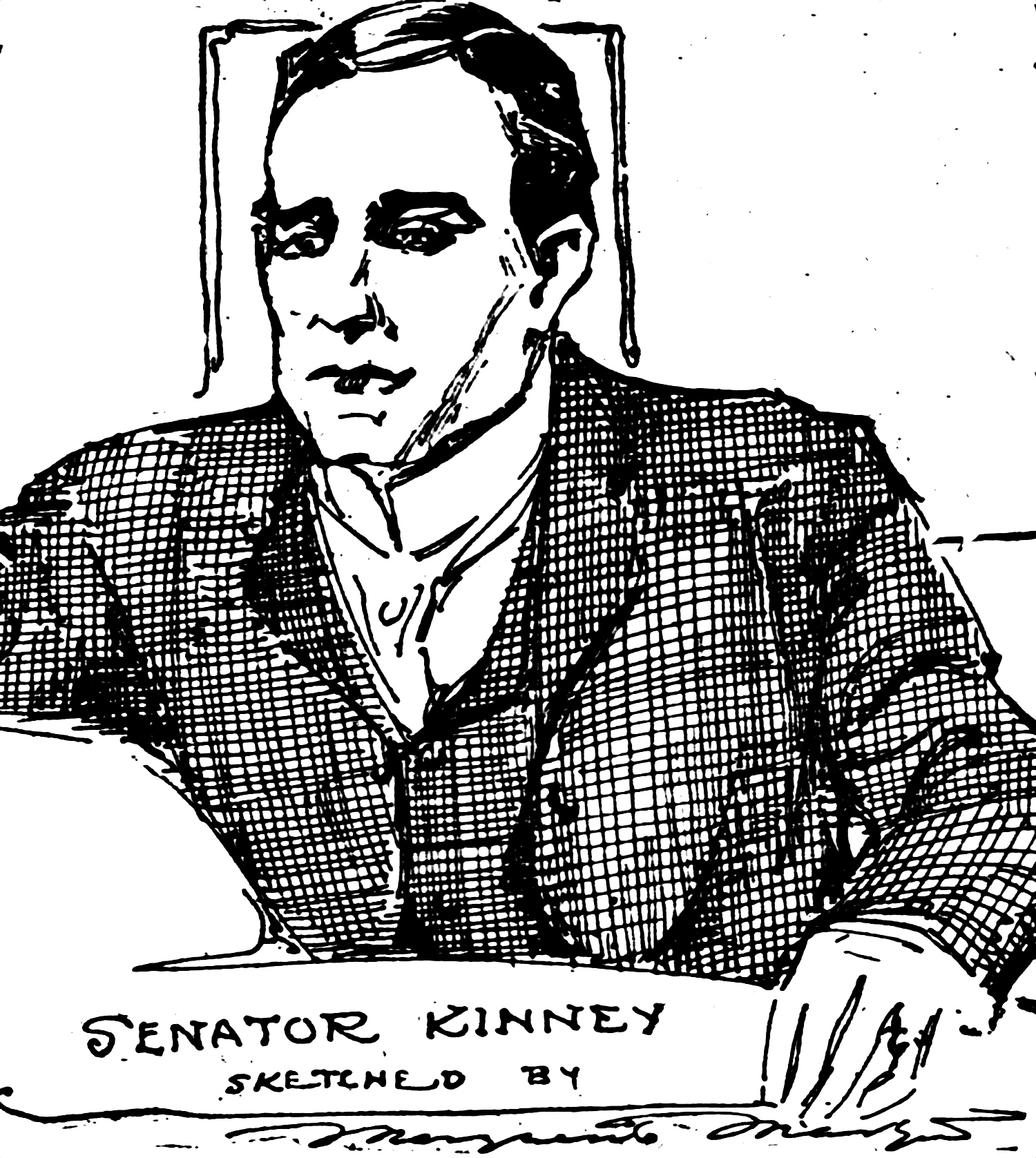
- State Senator Thomas Kinney as sketched by Marguerite Martyn in 1909
- Born: March 3, 1868; St. Louis, Missouri, U.S.
- Died: May 15, 1912 (aged 44); St. Louis, Missouri, U.S.
- Other name: Snake
- Occupations: Politician, mob boss

Thomas Kinney (March 3, 1868 – May 15, 1912), nicknamed "Snake", was a Missouri state senator and organized crime figure in St. Louis in the early 20th century. He was one of the founding members of the infamous Egan's Rats gang.

The Irish-American Thomas "Snake" Kinney was born and raised in St. Louis's "Kerry Patch" neighborhood (a part of what is now Carr Square). He and his brothers, Michael and William, worked as newsboys during the late 19th century. Tom would always snatch the biggest bundle of papers for himself in the morning, but always square accounts with his victim at the end of the day. One newsboy who had been victimized by Kinney complained to a local beat cop, who exclaimed, "That little Kinney sneaked the papers!" The policeman spoke with a thick Irish brogue, so "sneaked" came out sounding like "snaked", hence Kinney's nickname.

Despite his slender build, Kinney was known as a tough street fighter. He and his family lived on Collins Street, across from the Egan family. Thomas Egan, six years younger than Tom, grew to be his best friend. In the late 1880s, Snake Kinney was a neighborhood pool hustler and all-around crook when he entertained the idea for running for office. Kinney was elected to the St. Louis city Democratic City Committee in 1890. Kinney's friends, a street gang headed by Tom Egan, ensured many of Democratic votes at election time for their friend. By 1894, Snake Kinney ran a saloon at Second and Carr, which served as a headquarters for the "Ashley Street Gang", soon to be known as the Egan's Rats.

Kinney and his thugs specialized in armed robbery, burglary, and extortion. Snake's biggest early rival was George "Baldy" Higgins, an alcoholic sadist who was jealous of Snake's success. Kinney killed Higgins in a street fight in the early morning hours of September 20, 1896. Snake was acquitted on a charge of self-defense. Kinney eventually married Tom Egan's sister Catherine, with whom he had a daughter named Florence.

By 1901, Snake Kinney and his crew, now one of the most powerful gangs in the city, had formed an alliance with St. Louis Police Board Head Harry Hawes, forming a powerful combine against rival gang leaders, including John "Bad Jack" Williams, John "Cuddy Mack" McGillicuddy, and John "Baldy" Ryan. While Snake Kinney was a personable and able legislator, he always retained his street sense and temper. On February 19, 1904, he was charged with verbally abusing and shooting a black lounge singer named Walter Sloan. After this incident, Tom Egan took over the street gang, which soon became known as the Egan's Rats.

In November 1904, Tom Kinney was elected to the Missouri state senate, representing his St. Louis district. Kinney was able to turn out a staggering number of votes at the polls for the candidates of his choosing, due to the muscle of the Egan gang. Kinney, despite his gangster roots, was known for creating landmark Missouri legislation curtailing child labor and limiting women to working only eight-hour days. He also formed an alliance with Louis Lemp, a St. Louis brewing magnate who proved a valuable ally for the senator.

Tom Kinney was defeated in November 1910 for a U.S. Congress seat, and soon after was diagnosed with tuberculosis, from which he died of on May 15, 1912. Kinney's brother-in-law Tom Egan suspected his 1910 defeat was the result of a double-crossing political ally named Michael Gill, who betrayed Snake to advance his own ambitions. Egan and his goons complied such a large tally for Gill's opponent in the 1912 election, the congressman was speechless upon his defeat.

The gang that Snake Kinney helped found endured as the most powerful St. Louis criminal organization until the early 1920s.
