= Thomas Egan (gangster) =

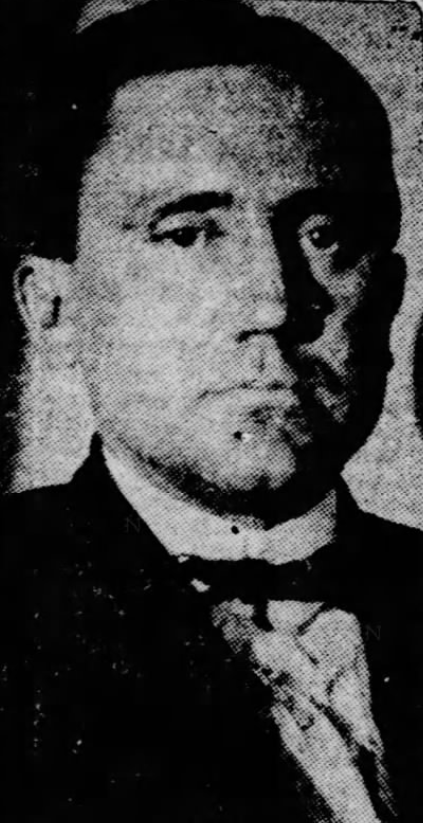
- Born: November 1, 1874; St. Louis, Missouri, United States
- Died: April 20, 1919 (aged 44); United States
- Occupations: Gangster, politician

Thomas Egan (November 1, 1874 – April 20, 1919) was an American politician and organized crime figure involved in bootlegging and illegal gambling in St. Louis, Missouri. Egan was the namesake of the infamous Egan's Rats.

The son of an Irish-American saloonkeeper, Egan was born and raised in Kerry Patch, then known as the riverfront Irish ghetto of St. Louis. With some of his childhood pals, he began running with a local gang of thugs, known as the Ashley Street Gang. Egan's best friend, Thomas "Snake" Kinney, was a local street tough and Democratic politician. During an ill-fated burglary attempt on October 17, 1894, Egan was shot through the face by a policeman. Tom survived but was left with an ugly scar on his jaw. Throughout the years, his stock in the gang climbed. By 1904, when Snake Kinney was elected to the Missouri State Senate, Tom Egan had taken over leadership of the street gang.

On the night of January 15, 1907, Tom Egan shot one of his longtime enemies, Willie Gagel, to death in the Jolly Five Club. While his men were booked at the police station, the desk sergeant snarled that they were all a bunch of "rats", thereby giving the Egan Gang their famous moniker; Egan's Rats. Acquitted of Gagel's murder, Egan was soon confronted by one of his top men, James "Kid" Wilson, whom he suspected was having an affair with his wife Nellie. Egan shot Wilson dead on October 22, 1907 and was eventually acquitted.

Serving as both a city constable and leader of the St. Louis Democratic City Committee, Egan was one of the most powerful gangsters in all the Midwest by the time of the death of his brother-in-law Tom Kinney on May 15, 1912.

That same year, Egan gave an interview to the St. Louis Post-Dispatch, in which he flaunted his power and clout in the underworld. In one famous sentence, Egan boasted, "...we don't shoot unless we know who is present," sounding eerily like Bugsy Siegel saying forty years later, "We only kill each other." Knowing that the up-and-coming Prohibition movement would become the law of the land, Tom Egan set up a liquor smuggling network as early as the mid-1910s.

In January 1916, Egan's saloon headquarters at Broadway and Carr streets was padlocked by police after one of the original Egan's Rats, William "Skippy" Rohan, was shot dead on the premises. Despite this, Tom Egan remained on top of the St. Louis underworld until he was diagnosed with Bright's Disease in late 1918. Egan died at the age of 44 on April 20, 1919. Tom's younger brother William took over leadership of the Egan's Rats.
