= Frank Wortman =

American crime boss (1904–1968)

- Born: Frank L. Wortman; December 4, 1904; St. Louis, Missouri, United States
- Died: August 3, 1968; St. Louis, Missouri
- Other name: "Buster" Wortman
- Occupations: vending business owner, restaurant/night club owner, burglar, bootlegger, gambler, criminal gang leader
- Allegiance: Shelton Brothers Gang

Frank L. "Buster" Wortman (December 4, 1904 – August 3, 1968) was an American St. Louis-area bootlegger, gambler, criminal gang leader, and a former member of the Shelton Brothers Gang during Prohibition. Wortman would eventually succeed the Sheltons, and take over St. Louis's gambling operations in southwest Illinois until his death.

== Early life ==
The son of an East St. Louis fire captain, Wortman spent his early years living in north St. Louis. John Worthmann, his grandfather, worked as a proofreader for the St. Louis Post-Dispatch and was killed when struck by a streetcar in 1894. Frank Wortman turned to crime in his late teens and was arrested for burglary. By 1926, he had begun running errands for the bootlegging Shelton Brothers. During the late 1920s and early 1930s, Wortman was a prominent member of the gang, acting as an enforcer in southern Illinois.

== Time in Leavenworth ==
In 1933, a federal agent was beaten during a raid on one of the Sheltons' distilleries, which Wortman had been guarding. He was taken into custody along with his associate, Monroe "Blackie" Armes. The two were convicted and sentenced to imprisonment in Leavenworth Federal Penitentiary. Wortman served his sentence from 1934 to 1941, gaining an early release. Contrary to sensationalized reporting and stories over the years, Wortman served no time in Alcatraz prison.

During Wortman's incarceration, the federal prohibition amendment of 1919 was repealed, which again legalized liquor sales in the U.S. in 1933.

== War with the Sheltons ==
Following his release in 1941, Wortman briefly worked as a steamfitter before organizing an army of gunmen whose ranks included "Black" Charlie Harris, Elmer Sylvester "Dutch" Dowling, and brothers Monroe and Tony Armes. He then launched a campaign to drive the Sheltons from southern Illinois.

Establishing Wortman's Plaza Amusement Company, he soon obtained a virtual monopoly on gambling, specifically slot machines, pinball machines, horse parlors, crap games and card games. He also established legitimate businesses, including trucking firms and taverns, run by his younger brother Ted. Ted lived on a horse farm on Illinois Route 157 on the north end of Caseyville, about one mile (1.6 km) from the elder Wortman.

By the late 1940s, Wortman had assumed control over illegal gambling in southern Illinois and St. Louis.

== Kingpin of St. Louis ==
Involved in local politics as a young adult, by the 1950s Wortman reportedly had extensive political connections on both sides of the Missouri-Illinois border, including Illinois politician and state auditor Orville Enoch Hodge, who was convicted of embezzling more than $1 million in taxes in 1956.

That same year, Wortman assaulted an IRS agent at The Paddock tavern, which led to his being audited. On February 26, 1962, he was charged with two associates of conspiracy to evade taxes, but all three were eventually acquitted.

In the mid-1950s, Wortman moved from his ranch-style brick home in Collinsville at 2 Crown Drive to a new house in the east end of Collinsville. This new "fortress" was surrounded by a water-filled moat with the only access being a narrow bridge.

During the 1960s, a Black street gang known as The Warlords began moving in on Wortman's territory, and in one incident threw a hand grenade into McCoy's Tavern. With the threat of retaliation, members of Wortman's organization were able to intimidate the street gang into backing off.

== Later years ==
Although his power began to decline in his later years, suffering financial losses from legal battles and closure of gambling operations, Wortman remained in control of southern Illinois gambling until his death on August 3, 1968, at age 63, in Alexian Brothers Hospital due to complications from surgery for laryngeal cancer. Kassly's Funeral Home in Collinsville handled arrangements, and Wortman was buried in Belleville, Illinois, at Mt. Carmel Cemetery. Ironically, Wortman lies some 3.6 meters (12 ft) from his chief nemesis, East St. Louis policeman Robert "Tree" Sweeney, who killed 12 men in the line of duty.

Gambling was legalized in East St. Louis after Wortman's death, and the local gambling casino is now the city's largest employer.
