= William Egan (gangster) =

American gangster (1884–1921)

- Born: June 7, 1884; St. Louis, Missouri, U.S.
- Died: October 31, 1921 (aged 37); St. Louis, Missouri, U.S.
- Occupations: Gangster, politician

William Egan (June 7, 1884 – October 31, 1921) was a St. Louis politician and organized crime figure involved in bootlegging and illegal gambling. His brother was the namesake of the infamous Egan's Rats.

The son of an Irish-American saloonkeeper, Egan was born and raised in the Kerry Patch, then known as the riverfront Irish ghetto of St. Louis. By his teens, Willie had followed his older brother Thomas into the Kinney Gang. By the time Tom took over the street gang in 1904, nineteen-year-old Willie was one of his best men. The Rats, at this point in time, specialized in political terrorism, armed robbery, extortion, and bootlegging. With the murder of Egan gangster Sam Young on April 4, 1909, Willie Egan inherited his saloon at the corner of Fourteenth and Franklin streets, which would remain a gang headquarters for over ten years.

Generally quiet and reserved, Willie was nonetheless a tough street fighter who proved himself time and time again in action. However, Willie wasn't as passionate and gregarious as his older brother Tom was. When original Egan's Rat William "Skippy" Rohan was gunned down in Tom's saloon on January 8, 1916, Tom Egan made plans to kill the shooter, Rat gangster Harry "Cherries" Dunn. Willie successfully argued from Dunn's life, only to have "Cherries" go berserk later that year, killing Egan allies for trivial reasons. Willie tracked his former pal to the Typo Press Club on the night of September 19, 1916 and watched as two of his men shot and killed Dunn. This touched off a gang war with the remnant of the old Bottoms Gang, a longtime rival of the Egan's Rats. The Egans would ultimately prevail, eliminating the Bottoms Gang once and for all.

Upon Tom Egan's 1919 death, Willie took control of the Egan mob. He served as a constable under Judge Andy Gazzolo and a member of the Democratic City Committee. His right-hand man, William "Dint" Colbeck, served as his sergeant-at-arms. While Willie tried to maintain the gang's bootlegging rackets, the younger members, known as "red hots", began looking to high-risk robberies as a source of income.

Willie Egan split with his long-time friend, Max Greenberg, when Maxie chiseled Egan out of a whiskey shipment. While the two conversed on a downtown street corner on March 11, 1921, a gunman appeared out of nowhere and began shooting. Greenberg was shot through the face and another man, John Sweeney, was killed. Willie Egan himself was shot in the arm. It was widely believed that Willie engineered the attempt of Maxie's life. After recovering and boasting connections to New York bootlegger Arnold Rothstein, Max Greenberg signed on with the Hogan Gang.

While standing out in front of his Franklin Avenue saloon on Halloween night, 1921, Willie Egan was fatally shot by gunmen in a passing automobile. It was said he gasped the names of his killers to Dint Colbeck, who rushed to his aid just after the shooting. Colbeck announced to his men that the shooters were James Hogan, John Doyle, and Luke Kennedy. The ensuing gang war rocked St. Louis and claimed well over a dozen lives (including those of Doyle and Kennedy).
