= Michael Kinney =

American politician

Member of the Missouri Senate from the 31st district
- In office January 8, 1913 – January 8, 1969
- Preceded by: Thomas Kinney
- Succeeded by: Raymond Howard

Personal details
- Born: January 13, 1875
- Died: February 19, 1971 (aged 96) Jefferson City, Missouri
- Party: Democratic
- Occupation: politician, attorney

Michael Kinney (January 13, 1875 – February 19, 1971) was a lawyer and state legislator in Missouri. He served on the Missouri Senate for over 50 years. He succeeded his brother, Senator Thomas Kinney, who died in office in 1912. In 1968, Kinney was defeated for re-election by Raymond Howard. At the time of his defeat, he was the longest-serving elected official in Missouri, if not the United States. He died in 1971.
