= 1997 United Parcel Service strike =

1997 strike in the United States

United Parcel Service strike of 1997
- Part of Labor Unions
- Date: August 1–19, 1997 (18 days)
- Location: United States

Number
185,000 Teamsters	

The United Parcel Service strike of 1997, led by International Brotherhood of Teamsters (IBT) President Ron Carey, started on August 4, 1997, and involved over 185,000 Teamsters (IBT members). The strike effectively shut down United Parcel Service (UPS) operations for 15 days and costs UPS hundreds of millions of dollars. The strike was a victory for the union, resulting in a new contract that increased their wages, secured their existing benefits and gave increased job security.

== Union history ==
President Ron Carey had followed in his father's footsteps to become a UPS driver, and Union member. Carey rose to Presidency of the Teamsters Union in the early 1990s, and was heavily supported by Teamsters for a Democratic Union (TDU) President Ken Paff, mainly because of Carey's support of Union Democracy. TDU influence on the IBT was a major factor in the collective bargaining tactics used to negotiate the 1997 UPS Contract: militancy, union democracy, and rank-and-file intensive tactics.

An earlier strike against UPS in 1994, which had been the first national strike against UPS, had been unsuccessful and led to the Teamsters being sued by UPS for millions of dollars.

== Causes ==
Contracts between UPS and their Union workers were set to be renegotiated in 1997, and general grievances against the company centered around job security, wages, and part-time employee status. Bob Herbert, of The New York Times wrote that the UPS strike "is best seen as the angry fist-waving response of the frustrated American worker, a revolt against the ruthless treatment of workers by so many powerful corporations."

The main reason for the strike was UPS's heavy reliance on part-time workers. The Teamsters Union said that part-timers were underpaid, did not receive benefits, and had less opportunities for full-time work. A more thorough explanation of UPS's labor policies could improve the article's detail. This may include data showing that 60% of UPS workers were part-timers at the time, which was a significant cause of friction for the union.

In the 1970s, UPS had begun a process of replacing many full-time workers with part-time employees. In the 1980s, the wages of these part-time workers was cut to just $8 per hour. According to research performed by Teamsters, almost two-in-three workers were classified as part-time, and receiving part-time compensation and benefits. Surveys conducted by Teamster leaders stated that "90 percent of part-timers at UPS ranked the creation of more full-time jobs with full-time pay as a top bargaining priority".

The Bureau of Labor Statistics cites the 1993 UPS injury rate as 14 percent, compared with the industry average 8 percent.

== Preparation ==
Prior to the 1997 UPS strike, Carey had already organized four successful strike campaigns. In preparation for the strike, UPS workers who had joined the Teamsters completed questionnaires designed to determine key grievances. Pre-strike rallies were held, and a petition with 100,000 signatures of Teamster members supporting the new contract negotiations and demands was completed. The impending strike also had its own website, as well as a dedicated hot-line for workers to stay connected. Efforts were made to ensure that both part-time and full-time workers' demands were being included, and therefore that they would continue to support each other. The expectation was that many workers would simply cross the picket lines and resume working.

After an unsuccessful August 1997 Teamster rally, which had had a poor turnout, and a UPS spokesperson said "They're trying to stage a Broadway production of Les Misérables, and what we're seeing is a high school production of Annie Get Your Gun". Teamsters rejected UPS's final offer on August 2, 1997.

== The strike ==
The strike began August 4, 1997, and was the largest strike in terms of striking workers that the country had seen thus far. Almost 100 percent of UPS workers who were members of the Teamster Union were involved in the strike. During the strike, UPS losses were over $600 million.

Carey said regarding the strike, "People will be celebrating our victory over corporate greed. This fight with UPS shows what working people can accomplish when they all stick together. The UPS workers stood up to throw away worker approach and the nation's working people stood behind us. And now we're going to go out there to other workers who want to fight for that great American dream."

== Outcome ==
During the strike, the Teamster Union had paid out around $10 million to workers manning the picket lines. After 15 days, the Teamsters and UPS came to a five-year contract agreement that ended the strike. In addition, the starting pay rate of $8 per hour for part-timers was to be raised by 50 cents, while drivers were to make an additional $3.10 on top of their average $19.95 hourly rate, and part-time workers would be granted an additional $4.10 hourly.

The way in which the union was structured meant that all Teamsters would receive synonymous benefits, regardless of what company they actually worked for. These benefits were controlled by the Teamsters multi-employer pension fund. UPS wanted to back out of the plan, and offer their workers a new pension plan that UPS would control. Ultimately, UPS agreed to keep their workers in the union benefits plan.

UPS agreed that they would from now on be required to discuss any future package weight limit increases with the Teamsters.

To address the unavailability of full-time positions, UPS agreed to stop subcontracting, with the exception of peak times and to create 10,000 full-time jobs from part-time positions.

== See also ==
- List of US strikes by size
