= Ken Paff =

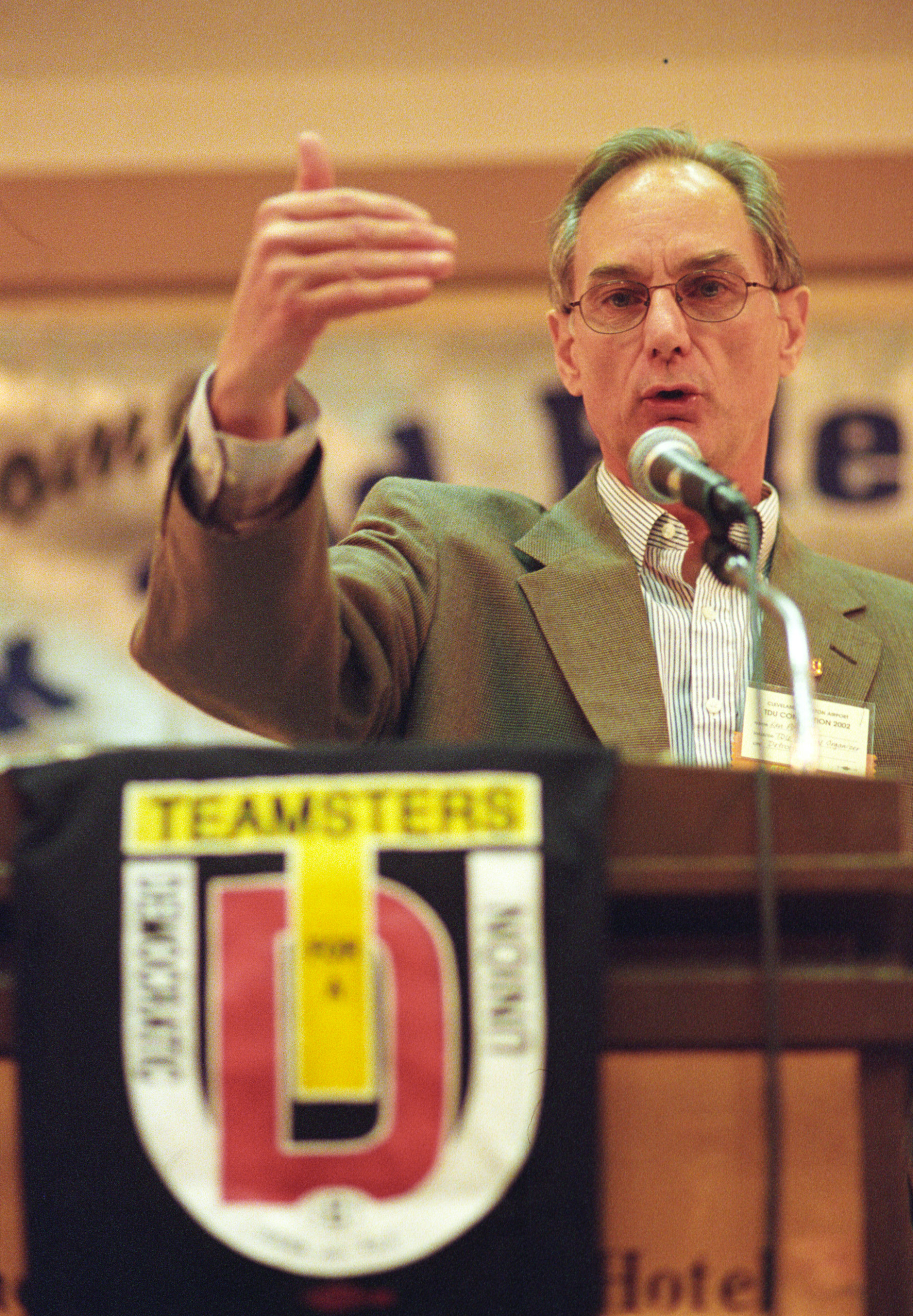
- Ken Paff, National Organizer of Teamsters for a Democratic Union
- Born: May 16, 1946; Beaver Falls, Pennsylvania, U.S.
- Occupation: Labor movement activist/leader
- Website: http://www.tdu.org

Kenneth T. Paff (born May 16, 1946 in Beaver Falls, Pennsylvania) is one of the founders and current National Organizer of Teamsters for a Democratic Union, a rank-and-file union democracy movement organizing to reform the International Brotherhood of Teamsters (IBT), or Teamsters.

== Early years ==
Ken Paff was born in Beaver Falls, Pennsylvania, a small Rust Belt town near Pittsburgh. He was the son of a union steelworker and a homemaker, the youngest of seven children. In 1956, when Paff was ten, his parents divorced, and he moved to Santa Ana, California with his mother, where he attended high school.

== Early activism ==
In 1964 he gained admission to the University of California, Berkeley, where he went to study physics. There he became involved in the Free Speech Movement and the civil rights movement. After receiving his bachelor's degree, Paff began a Ph.D. program in physics at UC Berkeley, but quickly abandoned his studies to focus on movement activism. His first exposure to labor movement activism was in 1970 as a supporter of Cesar Chavez's United Farm Workers union, when he leafleted supermarkets in support of striking farmworkers in the Salinas Valley. During this time he worked briefly as a computer programmer, then a teacher, but did not feel that either profession suited him.

== Building Teamster reform ==
Paff eventually found work as a truck driver in California, and soon moved to Cleveland, where he took a job with Shippers Dispatch, which was bought out by Preston Trucking. As a driver for Preston he became a member of Teamsters Local 407, the major freight local in the Cleveland area.

At Shippers and Preston, Paff connected with rank and file workers across the Midwest who had been active in previous Teamster efforts such as Teamsters United Rank and File (TURF), and he got involved with starting a new Teamster reform organization. It was initially called Teamsters for a Decent Contract (TDC), since it was organized around mobilizing for the 1976 National Master Freight Agreement negotiations. At their founding convention at Kent State University outside of Cleveland in September 1976, TDC formally changed their name to Teamsters for a Democratic Union (TDU).

Being based in Cleveland, Paff and TDU drew the attention of Cleveland Teamster boss Jackie Presser, who would be elevated to Teamster General President in the 1980s. Indeed, Presser organized a contingent of retirees to picket the founding TDU Convention, and opposed TDU members who showed up at union meetings. He also enlisted the help of associates of Lyndon LaRouche to oppose the TDU. The LaRouche followers, along with a mix of Teamster officials and others, eventually created the Brotherhood of Loyal Americans and Strong Teamsters (BLAST) in opposition to the TDU.

== Expansion of TDU ==
Paff and the reformers continued to build their organization. As members saw how TDU was consistently standing up to the Teamster officialdom, TDU began to grow. By 1978, the movement was too big to run on a purely volunteer basis, and the TDU Steering Committee voted to hire Paff as its full-time National Organizer. Paff decided to leave his job at Preston, take a very large pay cut, and take the position, which he holds to this day. At that point, TDU also moved its headquarters from Cleveland to Detroit, which brought Paff to the Motor City.

As TDU's National Organizer, Paff has been a central force behind TDU's many accomplishments in the years since its founding, including defeating concessionary agreements such as the notorious freight "relief rider" that Presser attempted to foist on the membership in 1983, overturning the so-called "two-thirds" rule, which allowed contracts to be ratified with as little as one-third of the membership voting to approve, protecting Teamster members' pensions, and helping countless numbers of rank and file Teamsters learn their rights, run campaigns to reform their local union bylaws, run for shop steward, and win office to reform their locals.

One of Paff's best-known accomplishments is his work helping Teamster members win the right to vote for their top leadership. As detailed most clearly by author Kenneth Crowe, it was TDU's intervention with the Justice Department (assisted by attorneys Thomas Geoghegan and Paul Alan Levy of Public Citizen) that led the government to reject their initial plan to impose a government trusteeship of the IBT and opt instead for a system of government-supervised elections.

Once Teamster members won the right to vote for top officers, the Teamster reform movement then faced the problem of fielding a candidate to run for office. After extensive internal debate, TDU decided to endorse Ron Carey, head of New York Local 804, for Teamster General President at their 1989 convention. In the ensuing two years, Paff was the acknowledged "field general" of the grassroots operation that led dark horse reform candidate Carey to be elected to the top office in the IBT.

With Carey in office, TDU faced the new problem of how to redefine their relationship to a changed International Union. Although some thought that TDU's job was done now that Carey had been elected, Paff understood the continued necessity of an independent rank and file organization. "We need to be an independent movement that unites the best in the Teamsters, from top to bottom," he said. "The 1991 election opened up some important doors, but only the membership can complete the job we started." That necessity became abundantly clear as Teamster old guard officials, although no longer in power at the International level, continued to use their power at the local and Joint Council level to stonewall Carey's reform efforts, sparking a virtual civil war within the union. In response, TDU helped Teamster members organize to pressure their recalcitrant local leaders to get on board with Carey's mobilizing strategies, particularly surrounding national contract negotiations in carhaul, freight, and at UPS. Although difficult at first, that so-called "pincer" strategy—with a mobilized rank and file uniting with a reform leadership at the top to pressure the mid-level leadership—paid off, as evidenced by the landmark 1997 strike against UPS.

Soon after the UPS victory, however, TDU faced yet another, far more serious challenge, as Carey was removed from office when his campaign manager was caught laundering union money. In the subsequent 1998 rerun election he was replaced by old guard favorite James P. Hoffa. While some forecast TDU's demise, Paff worked with the rank and file TDU leadership to keep the reform movement on track. By keeping the movement focused on core substantive issues of union reform, such as contract campaign, member mobilization, and local union elections, Paff played an important role in guiding TDU through that difficult period.

== Organizing in Opposition ==
While TDU survived Carey's removal from office and the return of old-guard Teamster leadership under James P. Hoffa, it was a challenging period for the Teamster reform movement. Under Paff's leadership, TDU focused its efforts on local issues and national contract enforcement. It continued to play a key role in International Union politics, backing Oregon Local 206 head Tom Leedham's challenge to Hoffa's leadership in the 2001 and 2006 international elections, then New York Local 805 head Sandy Pope's campaign in 2011. While these were hard-fought campaigns, each came up short, garnering roughly one-third of the overall vote every time save for 2011, where Hoffa won with 59 percent of the vote in a three-way race.

Despite Hoffa's large electoral victory margins, this did not signal broad approval of his leadership. In particular, Teamsters covered by national contracts, such as freight, UPS, and carhaul workers, expressed growing frustration with the International. After years of eroding wages and working conditions, Teamster members started organizing to pressure their leadership to resist further givebacks. Paff and TDU played a coordinating role, helping to organize "vote no" campaigns in core Teamster industries. These began to bear fruit in the mid-2010s. At UPS, the largest Teamster employer, members narrowly ratified the 2014 national agreement by a 47-53 margin, but rejected 18 key local and regional supplements, preventing the contract from being ratified. After members rejected several attempts at renegotiating the supplements in three areas, the IBT leadership declared the contract ratified. At YRC Freight, the largest freight employer, members initially rejected a concessions-laden contract extension in January 2014 by nearly two-to-one, forcing the negotiating team back to the bargaining table. While the revised deal that members approved eliminated certain concessions, it retained a 15 percent wage cut and a reduction in pension contributions. In October 2015, carhaul members rejected the proposed master agreement by a 7-to-1 margin, then again by a slimmer margin in September 2016, only approving a revised deal in March 2017.

Meanwhile, there was growing concern over the solvency of Teamster pension funds, particularly the giant Central States Pension Fund. While the 2008 financial crisis was partly to blame, a bigger problem was that Teamster leaders had let key contributing employers walk away from their pension obligations, leaving the funds in dire shape. Adding to the crisis were the Wall Street financial firms that lost billions of dollars for Teamster funds while collecting large management fees. Faced with drastic cuts to promised benefits, Teamster members and retirees organized a pension protection committees with help from TDU. These committees built community alliances and pressured politicians for legislative solutions to the pension crisis. They successfully blocked Central States administrators' proposal to cut benefits in 2015, and built support for the Butch Lewis Act, named for a TDU leader and pension activist who died in 2015. The bill would offer low-interest loans to struggling funds in order to shore up their solvency.

Concerns about eroding wages, contract standards, and pension security fed into the 2016 election campaign, which pitted Hoffa against reform candidate Fred Zuckerman, head of Louisville, Kentucky Local 89. With Paff and TDU once again playing a key role in providing organizing infrastructure, Zuckerman's Teamsters United slate gained broad support among key layers of the Teamster membership, particularly those covered by national contracts. The slate almost defeated Hoffa, winning the popular vote among U.S. Teamsters and regional vice-president slots in the Central and Southern regions. Only when Canadian locals were included, where Teamsters United did not have the resources to campaign, did Hoffa prevail by a margin of roughly 6,000 votes out of 200,000 votes cast overall.

Despite narrowly avoiding defeat, Hoffa and his administration did not change course in the aftermath. They proceeded to negotiate a concessionary contract with UPS once again in 2018. Unlike the 2014 negotiations, the master agreement was rejected outright, with 55 percent voting no. Members also rejected several local and regional supplements, as well as the UPS Freight agreement. However, rather than returning to the bargaining table, the Teamster leadership declared the contract ratified. They used a provision in the Teamster constitution that gives the General President the power to ratify a contract when less than two-thirds vote to reject if less than 50 percent of affected members vote overall. With member dissatisfaction growing, Paff and TDU are already gearing up for the 2021 election.

Now in his fifth decade as National Organizer of TDU, Paff continues to assist rank-and-file Teamsters with workplace and union-related issues, advocate for greater internal democracy, and encourage union leadership to address concerns involving wages, benefits, and working conditions.

== Organizing philosophy ==
Those who have studied TDU's origins and its ability to persist over time have credited Paff's organizing strategy for much of its success. Kenneth Crowe notes that, while Paff could certainly be "stern" and even "caustic," he "provided the kind of egoless, highly organized, and determined leadership that the organization needed." "The key for us in TDU," as Paff explained it, "is faith in the members. You're going to have hope that ordinary people can do extraordinary things, because if they can't, there ain't gonna be no hope for the change we're interested in. We started out to change the union, and we ended up changing ourselves."

In keeping with his emphasis on faith in the members, Paff has developed and instilled an organizing culture within TDU that emphasizes local member initiative, and establishes a close connection between the staff, the elected leadership (known as the International Steering Committee, or ISC), and the membership. He also argued forcefully from TDU's inception that the movement should operate openly, not clandestinely. "The employers are going to find out about you," he said. "The people that aren't going to find out about you are the rank and file. We're going to put ourselves out there. We're going to take that chance. If they come after us, they're going to have to do it publicly."

Many analysts have credited TDU's model of mobilizing tactics and its long tradition of rank and file organizing as being key factors behind the successful 1997 strike at UPS.

== Awards and recognition ==
In 1988 Paff received the Nat Weinberg Award, given to "men and women who ... stubbornly refus[e] to accept defeat and...assert the right of working people to address and solve the problems that confront them." In 1996 he was named a Petra Fellow by the Petra Foundation, awarded to "unsung individuals making distinctive contributions to the rights, autonomy and dignity of others."

In 1996 Paff was portrayed in the movie Mother Trucker: The Diana Kilmury Story, a biographical film focusing on the life of longtime Teamster reform activist and former IBT International Vice President Diana Kilmury. His character was played by actor Robert Wisden.

In 2003, the late Studs Terkel published an interview he conducted with Paff as a chapter in his book Hope Dies Last: Keeping the Faith in Difficult Times.
