= Citizen Action =

US consumer and public activist group (1980s–1990s)

Citizen Action was a national liberal consumer and public activist group that was active in the United States during the 1980s and 1990s. State-level affiliates have continued on in Connecticut, New York, Ohio, and Wisconsin. The affiliates of Citizen Action are part of the People's Action national network.

== History ==
The origins of the group lies in various state-level organizations founded by veterans of Students for a Democratic Society and the Indochina Peace Campaign.

In 1980 a national organization called Citizen Action was formed as a federation of state groups in Ohio, Oregon, Connecticut, Massachusetts, and Illinois, with a national office in Washington, D.C. Its first president was Heather Booth and its first executive director was Ira Arlook. Some of the affiliates had their own history, with Connecticut Citizen Action Group being founded by Ralph Nader in 1970. Ohio Citizen Action was founded in 1975 as the Ohio Public Interest Campaign. The Citizens Action Coalition of Indiana was founded in 1974 and made its name in dealing with utility company rates and associated investigations.

The national group experienced various changes in membership during the 1980s due to financial and organizational ups and downs, but saw its role as putting pressure on the political system for policy issues it was concerned about. By the early 1990s the group had affiliates in 34 states. Its policy specialist Cathy Hurwit was a well-known figure in discussions about health care reform in the United States, and the group was a strong advocate for single-payer health care. Group funding often came from labor unions such as AFSCME, CWA, and ILGWU.

With the advent of the Clinton administration in 1993, the group began changing from being a nonpartisan grassroots organization to being a direct player in Democratic Party politics. Citizen Action argued publicly for single-payer health care, but behind the scenes worked to support the managed competition proposals of the 1993 Clinton health care plan as the only feasible approach. This created some unhappiness among members and aligned organizations.

The national group got heavily involved in the 1996 U.S. elections, including staging a $7 million education and get-out-the-vote drive. The effort was successful in putting many Republican congressional candidates on the defensive. However, this emphasis was to the dissatisfaction of some of its state affiliates; following the election, the Ohio and Indiana affiliates withdrew from the organization, taking away some 650,000 of the national group's 2 million members. A director for Ohio Citizen Action said, "what happened was a very old story: an office in Washington which was set up to serve the interests of states grew up to think it had created the states."

In 1997, Citizen Action got caught up in the Teamstergate affair, due to reports that the group was involved in improperly funding the 1996 reelection campaign of Teamsters president Ron Carey. Federal investigators found that Carey's advisers created an illegal contribution scheme in which the union gave $475,000 to Citizen Action; in return, Citizen Action and some of its donors gave more than $100,000 to a direct-mail firm under contract to the Carey campaign.

Financial contributions collapsed, and in late October 1997, the Citizen Action national office in Washington shut down and all 20 employees were laid off. Liberals mourned the loss of the national organization, although the individual state affiliates carried on with more than 400 employees among them.
