= Teamstergate =

Teamstergate was the name the Kentucky State Republican Party Executive Director Randy Kammerdiener called an apparent money swap between the 1996 Bill Clinton presidential campaign and the Ron Carey campaign to be reelected as president of the International Brotherhood of Teamsters. Carey campaigned on a platform of cleaning up corruption within the Teamsters Union that had forced imposition of federal scrutiny. Nevertheless, Carey was implicated in a money laundering corruption scandal that would revoke his narrow election victory.

The case involved $885,000 given from union general treasury to the 1996 Clinton–Gore campaign in exchange for the Clinton campaign's contributions to Ron Carey's re-election fund. Carey was running to keep the job of Teamsters union president. The exchange was an illegal swap that later resulted in a federal court's voiding of Carey's slim election victory against now Teamster President James P. Hoffa.

The swap occurred despite the federal government's expenditure of $20 million on federal monitors led by the Clinton administration Justice Department to ensure the union election would be above board. A 1988 lawsuit by the Bush administration was settled in March 1989 with a consent decree signed by the union and the government that allowed the federal monitors. The lawsuit was brought under the civil provisions of the Organized Crime Control Act of 1970, known as Racketeer Influenced and Corrupt Organizations Act (RICO). On November 19, 1999, a federal jury found Teamsters political director William W. Hamilton guilty of embezzlement for his part in the deal.

Ron Carey was acquitted in 2001 of charges stemming from the scandal.

== See also ==
- List of federal political scandals in the United States
