= James P. Hoffa =

American labor union leader (born 1941)

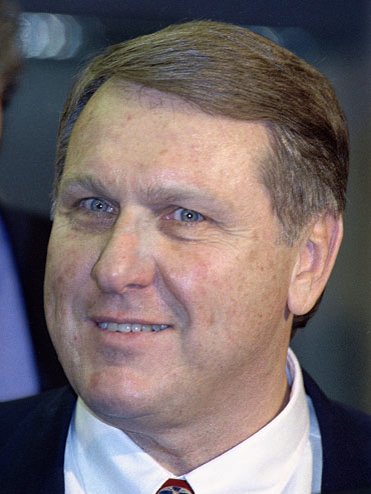
- Hoffa in 2004
- Born: James Phillip Hoffa; May 19, 1941 (age 85); Detroit, Michigan, U.S.
- Other name: James Hoffa Jr.
- Education: Michigan State University; University of Michigan
- Title: General President of the International Brotherhood of Teamsters (1998–2022)
- Spouse: Virginia Harris (m. 1969)
- Children: 2
- Parents: Jimmy Hoffa; Josephine (Poszywak) Hoffa
- Relatives: Barbara Ann Crancer (sister)

James Phillip Hoffa (born May 19, 1941), also known as James Hoffa Jr. or Jim Hoffa, is an American labor leader and attorney who served as the tenth General President of the International Brotherhood of Teamsters. He is the son of former Teamsters president Jimmy Hoffa. First elected in 1998, Hoffa was subsequently re-elected in 2001, 2006, 2011, and 2016, serving five consecutive five-year terms. In 2018, he was elected Chair of the Road Transport Section of the International Transport Workers' Federation during its quadrennial congress in Singapore. Hoffa is the second-longest-serving General President in the union’s history, following Dan Tobin, who held the position from 1907 to 1952. His final term concluded in 2022.

== Personal life ==
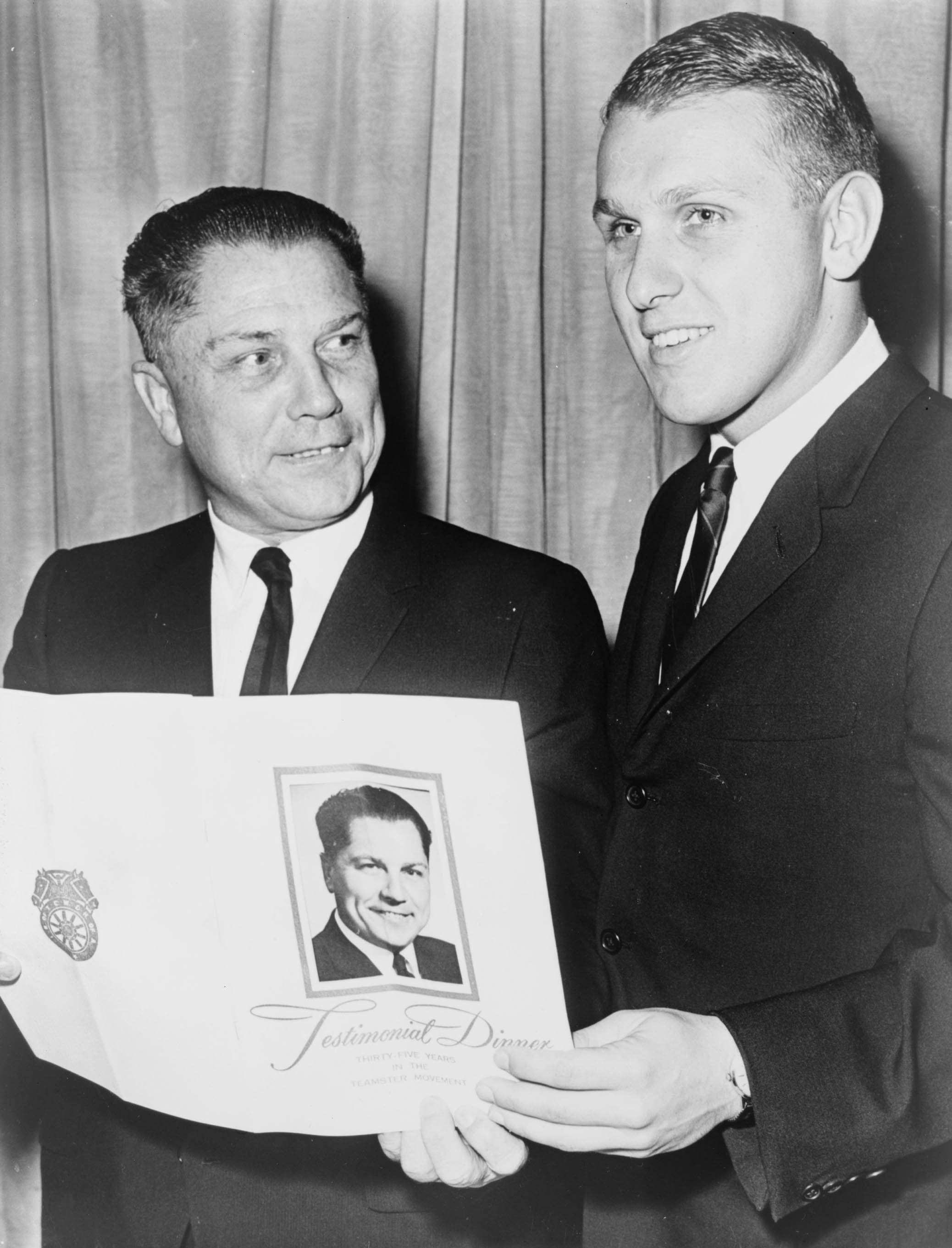
Hoffa (right) with his father in 1965

Hoffa is the son of Jimmy Hoffa, who served as General President of the Teamsters from 1957 to 1971, and Josephine (née Poszywak) Hoffa. He has one sister, Judge Barbara Ann Crancer. Hoffa is married to Virginia "Ginger" Sue Harris (b. 1945), a former teacher and licensed veterinary technician since 1969. They have two sons, David (b. 1970) and Geoffrey (b. 1972), and six grandchildren.

Born in Detroit, Michigan on May 19, 1941, Hoffa attended Cooley High School. There, he became a member of the National Honor Society, and an all-city and all-state football player. During the summer months, the Hoffa family visited their cottage in rural Orion Township outside Detroit.

Hoffa often accompanied his father to Teamster meetings and events, and became a Teamster in 1959 on his 18th birthday. Hoffa holds a degree in economics from Michigan State University (1963) and a Bachelor of Laws degree from the University of Michigan Law School (1966). Hoffa was awarded a Ford Foundation Fellowship to work in the Michigan State Senate as an aide to senate and house members doing constituent relations and research. Hoffa is a member of Alpha Tau Omega. He was an attorney for the Teamsters from 1968 to 1993.

== Teamsters activity ==
=== 2021 Election of International Union Officers ===
Following 23 years as the leader of the union, Hoffa announced his intent to retire at the end of his term and backed the Vairma-Herrera Teamsters Power Slate. In November 2021, the O'Brien-Zuckerman Teamsters United Slate beat the Hoffa-backed slate by a more than two-to-one margin. O'Brien and his slate were sworn into office on March 22, 2022, at Teamsters headquarters in Washington, D.C. On the day his administration was installed, O'Brien fired more than 80 employees at the headquarters. He did not offer any severance or extension of benefits to the terminated staff. The International Brotherhood of Teamsters currently faces charges with the National Labor Relations Board in connection the terminations. As of November 10, 2022, the union was required to pay eligible terminated employees more than $175,000 as part of a settlement with the District of Columbia Attorney General's Office for violating D.C. Code 32-1303.

=== 2021 Pension Reform ===
Hoffa led Teamster efforts to protect defined-benefit pension plans for more than a decade following the economic collapse of 2008. The legislation championed by Hoffa and the Teamsters was known as the Butch Lewis Act, named after a Teamster retiree pension activist, and became law as part of President Biden's American Rescue Plan stimulus package in 2021. As part of the ARP, more than 50 Teamster pension plans – including its largest, the Central States Pension Fund – are eligible for assistance at the outset of the bill's enactment, with more of the union's plans becoming eligible in 2022. Under the new law, money to assist eligible plans will come directly from the U.S. Treasury Department in the form of grants which would not need to be repaid. Plan participants will receive 100 percent of their earned pension benefits.

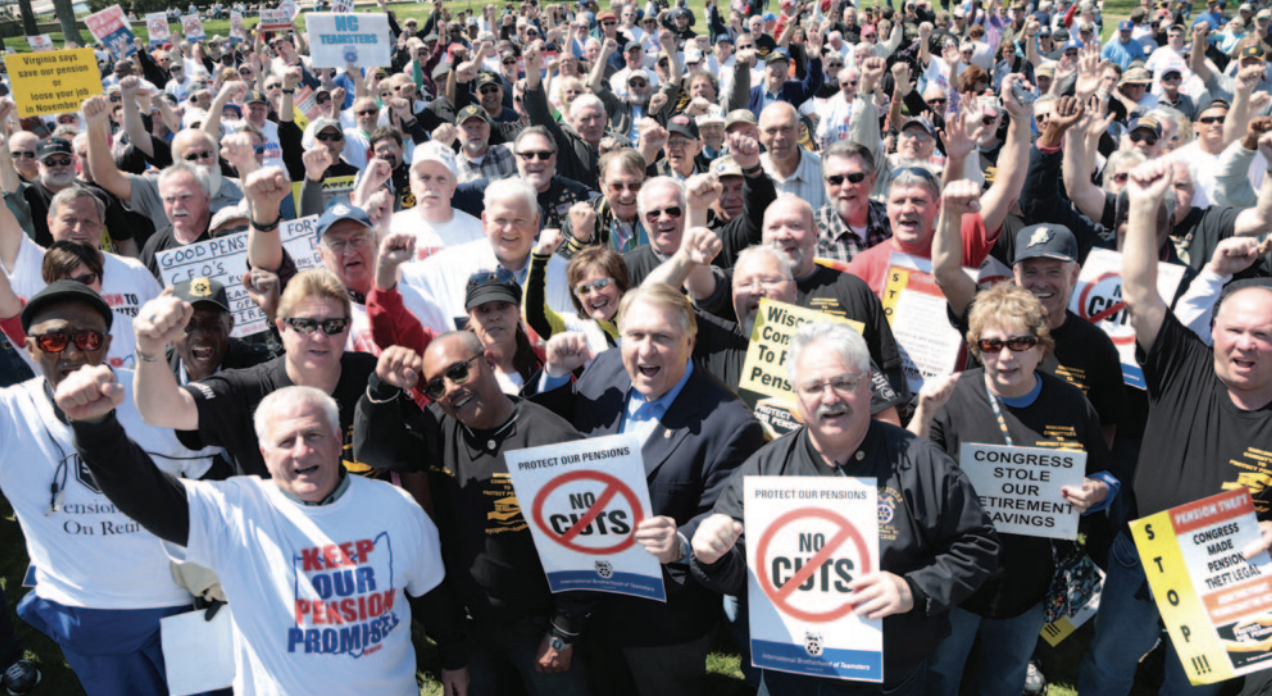

=== Appointments ===
(2019 – Present) Chair, Road Section, International Transport Workers Federation; (2019 – Present) Member, Executive Board, International Transport Workers Federation; (2015 – Present) Board Member, Roosevelt Institute; (2010 – Present) USTR Advisory Committee on Trade Policy and Negotiations; (2009 – Present) Department of Labor Advisory Committee for Trade Negotiations and Trade Policy; (2013 – 2015) National Freight Advisory Committee; (2002 – 2004) President's Council on the 21st Century Workforce; (2002 – 2004) Secretary of Energy's Advisory Board

=== Legislative activities during tenure ===
Hoffa earned a reputation as an advocate for fair trade and worker safety. He transformed the Teamsters into a premier political force by changing alliances and rhetoric unpredictably.

Under his leadership, the Teamsters ended a federal program that allowed Mexican truckers to haul goods beyond the border zone in the United States. The Teamsters strongly opposed a trade deal with Colombia through lobbying and street protests, and were credited with helping to prevent a similar trade deal with Panama.

The Teamsters successfully encouraged Congress to pass legislation increasing rail security in 2007.

The Teamsters sued the Bush administration in 2005 to overturn regulations that extended the number of hours a driver could spend behind the wheel of a truck. The Teamsters argued the rule would contribute to driver fatigue. The Circuit Court of Appeals for the District of Columbia sided with the Teamsters, but it was the Obama administration that finally agreed to change the rule.

Under his leadership, the Teamsters ended a federal program in 2009 that allowed Mexican truckers to haul goods beyond the border zone in the United States. Hoffa predicted the failure of a second version of the program in October 2011, and challenged it in federal court.

=== George Washington University ===
In 2008, Hoffa established the Teamsters Labor History Research Center and the Teamsters archives at the George Washington University Gelman Library in Washington, D.C.

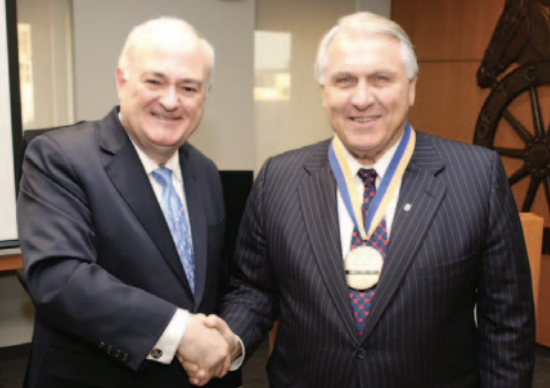
Steven Knapp and James Hoffa (right) in 2014.

Hoffa was awarded the university's President's Medal in 2014. "George Washington is proud to honor Jim Hoffa as a passionate advocate for social justice and the labor movement, as one of the foremost experts on labor issues, and also as a dedicated partner and friend of this university," said Steven Knapp, GW President.

=== 1996 campaign ===
Hoffa campaigned against the Teamsters incumbent president, Ron Carey, at the Teamsters international convention of June 1996 in Philadelphia. After nearly 500,000 votes were cast in early November 1996, Ron Carey had won the election with 52 percent of the vote. At the time Carey characterized the victory as one for "reformers in the American labor movement."

Five months later, in April 1997, news broke that a federal grand jury was investigating Hoffa led allegations that Ron Carey had received illegal campaign kickbacks and employer contributions during the Teamsters election the previous year. The union has been supervised by a court-appointed administrator ever since a consent decree with the Justice Department in 1989.

A new election for Teamsters president was ordered by the federal government in August 1997, after federal official Barbara Zack Quindel's investigation uncovered a "complex network of schemes" that involved the improper use of Teamster assets.

Quindel found that the Carey campaign had received more than $220,000 in illegal contributions. Ultimately, the Independent Review Board found that more than $750,000 in union assets had been used in Carey's 1996 reelection campaign.

During the 1998 election Tom Leedham, then-director of the Teamsters Warehouse Division, campaigned against James P. Hoffa. Campaigning to unite the union, Hoffa won the election. After having lost narrowly in 1996 to Ron Carey, Hoffa's new role as president was considered by Teamster members as a chance to rebuild the union.

Hoffa was re-elected in 2001, 2006, 2011, and 2016 to five-year terms.

=== 1999 ===
"The first big test of the Hoffa administration" after abruptly walking away from the Overnite Transportation organization effort that Ron Carey had all but won, was the ratification in June 1999, of a four-year contract covering 13,000 carhaul members after an unprecedented amount of communication in the form of rallies, newsletters, and a telephone hotline that was called more than 20,000 times over the course of the contract campaign. Solidarity rallies in Detroit, Los Angeles, and Nashville attracted more than 6,000 carhaulers, family members, and friends. The new contract averted a national strike and included pension gains, job security language, and significant wage increases.

"The new union leader is being closely watched in part because he has pledged to restore unity in Teamsters' ranks in the wake of a divisive campaign finance scandal."

Two thousand full-time jobs were created after Teamster pressure on United Parcel Service (UPS) as part of the commitment made by the 1997 contract won by Ron Carey. "My administration sent UPS management a very clear message. We expect UPS to meet their obligations under the 1997 agreement, and we will not tolerate company delays or numbers manipulation."

=== 2000s and 2010s ===
In April 2000, more than 8,000 flight attendants at Northwest Airlines voted to ratify a new contract with improvements in compensation and retirement packages and ending a 3½ year labor dispute.

Casino workers in Detroit saw an end to biased wages and a disregard for seniority with their new collective bargaining agreement ratified in 2001. The new agreement initiated immediate wage parity between casinos in addition to wage increases in each year of the three-year contract.

Demonstrating increased strength and confidence in Teamster representation Champion Air flight attendants voted for their first Teamster contract in March 2001. The contract resulted in improved pay rates, hours of service, working conditions, and benefits. Union protection remained in effect until the airline ceased all operations on May 31, 2008.

After a month-long strike, bus drivers at Laidlaw Education Services in Los Angeles ratified a new contract in April 2002. The strike occurred due to the disparity between the wages and benefits of drivers who are direct employees of the Los Angeles Unified School District and those paid by Laidlaw.

A landmark agreement with UPS was reached in July 2002 for the 210,000 Teamsters employed there. Hoping to avoid a damaging strike similar to the one in 1997, negotiators at UPS acquiesced to Teamster demands, producing a contract with a 25% increase in wages and benefits. "These negotiations have taken place in an economic climate in which millions of American workers are seeing their health benefits cut and their retirement savings wiped out. We have shown the nation that job and benefit cuts are not inevitable," said Hoffa.

Mechanics at Continental Airlines ratified a four-year contract resulting in wage and benefit increases in December 2002. This was the second Teamster contract for the 3,300 mechanics and one that made subcontracting nearly impossible due to its defining all maintenance work as being within the jurisdiction of the Teamsters. Continental Airlines was merged into United Airlines in 2012.

A new contract for 65,000 drivers working under the Teamsters National Master Freight Agreement was reached in February 2003. The contract restored the union's right to strike when there was a deadlock over grievances, a right given up under a previous contract of 1994. "The nation is in the depths of recession and on the brink of war, and we maintained our strong health care benefits, protected our pensions and won the highest wage increases in more than a decade," said Hoffa.

Carhaulers ratified a new, five-year contract that protected health benefits and pensions and provided job security for the more than 6,500 members nationwide. The contract included increases of wages and benefits by 13.4% over the term of the agreement.

Chicago area trash haulers represented by the Teamsters reached an agreement in October 2003, ending a nine-day garbage strike that left local officials begging for the garbage trucks. The new contract included higher wages and improvements to health benefits and pensions and covered 3,300 solid waste hauling workers.

Anheuser-Busch Teamsters ratified a new, five-year agreement in December 2003. The Teamsters Union won a guarantee from the company that prohibits the closing of any of its 12 breweries in the United States. Wage increases, free health care, and increased pension benefits were all included in the contract covering 7,500 Teamster members nationwide.

- President George W. Bush appointed Hoffa to the Advisory Committee for Trade Policy and Negotiations (ACTPN). "U.S. trade policy has not focused on the economic impact of unfair trade deals on working families. We must shape a trade policy that meets the needs of working families and ends the economic race to the bottom."
- Members of the Brotherhood of Locomotive Engineers (BLE) voted to merge with the Teamsters Union by an 80% majority. With 32,000 active members, the BLE was one of the oldest labor organizations in the country. The BLE became the first members of the newly created Teamsters Rail Conference. Soon after merging with the Teamsters, the BLE changed its name to the Brotherhood of Locomotive Engineers and Trainmen (BLET) in recognition of the trainmen of the union.
- In October 2004, members of the Brotherhood of Maintenance of Way Employees (BMWE) voted to become Teamsters. More than 75% of the BMWE's members voted to merge with the Teamsters Union and become part of the growing Teamsters Rail Conference. "As did my father, I have envisioned one union representing all transportation workers – roads to rails, ports to planes –that would provide workers with real power on the job and the political arena."
- A majority of the members of the Graphic Communications International Union (GCIU) voted to merge with the Teamsters Union effective January 2005, making it the third independent union to merge with the Teamsters in 18 months. The union becomes an "autonomous conference" of the Teamsters.

Employees of Allied Waste/BFI in the Atlanta area ratified their first Teamster contract in December 2005. The second-largest U.S. trash hauler, Allied Waste agreed to labor contracts that cover more than 450 workers. The Teamsters secured agreements after a year and half of bargaining during which the company tried to demoralize the union and its members by granting raises to workers in non-union location shops and intimidating union supporters. "These contracts are a testament to the workers' courage and determination, and a major step forward in our battle to raise living standards for waste workers across the South," said Hoffa at the time of the victory.

The Teamsters started contract negotiations in September 2006 with UPS over its package workers' contract and initial bargaining at a UPS Freight terminal in Indianapolis, Indiana. Ken Hall, Director of the Teamsters Parcel and Small Package Division said that the initial contract at the UPS Freight terminal in Indianapolis would serve "as a template or a model for other locations."

A new, five-year contract was ratified by NetJets mechanics, aircraft fuelers, cleaners, and stock clerks in January 2007. "At NetJets, Teamsters are making real gains despite negative trends elsewhere," said Allen Price, Teamsters Local 284 President. The contract covers 143 workers.

A tentative agreement was reached for Teamster members working at Costco in California in January 2007. More than 13,000 workers at 40 locations in the state are covered under the agreement.

Members of the Brotherhood of Maintenance of Way Employees (BMWED) and Brotherhood of Locomotive Engineers and Trainmen (BLET) ratified a new contract for those working on the nation's freight rail lines. The agreement includes general wage increases totaling 17 percent (18.2 percent compounded over the life of the agreement), which will remain effective until December 31, 2009. Both the BMWED and BLET are members of the Teamsters Rail Conference.

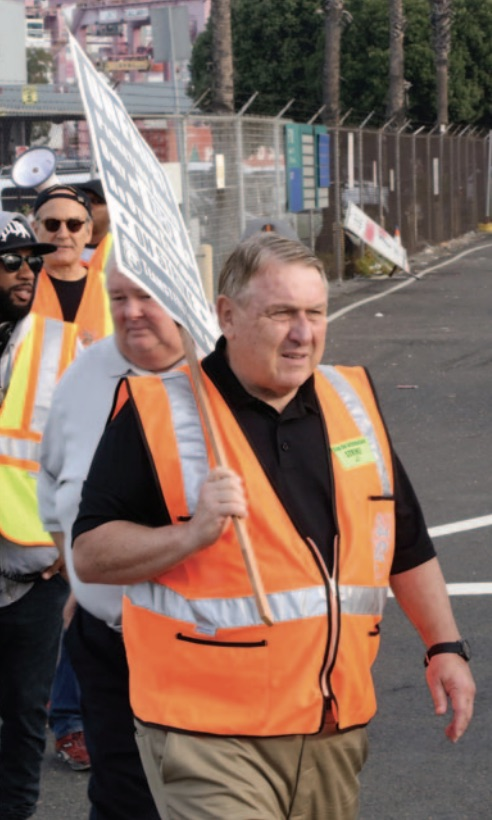
Hoffa walking the picket line with striking Port of Los Angeles drivers

Indianapolis Teamsters working at UPS Freight voted to ratify their first contract in October 2007. The agreement will improve wages, benefits, and working conditions. "For more than 50 years, workers at UPS Freight's predecessor, Overnite, fought to win a Teamster contract. Today the union fulfilled its promise that we would not quit until workers achieved economic justice."

UPS Teamsters approved a new contract in November 2007 with a five-year term covering 240,000 workers. The contract will increase wages annually and increase funds that provide pension, health, and welfare benefits. "We…have negotiated an agreement that will greatly benefit our members at U.P.S. as well as Teamster members in other industries covered by pension and health and welfare funds."

Teamster freight members ratified agreed to a Memorandum of Understanding in February 2008 after Hoffa had them "vote until they got it right" . Covering 60,000 workers at YRC Worldwide, Yellow Transportation, Roadway and regional units at USF Holland and New Penn Motor Express. The Memorandum of Understanding included a 15% wage concession, loss of a vacation week, and reduced pension contributions.

On February 20, 2008, Hoffa became the first major union leader to endorse Democratic senator Barack Obama in his bid to become president of the United States. Hoffa campaigned in major states for Obama throughout the primary and general election. He served as a superdelegate to the 2008 Democratic National Convention in Denver and a member of the Michigan Electoral College.

On March 11, 2008, members of the Brotherhood of Maintenance Way Employes (BMWED), part of the Teamsters Rail Conference, approved a new contract with Amtrak after eight years of negotiations. Workers, who had been working for sub-par rates for the past several years, will receive increases of wages and benefits.

Workers at DHL Express ratified a new national agreement in early May 2008. These were the first national agreements negotiated by the Teamsters Union in more than 30 years. "The vote from DHL Express members is a strong signal of support. We were determined to obtain the best contract that we could for members, and I believe we achieved that," said Hoffa.

Several months after DHL signed the agreement with the Teamsters eliminating the strike clause, more than 85% of the union drivers were laid off. This contract ultimately led to the demise of the union drivers at DHL. Facilities such as DTW (Romulus, Michigan), which had nearly 200 union drivers, now have only approximately 25 drivers in which most of these workers came from the Troy and Southfield location. In all Teamsters Local 299 lost approximately 375 union jobs as the outcome of this contract as well as several thousand jobs throughout the United States.

Teamster carhaulers ratified a new three-year national agreement on October 24, 2008. A record level of employer contributions towards health, welfare, and pension benefits were won by the union by the agreement covering approximately 8,100 workers.

Gaining a 15% wage increase over five years, Teamsters working at Anheuser-Busch facilities in the U.S. voted in a new agreement on November 7, 2008. The contract included the promise that Anheuser-Busch, recently acquired by InBev, would keep all 12 U.S. breweries open for the life of the contract.

For the first time in nearly 40 years, pressmen at the Los Angeles Times voted in a Teamster contract in December 2008. The 250 men and women working in the press operations section of the newspaper voted in their first collective bargaining agreement with the Graphic Communications Conference of the Teamsters.

On September 14, pilots with Amerijet Cargo approved their first contract after five years of negotiations. Workers at Amerijet, an air freight carrier, had been on strike since August 27 partly due to the unsanitary conditions on the aircraft. The company will reinstall bathrooms on the aircraft as part of the contract agreement.

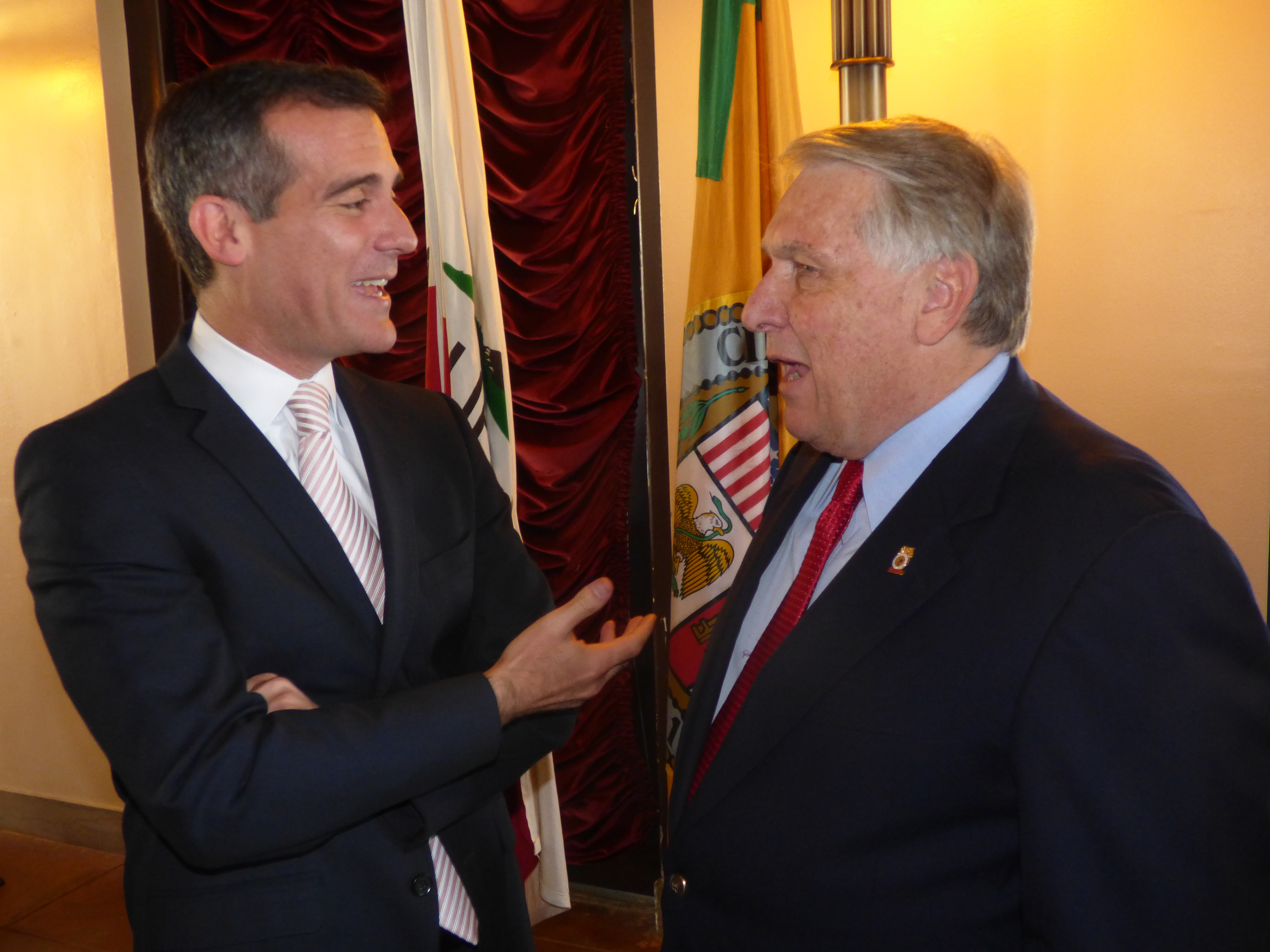
Hoffa with the Mayor of Los Angeles Eric Garcetti in 2017

For the last 14 months, Hoffa managed the Teamsters' effort as the union worked with YRC Worldwide (YRCW) as the country's largest less-than-truckload company struggled during the recession after their less than strategic, needless purchases of Roadway and USF Holland which Hoffa failed to oppose. The Teamsters and YRCW reached a labor cost savings agreement in August, and YRCW reached new bank terms with its lenders at the end of October.

But in December, Hoffa sent letters to the Securities and Exchange Commission, state attorneys general, state insurance officials and Congressional leaders on financial industry oversight calling on regulators to review the questionable promotion of credit default swaps for bonds of YRCW. Hoffa urged the oversight bodies to investigate financial firms that were underwriting and/or marketing basis packages that consist of YRCW bonds and credit default swaps.

Two days after the letters were sent, YRCW announced it had obtained the necessary thresholds on its bond holder debt-to-equity exchange offer, which was the final part of a comprehensive restructuring plan that required all major stakeholders—its workers, pension funds, secured lenders and bond holders—to contribute toward helping the company survive the worst business decisions in generations.

Hoffa and the Teamsters were credited in several news reports for helping YRCW avert bankruptcy. Bloomberg said Goldman Sachs helped YRCW complete the debt swap after the "Teamsters Union said the bank was trying to profit from a failure of the largest U.S. trucker by sales."

Hoffa was re-elected to a fourth term heading the Teamsters Union in November 2011. He won nearly 59% of the vote for another five-year term.

The three-way race was between Hoffa, Fred Gegare, and Sandy Pope. Gegare is a Wisconsin Teamster, trustee on a pension fund and a Teamsters International Vice President. Pope was the president of Teamsters Local 805 in New York City.

On May 14, 2019, on PBS NewsHour, Hoffa endorsed President Trump's use of tariffs and a trade war with China. He stated that his hope was that the tariffs would work to open the Chinese market for American goods long kept out, and that in the long run, opening the Chinese market would create more American jobs.

== Labor Day speech ==
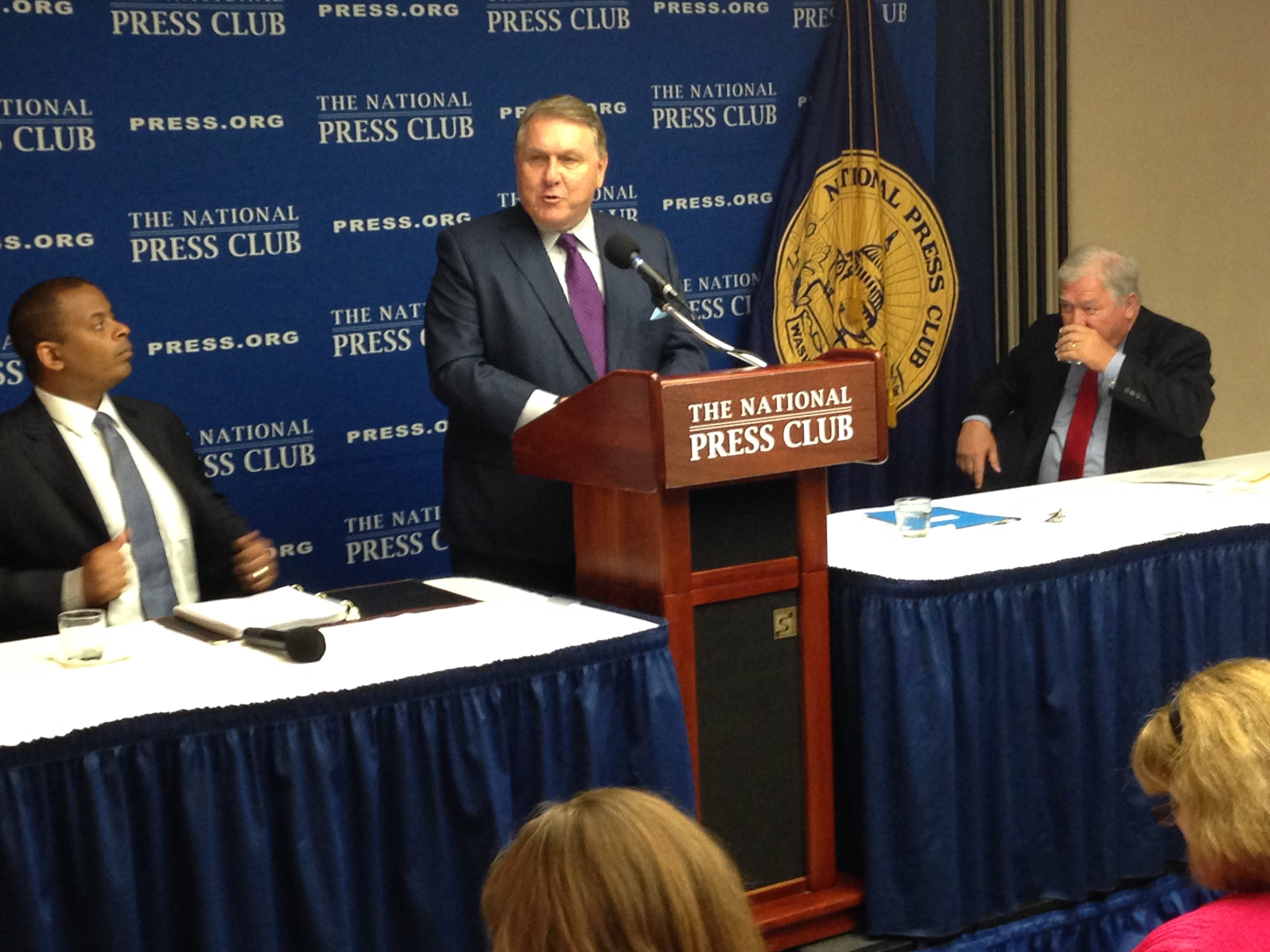
Hoffa speaks at the National Press Club in Washington D.C.

On September 5, 2011, he caused some controversy when introducing President Obama at a Labor Day rally in Detroit, Michigan. In his remarks, an animated Hoffa stated "We have to keep an eye on the battle we face—a war on workers. And you see it everywhere there is the Tea Party. And you know there is only one way to beat and win that war. The one thing about working people is we like a good fight. And you know what, they've got a war, they've got a war with us and there is only going to be one winner. It is going to be the workers of Michigan and America – we are going to win that war. All the way." He then urged the audience to vote in the coming election and in reference to the Tea Party, stated, "Everybody here's got to vote," Hoffa said. "If we go back and we keep the eye on the prize, let's take these sons-of-a-bitches out and give America back to America where we belong!"

Following the fiery remarks, some conservative media outlets chastised the Democratic Party and President Obama for not condemning Hoffa for using violent rhetoric of the kind some claimed as leading to the 2011 Tucson Shooting, while the White House Press Secretary Jay Carney said, "Mr. Hoffa speaks for himself, he speaks for the labor movement...The president speaks for himself." However, Hoffa responded to the controversy by stating, "We didn't start this war—the right wing did. My comments on Labor Day in Detroit echo the anger and frustration of American workers who are under attack by corporate-funded politicians who want to destroy the middle class. We're tired of seeing good-paying jobs shipped overseas. This fight is about the economy, it's about jobs and it's about rebuilding America. As I said yesterday in Detroit, we all have to vote in order to take these anti-worker politicians out of office. We're fighting back. That's what Teamsters do—we stand up for what is right," Hoffa said. "I will never apologize for standing up for my fellow Teamsters and all American workers." National Review's Jonah Goldberg supported Hoffa's language, if not the content, saying "We are in a really weird place where the head of the Teamsters can't talk tough. I mean, I guess ex-cons are the only ones left who can still talk like men every now and then." Goldberg went on to state that the issue was not the language, but the "absolutely bizarre standard" for language established after Tucson.

Some commentators and journalists have charged that the context of the quote was changed by editing out the "Everybody here's got to vote" passage by the news organization; Fox News Channel and other media outlets, thus fueling the controversy by making the speech sound like a call for violence instead of a call to vote.

== Organizing successes ==
Hoffa led a resurgence of the Teamsters resulting in a net increase of members in 2007, the first year of net growth in the union in nearly three decades.

Significant organizing victories included more than 12,600 workers at UPS Freight, 9,000 mechanics at United Airlines, 22,000 school bus drivers at First Student/FirstGroup since 2006 under the union's Drive Up Standards campaign, 3,200 customer service representatives at America West Airlines, and nearly 900 crewmembers of Atlas Air, Inc. and Polar Air Cargo Worldwide. In 2009, more than 1,700 school bus workers employed at the Baumann transportation companies on Long Island joined the union.

The organizing victory at UPS Freight was particularly noteworthy, because it is the former Overnite Transportation, which the union struggled to organize for many years and Ron Carey had ready to sign a contract, when Hoffa framed him and walked away from the organization effort. The campaign got a major boost when UPS purchased Overnite, and it became UPS Freight.

"This [UPS Freight] is the largest organizing victory in the freight industry in 25 years. We were amazed that at the 90-day mark of our national campaign, 9,900 workers had signed cards. This shows the workers' commitment in joining a union that will give them a strong voice in the workplace."

"We announced two goals for the Teamsters in 2008: To organize 40,000 workers and to elect Barack Obama President of the United States. I am proud to say that thanks to the hard work by so many in our union, the Teamsters delivered on both promises."

The union's successful organizing plan has emphasized the Teamster core industries—particularly those in the global supply chain—and the management of Hoffa and the Teamsters Organizing Department involved the entire union. The bulk of the organizing resulted from coordinated, disciplined campaigns in which numerous Teamster local unions and Joint Councils participated.

Organizing has been a minor theme of Hoffa's administration, culminating in 2005, when the Teamsters Union left the AFL–CIO to found the new Change to Win Federation with emphasis on organizing and growth. The union has achieved an annual increase in organizing gains every year since, with 2008 marking a record-breaking year. Hundreds of volunteer member organizers have arranged worker-to-worker contacts between Teamsters and unorganized workers in the same craft.

In 2009, the Teamsters began a project to recruit and train 1,000 member organizers before the end of 2009 to be ready when the Employee Free Choice Act is passed.

"There is no better spokesperson for the Teamsters than a Teamster like you," Hoffa said. "We are engaged in national campaigns that will test the resources of the union. Without a mighty army of Teamster member organizers, we're not going to get it done."

"We formed our union with the Teamsters so we could have an opportunity to negotiate for fair pay, benefits and equal treatment," said Nicole Miles, a monitor at First Student in Parkville, Missouri and Local 838 member. "Coming from a Teamster family, I supported the Teamsters because I wanted to be part of a union that will support me. I'm proud of our vote to join the Teamsters."

== Split from the AFL–CIO ==
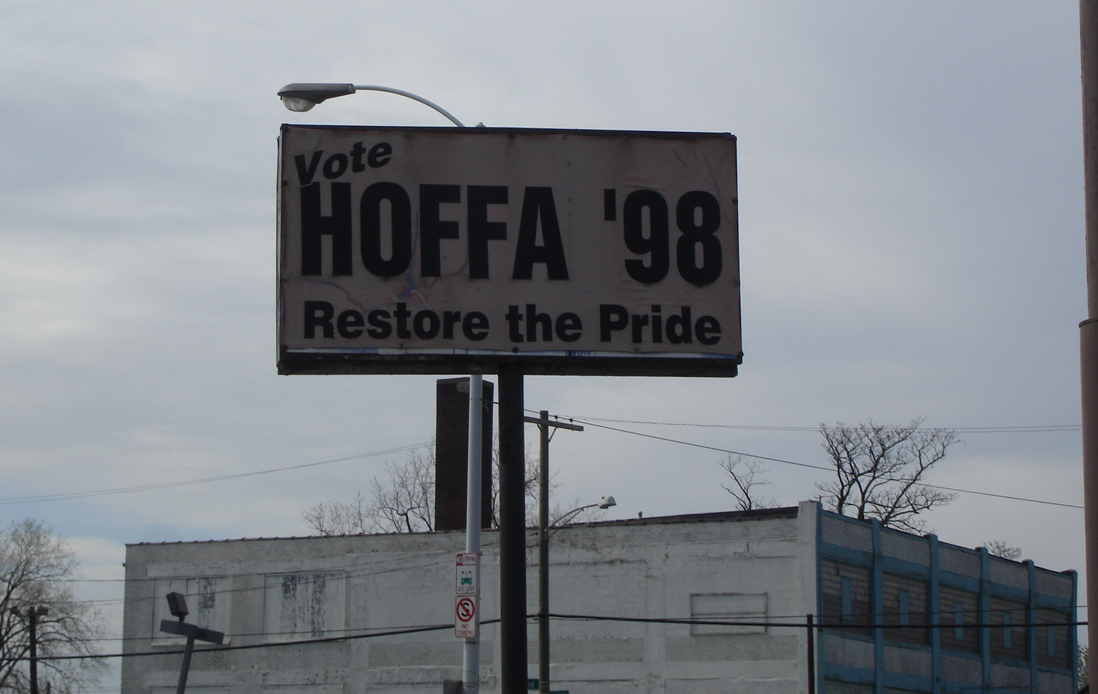
A billboard in Detroit supporting Hoffa in 1998 (still standing as of July 2006)

Frustrated with the AFL–CIO's lack of emphasis on organizing, the Teamsters Union and the Service Employees International Union (SEIU) split from the AFL–CIO on July 25, 2005. The group of breakaway unions, which later included the Laborer's, United Farm Workers and United Food and Commercial Workers Union, formed their own group called the Change to Win Federation. "We have been disappointed that over the last 10 years [the period of former AFL–CIO President John Sweeney's tenure] we have seen a decline in membership, a decline in density."

Hoffa further explained his union's decision to Fox News: "In our view, we must have more union members in order to change the political climate that is undermining workers' rights in this country. The AFL–CIO has chosen the opposite approach. We proposed that the AFL–CIO embark on a new course of action that would not only protect our existing Teamsters members and their families but lead to thousands of new working men and women to have the opportunity to organize into a strong union that would give them the chance to achieve the American dream to own their own home, send their kids to college and plan a strong retirement."

Hoffa, while pledging support of the AFL–CIO, said, "Today's decision means that we have chosen a course of growth and strength for the American labor movement based on organizing new members. ... This is just the beginning of a new era for America's workers."

Hoffa is an advocate of fair trade policies and a wide range of legislation. He also composed a weblog essay on the Huffington Post attacking Whole Foods for undermining efforts to win Congressional reform. Hoffa also spoke on the Thom Hartmann radio program about the politics of health care reform.

== See also ==
- Sean O'Brien (labor leader)
- Jackie Presser
- Roy Lee Williams
- Frank Fitzsimmons
- Dave Beck
- Cornelius Shea
- William J. McCarthy

Trade union offices
Preceded by Ron Carey	President of Teamsters Union (IBT); 1998–2022	Succeeded by Sean O'Brien
Preceded by Tony Sheldon	Chair of the Road Transport Section of the International Transport Workers' Federation; 2018–2022	Succeeded by Flemming Overgaard
