= Jackie Presser =

American labor leader (1926–1988)

- Born: August 6, 1926; Cleveland, Ohio, U.S.
- Died: July 9, 1988 (aged 61); Cleveland, Ohio, U.S.
- Occupation: Union leader
- Spouses: Pauline Walls (m. 1947; div. 1949) Elaine Goeble (m. 1949; div. 1952) Patricia (m. 1952; div. 1971) Carmen De La Portilla (m. 1971; div. 1985) Cindy Jarabek (m. 1986)
- Children: 2
- Father: Bill Presser

Jackie Presser (August 6, 1926 – July 9, 1988) was an American labor leader and president of the International Brotherhood of Teamsters from 1983 until his death in 1988. He was closely connected to organized crime, and allegedly became president of the Teamsters based on the approval and support of the Cleveland crime family. From 1972 until his death, he was also an informant for the Federal Bureau of Investigation concerning Mafia influence in the Teamsters union.

Jackie Presser

== Early life ==
Presser was born in Cleveland, Ohio, in 1926. His grandfather, a Jewish emigrant from Austria, became a garment worker, and was active in and participated in several strikes led by various garment makers' unions in New York City. Presser's father, William (Bill) Presser, was at the time of Jackie's birth a Teamster organizer. The Pressers were very poor: Bill Presser stuffed newspapers into shoes to block holes in the uppers and strengthen worn-out soles. The family often moved into an apartment at the beginning of the month and out again at the end of the month because the Pressers could not afford the rent.

Bill Presser was however a protege of Jimmy Hoffa and quickly rose within the local, regional and international Teamsters ranks. He was elected president of the Ohio Conference of Teamsters and eventually a vice president of the international union. Bill Presser was also intimately connected with the Cleveland mob.

Presser's childhood, by his own account, was a happy one. However, he was deeply influenced by his family's poverty and the anti-semitic prejudice he often encountered.

Presser dropped out of school in the middle of the eighth grade. Using his father's connections, he got a job delivering jukeboxes to local restaurants and bars.

Presser enlisted in the United States Navy in 1943 when he was 17, and served in World War II. After the war, Presser returned to Cleveland and got a job as a truck driver for a vending machine company.

After a year as a truck driver, Presser was hired as a union organizer by Local 10, a Cleveland affiliate of the Hotel Employees and Restaurant Employees Union. In 1948, Presser was elected president of Local 10. He merged his local with four other local unions in order to improve the workers' collective bargaining position. He also began receiving a markedly larger salary, and spending large amounts of money on travel and automobiles. He wore pinky rings and diamond bracelets, and became notorious for wearing loud, brightly colored sports jackets. He also began to gain substantial amounts of weight, a health problem he would fight for the rest of his life. In 1952, Presser lost re-election as union president after members became dissatisfied with his colorful and lavish lifestyle.

== Early Teamsters career ==
In 1952, Jackie Presser was hired as an organizer by the international Teamsters union and held a series of staff jobs for the next 12 years. Presser's break came in 1964, when he and his father brokered a real estate deal in suburban Cleveland for a group of local investors (which included himself). The investors built an upscale sports club and restaurant on the property secured by a $1.1 million loan from the Teamsters' Central States Pension Fund. The project went bankrupt, however, and the pension fund lost more than $265,000.

Presser also undertook a personal transformation at this time. He stopped wearing flashy rings and loud clothing and began expressing a taste for expensive, conservative, tailored suits. He also undertook a series of diets in an unsuccessful attempt to lose weight (he weighed close to 140 kg [300 pounds] for the rest of his life).

In 1966, Bill Presser gave his son Jackie a charter to form a new Teamsters local in Cleveland. Jackie Presser organized 12 workers at a local paint company and established Local 507. Presser hired a number of organizers, and Local 507 quickly organized 6,000 workers in dozens of plants and warehouses in the Cleveland area -— making Local 507 the largest Teamster local in the metropolitan area.

Bill and Jackie Presser were soon some of the most powerful men in the Teamsters union. By 1972, the father-son combination led the Ohio Conference of Teamsters. Jackie Presser quickly helped make the Ohio Conference a model within the Teamsters for providing social services, engaging in union-member communications, and undertaking effective political activity. Both Pressers were also trustees of the Teamster's Central States Pension Fund, one of the richest and most influential pension plans in the nation.

Jackie Presser was elected an international vice president of the Teamsters in 1976. His father was forced to resign his vice presidency after he was convicted of extortion and obstruction of justice. According to court testimony, Bill Presser and the Cleveland mob agreed to nominate Jackie as Bill's successor. Bill met with Roy Lee Williams, then president of the Central Conference of Teamsters, a regional council which controlled union locals in 14 Midwestern states, including Ohio. Williams, who was working with the Kansas City crime family, agreed to help Presser convince Teamster President Fitzsimmons to make Jackie a vice president. Jackie Presser's subsequent election was unanimous.

As an international vice president, Presser urged the Teamsters to root out corruption and pushed for a massive public relations campaign to improve the union's image. In 1977, the Teamsters built a large public relations operation at its headquarters in Washington, D.C. Presser soon won authorization for a $250,000-a-year advertising campaign, and the union began sponsoring football games on the radio.

However, that same year, Presser, Fitzsimmons, and 17 other Teamster leaders were forced to resign as trustees of the Central States Pension Fund. The Department of Justice had charged Presser and others with making improper loans to mob-controlled Las Vegas casinos, racetracks and real estate investments. In 1978, Presser was named a defendant in a civil suit brought by the U.S. Department of Labor (DOL), which sought damages and reimbursement on behalf of union retirees.

By 1979, Presser was making $231,676 a year. He drew a salary as both secretary-treasurer of Local 507 and as an international vice president of the union.

=== Becoming an FBI informant ===
Jackie Presser, along with his father and Teamsters President Frank Fitzsimmons, became informers for the federal government in 1972. Bill Presser had been indicted by the federal government on charges of bribery, embezzlement and other charges. Jimmy Hoffa, meanwhile, had been released from federal prison and was seeking to regain the presidency of the Teamsters. The three men offered the Internal Revenue Service (IRS) incriminating evidence about Hoffa and other rivals in the Teamsters union. The Pressers agreed to supply their evidence if the U.S. Department of Justice (DOJ) would drop its indictment against the senior Presser. Unbeknownst to Fitzsimmons, the Pressers told the IRS that they had evidence of illegal activities by Fitzsimmons as well. The IRS was not receptive to the offers, and DOJ refused to drop its indictment of Bill Presser (some charges were eventually dropped, and Bill Presser was found innocent of others). Angry at the government's refusal, Fitzsimmons allegedly contacted White House chief counsel Charles Colson (who was the Nixon administration's liaison to labor groups) and sought a meeting with President Richard Nixon. Embarrassed, IRS and Federal Bureau of Investigation (FBI) agents subsequently interviewed Jackie Presser in late 1972. Presser's information was verified, and Presser spent the rest of his life as an FBI informer.

Presser began receiving $2,500 a month (roughly $12,500 in 2007 dollars) from the FBI for providing information. Presser was considered a "top-echelon informant", marking him as one of the Bureau's most prized sources.

Shortly thereafter, Presser allegedly received permission from two FBI agents to pad the Local 507 payroll with fake employees. The individuals hired as "ghost employees" were not required to do any work but nevertheless received substantial paychecks. The paychecks, it was later claimed, were a way of funneling payments to Teamsters officials and members of the Cleveland mob.

=== Involvement with the Mafia ===
According to court records, in 1974 Jackie Presser became deeply involved in Mafia affairs. He allegedly told the leaders of the Chicago crime family that he was willing to do them favors in exchange for money and assistance. Jimmy "The Weasel" Fratianno, a former hitman in the Cleveland crime family and later acting head of the Los Angeles crime family, later testified that Chicago crime boss Joseph Aiuppa told him in 1974 that "if you need anything from Jackie Presser, he said he'll do it for you." Fratianno also testified that he colluded with Presser to set up a union dental program whose profits were skimmed into the bank accounts of Presser and the Mafia.

Organizationally, however, Presser was under the control of the Cleveland crime family.

Presser's involvement with organized crime eventually led to fears for his safety. In 1976, a battle for control inside the Cleveland mafia broke out. Longtime Cleveland mob boss John T. Scalish died without naming a successor. John Nardi, a high-ranking Teamster leader, formed a coalition with mobster Danny Greene to seize control of the Cleveland crime family. They were opposed by Scalish lieutenant James "Blackie" Licavoli. Eventually Nardi and Greene were murdered by Licavoli, along with several other Teamsters officials. Presser feared he was next. The FBI gave Presser a small radio transmitter that supposedly could detonate a car bomb from a distance. Presser also hired a large contingent of muscular bodyguards who accompanied him everywhere he went (including Teamster meetings). Despite being armed with the radio device and surrounded by guards, Presser fled to Florida and moved from hotel to hotel every few days until the gang war ended.

In 1977, Presser allegedly used his mob connections to seek political favors from President Jimmy Carter. According to Fratianno's court testimony, Presser asked Fratianno to locate someone who could persuade Carter to put pressure on DOJ, DOL and the FBI in criminal investigations or to secure pardons for Presser associates. Fratianno claimed that William Marchiondo, an Albuquerque lawyer, later met with Presser. Marchiondo was an associate of former New Mexico Governor Jerry Apodaca, and Fratianno believed that Marchiondo and Apodaca felt they had Carter's ear because they had supported the president's candidacy early in the 1976 primary season.

== Reagan transition controversy ==
In 1980, Ronald Reagan forged a close political relationship with Jackie Presser. During Reagan's 1980 campaign for president, Jackie Presser served as one of Reagan's hosts at a private luncheon for Teamster and other union leaders and escorted Reagan to private meetings with Teamster officials. After the November 1980 presidential election, Reagan named Presser as a labor advisor to his transition team. The media soon reported that Presser was reputed to have links to organized crime and that he was the object of a DOL civil suit for financial malfeasance. Reagan and his advisors claimed to have been unaware of the accusations, and Presser denied having any ties to organized crime. Just days after the story broke in the national press, however, New Jersey State Police witnesses testified that Presser was the primary contact for the DeCavalcante crime family of New Jersey and the Patriarca crime family of Boston whenever crime figures needed loans from Teamster pension funds. The courtroom testimony intensified the pressure on the Reagan transition team.

Democrats and leaders of the Teamsters for a Democratic Union (TDU), a Teamster reform group, demanded that Reagan remove Presser from the transition team. However, Reagan aides said that the transition team had completed its task and the issue was moot.

== Teamsters career, 1980-1983 ==
The U.S. Department of Labor began investigating Presser in 1981 after receiving allegations he had padded the Local 507 payroll with "ghost employees". A secret affidavit outlining the government's actions and preliminary findings was filed with a federal court in 1982.

On April 15, 1981, Frank Fitzsimmons announced he was stepping down as president of the Teamsters due to worsening health. Roy Williams and Jackie Presser were mentioned as possible successors, and some press reports indicated a fight for the presidency was under way. However, Presser announced he would not be a candidate and that he was supporting Williams instead. Williams was opposed by Pete Camarata—a dock worker from Detroit, Michigan who was the co-founder of the Teamsters for a Democratic Union (TDU). When TDU activists picketed the Teamster convention at which Williams was elected, Presser declared the picketers "an ever-changing cast of union drop-outs, college students, aimless transients and an elite group of zealots who clearly have the clout over the sign carriers" and declared them to be under the control of "Marxist leaders from the International Socialist Party." He also repeatedly referred to Camarata as "Commie-Rat-A". Camarata accused Presser of hiring a "squad of thugs" to intimidate delegates and provoke violence—allegations which would later prove accurate.

During the convention, Presser was asked whether he supported the reaffiliation of the union with the AFL-CIO. He told the press that his attitude was "very negative" toward reaffiliation.

In mid-June, Bill Presser died of a heart attack.

Jackie Presser, who was re-elected as an international vice president at the June convention, later reported that he earned $353,737 in 1981 from his various Teamsters jobs. In 1982, he made $394,895.

=== First official confirmation as government informant ===
Although turncoat mob leaders and others had long accused Jackie Presser of being a government informant, the first official confirmation did not come until August 22, 1981. In its August 31 issue, Time magazine reported that Fitzsimmons, Bill Presser and Jackie Presser had all served as government informants in the early 1970s to avoid possible prosecution. The information was revealed in declassified reports filed by IRS agents. Presser confirmed that he, his father and Fitzsimmons had met with federal agents, but declared that there had been only one meeting in 1972.

Days later, the Cleveland Plain Dealer newspaper reported that court documents and unidentified law enforcement officials had confirmed that Presser and his father had served as government informants while taking $300,000 in kickbacks from a Las Vegas public relations firm connected to organized crime. Presser categorically denied the report.

Soon after, however, editors at the Plain Dealer retracted the story despite protests from reporters. The mafia had long doubted claims that Presser was an informant, and the retraction helped renew mob confidence in Presser. The mob's confidence in Presser was reaffirmed a year later when the Justice Department publicly ended its investigation into the alleged kickback scheme.

== Bid for presidency ==
In February 1983, Presser was re-elected to the international union's policy committee.

Just two months later, Roy Williams was convicted for conspiring to bribe U.S. Senator Howard Cannon. Williams announced he would resign as Teamsters president while appealing his conviction.

Williams' conviction was no surprise to Presser. Beginning in 1979, Presser began providing the Justice Department with extensive information on Williams. It was Presser who had turned over the critical evidence which showed Williams had arranged to give Sen. Cannon a parcel of land as a bribe to defeat trucking deregulation legislation.

Press reports at the time claimed that a ferocious fight erupted over Williams' successor. Williams' resignation came just 15 days before the Teamster convention, at which a successor would have to be elected. In addition to Presser, candidates for the presidency were reported to be M.E. "Andy" Anderson, president of the statewide Teamsters organization in California; Joseph Morgan, president of the Teamsters in Florida; Don Peters, president of the large Teamsters local in Chicago; and Ray Schoessling, secretary-treasurer of the international Teamsters union and a Williams appointee. The press reported that Presser had formed an alliance with Anderson, which gave him enough votes to win the presidency.

In fact, no internal fight existed. Instead, mafia families in Chicago, Cleveland and various cities on the East Coast had met shortly after Williams' resignation announcement and picked Presser to lead the Teamsters. Initially, organized crime figures did not prefer Presser. But mob leaders Angelo Lonardo, Anthony "Fat Tony" Salerno, and Milton "Maishe" Rockman (Scalish's brother-in-law) met with mafia officials throughout the country to build support for a Presser presidency. The final decision was made at a meeting in a Chicago hotel attended by Jackie Cerone, Aiuppa, Lonardo and Rockman. Presser himself informed the FBI shortly after the mob meeting that he "had the support of all the East Coast families" and that he would be the next Teamsters' president.

Jackie Presser was elected president of the Teamsters on April 21, 1983. He pledged to re-invigorate the union, organize new members, and end trucking deregulation. He also said he had no opinion as to whether the Teamsters should rejoin the AFL-CIO.

Shortly after his election, Presser told his FBI contacts that anyone who sought to do business with him needed to go through the mafia first.

Presser's biggest opponent within the Teamsters was William J. McCarthy, president of Joint Council 10, which covered all Teamster locals in New England. In an attempt to discredit McCarthy, Presser told the FBI that McCarthy had sought the support of organized crime in an unsuccessful attempt to persuade Presser to appoint him secretary-treasurer in 1983.

Reports later showed that Presser was paid more than a half million dollars in salary in 1983 (the year of his election to the presidency). He received $216,000 as secretary-treasurer and executive officer of Local 507, $42,500 as vice chairman of the Ohio Conference of Teamsters, and $59,500 as president of Teamsters Joint Council 41 in Ohio. His presidential salary was $216,000 a year.

== Major presidential milestones ==
On May 5, 1983, the U.S. Department of Labor settled a portion of its case against the former trustees of the Central States Pension Fund. Several insurance companies agreed to pay more than $6.75 million to the fund. Presser was not involved in the settlement, and the civil suit against him continued. But the same day DOL claimed victory against pension fund graft, Presser told FBI agents that organized crime still controlled the pension fund. In 1984, Presser and the remaining trustees settled their personal liability suit for $2 million.

Three years later, the U.S. Department of Labor settled its final civil case against Presser and the other Central States Pension Fund trustees. The agreement, which included Presser, turned operation of the pension fund over to a federal court until the year 2007. In addition, Presser and the other 17 trustees paid an additional $175,000 to reimburse the fund for certain other costs. It was the first time the Labor Department won restitution from individual pension fund trustees under the Employee Retirement Income Security Act (ERISA).

Presser quickly established his control over the Teamsters during his first six months in office. He appointed Robert Holmes, a Detroit Teamster leader, as director of the Central Conference of Teamsters; Paul Locigno, a Teamster staffer from Ohio, as director of government affairs; Wallace Clements, a staff political coordinator in the Deep South, as political director; and Vicki Saporta, a longtime organizer, as organizing director. Presser also strengthened the union's research and lobbying shops and established the Titan System, a computer networking system which established email communication throughout the union for the first time. He also began a major lobbying effort, particularly against a proposed labor racketeering bill.

In October 1983, the TDU announced a slate of candidates to try to oust Presser.

On November 8, 1983, Presser underwent triple bypass heart surgery in Cleveland.

By the end of 1983, Presser was making $755,474 a year.

On October 24, 1984, Presser named Weldon Mathis secretary-treasurer of the Teamsters. Mathis replaced Ray Schoessling, who retired effective January 1, 1986.

In 1984, Presser received more than $530,000 in pay. Presser was paid $224,000 in salary by Local 507, $59,500 by Teamsters Joint Council 41, $18,100 by the Ohio Conference of Teamsters, and $229,000 by the international union.

In April 1986, as Presser's legal woes worsened, C. Sam Theodus, leader of Teamster Local 407 in Cleveland, announced he would run as the TDU candidate against Presser. Presser's legal problems, however, seemed unlikely to harm his chances for re-election.

At the regularly scheduled Teamsters convention in May 1986, Presser was elected to a full five-year term as Teamsters president. Presser arrived in the ballroom accompanied by composer Aaron Copland's Fanfare for the Common Man, four muscular men dressed as Roman centurions bearing him on a golden sedan chair. Despite being indicted days before on embezzlement and racketeering charges, Presser received 1,729 votes to Theodus' 24 votes. Theodus conceded after the first hour of balloting, but Presser ordered the roll call to continue to the end (it lasted another three-and-a-half hours) to humiliate Theodus. After the balloting, delegates defeated proposals to cut the president's salary by $100,000 and to prohibit national leaders from collecting multiple union salaries.

A month later, the press reported that Presser had received a total income of $588,353 from his four union positions.

In October 1987, Presser led the Teamsters back into the AFL-CIO. Presser had repeatedly said he was uninterested in reaffiliation, and AFL-CIO President Lane Kirkland had been deeply angered by Presser's attempt to merge with the ITU and to raid AFL-CIO affiliated unions with members in the publishing industry. But as Presser's legal problems mounted and a federal takeover of the union appeared more and more likely, Presser sought reaffiliation as a means of shielding the Teamsters from the government. In August and September 1987, leaders of the AFL-CIO and the Teamsters secretly worked out a tentative reaffiliation agreement—exactly 30 years after the Teamsters were first expelled for corruption. Pushing reaffiliation on the AFL-CIO side were Robert Georgine, president of the Building and Construction Trades Department, AFL-CIO, and William H. Wynn, president of the United Food and Commercial Workers. Law enforcement officials said the reaffiliation undercut their effort to put the Teamsters under federal control.

=== Attempted merger with ITU ===
A month after his election, Presser proposed a merger of the Teamsters and the International Typographical Union (ITU), a 70,000-member printers' union. AFL-CIO President Lane Kirkland, however, opposed the merger because the Teamsters were not members of the labor federation. The Teamsters and Typographers went ahead with their merger talks anyway, even as Kirkland supported an ITU group opposed to the merger. After nearly a year, merger seemed imminent despite a lawsuit by a small group of ITU members opposing the merger. But in the election for ITU officers held just days prior to the merger vote, the incumbent ITU president Joe Bingel and executive council leadership was ousted from office and an anti-merger slate elected. The merger referendum did not pass.

Presser continued to push merger with the Typographers, even as the new ITU president Robert Mc Michen and executive council leadership signed a merger agreement with the Graphic Communications International Union (GCIU). That effort collapsed in March 1985 after ITU members rejected merger with the GCIU. Again Presser reached a merger agreement with the ITU, and once more Kirkland went on the offensive against the merger. But in August 1985, ITU members once more rejected merger with the Teamsters.

In July 1986, the ITU finally agreed to a merger with the Communications Workers of America. That merger was approved in November 1986, ending Presser's attempt to woo the ITU. The ITU ceased to exist. The printer locals joined the CWA and the mailer locals joined the IBT.

=== Second Reagan endorsement ===
The Teamsters had endorsed Ronald Reagan for president in 1980, creating a furor within the American labor movement. However, AFL-CIO officials expressed hope that the Teamsters would endorse the Democratic candidate in 1984. This hope proved wrong.

Presser announced on June 7, 1983 that he intended to endorse Reagan for re-election. A formal endorsement did not come in January 1984 as expected, and Presser strongly criticized the AFL-CIO for endorsing Democratic candidate Walter Mondale too early in the primary cycle.

Worried Republicans waited throughout the spring and summer for a Teamster endorsement, but it was not forthcoming. In early August, Presser finally told White House aides that Teamster support for Reagan hinged on whether Reagan would remove Donald L. Dotson as chairman of the National Labor Relations Board. The Dotson-led labor board had issued a string of decisions which the Teamsters considered anti-labor. On the eve of the Republican National Convention, Presser told the press that Dotson's removal was a "do-or-die situation" for the Teamsters, which held more NLRB-supervised organizing elections than any other union. Reagan refused to fire Dotson, although presidential aides said that a compromise would be reached over the NLRB's actions.

Just a week later, the Teamsters endorsed Reagan. Vice President George H. W. Bush accepted the endorsement in person. The Teamster endorsement was the only large labor union endorsement Reagan received. In apparent gratitude, Reagan named Presser to the second Reagan transition team as a labor advisor.

=== Collective bargaining achievements ===
Trucking: Deregulation had led to intense competition in the trucking industry, and many union trucking firms were nearing bankruptcy or were in financial difficulty. In January 1983, the employer organization which governed collective bargaining activities in the trucking industry asked the Teamsters to re-open its contract and approve significant wage reductions. Presser agreed to do both, so long as laid-off union members were given preference in re-hiring. The employers agreed. The agreement was announced on August 16, 1983. But in a surprise vote, Teamster members rejected the new wage agreement 94,086 to 13,082—easily reaching the two-thirds majority necessarily to reject a contract under the Teamster constitution. The results were a serious blow to Presser's prestige and power in the union.

Trucking industry talks began again in January 1985. Presser pushed for limits on the use of non-union subcontractors and subsidiaries, as well as wage and pension increases. Employers pushed for the establishment of a two-tier wage scale that would set permanently lower salaries for new drivers.

Negotiators reached a new contract on April 1, 1985, as the old agreement expired. Teamsters officials initially claimed the settlement retained a single wage scale. In fact the agreement created a two-tier pay system, with new workers receiving wages 30 percent lower than incumbent drivers. The agreement also eliminated cost-of-living increases and significantly lower wages for temporary workers. The total wage and benefit package provided an increase of 10 percent over three years, the lowest increase since a national agreement had first been established in 1964. Presser and other Teamster leaders were forced to lobby hard for passage of the agreement. After a month-long ratification battle, Teamsters members narrowly ratified the contract by a 53.2 percent majority.

A third trucking industry contract was settled in May 1988. By this time, however, Presser was too ill to participate actively in any of the negotiating sessions. The new collective bargaining agreement was reached on March 30, 1988. Teamster members cast 63.5 percent of all ballots against the pact. But since the "no" vote did not meet the two-thirds majority required to overturn a contract and authorize a strike, Presser ordered national union officials to impose the pact.

Package delivery: The Teamsters' contract with United Parcel Service (UPS) expired on June 1, 1985. Presser sought a two-year replacement agreement that would provide a wage increase. Presser opened contract talks nearly a year early, and won a moderate wage increase. But four Teamster members sued to prevent a vote on the contract, arguing Presser had given members no time to study or debate the proposal. A federal judge agreed and impounded the ballots on September 19. Undeterred, Presser once more lobbied hard for the a new contract. A second vote was held, and 70 percent of voters approved the pact.

In 1987, Presser renegotiated the 1985 contract. This time, negotiations opened late and a new agreement not reached until two weeks after expiration of the existing pact. The tentative agreement provided a minor wage increase—only 30 cents an hour. A majority of UPS members voted against the collective bargaining agreement (35,036 for approval, 36,093 against). But since the vote fell far short of the two-thirds necessary to reject a contract, the agreement was ratified and imposed on angry workers.

Carhaul: Shortly after ratification of the UPS pact, Presser began negotiations on behalf of Teamster truck drivers who deliver new automobiles to dealerships (carhaulers). The carhaul contract expired on June 1, 1985. Presser negotiated a new agreement in mid-June which provided for a minimal wage increase of 60 cents an hour, imposed a two-tier wage system, reduced pay for trips of more than 1,100 miles, eliminated cost-of-living adjustments, and provided for only half-pay for loaded return trips. The union's 21,000 carhaul drivers and support personnel rejected the contract by a 4-to-1 majority. Although no strike was planned, the union was forced to strike on July 26, 1985, after employers sought additional wage and benefit concessions during the subsequent round of negotiations. After a 19-day strike, a new contract was tentatively approved which offered the same wage increase. However, management agreed to remove the half-pay loaded return trip proposal. The two-tier wage system was retained, but the wage difference between incumbents and new hires was dramatically reduced. The employers also agreed to let members vote on any concessionary economic proposals during the life of the contract (under the previous agreement, only Teamster leadership voted on these changes), and were able to make permanent a temporary provision allowing companies to divert freight from terminals where there have been layoffs. But the pact's initial rejection and the snap strike were both seen as blows to Presser's leadership.

=== Commission on Organized Crime ===
In early 1985, the President's Commission on Organized Crime issued a sealed subpoena ordering Presser to testify about mafia influence in the Teamsters union. Presser filed suit to have the subpoena thrown out. In March, a federal court refused to bar the subpoena.

The Commission held its April 1985 hearings in Chicago, and focused those sessions on organized crime involvement in labor unions. During the hearings, Commission members charged that the mafia controlled the Teamsters, the Laborers, HERE and the International Longshoremen's Association. Former mobsters described numerous syndicate cash bribes and other payments to Presser. Other witnesses testified that Presser had given his approval to the Brotherhood of Loyal Americans and Strong Teamsters (BLAST), a group set up to intimidate TDU members. Testimony before the panel indicated that Presser ordered BLAST members—including regional and local Teamster leaders and staff—to disrupt TDU meetings during the 1983 Teamster national convention. BLAST members drove speakers from podiums, tore down banners, seized and threw away literature, beat TDU members and ejected them from the convention hall. "We should be doing more of that. I'm going to tell you, I'm not going to let up on these people," one witness quoted Presser.

During his own testimony, Presser invoked his Fifth Amendment right against self-incrimination 15 times.

Presser's silence angered the Commission's members. In October 1985, the Commission renewed its efforts to question Presser after it was revealed that the Department of Justice had decided not to prosecute him for padding the payroll at Local 507.

In the fall of 1985, the Commission heard testimony from former Teamsters president Roy Williams about Presser's connections to organized crime. Under a grant of immunity, Williams testified extensively about Presser's offer to fix a 1974 criminal case for $10,000 and his desire to obtain kickbacks for helping to arrange a 1975 Teamsters pension fund loan to organized crime figures so they could purchase a Las Vegas casino.

In March 1986, the Commission released a preliminary report on organized crime influence in the Teamsters. The Commission found corruption "so pervasive" that it recommended that the federal government seek court supervision of the union. Department of Justice lawyers immediately began preparing a civil lawsuit to place the Teamsters under federal control.

Presser vigorously opposed the Justice Department's efforts. He planned a five-year legal, public relations, legislative and political counter-attack to keep the Teamsters free from court supervision, and sought and won AFL-CIO support for his proposals. He also led a massive lobbying effort in Congress to oppose the takeover on fiscal and libertarian philosophical grounds designed to appeal to Republicans.

In May 1988, federal prosecutors cut back their effort to take over the Teamsters after losing a criminal trial against Anthony "Fat Tony" Salerno. Salerno and others had been accused of labor racketeering and controlling the election of Roy Williams and Jackie Presser as Teamsters president. The failure to convict Salerno led prosecutors to believe that their case against the union might be weaker than they thought. Nevertheless, an immediate trusteeship was sought to eliminate mob influence in the union.

== Final indictment and death ==
The 1981 investigation into Presser's payroll-padding at Local 507 finally led to a decision by the U.S. Department of Justice to prosecute Presser in June 1984. Five days later, the Los Angeles Times named Presser as a U.S. government criminal informant. The report quoted unnamed FBI sources, making this the first time that government officials had confirmed the unverified accusations of mob informants and other reports.

But nearly a year passed before any prosecutorial action was taken. During this time, the Justice Department debated whether to protect Presser as a source or prosecute him. Finally, on May 16, 1985, top Justice Department officials ordered federal attorneys to drop their prosecution of Presser over concerns that his extensive cooperation with the government would be revealed.

Outraged members of Congress demanded an investigation into the handling of the politically sensitive case. Over the next year, Senate investigators learned that FBI field agents had not kept FBI officials fully informed of their actions, that FBI field agents may have improperly approved illegal actions, and that FBI officials did not keep DOJ and DOL officials fully informed of their relationship with Presser.

Presser's attorneys claimed that the FBI had given him permission to initiate and maintain the payroll-padding scheme as a means of shielding him from mob suspicions. Such permission, which is permitted under FBI and DOJ rules and federal law, should bar prosecution, Presser's lawyers argued.

Federal grand juries in Cleveland and Washington, D.C., soon opened investigations into the FBI's handling of the Presser case as well as whether the promises made by FBI agents had been authorized. Justice Department leaders eventually undertook a prosecution of one of the FBI field agents who handled Presser, claiming that he had not been authorized to give Presser permission to engage in the payroll-padding scheme.

In May 1986, federal prosecutors again indicted Jackie Presser for fraud.

Presser's declining health caused numerous delays in his trial. He had surgery to remove two cancerous tumors in January 1987. His cancer returned in June 1987, and he spent several months undergoing chemotherapy and recuperating. He underwent surgery again in the fall of 1987 to remove another cancerous tumor. He suffered additional heart and pituitary gland problems throughout the winter and spring of 1988.

On May 4, 1988, Jackie Presser told the Teamsters executive board that he was taking a four-month leave of absence due to his health problems. Weldon Mathis was named the union's acting president.

Presser was diagnosed with a brain tumor 10 days later, and underwent surgery to have the tumor removed. Presser went home, but was re-admitted to the hospital on June 27 suffering from cardiac problems, a blood clot in his lung and pituitary gland dysfunction.

Jackie Presser died in Cleveland on the evening of Saturday, July 9, 1988. He was four weeks shy of his 62nd birthday. The proximate cause of death was cardiac arrest, a complication of his cancer and ongoing cardiac problems.

Hours after Presser's funeral on July 12, Teamster leaders met at a nearby restaurant and agreed to support William J. McCarthy as his successor.

== Other interests, personal life ==
Presser and his first wife Pat had two children, a daughter Bari (born 1953) and a son, Gary. Presser divorced his second wife, Carmen, in 1983. The couple had two children. Presser's son, Gary, was elected vice president of Local 507.

Presser was an avid golfer. He also enjoyed fine food and patronized five-star restaurants.

Presser was the first labor leader to be named to the Greater Cleveland Growth Association board of directors (the city's chamber of commerce). He also worked with the Special Olympics and organized tournaments for blind golfers.

== Cultural references ==
A 1992 made-for-TV movie was produced for HBO about his time in office, called Teamster Boss: The Jackie Presser Story, which starred Brian Dennehy and Jeff Daniels.

== Notes ==
Trade union offices
Preceded by Roy Williams	President of the International Brotherhood of Teamsters; April 14, 1983 – May 5, 1988	Succeeded by Weldon Mathis (interim)
