= Sandy Pope =

American trade unionist (born 1956)

Alexandra 'Sandy' Pope (born 1956) is an American trade unionist. She was a truck driver and worked in warehouses before being elected President of International Brotherhood of Teamsters Local 805 in New York City. A resident of Astoria, Queens, she is a member of the reform caucus Teamsters for a Democratic Union. In 2011, Pope challenged incumbent IBT President James P. Hoffa. She was the first woman to run for president of the Teamsters, an international union with 1.3 million members at the time.
