= Weldon Mathis =

American labor leader (1926–2001)

Weldon Lamar Mathis (April 2, 1926 – October 20, 2001) was an American labor leader. He was secretary-treasurer of the Teamsters from 1985 to 1991. After Teamsters president Jackie Presser took a leave of absence for health reasons, Mathis was interim president from May 5, 1988, to July 18, 1988. He was defeated for the presidency in an executive council vote, and served out the rest of his term as secretary-treasurer before retiring.

== Early career ==
Weldon Mathis was born in Sylvester, Georgia, in 1926. He served in the United States Army in World War II.

Mathis joined the Teamsters in 1946. Mathis's Teamster career began when he was elected business agent for Local 728 in Atlanta, Georgia, in 1950. He was elected the local's secretary-treasurer in 1953 and its president in 1956. He remained the local's president, even though he held additional national offices as well, until 1976.

In 1957, he was hired by the Teamsters' Southern Conference to be an organizer. He left that post in 1967 when he was hired as an organizer for the international union.

Mathis was appointed a vice president of the international union in 1972 to fill an empty seat. He was elected 1976 and re-elected in 1981.

In 1967, president Frank Fitzsimmons appointed Mathis as his executive assistant.

In 1978, Fitzsimmons appointed him director of the union's Building Material and Construction Department.

== Secretary-treasurer ==
In 1985, Mathis was elected secretary-treasurer of the Teamsters. In 1986, Presser won an amendment to the Teamsters' constitution so that the secretary-treasurer rather than the First Vice President would become interim president. Presser secretly consulted the Federal Bureau of Investigation about Mathis before making him secretary-treasurer. The FBI said he was not involved with organized crime.

Ten days after he was named interim president, Mathis resigned as president of Local 728. The United States Department of Labor was investigating him at the time due to allegations of vote fraud in his last re-election bid.

== Interim president ==
When Teamster president Jackie Presser was diagnosed with cancer and took a four-month leave of absence on May 5, 1988, Mathis was named interim president.

Presser was subsequently diagnosed with brain cancer, setting off a power struggle within the union. The members of the union's freight and warehouse and its air freight divisions voted overwhelmingly against their respective three-year national contracts after Mathis took over. But Mathis declared each contract "ratified" because the "no" vote fell short of the two-thirds needed to reject a contract and authorize a strike. The contract votes weakened Mathis's support on the union's executive board because Mathis was the highest-ranking official involved in the talks.

Mathis's support among the union's leadership was never strong. Mathis was considered much more liberal Presser or the rest of the Teamsters' leadership at the time, and he was much more in favor of participating fully in AFL-CIO.

Mathis was challenged by a faction of conservative Teamsters led by Joseph Trerotola, the union's First Vice President. Trerotola was deeply angered by the 1986 constitutional amendment which allowed Mathis to assume the presidency, and he began building a coalition to oust him. When Mathis called a meeting in Arizona (where Presser was being treated), Trerotola refused to attend. Initially, possible challengers included Joseph W. Morgan (who had sought to become interim president after Roy Lee Williams' resignation in 1983, Walter Shea (director of the Eastern Conference of Teamsters in Washington, D.C.), Donald Peters (a Teamster leader in Chicago), and Arnie Weinmeister (a Teamster official in Washington state and protégé of former interim president George Mock).

Mathis suffered another blow to his candidacy on June 28, 1988, when federal officials filed suit in federal court to impose a trusteeship on the Teamsters union..

Presser died on July 9, 1988, triggering an election for a new president.

But at an executive board meeting on July 18, 1988, Mathis was unseated as president in favor of William J. McCarthy, president of the New England Conference of Teamsters. McCarthy, a protégé of Jimmy Hoffa, emerged as a candidate days before the vote. He was seen as a much more aggressive leader than Mathis. McCarthy—who led the opposition to the freight and warehouse contract—promised to fight the government's trusteeship suit, adopt a more confrontational collective bargaining posture, end the union's thaw toward the rest of the AFL-CIO, and endorse a George H. W. Bush in the 1988 presidential election. Peters, Shea and Weinmeister pulled out of the running, throwing their support behind McCarthy. After a bitter, rancorous, two-and-a-half-hour board meeting, the board voted 9-to-8 to select McCarthy as the union's new president. Vice president Daniel Ligurotis of Chicago cast the deciding vote.

== Post-presidency ==
In late December 1988, the federal government sued to overturn Mathis's 1987 election as president of Local 728.

In March 1989, Mathis signed an agreement with the Department of Justice. He consented to aggressively seek internal reforms in the union in exchange for being dropped from the government's labor racketeering suit.

The Teamsters reached an agreement with the Justice Department on March 12, 1989, in which the union agreed to institute internal reforms in order to end corruption and improve the democratic nature of its elections.

Mathis was chosen by the executive board in 1990 to run for re-election as part of an incumbent slate. President McCarthy declined to run for health reasons, and the board selected R.V. Durham, an international vice president, to run as their candidate for president.

In February 1991, Mathis backed a decision by Durham to reject a McCarthy-backed candidate for an empty vice presidential seat. The move was seen as an attempt to put political distance between the Durham candidacy and the McCarthy administration, which was increasingly unpopular with Teamster members. In retaliation, the board sued McCarthy and Mathis for labor racketeering.

A week later, on February 8, 1991, Mathis recommended that the Teamster executive council look into the bidding process McCarthy used to award his son-in-law a contract to print the union magazine. Mathis's move was widely seen as a possible "coup attempt": If McCarthy were found to have committed improper acts, he would be forced to resign—allowing Mathis to become president of the union as well as be seen as a reformer. But the Teamster general board deadlocked 7–7 over the issue, and no investigation was made.

On April 10, 1991, Mathis withdrew from the race for the secretary-treasurer position. Durham replaced him with Walter Shea.

Shea attempted to oust McCarthy in June 1991, once more charging that McCarthy should step down immediately over the contract awarded to his son-in-law. A court-appointed administrator of the Teamsters had ruled that McCarthy had improperly awarded the printing contract but did not seek charges against him. A federal district court judge agreed with that decision. McCarthy turned the meeting of the Teamster executive board over to Mathis, who subsequently ruled that no vote could be taken until after the Teamster convention.

Mathis retired from his post as secretary-treasurer on October 31, 1991, two months early.

Mathis and his wife, the former Myrtle Henson, had five children. Two of Mathis's sons, who controlled Local 728, were voted out of office in a federally monitored election. Rather than return to Georgia, Mathis retired to Florida.

Weldon Mathis died of cancer on October 20, 2001, in Ormond Beach, Florida.

Trade union offices
Preceded by Raymond Schoessling	Secretary-Treasurer of the International Brotherhood of Teamsters; 1985–1991	Succeeded by Tom Sever
Preceded by Jackie Presser	President of Teamsters Union (IBT); May 5, 1988 – July 18, 1988; Interim	Succeeded by William J. McCarthy
