= William J. McCarthy =

William Joseph McCarthy
- Born: July 2, 1919; Boston, Massachusetts, U.S.
- Died: November 19, 1998 (aged 79); Arlington, Massachusetts, U.S.
- Occupation: Union leader
- Title: President of the International Brotherhood of Teamsters
- Spouse: Mary Joyce
- Children: 4

William J. McCarthy (July 2, 1919 – November 19, 1998) was an American labor leader and official in the Teamsters. He was appointed president of the Teamsters on July 18, 1988, defeating interim president Weldon Mathis. Although he began a re-election campaign in 1990, a new democratic election process and the rise of a reform movement within the union led him to withdraw and retire at the end of his term. He stepped down as president at the end of 1991 when his term of office ended.

== Life ==
McCarthy was born in Boston, Massachusetts in 1919. McCarthy learned to drive a big rig. In 1936, McCarthy stole a blank baptismal certificate and faked his birth date so he could qualify for a chauffeur's license. He joined Local 25, and worked for Benjamin Motor Express. McCarthy served in the United States Army during World War II.

=== Teamsters ===
In 1946, McCarthy was elected president of the 7,000-member local. McCarthy was elected an international vice president of the Teamsters in 1969. He was elected president of Joint Council 10, which oversaw all Teamsters locals in New England, in 1972. McCarthy ran for election for First Vice President, then the union's number-two position, in 1984. He lost. Union President Jackie Presser accused him of seeking the assistance of organized crime in his election bid. McCarthy denied the accusation, and the case was closed after no additional evidence was forthcoming.

In June 1988, union president Jackie Presser took a leave of absence due to ill health. Weldon Mathis, then the union's secretary-treasurer, was named his successor. Mathis enforced two union contracts even though the membership had not approved them by a majority vote. When Presser died in June 1988, McCarthy chose to challenge Mathis for the presidency. On July 18, 1988, after a contentious executive board meeting, McCarthy defeated Mathis 9-to-8.

In 1989, McCarthy negotiated an agreement which ended a United States Department of Justice lawsuit seeking trusteeship of the Teamsters union. McCarthy and the IBT executive board agreed to a consent decree with the formation of a government appointed independent review board with an aim of democratic internal reforms and to purge the union of corruption.

In 1990, McCarthy announced he would seek election for a full term as president. Ron Carey, a Teamster leader from New York City, challenged him for the presidency. McCarthy's political position in the union weakened, and he pulled out of the race in favor of R.V. Durham. He twice faced charges that he had improperly awarded a printing contract to a printing house owned by his son-in-law, once in February 1991 and again in June 1991. Each time, the union's executive board agreed to put off a vote, and McCarthy retained his office.

McCarthy lost a re-election as president of Local 25 to George W. Cashman in 1991. In 1992, McCarthy retired as president of Joint Council 10, which he had run for 20 years, and retired to his small brick house in Arlington, Massachusetts.

== Personal life ==
McCarthy and his wife Mary (née Joyce) had two daughters and two sons.

McCarthy died of complications from heart disease on November 19, 1998, in Arlington.

Trade union offices
Preceded by Weldon Mathis (interim)	President of the International Brotherhood of Teamsters; July 18, 1988 – February 1, 1992	Succeeded by Ron Carey
