= Pete Camarata =

American activist (1946–2014)

- Pete Camarata, who took a beating for his defiance, is pictured in 1978 under a portrait of the Teamsters leader Jimmy Hoffa.
- Born: September 7, 1946; Detroit, Michigan, U.S.
- Died: February 9, 2014 (aged 67); Chicago, Illinois
- Occupation: Labor movement activist/leader

Pete Camarata (born September 7, 1946, in Detroit, Michigan died February 9 2014.) was a Teamster labor activist and one of the founders of Teamsters for a Democratic Union a rank-and-file union democracy movement organizing to reform the International Brotherhood of Teamsters (IBT), or Teamsters.

== Early years ==
Camarata was born in Detroit, Michigan, the auto capital of the world. Pete was the son of a United Auto Workers organizer, Caspar Camarata who worked for Packard Motor Car Company.

== Teamster activism ==
At the young age of 29, Camarata was the solo TDU affiliated delegate to the 1976 Teamster convention, where he spoke out against the International Brotherhood of Teamsters leadership. He was later beaten unconscious for his opposition.

== Death ==
Camarata died of renal cancer at the age of 67 in Chicago, Illinois, on February 9, 2014.
