= Ron Carey (labor leader) =

American labor leader (1936–2008)

- Born: March 22, 1936; Queens, New York, U.S.
- Died: December 11, 2008 (aged 72); Queens, New York, U.S.
- Occupation: Union leader
- Title: Former President of the International Brotherhood of Teamsters
- Spouse: Barbara (Murphy) Carey
- Children: Ronald Carey, Jr., Sandra Perrone, Daniel Carey, Pamela Casabarro, Barbara Marchese
- Parent(s): Joseph and Loretta Carey

Ronald Robert Carey (March 22, 1936 – December 11, 2008) was an American labor leader who served as president of the International Brotherhood of Teamsters from 1991 to 1997. He was the first Teamster General President elected by a direct vote of the membership. He ran for re-election in 1996 and won, but in 1997 federal investigators discovered that the Carey campaign had engaged in an illegal donation kickback scheme to raise more than $700,000 for the 1996 re-election effort. His re-election was overturned, Carey was disqualified from running for Teamsters president again, and he was subsequently expelled from the union for life. Although a federal jury ultimately cleared him of all wrongdoing in the scandal, the lifetime ban remained in place until his death.

== Early life ==
Carey, the second of six children (all of them boys), was born in Long Island City in March 1936 to Joseph and Loretta Carey. His father was a driver for United Parcel Service (UPS). Carey's father had to work Sundays and Christmas Day (often without pay), which taught Ron about workplace injustice, but his father also took him to union meetings where Ron learned about workplace change and how to run a democratic union. Raised in Astoria and Long Island City, he graduated from Haaren High School in Manhattan and was offered entry into St. John's University on a swimming scholarship. But he turned down college, enlisting in the Marines in 1953 and serving until 1955. At the age of 18, he married Barbara Murphy, a girl who lived in the apartment above him. The Careys remained married until Ron's death; they had five children.

Carey became a UPS driver and joined the Teamsters in 1956. He and his father pooled their money and bought a home for both families in Kew Gardens, Queens. He ran for and was elected shop steward of the 7,000-member Local 804 in 1958 because he felt members weren't getting the services their dues paid for. He was elected secretary of the local in 1965. After several unsuccessful campaigns, Carey was elected Local 804 president in November 1967. He earned a reputation as a hard bargainer (by 1977, he had negotiated salary increases which doubled his members' 1968 hourly wages) and for being free from graft and the influence of organized crime. Under his leadership, in November 1967 Local 804 became one of the first Teamster locals whose members qualified for a pension after 25 years of employment regardless of age. He also led long but successful strikes in 1968, 1971, 1974, and 1982. He was re-elected eight times, winning each campaign by landslide margins. Although Local 804 had always negotiated its own contract with UPS, the national union forced the local to participate in the national master contract in 1979. Carey was named a negotiator for the national master contract, but was not included in the Teamsters' national bargaining team. In 1987, Carey sued to overturn a provision of the union's constitution which permitted rejection of a proposed contract only by a two-thirds majority. The union changed the provision to permit a majority to reject a proposed contract.

During his tenure as Local 804 president, Carey took two years of correspondence courses at home, two years of courses at the Xavier Institute for Labor Management Relations (a highly influential Catholic labor school), and six months of labor management courses at Cornell University.

Steven Brill devoted an entire chapter to Carey in his 1978 book, The Teamsters, which drew attention to the local leader and launched his national career within the Teamsters.

== The Road to the Teamster General Presidency ==
=== Election campaign ===
In 1989, Carey announced that he would run for president of the Teamsters union. Carey was highly critical of the UPS contract that the Teamsters, led by interim General President William J. McCarthy, had negotiated in 1990. Carey's local represented more than 6,600 members at UPS, making it largest Teamsters local within the company, and Carey's criticism of the contract carried great weight within the international union. Carey also criticized McCarthy for refusing to call for a strike vote prior to ratification, for not adequately communicating the "concessionary" nature of the contract to Teamster members, and for helping oversee the loss of nearly 800,000 Teamsters members in the past decade. In mid-October 1990, McCarthy, suffering from health problems and losing support within the union for his handling of various contract negotiations, announced he would not seek a full term as Teamsters president. Endorsed by Teamsters for a Democratic Union (TDU), a member-led reform caucus, Carey ran for General President on a pledge to eliminate corruption and organized crime's influence in the union. Utilizing TDU's national mailing list, he raised $200,000 in mostly small contributions from Teamsters members and criss-crossed the country by car to meet with the union's membership.

The December 1991 election was the first in which Teamsters members elected the General President by direct secret ballot rather than through delegates hand-picked by local leaders. Other candidates in the election included: R.V. Durham, leader of the Teamsters in North Carolina and generally considered the front-runner in the campaign (he had the backing of a majority of the union's executive board); Walter Shea, a veteran union staffer from Washington, D.C.; and Carey. Although James P. Hoffa, son of disappeared Teamsters president Jimmy Hoffa and a long-time Teamsters union attorney, tried to enter the race for president, a federal official ruled that he did not qualify under the union's eligibility rules. Carey and his slate (which included a candidate for secretary-treasurer and 13 vice presidencies) swept the election. Carey won with 48.5 percent of the vote to Durham's 33.2 percent and Shea's 18.3 percent. But turnout was low: Less than half the membership voted, and only 16 percent of the union's total membership voted for Carey. Carey vowed to reduce the general president's salary, end the practice of permitting union officers to draw multiple salaries, no longer endorse Republicans for president, and seek federal legislation mandating universal health care.

=== First term ===
Changes and challenges came quickly during Carey's first term. Within days of his inauguration as union president, he replaced a large number of top staff at the union's headquarters, and within a few weeks sold the union's two airplanes and started charging staff for lunches in the union cafeteria. He twice ordered his own salary cut, from $225,000 in 1991 to $175,000 in 1994. In his first few months in office, Carey defeated a disaffiliation attempt by flight attendants working for Northwest Airlines (and later refused to agree to a contract in which the Teamsters would win a 30 percent ownership stake in Northwest in return for $886 million in contract concessions), renegotiated a contract for truck drivers (carhaulers) who ferried automobiles from ports and factories to dealers, and defeated an attempt by the Safeway grocery store chain to contract out its trucking operations. Carey was also active politically. He was the first Teamsters president to testify widely in front of Congress. He vigorously opposed the North American Free Trade Agreement (NAFTA), and pledged political retaliation against members of Congress who did.

Despite Carey's pledge to eliminate corruption and the influence of organized crime in the Teamsters, there were many who claimed that he did little in his first term to tackle the problem. Federal investigators accused Carey of engaging in "halfhearted" reforms, permitting a Teamster with known organized crime links to oversee a corrupt local, hindering court-appointed trustees reforming locals, and setting up an ethical practices committee which did nothing to stop corruption. One organized crime figure, Alphonse "Little Al" D'Arco, former acting boss of the Lucchese crime family, even said he had had a relationship with Carey in the 1960s and 1970s—statements Carey vigorously denied. U.S. Department of Justice officials began an investigation into the accusations in June 1994. There were also claims that Carey had improperly intervened in a jurisdictional dispute between two Teamster locals. Carey was also accused of a conflict of interest for not disclosing that he had received UPS stock from his deceased father's estate. Joseph Carey bought eight shares of stock in 1935 for $320, which over the years (including stock splits) grew to 112,000 shares worth $1.9 million. The stock was sold back to the company by the estate in August 1992, and Carey was cleared of the charges. In May 1994, Carey was accused of corruption regarding a number of real estate deals. The Independent Review Board (IRB), a three-member panel created under a Federal court order in 1989 designed to help supervise the union's elections and rid it of corruption, began an investigation into how Carey was able to finance hundreds of thousands of dollars in real estate investments and into who may have forged Carey's estranged wife's signature on several documents. Carey later admitted he had forged his wife's signature but claimed he did so with her permission. Carey said he financed all the investments though savings, loans from relatives, and his $1.9 million inheritance. Carey was cleared by the IRB of all charges in July 1994. The IRB said no fraudulent activity had occurred in the financing of the deals. Although Carey did forge his wife's signature and asked a union employee to lie about it, the IRB concluded that Carey's wife had given him permission to sign her name and that the forgeries were unrelated to union activities.

Carey did take extensive measures to clean up the union, however. In September 1992, he trusteed 18,000-member Local 237 in New York City for corruption, which led to an extensive battle for control of the local. In January 1994, he trusteed Local 732 to remove it from the influence of the Lucchese crime family, and trusteed Local 851 (which represented workers at John F. Kennedy International Airport) for being under the influence of organized crime as well. He investigated the Local 819 health plan for selling policies to non-members and denying reimbursement to members to fund the scheme; trusteed the local representing workers at the Jacob K. Javits Convention Center for corruption and nepotism; trusteed Local 97 in Union, New Jersey, for being under the control of the Genovese crime family; trusteed Local 875 after federal investigators found that more than $8 million had vanished from the union's pension fund; and trusteed Local 1205 after finding that the union put non-members into its health plan, engaged in nepotism, and had violated federal pension regulations. By mid-August 1995, Carey had trusteed 51 of the union's 651 local unions (mostly on the recommendations of the Independent Review Board). The number had risen to 67 by July 1996. The changes did not come without a backlash. Carey received a number of death threats during his first term, and hired bodyguards to protect himself and his family.

Carey also significantly restructured the union's finances. He undertook two initiatives in this area. The first was to close the international union's four regional headquarters in the U.S. Carey depicted the regional headquarters as little more than a mechanism for union officers to engage in corruption and receive multiple salaries, but his opponents claimed that the move was retaliation against Carey's political opponents (who were officers in and drew income from the regional headquarters). The fight to close the offices was a bitter one, and Carey eventually sought a federal preliminary injunction to enforce his right to physically enter and take charge of the offices. The Teamsters' executive board gave him permission to close the offices by a vote of 14 to 3, and the regional headquarters were shuttered in June 1994—saving the international union $15 million in salaries and expenses. His second major initiative was to seek a 25 percent dues increase. Carey proposed the dues hike in February 1994. The union's executive board had voted to raise strike benefits from $55 a week to $200, but made no provision for funding the higher benefits. A dues hike was essential, Carey said, because the strike fund anticipated running out of money in mid-1994 (and did just that during the national trucking strike in June 1994). Carey also said that the union's budget was significantly out of balance. The union had lost 500,000 members since 1979 and assets had fallen to $45 million from almost $200 million in 1990. But Teamsters members turned down the dues hike proposal by a 3-to-1 majority in March 1994, and as Carey predicted the union was forced to borrow money from other unions to continue operating. Carey balanced the union's budget in 1996, but did so (in part) by reducing strike benefits back to $55 a week and warned that the union would have to use its general fund to pay strike benefits in the future.

Carey negotiated two major contracts in his first term (for UPS and freight drivers), and both included concessions. He led the Teamsters through national strikes against UPS and the trucking industry, and neither strike ended well. Carey called a one-day strike on February 6, 1994, against UPS after the carrier doubled the allowable weight limit on packages. Many locals did not establish picket lines (although company operations in the Northeast were heavily disrupted), and the company refused to enforce to the lower weight limit. It was the first national strike against UPS. Carey was strongly criticized by union members and leaders for mishandling the strike, and UPS eventually sued the union for $50 million in damages. A month later, Carey led the union through a long strike against the national trucking industry. Trucking Management Inc., a negotiating group representing 23 major trucking companies (including Consolidated Freightways, Yellow Freight, Roadway Express, and Carolina Freight), and the union fought over the use of part-time workers during peak freight periods and an increase in the use of rail rather than trucks to haul freight. The strike was considered a major test of Carey's credibility and his control of the union. But after 17 days the strike began to slowly die, and Carey agreed to federal mediation in order to win a new contract.

Carey also beefed up the union's organizing efforts, and stanched the loss of members. By 1996, the union had reversed years of membership decline, recording a net gain of 4,000 new members.

Within the AFL-CIO, Carey was considered a reformer, and he supported challenger John Sweeney's run for president of the AFL-CIO in 1996.

== Carey's Second Term ==
=== Re-election campaign ===
James P. Hoffa began seeking support for a run at the Teamsters' presidency in February 1994. Hoffa formally announced his candidacy on September 4, 1995.

Carey and Hoffa battled fiercely at the Teamsters' convention in July 1996. Hoffa introduced a resolution to deny convention voting rights to 80 delegates from the union's staff, although this right had been given to all previous presidents. Carey ordered a voice vote on the motion, announced that the motion was defeated, and ignored calls for a division of the house. Throughout the convention, Hoffa and his supporters introduced resolutions and constitutional amendments intended to transfer authority from the president and give it to local and regional offices. Hoffa's supporters were well-organized and highly disciplined, and they defeated Carey on several minor votes. But once it became clear that Hoffa had a slim majority of the 1,900 delegates, Carey used the power of parliamentary procedure to delay or defeat the proposals, and his supporters brought the convention to a halt by offering amendment after amendment to Hoffa's proposals.

Shortly after the convention ended, Carey trusteed 10,000-member Local 714 in Chicago, Illinois. The IRB had concluded that Carey supporter William Hogan was running the local for his own benefit, but Carey's action led Hogan to endorse Hoffa—a serious blow to Carey's re-election chances.

Carey's re-election campaign was an exceptionally bitter and close one. Hoffa drew strong support from Teamsters members in the Midwest and the West (with New York state a battleground), and from union leaders unhappy with Carey's anti-corruption drive and his attempt to dismantle regional and local bases of power. Hoffa attacked Carey for being a "chicken" and a "scaredy cat", and blasted Carey's campaign literature as "slimy pieces of half-truths". Carey derogatorily referred to Hoffa as "Junior," and denounced him as a "flunky" of the "old guard", "the same old mobbed-up, on-the-take teamster his daddy was", an "imposter," and all "smoke and mirrors." The war of words became so heated that in late September Carey filed a libel suit against Hoffa. Carey repeatedly tried to link Hoffa to organized crime, and publicized the criminal past and mob ties of Hoffa associates and business partners. Hoffa accused Carey of overseeing the loss of 40,000 members, mismanaging the union's finances, agreeing to concessionary contracts, and corruption. Carey countered by claiming he had reversed the union's membership decline, balanced the union's budget for the first time in 10 years, defeated a trucking industry proposal to use part-time temporary drivers, and rooted out corruption in the union. The election was the most expensive in Teamsters history: Hoffa raised $1.3 million in contributions, while Carey raised $1.8 million and incurred $200,000 in debt.

On December 16, 1996, federal election overseers announced that Carey had defeated Hoffa, 52 percent to 48 percent. More than 475,000 ballots were cast in the election. The vote count proceeded very slowly, leading to protests from both candidates the vote-counting rules had been violated. Carey declared victory on December 15, 1996. Hoffa, however, refused to concede, claiming 31,000 challenged ballots remained to be counted. Federal officials overseeing the election confirmed the victory the next day, and certified the election on January 10, 1997. Later analyses showed that Carey drew most of his support from Teamsters locals in the East and Deep South and Canada, Hoffa led in the Midwest, and the two candidates were neck and neck in the West. Despite the victory, many observers noted that Hoffa ran a much stronger campaign than expected. Many union members were attracted by the Hoffa name, while others (particularly in the Midwest) felt Carey had negotiated weak contracts. But federal officials and labor movement insiders pointed out that Carey had undermined the power, income, prestige, and perks of hundreds of local union officials through his anti-corruption drive. Hoffa had the support of a large majority of these local leaders, and they ensured that the Hoffa message reached the rank and file and the Carey message did not.

=== Accusations of financial impropriety ===
Ron Carey served less than a year of his second term. He was accused of engaging in financial improprieties during his re-election campaign in March 1997. As an investigation by federal officials continued, Carey led the union in a nationwide strike against UPS in August 1997 which led to significant contracts gains. But just three months later, Carey took a leave of absence as president due to the ongoing investigation into his 1996 re-election campaign. Carey was barred from running for president the same day he announced his leave of absence, and he was permanently ejected from the union in July 1998. James P. Hoffa was elected president of the Teamsters in December 1998.

The scandal which unseated Ron Carey as president of the Teamsters began when Hoffa accused Carey of illegal re-election campaign activities on March 19, 1997, three months after the election. Hoffa asserted that, at the direction of President Carey, the Teamsters union had paid $97,000 to Michael Ansara, owner of a Massachusetts-based direct mail firm, for get-out-the-vote work in the 1996 Presidential and Congressional elections—work which was not done. Ansara's wife, Barbara Arnold, then made a $95,000 contribution to the Carey re-election effort days later. The deal, Hoffa alleged, had been brokered by Martin Davis, owner of another direct mail business which had done work for the union and the Carey campaign. Hoffa claimed the donation was pivotal because it permitted the Carey campaign to make a last-minute anti-Hoffa mailing. The use of union funds in a race for union office is prohibited by federal law, and it is also illegal for employers or their family members to contribute to union elections. Carey dismissed the allegations, claiming that it was mere "serendipity" that the donation came on the heels of the payment. Nonetheless, Carey returned the donation, and a day later returned another $126,000 in donations to other contributors without explanation. The refunds constituted nearly 10 percent of Carey's total campaign fund-raising. On March 26, a Federal grand jury in Manhattan began investigating the allegations. On June 6, 1997, the U.S. Department of Justice indicted Davis on charges of conspiracy, embezzlement, and violations of federal labor law for masterminding the kickback scheme. Ansara pleaded guilty to conspiracy and admitted he had used the union's money to reimburse his wife for her donations to the Carey re-election effort. The Carey campaign tried to shield its internal documents from federal investigators, arguing they were protected by attorney–client privilege, but this claim was dismissed by the United States Court of Appeals for the Second Circuit.

=== UPS strike ===
As the financial scandal worsened, Carey faced a major strike against UPS.

Carey had ordered Teamsters staff and local leaders to begin preparing for a strike against UPS a year before the contract expiration deadline. A questionnaire was sent to all Teamster-represented workers at UPS asking them what their key contract issues were, and the union made those issues the centerpiece of its negotiation strategy and strike effort. The union also circulated a petition which obtained 100,000 member signatures supporting its negotiating strategy, held numerous small rallies four months ahead of the strike deadline to identify and overcome problems with member mobilization, distributed 50,000 whistles for use at rallies, distributed hundreds of thousands of pro-union stickers, and forced local unions to build effective communications networks. Shop stewards at UPS received a seven-minute video about the negotiations, and delegates to the Teamsters convention in July 1996 received a "Countdown to Contract" booklet which outlined the union's negotiating and strike strategy and suggested ways locals could put pressure on the company. The union also established a strike Web site which it updated every few hours, established a system for faxing negotiating and strike bulletins to locals, set up a toll-free hot line for striking workers, and worked to ensure that part-timer workers supported full-timer workers and vice versa.

The UPS strike preparations also fed into Carey's effort to rebuild the union's organizing capacity. Carey proposed tripling the union's organizing budget to 10 percent from 3 percent, getting 10,000 union members to be volunteer organizers, and securing a commitment from 150 of the union's 651 locals to hire full-time organizers and set aside 15 percent of their budgets for recruiting new members. If the union could win most of its negotiating goals at the bargaining table, Carey intended to use the new UPS contract to help organize workers at FedEx and Overnite Transportation.

As the August 1, 1997, strike deadline approached, the talks broke down. On July 30, the company presented its final offer, which the union rejected. Officials with the Federal Mediation and Conciliation Service met with the two sides on July 31: Both sides agreed to return to the bargaining table, and the union agreed to extend its strike deadline by four days. Carey presented a new proposal to the company on August 2, but UPS officials rejected it. Talks resumed on the evening of August 3. UPS officials later said they offered to make significant compromises similar to those contained in the eventual contract (including withdrawal of its pension proposal), but Carey disputed that account and said the company's last proposal contained little that was new.

Carey's strike preparation efforts paid off when talks between the company and union broke down and 185,000 union members struck on August 4, 1997. The strike involved more workers than any other strike in the 1990s. Carey focused on just a handful of contract issues: That UPS create full-time positions rather than part-time positions in the future, convert several thousand part-time workers to full-time, increase part-time pay significantly, and remain in the union's multi-employer pension plan rather than create its own. UPS executives asked President Bill Clinton to invoke the Taft-Hartley Act, which would force the union back to work, but the President said that the conditions required by the Act had not been met. Some Hoffa supporters claimed that Carey had forced a strike to draw attention away from his legal troubles, but most observers concluded that the union could not accept the company's final offer (which included a 1.5 percent raise for full-time workers, no raise for part-timers, and withdrawal from the Teamsters' multiemployer pension plan). Because the Teamsters' strike fund had run out in 1994, UPS officials believed that the union could not sustain a strike for more than a week. But on August 12, the AFL-CIO announced it would loan the Teamsters $10 million a week until the strike ended.

Pressure on UPS to end the strike increased swiftly. The company lost $30 million to $50 million a day as it continued to pay non-striking workers to keep the company running. On August 13, Secretary of Labor Alexis Herman privately intervened in the strike with the support of President Clinton, and was able to get the two sides talking again. Carey and the Teamsters also undertook a sophisticated public relations effort. They depicted the union members as average people (the union's spokespeople were often rank and file Teamsters), and mobilized the public's sympathy for UPS drivers by having strikers drive their regular delivery routes to give their customers information about the strike. They also made strategic use of the Internet, using the union's Web site to issue updates and put pressure on Congress. UPS also engaged in a strong public relations effort (using full-page newspaper advertisements and pressuring customers to ask the President to invoke Taft-Hartley), but most observers as well as some UPS officials agreed that the union had the better P.R. effort. A Gallup poll found that 55 percent of respondents supported the union.

UPS had seriously underestimated the union's capacity to wage a strike. Most importantly, UPS officials simply did not believe a strike would occur. But company officials also did not realize the importance of the union's early mobilization efforts, believed the union was too divided between the Carey and Hoffa camps to wage an effective strike, and believed thousands of Teamsters would cross the picket line to return to work. As the strike began, many UPS executives felt they could pressure Carey into offering the company's final offer to the Teamster membership and that the members would accept this offer.

Carey won a major contract victory on August 18, 1997. Talks had resumed on August 7 but ended two days later. After five days of silence, talks began again on August 14 under the personal supervision of Labor Secretary Herman at the Hyatt Regency Washington hotel across the street from the Teamsters' headquarters. After two days of nearly continuous bargaining, UPS withdrew its pension demand. President Clinton personally spoke to both parties over the weekend to encourage them to continue bargaining, and a final tentative contract emerged on Monday afternoon, August 18. The pact included several major concessions by the employer: Starting pay of part-time workers would increase for the first time since 1982, 10,000 part-time jobs would be converted into full-time jobs, UPS would stay in the union's multi-employer pension plan, most workers would see significant benefit increases, and five-sixths of all new full-time jobs would be filled by existing part-timers. The union agreed to a five-year contract rather than the proposed four-year deal. The company had lost more than $600 million in business during the strike, and fears of even larger losses had finally led it to concede. The 50-person Teamsters bargaining committee and conference of 200 UPS locals ratified the agreement on August 19.

The UPS strike was a major boost for Ron Carey. His opponents agreed that he had emerged politically stronger from the battle. Carey quickly announced plans to boost organizing efforts at Federal Express, using the gains won in the UPS contract as a major selling point for the union.

=== Re-election financial scandal and expulsion from Teamsters ===
The donation kickback scheme which led to Carey's eventual expulsion from the Teamsters was created in July 1996. Early internal Carey re-election campaign polls showed Carey losing badly to Hoffa. Hoffa was also out-raising Carey in funds by more than 4-to-1, and the Carey campaign and outside fund-raising consultants were convinced much of Hoffa's funds were coming from organized crime sources. Carey re-election campaign aides, however, were confident Carey could win if he could bypass the local leadership (which supported Hoffa) and get his message directly to Teamsters members. In late July, Carey campaign manager Jere Nash met with Martin Davis, who owned The November Group (a direct-marketing company). Nash and Davis concluded a direct mail and phone bank effort would cost $700,000, money the Carey campaign did not have. Nash agreed to raise $300,000 and Davis agreed to raise the rest. Davis sought out fund-raiser Michael Ansara to brainstorm ways to raise the funds. On October 6, Ansara went to California and met with 300 wealthy donors to liberal causes. One of those donors was a major fund-raiser for Citizen Action, a coalition of left-wing public interest organizations with chapters in 24 states. The donor and Ansara hatched a plan: In exchange for a $475,000 donation to Citizen Action, the Carey campaign would get a $100,000 donation from Citizen Action and Citizen Action would pay $75,000 to Ansara. Meanwhile, Davis contacted AFL-CIO secretary-treasurer Richard Trumka and allegedly concocted a scheme whereby the Teamsters would donate $150,000 to the AFL-CIO for spurious get-out-the-vote efforts and the AFL-CIO would pay the same amount to Citizen Action. Citizen Action would then pay $100,000 to The November Group, which would use the cash to finance Carey's direct marketing effort. Davis also met with members of the Clinton-Gore campaign, and suggested that the Teamsters would make major donations to Democratic state parties if wealthy donors (who, for whatever reason, might be prohibited by law from donating to political parties) would make donations to the Carey re-election bid. The Teamsters donated $236,500 to Democratic state parties, but when no acceptable donations were made to the Carey campaign by the wealthy donors the scheme fell apart and no donation exchanges were made.

Five days after Carey's historic victory at the bargaining table in the UPS strike, details of the donations kickback scheme were unveiled by the court-appointed federal official overseeing the union's elections. The report revealed that the donations kickback scheme included Citizen Action. The report said that Carey had approved a $475,000 donation to Citizen Action, and that Citizen Action had donated $75,000 of this money to the Carey re-election effort. The August 23 report also indicated that the Democratic National Committee (DNC) had been approached by Carey campaign officials. The report did not, however, conclude that Carey knew of the transactions and referred the matter to federal prosecutors for further investigation. Based on the report's findings, federal officials overturned the 1996 Teamsters presidential election, and called for new rules that would bar non-Teamsters from contributing to union election campaigns and establish a $1,000 contribution limit. The Independent Review Board opened its own inquiry into the financial scandal on August 27.

The scandal widened throughout September and October. Although Carey had not been disqualified from being a candidate in the re-run election, new evidence and witnesses had caused federal officials to reconsider that opinion by mid-September. As Carey kicked off his second re-election bid, a federal grand jury began investigating whether the Teamsters' donations to the Democratic Party violated federal law. Four days later, Carey accused the Hoffa campaign of also engaging in improper fund-raising in 1996, and federal investigators agreed to look into those charges. Carey repeated the charge several times over the next few months. Hoffa said all his donations had come in sums of less than $100, which did not have to be reported. On August 17, federal prosecutors said that they had evidence that the AFL-CIO may have contributed $150,000 to Citizen Action for spurious get-out-the-vote efforts in an attempt to get Citizen Action to give $100,000 to the Carey campaign, and that AFL-CIO secretary-treasurer Richard Trumka was implicated in the scheme. On September 19, Martin Davis pleaded guilty to mail fraud and embezzlement, and conspiracy to commit fraud, to make false statements, and to embezzling funds. Jere Nash, Carey's 1996 re-election campaign manager, also pleaded guilty to making false statements and conspiracy. During their plea hearing, Davis, Ansara, and Nash revealed in court that leaders of several other unions had given $20,000 to the Carey campaign in violation of federal laws barring union leaders from contributing to the election campaigns of candidates in other unions, and that Carey campaign officials had lied about these donations. Three staff members at the Teamsters testified in mid-October that they were pressured to give more than $1,000 to the Carey campaign or lose their jobs. On October 22, the IRB accused William Hamilton, the union's former political director, of conspiring with Nash, Davis, Ansara, and others in the donation kickback scheme.

Carey contended he knew nothing of the donation kickback scheme. He said that he had approved the large political donations to Citizen Action, the AFL-CIO, and other groups, but that he had relied too heavily on the advice of his aides and did not notice that the donations were much larger than in the past or were being made to some groups the Teamsters did not have long-standing relationships with. He testified before a grand jury in August and October 1997 that he knew nothing of the kickbacks, only the donations.

In late September, the re-run of the Teamsters presidential election was set for January 1998, albeit with much stricter limits on campaign contributions and greater disclosure requirements.

On November 17, 1997, a federal official overseeing the Teamsters disqualified Ron Carey from seeking elective office in the union, concluding that Carey knew of and approved the donation kickback scheme. Three Teamsters began to vie for the nomination to oppose Hoffa: Tom Leedham, director of the union's warehouse division; Ken Hall, Carey's chief strategist during the UPS strike; and George Cashman, president of a Boston-area truck drivers' local. Although Teamsters for a Democratic Union continued to support Carey as he fought the disqualification, they also debated what strategy to pursue in the event that the disqualification was upheld. Meanwhile, Carey and the Justice Department signed an agreement in which a federal monitor would oversee the union's spending to prevent any additional improper expenditures. Carey sued to have the disqualification overturned, but a U.S. district court and the Court of Appeals for the Second Circuit both refused his request.

Carey's accusations against Hoffa, however, led federal officials to seek a delay in the Teamster election to investigate these charges. A 45-day delay was granted. A second delay was sought and granted in January 1998. Hoffa was cleared of all major wrongdoing in late April 1998.

On November 25, 1997, Ron Carey took a leave of absence from the Teamsters, just hours before the Independent Review Board accused him of illegally using union money to fund his 1996 re-election campaign and failing to meet his fiduciary duties. Carey staunchly defended himself before the IRB, claiming that the accusations against him were based on the testimony of a single person (Jere Nash) who was trying to avoid prison time by implicating Carey. He directly contradicted testimony by his former executive secretary, who said Carey knew of the kickbacks to his campaign. Carey's attorney pointed out that the executive secretary had changed her testimony several times the past year, and that it had been undermined by testimony from another secretary and a mail clerk who both testified that the executive secretary admitted forging Carey's initials on donation approvals. However, Carey admitted that he had not adequately overseen the union's finances, and did not know that the union had spent close to $1 million in political contributions during a 10-day period in October 1996. The Independent Review Board expelled Ron Carey for life from the Teamsters union on July 27, 1998. The IRB concluded Carey breached his fiduciary duty, but that there was insufficient evidence to conclude that he approved or knew about the donation kickback scheme. "A fair inference to be drawn from all the facts is that Carey closed his eyes because he knew or suspected that those contributions were to generate a personal benefit for him, i.e., benefits to his campaign," the Board concluded.

James P. Hoffa won election as President of the Teamsters union on December 5, 1998. He defeated Tom Leedham, 55 percent to 39 percent (with a third candidate garnering 6 percent).

== Post-Teamsters life and death ==
The Teamsters sued Carey for unspecified damages in 2000 for approving $885,000 in political donations in exchange for contributions to Carey's re-election campaign.

Carey was indicted on federal perjury charges in January 2001. He was accused of making false statements to the grand jury in his August and October 1996 testimonies, and for lying to federal officials overseeing the Teamsters election and to the Independent Review Board. Carey pleaded not guilty. Carey's trial began in August 2001, and he was found not guilty on all charges on October 12, 2001.

Carey continued to protest the lifetime ban on Teamster membership for many years. He argued that his court vindication had proven the IRB wrong for expelling him, and that a lifetime ban should be applied only to those Teamsters associated with organized crime—not officials who may have engaged in other sorts of wrongdoing.

In 2007, Carey was researching and writing a book based on his experiences. He was critical of the policies of his successor, particularly the centralization of authority in the international headquarters, business-model organizing, and giving Teamsters officials permission to draw multiple salaries again.

Ron Carey died of lung cancer at New York Hospital Queens in New York City at age 72 on December 11, 2008.

== Other activities ==
A Roman Catholic, Carey coached softball at Queen of Peace Roman Catholic Church in Queens, New York City, in the 1960s and 1970s. He was also very active in the American Parkinson Disease Association (he was elected its national vice president in 1971), and sat on the boards of the American Cancer Society and Boys Clubs.

Trade union offices
Preceded by William J. McCarthy	President of the International Brotherhood of Teamsters; 1992–1998	Succeeded by James P. Hoffa
Preceded by Walter Shea	President of the Transportation Trades Department; 1995–1998	Succeeded by Sonny Hall
