= Teamsters for a Democratic Union =

American labor organization

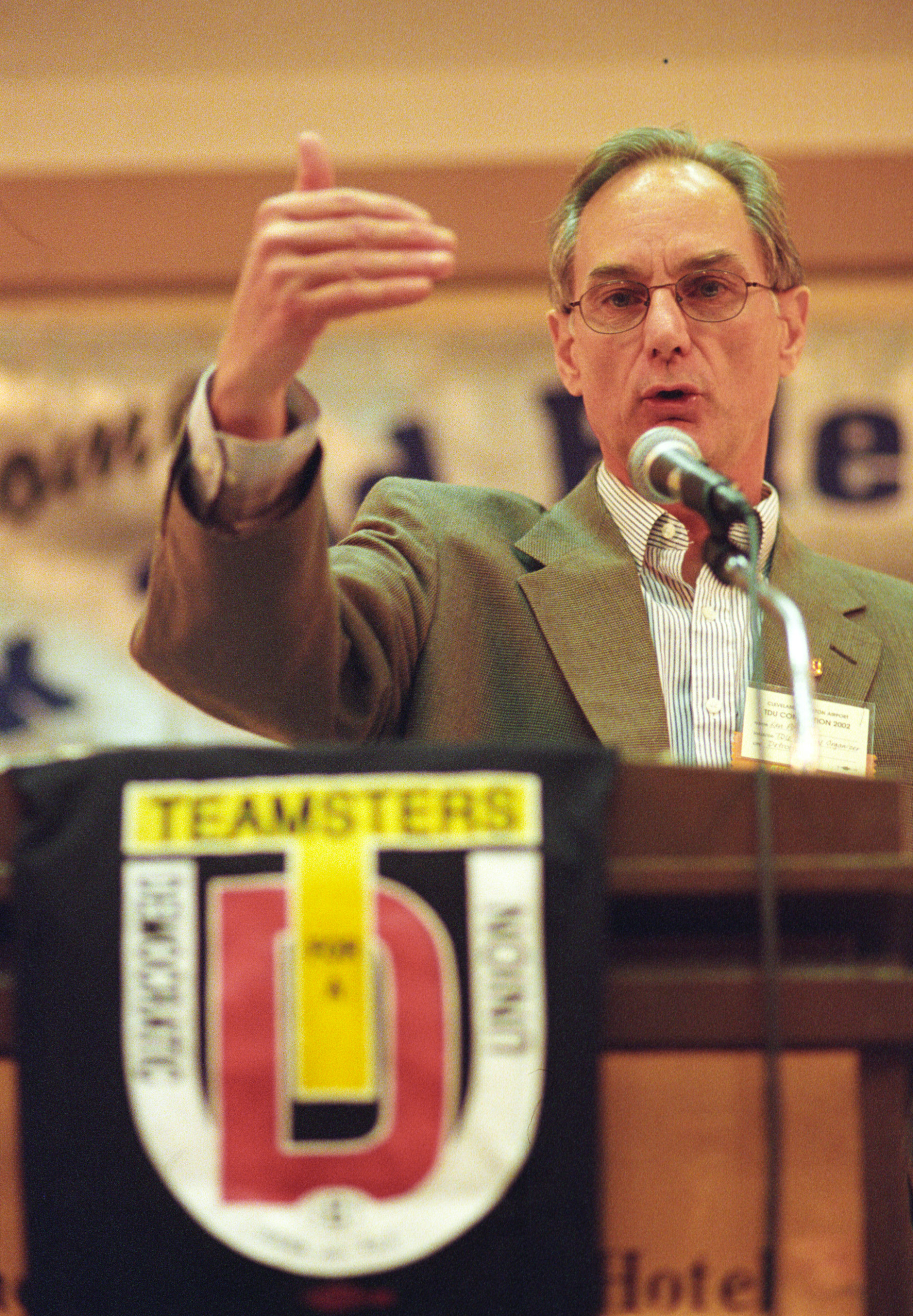
- Founded: June 5, 1976
- Headquarters: Detroit, Michigan
- Location: United States/Canada
- Key people: Ken Paff
- Affiliations: Teamster Reformers
- Website: www.tdu.org

Teamsters for a Democratic Union (TDU) is a grassroots rank and file organization whose goal is to reform the International Brotherhood of Teamsters (IBT), or Teamsters Union. The organization has chapters nationwide in the United States and Canada.

== History ==
TDU was started in Cleveland, Ohio, in the 1970s, as an alliance of socialists who had taken Teamster jobs and a layer of militant truck drivers who had been organizing against contract concessions, after the federal government exposed extensive corruption in the union, which included leadership raiding union-held pension funds, collusion with organized crime, and collusive collective bargaining between union officials and employers at the expense of union members.

== TDU activists ==
- Dan La Botz
- Pete Camarata
- Thomas Geoghegan
- Paul Alan Levy, general counsel 1984–1999
- Ken Paff
- Sandy Pope, 2011 candidate for IBT president

== Endorsements ==
In November 2019, TDU members voted to endorse the Teamsters United O'Brien/Zuckerman slate for International President and Secretary/Treasurer.
