= 1905 Chicago teamsters' strike =

Sympathy strike

1905 Chicago Teamsters' strike
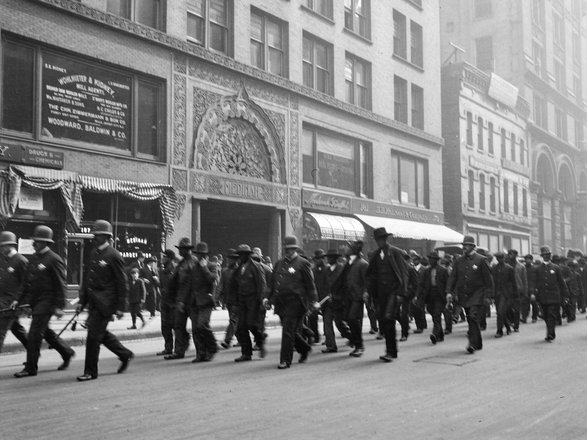
- Police and strikebreakers in front of Medinah Building
- Date: April–July 1905
- Location: Chicago, Illinois, US
- Goals: Closed shop
- Methods: Strikes; protest; demonstrations

Parties
United Brotherhood of Teamsters	Employers' Association of Chicago; Strikebreakers

Lead figures
Cornelius Shea; Charles Dold	John G. Shedd; Levy Mayer

Casualties and losses
Deaths: 21; Injuries: 416; Arrests: 12	

The 1905 Chicago Teamsters' strike was a sympathy strike and lockout by the United Brotherhood of Teamsters in the summer of 1905 in the city of Chicago, Illinois. The strike was initiated by a small clothing workers' union. But it soon spread as nearly every union in the city, including the Teamsters, supported the job action with sympathy strikes. Initially, the strike was aimed at the Montgomery Ward department store, but it affected almost every employer in the metropolitan region after the Teamsters walked out. The strike eventually pitted the Teamsters against the Employers' Association of Chicago, a broad coalition of business owners formed a few years earlier to oppose unionization in Chicago.

The strike was a violent and deadly one. Riots erupted on April 7 and continued almost daily until mid-July. Hundreds and sometimes thousands of striking workers and their supporters would clash with strikebreakers and armed police each day. By late July, when the strike ended, 21 people had been killed and a total of 416 injured. It was the second-most deadly labor dispute in 20th-century American history, surpassed only by the East St. Louis Riot of 1917.

Court testimony in late summer revealed that various businessmen (including the general manager of Montgomery Ward) had taken bribes to lock out their workers. The testimony also revealed that union leaders had asked for and received bribes to end their strikes. The testimony significantly undercut public support for labor unions, and the strike quickly collapsed. The strike is generally considered to have lasted 103 days from the date the Teamsters entered the fray on April 6 until its conclusion on July 19, when most unions voted to withdraw from the dispute.

The strike is considered one of the most important of early 20th-century American history because of its violence, the strength and depth of inter-union solidarity, and the way it dramatically weakened public support for unions nationwide.

== Background ==
The Employers' Association of Chicago (the EA) was formed in 1902 during a strike against telephone equipment manufacturers.

In January 1902, Brass Molder's Union Local 83 struck Stromberg-Carlson and Western Electric, seeking to win the closed shop in collective bargaining negotiations. The employers locked out the workers and brought in strikebreakers. Union members began to physically attack the strikebreakers. On May 7, 1903, the union struck the Kellogg Switchboard & Supply Company. Kellogg Switchboard, too, locked out its workforce and hired strikebreakers. The Teamsters Joint Council of Chicago, a citywide organization of all Teamster locals in the Chicago area, began a sympathy strike on June 24, 1903. The three employers sought injunctions against the sympathy strike, which they won on July 20, 1903. The Brass Molders' strike collapsed soon afterward.

During this strike, the Employers' Association of Chicago was formed. John G. Shedd, vice-president of Marshall Field & Company, was the primary force behind the organization of the group. Shedd became the group's first president. Montgomery Ward president Robert J. Thorne was the EA's first vice-president; grocery store president Frank H. Armstrong of Reid, Murdoch & Company the second vice-president; and William E. Clow, president of plumbing manufacturer J.B. Clow & Co. the secretary. The EA's goal was to secure the open shop, resist unionization, and break unions in workplaces where they existed. The EA was heavily funded by the city's banks and by large companies such as Rand McNally.

The Teamsters quickly became the target of the EA. The Teamsters were one of the largest unions in Chicago. But since the Teamsters controlled the city's transportation network, the union's support was also critical to the success of any other union's job action. In early 1904, the Teamsters aligned all their contracts to expire simultaneously on May 1, 1905. The EA then passed a resolution on June 16, 1904, declaring that no employer would sign a contract with the Teamsters after May 1, 1905.

== Strike ==
On December 15, 1904, 19 clothing cutters at Montgomery Ward went on strike to protest the company's use of nonunion subcontractors. The manager of the fabric cutting room for Montgomery Ward & Co. at the time of the initial incident was C. V. Boller. The Montgomery Ward company locked the remaining workers out. Sympathy strikes by several tailors' unions broke out, as did sympathy strikes by other unions. By April, 5,000 workers were on the picket line, with all 26 local members of the National Tailors' Association (a coalition of clothing manufacturers and retailers) struck.

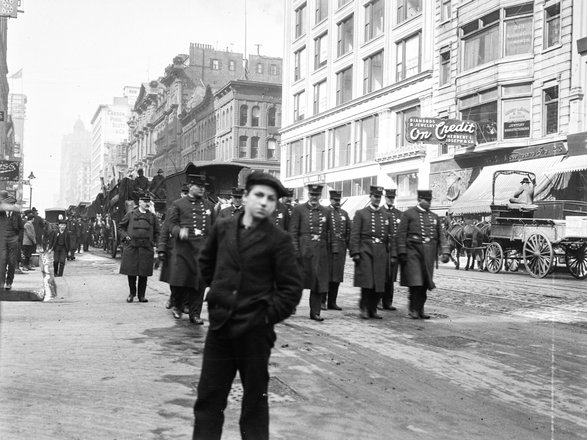
Police escorting a wagon train, April–May 1905

The Teamsters engaged in a sympathy strike on April 6, 1905, adding another 10,000 members to the picket lines. Teamsters President Cornelius Shea targeted Montgomery Ward and Sears, Roebuck and Company in particular, as these were the leaders in the National Tailors' Association. The sympathy strike had not occurred earlier in the year for fear it would have imperiled the candidacy of Edward Fitzsimmons Dunne for Mayor of Chicago.

Violence broke out and continued almost daily until mid-July. Riots occurred on April 7 when Montgomery Ward attempted to use wagons driven by strikebreakers to deliver raw materials and finished goods. The most serious that day involved 1,000 striking workers and sympathizers, who attacked several heavily guarded wagons on Union Street. On April 29, a crowd of 1,000 striking workers and sympathizers clashed with police, and three people were shot and two stabbed. Mayor Dunne immediately banned the carrying of firearms. On May 4, a riot involving more than 5,000 people coursed through the city's streets. Strikers hurled bricks and stones, and assaulted any African American or wagon driver caught on the streets. Police, strikers and strikebreakers used clubs and firearms against one another. During a stone-throwing melee on the Rush Street bridge, strikebreakers opened fire on striking workers, leading to one death. "Slugging"—the beating of non-union workers or union members who crossed picket lines—became common.

The EA mustered its substantial resources to break the Teamsters' support for the striking tailors. The EA collected $250,000 (about $6.7 million in 2017 dollars) from its members to hire strikebreakers. The EA also raised $1 million (about $27 million in 2017 dollars) to establish, on April 13, the Employers' Teaming Association-a new company which, within a matter of weeks, bought out a large number of team owners and imported hundreds of African American strikebreakers from St. Louis to work as teamsters and drive the wagons. Mark Morton, president of Morton Salt and an EA member, convinced the railroads to pressure the remaining team owners to lock out their Teamster members as well. In response, the unions organized a boycott of all banks involved in the fundraising efforts.

With the garment workers' strike all but forgotten, the tailors' union asked that the other unions end their sympathy strikes. The Teamsters, the critical union in the strike, agreed to do so if the employers would agree to rehire all striking workers. But on April 23, Montgomery Ward declared it would defer to the decision of the Employers' Association, and the EA announced a day later that no striking workers should be rehired.

Infuriated, the Teamsters called another 25,000 members off the job on April 25, 1905, paralyzing grocery stores, warehouses, railway shippers, department stores and coal companies. On April 30, the EA and its members then sued nearly every union involved in the strike. Local and state courts issued numerous injunctions against the unions, ordering them to stop picketing and return to work. Historians point out that court actions strongly favored the employers. When a wagon owner refused to do business with Montgomery Ward for fear the Teamsters would picket him, a court forced the team owner to do business with the retailer or be found in contempt of court. In another case, a judge seated a grand jury whose foreman was A. A. McCormick, the reactionary publisher of the Chicago Evening Post.

The writs were sweeping in nature. One of the first, if interpreted literally and enforced, would have stripped the unions of their rights to strike:

:You are enjoined and restrained from in any manner molesting, interfering with, hindering, obstructing or stopping any of Montgomery Ward & Co.'s agents, servants and employés in the lawful operation and business of the company at Chicago or elsewhere, and also from molesting, interfering with, hindering, obstructing or stopping any person going to or from the company's place of business.

You are also restrained from standing or passing along or about the streets for the purpose of and such manner as to interfere with, hinder or obstruct the operation of the company's business of the delivery of merchandise to or from the company and from interfering with or obstructing the passage along the streets of vans, wagons or other vehicles used in the business of the company.

On April 29, 12 prominent labor leaders in Chicago—including Charles Dold, president of the Chicago Federation of Labor; Shea; and 10 other local Teamster presidents—were indicted on six counts of conspiracy to restrain trade, commit violence, and prevent citizens from obtaining work.

The unions appealed to President Theodore Roosevelt on May 7, asking him to investigate the causes of the strike. The unions also requested that the president refuse to send troops to Chicago before investigating the status of the strike first. On May 10, Dold, Shea and other strike leaders met with Roosevelt personally in Chicago. Roosevelt refused to mediate an end to the strike, denounced the use of violence in the strike, and warned the labor leaders to settle the strike quickly before federal military intervention was needed.

With no collective bargaining negotiations scheduled, much of the strike's activities occurred in the courts in May, June and July. Shea refused to appear in court to provide pre-trial testimony regarding the April 29 indictment. When threatened with jail for contempt of court, he finally appeared but answered all questions with variations of "I don't know." The injunctions also began having an effect. In late May, nearly all the building trade unions in Chicago agreed to return to work, significantly weakening the strike.

Shea's handling of the strike came under fire from the executive board of the international Teamsters union. On May 27, the board removed Shea from day-to-day control of the strike and transferred that authority to itself.

After these developments, talks to end the strike began. Agreement was reached on a wide range of issues between May 24 and June 2. But despite threats by Shea to call 8,000 truck drivers out on strike, clothing stores unaffiliated with the EA refused to break ranks and settle with the Teamsters. The strike continued.

== Strike's end ==
The strike ended not through the efforts of the EA or the unions, but due to the allegations of graft made by John C. Driscoll. At the time, Driscoll was secretary (the highest officer) of the Team Owners' Association, the employer group which had locked out the Teamsters after the sympathy strike which began on April 6. On June 2, the grand jury led by McCormick heard testimony by Driscoll. Driscoll claimed that he had taken at least $10,000 in bribes from Thorne and executives at other companies to force the unions out on strike. Driscoll also alleged that the Teamsters and other unions had demanded bribes to end the strike, that the bribes had been delivered, and that Driscoll had skimmed portions of these bribes into his own pocket. $50,000 in canceled checks were produced in court to support Driscoll's claims. Driscoll's accusations unleashed a flood of allegations by other witnesses. Shea and another Teamsters leader, Albert Young, accused Thorne and other employers of offering them bribes to strike business competitors, and offered evidence in court of previous bribes which the Teamster leaders had accepted (and which had led to large strikes). Thorne and other employers countered that Shea and other union leaders had asked for bribes ranging from $20,000 to $50,000 to call off the current strike. On June 3, the grand jury returned bribery and conspiracy indictments against Shea and 19 other union leaders, but none against the employers.

The development was not unsurprising. Each side knew the other was taking bribes early in the strike. Charges of bribery were levied against the leaders of the strike as early as April 16, but were generally ignored. The unions levied their own accusations of bribery against the employers during legal hearings on May 12.

The evening of June 3, Thorne swore out arrest warrants for Shea on charges of criminal libel for making in-court accusations of bribery.

The arrest infuriated Shea. Late that evening, having made bail, he convened an emergency meeting of the Teamster executive board. Ensuring that primarily his supporters attended the meeting, Shea pushed through several resolutions calling for the end to peace talks, reaffirming support for the strike, and praising Shea's handling of the strike. Although negotiations with the employers had nearly reached complete agreement, Shea withdrew his negotiators and repudiated the tentative agreements which had been reached.

Shea was arrested again on June 5, this time for failing to pay bond regarding the June 3 conspiracy indictment.

Although the bribery accusations undercut both sides, public support for the unions suffered most. While nearly every union continued to support the strike publicly, most sent their members back to work by the end of June. The Teamsters continued to support the strike, but various divisions of the union also went back to work in June and July. By August 1, 1905, the strike was over and the employers ended the lockout.

== Impact ==
The strike significantly strengthened the EA, which in the next few years fiercely attacked the Teamsters and other unions for corruption. By the mid-1920s, unionization rates in Chicago had fallen dramatically, and even the once-powerful Chicago Teamsters unions had shrunk to a small, relatively ineffective force.

The strike also caused public support for unions throughout the US to fall. By 1910, due to the publicity surrounding Driscoll's allegations as well as widespread labor-related violence, American labor unions had lost much of the sway over public opinion they once held. In many ways, some scholars argue, labor unions in the United States never recovered this support.

Nearly half the Teamster members who went on strike were not rehired. Most were blackballed and had to find work outside the city.

Cornelius Shea, although indicted three times, was never convicted of any crimes in connection with the 1905 strike. A serious challenge to his control of the Teamsters emerged in August 1905, but he was able to beat back the opposition through a combination of vote fraud and bribery.

== See also ==
- Murder of workers in labor disputes in the United States
- List of US strikes by size
