= Levy Mayer =

American lawyer (1858–1922)

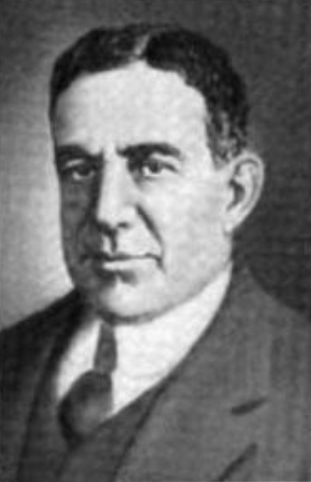
- Born: October 23, 1858; Richmond, Virginia
- Died: August 14, 1922 (aged 63); Chicago, Illinois
- Resting place: Rosehill Cemetery
- Education: Yale University (BA, LLB)
- Occupation: Lawyer
- Spouse: Rachel Meyer (m. 1886)
- Children: 2

Levy Mayer (October 23, 1858 – August 14, 1922) was an American lawyer from Virginia. A child prodigy of law, Mayer graduated from Yale Law School before he could even legally practice the profession in his hometown of Chicago, Illinois. After several years organizing the Chicago Law Library, Mayer practiced with Adolf Kraus. Mayer became one of the most infamous lawyers in Chicago by defending large corporations against anti-trust litigation. Furthermore, he successfully defended the Iroqouis Theater and its manager in the aftermath of the Iroquois Theatre fire. At the time of his death, he was considered one of the richest lawyers in the United States. He is the namesake of Levy Mayer Hall at Northwestern University and his law firm is today known as Mayer Brown.

== Biography ==
Levy Mayer was born in Richmond, Virginia, on October 23, 1858, the sixth of thirteen children. His parents had immigrated from Bavaria three years earlier and moved to Chicago, Illinois when Mayer was young. Mayer attended public schools, including Chicago High School, where he graduated in 1874. He studied at Yale College, then the Yale Law School, graduating in 1876. When he returned to Chicago, he was hired as assistant librarian of the Law Institute in the Rookery Building, as he could not legally practice law until aged 21. He oversaw improvements at the library and, by the time he left, the collection exceeded 17,000 books. He edited two collections of manuscripts from David Rorer, one on judicial & execution sales and the other on interstate or private international law. Mayer also organized the first printed catalog at the library.

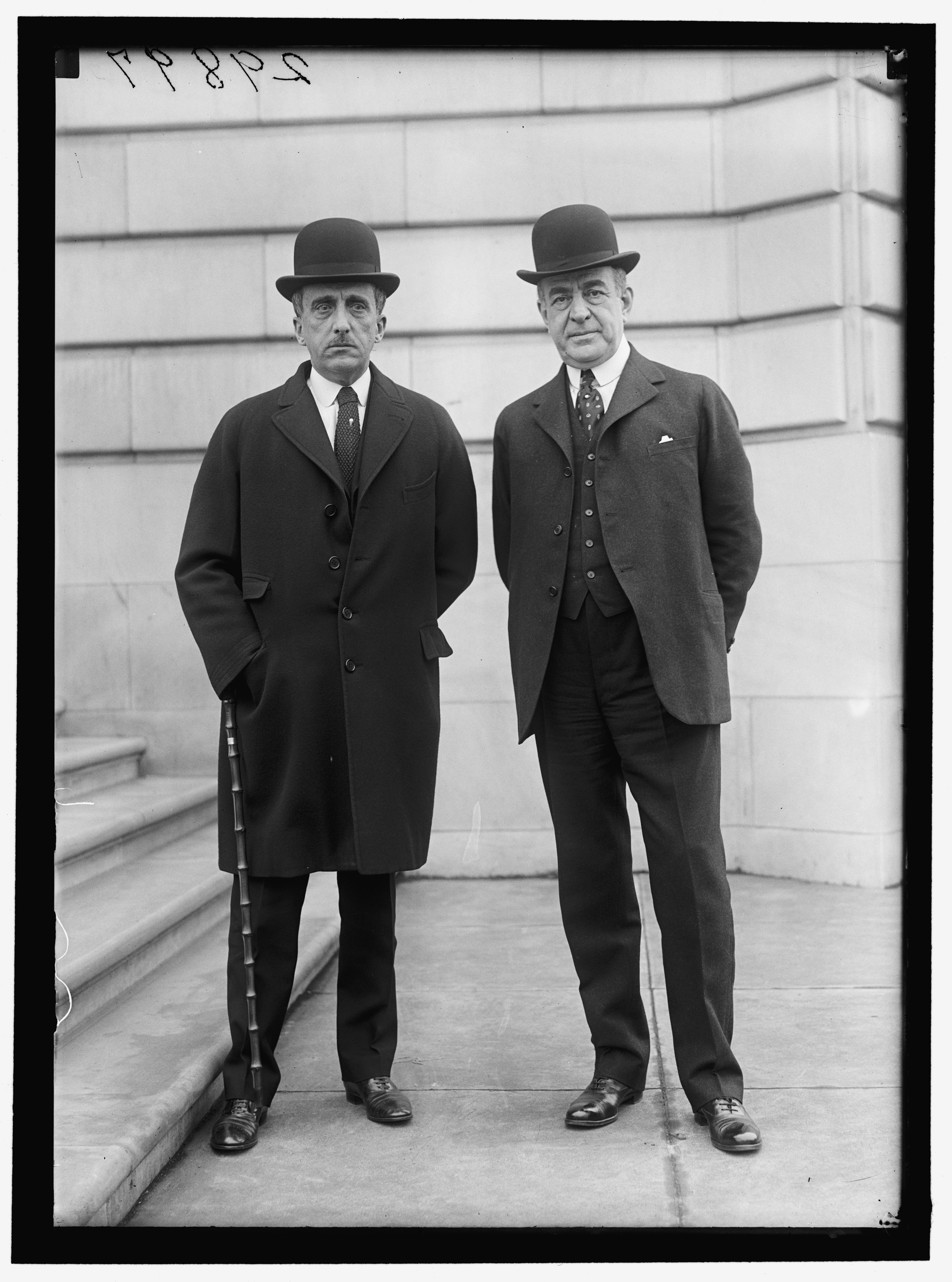
J. Ogden Armour at left with Levy Mayer

The Supreme Court of Illinois admitted Mayer to the bar upon reaching age 21; he then left the library to practice with Kraus & Brackett. When Brackett retired soon afterward, Adolf Kraus admitted Mayer as junior partner of Kraus & Mayer. The firm was later known as Kraus Mayer & Stein and Moran Kraus Mayer & Stein. When Stein and Moran retired, the firm became Moran Mayer & Meyer. The firm focused on constitutional, corporation, and municipal law. He frequently defended corporations facing anti-trust suits, though he was often attacked in the press for it. He received legal fees from businesses he defended from $500,000 to $1 million. Mayer served as the legal adviser to the Chicago City Treasurer, occasionally also serving as adviser to the Cook County Treasurer. At the time of his death, he was the senior partner of Mayer, Meyer, Austrian & Platt and had offices in Chicago and New York City.

=== Major cases ===
Mayer co-founded the Illinois Manufacturers' Association and served as its general counsel. In 1895, he defended the group in the Supreme Court of Illinois in Ritchie v. People, which outlawed the eight-hour workday limit for women. Likewise, he co-founded the Distiller's Securities Corporation. Mayer oversaw the 1899 acquisition of Siemens & Halske Electric Company of America by the Electric Vehicle Company. In 1903, Mayer defended the Iroquois Theatre following the Iroquois Theatre fire. Mayer was able to convince a judge to move the case to Peoria, Illinois and successfully had the charges against theater manager Will Davis dismissed. In 1905, charges against the theater were thrown out. When Illinois courts reopened the case against Davis, he had the venue moved to Danville, Illinois. There, he convinced the judge that the city ordinances that targeted Davis were illegal. Davis was found not guilty.

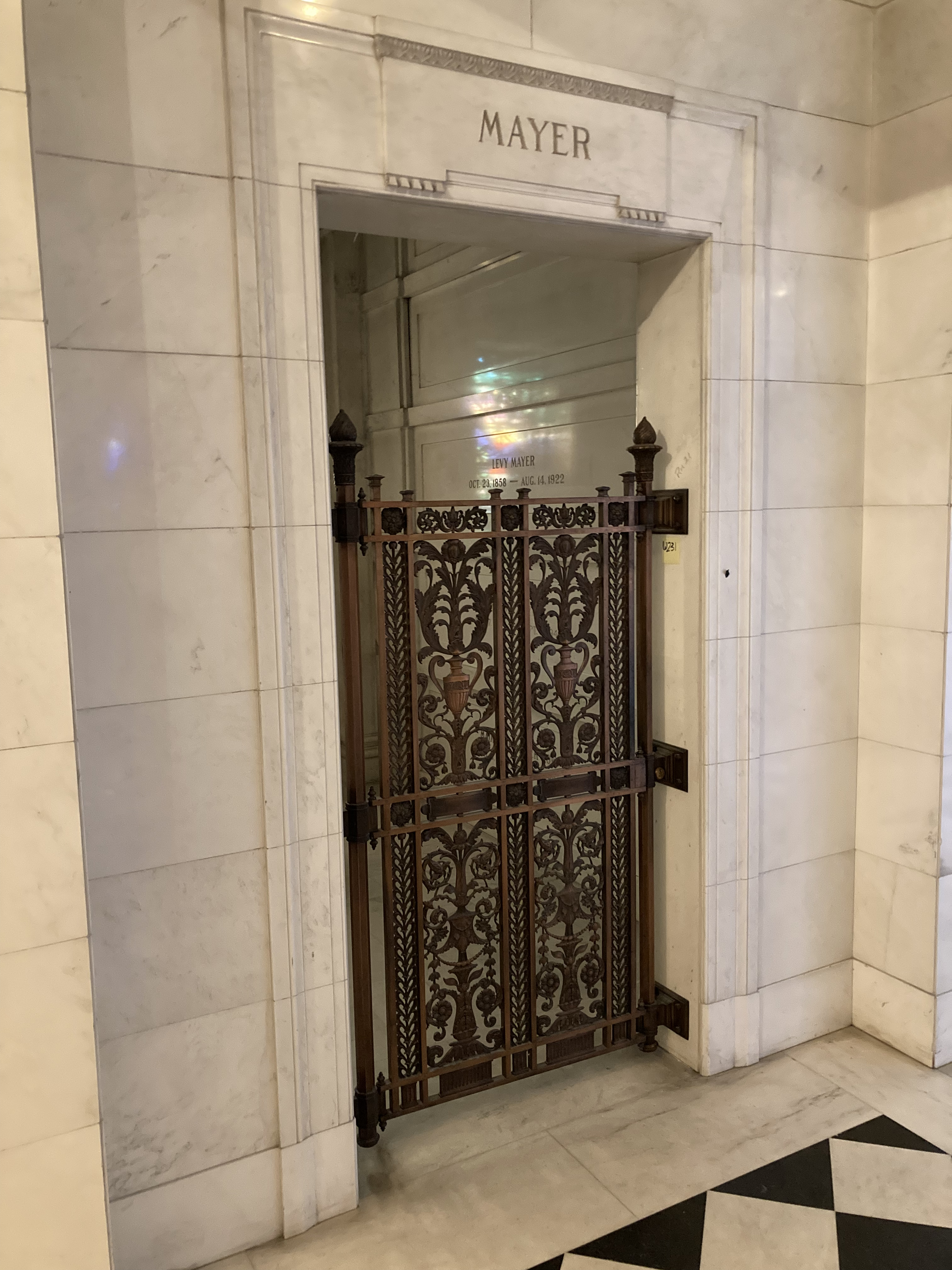
Mayer's grave at Rosehill Mausoleum

Mayer led the defense of the "Beef Trust" in Swift and Company v. United States in the Supreme Court of the United States. Mayer defended the Employers' Association of Chicago against the United Brotherhood of Teamsters in the 1905 Chicago Teamsters' strike. In 1908, he defended the Mattoon City Railway Streetcar Company after an accident resulted in eighteen deaths. He led a fundraiser at the Auditorium Theater in 1916 to support Jews impoverished by World War I. He defended Charles Comiskey in 1919 during the Black Sox Scandal. Late in his life he worked with distillers to fight the Eighteenth Amendment to the United States Constitution. However, the effort was unsuccessful, as the Supreme Court dismissed the case in 1920. He oversaw the sale of the Detroit Times to Arthur Brisbane on behalf of William Randolph Hearst in 1921.

=== Personal life ===
Mayer married Rachel Meyer in 1886; they had two daughters: Hortense and Madeline. Mayer was not active in any religious body or social club, though he did hold a membership in the Union League Club of Chicago, the Germania Club, and the Iroquois Club. He lived on Prairie Avenue in Chicago and had a second home in Boston, Massachusetts, where his children were schooled. In his free time, Mayer collected rare books and wines. He was never active in politics, though he served as a delegate to the 1920 Illinois Constitutional convention.

Mayer died in the Blackstone Hotel on August 14, 1922. At the time of his death, his estate was estimated at $25 million. He was buried in Rosehill Cemetery in Chicago. After his death, Rachel donated a large sum of money to the Northwestern University School of Law; the university dedicated Levy Mayer hall in his honor in 1926. Edgar Lee Masters wrote a biography of Mayer in 1927.

== Cases argued in Supreme Court of the United States ==
Mayer argued the following cases in the nation's highest court:

- Swan Land Cattle Co. v. Frank (1893)
- New Jersey v. Anderson (1906)
- Ferris v. Frohman (1912)
- Keatley v. Furey (1912)
- Hamilton v. Kentucky Distilleries & Warehouse Co. (1919)
- Rhode Island v. Palmer (1920)
- Stafford v. Wallace (1922)
