= Black market =

Market in which goods or services are traded illegally

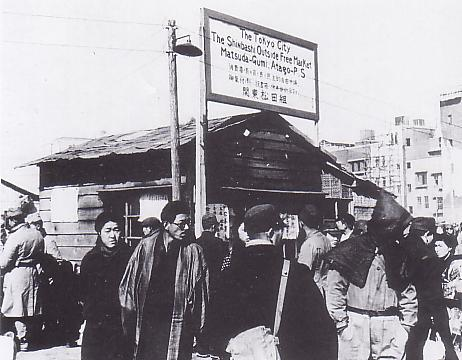
A black market in Shinbashi in 1946

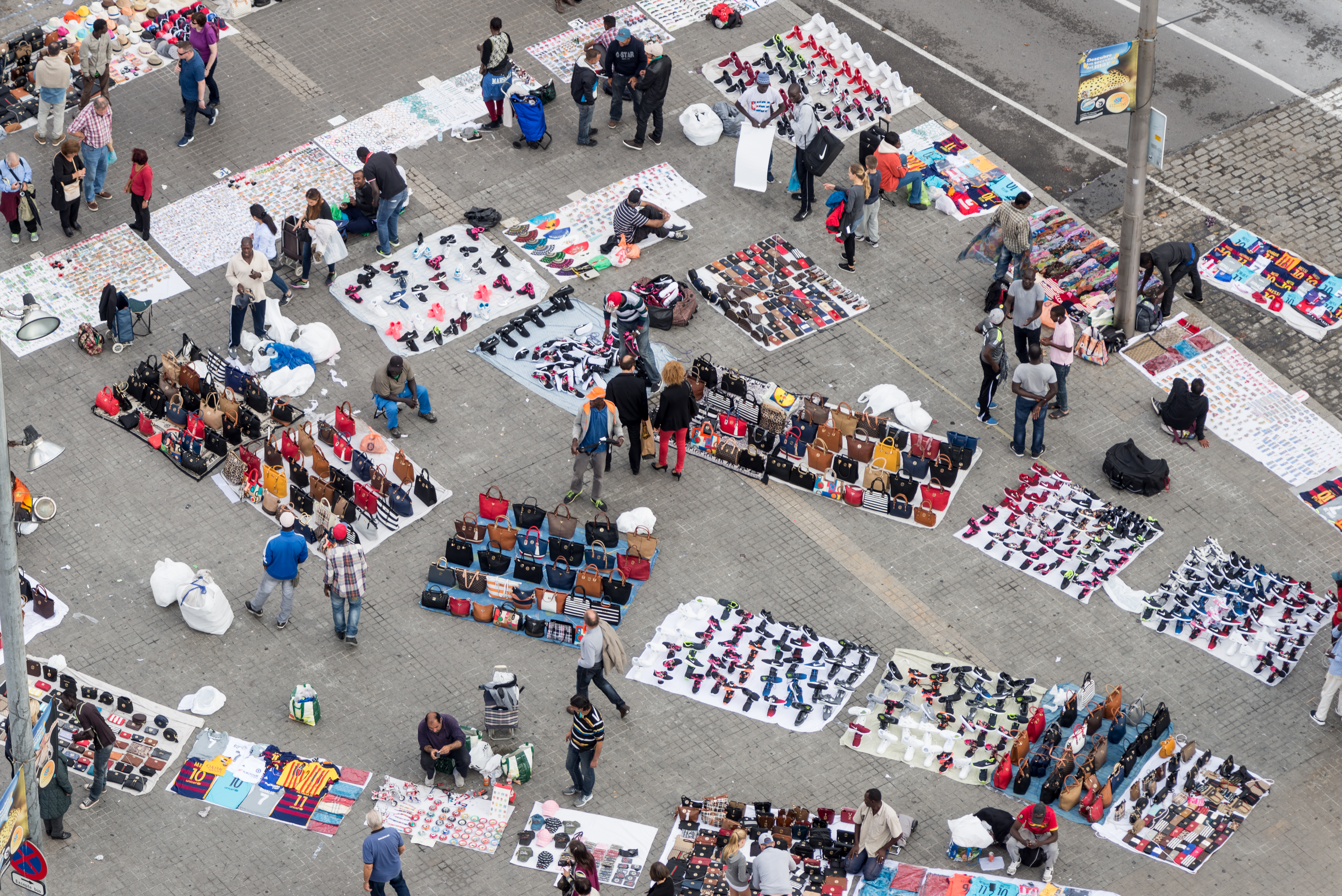
Illegal street traders in Barcelona in 2015

A black market (Note: Also known as an underground economy, shadow market, or shadow economy.) is a clandestine market or series of transactions that has some aspect of illegality within a legal jurisdiction; it may also not be compliant with an institutional set of rules. If the rule defines the set of goods and services whose production and distribution are prohibited or restricted by law, non-compliance with the rule constitutes a black-market trade since the transaction itself is illegal. Such transactions include the illegal drug trade, prostitution (where prohibited), illegal currency transactions, and human trafficking.

Participants often conceal illegal behavior from government authorities or regulators. Cash remains the preferred medium of exchange for illegal transactions, as it is more difficult to trace. Common reasons for engaging in black market activity include trading contraband, avoiding taxes or regulations, or evading price controls and rationing. Such activities are generally referred to using the definite article, e.g., "the black market in bush meat".

The black market is distinct from the grey market, in which commodities are distributed through channels that, while legal, are unofficial, unauthorized, or unintended by the original manufacturer, and the white market, in which trade is legal and official.

Black money is the proceeds of an illegal transaction, on which income and other taxes have not been paid. Black money is often associated with money laundering, a process used to conceal the illegitimate source of the money. Because of the clandestine nature of the black economy, it is not possible to determine its size and scope.

== Definition ==
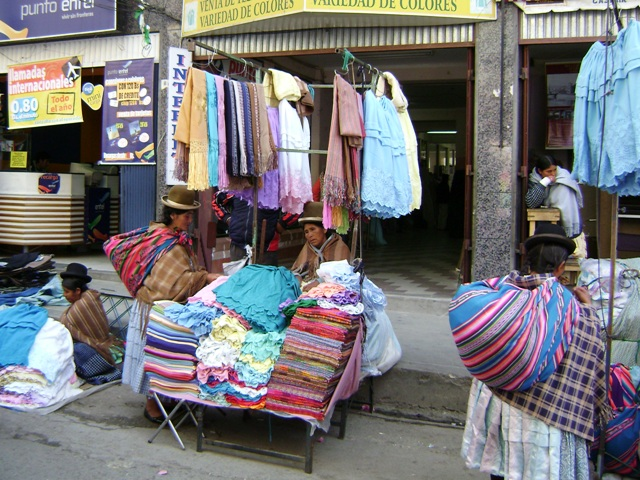
Mercado Negro, so called "Black Market", in La Paz, Bolivia

The literature on the black market has not established a common terminology and has instead offered many synonyms including subterranean, hidden, grey, shadow, informal, clandestine, illegal, unobserved, unreported, unrecorded, second, parallel, and black.

There is no single underground economy; there are many. These underground economies are omnipresent, existing in market oriented as well as in centrally planned nations, be they developed or developing. Those engaged in underground activities circumvent, escape, or are excluded from the institutional system of rules, rights, regulations, and enforcement penalties that govern formal agents engaged in production and exchange. Different types of underground activities are distinguished according to the particular institutional rules that they violate:

1. The illegal economy
2. The unreported economy
3. The unrecorded economy
4. The informal economy

The "illegal economy" consists of economic activities pursued in violation of legal statutes that define the scope of legitimate forms of commerce. Illegal-economy participants produce and distribute prohibited goods and services, such as drugs, weapons, and prostitution.

The "unreported economy" circumvents or evades institutionally established fiscal rules as codified in the tax code. A summary measure of the unreported economy is the amount of income that should be reported to the tax authority but is not so reported. A complementary measure of the unreported economy is the "tax gap": the difference between the amount of tax revenues due to the fiscal authority and the amount of tax revenue actually collected. In the U.S. unreported income is estimated to be $2 trillion resulting in a "tax gap" of $450–600 billion.

The "unrecorded economy" circumvents the institutional rules that define the reporting requirements of government statistical agencies. A summary measure of the unrecorded economy is the amount of unrecorded income, namely the amount of income that should (under existing rules and conventions) be recorded in national accounting systems (e.g., National Income and Product Accounts) but is not. Unrecorded income is a particular problem in transition countries that switched from a socialist accounting system to UN standard national accounting. New methods have been proposed for estimating the size of the unrecorded (non-observed) economy. However little consensus exists on the size of the unreported economies of transitional countries.

The "informal economy" circumvents the costs of, and is excluded from the benefits and rights incorporated in, the laws and administrative rules covering property relationships, commercial licensing, labor contracts, torts, financial credit, and social security systems. A summary measure of the informal economy is the income generated by economic agents that operate informally. The informal sector is part of an economy that is not taxed, monitored by the government, or included in the gross national product (GNP), unlike the formal economy. In developed countries, the informal sector is characterized by unreported employment. This is hidden from the state for tax, social security, or labor law purposes but is legal in other aspects.

The term black market can also be used in reference to a specific part of the economy in which contraband is traded.

== Pricing ==
Goods and services acquired illegally and/or transacted for in an illegal manner may exchange above or below the price of legal market transactions:

- They may be cheaper than legal market prices. The supplier does not have to pay for production costs and/or taxes. This is usually the case in the underground economy. Criminals steal goods and sell them below the legal market price, but there is no receipt, guarantee, and so forth. When someone is hired to perform work and the client is unable to write off the expense (particularly common for work such as home renovations or Cosmetology services), the client may be inclined to request a lower price (usually paid in cash) in exchange for foregoing a receipt, which enables the service provider to avoid reporting the income on his or her tax return.
- They may be more expensive than legal market prices. For example, if the product is difficult to acquire or produce, dangerous to handle, is strictly rationed, or is not easily available legally if at all. If the exchange of goods is made illegal by some sort of state sanction, such as with certain drugs or wildlife trafficking, their prices will tend to rise as a result of that sanction.

== Consumer issues ==
No government, no global nonprofit, no multinational enterprise can seriously claim to be able to replace the 1.8 billion jobs created by the economic underground. In truth, the best hope for growth in most emerging economies lies in the shadows.

— Global Bazaar, Scientific American

Even when the underground market offers lower prices, consumers may still buy on the legal market, when possible, because:

- They may prefer legal suppliers, as these are strictly regulated and easier to contact. In contrast, black market vendors are unregulated and difficult to hold accountable.
- In some jurisdictions such as the United States, customers may be charged with a criminal offense if they knowingly participate in the black economy.
- They may have a moral dislike of black marketing.
- In some jurisdictions such as England and Wales, consumers found in possession of stolen goods can have them confiscated if they are traced, even if they did not know they were stolen. Though they themselves do not usually face criminal prosecution, they are still left without the goods they paid for and have little if any recourse to get their money back. This may make some averse to buying goods that they think may be from the underground market, even if in fact they are legitimate (for example, items sold at a car boot sale).

However, in some situations, consumers may conclude that they are better off using black market services, particularly when government regulations hinder what would otherwise be a legitimate competitive service. For example, in Baltimore, many consumers actively prefer illegal taxi operations, citing that they are more available, convenient, and fairly priced.

== Traded goods and services ==
Some examples of underground economic activities include:

=== Prostitution ===
Prostitution is illegal or highly regulated in some countries. This demonstrates the underground economy, because of consistent high demand from customers, relatively high pay, but labor-intensive and low-skilled work, which attracts a continual supply of workers. While prostitution exists in every country, studies show that it tends to flourish more in poorer countries, and in areas with large numbers of unattached men, such as around military bases. For instance, an empirical study showed that the supply of prostitutes rose abruptly in Denver and Minneapolis in 2008 when the Democratic and Republican National Conventions took place there.

Prostitutes in the black market generally operate with some degree of secrecy, sometimes negotiating prices and activities through codewords and subtle gestures. In countries such as Germany or the Netherlands, where prostitution is legal but regulated, illegal prostitutes exist whose services are offered more cheaply without regard for the legal requirements or procedures—health checks, standards of accommodation, and so on.

=== Personal information ===
Personally identifying information, financial information like credit card and bank account information, and medical data are bought and sold, mostly in darknet markets. People increase the value of the stolen data by aggregating it with publicly available data, and selling it again for a profit, increasing the damage that can be done to the people whose data was stolen.

=== Illegal drugs ===
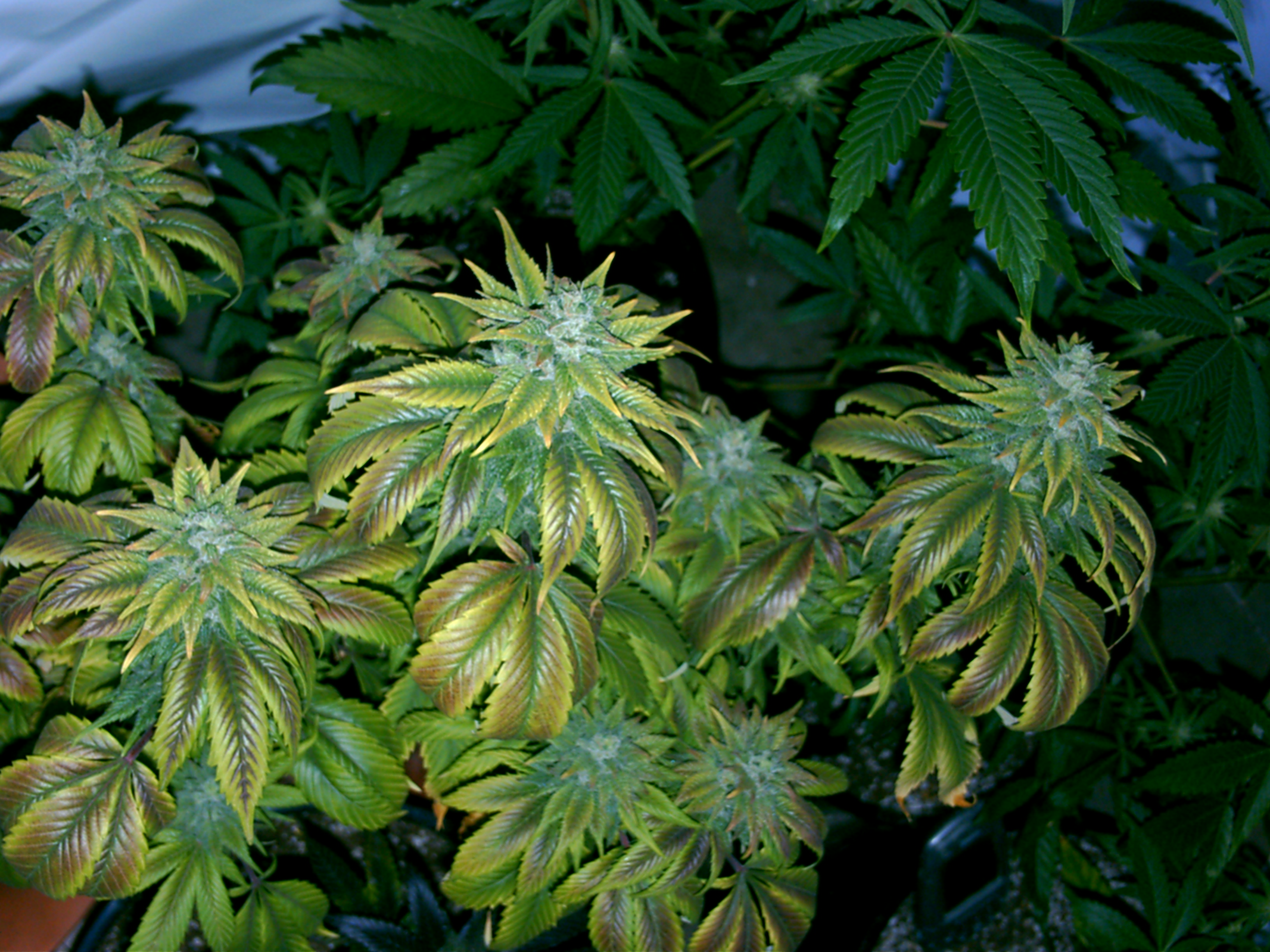
In the U.S., cannabis has been termed as a cash crop.

From the late 19th and early 20th centuries, many countries began to ban the possession or use of some recreational drugs, such as in the United States' war on drugs. Many people nonetheless continue to use illegal drugs, and a black market exists to supply them. Despite law enforcement efforts to intercept them, demand remains high, providing a large profit motive for organized criminal groups to keep drugs supplied. The United Nations has reported that the retail market value of illegal drugs is $530 billion.

Although law enforcement agencies intercept a fraction of drug traffickers and incarcerate thousands of wholesale and retail sellers and users, the demand for such drugs and profit margins encourage new distributors to enter the market. Drug legalization activists draw parallels between the illegal drug trade and the Prohibition of alcohol in the United States in the 1920s.

=== Weapons ===
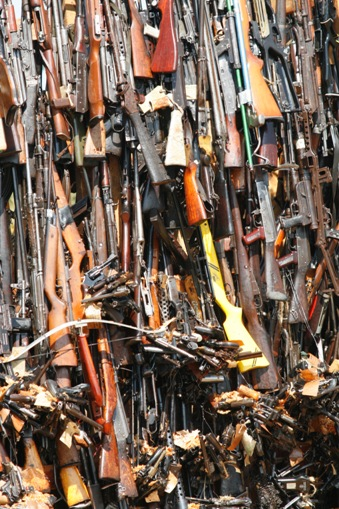
A tower of confiscated smuggled weapons about to be incinerated in Nairobi, Kenya

The laws of many countries forbid or restrict the personal ownership of weapons. These restrictions can range from small knives to firearms, either altogether or by classification (e.g., caliber, handguns, automatic weapons, and explosives). The black market supplies the demands for weaponry that cannot be obtained legally or may only be obtained legally after obtaining permits and paying fees. This may be by smuggling the arms from countries where they were bought legally or stolen, or by stealing from arms manufacturers within the country itself, using insiders. In cases where the underground economy is unable to smuggle firearms, they can also satisfy requests by gunsmithing their own firearms. Those who may buy this way include criminals to use for illegal activities, gun collectors, and otherwise law-abiding citizens interested in protecting their dwellings, families, or businesses.

In England and Wales, certain categories of weapons used for hunting may be owned by qualified residents but must be registered with the local police force and kept within a locked cabinet. Among those who may purchase weapons on the black market are people who are unable to pass the legal requirements for registration—convicted felons or those suffering from mental illness for example.

=== Illegally logged timber ===
The illegal logging of timber, according to Interpol, is an industry worth almost as much as the drug production industry in some countries.

=== Animals and animal products ===
In many developing countries, living animals are captured in the wild and sold as pets. Wild animals are also hunted and killed for their meat, hide, and organs, the latter of which and other animal parts are sold for use in traditional medicine.

In several states in the United States, laws requiring the pasteurization of milk have created black markets in raw milk, and sometimes in raw milk cheese which is legal in a number of EU countries but banned in the U.S. if aged less than 60 days.

=== Alcohol ===
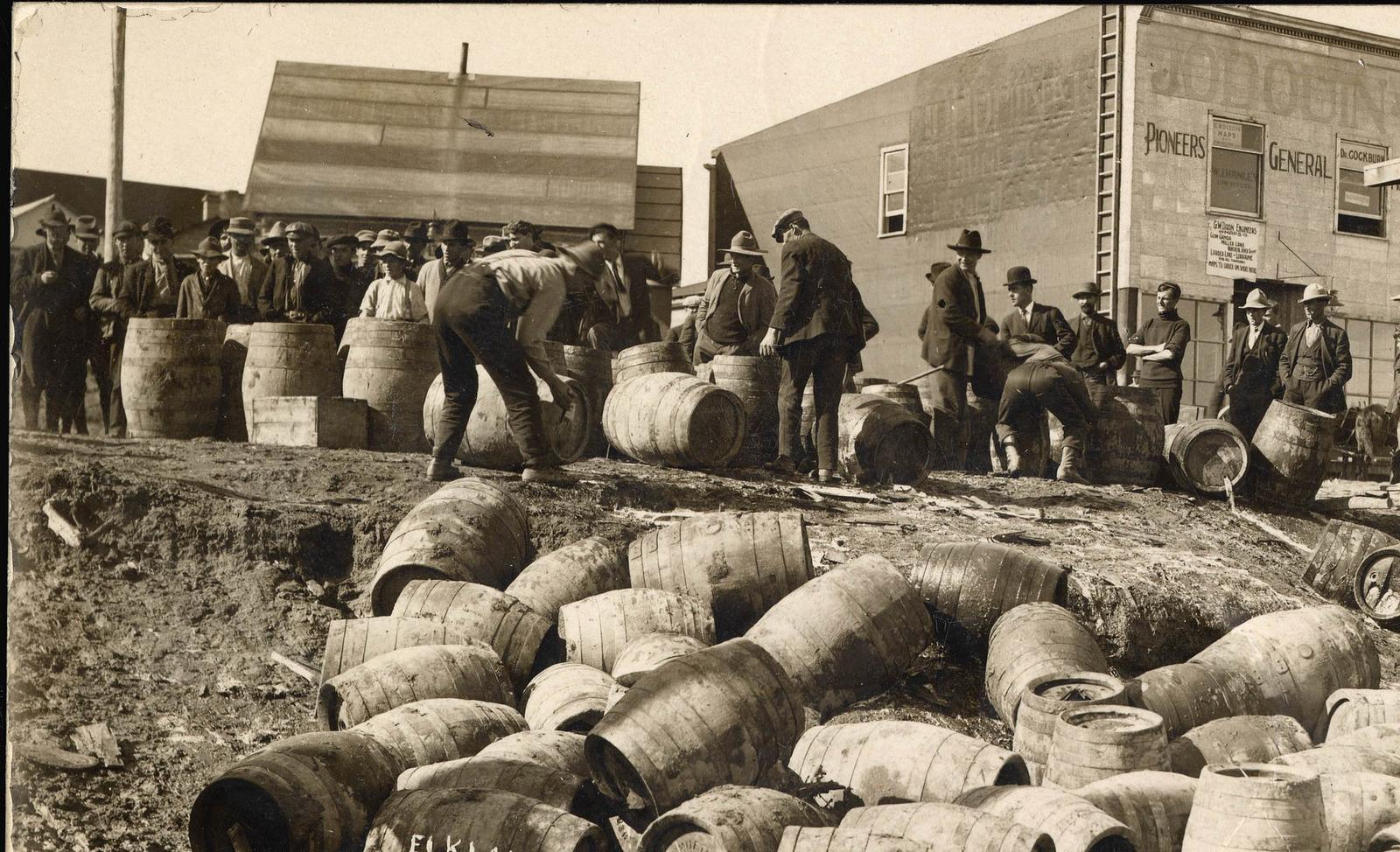
Broken barrels of liquor after a police raid in 1925, in Elk Lake, Ontario

Rum-running, or bootlegging, is the illegal business of transporting (smuggling) alcoholic beverages where such transportation is forbidden by law. Smuggling is usually done to circumvent taxation or prohibition laws. The term rum-running is more commonly applied to smuggling over water; bootlegging is applied to smuggling over land. According to the PBS documentary Prohibition, the term "bootlegging" was popularized when thousands of city dwellers would sell liquor from flasks they kept in their bootleg all across major cities and rural areas. The term "rum-running" most likely originated at the start of Prohibition in the United States (1920–1933), when ships from Bimini in the western Bahamas transported cheap Caribbean rum to Florida speakeasies. Rum's cheapness made it a low-profit item for the rumrunners, and they moved on to smuggling Canadian whisky, French champagne, and English gin to major cities like New York City and Boston, where prices ran high. It was said that some ships carried $200,000 (roughly equivalent to US$4.5 million in 2022) in contraband in a single run.

=== Tobacco ===
==== United Kingdom ====
The United Kingdom has some of the highest taxes on tobacco products in the world and strict limits on the amount of tobacco that can be imported duty-free from other countries, leading to widespread attempts to smuggle relatively cheap tobacco from low tax countries into the U.K. Such smuggling efforts range from vacationers concealing relatively small quantities of tobacco in their luggage to large-scale enterprises linked to organized crime. British authorities have aggressively tried to detect and confiscate such illegal imports, and to prosecute those caught. Nevertheless, it has been reported that "27% of cigarettes and 68% of roll your own tobacco is purchased on the black market".

==== United States ====
Smuggling one truckload of cigarettes from a low-tax U.S. state to a high-tax state can result in a profit of up to $3 million. Because traffic crossing U.S. state borders is not usually stopped or inspected to the same extent as happens at the country's international borders, interdicting this sort of smuggling (especially without causing major disruption to interstate commerce) is difficult. Low-tax states are generally the major tobacco producers and have come under criticism for their reluctance to increase taxes. North Carolina eventually agreed to raise its taxes from 5 cents to 35 cents per pack of 20 cigarettes, although this remains far below the national average. As of 2010, South Carolina has refused to follow suit and raise taxes from seven cents per pack (the lowest in the USA).

=== Biological organs ===
According to the World Health Organization (WHO), illegal organ trade occurs when organs are removed from the body for the purpose of commercial transactions. The WHO justifies its stance on the issue by stating, "Payment for... organs is likely to take unfair advantage of the poorest and most vulnerable groups, undermines altruistic donation and leads to profiteering and human trafficking." Despite prohibitions, it was estimated that 5% of all organ recipients engaged in commercial organ transplant in 2005. Research indicates that illegal organ trade is on the rise, with a recent report by Global Financial Integrity estimating that the illegal organ trade generates profits between $600 million and $1.2 billion per year across many countries.

=== Racketeering ===
A racket is a service that is fraudulently offered to solve a problem, such as for a problem that does not actually exist or that would not otherwise exist if the racket did not exist. Conducting a racket is called racketeering. The potential problem may be caused by the same party that offers to solve it, although that fact may be concealed, with the intent to engender continual patronage for the racketeer. An archetype is the protection racket, wherein a person or group (e.g., a criminal gang) indicates to a store owner that they could protect their store from potential damage, damage that the same person or group would otherwise inflict, while the correlation of threat and protection may be more or less deniably veiled, distinguishing it from the more direct act of extortion. Racketeering is often associated with organized crime. The term was coined by the Employers' Association of Chicago in June 1927 in a statement about the influence of organized crime in the Teamsters union.

=== Transportation providers ===
Where taxicabs, buses, and other transportation providers are strictly regulated or monopolized by government, a black market typically flourishes to provide transportation to poorly served or overpriced communities. In the United States, some cities restrict entry to the taxicab market with a medallion system (taxicabs must get a special license and display it on a medallion in the vehicle). In most such jurisdictions it is legal to sell the medallions, but the limited supply and resulting high prices of medallions have led to a market in unlicensed carpooling/illegal taxi operation. In Baltimore, Maryland, for example, it is not uncommon for private individuals to provide illegal taxi operation services for city residents.

=== Housing rental ===
In places where there is rent control and subsidized affordable housing, which provide housing below the market cost, there may be a black market for housing rentals. For instance, in the UK there is illegal subletting of social housing homes where the tenant illegally rents out the government-subsidized home at a higher rent. In Sweden, rental contracts with regulated rent can be bought on the black market, either from the current tenant or sometimes directly from the property owner. Specialized black-market dealers assist the property owners with such transactions.

=== Counterfeit medicine, essential aircraft and automobile parts ===
Items such as medicines as well as essential aircraft and automobile parts (e.g. brakes, motor parts, etc.) are counterfeited on a large scale.

=== Copyrighted media ===
A common explanation for why copyright infringement is not theft is that the original copyright holder still possesses the work they made, unlike the theft of an object.

Copyright holders frequently refer to copyright infringement as theft, "although such misuse has been rejected by legislatures and courts". The slogan "Piracy is theft" was used beginning in the 1980s, and is still being used. In copyright law, infringement does not refer to theft of physical objects that take away the owner's possession, but an instance where a person exercises one of the exclusive rights of the copyright holder without authorization. Courts have distinguished between copyright infringement and theft. For instance, the United States Supreme Court held in Dowling v. United States (1985) that bootleg phonorecords did not constitute stolen property. Instead,

interference with copyright does not easily equate with theft, conversion, or fraud. The Copyright Act even employs a separate term of art to define one who misappropriates a copyright: '[...] an infringer of the copyright.'

The court said that in the case of copyright infringement, the province guaranteed to the copyright holder by copyright law – certain exclusive rights – is invaded, but no control, physical or otherwise, is taken over the copyright, nor is the copyright holder wholly deprived of using the copyrighted work or exercising the exclusive rights held.

=== Currency ===
Money itself may be subject to a black market. Money may be exchangeable for a differing amount of the same currency if it has been acquired illegally and needs to be laundered before the money can be used. Counterfeit money may be sold for a lesser amount of genuine currency.

The rate of exchange between a local and foreign currency may be subject to a black market, often described as a "parallel exchange rate" or similar terms. This may happen for one or more of several reasons:

- The government sets ("pegs") the local currency at some arbitrary level to another currency that does not reflect its true market value. Certain purchases of foreign currency may be permitted at the official rate; otherwise, a less favorable black-market rate applies.
- A government makes it difficult or illegal for its citizens to own much or any foreign currency.
- The government taxes officially exchanging the local currency for another currency, or vice versa.

A government may officially set the rate of exchange of its currency with that of other, "harder" currencies. When it does so, the peg may overvalue the local currency relative to what its market value would be if it were a floating currency. Those in possession of the harder currency, for example expatriate workers, may be able to use the black market to buy the local currency at better exchange rates than they can get officially.

In situations of financial instability and inflation, citizens may substitute a foreign currency for the local currency. The U.S. dollar is viewed as a relatively stable and safe currency and is often used abroad as a second currency. In 2012, US$340 billion, roughly 37 percent of all U.S. currency, were believed to be circulating abroad. The most recent study of the amount of currency held overseas suggests that only 25 percent of U.S. currency was held abroad in 2014. The widespread substitution of U.S. currency for local currency is known as de facto dollarisation and has been observed in transitioning countries such as Cambodia and in some Latin American countries. Some countries, such as Ecuador, abandoned their local currency and used U.S. dollars, essentially for this reason, a process known as de jure dollarization (see also the example of the Ghanaian cedi from the 1970s and 1980s).

If foreign currency is difficult or illegal for local citizens to acquire, they will pay a premium to acquire it. U.S. currency is viewed as a relatively stable store of value and, since it does not leave a paper trail, it is also a convenient medium of exchange for both illegal transactions and for unreported income both in the U.S. and abroad.

More recently cryptocurrencies such as bitcoin have been used as a medium of exchange in black market transactions. Cryptocurrencies are sometimes favored over centralized currency due to their pseudonymous nature and their ability to be traded over the Internet.

=== Fuel ===
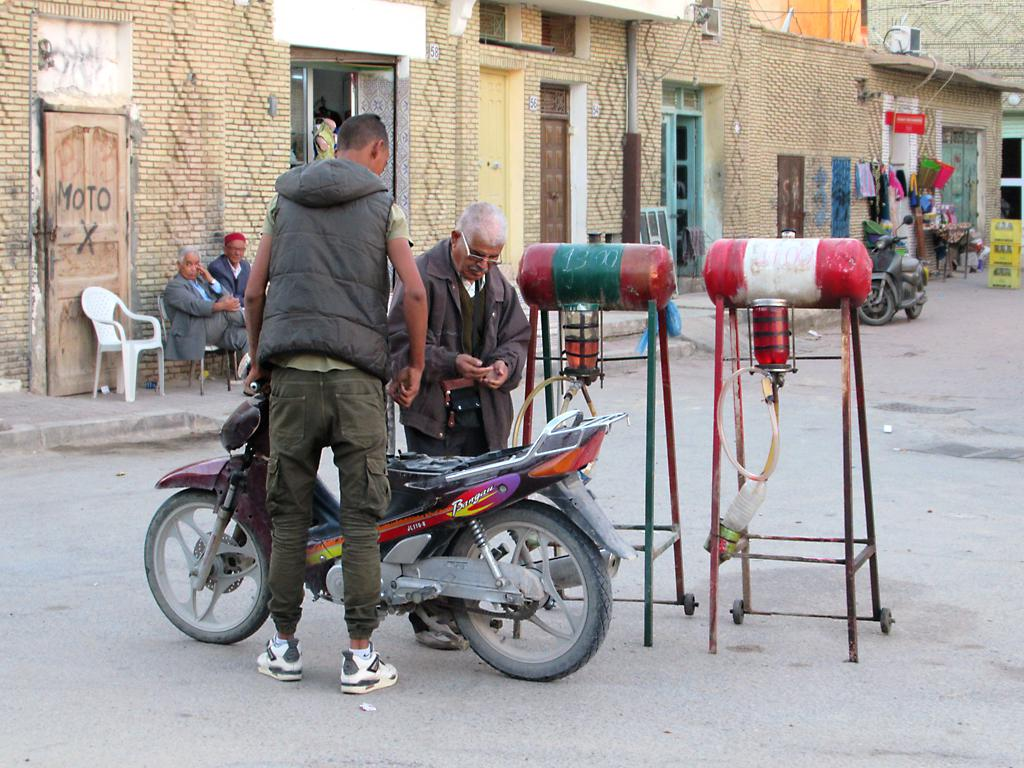
A black-market fuel vendor in Tunisia sells smuggled gasoline to a passerby at a roadside stand.

Within the European single market, it is legal for a person or business to buy fuel in one EU state for use in a vehicle in another, as well as a small amount of fuel in a container, but as with other goods, taxes (such as VAT) will generally be payable by the final customer at the physical place of making the purchase. When fuel is transported across borders for resale, such taxes can often be recovered and then relevant taxes are payable in the country of sale, but there are no customs checks on borders between countries within the European Union Customs Union. Differences in tax rates can thus lead to opportunities for arbitrage even when prices before tax are equal, in a form that is illegal as a form of tax evasion.

For example, between the Republic of Ireland and Northern Ireland, there has often been a black market for petrol and diesel. The direction of smuggling can change depending on variation in the taxes and the exchange rate between the Republic's euro (and previously punt) and Northern Ireland's pound sterling; indeed sometimes diesel will be smuggled in one direction and petrol the other.

In some countries, diesel fuel for agricultural vehicles or domestic use is taxed at a much lower rate than that for other vehicles. This is known as dyed fuel, because a colored dye is added so it can be detected if used in other vehicles (e.g. a red dye in the UK, a green dye in Ireland). The saving is attractive enough to make for a black market in agricultural diesel, which was estimated in 2007 to cost the UK £350 million annually in lost tax.

In countries including India and Nepal, the price of fuel is set by the government, and it is illegal to sell the fuel at a higher price. During the petrol crisis in Nepal, black marketing in fuel became common, especially during mass petrol shortage. At times, people queued for hours or even overnight to get fuel. Petrol pump operators were alleged to hoard the fuel and sell it to black marketeers. Black marketing in vehicle/cooking fuel became widespread during the 2015 Nepal blockade; even after it was eased and petrol imports resumed, people were not getting the fuel as intended and resorted to the black market.

=== Sex toys ===
In some countries including Saudi Arabia, Thailand, and India sex toys are illegal, and are sold illegally, without compliance with regulations on safety, etc. Platforms used to sell sex toys on the black market include consumer-to-consumer online auction websites and private pages on social media websites. In black market venues in Cambodia, sex toys have been seized alongside aphrodisiac products. It has been suggested that if efforts in North America to ban realistic looking sexbots succeed, it may result in a black market.

== Organized crime ==
People engaged in the black market may run their business hidden behind a front business that is not illegal.

Often certain types of illegal products are traded for each other, depending on the geographical location.

== Causes ==
=== Wars ===
Black markets flourish during wartime. States engaged in total war or other large-scale, extended wars often impose restrictions on the use of critical resources that are needed for the war effort, such as food, gasoline, rubber, metal, etc., typically through rationing. A black market then develops to supply rationed goods at exorbitant prices. The rationing and price controls enforced in many countries during World War II encouraged widespread black market activity. One source of black-market meat under wartime rationing was farmers declaring fewer domestic animal births to the Ministry of Food than had actually happened. Another in Britain was supplies from the U.S., intended only for use on U.S. army bases on British land, but leaked into the local native British black market.

For example, in the Parliament of the United Kingdom on February 17, 1945, members said that "the whole turkey production of East Anglia had gone to the black market" and "prosecutions [for black-marketing] were like trying to stop a leak in a battleship", and it was said that official prices of such foods were set so low that their producers often sold their produce on the black market for higher prices; one such route (seen to operate at the market at Diss, Norfolk) was to sell live poultry to members of the public; each purchaser would sign a form promising that he was buying the birds to breed from, but then take them home for eating.

During the Vietnam War, American soldiers would spend Military Payment Certificates on maid service and sexual entertainment. Also if a Vietnamese civilian wanted something that was hard to get, he would buy it at double the price from one of the soldiers, who had a monthly ration card and thus had access to the military stores. The transactions ran through the on-base maids to the local populace. Although these activities were illegal, only flagrant or large-scale black marketeers were prosecuted by the military.

=== Laws and regulations ===
A classic example of new regulation creating a black market is the prohibition of alcohol. When such a law disappears, so does the black market. Sin taxes – taxes levied on products deemed harmful such as alcohol and tobacco – may increase the black market supply. One argument for legalizing marijuana is the elimination of the black market, and taxes from that economy becoming available for the government.

== See also ==
- Agorism
- Black hat
- Black market in wartime France
- Business ethics
- Counter-economics
- Darknet market
- Dog fighting
- Drug cartel
- Grey market
- Household electricity approach
- Hunger's Rogues
- Illicit trade
- Indian black money
- Informal economy
- Jangmadang
- Koutouki
- The Misfit Economy
- Repugnant market
- Theft
- Tobacco
- Unreported employment
- Wide boy
