= Kenneth Geller =

American lawyer

Kenneth Steven Geller
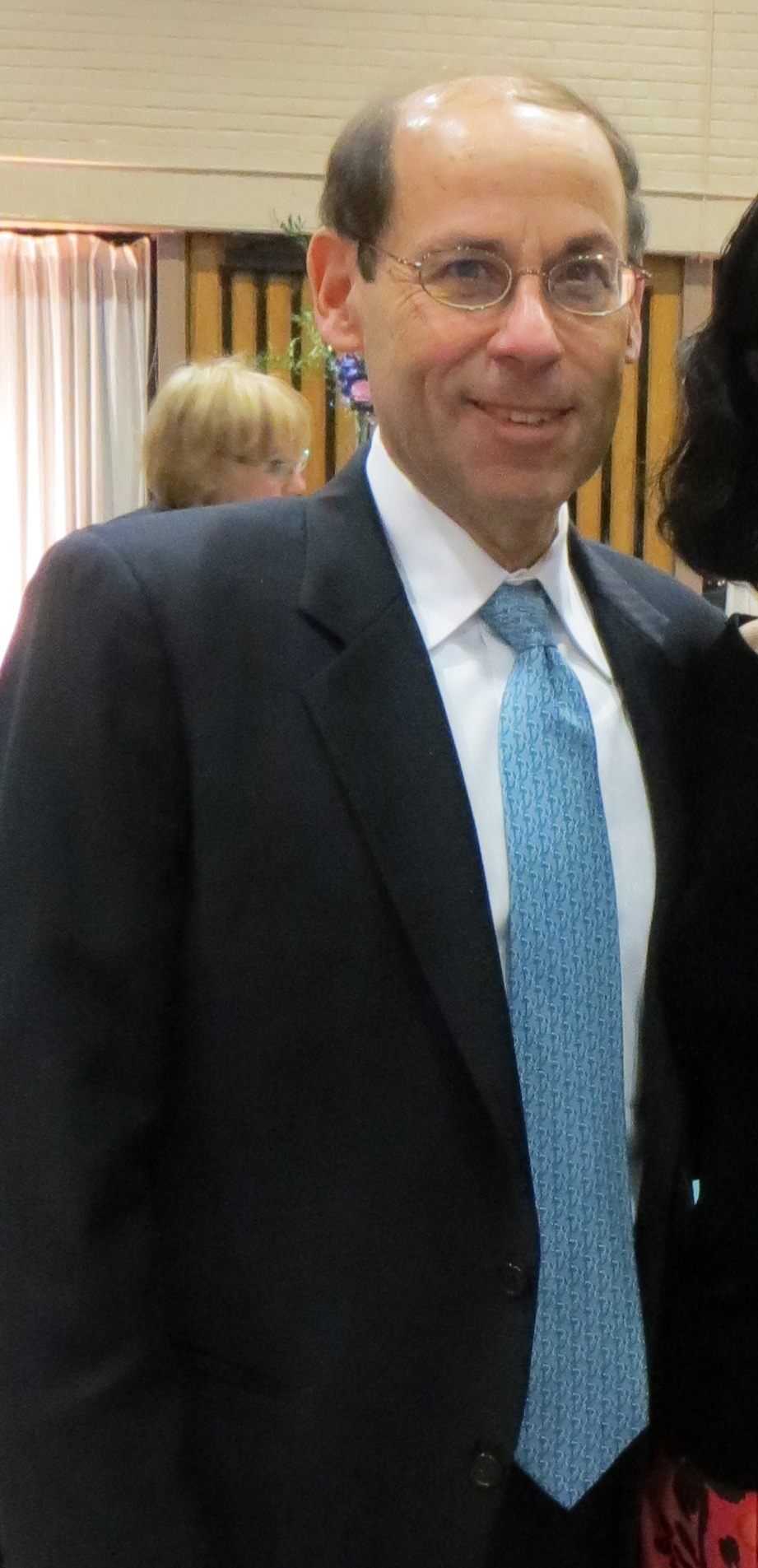
- Geller at a social event in December 2012
- Born: September 22, 1947 (age 78); New York City
- Occupation: Managing Partner of Mayer Brown

Kenneth Steven Geller (born September 22, 1947) is a former managing partner of the global law firm Mayer Brown LLP. Prior to that, he served as Deputy Solicitor General of the United States and as an Assistant Special Prosecutor in the Watergate Special Prosecution Force.

== Career ==
After graduating from Harvard Law School, magna cum laude, in 1971, where he served as an editor of the Harvard Law Review, Geller worked as Law Clerk to the Honorable Walter R. Mansfield, United States Court of Appeals for the Second Circuit. Between 1973 and 1975, he served on the federal government's Watergate Special Prosecution Force as an Assistant Special Prosecutor. In that position, Geller participated in criminal investigations, grand jury proceedings, and appeals and took the deposition of President Richard Nixon in San Clemente, California, in February 1975.

Geller then joined the Office of the Solicitor General in the United States Department of Justice, serving from 1975 to 1979 as Assistant to the Solicitor General and from 1979 to 1986 as Deputy Solicitor General under Solicitors General Robert Bork, Wade McCree, Rex Lee, and Charles Fried. In 1983, while serving as Deputy Solicitor General, Geller received the Presidential Rank Award for Distinguished Executive Service from President Ronald Reagan. As Deputy Solicitor General, Geller handled the federal government's civil litigation in the Supreme Court and argued numerous cases involving, among other subjects, the civil liability of federal officials, judicial review of administrative action, the Freedom of Information Act and the Federal Tort Claims Act.

In 1986, Geller joined the law firm Mayer, Brown & Platt as a partner in its Washington, D.C. office. He became a member of the firm's management committee in 1995, was named Vice Chairman in 2007, and became Managing Partner in 2009. Geller also was Partner-in-Charge of Mayer Brown's Washington DC office between 1995 and 2007.

Geller's practice has focused on briefing and arguing cases in the Supreme Court of the United States, federal courts of appeals, and state supreme courts. He has written or edited some 300 Supreme Court briefs and certiorari petitions, argued more than 40 cases before the Supreme Court, and briefed and argued dozens of cases in other state and federal appellate courts. Chambers USA 2007 described Geller as "both incredibly organized and wonderfully clear. He is superb when you need someone to take a highly complex area of law and distill it to its essence." Prior to focusing on his duties as Managing Partner, Geller was named by Chambers USA to the Band 1 in the field of appellate law and was ranked as one of the Benchmark Appellate National and Washington DC Litigation Stars.

Geller is co-author of Supreme Court Practice (11th ed. 2019), as well as the Supreme Court chapters in Business and Commercial Litigation in Federal Courts (4th ed. 2015) and Federal Appellate Practice (5th ed. 2021). He is particularly experienced in the areas of federal preemption of state law and constitutional law.

Geller has served on the Advisory Rules Committees of the District of Columbia Circuit, including two years as Chairman, and of the United States Court of Appeals for the Armed Forces. In addition, Geller has been active for more than 25 years in the Supreme Court Historical Society, for which he currently serves as a Trustee and has served as Chairman of the Program Committee and the Publications Committee. Geller also is a member of the case selection committee of the Product Liability Advisory Council, Inc. Geller has been a frequent speaker at conferences on appellate advocacy, Supreme Court practice, and product liability law.

In 2020, President Joe Biden's Supreme Court reform commission asked Geller to assemble and chair a group of experienced Supreme Court practitioners to advise the commission on its proposals for Court reform. In July 2021, Geller and his co-chair, Maureen Mahoney, presented a written report and oral testimony on reform issues that the commission repeatedly cited in its final report.

== Awards and commendations ==
In 1983, Geller received the Presidential Rank Award for Distinguished Executive in the Senior Executive Service for his work in law.

The 2004 edition of Chambers USA put him at the top of its list, "America's Leading Lawyers for Business."

Chambers USA again commended Geller in 2006, calling him "a standout lawyer in a very talented group" and "extremely experienced and seasoned, with superb judgment." In 2007, Chambers USA described Geller as "both incredibly organized and wonderfully clear. He is superb when you need someone to take a highly complex area of law and distill it to its essence."

== Education ==
Geller attended the Bronx High School of Science and the City College of New York and graduated magna cum laude with a BA in 1968. He graduated magna cum laude with a JD from Harvard Law School in 1971.

== Personal life ==
Geller lives in Chevy Chase, Maryland. He is married to Judith Ratner, a pediatrician. They have two children — Eric, a journalist, and Lisa, a public health researcher — and a golden retriever named Millie.
