= Mayer Brown =

American law firm

- No. of offices: 22 total
- Offices: 71 South Wacker, Chicago, Illinois, United States
- No. of lawyers: More than 1,700 (2026)
- Major practice areas: Litigation, capital markets, real estate, fund formation, finance
- Key people: Jon Van Gorp (chairman); Jeremy Clay (managing partner)
- Revenue: ▲$2.171 billion (2026)
- Date founded: 1881 (145 years old)
- Founder: Adolf Kraus; Levy Mayer
- Company type: Limited liability partnership
- Website: mayerbrown.com

Mayer Brown is a global white-shoe law firm, founded in Chicago, Illinois, United States. It has offices in 22 cities in 10 countries throughout the Americas, Asia, Europe, and the Middle East, with its largest offices being in Chicago, Washington, D.C., New York City, and London.

== History ==
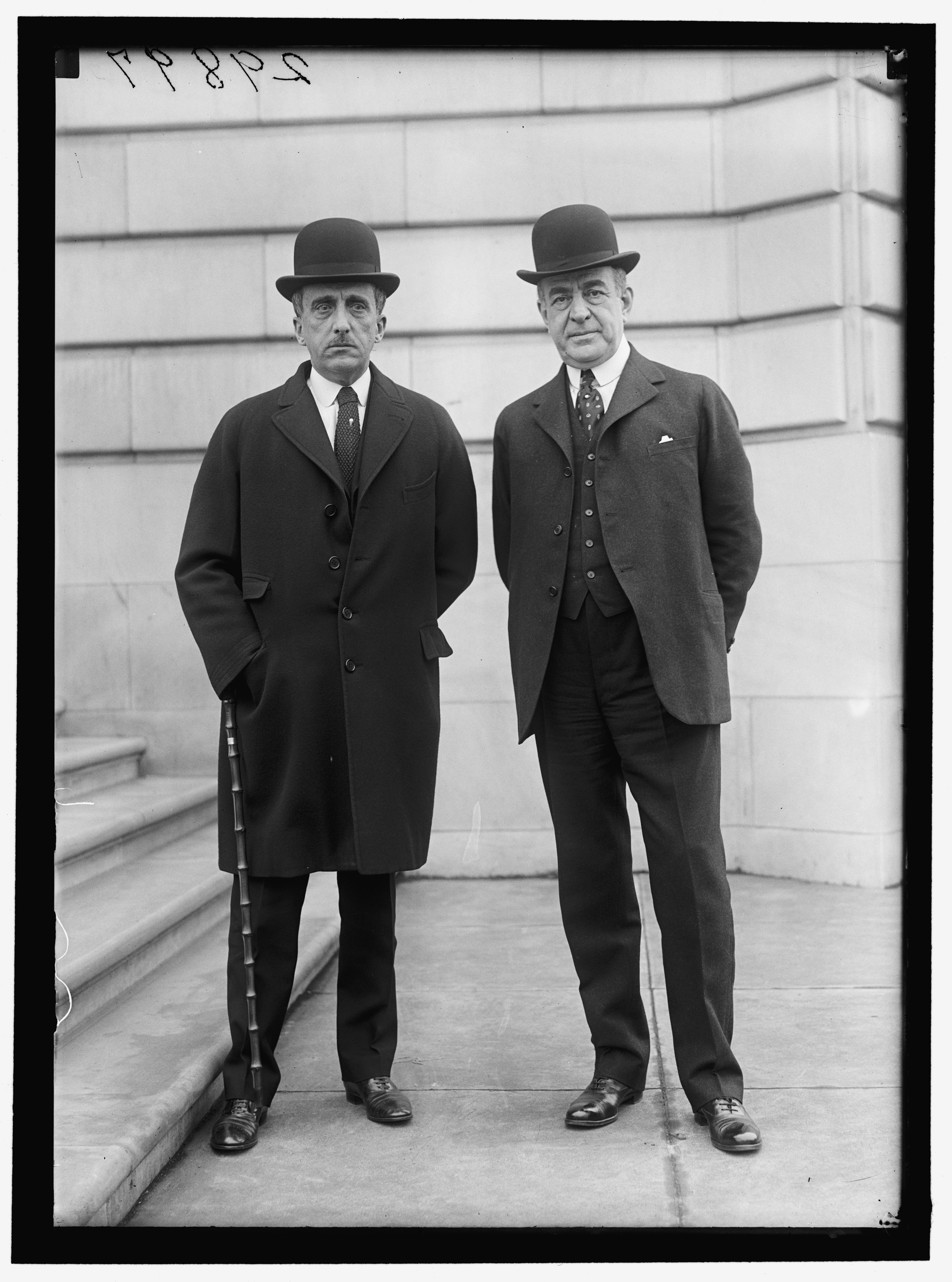
American meatpacking magnate J. Ogden Armour, left, with attorney Levy Mayer at the U.S. Capitol in Washington D.C., 1918

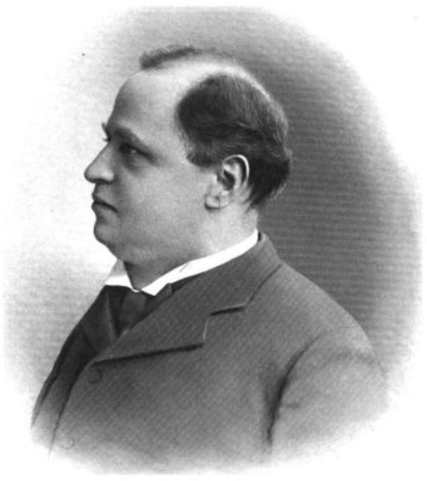
Adolf Kraus, lawyer and co-founder of Mayer Brown

The two firms that now form the core of Mayer Brown were both founded in the 19th century. The US portion of the firm was founded in 1881 in Chicago, by Adolf Kraus and Levy Mayer, and was shortly thereafter known as Kraus, Mayer & Brackett. Among its earliest clients was retail giant Sears Roebuck and Co. After several changes in name to reflect its growing membership, the firm eventually became known in the US as Mayer, Brown & Platt.

In 2002, the firm merged with British law firm Rowe & Maw, which was established in 1895 in London, and operated under that name until joining with Mayer, Brown & Platt in 2002 to form Mayer, Brown, Rowe & Maw. In 2007, the amalgamated firm shortened its name to Mayer Brown.

In 2008, Mayer Brown combined with Johnson Stokes & Master (JSM), establishing an Asia office to be known as Mayer Brown JSM. In 2024, amid US-China tensions and subsequent to the Pillar of Shame incident, the firm reorganized its Asia presence to split from its mainland China operations, and saw JSM revert to its pre-merger partnership as an independent law firm headquartered in Hong Kong with offices in Shanghai and Beijing. It is unclear which partnership - JSM or Mayer Brown - tabled the separation, but the proposition to split was reported to have been tabled mere weeks before JSM's 160th anniversary in 2023.

In 2009, the firm formed an association with Brazil's Tauil & Chequer Advogados. In October 2022, the firm launched its own joint law venture with Singapore law firm PK Wong & Nair LLC, known as Mayer Brown PK Wong & Nair PTE. Ltd.

== Pro bono work ==
Mayer Brown is a signatory to the Pro Bono Institute's Law Firm Pro Bono Challenge, which commits the firm to devote 3 percent of total billable time to pro bono work, and a member of the UK Joint Protocol on Pro Bono Work, which stipulates that pro bono legal work must be carried out to the same standard as chargeable work. The firm is also a signatory top the Pro Bono Declaration of the Americas.

Partner John F. Halbleib represented the Milton Hershey School on a pro bono basis from 1998 to 2002.

In 2001, lawyer Lee Rubin represented the National Security Archives in an effort by the U.S. State Department to recover 10,000 pages of transcripts of telephone conversations from former Secretary of State Henry Kissinger.

Ward Johnson, a managing partner in the firm’s Northern California office, secured the release of Ken Oliver, who had been convicted in 1997 to life in prison under California’s "three strikes" law. Oliver spent 23 years in prison before Johnson secured his release in 2017 along with a $125,000 settlement for violating Oliver’s civil rights.

Attorney Brian Netter spent four years working pro bono to have the District of Columbia’s budget freed from federal control in a case tied to the 2012 Budget Autonomy Act.

Partner Marcia Maack, the director of pro-bono activities for the firm, helped secure a special immigrant visa in 2017 for an interpreter who had served American forces in Iraq.

In 2017 attorney Andrew Pincus represented the city of Seattle in a pro bono lawsuit challenging the Trump administration’s threats against sanctuary cities that refused to aid in federal immigration crackdowns. That same year, Pincus and others represented two Yemeni men who had been detained at Dulles International Airport in Washington, D.C. after Trump signed the first ban on travelers from seven majority Muslim countries.

Partners Nicole Saharsky, Michael Scodro and Marcia Goodman along with associates Minh Nguyen-Dang and Carmen Longoria-Green, obtained a landmark settlement for the players on the US Women’s National Soccer Team (USWNT) in their 2019 equal-pay lawsuit against the US Soccer Federation (USSF). The parties agreed to settle for $24 million in backpay damages and a guarantee of equal pay going forward for all games, including for the World Cup. This is the first commitment from a major US sports federation to pay female and male athletes equally.

In 2019, Mayer Brown obtained a nationwide injunction against the US government and its decision to terminate temporary protected status for 60,000 Haitians.

Attorneys Matthew Ingber, Christopher Mikesh, and Justin Perkins secured asylum in the United States for a 12-year old Nigerian chess prodigy and his family, which has allowed him to compete in international chess tournaments, setting a new record in the game.

Attorneys from Mayer Brown represented a group of migrants in 2021 and successfully argued that asylum seekers coming to U.S. ports of entry have rights under U.S. law that cannot be denied by preventing them from physically crossing the border. In 2024, the Ninth Circuit largely affirmed the District Court’s opinion, including the precedent that the government’s duty applies even to asylum seekers who have not yet reached a port of entry due to the government’s unlawful turnbacks. The decision was overturned by the U.S. Supreme Court in the spring of 2026.

Beginning in 2021, the firm led a coalition of 20 law firms and corporate legal departments working to evacuate nearly 150 Asian University for Women (AUW) students in Afghanistan and place them at universities throughout the U.S. to continue their studies. Mayer Brown then led a coalition of 20 law firms and corporate legal departments to help the students apply for asylum. By March 2024, all the represented students had been granted asylum in the United States and the coalition is now working to help them obtain legal permanent residency.

In 2021, Mayer Brown worked with the Washington Lawyers' Committee and Disability Rights Maryland to sue on behalf of a man who was beaten by Maryland sheriff's deputies during a mental health crisis. The team obtained a substantial settlement payment for the man as well as a series of policy changes in the county sheriff's office.

Attorneys for Mayer Brown worked with the Anti-Defamation League (ADL) in 2024 to resolve a discrimination case against the School District of Philadelphia addressing repeated incidents of antisemitic harassment, bullying, and discrimination. In 2025, the firm worked with the ADL and the Louis D. Brandeis Center for Human Rights Under Law, on a separate matter pertaining to antisemitic incidents at Concord-Carlisle High School.

== Recognition ==
- Bloomberg's Leading Law Firms Survey, 2025, top 10
- Financial Times Innovative Lawyers Awards, Europe 2025, most immovative in sustainability
- Law360 Practice Group of the Year 2025 for banking
- Law360 Illinois Powerhouse, 2025
- GlobalCapital 2025, U.S. Securitization Awards, America's Law Firm of the Year (Overall)
- GlobalCapital 2025, Global Americas Derivatives Awards, and U.S. Law firm of the Year
- Finance Asia Achievement Awards 2024, Best Law Firm (Asia Pacific) and "Best Bond Deal (Indonesia)
- Legal 500 Asia Pacific 2023: ranked in 40 practice categories.
- 2023 City Bar Justice Center Award for commitment to promoting racial, social, and economic justice through philanthropy and pro bono legal work
- IFLR Asia Pacific Awards 2021: "Financial Services Regulatory Team of the Year" and "High-Yield Deal of the Year" Awards
- Received a perfect score on the Human Rights Campaign Foundation's Corporate Equality Index 2021.
- 2020 Asia IP Awards: "Hong Kong Copyright Law Firm of the Year"
- The Law Society of Hong Kong's 2020 Pro Bono and Community Service Award: "Distinguished Pro Bono Law Firm Award" and "Silver Law Firm Award for Pro Bono"

== Notable lawyers and alumni ==
- Kenneth D. Bell - judge of the United States District Court for the Western District of North Carolina
- Richard Ben-Veniste - Watergate prosecutor and member of the 9/11 Commission
- Peter Beyer - German politician and member of the Bundestag
- Neil Bluhm - businessman and casino owner
- Günter Burghardt - former European Union ambassador to the United States
- Lawrence A. Cunningham - author and professor of Law at the George Washington University Law School
- William M. Daley - White House chief of staff under President Barack Obama
- Rajesh De - member of the 9/11 Commission and general counsel of the U.S. National Security Agency
- Julian Dibbell - author and technology journalist
- Thomas M. Durkin - judge of the United States District Court for the Northern District of Illinois
- Tyrone C. Fahner - former Illinois attorney general
- Gary Feinerman - former judge of the United States District Court for the Northern District of Illinois
- Kenneth Geller - former deputy solicitor general of the United States, former assistant special prosecutor in the Watergate Special Prosecution Force
- Mark Gitenstein - U.S. ambassador to the European Union
- Joseph Robert Goeke - senior judge of the United States Tax Court
- Hector Gonzalez - judge of the United States District Court for the Eastern District of New York
- Robert Hertzberg - member of the California State Senate and speaker of the California Assembly
- Mickey Kantor - U.S. secretary of commerce and U.S. trade representative
- Leo Katz - professor of Law at the University of Pennsylvania Law School
- Adolf Kraus - founding partner in the law firm of Kraus and Mayer
- Lori Lightfoot - 56th mayor of Chicago
- Levy Mayer - co-founder of Mayer Brown, known for defending large corporations against anti-trust litigation
- David M. McIntosh - co-founder of Federalist Society and Club for Growth
- Friedrich Merz - current chancellor of Germany
- Toby Moffett - former U.S. congressman from Connecticut
- Richard T. Morrison - judge of the United States Tax Court
- Tom Perez - politician and former secretary of labor
- Michael Punke - author, former deputy United States trade representative and U.S. ambassador to the World Trade Organization
- Carl Risch - former U.S. assistant secretary of state for consular affairs
- Andrew H. Schapiro - former U.S. ambassador to the Czech Republic
- Rebekah Scheinfeld - commissioner of the Chicago Department of Transportation (CDOT)
- John Schmidt - former U.S. associate attorney general
- Susan Schwab - former United States trade representative
- Vijay Shanker - judge of the District of Columbia Court of Appeals
- Nathan Simington - commissioner of the U.S. Federal Communications Commission (FCC)
- Adlai Stevenson III - U.S. senator from Illinois
- John J. Sullivan - former U.S. ambassador to Russia and U.S. deputy secretary of state
- John Tharp - U.S. district judge
- Kenneth L. Wainstein - former leader of the U.S. Department of Homeland Security's intelligence office

== Significant matters ==
Mayer Brown advised Chevron Argentina S.R.L. on its participation in a $3 billion crude oil export pipeline project.

The firm advised Nippon Life Insurance Company on its $8.2 billion acquisition of Resolution Life, a global life and annuity insurance group.

The firm advised Ford Pension Schemes on £4.6 billion buy-in with Legal & General in 2025

The firm advised Standard Chartered Bank on the establishment of a $3 billion clean energy infrastructure CLO platform with Apollo

Mayer Brown represented AT&T before the U.S. Supreme Court in AT&T Mobility v. Concepcion.

In Credit Suisse First Boston Ltd. v. Billing, the firm represented Credit Suisse in a precedent-setting case which determined that banks and mutual funds could not be sued under antitrust law over stock losses.

The firm represented Phillip Morris USA before the U.S. Supreme Court in Philip Morris USA v. Williams which held that a jury may not punish a defendant for injuries suffered by non-parties.

Mayer Brown represented Spokeo before the U.S. Supreme Court in Spokeo v. Robbins, a 2015 case with broad implications for class action suits.

During the COVID-19 pandemic, the firm advised Goldman Sachs Lending Partners LLC on a $6.8 billion financing for United Airlines MileagePlus loyalty program.

Mayer Brown helped Citibank recover $500 million in mistakenly wired funds in a multi-year case that was resolved in 2022.

The firm represented Nestle in a $7.15 billion agreement with Starbucks Corporation for the perpetual marketing and distribution rights of products including Starbucks, Seattle's Best Coffee, Starbucks Reserve, Teavana, Starbucks VIA and Torrefazione Italia. The transaction was noted for its importance in expanding the business reach of both companies.

== Role in Refco Inc. collapse ==
Refco was a New York-based broker of commodities and futures contracts. In 2005, the company filed for bankruptcy after significant evidence of accounting fraud surfaced. In the wake of the collapse, a lawsuit was filed in 2007 against Mayer Brown and one of its partners, Joseph Collins. In November 2012, Collins was found guilty on multiple charges of conspiracy and fraud for his role in preparing Refco's IPO. Mayer Brown agreed to pay an undisclosed sum to settle legal claims that it "aided a $1.5 billion fraud scheme that produced a flurry of criminal convictions.”

== Role in the removal of a Tiananmen Square massacre statue ==
In October 2021, Mayer Brown was hired by the University of Hong Kong to help remove a statue memorialising the victims of the 1989 Tiananmen Square protests and massacre from its campus. The statue, known as the Pillar of Shame, was on loan from its creator, Danish sculptor Jens Galschiøt, and had been on campus for more than 20 years.

The law firm issued a letter to Hong Kong Alliance, the pro-democracy organization which had erected the statue, on October 7, requesting that the sculpture be removed within one week, advising that it would be deemed abandoned if it remained after October 13. The request to remove the statue attracted global criticism. Danish foreign minister Jeppe Kofod raised the matter with the Chinese government while United States Senator Pat Toomey criticized the removal attempt as an attempt to "rewrite history". Galschiøt, the sculpture's creator, compared the law firm's handling to Italian mafia methods and said, "I believe that Mayer Brown is morally and ethically responsible for helping to destroy the only mark of remembrance of the Tiananmen peace plan that exists on Chinese territory."

In response, the university defended its position by saying that the decision was based on “the latest risk assessment and legal advice”. In a statement, Mayer Brown said, "We were asked to provide a specific service on a real estate matter for our long-term client, the University of Hong Kong... Our legal advice is not intended as commentary on current or historical events." This response prompted the press and activists to draw comparisons with the law firm's reaction following the murder of George Floyd. The firm had issued a statement following Floyd's murder in June 2020, that "as members of the legal community, we bear a special and heightened responsibility. We understand that the rule of law requires that everyone, and especially those in power, be held accountable for their actions."

Two days after the removal deadline set by the law firm, and while the sculpture was still in place despite the deadline having already passed, Mayer Brown confirmed that they would stop representing the university, one of the Mayer Brown legacy firm Johnson Stokes & Master's oldest clients, regarding the sculpture's removal.

The decision to withdraw from representing the university came under heavy fire, with Vice Chairperson of the Chinese People's Political Consultative Conference and former Chief Executive of Hong Kong Leung Chun Ying calling for a China-wide boycott of Mayer Brown. On 2 December 2024, Mayer Brown announced its separation from Johnson Stokes & Master, which it had merged with in 2008. It was reported that the appearance of U.S. political control, manifested in the Pillar of Shame incident, was a notable cause for the decision to separate.
