= Johnson Stokes & Master =

Law firm in Hong Kong established in 1863

Johnson Stokes & Master 孖士打律師行
- Headquarters: Central, Hong Kong
- No. of offices: 4
- No. of attorneys: 120+
- Key people: Geoffrey Chan (senior partner)
- Date founded: 1863
- Founder: Edmund Sharp
- Company type: General partnership
- Website: jsm.com jsm.cn

Johnson Stokes & Master (JSM; Chinese: 孖士打律師行) is one of the oldest and largest law firms in Asia, based in Hong Kong with offices in Shanghai and Beijing. It was founded in Hong Kong in 1863 and became known as Johnson, Stokes and Master in 1890.

Between 2008 and 2024 it merged with United States law firm Mayer Brown to become Mayer Brown's Asia practice, called Mayer Brown JSM (and from 1 September 2018, Mayer Brown). In May 2024, Mayer Brown announced it would separate JSM from Mayer Brown. JSM was resurrected on 2 December 2024 after the de-coupling between Mayer Brown and a majority of partners who had originally joined from JSM. Mayer Brown in Hong Kong split into two Hong Kong firms: Mayer Brown Hong Kong LLP and Johnson Stokes & Master.

JSM has offices in Hong Kong, Shanghai and Beijing, and employs 128 lawyers including 45 partners.

== History ==
Johnson Stokes & Master was established in 1863 in Hong Kong by Edmund Sharp as a sole proprietorship at a time when Hong Kong had less than a dozen practising lawyers. In 1890, the firm changed its name to Johnson, Stokes and Master, from Edmund Sharp & Toller. In 1893, an office was established in Shanghai, China.

In 1895, Alfred Bulmer Johnson became senior partner of the firm with Alfred Stokes and Godfrey Cornewall Chester Master as supporting partners. At that time, JSM was already legal advisor to the Hongkong and Shanghai Banking Corporation, a major commercial establishment in Hong Kong.

On December 1, 1896, Johnson retired from private practice at the firm and also resigned his position of Crown Solicitor, which he had held from 1882. On this occasion, the succession of the Crown Solicitorship was passed not to the firm's next in command — Stokes, who was in Shanghai running the local branch of the firm — but to the next most senior solicitor in the Colony, Henry Lardner Dennys.

In July 1897, JSM engaged the firm's first local born Chinese solicitor — the Oxford-educated Wei Wah-on, son of a compradore of the Chartered Mercantile Bank.

In 1936, JSM moved into the air-conditioned offices of the Hongkong and Shanghai Banking Corporation Building. After the Second World War, JSM resumed business in the Bank Building. Since then, the firm's growth has paralleled Hong Kong's rapid economic development as it expands into other major Asian cities.

=== Merger with Mayer Brown ===
On 28 January 2008 JSM merged with Mayer Brown to become Mayer Brown JSM. Before the merger with Mayer Brown, JSM had offices in Hong Kong, where it was one of the leading law firms, and in Beijing, Guangzhou and Shanghai in mainland China, as well as in Bangkok, Thailand and Hanoi and Ho Chi Minh City, Vietnam. Before the merger, the firm had a team of 800 staff, including more than 260 lawyers. On September 1, 2018, the firm dropped the JSM name and changed its name in Asia to Mayer Brown.

=== De-coupling with Mayer Brown ===
On 2 May 2024, it was announced that JSM would be de-coupling from Mayer Brown, after 15 years, to separate the Hong Kong partnership from the international practices, reverting to its legacy name, Johnson Stokes & Master. Mayer Brown would continue to operate in Hong Kong through a new partnership, focusing on areas of practice aligned with the firm’s strategy internationally and in Asia. JSM will focus on its unique position as a home-grown full-service law firm in Hong Kong. Terence Tung, senior partner of the Hong Kong partnership, said services would continue to be provided through offices in Hong Kong and the mainland.

On December 2, 2024, Mayer Brown Hong Kong split into two Hong Kong firms: Mayer Brown Hong Kong LLP and Johnson Stokes & Master.
