= Robert J. Thorne =

American businessman (1875–1955)

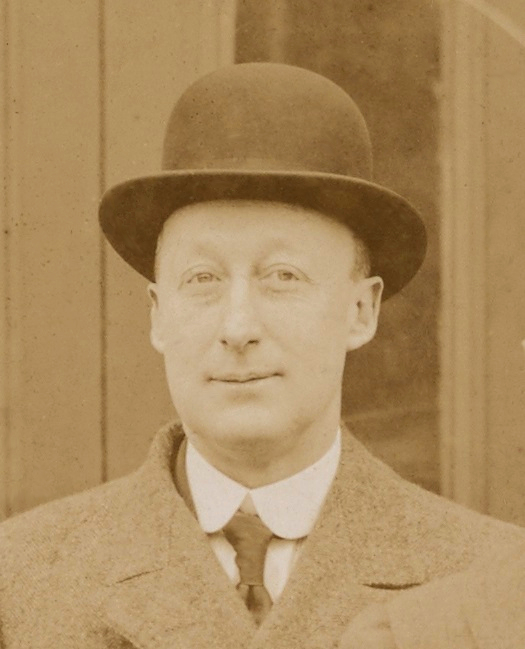
- Robert Thorne in 1918
- Born: Robert Julius Thorne; February 23, 1875
- Died: March 20, 1955 (aged 80)
- Occupation: businessman

Robert Julius Thorne (February 23, 1875 – March 20, 1955) was an American businessman who was president of Montgomery Ward from 1917 to 1920.

== Life ==
Robert Thorne was born in February 1875 in Chicago, Illinois, to George R. Thorne. The senior Thorne was a former major in the Civil War who co-founded Montgomery Ward with his brother-in-law, A. Montgomery Ward.

He received a bachelor's degree from Cornell University in 1897. He was active in the Delta Kappa Epsilon fraternity.

Robert Thorne joined Montgomery Ward's Kansas City, Missouri, branch immediately upon his graduation from Cornell. He rose to become branch manager, and then was transferred to Chicago where he was manager of the store's flagship store and a vice president of the company. In 1917, his older brother and Montgomery Ward president, William C. Thorne, died unexpectedly. Robert J. Thorne assumed the presidency of the company.

Thorne married the former Katherine B. Sterrett. The couple had five daughters: Roberta, Katherine, Laura, Narcissa and Ellen Catherine. His mother-in-law, Catherine Dietrich Willey, died in the sinking of the luxury ocean liner Lusitania in 1915.

=== Employers' Association of Chicago ===
Thorne co-founded the Employers' Association of Chicago in 1902, and played a significant role in the 1905 Chicago Teamsters' strike. He was accused in mid-1905 of bribing transport company owners to lock out their union workers in order to force them to strike.

=== U.S. Army service ===
During World War I, Thorne served as a civilian in the United States Army. He joined the Army on January 1, 1918, as an unpaid volunteer. He was named an assistant to George W. Goethals, Acting Quartermaster General of the Army. Thorne helped to radically reorganize the failing Army logistical and supply system. On March 8, 1918, Goethals named Thorne "Assistant to the Acting Quartermaster General," and issued an order to his troops that all orders from Thorne "will have the force and effect as if performed by the Acting Quartermaster General himself." Thorne left government service after the war ended.

During his tenure with the U.S. Army, Thorne trained Brigadier General Robert E. Wood in logistics. Wood later became vice-president and then chairman of Sears, Roebuck and Company, one of Montgomery Ward's fiercest competitors.

For his work in successfully restructuring the Army's supply system and measurably improving America's warfighting capacity during World War I, Thorne was awarded the Distinguished Service Medal in 1919.

In 1918, Thorne built a 28-room mansion on a 14-acre (57,000 m^{2}) estate on Sheridan Road in Lake Forest, Illinois. The estate, called White Oaks, became a major showcase home in the area. During the 1930s, Thorne became president of the board of trustees of Lake Forest Academy.

== Retirement and death ==
Thorne retired from the presidency of Montgomery Ward in 1920 due to failing health. He and his wife traveled extensively for several years.

In 1942, White Oaks was torn down and the Thornes moved to Coronado, California. In 1950, they moved to La Jolla, California. Thorne died there on March 20, 1955, after a lengthy illness.

Katherine Thorne died in 1963.

== Honors ==
The Robert Julius Thorne Chair in Political Economy in the Department of Economics at Cornell University is endowed in Thorne's name.

A fund at the Delta Chi Chapter of Delta Kappa Epsilon at Cornell was endowed by Thorne, and also carries his name.
