= Wallace Leroy DeWolf =

Wallace Leroy DeWolf (February 24, 1854 – December 25, 1930), sometimes also written as De Wolf, was an American lawyer, businessman, philanthropist, and artist. He was born in Chicago, Illinois, and spent most of his life in the city. Originally a lawyer, DeWolf founded a successful real estate company in 1894. In 1901, he was named the president of the Kellogg Switchboard & Supply Company. His seven-year tenure featured a stock controversy that reached the Illinois Supreme Court and resulted in a large strike.

DeWolf was passionate about the arts, amassing a collection of Anders Zorn works that he donated to the Art Institute of Chicago. DeWolf was an etcher himself, and some of his works were showcased at the Art Institute. A room there was named the DeWolf Gallery of American Landscapes in his honor. DeWolf was also a trustee at the Pasadena Art Institute.

== Biography ==
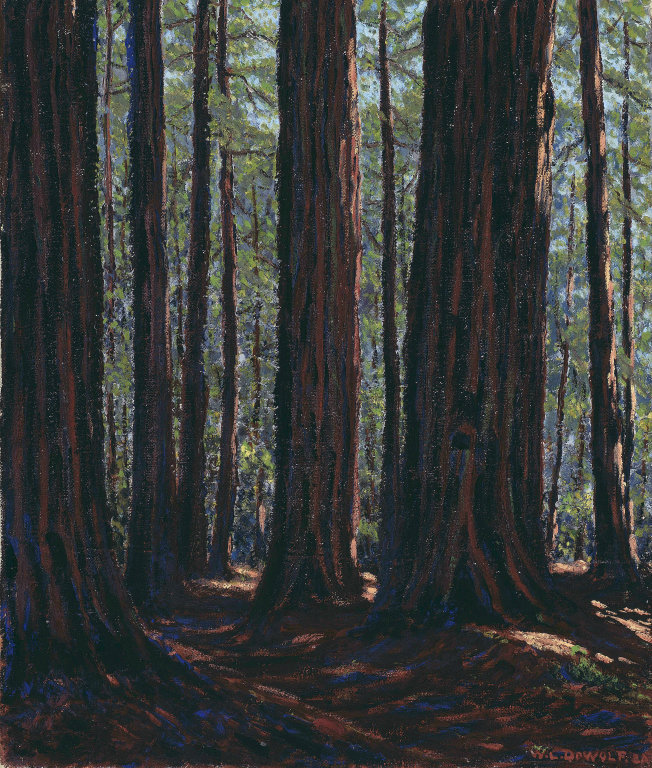
Among the Redwoods, an oil painting by DeWolf in the collection of the Art Institute of Chicago.

Wallace Leroy DeWolf was born on February 24, 1854, in Chicago, Illinois. He was the son of Calvin DeWolf, a prominent lawyer and secretary of the Illinois chapter of the American Anti-Slavery Society. Wallace DeWolf attended Union College of Law at the University of Chicago, graduating with a Bachelor of Laws in 1876. He was admitted to the bar by the Supreme Court of Illinois. DeWolf opened a law office with his father in Chicago.

DeWolf married Mary R. Huntington in Stuttgart, Germany in 1890. Her father was a clerk for the Supreme Court of the United States in Indianapolis, Indiana. In 1894, DeWolf founded W. L. DeWolf & Co., specializing in real estate. The company focused on warehousing and manufacturing. In 1901, DeWolf was named the president of the Kellogg Switchboard & Supply Company, succeeding his brother-in-law Milo G. Kellogg.

DeWolf's tenure at Kellogg was marred by controversy. He secretly attempted to sell company stock to Western Electric, a competing telecommunications company. Milo Kellogg, who had left the company due to his failing health, sued to stop the sale of his stock. The Supreme Court of Illinois sided with Kellogg in Brown v. Cragg and Dunbar v. American Telephone and Telegraph. DeWolf maintained the presidency, however. In 1903, the company became embroiled in a labor dispute, leading to a strike by the Brass Molder's Union Local 83 and the International Brotherhood of Teamsters. DeWolf ended the strike by firing ninety percent of the company workforce. Howard Van Doren Shaw designed a house for DeWolf in Lake Forest, Illinois, in 1904, completed a year later. DeWolf maintained the presidency at the company until 1908.

Art was a lifelong passion for DeWolf. His etching and painting works were exhibited at art galleries, including the Art Institute of Chicago. Chicago mayor Carter Harrison IV named DeWolf to the Commission for Encouragement of Local Art. In 1913, DeWolf donated a collection of 143 etchings by Anders Zorn to the Art Institute. He was the subject of a September 1919 article in the Fine Arts Journal. Thanks to his donations, the Art Institute named one of its rooms the DeWolf Gallery of American Landscapes. DeWolf was a member of the Chicago Society of Etchers and Art Institute of Chicago, and was a trustee of the Pasadena Art Institute in Pasadena, California. He was also the director of the Illinois chapter of the National Audubon Society, vice president of the Union League Club of Chicago, and was a member of the Chicago Historical Society. He was a Republican but did not seek elected office. DeWolf committed suicide by gunshot on December 25, 1930. He had no children.
