= Household electricity approach =

The Household Electricity Approach to measuring the size of the underground economy or black market of a country exploits the presumed relationship between household electrical consumption and a country's GDP. It assumes that undeclared economic activity still needs to use resources, such as electricity, to function. Since electricity consumption is generally well known it can be used as an indicator of economic activity that is not otherwise declared.

The household electricity approach was developed by Maria Lacko as a method to determine the size of the hidden economy in a country. Lacko's primary focus within this approach was directed at the relationship between the household electrical consumption and Gross Domestic Product (GDP) of a country using regression analysis. Her research in this area was particularly focused on developing methodologies that would help to more accurately determine the prevalence of the hidden economy in transitional countries such as the former Soviet bloc countries.

== History ==
Lacko's work received its basis from two other works. The first of these works, developed in 1995, is the method of Dobozi and Pohl. These researchers had suggested that aggregate economic activity and electrical power consumption were closely related (Lacko 2000, p. 347). In fact, from their observations, electrical consumption and GDP elasticity were close to a one-to-one ratio (Lacko 1999, p. 143). This was true in the case of countries under a market economy; however, it did not appear to be the case for former Soviet bloc countries.

The works of Daniel Kaufman and Aleksandr Kaliberda followed a similar path as Istvan Dobozi and Gerhard Pohl's work. Kaufman and Kaliberda developed a method that considered the growth rate of the formal market's GDP and the growth of electrical consumption (Lacko 2000, p. 123). It was evident, as noted by Dobozi and Pohl, that change within the GDP resulted in lockstep changes with electrical consumption for market economies; however, Kaufman and Kaliberda also noted that the former Soviet bloc countries did not seem to maintain this consistency. The researchers suggested that the transitional nature of these countries' economic development created a break in the consistency between GDP and electrical consumption (Lacko 2000, p. 350). Kaufman and Kaliberda adapted their approach to allow for the calculation of this inconsistency between electrical activity and GDP.

Lacko disagreed with the previous methods use of aggregate electrical consumption as the primary source of calculations to determine the extent of the hidden economy (Lacko 1999, p. 164). Additionally, Lacko expressed concerns with the assumption of a constant electrical intensification (Lacko 1999, p. 164). The household electricity approach was developed as an alternative (Lacko 1999, pp. 142–143).

== General concepts ==
The household electricity approach follows the general idea that electrical consumption and GDP can help to estimate the size of a country's hidden market; however, the household electricity approach makes several diversions from the previous works for enhanced utility, particularly for transitional countries. The first of these was the decision to limit the concept of the informal market. Lacko limits the informal market to non-registered activities that consume household electricity. This excludes hidden activities such as bribes and many illegal activities (Lacko 1998, p. 132). By doing this, Lacko limited the magnitude of the data collecting process. Lacko also chose not to measure national electrical consumption; instead, the effort was centered on household electrical consumption (Lacko 2000, p. 361). This, in particular, would capture businesses within the informal market that were operating from a homestead. These businesses have been considered to be a traditional and rather large component of the informal economies of Eastern Europe. Additionally, Lacko presumed that household electrical consumption would not be as dramatically affected by structural changes caused by transitional experiences such as those of the former Soviet bloc countries.

Lacko's method begins with the basic premise that each household's electrical consumption should be associated with a portion of the informal market (Lacko 1999, p. 161). This is determined by using time-series cross sections of each country. Within this method there are three proxy variables to be studied: tax/GDP ratio, the inactive/active labor ratio and the ratio of public social welfare expenditures (Lacko 2000, p. 362). For Lacko's original study the parameters were focused on estimates of cross-sections from nineteen OECD countries in 1990, nineteen OECD countries in 1989 and panel data for 1989-1990(Lacko 2000, p. 362). The final determinization was completed by subtracting residential electrical consumption from the actual amount of electrical consumption (Lacko 2000, p. 362).

== Formula ==
     1nE + I = α11nCi + α2Gi + α4Qi + αHi + α6
     Hi = β1Ti + β2(Si – Ti) + β3Di
          β1>0 β2 <0           β3 >0

where:

i : the number assigned to the country
E_{i} : per capita household electricity consumption in country i in Mtoe
C_{i} : per capita real consumption of households without the consumption of electricity in country i in US dollars (purchasing parity)
PR_{i} : the real price of consumption of 1kwh of residential electricity in US dollars (at purchasing parity)
G_{i} : the relative frequency of months with the need of heating in houses in country i
Qi : the ratio of energy sources other than electric energy to all energy sources in household energy consumption
H_{i} : the per capita output of the hidden economy
T_{i} : the ratio of the sum of paid personal income, corporate profit and taxes on goods and services to GDP
S_{i} : the ratio of public social welfare expenditures to GDP
D_{i} : the sum of number of dependents over 14 years and of inactive earners, both per 100 active earners

(Lacko 1998, p. 133)

After the total electricity consumption of households has been determined, the next step is to proceed to find the informal economy's contribution to the GDP of a country (Lacko 1998, p. 140). To create this index, Lacko had to determine a way to calculate how much GDP is produced by one unit of electricity (Lacko 1998, p. 140). This was done by taking known estimations of a market economy and making comparisons with this to another approach (Lacko 1998, p. 140).

== Advantages ==
The household electricity approach does not require predetermined weights as had been established in previous approaches utilizing electrical consumption to determine the extent of the hidden economy (Lacko 1999, p. 149). Instead, the weights of the different causes can be determined during the estimation. By the use of residential electrical consumption, Lacko's approach allows for an accurate measure of market economies as well as transitional economies approaches utilizing electrical consumption to determine the extent of the hidden economy.

== Disadvantages ==
A disadvantage of the household electricity approach is that it is limited in its scope of study. The range of the study can only include those parts of the hidden economy that utilize household electricity (Lacko 1999, p. 150).

== Criticisms ==
The primary criticism for the household electricity approach, as well as other electrical consumption approaches, centers around the assumptions made regarding the stability of the consistency of electrical consumption with GDP. Critics suggest that levels of stability can be altered significantly by the omission of such basic factors as shifts in the weather (Hanousek and Palda 2004, p. 14). The authors of electrical consumption approaches have admittedly been aware of the weakness of their assumptions and have made attempts to control for factors that would make electrical consumption inconsistent with GDP; however, critics do not see these attempts as being adequate enough (Hanousek and Palda 2006, p. 709).

== Sources ==
1. Hanousek, Jan; Filip Palda (May 2004). "Mission Implausible III: Measuring the Informal Sector in a Transition Economy using Macro Methods". SSRN 552124.
2. Hanousek, Jan; Palda, Filip (2006). "Problems measuring the underground economy in transition". Economics of Transition. 14 (4): 707–718. doi:10.1111/j.1468-0351.2006.00268.x. S2CID 154890043.
3. Lacko, Maria (1998). The Hidden Economies of Visegrad Countries in International Comparison: A Household Electricity Approach, in L.Halpern and Ch. Wyplosz (Eds.):Hungary: Towards a Market Economy. Cambridge University Press. ISBN 0-521-63068-1.
4. Lacko, Maria (2000). Do Power Consumption Data Tell the Story?– Electricity Intensity and Hidden Economy in Post-Socialist Countries, in E. Maskin and A. Simonovits (Eds.):Planning, Shortage, and Transformation: Essays in Honor of János Kornai. The MIT Press. ISBN 0-262-13357-1.
5. Lacko, Maria (1999). Electricity Intensity and the Unrecorded Economy in Post-Socialist Countries, in E. Feige and K. Ott(Eds.):Underground Economies in Transition. Ashgate Publishing Ltd. ISBN 1-84014-960-4.
6. Lacko, Maria (March 2000). "Hidden Economy - an Unknown Quantity? Comparative Analysis of Hidden Economies in Transition Countries, 1989-95". Economics of Transition. 8 (1). Springer: 117–149. doi:10.1111/1468-0351.00038.
