= Kellogg Switchboard and Supply Company =

American telecommunications equipment manufacturer

Kellogg company logo as used from the 1920s to the 1950s

The Kellogg Switchboard and Supply Company was an American manufacturer of telecommunication equipment. Anticipating the expiration of the earliest, fundamental Bell System patents, Milo G. Kellogg, an electrical engineer, founded the company in 1897 in Chicago to produce telephone exchange equipment and telephone apparatus.

Along with Western Electric, which supplied the Bell System, Automatic Electric supplying General Telephone, and Stromberg-Carlson, also supplying the independent telephone markets, Kellogg shared in the business of providing the bulk of the nation's telephone equipment until after World War II.

== History ==
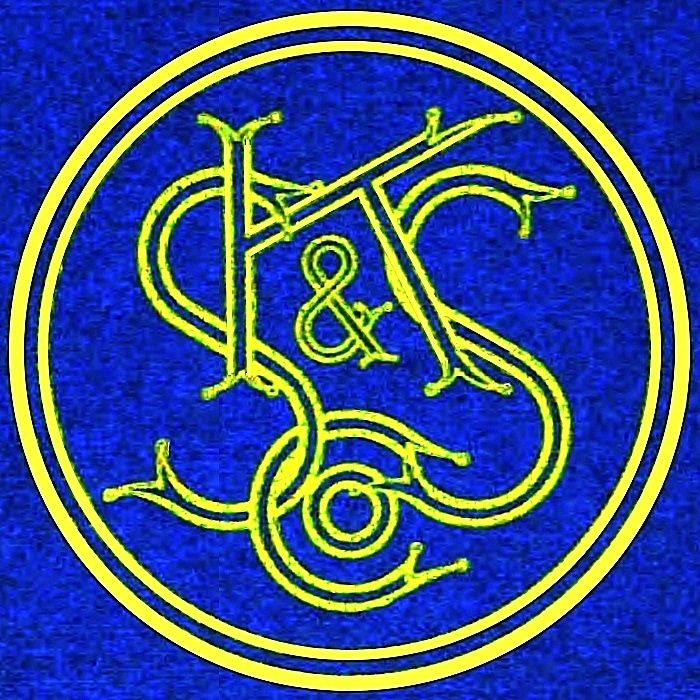
Kellogg company logo (c. 1907)

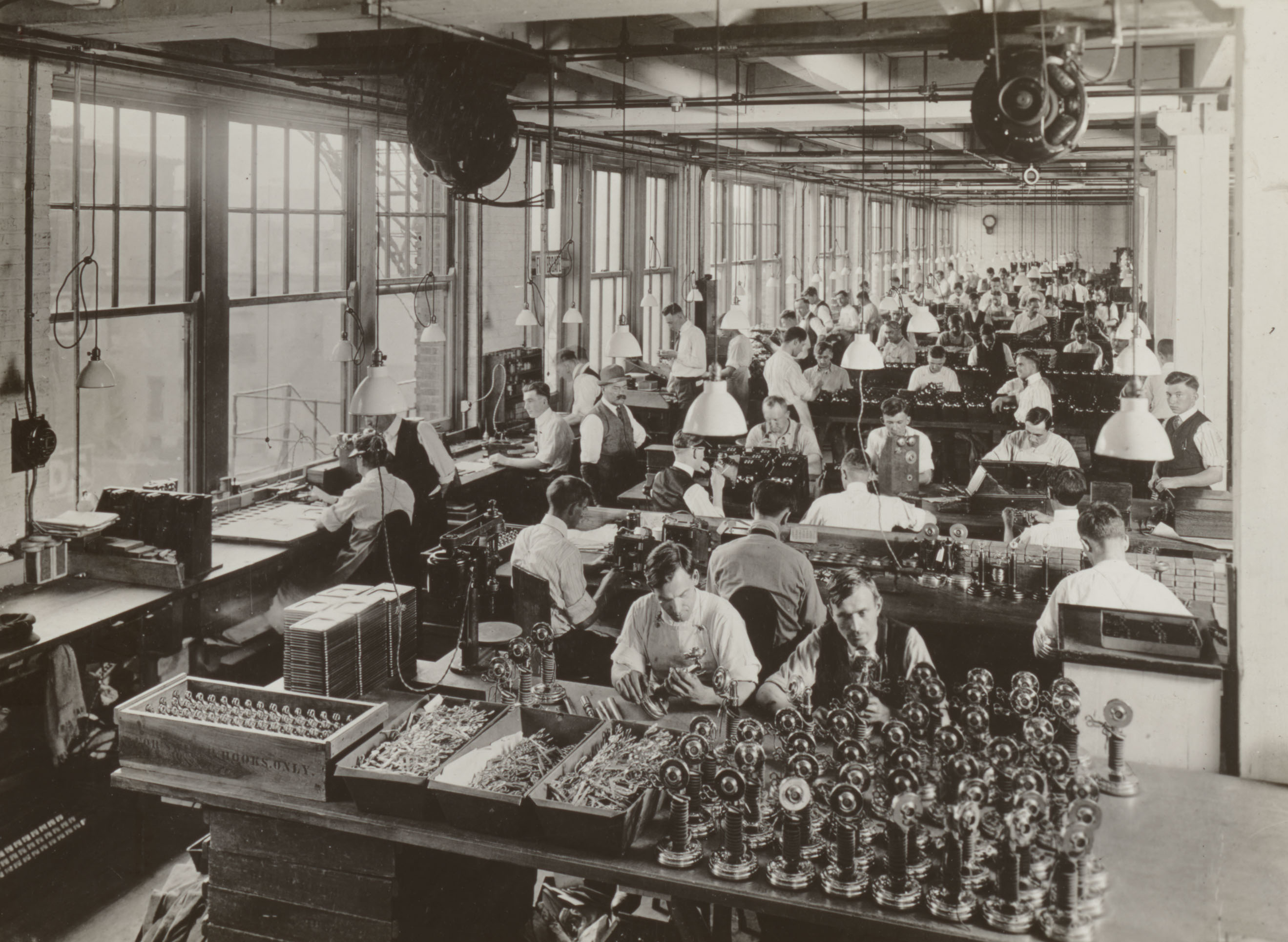
Desk stand department in Chicago, 1917

Milo G. Kellogg was born into a prominent, wealthy New England family. He attended prep school, and received two degrees in engineering from the University of Rochester. He married a member of one of Chicago's most prestigious families, and relocated to Illinois.

In the 1880s, Kellogg was a manager at Western Electric as superintendent of its Chicago manufacturing and research plant, and also at the Southern Telephone and Telegraph Company. In 1897, with Alexander Graham Bell's patent for the telephone expiring, Kellogg established a manufacturing firm, the Kellogg Switchboard & Supply Company. Kellogg himself held more than 150 patents, and had invented the divided multiple telephone switchboard, which became the flagship product of the new company. This switchboard offered greater flexibility and efficiency than earlier designs in handling a large telephone subscriber base at urban exchanges. Kellogg primarily supplied local independent telephone companies.

=== Fight for control ===
In 1901, Kellogg fell seriously ill. His brother-in-law, Wallace DeWolf, proved to be a poor manager. Concerned that the company might fail, DeWolf secretly sold a majority of Kellogg's stock to Western Electric. Easily manipulated by Western Electric executives and legal advisors, DeWolf also helped Western Electric attempt to take over the country's other large telephone equipment manufacturer, Stromberg-Carlson. A bitter stockholder fight ensued, which led to Stromberg-Carlson's reincorporation as a New York state corporation in 1902.

When Milo Kellogg recovered his health, and discovered what DeWolf had done, he sued to stop the sale of his stock. In two separate decisions by the Supreme Court of Illinois—Brown v. Cragg, 230 Ill. 299 (1907) and Dunbar v. American Telephone and Telegraph, 238 Ill. 456 (1909)—Kellogg retained ownership of his company.

=== 1903 strike ===
In 1903, the Kellogg Switchboard and Supply Company was the target of a bitter strike by the Brass Molder's Union Local 83 and the International Brotherhood of Teamsters. Kellogg was supported by the Bell Telephone Trust (which at the time owned most of Kellogg Switchboard's stock), the Illinois Manufacturers' Association, and the Employers' Association of Chicago. Kellogg Switchboard sued to stop the Teamsters from engaging in their sympathy strike, and won an injunction forcing the drivers back to work. The Kellogg company refused to negotiate, fired nearly 90% of its workforce, and broke the strike.

=== Post-WWII ===
The ITT Corporation purchased a controlling interest in the Kellogg Switchboard and Supply Company in 1952, rebranding the new division's equipment as ITT Kellogg for a decade. In 1958, ITT Kellogg was a contractor to the U.S. Air Force, for which Kellogg build a ground communication system for the ballistic missile base at Cooke Air Force Base.

Also in 1958, Kellogg Corporation established a location in Raleigh, North Carolina for the production of telecommunications transmission equipment. The location at 2912 Wake Forest Road was in manufacturing operations until 1990 as a recent merged Alcatel location. This 24-acre site later became a research and development facility between 1991 and 2003.

In 1987, ITT sold its telecommunications product lines, including ITT Kellogg, to French company Alsthom, creating Alcatel N.V. of the Netherlands. ITT had a 37% stake in the new company, which it sold in 1992 to complete its exit from the telecommunications equipment business. Meanwhile, the former Kellogg customer-premises equipment business unit based at Corinth, Mississippi was given a new name – Cortelco – and in July 1990 was sold to a former ITT executive, David S. Lee. In December 2008, eOn Communications (where Lee was chairman and CEO) announced an agreement to acquire Cortelco Systems Holding Corporation.

== Bibliography ==
- Adams, Stephen B., and Butler, Orville R, Manufacturing the Future: A History of Western Electric. New York: Cambridge University Press, 1999. ISBN 978-0-521-65118-9
- Clarke S.J., Chicago: Pictorial and Biographical. Vol. 2, Deluxe Supplement. Chicago (1912).
- Cohen, Andrew Wender, "Business Myths, Lawyerly Strategies, and Social Context: Ernst on Labor Law History." Law & Social Inquiry. 23:1 (January 1989).
- Cohen, Andrew Wender, The Racketeer's Progress: Chicago and the Struggle for the Modern American Economy, 1900-1940. New York: Cambridge University Press, 2004. ISBN 978-0-521-83466-7
- Ernst, David R. Lawyers Against Labor: From Individual Rights to Corporate Liberalism. Champaign, Ill.: University of Illinois Press, 1995. ISBN 978-0-252-06512-5
- Chicago Daily Tribute, Facing Defeat Unions Weaken (July 18, 1903)
- Gable, Richard W., Birth of an Employers' Association., Business History Review, 33:4 (Winter, 1959).
- Chicago Historical Society, Dictionary of Leading Chicago Businesses (1820-2000); Kellogg Switchboard & Supply Co. Chicago (2005).
