= Adolf Kraus =

American lawyer

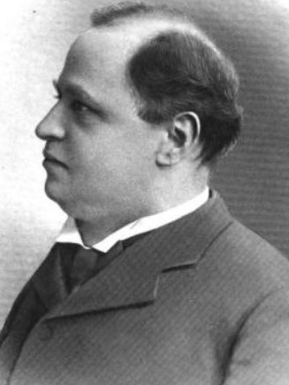

Lawyer and President of the Chicago Board of Education
- In office 1885–1886
- Preceded by: James Rood Doolittle
- Succeeded by: Allan C. Story
- In office 1883–1884
- Preceded by: Norman Bridge
- Succeeded by: James Rood Doolittle

Personal details
- Born: February 26, 1850 Blovice, Bohemia
- Died: October 22, 1928 (aged 78) Chicago, Illinois, United States
- Resting place: Rosehill Cemetery
- Occupation: Lawyer
- Known for: co-founder of the law firm Mayer Brown

Adolf Kraus (February 26, 1850 – October 22, 1928) was an American lawyer, political figure, and Jewish leader.

== Biography ==
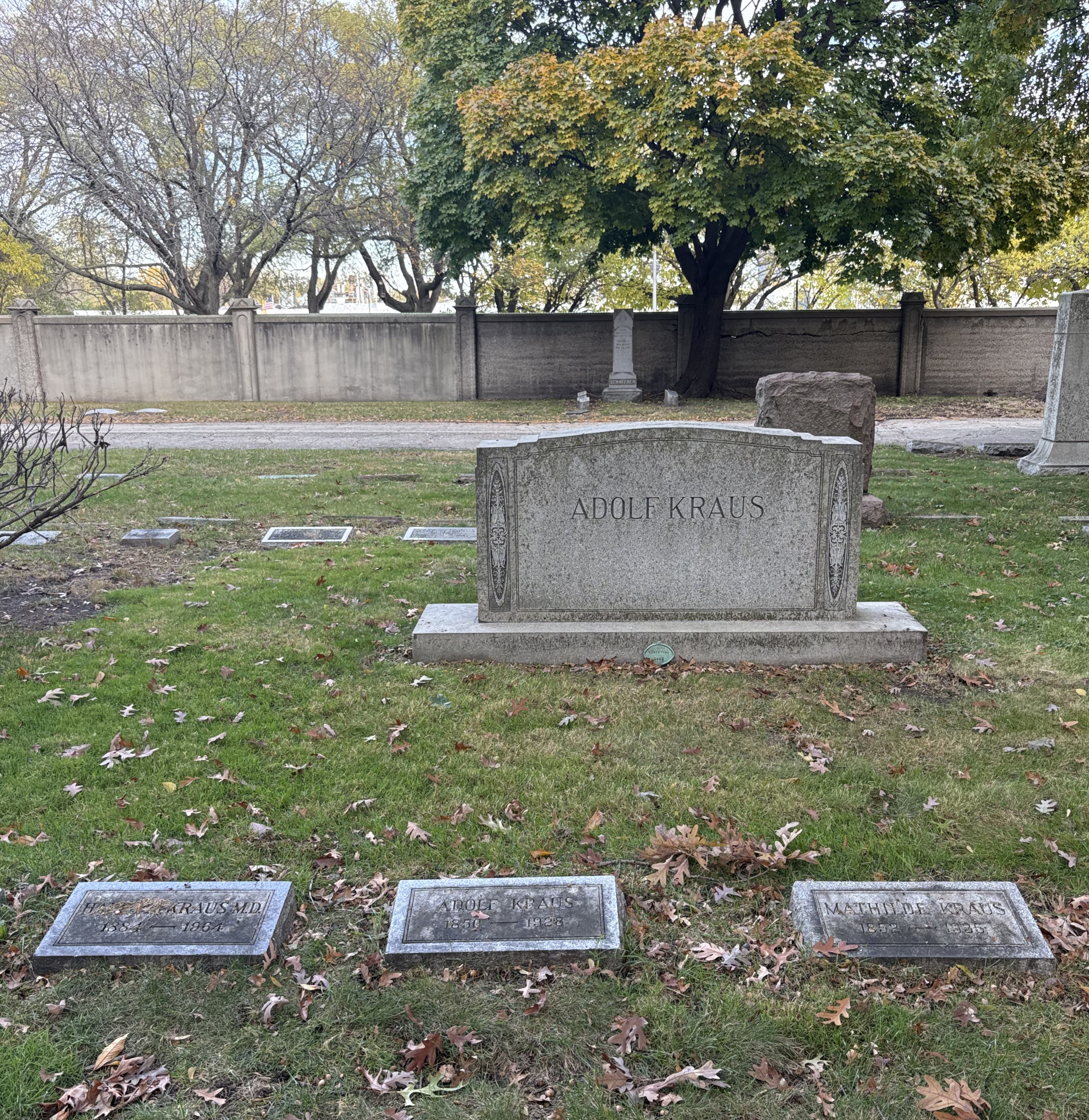
Kraus's grave (center) at Rosehill Cemetery

At the age of 15 he left the Bohemian town of Rokycany where he had grown up and emigrated to the United States. He worked on a farm and in a factory, later settling in Chicago where he completed his law studies before becoming a lawyer. He is one of the founding partner in the law firm of Kraus and Mayer which is one of the legacy firms that later formed Mayer Brown.

In 1897 he was the second president of the civil service commission. He also became a grand officer of B'nai B'rith (president of Isaiah Temple in Chicago) and a prominent executive of the Union of American Hebrew Congregations (nowadays the Union for Reform Judaism).

In both the 1891 and 1893 Chicago mayoral elections, Kraus served as the campaign manager for Carter Harrison Sr.

From 1883 to 1884 and, again, from 1885 to 1886, Kraus served as president of the Chicago Board of Education.

Kraus had close contacts to American presidents William Howard Taft and Woodrow Wilson. In his position he also helped Czech and Jewish immigrants to the USA.

Kraus died at his home in Chicago on October 22, 1928, and was buried at Rosehill Cemetery.

In 1930 a commemorative plaque of Adolf Kraus was unveiled in the town of Rokycany, on the house where he spent his childhood. However, in the 1940s, during the occupation of Czechoslovakia by Nazi Germany, the plaque was pulled down.

The house (No.147 in Havlíčkova ulice Street) was demolished in the 1980s.
