= Employers' Association of Greater Chicago =

The Employers' Association of Greater Chicago (EA) was a nonprofit association of employers based in Chicago, Illinois. It was founded as the Employers' Association of Chicago in 1903, although it was also known colloquially as the Chicago Employers' Association. Its goal was to oppose the unionization of companies in the Chicago area, and assist unionized companies in deunionization.

Over time, the organization's commitment to union avoidance lessened greatly and the organization became more heavily involved in traditional human resources training and consulting. The organization changed its name to the Employers' Association of Greater Chicago in 1959, and merged with the Midwest Industrial Management Association in 1981.

== Founding and early years ==
The group was founded as the Employers' Association of Chicago (the EA) in 1902 during a strike against telephone equipment manufacturers.

In January 1902, Brass Molder's Union Local 83 struck Stromberg-Carlson and Western Electric, seeking to win the closed shop in collective bargaining negotiations. The employers locked out the workers and brought in strikebreakers. Union members began attacking the strikebreakers. On May 7, 1903, the union struck the Kellogg Switchboard & Supply Company. Kellogg Switchboard, too, locked out 90 percent of its workforce and hired strikebreakers. The Teamsters Joint Council of Chicago began a sympathy strike on June 24, 1903. The three employers sought injunctions against the sympathy strike, which they won on July 20, 1903. The Brass Molders' strike collapsed soon afterward.

During the summer of 1902, the Employers' Association of Chicago was formed. John G. Shedd, vice-president of Marshall Field & Company, was the primary force behind the organization of the group. Shedd became the first president. Montgomery Ward manager (later president) Robert J. Thorne was the first vice-president; grocery store president Frank H. Armstrong of Reid, Murdoch & Company the second vice-president; and William E. Clow, president of plumbing manufacturer J.B. Clow & Co. Its goal was to secure the open shop, resist unionization, and break unions in workplaces where they existed. The group kept its membership secret for fear of generating strikes by the Teamsters. By the end of the year, the EA's existence had become public knowledge and the organization had hired its first staff person, former labor arbitrator Frederick W. Job. The EA was heavily funded by the city's banks, and by other large companies such as Rand McNally.

The EA took its first active role in a labor dispute during the 1902-03 telephone equipment strike. The Teamsters and team owners had formed a body known as the Chicago Board of Arbitration (CBA) in early 1903. Ostensibly, the CBA was established to mediate disputes between drivers and their employers. But the CBA quickly asserted jurisdiction over all labor disputes in the city. The Teamsters could force employers to the table by striking, where the team owners would win decisions which enabled them to profit at the expense of other business owners. When the CBA attempted to intervene in the telephone equipment strike, the EA retaliated. The EA threw its entire support behind Kellogg Switchboard, which subsequently refused to bargain with the union. The EA also supplied funds and legal expertise which enabled Kellogg Switchboard to win a court injunction forcing the Teamsters to end their sympathy strike. These actions helped break the strike.

The Teamsters quickly became the biggest target of the EA. In early 1904, the Teamsters aligned all their contracts to expire simultaneously on May 1, 1905. The EA then passed a resolution on June 16, 1904, declaring that no employer would sign a contract with the Teamsters after May 1, 1905.

The EA's biggest anti-union push came in 1905. On December 15, 1904, 19 clothing cutters at Montgomery Ward went on strike to protest the company's use of nonunion subcontractors. The Montgomery Ward quickly locked them out. Sympathy strikes by several tailors' unions broke out, as did sympathy strikes by other unions. By April, 5,000 workers were on the picket line. The Teamsters engaged in a sympathy strike on April 6, 1905, adding another 10,000 members to the strike. The EA collected $250,000 (about $6.2 million in 2007 dollars) from its members to hire strikebreakers. The EA also raised $1 million (about $25 million in 2007 dollars) to establish the Employers' Teaming Association-a new company which, within a matter of weeks, bought out a large number of team owners and imported hundreds of African American strikebreakers from St. Louis to drive the wagons. Mark Morton, president of Morton Salt and an EA member, convinced the railroads to pressure the remaining team owners to lock out their Teamster members as well. The Teamsters upped the ante, and another 25,000 members walked off the job on April 25, 1905, paralyzing grocery stores, warehouses, railway shippers, department stores and coal companies. The EA and its members sued nearly every union as well. Local and state courts issued numerous injunctions against the unions, ordering them to stop picketing and return to work. When a wagon owner refused to do business with Montgomery Ward for fear that the Teamsters would picket him, a court forced the team owner to do business with the retailer. Few courts were impartial in their administration of justice. One judge seated a grand jury whose foreman was A. A. McCormick, the reactionary publisher of the Chicago Evening Post.

The strike ended not through the efforts of the EA or the unions, but due to the allegations of John C. Driscoll. In June 1905, the grand jury led by foreman McCormick heard testimony by Driscoll, who at the time was secretary of the team owners' association. Driscoll claimed that he had taken at least $10,000 in bribes from Thorne and executives at other companies to force the unions out on strike. Driscoll also alleged that the Teamsters and other unions had demanded bribes to end the strike, and that Driscoll had skimmed portions of these bribes into his own pocket. $50,000 in cancelled checks were produced in court to support Driscoll's claims. Although Driscoll's testimony undercut both sides, public support for the unions suffered most. Although nearly every union continued to support the strike publicly, most sent their members back to work by the end of June. The Teamsters continued to support the strike, but various divisions of the union also went back to work in June and July. By August 1, 1905, the strike was over and the employers ended the lockout.

== 1920s and 1930s ==
The EA pressed its advantage against Chicago's unions. It added building owners as members in 1913, and supported them in their fight with the Building Service Employees International Union. It helped expose efforts to extort money from property owners in 1921, which led to the indictment and eventual imprisonment of BSEIU president William Quesse. In 1921, the EA attacked nascent unions in grocery stores and food industries, accusing them of vandalism, bombings and extortion as well. In the early and mid-1920s, the EA put pressure on unions in the city's milk and ice industries, accusing unions of blackmail, extortion, and establishing anti-competitive trusts and price fixing.

The focus on illegal activities by unions proved so effective that the EA's main priority became attacking labor racketeering. The term "racketeering" was, in fact, coined by the Employers' Association of Chicago in June 1927 in a statement about the influence of organized crime in the Teamsters union. Reports about rackets and other illegal activities by labor unions and employers were issued annually by the EA. In 1928, for example, the Employers' Association claimed that exactly 46 rackets were operating in Chicago. The EA reported on the use of thugs and gunmen by both unions and employers, and excoriated the public and government officials for not prosecuting rackets more often or more successfully. EA reports also focused on bombings in the city. These reports provide statistical documentation of the level of organized crime-related violence in the city (although the EA reports rarely distinguish between union- or employer-instigated violence and violence undertaken by mob-dominated unions or employers). The Association's October 1928 report, which documented an astonishing 727 bombings in Chicago in the previous year, led to the formation of the city's first arson unit.

In October 1928, Employers' Association president James W. Breen was linked to the rackets himself. Chicago police investigators alleged that Breen had helped form a battery makers' cartel, and that this trade group was shaking down non-members. Breen promptly resigned as president of the association. A year later, organized crime figures bombed Breen's home for fear that the ongoing investigation might lead to Breen's indictment and that he might inform on his associates. But Breen was never indicted, however.

The Employers' Association made its first foray into legislative lobbying in 1928 as well. That year, it called for repeal of the state of Illinois' "horse thief law," which permitted posses to form legally so long as they were in hot pursuit of criminals. The EA claimed that the law led citizens and employers to mistakenly believe gangs of union members were legal deputies when they were not. Three months later, the Association campaigned for a new city ordinance which would ban the resale of seized weapons to the public. The sale of the guns, the EA claimed, merely put more weapons in the hands of criminals while inducing law enforcement personnel to seize the weapons of law-abiding citizens.

The Employers' Association campaign against rackets remained strong through 1935. In 1929, the EA issued a report estimating the costs of racketeering in the city of Chicago at $136 million a year (about $1.6 billion in 2007 dollars). In August 1929, the Association reported 67 bombings in the past year, compared to 46 in 1928. The organization also posted a $5,000 reward for information leading to the conviction of any bomber, and a $1,000 reward for information leading to the conviction of any racketeer who assaulted an Employers' Association member. The bombing campaign only intensified, however, with another 30 bombings in August and September 1929. In 1931, the Association went public with a report which estimated the cost of bombings at $500 million ($6.8 billion in 2007 dollars), and the cost of racketeering at $145 million ($1.9 billion in 2007 dollars). By 1932, the Employers' Association was claiming that the bombings and rackets cost the city more than the taxes it paid to fight World War I. Whether the EA's anti-racketeering campaign had any effect is unclear. The Great Depression had caused union membership to drop significantly, and the end of Prohibition in the United States largely ended organized crime's primary motive for engaging in widespread violence. But the EA campaign had also led to strengthened anti-racketeering laws and stronger enforcement as well. By 1934, the number of bombings had dropped to their lowest since 1923.

== Attacks on federal labor policy ==
The passage of the National Labor Relations Act (the Wagner Act) in 1935 energized the Employers' Association, and drew it into a new field of activity. Although the EA had long opposed collective bargaining, federal legislation protecting labor unions took the organization by surprise. The Association vociferously attacked President Franklin D. Roosevelt's labor policies. But like many employers, the EA took a "wait and see" attitude until the U.S. Supreme Court had ruled on the Wagner Act's constitutionality. The court upheld the constitutionality of the statute in 1937 in National Labor Relations Board v. Jones & Laughlin Steel Corporation 301 U.S. 1 (1937). The EA rarely attacked the act for the remainder of the 1930s or during World War II.

However, in the post-war period it once more blasted unions and the federal government's labor policies. The EA undertook a campaign to influence Congressional opinion, and pushed strongly for repeal of the Wagner Act. When repeal seemed out of reach, the EA supported the Taft-Hartley Act and the Labor Management Reporting and Disclosure Act (LMRDA). It also sponsored a program to take advantage of the provisions of both acts by bolstering the role foremen played in the workplace.

By the late 1930s, labor-related disruptions and violence in Chicago had been greatly reduced. Chicago law enforcement was also cracking down heavily on labor violence and racketeering, which won high praise from the Employers' Association.

The Association became much less active in labor relations in the 1950s and 1960s. The organization undertook a brief resurgence of interested in rackets in 1951, however. It attacked the Chicago Retail Druggists Association for "forcing" pharmacies to pay dues to the group, accused the restaurant workers' union of extorting money from cafes, threatened to sue the Teamsters union for violations of the LMRDA, and more. It even went so far as to hire a former FBI agent, Frederick W. Turner, Jr., to investigate labor racketeering in the city. But none of these campaigns had the impact of its 1920 efforts, and Turner's investigations produced next to nothing. No indictments or grand jury investigations occurred, either. By November 1951, the EA dropped its pretense of "fair play" and announced it openly opposed unionization of every workplace. But this militaristic stand did little to revive the group.

The EA tried again to focus public attention on labor racketeering in 1962. Once more, it hired an ex-FBI agent to investigate racketeering in the city of Chicago, and accused unions of using simple picketing as a means of extortion. But the legal and political climate had changed, and these efforts were often unsuccessful. In November 1964, Chicago City Council Alderman Thomas E. Keane accused the EA of anti-union bias—a charge the Association roundly denied.

The EA played a role in three more strikes, both of them affecting mechanics at auto dealerships. In 1968, the Association acted as a spokesperson for the auto dealers in their attempt to resist unionization. The mechanics unionized, and struck the auto dealers in 1975, 1978 and 1981. During each strike, the EA strongly and publicly supported the dealerships and continued to act as their primary spokesperson. But the EA played little role other than that of public relations.

== Human resources and other initiatives, 1950-1980 ==
The Employers' Association had engaged in its first human resources consulting in 1918. That year, it undertook a very successful campaign to encourage local businesses to hire middle-age managers with experience rather than discharge them.

The EA did little in this field, however, until the 1940s. As its anti-union campaigns flagged, the organization began to become more of a human resources consulting agency for its members. In 1941, it released its first survey of workforce needs. Some of its human resources educational efforts remained linked to its traditional anti-unionism, however. In 1942, it campaigned for a longer workweek—ostensibly to meet wartime production demands, but which also violated union demands for shorter work periods. In 1949, the group denounced fringe benefits such as health insurance, pensions, and life insurance as "unnecessary" and "unwise" and exorbitantly expensive. It also declared unemployment insurance to be too costly and unnecessary, and demanded dismantling of public welfare programs.

The EA also became involved in broader social issues. Its leadership, always concerned with the spread of collectivist ideals, denounced President Harry S. Truman as a socialist and demanded that Congress rein in the president's economic policies. The organization also attacked the publishers of elementary and junior high school textbooks for allowing "communist" influences.

Long-time Association executive director (now president) Gordon L. Hostetter died in 1962, depriving the Employers' Association of its most active leadership. Throughout the 1960s and 1970s, the organization quietly worked with its members to improve their human resources capacities. It defended employers when they were accused of racial bias in the administration of employment tests. But the EA abandoned most of its anti-union programs. The organization's membership, which had hovered at the 1,000-member mark for 60 years, remained stable. But the Association became less and less of an important political and workplace player in Chicago. In 1971, EA president Roland E. Fulton was elected president of the Employer Association Group of the National Association of Manufacturers. But this was the last major role the EA played in either local or national labor relations.

In 1981, the Employers' Association of Greater Chicago (as the group was now known) merged with the Midwest Industrial Management Association. In 1989, MIMA changed its name to become the Management Association of Illinois. The group still has about 1,000 member companies, roughly half of which are in manufacturing and half in the service sector.

== Presidents ==
The known presidents of the EA are:

- John G. Shedd, general manager, Marshall Field & Co.
- Mark Morton, president, Morton Salt
- James W. Breen, attorney
- Earl H. Macoy, president, National Printing and Engraving Co., 1927-1932
- Joseph C. Belden
- Raymond L. Koch
- Gordon L. Hostetter
- Roland E. Fulton

== Other staff ==
- Frederick W. Job, executive director
- Gordon L. Hostetter, executive director
- Joseph Nielson, assistant director, 1923-1943
