= 2021 International Brotherhood of Teamsters election =

Trade union leadership election

2021 International Brotherhood of Teamsters presidential election
- October–November 2021
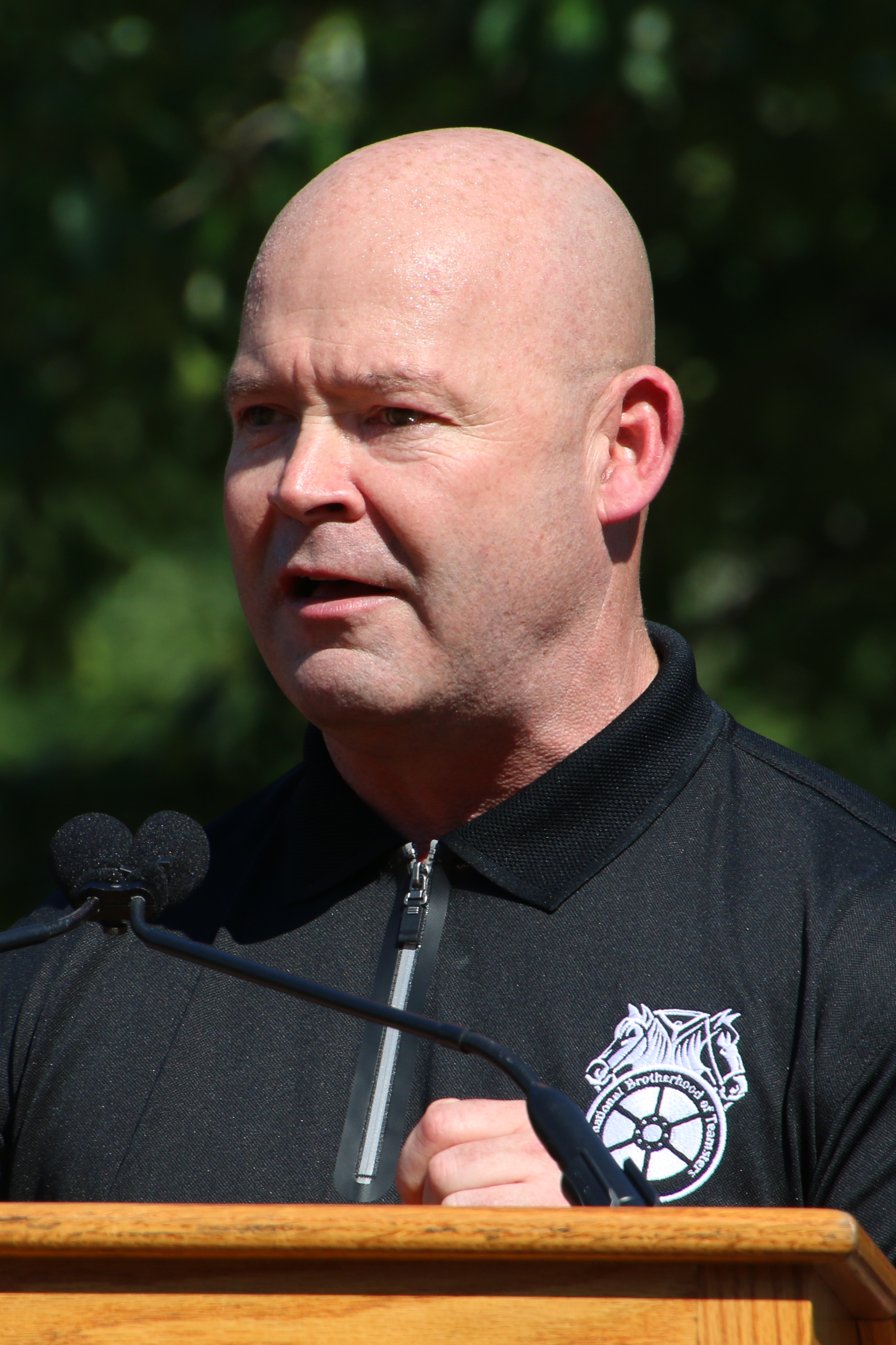

Candidate	Sean O'Brien	Steve Vairma
Slate	Teamsters United	Teamster Power
Popular vote	115,573	57,983
Percentage	66.6%	33.4%
President before election
James P. Hoffa
Elected President
Sean O'Brien

The 2021 leadership election for the International Brotherhood of Teamsters occurred after the General President James P. Hoffa announced his retirement. Ballots were mailed to eligible members of the North American union on October 4, 2021, and counting of the ballots began on November 15, 2021. On November 19, 2021, Sean O'Brien of the Teamsters United slate was declared the winner.

The election was contested by two slates: Teamsters United and Teamster Power. The Teamsters United slate, led by O'Brien of Local 25 in Boston and Fred Zuckerman of Local 89 in Louisville, is aligned with a reform movement within the Teamsters Union. Teamster Power, by Steve Vairma of Local 455 in Denver and Ron Herrera of Local 396 in Los Angeles, was endorsed by and more closely affiliated with Hoffa. Some of the same groups behind Teamsters United ran a slate in 2016 that narrowly lost to Hoffa.

The 2021 Teamsters election was the first in 25 years in which Hoffa did not run. The internal rank-and-file organization Teamsters for a Democratic Union campaigned in favor of Teamsters United, on the basis of dissatisfaction around issues including contract negotiations and pension arrangements. The winning Teamsters United slate has been associated with a younger, more militant generation of labor leadership that has been gaining in organization and popularity in some industries in the United States.

== Results ==
=== General President ===
Candidate	Slate	Total votes	%	By region									
Candidate	Slate	Total votes	%	Central	%	Eastern	%	Southern	%	Western	%	Canada	%
Sean O'Brien	Teamsters United	115,573	66.6	35,825	71.0	39,361	74.7	13,047	71.1	25,592	56.8	1,748	25.1
Steve Vairma	Teamster Power	57,983	33.4	14,654	29.0	13,355	25.3	5,309	28.9	19,455	43.2	5,210	74.9
Total		173,556	100.0	50,479	100.0	52,716	100.0	18,356	100.0	45,047	100.0	6,958	100.0
Source: International Brotherhood of Teamsters

=== General Secretary-Treasurer ===
Candidate	Slate	Total votes	%	By region									
Candidate	Slate	Total votes	%	Central	%	Eastern	%	Southern	%	Western	%	Canada	%
Fred Zuckerman	Teamsters United	113,143	65.4	35,437	70.3	38,353	73.0	12,716	69.4	25,091	55.8	1,546	22.9
Ron Herrera	Teamster Power	59,896	34.6	15,001	29.7	14,199	27.0	5,616	30.6	19,876	44.2	5,204	77.1
Total		173,039	100.0	50,438	100.0	52,552	100.0	18,332	100.0	44,967	100.0	6,750	100.0
Source: International Brotherhood of Teamsters

=== Vice Presidents at Large ===
Candidate	Slate	Total votes	%	By region									
Candidate	Slate	Total votes	%	Central	%	Eastern	%	Southern	%	Western	%	Canada	%
Juan Campos	Teamsters United	112,632	9.5	35,155	10.1	38,288	10.6	12,576	10.1	25,121	8.2	1,492	3.2
Joan Corey	Teamsters United	112,440	9.5	35,175	10.1	38,073	10.5	12,627	10.1	24,991	8.1	1,574	3.4
Chris Griswold	Teamsters United	112,173	9.4	35,099	10.1	38,206	10.6	12,480	10.0	24,900	8.1	1,488	3.2
Tony Jones	Teamsters United	112,119	9.4	35,094	10.1	38,018	10.5	12,663	10.1	24,839	8.1	1,505	3.2
Greg Floyd	Teamsters United	112,074	9.4	34,971	10.1	38,157	10.6	12,634	10.1	24,809	8.1	1,503	3.2
James Wright	Teamsters United	112,064	9.4	35,102	10.1	37,988	10.5	12,562	10.0	24,896	8.1	1,516	3.3
John Palmer	Teamsters United	111,766	9.4	35,111	10.1	37,916	10.5	12,385	9.9	24,841	8.1	1,513	3.3
Debra Simmons-Peterson	Teamster Power	58,283	4.9	14,791	4.3	13,505	3.7	5,418	4.3	19,388	6.3	5,181	11.2
Bernadette McCulloch Kelly	Teamster Power	57,980	4.9	14,527	4.2	13,847	3.8	5,245	4.2	19,202	6.2	5,159	11.1
Nina Bugbee	Teamster Power	57,644	4.9	14,586	4.2	13,359	3.7	5,261	4.2	19,290	6.3	5,148	11.1
Marcus King	Teamster Power	57,429	4.8	14,405	4.1	13,520	3.7	5,261	4.2	19,137	6.2	5,106	11.0
Dennis Pierce	Teamster Power	57,423	4.8	14,450	4.2	13,528	3.7	5,400	4.3	18,969	6.2	5,076	11.0
Greg Nowak	Teamster Power	57,192	4.8	14,467	4.2	13,527	3.7	5,195	4.2	18,947	6.1	5,056	10.9
James Curbeam	Teamster Power	56,371	4.7	14,216	4.1	12,950	3.6	5,352	4.3	18,827	6.1	5,026	10.8
Total		1,187,590	100.0	347,149	100.0	360,882	100.0	125,059	100.0	308,157	100.0	46,343	100.0
Source: International Brotherhood of Teamsters

=== Vice Presidents for the Central Region ===
Candidate	Slate	Votes	%
Tom Erickson	Teamsters United	35,542	23.8
Danny Avelyn	Teamsters United	35,124	23.5
Avral Thompson	Teamsters United	35,046	23.5
Terry Hancock	Teamster Power	14,639	9.8
Jesse Case	Teamster Power	14,627	9.8
Brian Aldes	Teamster Power	14,415	9.6
Total		149,393	100.0
Source: International Brotherhood of Teamsters

=== Vice Presidents for the Eastern Region ===
Candidate	Slate	Votes	%
Bill Hamilton	Teamsters United	38,786	25.0
Rocco Calo	Teamsters United	37,998	24.5
Matt Taibi	Teamsters United	37,813	24.3
Maria Perez	Teamster Power	13,701	8.8
Paul Markwitz	Teamster Power	13,580	8.7
Thomas Gesualdi	Teamster Power	13,493	8.7
Total		155,371	100.0
Source: International Brotherhood of Teamsters

=== Vice Presidents for the Southern Region ===
Candidate	Slate	Votes	%
Brent Taylor	Teamsters United	12,915	35.5
Thor Johnson	Teamsters United	12,616	34.7
Josh Zivalich	Teamster Power	5,520	15.2
Robert Mele	Teamster Power	5,293	14.6
Total		36,344	100.0
Source: International Brotherhood of Teamsters

=== Vice Presidents for the Western Region ===
Candidate	Slate	Votes	%
Lindsay Dougherty	Teamsters United	25,317	14.3
Rick Hicks	Teamsters United	24,941	14.1
Mark Davison	Teamsters United	24,914	14.1
Peter Finn	Teamsters United	24,860	14.1
Karla Schumann	Teamster Power	19,517	11.0
Eric Tate	Teamster Power	19,251	10.9
Jason Rabinowitz	Teamster Power	19,018	10.8
John Scearcy	Teamster Power	18,908	10.7
Total		176,726	100.0
Source: International Brotherhood of Teamsters

=== Vice Presidents for Teamsters Canada ===
Candidate	Slate	Votes	%
James Hennessy	Team Canada	Elected by acclamation	
François Laporte	Team Canada	Elected by acclamation	
Craig McInnes	Team Canada	Elected by acclamation	
Source: International Brotherhood of Teamsters

=== Trustees ===
Candidate	Slate	Votes	%	By region									
Candidate	Slate	Votes	%	Central	%	Eastern	%	Southern	%	Western	%	Canada	%
Willie Ford	Teamsters United	113,230	22.1	35,384	23.7	38,273	24.6	12,818	23.8	25,198	19.0	1,557	7.8
Dan Kane Jr.	Teamsters United	112,653	22.0	35,203	23.6	38,377	24.7	12,656	23.5	24,897	18.8	1,520	7.6
Vinnie Perrone	Teamsters United	112,313	22.0	35,142	23.5	38,089	24.5	12,639	23.4	24,926	18.8	1,517	7.6
Peter Nunez	Teamster Power	58,380	11.4	14,619	9.8	13,794	8.9	5,329	9.9	19,519	14.7	5,119	25.7
Chris Tongay	Teamster Power	57,374	11.2	14,475	9.7	13,500	8.7	5,251	9.7	19,048	14.4	5,100	25.6
Michael Cales	Teamster Power	57,345	11.2	14,560	9.7	13,291	8.6	5,251	9.7	19,108	14.4	5,135	25.7
Total		511,295	100.0	149,383	100.0	155,324	100.0	53,944	100.0	132,696	100.0	19,948	100.0
Source: International Brotherhood of Teamsters
