= International Brotherhood of Teamsters =

North American trade union

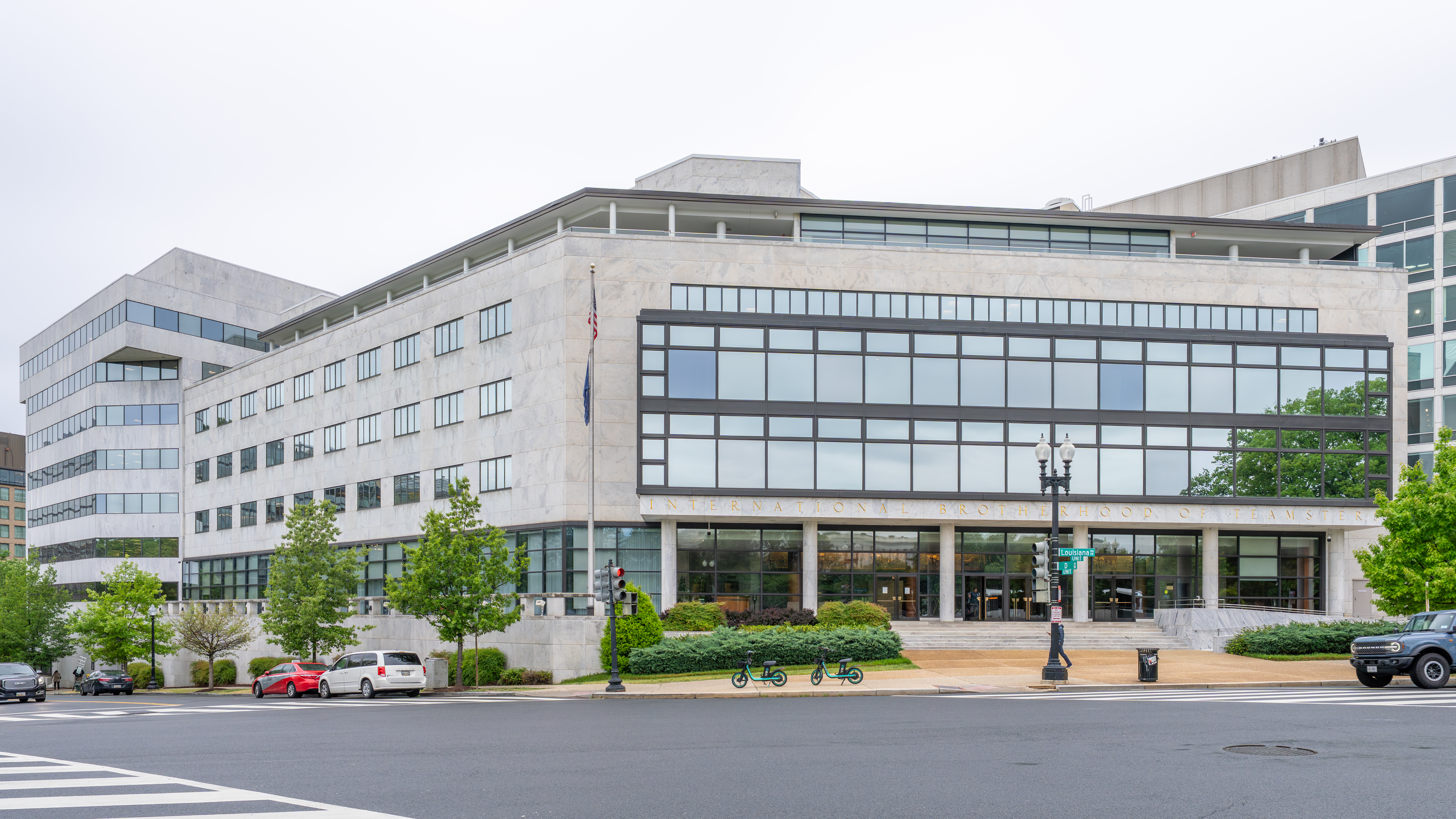
- Headquarters in Washington, D.C.
- Abbreviation: IBT
- Formation: 1903
- Merger of: Team Drivers International Union; Teamsters National Union
- Type: Trade union
- Headquarters: Washington, D.C., U.S.
- Locations: Canada; United States
- Members: 1.25 million (2025)
- General president: Sean M. O'Brien
- Secretary-treasurer: Fred Zuckerman
- Affiliations: IndustriALL Global Union; International Transport Workers' Federation; North America's Building Trades Unions
- Website: teamster.org
- Formerly called: International Brotherhood of Teamsters, Chauffeurs, Warehousemen and Helpers of America

The International Brotherhood of Teamsters (IBT) is a labor union in the United States and Canada. Formed in 1903 by the merger of the Team Drivers International Union and the Teamsters National Union, the union now represents a diverse membership of blue- and white-collar workers in both the public and private sectors, totalling about 1.25 million members in 2025. The union was formerly called the International Brotherhood of Teamsters, Chauffeurs, Warehousemen and Helpers of America.

== History ==
=== Early history ===
The American Federation of Labor (AFL) had helped form local unions of teamsters since 1887. In November 1898, the AFL organized the Team Drivers' International Union (TDIU). In 1901, a group of teamsters in Chicago, Illinois, broke from the TDIU and formed the Teamsters National Union. Unlike the TDIU, which permitted large employers to be members, the new Teamsters National Union permitted only employees, teamster helpers, and owner-operators owning only a single team to join, and advocated higher wages and shorter hours more aggressively than the TDIU. Claiming more than 28,000 members in 47 locals, its president, Albert Young, applied for membership in the AFL. The AFL asked the TDIU to merge with Young's union to form a new, AFL-affiliated union and the two groups did so in 1903, forming the International Brotherhood of Teamsters (IBT), and electing Cornelius Shea as the new union's first president. The election process proved tumultuous. Shea effectively controlled the convention because the Chicago locals—representing nearly half the IBT's membership—supported his candidacy en bloc. Shea was opposed by John Sheridan, president of the Ice Drivers' Union of Chicago. Sheridan and George Innes, president of the TDIU, accused Shea of embezzlement in an attempt to prevent his election. Shea won the election on August 8, 1903, by a vote of 605 to 480. The new grouping elected Edward L. Turley of Chicago as secretary-treasurer and Albert Young as general organizer.

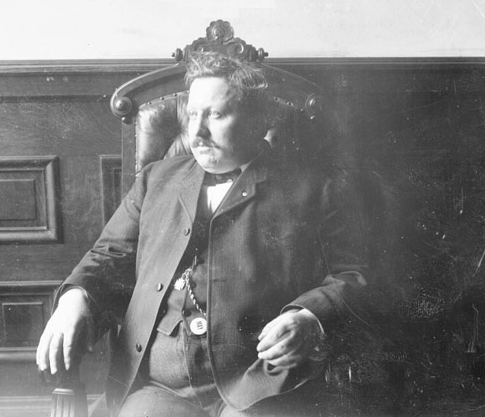
Cornelius Shea, first General President of the Teamsters, c. 1905

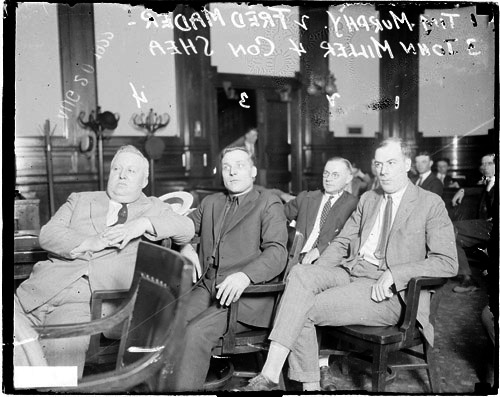
Informal portrait of (left to right) Cornelius P. Shea, John Miller, Fred Mader, and Tim Murphy sitting in a row in a courtroom in Chicago, Illinois, during a labor trial. Murphy was a politician, union organizer, and reputed gangster, and he was murdered in 1928.

The union, like most unions within the AFL at the time, had a largely decentralized structure, with a number of local unions that governed themselves autonomously and tended to look only after their own interests in the geographical jurisdiction in which they operated. The teamsters were vitally important to the labor movement, for a strike or sympathy strike by the teamsters could paralyze the movement of goods throughout a city and bring a strike into nearly every neighborhood. It also meant that teamsters leaders were able to demand bribes in order to avoid strikes, and control of a teamsters local could bring organized crime significant revenues. During Shea's presidency, the entire teamsters union was notoriously corrupt.

Several major strikes occupied the union in its first three years. In November 1903, teamsters employed by the Chicago City Railway went out on strike. Shea attempted to stop sympathy strikes by other teamster locals, but three locals walked out and eventually disaffiliated over the sympathy-strike issue. A sympathy strike in support of 18,000 striking meat cutters in Chicago in July 1904 led to riots before the extensive use of strikebreakers led Shea to force his members back to work (leading to the collapse of the meat cutters' strike). In the midst of the strife in 1904, the teamsters convention in Cincinnati, Ohio, re-elected Shea by acclamation on August 8, 1904. Under his leadership, the union had expanded to nearly 50,000 members in 821 locals in 300 cities, making the Teamsters one of the largest unions in the United States.

In 1905, 10,000 teamsters struck in support of locked-out tailors at Montgomery Ward, and eventually more than 25,000 teamsters manned the picket lines. But when local newspapers discovered that Shea was living in a local brothel, kept a 19-year-old waitress as a mistress, and had spent the strike hosting parties, public support for the strike collapsed, and the strike ended on August 1, 1905. Despite the revelations, Shea won re-election on August 12, 1905, by a vote of 129 to 121.

Shea was re-elected again in 1905 and 1906, although significant challenges to his presidency occurred each time. Shea's first trial on charges stemming from the 1905 Montgomery Ward strike ended in a mistrial. However, during the 1906 re-election Shea had promised that he would resign the presidency once his trial had ended. But he did not, and most union members withdrew their support for him. Daniel J. Tobin of Boston was elected Shea's successor by a vote of 104 to 94 in August 1907.

=== Organizing and growth during the Great Depression ===
Tobin was president of the Teamsters from 1907 to 1952. Although he faced opposition in his re-election races in 1908, 1909 and 1910, he never faced opposition again until his retirement in 1952.

The Teamsters began to expand dramatically and mature organizationally under Tobin. He pushed for the development of "joint councils" to which all local unions were forced to affiliate. Varying in geographical and industrial jurisdiction, the joint councils became important incubators for up-and-coming leadership and negotiating master agreements which covered all employers in a given industry. Tobin also actively discouraged strikes in order to bring discipline to the union and encourage employers to sign contracts, and founded and edited the union magazine, the International Teamster. Under Tobin, the Teamsters also first developed the "regional conference" system (developed by Dave Beck in Seattle), which provided stability, organizing strength, and leadership to the international union.

Tobin undertook long jurisdictional battles with many unions during this period. Fierce disputes occurred between the Teamsters and the Gasoline State Operators' National Council (an AFL federal union of gas station attendants), the International Longshoremen's Association, the Retail Clerks International Union, and the Brotherhood of Railway Clerks. The most significant disagreement, however, was with the United Brewery Workers over the right to represent beer wagon drivers. While the Teamsters lost this battle in 1913, when the AFL awarded jurisdiction to the Brewers, they won when the issue came before the AFL Executive Board again in 1933, when the Brewers were still recovering from their near-elimination during Prohibition. The raids and new member organizing in the 1930s led to significant membership increases. Teamster membership stood at just 82,000 in 1932. Tobin took advantage of the wave of pro-union sentiment engendered by the passage of the National Industrial Recovery Act, and by 1935 union membership had increased nearly 65 percent to 135,000. By 1941, Tobin had a dues-paying membership of 530,000—making the Teamsters the fastest-growing labor union in the United States.

One of the most significant events in union history occurred in 1934. A group of radicals in Local 574 in Minneapolis—led by Farrell Dobbs, Carl Skoglund, and the Dunne brothers (Ray, Miles and Grant), all members of the Trotskyist Communist League of America—began successfully organizing coal truck drivers in the winter of 1933. Tobin, an ardent anti-communist, opposed their efforts and refused to support their 1933 strike. Local 574 struck again in 1934, leading to several riots over a nine-day period in May. When the employers' association reneged on the agreement, Local 574 resumed the strike, although it ended again after nine days when martial law was declared by Governor Floyd B. Olson. Although Local 574 won a contract recognizing the union and which broke the back of the anti-union Citizens Alliance in Minneapolis, Tobin expelled Local 574 from the Teamsters. Member outrage was extensive, and in August 1936 he was forced to recharter the local as 544. Within a year the newly formed Local 544 had organized 250,000 truckers in the Midwest and formed the Central Conference of Teamsters.

Extensive organizing also occurred in the West. Harry Bridges, radical leader of the International Longshoremen's and Warehousemen's Union (ILWU), was leading "the march inland"—an attempt to organize warehouse workers away from shipping ports. Alarmed by Bridges's radical politics and worried that the ILWU would encroach on Teamster jurisdictions, Dave Beck formed a large regional organization (the Western Conference of Teamsters) to engage in fierce organizing battles and membership raids against the ILWU which led to the establishment of many new locals and the organization of tens of thousands of new members.

But corruption became even more widespread in the Teamsters during the Tobin administration. By 1941, the union was considered the most corrupt in the United States, and the most abusive towards its own members. Tobin vigorously defended the union against such accusations, but also instituted many constitutional and organizational changes and practices which made it easier for union officials to engage in criminal offenses.

=== World War II and the post-war period ===
By the beginning of World War II, the Teamsters was one of the most powerful unions in the country, and Teamster leaders were influential in the corridors of power. Union membership had risen more than 390 percent between 1935 and 1941 to 530,000. In June 1940, President Franklin D. Roosevelt appointed Tobin to be the official White House liaison to organized labor, and later that year chair of the Labor Division of the Democratic National Committee. In 1942, President Roosevelt appointed Tobin special representative to the United Kingdom and charged him with investigating the state of the labor movement there. Tobin was considered three times for Secretary of Labor, and twice refused the post—in 1943 and 1947. On September 23, 1944, Roosevelt gave his famous "Fala speech" while campaigning in the 1944 presidential election. Because of Roosevelt's strong relationship with Tobin and the union's large membership, the president delivered his speech before the Teamster convention.

Nonetheless, Teamsters members were restive. Dissident members of the union accused the leadership of suppressing democracy in the union, a charge Tobin angrily denied. Over the next year, Tobin cracked down on dissidents and several large locals led by his political opponents.

During World War II, The Teamsters strongly endorsed the American labor movement's no-strike pledge. The Teamsters agreed to cease raiding other unions and not strike for the duration of the national emergency. Tobin even ordered Teamsters members to cross picket lines put up by other unions. Nevertheless, the national leadership sanctioned strikes by Midwestern truckers in August 1942, Southern truckers in October 1943, and brewery workers and milk delivery drivers in January 1945. The Teamsters did not, however, participate in the great post-war wave of labor strikes. In the two years following the cessation of hostilities, the Teamsters struck only three times: 10,000 truckers in New Jersey struck for two weeks; workers at UPS struck nationwide for three weeks; and workers at Railway Express Agency struck for almost a month.

Teamsters leaders strongly opposed enactment of the Taft–Hartley Act and repeatedly called for its repeal. Tobin, however, was one of the first labor leaders to sign the non-communist affidavit required by the law.

The great wave of organizing in which the union engaged during the Great Depression and the war years significantly boosted the political power of a number of regional Teamsters leaders, and the leadership of the union engaged in a number of power struggles in the post-war period. By 1949, the union's membership had topped one million. Dave Beck (elected an international vice-president in 1940) was increasingly influential in the international union, and Tobin attempted to check his growing power but failed. In 1946, Beck successfully overcame Tobin's opposition and won approval of an amendment to the union's constitution creating the post of executive vice-president. Beck then won the 1947 election to fill the position. Beck also successfully opposed in 1947 a Tobin-backed dues increase to fund new organizing. The following year, Beck was able to demand the ouster of the editor of International Teamster magazine and install his own man in the job.

In 1948, Beck allied with his long-time rival Jimmy Hoffa and effectively seized control of the union. He announced a raid on the International Association of Machinists local at Boeing. Although Tobin publicly repudiated Beck's actions, Beck had more than enough support from Hoffa and other members of the executive board to force Tobin to back down. Five months later, Beck won approval of a plan to dissolve the union's four divisions and replace them with 16 divisions organized around each of the major job categories in the union's membership. In 1951, Tom Hickey, reformist leader of the Teamsters in New York City, won election to the Teamsters executive board. Tobin needed Beck's support to prevent Hickey's election, and Beck refused to give it.

On September 4, 1952, Tobin announced he would step down as president of the Teamsters at the end of his term. At the union's 1952 convention, Beck was elected General President and pushed through a number of changes intended to make it harder for a challenger to build the necessary majority to unseat a president or reject his policies.

=== Influence of organized crime ===
Beck was elected to the Executive Council of the AFL on August 13, 1953, but his election generated a tremendous political battle between AFL President George Meany, who supported his election, and federation vice presidents who felt Beck was corrupt and should not be elected to the post. Beck was the first Teamster president to negotiate a nationwide master contract and a national grievance arbitration plan, established organizing drives in the Deep South and the East, and built the current Teamsters headquarters (the "Marble Palace") in Washington, D.C., on Louisiana Avenue NW (across a small plaza from the United States Senate). But his intervention in a construction and a milk strike (both centered in New York City), and refusal to intervene in a Northeastern trucking strike created major political problems for him. Perceiving Beck to be weak, Jimmy Hoffa began challenging Beck on various union decisions and policies in 1956 with an eye to unseating him as General President in the regularly scheduled union elections in 1957.

Infiltration by organized crime dominated the agenda of the Teamsters throughout the 1950s. The Teamsters had suffered from extensive corruption since its formation in 1903. Although the more extreme, public forms of corruption had been eliminated after General President Cornelius Shea was removed from office, the extent of corruption and control by organized crime increased during Tobin's time in office (1907 to 1952). In 1929, the Teamsters and unions in Chicago even approached gangster Roger Touhy and asked for his protection from Al Capone and his Chicago Outfit, which were seeking to control the area's unions. Evidence of widespread corruption within the Teamsters began emerging shortly after Tobin retired. In Kansas City, corrupt Teamsters locals spent years seeking bribes, embezzling money, and engaging in extensive extortion and labor rackets as well as beatings, vandalism and even bombings in an attempt to control the construction and trucking industries. The problem was so serious that the U.S. House of Representatives held hearings on the issue.

Hoffa's attempt to challenge Beck caused a major national scandal which led to two Congressional investigations, several indictments for fraud and other crimes against Beck and Hoffa, strict new federal legislation and regulations regarding labor unions, and even helped launch the political career of Robert F. Kennedy. Believing he needed additional votes to unseat Beck, in October 1956 Hoffa met with mobster Johnny Dio in New York City and the two men conspired to create as many as 15 paper locals (Note: A "paper local" is a local union, chartered by an international union or self-chartered, established for the purposes of fraud. It may have no members; the "members" may be relatives or individuals involved in organized crime rather than workers; or the union may claim to represent workers but in fact no relationship has been established. The holder of the charter for the paper local charter often enters into a sweetheart contract with an employer, or uses it as extortion (threatening to unionize the workers unless he receives a payoff). Paper locals are denounced by the AFL-CIO Code of Ethical Practices.) to boost Hoffa's delegate totals. When the paper locals applied for charters from the international union, Hoffa's political foes were outraged. A major battle broke out within the Teamsters over whether to charter the locals, and the media attention led to inquiries by the U.S. Department of Justice and the Permanent Subcommittee on Investigations of the U.S. Senate Committee on Government Operations. Beck and other Teamster leaders challenged the authority of the U.S. Senate to investigate the union, which caused the Senate to establish the Select Committee on Improper Activities in Labor and Management—a new committee with broad subpoena and investigative powers. Senator John L. McClellan, chair of the select committee, hired Robert F. Kennedy as the subcommittee's chief counsel and investigator.

The Select Committee (also known as the McClellan Committee, after its chairman), exposed widespread corruption in the Teamsters union. Dave Beck fled the country for a month to avoid its subpoenas before returning. Four of the paper locals were dissolved to avoid committee scrutiny, several Teamster staffers were charged with contempt of Congress, and union records were lost or destroyed (allegedly on purpose), and wiretaps were played in public before a national television audience in which Dio and Hoffa discussed the creation of even more paper locals. Evidence was unearthed of a mob-sponsored plot in which Oregon Teamsters unions would seize control of the state legislature, state police, and state attorney general's office through bribery, extortion and blackmail. Initially, members of the union did not believe the charges, and support for Beck was strong, but after three months of continuous allegations of wrongdoing many rank-and-file Teamsters withdrew their support and openly called for Beck to resign. Beck initially refused to address the allegations, but broke his silence and denounced the committee's inquiry on March 6. But even as the committee conducted its investigation, the Teamsters chartered even more paper locals. In mid-March 1957, Jimmy Hoffa was arrested for allegedly trying to bribe a Senate aide. Hoffa denied the charges, but the arrest triggered additional investigations and more arrests and indictments over the following weeks. A week later, Beck admitted to receiving an interest-free $300,000 loan from the Teamsters which he had never repaid, and Senate investigators claimed that loans to Beck and other union officials (and their businesses) had cost the union more than $700,000. Beck appeared before the select committee for the first time on March 25, 1957, and invoked his Fifth Amendment right against self-incrimination 117 times. The McClellan Committee turned its focus to Hoffa and other Teamsters officials, and presented testimony and evidence alleging widespread corruption in Hoffa-controlled Teamster units.

Several historic legal developments came out of the select committee's investigation. The scandals uncovered by the McClellan committee, which affected not only the Teamsters but several other unions, led directly to the passage of the Labor-Management Reporting and Disclosure Act (also known as the Landrum-Griffin Act) in 1959. The right of union officials to exercise their Fifth Amendment rights was upheld, and a significant refinement of constitutional law made, when the U.S. Supreme Court reaffirmed the right of union officials not to divulge the location of union records in Curcio v. United States, 354 U.S. 118 (1957).

Rank-and-file anger over the McClellan Committee's revelations eventually led Beck to retire from the Teamsters, which allowed Jimmy Hoffa to take over. Immediately after his testimony in late March 1957, Beck won approval from the union's executive board to establish a $1 million fund to defend himself and the union from the committee's allegations. But member outrage at the expenditure was significant, and permission to establish the fund was rescinded. Member anger continued to grow throughout the spring, and Beck's majority support on the executive board vanished. Beck was called before the McClellan Committee again in early May 1957, and additional interest-free loans and other potentially illegal and unethical financial transactions exposed. Based on these revelations, Beck was indicted for tax evasion on May 2, 1957.

Beck's legal troubles led him to retire and Hoffa to win election to the union presidency. Support for Beck among the membership evaporated. Beck announced on May 25 he would not run for re-election in October. The announcement created chaos among the union leadership, and despite additional indictments Hoffa announced he would seek the presidency on July 19. Rank-and-file support for Hoffa was strong, although there were some attempts to organize an opposition candidate. Hoffa's opponents asked a federal judge to postpone the election, but the request was granted only temporarily and Hoffa was elected General President of the union on October 4, 1957. Beck offered to retire early to allow Hoffa to take control of the union in December. A federal district court barred Hoffa from taking power unless he was acquitted in his wiretapping trial. The ruling was upheld by a court of appeals, and the trial ended in a hung jury on December 19, 1957. Hoffa assumed the presidency on February 1, 1958.

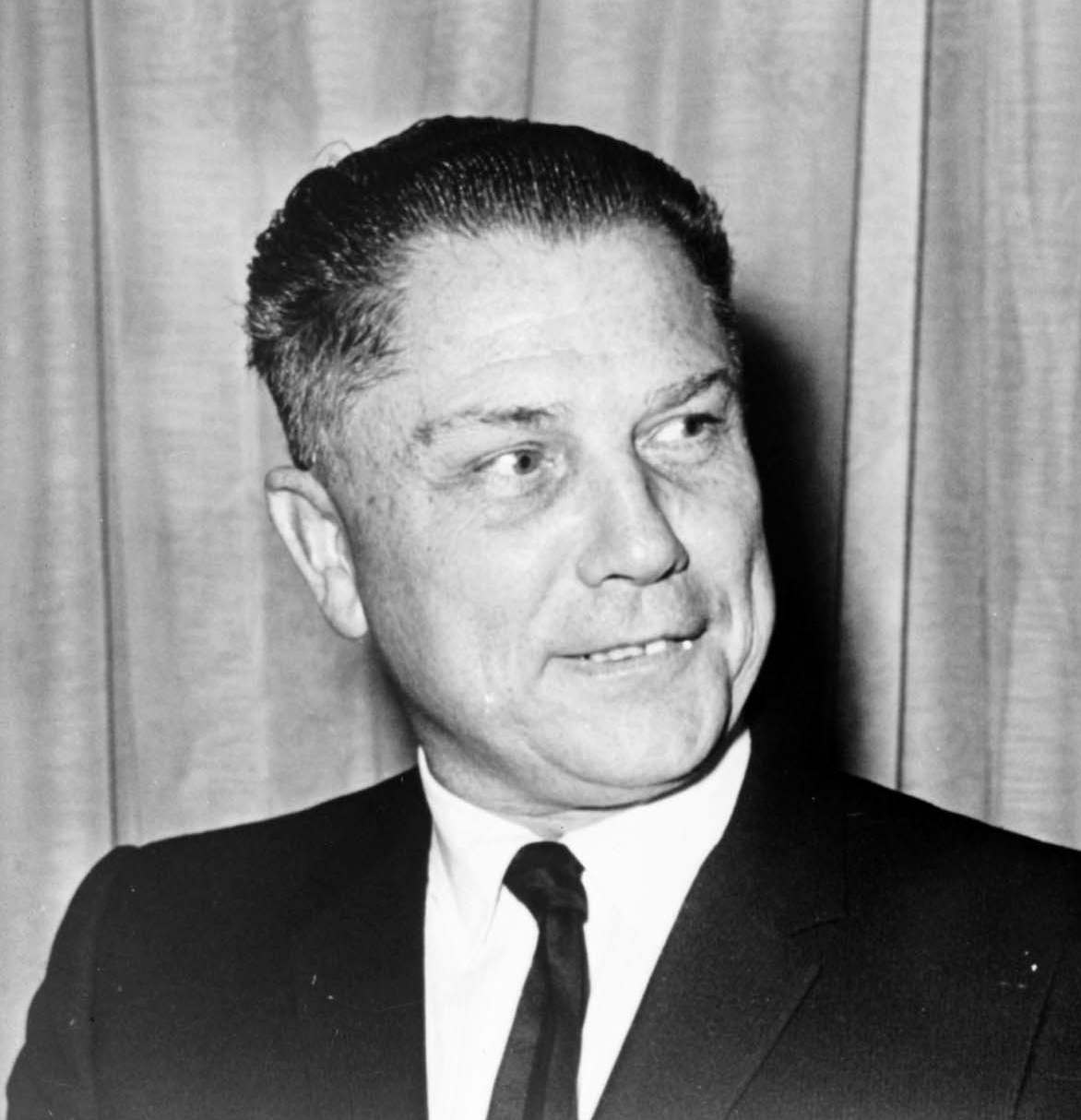
Jimmy Hoffa served as President from 1957 to 1971.

The worsening corruption scandal led the AFL–CIO to eject the Teamsters. AFL–CIO President George Meany, worried that corruption scandals plaguing a number of unions at the time might lead to harsh regulation of unions or even the withdrawal of federal labor law protection, began an anti-corruption drive in April 1956. New rules were enacted by the labor federation's executive council that provided for the removal of vice presidents engaged in corruption as well as the ejection of unions considered corrupt. The McClellan Committee's investigation only worsened the dispute between the AFL–CIO and the Teamsters. In January 1957, the AFL–CIO proposed a new rule which would bar officers of the federation from continuing to hold office if they exercised their Fifth Amendment rights in a corruption investigation. Beck opposed the new rule, but the Ethical Practices Committee of AFL–CIO instituted the rule on January 31, 1957. The Teamsters were given 90 days to reform, but Beck retaliated by promising more raids on AFL–CIO member unions if the union was ousted. Beck's opposition prompted a successful move by Meany to remove Beck from the AFL–CIO executive council on the grounds of corruption. After extensive hearings and appeals which lasted from July to September 1957, the AFL–CIO voted on September 25, 1957, to eject the Teamsters if the union did not institute reforms within 30 days. Beck refused to institute any reforms, and the election of Jimmy Hoffa (whom the AFL–CIO considered as corrupt as Beck) led the labor federation to suspend the Teamsters union on October 24, 1957. Meany offered to keep the Teamsters within the AFL–CIO if Hoffa resigned as president, but Hoffa refused and the formal expulsion occurred on December 6, 1957.

The Teamsters were not the only corrupt union in the AFL–CIO by any means. Another was the International Longshoremen's Association (ILA), which represented stevedores in most East Coast ports. The Teamsters had long desired to bring all shipping and transportation workers into the union, so that no product could be moved anywhere in the United States without it being touched by Teamsters hands. As the ILA came under increasing attack for permitting corruption in its locals, Beck sought to bring the ILA into the Teamsters. The AFL ousted the ILA in September 1953, and formed the International Brotherhood of Longshoremen-AFL (IBL-AFL) to represent longshoremen on the Great Lakes and East Coast. The Teamsters planned to raid the expelled union, and may even have hoped to seize control of the IBL-AFL. Beck undertook a campaign to bring the ILA back into the AFL in early 1955, but the election of mob associate Anthony "Tough Tony" Anastasio as an ILA vice president forced Beck to end the effort. But even as Beck backed away from any ILA deal, Jimmy Hoffa secretly negotiated a major package of financial and staff aid to the ILA and then went public with the deal—forcing Beck to accept it as a fait accompli or risk embarrassing Hoffa. The AFL–CIO threatened to expel the Teamsters if it aided the ILA. Beck fought Hoffa over the ILA aid package and won, withdrawing the offer to the ILA in the spring of 1956.

The ILA was not the only union the Teamsters sought to merge with. The union attempted to merge with the Mine, Mill & Smelter Workers in 1955, but the effort failed. The union also sought a merger with the Brewery Workers, but the smaller union rejected the offer. When the overture failed, the Teamsters raided the Brewery Workers, leading to fierce protests by the CIO.

Raiding by the Teamsters was such a serious issue that it prompted the AFL and CIO, which had attempted to sign a no-raid agreement for years, to finally negotiate and implement such a pact in December 1953. Beck initially refused to sign the agreement, and threatened to take the Teamsters out of the AFL if forced to adhere to it. Three months after the pact was signed, the Teamsters agreed to submit to the terms of the no-raid agreement. Shortly thereafter, the AFL adopted Article 20 of its constitution, which prevented its member unions from raiding one another. The union's affection for raiding led it to initially oppose the AFL–CIO merger in January 1955, but it quickly reversed itself.

=== Rise, fall, and disappearance of Jimmy Hoffa ===
Hoffa achieved his goal of unifying all freight drivers under a single collective bargaining agreement, the National Master Freight Agreement, in 1964. Hoffa used the grievance procedures of the agreement, which authorized selective strikes against particular employers, to police the agreement or, if Hoffa thought that it served the union's interest, to drive marginal employers out of the industry. The union won substantial gains for its members, fostering a nostalgic image of the Hoffa era as the golden age for Teamster drivers. Hoffa also succeeded where Tobin had failed, concentrating power at the international level, dominating the conferences which Beck and Dobbs had helped build.

In addition, Hoffa was instrumental in using the assets of the Teamsters' pension plans, particularly the Central States plan, to support Mafia projects, such as the development of Las Vegas in the 1950s and 1960s. Pension funds were loaned to finance Las Vegas casinos such as the Stardust Resort & Casino, the Fremont Hotel & Casino, the Desert Inn, the Dunes hotel and casino (which was controlled by Hoffa's attorney, Morris Shenker), the Four Queens, the Aladdin Hotel & Casino, Circus Circus, and Caesars Palace. The pension fund also made a number of loans to associates and relatives of high-ranking Teamster officials. A close associate of Hoffa during this period was Allen Dorfman. Dorfman owned an insurance agency that provided insurance claims processing to the Teamsters' union, and which was the subject of an investigation by the McClellan Committee. Dorfman also had increasing influence over loans made by the Teamsters' pension fund, and after Hoffa went to prison in 1967, Dorfman had primary control over the fund. Dorfman was murdered in January 1983, shortly after his conviction, along with Teamsters' president Roy Lee Williams, in a bribery case.

Hoffa was moreover defiantly unwilling to reform the union or limit his own power in response to the attacks from Robert F. Kennedy, formerly chief counsel to the McClellan Committee, and later Attorney General. Kennedy's Department of Justice tried to convict Hoffa for a variety of offenses during the 1960s, finally succeeding on a witness tampering charge in 1964, with key testimony provided by Teamsters business agent Edward Grady Partin. After exhausting his appeals, Hoffa entered prison in 1967.

Hoffa installed Frank Fitzsimmons, an associate from his days in Local 299 in Detroit, to hold his place for him while he served time. Fitzsimmons, however, began to enjoy the exercise of power in Hoffa's absence; in addition, the organized crime figures around him found that he was more pliant than Hoffa had been. While President Nixon's pardon barred Hoffa from resuming any role in the Teamsters until 1980, Hoffa challenged the legality of that condition and planned to run again for presidency of the union, but disappeared in 1975 under mysterious circumstances. He is presumed dead, although his body has never been found.

=== Decentralization, deregulation and drift ===
Under General President Frank Fitzsimmons, authority within the Teamsters was decentralized back into the hands of regional, joint council, and local leaders. While this helped solidify Fitzsimmons's own political position in the union, it also made it more difficult for the union to act decisively on policy issues. Fitzsimmons also slowly moved the union's political stances to the left, supporting universal health care, an immediate end to the Vietnam War, urban renewal, and community organizing. In 1968, Fitzsimmons and United Auto Workers President Walter Reuther formed the Alliance for Labor Action, a new national trade union center which competed with the AFL–CIO. The Alliance dissolved in 1972 after Reuther's death. While the Teamsters won rich national master contracts in trucking and package delivery in the 1970s, it did little to adapt to the changes occurring in the transportation industry.

A major jurisdictional battle with the United Farm Workers (UFW) broke out in 1970, and did not end until 1977. The Teamsters and UFW had both claimed jurisdiction over farm workers for many years, and in 1967 had signed an agreement settling their differences. But decentralization of power within the union led several Teamster leaders in California to repudiate this agreement without Fitzsimmons's permission and organize large numbers of field workers. His hand forced, Fitzsimmons ordered Teamsters contract negotiators to re-open the handful of contracts it had signed with California growers. The UFW sued, the AFL–CIO condemned the action, and many employers negotiated contracts with the Teamsters rather than with the UFW. The Teamsters subsequently signed contracts (which many denounced as sweetheart deals) with more than 375 California growers. Although an agreement giving UFW jurisdiction over field workers and the Teamsters jurisdiction over packing and warehouse workers was reached on September 27, 1973, Fitzsimmons reneged on the agreement within a month and moved ahead with forming a farm workers regional union in California. The organizing battles even became violent at times. By 1975, the UFW had won 24 elections and the Teamsters 14; UFW membership had plummeted to just 6,000 from nearly 70,000 while the Teamsters farmworker division counted 55,000 workers. The UFW signed an agreement with Fitzsimmons in March 1977 in which the UFW agreed to seek to organize only those workers covered by the California Agricultural Labor Relations Act, while the Teamsters retained jurisdiction over some agricultural workers, who had been covered by Teamsters Local Union contracts prior to the formation of the UFW.

In October 1973, Fitzsimmons ended the long-running jurisdictional dispute with the United Brewery Workers, and the Brewery Workers merged with the Teamsters.

In 1979 Congress passed legislation that deregulated the freight industry, removing the Interstate Commerce Commission's power to impose detailed regulatory tariffs on interstate carriers. The union tried to fight deregulation by attempting to bribe Senator Howard Cannon of Nevada. That attempt not only failed, but resulted in the conviction in 1982 of Roy Williams, the General President who had succeeded Fitzsimmons in 1981. Williams subsequently resigned in 1983 as a condition of remaining free on bail while his appeal proceeded.

Deregulation had catastrophic effects on the Teamsters, opening up the industry to competition from non-union companies who sought to cut costs by avoiding unionization and curbing wages. Nearly 200 unionized carriers went out of business in the first few years of deregulation, leaving thirty percent of Teamsters in the freight division unemployed. The remaining unionized carriers demanded concessions in wages, work rules, and hours.

Williams's successor, Jackie Presser, was prepared to grant most of these concessions in the form of a special freight "relief rider" that would cut wages by up to 35 percent and establish two-tier wages. Teamsters for a Democratic Union, which had grown out of efforts to reject the 1976 freight agreement, launched a successful national campaign to defeat the relief rider, which was defeated by a vote of 94,086 to 13,082.

The pressure on the freight industry and the national freight agreement continued, however. By the end of the 1990s the National Master Freight Agreement, which had covered 500,000 drivers in the late 1970s, dropped to fewer than 200,000, with numerous local riders weakening it further in some areas.

=== Internal and external challenges ===
The decline in working conditions in the freight industry, combined with long-simmering unhappiness among members employed by the United Parcel Service, led to the development of two nationwide dissident groups within the union in the 1980s: Teamsters for a Democratic Union (TDU), an assemblage of a number of local efforts, and the Professional Drivers Council, better known as PROD, which began as a public interest group affiliated with Ralph Nader that was concerned with worker safety. The two groups merged in 1979.

TDU was able to win some local offices within the union, although the International Union often attempted to make those victories meaningless by marginalizing the officer or the union. TDU acquired greater prominence, however, with the election reforms forced on the union by the consent decree it had entered into in 1989 on the eve of trial on a suit brought by the federal government under the Racketeer Influenced and Corrupt Organizations Act (RICO).

The decree required the direct election of International officers by the membership, as TDU had been demanding for years leading up to the decree, to replace the indirect election by delegates at the union's convention. While the delegates at the union's 1991 convention balked at amending the Constitution, they ultimately capitulated under pressure from the government.

That consent decree might not have been possible, however, if it had not been for the testimony of Roy Williams, who described, in an affidavit he gave the government in return for a delay of his imprisonment, his own dealings with organized crime as the Secretary-Treasurer of a local union in Kansas City and as an officer of the International Union. The decree also gave the government the power to install an Independent Review Board with the power to expel any member of the union for "conduct unbecoming to the union", which the IRB proceeded to exercise far more aggressively than the Teamsters officials who had agreed to the decree had expected.

While the government was pursuing a civil case against the union as an entity, it was also indicting Presser, who had succeeded Williams as General President, for embezzling from two different local unions in Cleveland prior to his election as president. Presser resigned in 1988, but died before his trial was scheduled to begin. He was succeeded by William J. McCarthy, who came from the same local that Dan Tobin had led eighty years earlier.

The Independent Review Board (IRB) is a three-member panel established to investigate and take appropriate action with respect to "any allegations of corruption", "any allegations of domination or control or influence" of any part of the Union by organized crime, and any failure to cooperate fully with the IRB.

=== Recent history ===
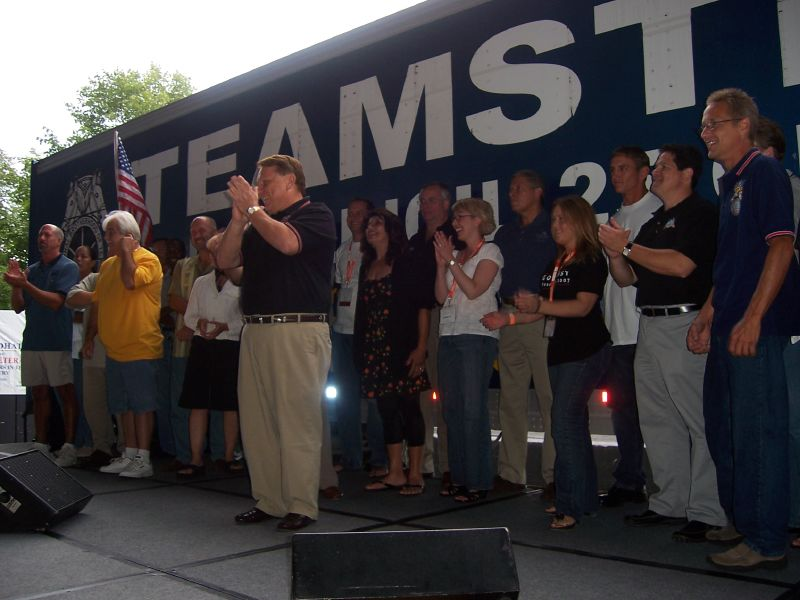
A Teamsters gathering at the YearlyKos 2007 convention

View source data.
View source data.

In 1991, Ron Carey won a surprising victory in the first direct election for General President in the union's history, defeating two "old guard" candidates, R.V. Durham and Walter Shea. Carey's slate, supported by TDU, also won nearly all of the seats on the International Executive Board.

Carey acquired a fair amount of influence within the AFL–CIO, which had readmitted the Teamsters in 1985. Carey was close with the new leadership elected in 1995, particularly Richard Trumka of the United Mine Workers of America, who became Secretary-Treasurer of the AFL–CIO under John Sweeney. Carey had also swung the Teamsters support behind the Democratic Party, a change from past administrations that had supported the Republican Party. The new administration set out to break from the past in other ways, making energetic efforts to head off a vote to oust the union as representative of Northwest Airlines' flight attendants, negotiating a breakthrough agreement covering carhaulers, and supporting local strikes, such as the one against Diamond Walnut, to restore the union's strength.

The Carey administration did not, on the other hand, have much power in the lower reaches of the Teamster hierarchy: all of the large regional conferences were run by "old guard" officers, as were most of the locals. Disagreements between those two camps led the old guard to campaign against the Carey administration's proposed dues increase. The Carey administration retaliated by dissolving the regional conferences, calling them expensive redundancies and fiefdoms for old guard union officers, and rearranging the boundaries of some joint councils that had fought against the dues increase.

The opposition responded by uniting around a single candidate, James P. Hoffa, son of James R. Hoffa, to run against Carey in 1996. Hoffa ran a strong campaign, trading on the mystique still attached to his late father's name and promising to restore those days of glory. Carey appeared, however, to have won a close election.

Shortly afterward in 1997, the union initiated a large and successful strike against UPS. The parcel services department had by that time become the largest division in the union.

Carey was removed from the union's leadership by the IRB shortly thereafter, when evidence that individuals in his office had arranged for transfer of several thousand dollars to an outside contractor, which then arranged for another entity to make an equivalent contribution to the Carey campaign. Carey was indicted for lying to investigators about his campaign funding but was acquitted of all charges in a 2001 trial.

In the 1998 election to succeed Carey, James P. Hoffa was elected handily. He became president of the Teamsters on March 19, 1999, and took the union in a more moderate direction, tempering the union's support for Democrats and attempting to come to terms with powerful Republicans in Congress.

The union has merged in recent years with a number of unions from other industries, including the Graphic Communications International Union, a printing industry union, and the Brotherhood of Maintenance of Way Employes and Brotherhood of Locomotive Engineers, both from the railway industry.

On July 25, 2005, the Teamsters disaffiliated from the AFL–CIO and became a founding member of the new national trade union center, the Change to Win Federation.

In 2009, UPS, many employees of which are members of the Teamsters, lobbied to have language added to the FAA Reauthorization Act of 2009 (H.R. 915) to change how UPS and FedEx compete with one another. In response, FedEx launched a large, online advertising campaign aimed at UPS and the Teamsters, called 'Stop the Brown Bailout'.

In December 2022, the Biden administration announced a nearly $36 billion grant to the Central States Pension Fund, which supports 350,000 Teamster workers and retirees across the country. These funds, appropriated as part of the 2021 American Rescue Plan, represented the largest federal aid bailout of a pension fund in history and prevented imminent steep benefit reductions. In September 2024, the Teamsters, which has endorsed Democratic presidential candidates since the 2000 election, decided not to endorse a candidate in the upcoming U.S. presidential election. This would mark the first time since 1996 that the union would not make an endorsement in a presidential election. The decision came after a poll of rank-and-file Teamsters members found that almost 60% supported Republican candidate Donald Trump to 34% supporting Democratic candidate Kamala Harris.

== Internal Teamsters politics ==
Prior to the 1970s, no long-lived caucuses existed within the Teamsters Union. Challengers for office ran on their personal appeal and individual power base, rather than on caucus or "party" platforms and such challenges were infrequent. The Teamster leadership was well-established and somewhat self-perpetuating, and challengers only rarely achieved victories at the local and even less frequently at the regional levels. This changed in the 1970s. A national wildcat strike challenged President Frank Fitzsimmons's control over the union, but failed. After the strike, a reform movement known as "Teamsters United Rank and File" (TURF) formed to continue to challenge against the union's national leadership. But TURF collapsed after a few years due to internal dissent. In 1975, two new caucuses formed: Teamsters for a Decent Contract (TDC) and UPSurge. Both groups pushed the national leadership for vastly improved contracts at UPS and the freight lines.

In 1976 a new formal caucus, Teamsters for a Democratic Union (TDU), formed when TDC and UPSurge merged. The new caucus's goal was to make internal Teamster governance more transparent and democratic, which included giving rank-and-file more of a say in the terms and approval of contracts.

In the 1980s, TDU occasionally won elections for positions on local councils, but it was not until 1983—when the TDU forced President Jackie Presser to withdraw and make changes to a concession-laden National Master Freight Agreement—that TDU had a national impact. TDU publicized the very centralized and not very transparent national union decision-making process, criticized what it said was lack of member input into these decisions, and published contract, salary, membership, and other data critical of the national union leadership. These criticisms led to another success for TDU, with many TDU proposals finding their way into the 1988 court decree in which the federal government took over of the Teamsters. Although the TDU has never won the presidency of the national union as of mid-2013, it strongly supported Ron Carey for the presidency in 1991. Carey, in turn, adopted many of TDU's reform proposals as part of his platform. Carey ran with nearly a full slate (which included a candidate for secretary-treasurer and 13 vice presidencies). R.V. Durham, leader of the Teamsters in North Carolina, was considered the "establishment" candidate and front-runner in the campaign (he had the backing of a majority of the union's executive board). A second candidate in the race, Walter Shea, was a veteran union staffer from Washington, D.C. Carey won with 48.5 percent of the vote to Durham's 33.2 percent and Shea's 18.3 percent. (Turnout was low, only about 32 percent of the union's total membership.) Carey's election, sociologist Charlotte Ryan says, was another success for TDU (even though Carey was not a TDU candidate).

Carey won re-election in 1996 in a corrupt election, defeating James P. Hoffa (son of the former union president). Prior to entering the race, Hoffa formed a caucus of his own, the "Hoffa Unity Slate", to counter the grassroots organizing of TDU and Carey. Carey was later ousted as union president by U.S. government officials. A re-run election in 1998 saw Hoffa and the Unity Slate easily defeat TDU candidate Tom Leedham 54.5 percent to 39.3 percent (with 28 percent turnout).

Hoffa was re-elected over Leedham (again running on the TDU platform) in 2001, 64.8 percent to 35.2 percent. Leedham challenged Hoffa and the Hoffa Unity Slate a third time in 2006, losing 65 percent to 35 percent (with 25 percent turnout). Hoffa faced TDU candidate Sandy Pope, a local union president, in 2011. Also running, with a full slate of officer and vice presidential candidates, was former Hoffa supporter and former national vice president Fred Gegare. Hoffa again easily won re-election, earning 60 percent of the vote to Gregare's 23 percent and Pope's 17 percent. The Hoffa Unity Slate also won all five regional vice presidencies, although the slate's support declined across the board. Hoffa won reelection once more in 2016, this time against Teamsters United candidate Fred Zuckerman, but by a much narrower margin of 52 to 48 percent. The 2016 election was also the first time Hoffa-allied candidates lost regional vice presidencies to the Teamsters United reform slate.

In the 2021 election, Hoffa did not run for re-election. The Teamsters United slate, aligned with Teamsters for a Democratic Union, ran against the Teamsters Power Slate, endorsed by Hoffa. The Teamsters United slate, led by Sean O'Brien, won the election. O'Brien and his slate were sworn into office on March 22, 2022, at Teamsters headquarters in Washington, D.C. On the day his administration was installed, O'Brien fired more than 80 employees at the headquarters. He did not offer any severance or extension of benefits to the terminated staff. The International Brotherhood of Teamsters currently faces charges with the National Labor Relations Board in connection to the terminations. As of November 10, 2022, the union was required to pay eligible terminated employees more than $175,000 as part of a settlement with the District of Columbia Attorney General's Office for violating D.C. Code 32-1303.

== Political involvement ==
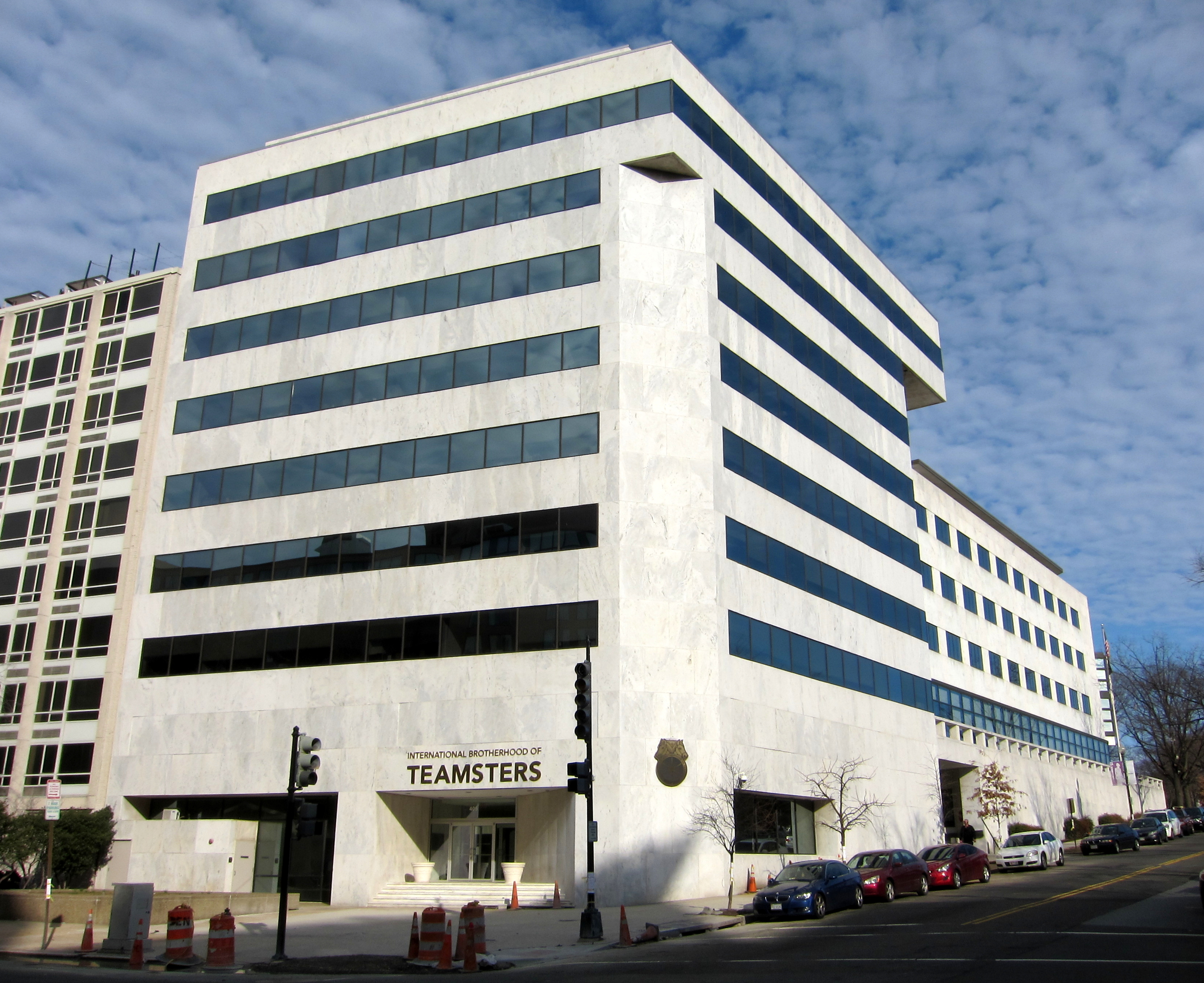
Teamsters headquarters located beside Capitol Hill in Washington, D.C.

The Teamsters Union is one of the largest labor unions in the world, as well as the 11th largest campaign contributor in the United States. While it supported Republicans Ronald Reagan and George H. W. Bush for president in the 1980s, it has leaned largely toward the Democrats since the 1990s; the Teamsters have donated 92% of their $24,418,589 in contributions since 1990 to the Democratic Party. Though the union opposed former President George W. Bush's agenda to open U.S. highways to Mexican truckers, it did previously support Bush's platform for oil drilling in the Arctic National Wildlife Refuge.

The Teamsters Union also makes an annual contribution to Friends of Sinn Féin — the U.S. fundraising arm of Irish republican party Sinn Féin.

On July 13, 2024, Teamsters president Sean M. O'Brien was announced as a headline speaker for the 2024 Republican National Convention. The organization requested to speak before the 2024 Democratic National Convention but says it was not invited to do so. On September 18, 2024, the organization announced that it would be endorsing neither of the two major party candidates of the 2024 presidential election: Democratic nominee Kamala Harris and Republican nominee Donald Trump. This marked the first election in nearly three decades in which the organization did not endorse a Democrat for president.

== Organization ==
=== General Presidents ===
- 1903: Cornelius Shea
- 1907: Daniel J. Tobin
- 1952: Dave Beck
- 1957: James R. Hoffa
- 1971: Frank Fitzsimmons
- 1981: George Mock (interim)
- 1981: Roy Williams
- 1983: Jackie Presser
- 1988: Weldon Mathis (interim)
- 1989: William J. McCarthy
- 1991: Ron Carey
- 1997: Tom Sever (interim)
- 1998: James P. Hoffa
- 2022: Sean M. O'Brien

=== General Secretary-Treasurers ===
1904: Edward L. Turley
1905: Thomas Hughes
1941: John M. Gillespie
1947: John F. English
1969: Thomas Flynn
1972: Murray W. Miller
1975: Raymond Schoessling
1985: Weldon Mathis
1991: Tom Sever
1999: Tom Keegel
2012: Ken Hall
2022: Fred Zuckerman

=== Membership ===
- 1933: 75,000 (Depression-era low)
- 1935: 146,000
- 1949: 1.0 million
- 1957: 1.5 million
- 1976: 2.0 million
- 1987: 1.0 million
- 2003: 1.7 million
- 2008: 1.4 million
- 2014: 1.2 million
- 2019: 1.4 million

=== Divisions and conferences ===
- Brewery and Soft Drink Conference
  - formerly the International Union of United Brewery, Flour, Cereal, Soft Drink and Distillery Workers
- Graphic Communications Conference
- Newspaper, Magazine and Electronic Media Workers Division
  - including some Mailers locals from the International Typographical Union
- Rail Conference
  - Brotherhood of Locomotive Engineers and Trainmen
  - Brotherhood of Maintenance of Way Employes
- Local 399 (founded 1928), represents workers in the film industry

== Archival collections ==
- International Brotherhood of Teamsters Labor History Research Center. At The George Washington University.
- International Brotherhood of Teamsters, Chauffeurs, Warehousemen, and Helpers of America records. 1950–1970. 2.83 cubic feet (4 boxes). At the Labor Archives of Washington, University of Washington Libraries Special Collections.
- Samuel B. Bassett Papers. 1926–1965. 3' linear. At the Labor Archives of Washington, University of Washington Libraries Special Collections.
- Brotherhood of Maintenance of Way Employees Records. 1899–2004. 360 linear feet (353 storage boxes, 2 manuscript boxes, 5 oversize). At the Walter P. Reuther Library.
- Jimmy Hoffa FBI Files. 1964–2002. 7 linear feet (7 storage boxes). At the Walter P. Reuther Library.

== See also ==
- 2009–10 Federal Aviation Administration Reauthorization Act dispute
- 1938 New York City truckers strike
- Teamsters Canada
- Ohio Conference of Teamsters
