= Lindsay Dougherty =

American union organizer

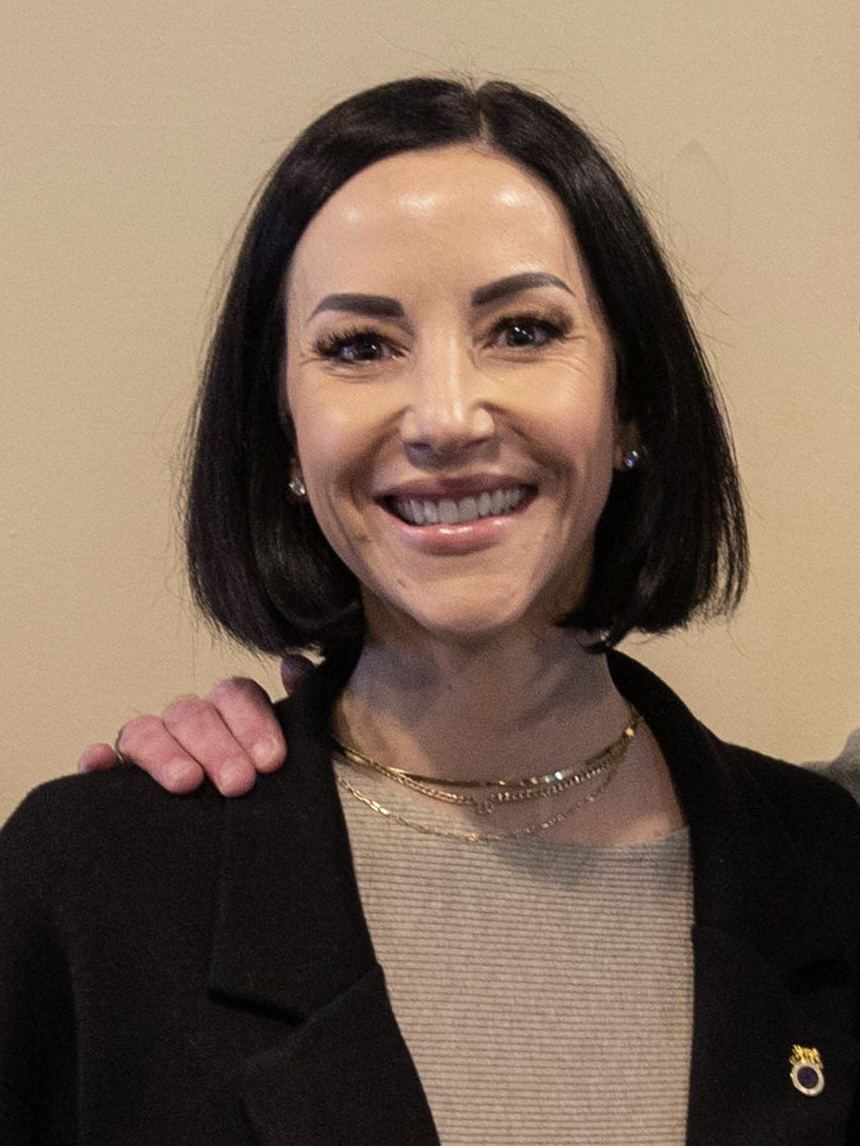
- Dougherty in 2023
- Born: 1983 or 1984 (age 42–43)
- Organization: International Brotherhood of Teamsters
- Title: Secretary-Treasurer of Teamsters Local 399; Director of the Teamsters Motion Picture and Theatrical Trade Division; Western Region Vice President

Lindsay Dougherty (born 1983 or 1984) is an American labor leader. Since May 2022, she has been Secretary-Treasurer of Teamsters Local 399. In that capacity she represents more than 6500 Hollywood workers. Dougherty is also director of the Teamsters Motion Picture and Theatrical Trade Division and Western Region Vice President of the International Brotherhood of Teamsters. In all three positions, she is the first woman to hold the role.

== Early life ==
Dougherty grew up in Detroit, where her father Pat Dougherty was a Teamster for 40 years and served as Secretary-Treasurer of Local 337.

== Career ==
As a teenager in 2001, Dougherty had her first job in the movie business as a background actor in the film 61*. She subsequently worked in transportation.

In 2006 Dougherty moved to Los Angeles and joined Local 399. In 2014 she became a business agent for the local, and the next year an organizer. In 2021, she served as the point person for the Teamsters’ negotiations with the Alliance of Motion Picture and Television Producers (AMPTP). The resulting contract secured a three-percent annual wage increase, as well as increased health and pension contributions.

In November 2021, while Recording Secretary of Local 399, Dougherty was elected Western Region Vice President of the International Brotherhood of Teamsters (IBT) on a slate with Sean O'Brien, in his successful campaign to become IBT President. She assumed the role on March 22, 2022, when she was also appointed by O’Brien to be director of the Teamsters’ Motion Picture and Theatrical Trade Division. When Steve Dayan retired in May 2022, Dougherty was appointed Secretary-Treasurer of Teamsters Local 399; she was re-elected on an unopposed slate in September 2022. In that capacity she represents more than 6500 Hollywood workers. In all three positions, Dougherty is the first woman to hold the role.

During the 2023 Writers Guild of America strike, Doughtery became "the strike's secret weapon", according to Vanity Fair. Notably she delivered a speech that drew a standing ovation for the line: "And what I’d like to say to the studios is, 'If you want to fuck around, you’re gonna find out.'"

== Personal life ==
Dougherty’s sister, husband, father-in-law and stepson are all Teamsters as well. She has a tattoo on her left arm of Jimmy Hoffa, who served as the president of the Teamsters from 1957 to 1971.
