= Cornelius Shea =

American labor leader (1872–1929)

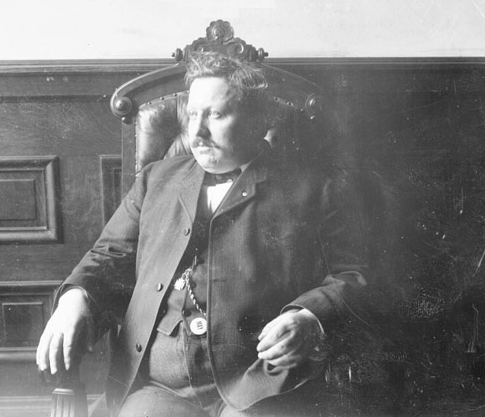
- Born: September 17, 1872; Cambridge, Massachusetts, U.S.
- Died: January 12, 1929 (aged 56); Chicago, Illinois, U.S.
- Occupation: Union leader
- Spouse: Mary Lyons
- Children: 2

Cornelius Patrick Shea (September 7, 1872 – January 12, 1929) was an American labor leader and organized crime figure. He was the founding president of the International Brotherhood of Teamsters, holding the position from 1903 until 1907. He became involved with the Chicago Outfit, and although he was indicted many times, he usually escaped conviction. After a short prison term for attempted murder removed him from union affairs, Shea was appointed secretary-treasurer of the Mafia-dominated Theatrical Janitors' Union in Chicago.

== Early life ==
Cornelius Shea was born in Cambridge, Massachusetts, on September 27, 1872, to James and Mary Shea, Irish immigrants. His father owned his own tipcart and collected garbage for a living. Shea attended public elementary school, then dropped out after the sixth grade to work for his father.

Little is known about Shea's life between 1884 and 1894. But at the age of 22, Shea married 19-year-old Mary "Minnie" Lyons, the daughter of Irish immigrants Patrick and Margaret (Reagan) Lyons. The Sheas married in Cambridge on May 27, 1895. The couple had two daughters, Margaret and Genevieve, with three sons dead in infancy.

== Early Teamsters career ==
The American Federation of Labor (AFL) had helped form local unions of teamsters since 1887. In November 1898, the AFL organized the Team Drivers' International Union (TDIU). In 1900, Shea helped organize TDIU Local 191 in Boston. He was elected the local's business agent in 1901, and president of the newly organized Boston Team Drivers' Joint Council in 1902. He was also elected a delegate to the Boston Central Labor Council and the local building trades alliance.

In 1901, a group of Teamsters in Chicago, Illinois, broke from the TDIU and formed the Teamsters National Union. The new union permitted only employees, teamster helpers, and owner-operators owning only a single team to join, unlike the TDIU (which permitted large employers to be members), and was very aggressive in advocating higher wages and shorter hours. Claiming more than 28,000 members in 47 locals, its president, Albert Young, applied for membership in the AFL. The AFL asked the TDIU to merge with Young's union to form a new, AFL-affiliated union. The two groups did so in 1903, creating the International Brotherhood of Teamsters (IBT). Shea was elected the new union's first president.

Shea's election as the first Teamster president was a tumultuous one. Shea effectively controlled the convention because the Chicago locals—representing nearly half the IBT's membership—were united in their support for his candidacy. Shea was opposed by John Sheridan, president of the Ice Drivers' Union of Chicago. Sheridan and George Innes, president of the TDIU, accused Shea of embezzlement in an attempt to prevent his election. Despite surprisingly little lack of support from the Boston locals, Shea won election on August 8, 1903, by a vote of 605 to 480. Edward L. Turley of Chicago was elected secretary-treasurer and Albert Young general organizer.

In 1903, Shea moved his family to Indianapolis, Indiana, where the Teamsters had their headquarters. But daughter Margaret fell ill in Indianapolis, and Mary Shea moved the family to Charlestown, Massachusetts, while Cornelius Shea stayed in Indiana.

== Teamsters presidency: 1903 ==
Shea was confronted by a crisis within the union in late 1903, a crisis which centered on the union's membership based in Chicago. One-third of unionized Chicago citizens worked in a single industry (meatpacking). One particular union, the Teamsters were vitally important to the Chicago labor movement, as a sympathy strike by the Teamsters could paralyze the movement of goods throughout the city and bring a strike into nearly every neighborhood.

In November 1903, Teamsters employed by the Chicago City Railway went out on strike. Shea, who does not advocate sympathy strikes, attempted to stop sympathy strikes by other Teamster locals in the city but failed. However, three Teamster locals in the city—the truck, ice wagon, and coal wagon drivers, which together represented about half the Teamster membership in Chicago—refused to violate their contracts and walk off the job. The three locals went even further, and disaffiliated from the Teamsters Joint Council of Chicago. Furious, Shea called them "cowards and traitors". His outburst only angered his opponents in the union. In mid-December, Shea was confronted in his office by Teamster leader who shot at him four times and forced him to dance a jig before fleeing.

== Teamsters presidency: 1904 ==
On July 12, 1904, 18,000 members of the Amalgamated Meat Cutters working in the meatpacking industry in Chicago walked off the job to win higher wages. The contract for the packinghouse drivers belonging to the Teamsters union had expired on June 1, 1904, and the ongoing strike by the butcher workmen led the drivers to fear for their own contract talks. On July 25, 1904, the packinghouse drivers asked the international Teamsters union to sanction a strike. On July 26, Shea agreed to let them walk out the next day, declaring that the walkout was not a sympathy strike but "It is, therefore, to protect ourselves" and prevent the packers from breaking the union. The meatpackers, however, brought in several thousand African American strikebreakers. With meatpacking plants operating at about 40 percent of capacity, the strike began to falter. On August 8, Shea ordered the ice wagon and market drivers to strike in support of the butcher workmen. The hope was that, with no refrigeration and delivery slowed, the meat would spoil and the packers would be forced to come to the bargaining table. On the afternoon of August 9, riots occurred throughout the afternoon and evening in Chicago, and a number of strikers and strikebreakers were assaulted or wounded by gunfire.

As the strike collapsed, Shea rushed to Chicago from Indianapolis. He ordered the ice wagon drivers back to work on August 10, and announced that Teamster drivers would deliver any meat butchered prior to the strike. Large amounts of meat began to move through the city on August 13. On August 18, 4,000 strikers and their supporters rioted for two hours outside the Chicago stockyards, causing numerous injuries. Some local Teamster leaders tried to lead the ice and market wagon drivers back out on strike, but Shea denounced them and successfully appealed to the drivers to stay on the job. To keep union members in line, however, Shea reiterated his pledge that no meat butchered after the start of the strike would be hauled. Despite this, the strike collapsed on September 6, 1904, when the Amalgamated Meat Cutters went back to work without a contract.

In the midst of the strife in Chicago, Cornelius Shea was re-elected by acclamation on August 8, 1904, at the Teamsters convention in Cincinnati, Ohio. Under his leadership, the union had expanded to 821 locals in 300 cities, and the union's membership stood near 50,000 members (making it one of the largest unions in the United States).

== Teamsters presidency: 1905 ==
=== Chicago Teamsters' strike ===
On December 15, 1904, 19 clothing cutters at Montgomery Ward went on strike to protest the company's use of nonunion subcontractors. Montgomery Ward vice president Robert J. Thorne locked the remaining workers out. Sympathy strikes by tailors' and other unions quickly broke out. By April, 5,000 workers were on the picket line in front of the 26 local companies represented by the National Tailors' Association (an employer group). The Teamsters engaged in a sympathy strike on April 6, 1905, adding another 10,000 members to the picket lines.

Anti-union group Employers' Association of Chicago (EA) attempted to sabotage the Teamsters' strike. The EA collected $250,000 (about $6.2 million in 2007 dollars) from its members to hire strikebreakers. The EA also raised $1 million (about $25 million in 2007 dollars) to establish the Employers' Teaming Association—a new company which, within a matter of weeks, bought out a large number of team owners and imported hundreds of African American strikebreakers from St. Louis to work as teamsters. Mark Morton, president of Morton Salt and an EA member, convinced the railroads to pressure the remaining team owners to lock out their Teamster members as well.

On April 16, anonymous charges of graft against Shea and other strike leaders were filed with office of Mayor Edward Fitzsimmons Dunne (who had been inaugurated only days earlier). Shea and the executive board of the Chicago Federation of Labor dismissed the allegations out of hand.

Another 25,000 Teamsters walked off the job in a sympathy strike on April 25, 1905, paralyzing grocery stores, warehouses, railway shippers, department stores and coal companies. The EA and its members then sued nearly every union involved in the strike. Local and state courts issued numerous injunctions against the unions, ordering them to stop picketing and return to work.

On April 29, 12 prominent labor leaders in Chicago—including Shea; Charles Dold, president of the Chicago Federation of Labor; and 10 local Teamster presidents—were indicted by a grand jury on six counts of conspiracy to restrain trade, commit violence, and prevent citizens from obtaining work. Shea refused to appear in court to provide pre-trial testimony regarding the April 29 indictment. When threatened with jail for contempt of court, he finally appeared but answered all questions with variations of "I don't know."

On May 10, Dold, Shea and other strike leaders met with President Theodore Roosevelt as he passed through Chicago. Roosevelt refused to mediate an end to the strike, denounced the use of strike violence, and warned the labor leaders to settle the dispute quickly before federal military intervention was needed.

As the strike continued, Shea's handling of the dispute came under fire from the executive board of the international Teamsters union. On May 27, the board removed Shea from day-to-day control of the strike and transferred that authority to itself.

The strike ended not through the efforts of the EA or the unions, but due to allegations of graft made by team owner John C. Driscoll. At the time, Driscoll was secretary of the Team Owners' Association, the employer group which had locked out the Teamsters after April 6. On June 2, a grand jury heard Driscoll testify that he had taken at least $10,000 in bribes from Thorne and other executives to force the unions out on strike. Driscoll also alleged that the Teamsters and other unions had demanded and received bribes to end the strike, and that Driscoll had skimmed portions of these bribes into his own pocket. $50,000 in cancelled checks were produced in court to support his claims. Driscoll's accusations unleashed a flood of allegations and counter-allegations by other witnesses. Shea and Albert Young accused several employers of offering bribes to strike their business competitors, and submitted evidence of previous bribes which the Teamster leaders had accepted. Thorne and the other employers countered that Shea and other union leaders had asked for bribes ranging from $20,000 to $50,000 to call off the current strike. On June 3, the grand jury returned bribery and conspiracy indictments against Shea and 19 other union leaders, but none against the employers.

The evening of June 3, Thorne swore out arrest warrants for Shea on charges of criminal libel for making in-court accusations of bribery. The arrest infuriated Shea. Late that evening, having made bail, he convened an emergency meeting of the Teamster executive board. Ensuring that primarily his supporters attended the meeting, Shea pushed through several resolutions calling for an end to the strike's peace talks, reaffirming support for the strike, and praising Shea's handling of the strike. Although negotiations for a tailors' contract were nearly complete, Shea withdrew his negotiators and repudiated the tentative agreements which had been reached. Shea was arrested again on June 5, this time for failing to pay bond regarding the June 3 conspiracy indictment.

After these developments, talks to end the strike began. Agreement was reached on a wide range of issues between May 24 and June 2. But despite threats by Shea to call 8,000 truck drivers out on strike, clothing stores unaffiliated with the EA refused to break ranks and settle with the Teamsters and the strike continued.

On June 12, Chicago newspapers revealed that Shea was living in a local brothel called the Kentucky Home, and kept a 19-year-old waitress (Alice P. Walsh) as a mistress. The allegations of womanizing and partying during the strike further eroded public support for the picketing workers. Two days later, the Teamsters' Chicago Joint Council called the strike a "dead issue" and "unimportant." The following day, Shea was excoriated by the international union's executive board for his behavior, and the local strike committee was disbanded as the union sought a way to end the strike and save face at the same time.

On July 1, Shea was indicted a third time on charges of conspiracy.

Although the bribery accusations undercut both sides, public support for the unions suffered most. While nearly every union continued to support the strike publicly, nearly all of them sent their members back to work by the end of June. The Teamsters officially continued to support the strike, but various divisions of the union also went back to work in June and July. By August 1, 1905, the strike was over and the employers ended the lockout. Nearly half the Teamsters in Chicago never regained their jobs.

=== Re-election battle ===
Opposition to Shea's re-election as president of the Teamsters appeared in early June 1905. Albert Young announced that Shea had mismanaged the Chicago sympathy strike and that he would run for president at the union's convention in Philadelphia, Pennsylvania, in August. Shea was supported by about half the 200 delegates from locals outside Chicago, with the remaining delegates split among two other reform candidates. Although the 325-member convention was dominated by the 125-member Chicago delegation, the Chicagoans appeared split between Young and Shea.

Shea won re-election on August 12, 1905, by a vote of 129 to 121. Young never emerged as a viable candidate. Instead, Daniel Furman of Chicago ran against Shea, supported by Young and Secretary-Treasurer Edward Turley. But Furman was a stalking horse, and—in exchange for a large bribe—secretly supported Shea. Furman deserted the anti-Shea forces in the balloting, voting publicly for Shea. Furman's defection in the very election for which he was a candidate threw the election to Shea. Turley was defeated for re-election as well, and members of Shea's slate won every office on the international union executive board.

An outraged Albert Young threatened to lead a majority of the Teamsters in Chicago, New York City and San Francisco out of the union to form a rival organization.

== Teamsters presidency: 1906 ==
=== Re-election battle ===
Shea spent the fall of 1905 and the winter of 1906 solidifying his control over the Teamsters. Shea accused a number of local presidents—all of whom had opposed him in the August 1905 election—with financial malfeasance. He trusted their locals and placed his own supporters in charge of these unions.

In July 1906, Albert Young, still the Teamsters' general organizer, announced he would run against Shea at the union's convention in August.

The 1906 Teamster international convention opened in Chicago on August 6, 1906. Fistfights erupted among the delegates, and the Chicago police were called to quell what nearly turned into a riot. Initially, Young appeared to have enough delegates to unseat Shea. But Shea made a dramatic speech on the convention floor in which he said his defeat would ensure his conviction in his upcoming conspiracy trials and enable the union's foes to destroy the Teamsters. Shea also pledged that, if acquitted, he would resign the presidency in favor of a unity candidate. In a series of test votes over procedural and policy issues, it became apparent that Shea's speech had turned the tide and he now held a better than two-to-one edge in votes. After the test votes, 50 delegates followed Young out of the convention hall on August 9 to form their own organization, the United Teamsters of America (UTA). Samuel Gompers was called to Chicago to help prevent the breach, but his mediation efforts ultimately proved unsuccessful. Shea was re-elected president of the International Brotherhood of Teamsters by a vote of 157 to 14.

Over the next month, the Shea and Young factions battled for control of various Teamster locals. In late August, Shea ordered all Teamster locals to hold meetings to vote on whether they wished to remain with the IBT or go with the secessionist UTA. Shea sent representatives to each local union meeting to lobby for continued affiliation. This effort was largely successful, holding disaffiliations to only about half the 30 locals in Chicago and a handful of others scattered across the nation.

=== Trial ===
Voir dire for Shea's first trial stemming from the 1905 Chicago strike began on September 13, 1906. Selection of the jury took 66 days, and 3,920 potential jurors were interviewed before a jury could be seated.

After two weeks of legal maneuvers, the trial began on November 30 with a major bombshell: Albert Young had pleaded guilty to conspiracy and turned state's evidence against Cornelius Shea. The following day, Young alleged that he, Shea and three others had each received a $300 bribe from the tailors' union in order to call the April 6 sympathy strike against Montgomery Ward. Over the next few days, Young and other witnesses also testified that Shea had ordered the beating of non-union drivers and strikebreakers and personally told picketers to throw acid at horses and non-union team drivers.

Shea's defense focused on his efforts to end the strike. His attorneys argued that if Shea had taken bribes to lead the Teamsters out on strike, he would not have sought to end the strike in good faith. But, they argued, Shea had very strenuously sought an end to the labor dispute several times. Shea's lawyers specifically pointed to the May 10 meeting with President Roosevelt, and Shea himself wrote to the president asking Roosevelt to write a letter to the court documenting Shea's good faith effort to end the strike. Shea's defense team also subpoenaed Mayor Dunne, seeking to have him testify to the many "peace conferences" at which Shea had tried to end the strike. Roosevelt acceded to Shea's request, and sent a transcript of the meeting to the court. The plan to have Mayor Dunne testify, however, was ruled out of order by the court. Shea's defense team also called the head of the tailors' union, who strenuously denied that he had ever bribed or attempted to bribe Shea.

On January 19, 1907, the jury in Shea's first conspiracy trial announced it was hopelessly deadlocked. The judge ruled that the trial had ended in a hung jury.

== Teamsters presidency: 1907 ==
Cornelius Shea's second conspiracy trial began on February 1, 1907. In comparison to the 119-day first trial, the second trial ended in just 19 days. Shea's defense team was so confident of acquittal that they waived final arguments before the jury. The defense team's confidence was not misplaced: The jury took just two hours to return a verdict of "not guilty." A disheartened state's attorney subsequently announced that all additional charges against Shea and his co-conspirators would be dropped.

Despite Shea's legal successes, he lost control of the Teamsters union. Shea initially attempted to assert his power by replacing and blacklisting his opponents within the union as he had done before. But at a closed-door meeting of the union's executive board, the board expressed its anger that Shea had not resigned as promised after the conclusion of his two trials. Subsequently, nearly all of Shea's backers withdrew their support for his presidency.

At the Teamsters' international convention in Boston in August 1907, Shea lost re-election to Daniel J. Tobin, president of Local 25 in Boston and president of the Teamsters' Joint District Council. The election turned on the question of whether the remaining Chicago locals and all the New York City locals would bolt the union if Shea were re-elected. By a vote of 94 to 104, the delegates believed they would, and so elected Tobin the new president of the union. Shea's supporters won only three of the seven slots on the executive board, as well as the offices of secretary-treasurer and auditor. Tobin candidates won seven of the eight other offices (which included two of the three union trustees and all AFL delegate positions). Shea announced his full support for Tobin's presidency, and left office on October 1, 1907.

== Post-Teamsters life ==
=== Personal problems and prison ===
Personal issues dominated Cornelius Shea's life in 1908 and 1909.

In June 1908, Chicago police sought to arrest Shea on charges of mail fraud, but could not locate him. In July, Shea was arrested in Boston and tried for abandoning his wife and two young children. He was convicted on July 23, and sentenced to six months in prison. Although Shea appeared to have income, his wife testified that she had already sold all her belongings and that her children were near starvation.

After his release from prison, Shea abandoned his family. In January 1909, he moved to New York City after being hired by a Teamsters local there to help run a strike. He was quickly elected the local's secretary-treasurer. Shea was arrested on April 29, 1909, in connection with a fistfight which occurred during the strike, but was released. Shea's Chicago mistress, Alice Walsh, followed him to New York and moved into his apartment. On May 21, a drunken Shea brutally slashed and stabbed Walsh 27 times in their apartment. Shea was arrested and convicted of attempted murder, and sentenced on July 23 to 5 to 25 years in Sing Sing. Shea was released from prison in September 1914 and given two years' probation.

=== Labor racketeering ===
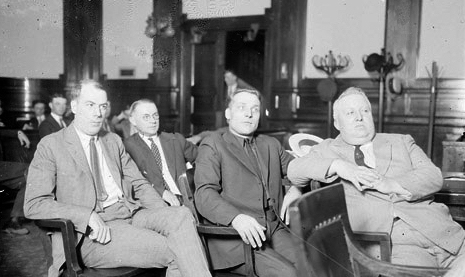
Timothy D. Murphy, Fred Mader, John Miller, and Cornelius Shea, during their murder trial in Chicago, Illinois, in 1922. DN-0003451, Chicago Daily News negatives collection, Chicago Historical Society.

The final 15 years of Cornelius Shea's life were spent in Chicago, where he associated with gangsters, rose in the ranks of at least one gang, and engaged in labor racketeering.

In the summer of 1916, in violation of his parole, Shea left New York State and moved to Chicago. He joined Timothy D. "Big Tim" Murphy's Irish American gang, and was allegedly involved in a number of crimes. His main jobs were labor racketeering and extortion bombing, and he was well known as bomb terrorist. His cover was working as a bartender at the Halsted Street Hotel. His co-employee was William Rooney, an ex-"slugger" for the Teamsters. Rooney was tried in April 1917 for jury tampering, and Shea defended Rooney in court in regard to the charge (which was dismissed). In May 1917, the saloon's license was revoked when Chicago officials learned that Shea actually managed the saloon and may have invested in it in violation of the terms of his parole. On May 29, Shea was arrested for complicity in a payroll robbery after the alleged thieves used his saloon as a hideout. Shea was released and not charged. In June 1919, Chicago police suspected Shea of involvement in a bank robbery. While searching for Shea's automobile, the vehicle was blown up on June 4. Police did not arrest or indict Shea in connection with either event. Shea later became an officer in an automobile dealership. The dealership entered involuntary bankruptcy in 1920, and investors in the company accused Shea of fraud. Once again, no arrest or conviction was made. In November 1922, Chicago police alleged that Shea led an auto theft ring, but no arrest was made.

In 1917, Shea re-entered the labor relations field. "Big Tim" Murphy, who controlled a number of large Chicago-area unions and was the president of the Gas Workers' Union, made Shea his chief assistant in his extortion rackets. Shea allegedly conducted a wide range of labor racketeering and labor extortion rackets on Murphy's behalf. Shea organized the "Chicago Saloon Keepers' Local 1," a union which existed only on paper, and acted as the union's business agent as a means of seeking bribes from saloonkeepers. On June 10, 1918, Shea was arrested for allegedly demanding bribes from scrap and junk dealers in exchange for not calling strikes against their businesses. He was tried in February 1919, but acquitted. In 1921, Shea became a staff representative with a Chicago junk dealers' union and stationary engineers' union. During a stationary engineers' strike which began in November 1920, a number of laundries and other businesses were bombed. Shea was accused of providing the explosives and setting some bombs himself, but no charges were ever brought.

Some time between 1917 and 1921, Shea became the secretary-treasurer and business agent for the Theatrical Janitors' Union. The union had been formed by mobster and labor racketeer Louis "Three Gun" Alterie. Shea allegedly used his union office to extort money from theater owners in exchange for refusing to call strikes against their businesses. As "Big Tim" Murphy moved to take over the Chicago Building and Trades Alliance, a key coalition of building trade unions in the city, Shea became Murphy's chief criminal deputy on union matters.

On May 6, 1922, Shea, Murphy, Jerry Horan, and five other labor leaders were arrested and charged with the murder of a Chicago police officer. On May 24, the state asked for nolle prosequi and the court agreed to withdraw the indictments. A new indictment was returned against Shea and the others in August (Shea was re-indicted on August 2, 1922), but this second indictment was withdrawn by the state as well.

Murphy was convicted and imprisoned shortly thereafter for a daylight armed robbery of a mail train. Shea, however, continued his career as an extortionist and bomber. He joined Sangerman's Bombers, a group of bomb terrorists which had emerged from the remnants of the James Sweeney gang, and did work for Al Capone's Chicago Outfit. But Shea worked both sides of the organized crime fence, however. In 1924, he appeared at a testimonial dinner for North Side Gang leader Dean O'Banion, Capone's primary rival.

O'Banion's murder by members of the Chicago Outfit in November 1924 sparked a major gang war in the city. Public opinion finally turned against the gangs, and the number of bombings in Chicago declined dramatically as extortionists sought more subtle means of intimidating victims. Alterie left Chicago for Colorado (and safety), leaving Shea in charge of the Theatrical Janitors' Union. Unwilling to take sides in the gang war, Shea continued to work as secretary-treasurer and business agent for the union and engaged in low-level extortion for the next five years.

== Death ==
Cornelius Shea died on January 12, 1929, at Norwegian-American Hospital in Chicago from complications following an operation to remove gallstones.

== Notes ==
Preceded by Founding president	President of Teamsters Union (IBT); 1903–1907	Succeeded by Daniel J. Tobin
