= George Mock =

George Earl Mock (September 24, 1907 – November 25, 2001) was labor leader and official of the Teamsters. He was interim president of the Teamsters from May 7 to May 15, 1981, after the death of president Frank Fitzsimmons.

Mock was born in Los Angeles, California, to Hanna Moe, a Scandinavian woman. Later in life he would be known as 'The Swede' because of his 6 ft 3 in (191 cm) stature and fair appearance. His step-father worked as a teamster along the area's canals. As a boy Mock drove canal mule teams for his father and later worked briefly at the Vernon Kilns. In 1934, Mock joined Teamsters Local 208. He was elected the local's secretary-treasurer in 1940. During his tenure as a local leader, he helped organize workers at Dole Food Company, Del Monte Foods, and Sears, Roebuck and Company—expanding the membership from 240 to 8,000 members by 1945.

Mock was appointed the first director of the Teamsters' Western Warehouse and Produce Council in 1945. In 1948, he was appointed the first director of the Teamsters' National Warehouse Conference.

In 1957, Mock was elected a vice president of the international union. He rose through the vice presidential ranks until elected First Vice President in 1979.

In 1967 and 1970, with Lou Goldblatt, Mock negotiated the first joint contract with the ILWU.

When Teamsters president Frank Fitzsimmons died on May 7, 1981, Mock assumed the presidency. But his advanced age militated against his election as president at the upcoming membership convention. He voluntarily stepped down as interim president on May 15, just eight days later, in favor of interim president Roy Lee Williams.

He retired from the union in 1984.

Mock and his wife, Rose Catherine (née Aiello) who preceded him in death, had one son. Mock died in Carmichael, California, of natural causes (old age).

Preceded by Frank Fitzsimmons	President of Teamsters Union (IBT); May 7–15, 1981; Interim	Succeeded by Roy Lee Williams
