= John F. English =

American labor union official

John Francis English (April 14, 1889 – February 3, 1969) was an American labor union official. A member of the International Brotherhood of Teamsters (IBT), he was appointed as its Secretary-Treasurer by union president Daniel J. Tobin in 1946, and was re-elected to this post at every subsequent Teamsters convention until his death in February 1969 at the age of 80. The organisation itself described English as the "greatest Secretary-Treasurer" it had encountered.

== Life and career ==
In 1957, English was elected as a vice-president of the AFL-CIO. However, he lost the seat shortly after, when the Teamsters were expelled from the federation.

English was noted for being a Teamsters official who maintained a reputation for integrity, and who had openly opposed union president Dave Beck but he also vocally defended Beck's successor, Jimmy Hoffa, and other Teamsters officials who faced accusations of corruption. Robert F. Kennedy, in his 1960 book about union corruption, The Enemy Within, noted that "no question has ever been raised about John English's integrity" but also described his disappointment after English praised Hoffa at the 1957 Teamsters convention.

Trade union offices
Preceded by John M. Gillespie	Secretary-Treasurer of the International Brotherhood of Teamsters; 1946–1969	Succeeded by Thomas Flynn
