= Roy Lee Williams =

American labor leader (1915–1989)

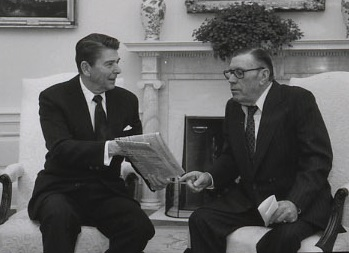
- with Ronald Reagan in 1982
- Born: March 22, 1915; Ottumwa, Iowa, U.S.
- Died: April 28, 1989 (aged 74); Leeton, Missouri, U.S.
- Occupation: Union leader
- Children: Two daughters

Roy Lee Williams (March 22, 1915 – April 28, 1989) was an American labor leader who was president of the Teamsters from May 15, 1981, to April 14, 1983.

== Early life and career ==
Born in Ottumwa, Iowa, Williams was one of 12 children in a very poor family. He grew up in the Ozark Mountains in southwestern Missouri. He got work as a truck driver in 1935.

Williams served in the United States Army in World War II and personally took 41 German soldiers prisoner, earning him the Silver Star.

== Teamsters ==
After the war, Williams returned to trucking. He was elected business agent of the union's Wichita, Kansas, local in 1948. He later was elected president of Joint Council 56 and president of Teamsters Local 41 in Kansas City, Missouri. He married and had two daughters.

In 1955, Williams was elected a trustee of the Central States, Southeast and Southwest Areas Pension Fund, one of the union's largest and most important pension funds. He later testified in federal court that leaders of organized crime paid him $1,500 a month in order to funnel $87.75 million in loans from the pension fund to construction projects run by the mob. During this period, Williams formed a close working relationship with Teamsters president Jimmy Hoffa.

Williams quickly rose to power in the post-Hoffa Teamsters by associating himself with new president Frank Fitzsimmons. In 1967, Williams was appointed spokesman for the union's national surface transportation negotiating committee by Fitzsimmons. In 1971, Williams elected appointed a vice president of the international union. In 1976, Fitzsimmons appointed Williams to be director of the Central Conference of Teamsters, a regional council which controlled union locals in 14 Midwestern states.

In 1977, Williams was forced to resign from the Central States Pension Fund after the United States Department of Labor sued Williams and four others for violating their fiduciary duty.

== Teamsters presidency ==
Fitzsimmons died on May 6, 1981. First vice president George Mock was named interim president. But Mock's age militated against his assuming the presidency at the upcoming membership convention. So on May 15, Mock stepped down and Williams was named interim president by the Teamsters executive board.

Williams's suspected involvement with organized crime, particularly Kansas City Crime Boss Nicholas Civella, made him an immediate target for federal prosecution. On May 11, 1981, testimony before a subcommittee of the United States Senate indicated that Williams was heavily involved with the Mafia. Williams was indicted on May 22.

On June 6, 1981, two weeks after his indictment, Teamsters members elected Williams president, to serve out Fitzsimmons's unexpired five-year term.

During his short tenure as president, Williams was forced to reopen the national trucking agreement in September 1981 and accept a two-year wage freeze (which the union ratified in March 1982).

== Trial and conviction ==
After a two-month trial during which extensive wiretapping evidence was heard, Williams and four others were convicted on December 15, 1982, for conspiring to bribe Nevada Senator Howard Cannon to defeat a trucking industry deregulation bill, the Motor Carrier Regulatory Reform and Modernization Act of 1980.

Williams attempted to remain president of the Teamsters, however. He was sentenced to 55 years in prison on March 31, 1983. He offered to testify in various trials of organized crime figures, which federal prosecutors accepted. Williams remained free on bail while he was deposed. But Congress, hearing more and more testimony about the degree of criminal infiltration of the Teamsters, pressed him to step down. Williams eventually resigned on April 14, 1983, and Teamsters international vice president Jackie Presser assumed the presidency. A large collection of documents that were produced during Williams's tenure as Teamsters president are now preserved in the Special Collections Research Center of The George Washington University, located in the Estelle and Melvin Gelman Library.

His continuing testimony delayed his prison term. Roy Williams finally entered a federal medical prison on August 20, 1985. He continued to testify in a large number of cases.

It would later be reported that Williams's successor as Teamsters president, Jackie Presser, had been an FBI informant for years, and was a critical source of the information used in Williams's conviction.

== Parole and death ==
In August 1988, Williams was granted parole due to ill health and for having turned state's evidence in federal prosecutions in a number of other criminal cases. He was released from the United States Medical Center for Federal Prisoners in Springfield, Missouri, in September 1988. His parole was conditioned on his continuing cooperation with federal authorities.

However, Williams only testified a few more times in the seven months of life left to him. He died on April 28, 1989, at his farm in Leeton, Missouri, from cardiac disease and emphysema.

== See also ==
| Preceded by George Mock (interim) | President of Teamsters Union (IBT); May 15, 1981 – April 14, 1983 | Succeeded by Jackie Presser |
