= Frank Fitzsimmons =

American labor leader (1908–1981)

- Fitzsimmons in 1977

General President of the International Brotherhood of Teamsters
- In office February 28, 1967 – May 6, 1981 (Note: Acting: February 28, 1967 – July 9, 1971)
- Preceded by: Jimmy Hoffa
- Succeeded by: George Mock

Personal details
- Born: Frank Edward Fitzsimmons; April 7, 1908 Jeannette, Pennsylvania, U.S.
- Died: May 6, 1981 (aged 73) San Diego, California, U.S.
- Spouses: Cleo Delancy Hartman (m. 1928; died 1952) Mary Patricia (m. 1952)
- Children: 2 (first marriage); 2 (second marriage)
- Parent(s): Frank and Ida May Fitzsimmons
- Occupation: Union leader

Frank Edward Fitzsimmons (April 7, 1908 – May 6, 1981) was an American labor leader. He was acting president of the International Brotherhood of Teamsters from 1967 to 1971, and president from 1971 to 1981.

== Early life ==
Frank Fitzsimmons was born on April 7, 1908, in Jeannette, Pennsylvania, to Irish-American parents, Frank and Ida May Fitzsimmons. His father was a brewer who moved the family to Detroit, Michigan, in 1924 when Frank was 16. His father died of a heart attack when Fitzsimmons was 17 years old, and Frank dropped out of high school to support his family by working in an automobile hardware store. In 1932, he got a job as a bus driver in Detroit, Michigan, and New York City before becoming a truck driver in Detroit in 1935. He joined Teamsters Local 299, and became friendly with the local union's president, Jimmy Hoffa.

Fitzsimmons was elected Local 299 business manager in 1936, Local 299 vice president in 1940, and (at Hoffa's insistence) an international union vice president of the Teamsters in 1961. He was appointed secretary-treasurer of the 80,000-member Michigan Conference of Teamsters in 1949, and vice president of Teamsters Joint Council 43 in Detroit in 1959. During this time, Fitzsimmons became known as "a figure of ridicule" in the Teamsters; he was inarticulate, chubby, passive and easily embarrassed, and Hoffa and others frequently had him make coffee or hold chairs and rarely gave him any authority or duties. Nonetheless, Fitzsimmons was considered an adept manager and a very skilled contract negotiator. Despite Hoffa's many legal problems and the routine emasculation, Fitzsimmons remained the Teamsters president's staunchest supporter.

== Teamsters presidency ==
=== Acting president ===
When Harold J. Gibbons resigned as Hoffa's executive assistant in December 1963 after a failed coup against the indicted Teamsters president, Hoffa appointed Fitzsimmons to the office. In 1964, Hoffa was sentenced to an aggregate 13 years in prison for jury tampering, conspiracy, and mail and wire fraud. Fitzsimmons was initially not considered to be popular enough to succeed Hoffa, but Fitzsimmons was elected General Vice President of the Teamsters in July 1966, which to many Teamsters leaders signalled Hoffa's intention to make Fitzsimmons his heir-apparent if Hoffa was imprisoned. On February 28, 1967, the Teamsters executive board passed a resolution appointing Fitzsimmons "acting president" if Hoffa was no longer able to carry out his duties.

After failed appeals, Hoffa entered prison in March 1967, and attempted to run the union from jail through Fitzsimmons. Fitzsimmons, however, was to be nothing more than a glorified gofer:

But there is no certainty that Hoffa intends to let Fitzsimmons run anything. Indeed, few other Teamster big wigs even pretend that the chunky, amiable Hoffa right bower has the capacity to hold the union together for long. "He's just a peanut butter sandwich; he'll melt in no time," is the unflattering comment of one union insider.

Fitzsimmons and others even denied that they were doing work on Hoffa's orders. National trucking industry talks, which were interrupted when Hoffa went to jail, resumed with Fitzsimmons at the table. Although the pact expired and the union struck for three days, Fitzsimmons was able to negotiate a new agreement, with a federal mediator's help, that some believed was richer than any Hoffa could have obtained. He negotiated a second contract three years later that provided a 27-percent wage increase over three years.

Fitzsimmons rapidly solidified his own hold on the Teamsters presidency throughout 1967. He had permitted the International vice presidents greater latitude in their own affairs and delegated authority to them, winning their allegiance. He defeated an executive-board attempt to oust him in July and followed it up by demoting Hoffa aides and promoting his own supporters (including Weldon Mathis) to high positions in the union. By August, he had openly declared he would run for the presidency of the union. He further increased his popularity by negotiating in October 1967 a national master contract in the trucking industry that brought 40,000 Northeastern truckers into the contract for the first time and by negotiating a new contract that ended a five-month steel haulers' strike.

Fitzsimmons also began taking the union in new directions. In July 1968 he and Walter Reuther, the president of the United Auto Workers formed a new national trade union center, the Alliance for Labor Action, to organize unorganized workers and to pursue left-wing political and social projects. Fitzsimmons and Reuther offered the AFL-CIO a no-raid pact as a first step toward building a working relationship between the competing trade union centers, but the offer was rejected. The Alliance's initial program was ambitious, but Reuther's death in a plane crash on May 9, 1970, near Black Lake, Michigan, dealt a serious blow to the Alliance. The group collapsed in January 1972 after the Auto Workers were unable to continue to fund its operations.

=== First presidency ===
On June 19, 1971, Hoffa resigned as Teamsters president and Fitzsimmons was elected international president on his own right on July 9, 1971. Fitzsimmons announced Hoffa's resignation at the Playboy Plaza Hotel in Miami, where he was joined by President Richard Nixon. This marked the first time a Teamsters president had met a US president since Franklin Delano Roosevelt. Nixon stated "My door is always open to President Fitzsimmons and that is the way it should be". By the year's end, Fitzsimmons had purged the union's top offices of several Hoffa supporters. In 1973, he resigned his position as vice president of Local 299 and his son, Richard, was appointed his successor. On July 10, 1975, a Lincoln Continental used by Richard Fitzsimmons was destroyed by a bomb outside a bar in which he was having a drink.

Fitzsimmons engaged in a notorious jurisdictional and organizing dispute with the United Farm Workers (UFW) from 1972 to 1977, raiding the smaller union and establishing a new national farm workers' union to compete with it. The series of raids and counter-raids, repudiated contracts, and public-relations attacks began in December 1972 when Fitzsimmons ordered a 1967 no-raid and organizing non-compete agreement with the UFW to be dissolved and Teamsters contract negotiators to reopen contracts. The UFW sued, the AFL-CIO condemned the action, and many employers negotiated contracts with the Teamsters, rather than with the UFW. Although an agreement giving UFW jurisdiction over field workers and the Teamsters jurisdiction over packing and warehouse workers was reached on September 27, 1973, Fitzsimmons reneged on the agreement within a month and moved ahead with forming a farm workers regional union in California. The organizing battles even became violent at times. By 1975, the UFW had won 24 elections and the Teamsters 14, and UFW membership had plummeted to just 6,000 from nearly 70,000 while the Teamsters farmworker division counted 55,000 workers. The Teamsters subsequently signed sweetheart deals with more than 375 California growers. Financially exhausted, the UFW signed an agreement with Fitzsimmons in March 1977 in which the UFW agreed to seek to organize only workers covered by the California Agricultural Labor Relations Act, and the Teamsters would have jurisdiction over all other agricultural workers.

In October 1973, Fitzsimmons ended a longrunning jurisdictional dispute with the United Brewery Workers, and the Brewery Workers merged with the Teamsters.

By 1973, Hoffa was planning to seize the presidency of the Teamsters again. Hoffa had been released from prison on December 23, 1971, when U.S. President Richard Nixon commuted his sentence to time served. According to the US. Department of Justice and White House officials, Hoffa's release was granted on the condition that he not participate directly or indirectly in union activities until 1980. However, Hoffa contended that he had never agreed to any such condition and unsuccessfully sued to have the restriction overturned. However, Fitzsimmons supported the government's position, and Charles Colson, special counsel to Nixon who helped negotiate Hoffa's release, backed Fitzsimmon's interpretation of the release agreement.

Hoffa intended to publish a book accusing Fitzsimmons of "selling out to mobsters" and giving large low- and no-interest loans from Teamsters pension funds to mob-related businesses. However, Hoffa disappeared on July 30, 1975, removing the last significant opposition to Fitzsimmons's re-election. Fitzsimmons was for a time a suspect in the disappearance. Fitzsimmons continued to solidify his hold on the Teamsters throughout 1975 and 1976.

During his first term Richard Nixon appointed Fitzsimmons to the Pay Board as he was implementing his economic reform program. Fitzsimmons made a personal contribution of $4000 in 1972 when Nixon was running for reelection. In October 1975 Fitsimmons was spotted golfing with Nixon in a tournament at Carlsbad, California. Nixon had recently resigned from the presidency and gifted Fitzsimmons a box of signed golf balls. Fitzsimmons oversaw national trucking negotiations again in 1976, which led to major wage gains. Once again, the contract expired and the Teamsters engaged in a national trucking strike. However, the strike ended after just three days, and union members ratified a contract that included a cost of living adjustment and a 30 percent rise in wages over three years.

=== Second presidency ===
Fitzsimmons was re-elected General President of the Teamsters in Las Vegas, Nevada, on June 16, 1976. An insurgent reform group, which later adopted the name Teamsters for a Democratic Union, issued a massive report accusing Fitzsimmons and other Teamsters of corruption and suppressing democracy in the union and picketed the June Teamsters convention. Fitzsimmons attacked the dissidents for trying to "destroy the union." He famously raged from the podium:

To those who say it's time to reform this organization, that it's time that the officers quit selling out the membership, I say to them, go to hell.

Delegates to the convention were not persuaded by the attacks on the union leadership and voted Fitzsimmons a 17 percent pay raise, which brought his salary to $516,250 a year ($2.9 million today), and they re-elected him to a second full term.

In the late fall of 1976, Fitzsimmons oversaw a ten-week strike at United Parcel Service. The strike, which affected 15 Eastern States and included 18,000 warehouse workers and drivers, ended after the union reached an agreement to give workers a 33 percent wage increase over three years and to restrict the employer's ability to replace full-time workers with part-time employees.

Fitzsimmons was investigated in 1976 for failing to perform his fiduciary duties as a trustee on the Teamsters' Central States Pension Fund and was forced to resign from the board of trustees in 1977. The U.S. Departments of Labor and Department of Justice first began to investigate the fund in January 1976. He was subpoenaed by both the U.S. Senate's Committee on Labor and Public Welfare and by the Labor Department, and he testified in public and private regarding loans the pension fund made to certain mob-related businesses and the fund's operations. Although the Internal Revenue Service revoked the fund's non-profit status, the penalty was suspended after Fitzsimmons agreed to remove several trustees, which he did in September 1976. Fitzsimmons and Roy Lee Williams, the director of the Central Conference of Teamsters, attempted to remain on the board, but were forced out in March 1977.

Much of his final term as president was spent fighting deregulation of the trucking industry. Deregulation had first been proposed by U.S. President Gerald Ford in 1975, and President Jimmy Carter followed through by seeking and winning passage of the Motor Carrier Act of 1980.

One of the last national negotiations that Fitzsimmons oversaw was another national trucking contract. With deregulation moving forward, the negotiations, which began in early 1979, were particularly difficult. Fitzsimmons gambled and decided to engage in a series of whipsaw strikes to pressure the employers to agree to terms, but the trucking companies responded with a lockout on April 2. The Carter administration had imposed wage and price controls, which sought to hold collective bargaining wage and benefit increases to 7.5 percent a year, but Fitzsimmons sought 10 percent a year. Four days into the labor dispute, layoffs in the automobile manufacturing industry reached 100,000, which put pressure on Fitzsimmons to lower his contract demands. The strike and the lockout were short because of those pressures, and Fitzsimmons reached on April 11, 1979, an agreement that met Carter's wage-control guideline.

== Death ==
After suffering shortness of breath at a Teamsters executive board meeting, Fitzsimmons underwent surgery in late December 1979 which removed a non-malignant tumor in his bronchial passage. In early January 1980, the Los Angeles Herald-Examiner published a story claiming that Fitzsimmons was suffering from abdominal cancer, setting off widespread rumors that Fitzsimmons was dying and that a power struggle over his succession was raging in the Teamsters. Fitzsimmons denied that he had cancer. Nonetheless, by July, Fitzsimmons admitted he had lung cancer and had undergone chemotherapy for the past seven months. However, he also declared himself cancer-free and fit to run for re-election in 1981.

Fitzsimmons's cancer returned in January 1981, leading to repeated hospitalizations, tests, weight loss, hair loss, and bouts of depression. Although he returned to work in mid-March, he was so ill by early April that many felt he might not attend the union's executive board meeting later that month. Although the deadline for announcing his re-election bid was June 1, anonymous union officials believed he was so ill that he would announce his retirement before the board meeting. Planning began to name Ray Schoessling, the union's 75-year-old secretary-treasurer, interim president. As news of Fitzsimmons's deteriorating health spread, some union leaders began to fight to take over the union.

Fitzsimmons's illness led to deterioration in labor relations in the trucking industry. Deregulation had led to fierce competition and lower rates in the industry, and several trucking companies let it be known that they would not pay the wage and benefit increases Fitzsimmons had negotiated two years before. Before entering the hospital again in late March, Fitzsimmons wrote a letter to the employers demanding that they adhere to the contract.

On May 1, 1981, Roy Lee Williams announced his candidacy for the presidency of the Teamsters. Williams made it clear, however, that if Fitzsimmons's health improved he would back the ailing general president. Williams made his announcement after rumors spread that union officials had visited Fitzsimmons in the hospital in La Jolla, California, and Fitzsimmons had agreed to retire.

Fitzsimmons died of lung cancer in San Diego, California, on May 6, 1981. He was survived by his second wife, Mary, and his four children. Four mourners attended his private funeral mass at Sacred Heart Roman Catholic Church in Palm Desert, California. Fitzsimmons remains were buried in Desert Memorial Park, in the outskirts of Palm Springs.

== In popular culture ==
- Character actor J. T. Walsh portrayed Fitzsimmons in the film Hoffa (1992).
- Gary Basaraba played Fitzsimmons in the crime film The Irishman (2019).

== Notes ==
Preceded by Jimmy Hoffa	President of Teamsters Union (IBT); 1971–1981	Succeeded by George Mock (interim)
