= 2009–10 Federal Aviation Administration Reauthorization Act dispute =

Legislation dispute

In 2009 a provision was added to the Federal Aviation Administration Reauthorization Act that would have changed the conditions under which some of FedEx Corporation's employees could unionize. FedEx referred to these provisions as the "Brown Bailout".

== Overview ==
The argument between FedEx on the one hand and UPS and the International Brotherhood of Teamsters union on the other is over which labor act FedEx's non-airline personnel should be covered under, the National Labor Relations Act (NLRA) or the Railway Labor Act (RLA):

- under the NLRA, workers are able to unionize locally, on a site-by-site basis;
- under the RLA, workers must unionize nationally, which is more challenging and tends to keep rates of unionized workers low.

As of June 2010, The NLRA covers UPS's non-airline workers, and the RLA all of its airline workers; a large number of UPS drivers, package handlers and clerks are represented by the International Brotherhood of Teamsters. Yet, all FedEx personnel, including those working on railways and other modes of ground transport, are covered under the RLA, which requires them to unionize nationally.

If the provisions were passed, FedEx's non-airline personnel would be able to unionize more easily, because they would be covered under the NLRA. According to the Memphis-based company, this change could also "expose [its] customers at any time to local work stoppages that interrupt the flow of their time-sensitive, high-value shipments”. The International Brotherhood of Teamsters has counter-attacked with its own web campaign, "FedEx drivers aren't pilots", insisting on the fact that the NLRA, not the RLA, should apply to FedEx's ground personnel.

== Controversial use of the term 'bailout' ==
The term 'Brown Bailout' refers to the provision that UPS has lobbied to have put into the $34.5 billion Federal Aviation Administration Reauthorization Act (H.R. 915) voted on by the United States House of Representatives in May 2009 and by the United States Senate in March 2010. The term was coined in FedEx's large online advertising campaign against UPS and the International Brotherhood of Teamsters; it seeks to emphasize the idea that changing FedEx's personnel statute would be equivalent to giving UPS a 'bailout'. However, independent observers have strongly criticized FedEx's wording, claiming that it was "an abuse of the term". Steve Centrillo, a marketing consultant quoted by the New York Times, described the use of the word 'bailout' as "the most questionably ethical thing on the [Brown Bailout] site". Quoted in the same article, advertising professional Scott Elser expressed his concern that the use of the word 'bailout' had "the ability to potentially harm" FedEx, arguing that what FedEx's website claimed was a bailout "clearly [was] not a bailout as most consumers and business people would define it". According to the Oxford American Dictionary, a bailout is the "act of giving financial assistance to a failing business or economy to save it from collapse".

Time Magazine listed the term 'bailout' as one of the top 10 buzzwords of 2008, insisting on its negative connotation; this is in large part due to the fact that a substantial number of Americans have a negative opinion of the Emergency Economic Stabilization Act of 2008, commonly referred to as 'a bailout of the U.S. financial system'.

== Timeline ==
- February 9, 2009: H.R. 915: FAA Reauthorization Act of 2009 introduced to House of Representatives. Sponsor: James Oberstar (D-MN 8) Cosponsor: Jerry Costello (D-IL 12)
- Referred to Following Committees:
  - House Committee on Transportation and Infrastructure and Subcommittee on Aviation
  - House Committee on Science and Technology and Subcommittee on Space and Aeronautics
  - House Committee on Homeland Security
- March 5, 2009: Committees report back to House of Representatives on the Bill
- Amendments Proposed
- May 21, 2009: Bill passes House of Representatives (277 ayes, 136 Nays, 20 present/not voting) Vote Details
- June 1, 2009: Received in the Senate and read twice. Referred to the Senate Committee on Commerce, Science and Transportation.
- March 22, 2010: Senate passes its version of the bill, without FedEx's language of the Provision
- June 30, 2010: Deadline for House and Senate to reconcile the two versions of the bill. This deadline passed without reconciliation and the bill failed to become law.

== See also ==
- Crony capitalism
