= Timothy D. Murphy =

American gangster (1885–1928)

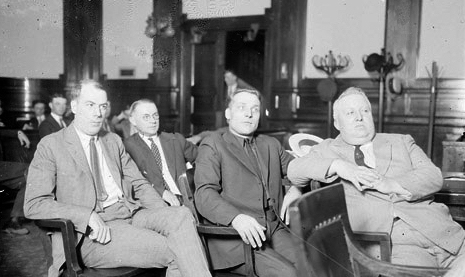
- (L:R) Murphy, Fred Mader, John Miller, and Cornelius Shea during their murder trial in 1922
- Born: 1885; Chicago, Illinois, U.S.
- Died: June 26, 1928 (aged 42–43); Chicago, Illinois, U.S.
- Occupation: Trade union leader
- Spouse: Margaret aka "Flo"
- Status: Paroled after five years
- Criminal charges: Theft, armed robbery
- Penalty: 5-7 years in federal prison

Timothy D. "Big Tim" Murphy (1885 – June 26, 1928) was a Chicago mobster and labor racketeer who controlled several major railroad, laundry and dye workers' unions during the 1910s and early 1920s.

== Life ==
Born in 1885, Murphy rose to prominence at the beginning of the 20th century in the bookmaking racket with then-partner Mont Tennes. In the 1910s, he established an Irish American gang which became one of Chicago's most powerful early organized crime organizations. Murphy's gang was one of the few respected by Al Capone and the Italian American-led Chicago Outfit.

A longtime rival of Maurice "Mossy" Enright, Murphy was suspected in his February 1920 gangland killing. Murphy was released due to lack of evidence.

Murphy was involved in a wide array of crimes and arrested and/or indicted numerous times. In February 1921, Murphy was charged with involvement in organizing the theft of $400,000 (equivalent to US$7,220,149 in 2025) from a Pullman mail train at Chicago's Union Station in August 1920. Although he was released on a $30,000 bond, Murphy was eventually convicted and sentenced by Judge Kenesaw Mountain Landis to seven years imprisonment.

On May 6, 1922, Murphy, Cornelius Shea, and six other labor leaders were arrested and charged with the murder of a Chicago police officer. On May 24, the state asked for nolle prosequi and the court agreed to withdraw the indictments. A new indictment was returned against Murphy and the others in August, but this second indictment was withdrawn by the state as well.

=== Death ===
Murphy was shot and killed as he answered the front door of his home on the night of June 26, 1928. His murder was never solved, but he may have been shot by former associates of Enright's. Others suggest he was killed by Murray "The Camel" Humphreys, a former hitman and later a lieutenant for the Chicago Outfit.

Murphy's widow, Margaret, later married mobster John "Dingbat" O'Berta, a Murphy protégé.

== See also ==
- List of homicides in Illinois § Organized crime
