= Fred Mader =

American labor leader

- Born: 1883
- Died: Unknown
- Occupations: Labor leader President, Chicago Building and Construction Trades Council
- Children: 1

Fred "Frenchy" Mader (1883 – ?) was an American labor leader and organized crime figure active in the Chicago, Illinois, labor movement in the 1910s and 1920s. He was president of the influential Chicago Building and Construction Trades Council, a coalition of construction unions, for nine months in 1922.

== Early career ==
Fred Mader was born in Chicago in 1883. When he was 14 years old, he went to work for a year at Marshall Field's running cash from the safe to the counters. He worked for a stockbroker for three years, and then spent a year working for a company which installed light fixtures in homes and apartment buildings. He moved to New York City for nine months and worked as a fixture hanger there for nine months before returning to Chicago.

Once back in Chicago, Mader joined Local 381 of the Fixture Hangers' Union, and by 1915 was the local's assistant business agent. His job was to roam construction sites, ensuring that the terms of union contracts were honored by employers.

Mader also became involved with organized crime. He was an associate of Timothy D. "Big Tim" Murphy, a mobster and labor racketeer who controlled several major railroad, laundry and dye workers' unions during the 1910s and early 1920s. In 1915, Mader was accused in court testimony of asking local business owners for protection money in exchange for not having their expensive glass windows constantly broken. Mader was sentenced to three years in prison for extortion.

After his release from prison, Mader rose quickly within Local 381, becoming its president. He was also influential in the electrical workers' union. Mader's growing importance and power within Chicago's labor movement led him to be elected president of the Chicago Building and Construction Trades Council (BCTC) on February 17, 1922. A split had emerged in the BCTC over whether to accept an arbitration award lowering wages throughout the city's construction industry, and the faction opposing the award was ousted from its leadership positions. It was later alleged that Mader won election as BCTC president due to the strong-arm tactics of "Big Tim" Murphy.

== Presidency of the BCTC ==
Just six weeks after his election, Mader was indicted for assault with a deadly weapon after allegedly attacking an electrician who had performed work assigned to the fixture hangers. Mader strongly denounced the indictment, pointing out that the alleged victim had not bothered to file charges or show up in court as a witness, and that an employer's secretary had lodged the complaint with the police.

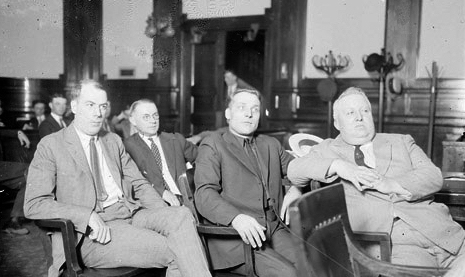
Timothy D. Murphy, Fred Mader, John Miller, and Cornelius Shea, during their murder trial in Chicago, Illinois, in 1922. DN-0003451, Chicago Daily News negatives collection, Chicago Historical Society.

On May 6, 1922, Mader, Murphy, Cornelius Shea, and six other labor leaders were arrested and charged with the murder of a Chicago police officer. On May 24, the state asked for nolle prosequi and the court agreed to withdraw the indictments.

The trial ended Mader's presidency of the BCTC. A Chicago court refused to release Mader on bail unless he pledged to step down as BCTC president. He hesitated, but agreed on May 28, 1922, and was released on a $75,000 bond (about $982,000 in 2008 inflation-adjusted dollars).

During the murder trial, Mader was also indicted on a charge of conspiring to delay the construction of the Drake Hotel. On June 8, 1922, Mader offered to plead guilty to the charge to avoid a prison term, but the plea deal was refused. During the trial, eyewitness testimony accused Mader of bribery, running a gang of "sluggers" to beat and intimidate others in the labor movement, extortion, bombings, and other crimes. Mader was convicted of this charge on June 19, 1922, and sentenced to a year in prison and a $1,000 fine. The sentence was overturned by the Supreme Court of Illinois in 1924.

The state of Illinois issued a new indictment against Mader and two others in August. The charges were the murder of a police lieutenant, extortion, assault, and bombing.

As Mader's second murder trial began, Mader attempted to withdraw his resignation as president of the BCTC (which was to have been effective at the BCTC's regular board meeting in November). Reacting to Mader's refusal, international unions belonging to the Building and Construction Trades Department of the American Federation of Labor, the BCTC's parent organization, acted to build a consensus against Mader, have him removed from office, and a new president elected. These efforts proved successful on November 13, 1922, ending Mader's presidency after just nine months. Edward Ryan, a business agent for the ornamental ironworkers' union, succeeded him.

Mader's second murder trial opened a day after his removal as BCTC president. The Illinois Attorney General's case was somewhat weak, however, and the trial court judge rebuked the state several times on the opening day for abusing the judicial process. The prosecution rested after two days. Mader's attorneys first produced a witness who not only provided an alibi for Mader at the time of the murder, but who claimed he had been taken by Chicago police to Colorado and prevented from testifying in Mader's behalf during the first trial. The following day, Mader's attorneys dropped a bombshell when an ex-police lieutenant testified that the Chicago Police Department had framed Mader and planted evidence used in the trial. The jury was unconvinced by the state's case, and Mader was declared not guilty on November 25, 1922.
