= Sean O'Brien (labor leader) =

American labor union leader

Sean M. O'Brien
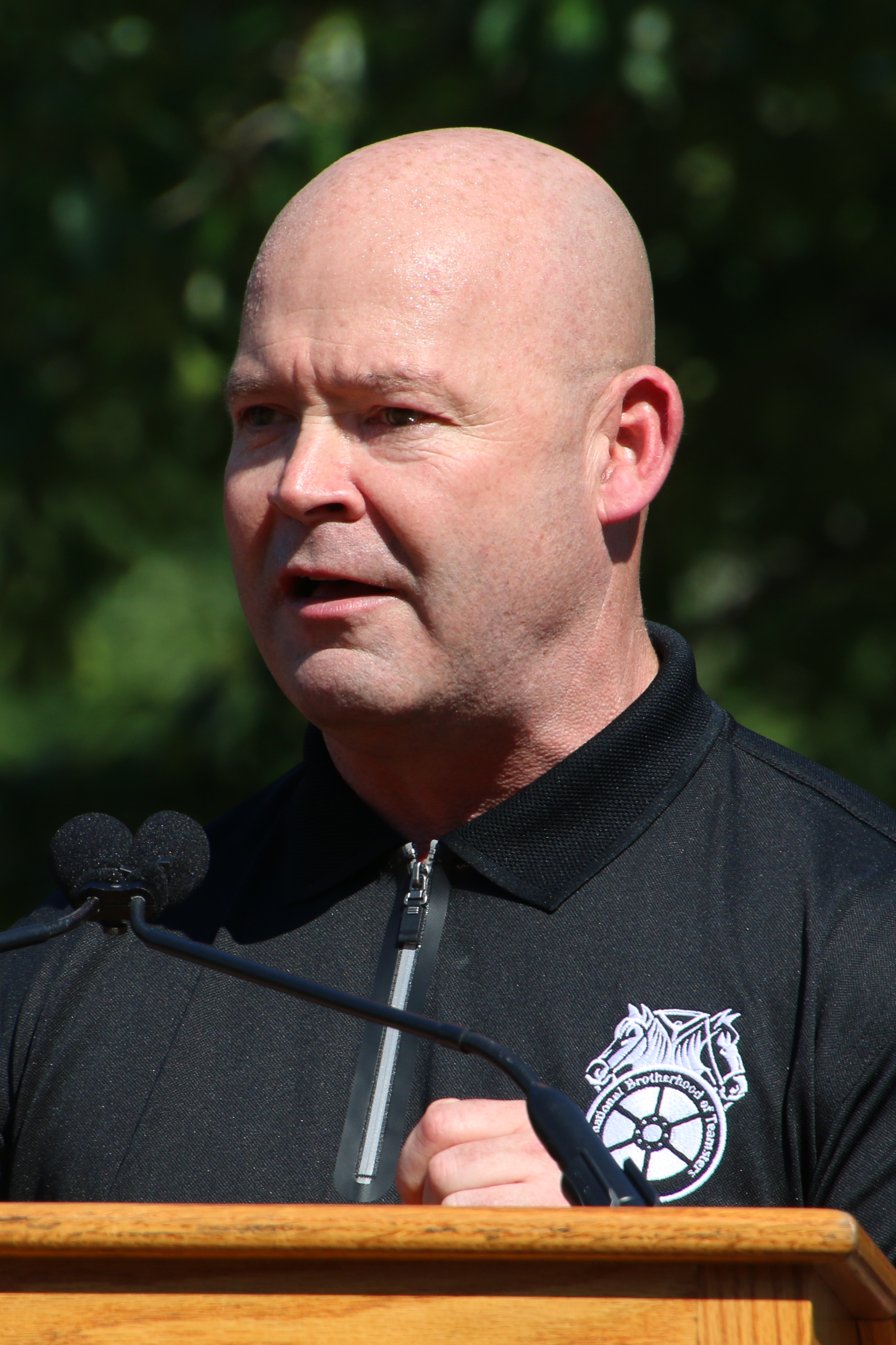
- O'Brien speaking on Independence Mall in Philadelphia in 2022
- Born: Sean M. O'Brien; 1971 or 1972 (age 54–55); Medford, Massachusetts, US
- Occupation: Trade unionist
- Title: General President of the International Brotherhood of Teamsters (since 2022)
- Sean M. O'Brien's voice O'Brien speaking on the need for unionization Recorded November 14, 2023

Sean Michael O'Brien (born 1971 or 1972) is an American labor leader who is the General President of the International Brotherhood of Teamsters. He formerly served as the Vice President Eastern Region of the International Brotherhood of Teamsters (IBT).

O'Brien was the youngest person elected as President of Teamsters Local Union 25 and was the Secretary-Treasurer of New England Joint Council 10. O'Brien resigned from Local 25 and Joint Council 10 on March 1, 2022, in order to serve full-time as General President of the International Brotherhood of Teamsters. O'Brien was sworn into office as the 11th General President of the International Brotherhood of Teamsters at the union's headquarters in Washington, D.C., on March 22, 2022.

== Early life ==
O'Brien grew up in Medford, Massachusetts, in a family of Teamsters. His father, grandfather, and great-grandfather were all members of Local 25 in Boston, driving trucks. O'Brien attended University of Massachusetts Boston for one semester before joining Local 25 in 1991.

== Teamster leadership ==
In 2006, O'Brien was elected president of Local 25, and was re-elected six times before becoming General President. In the fifteen-year span of his presidency, the local's membership increased by 30%, notably organizing a group of more than 1,000 parking lot attendants, many of whom were immigrants from East Africa.

In 2013, O'Brien was suspended for two weeks for threatening members of the reform group Teamsters for a Democratic Union (TDU) who were opposing one of his allies. O'Brien apologized and the lead TDU advocate in the episode later supported him.

In 2017, O'Brien was the lead negotiator for the Teamsters with United Parcel Service (UPS) during bargaining for a new national contract, covering approximately 240,000 drivers, package sorters, loaders and clerks. He was dismissed from his position as Package Division director by James P. Hoffa after reaching out to Teamster Locals and members that had opposed Hoffa's reelection as general president.

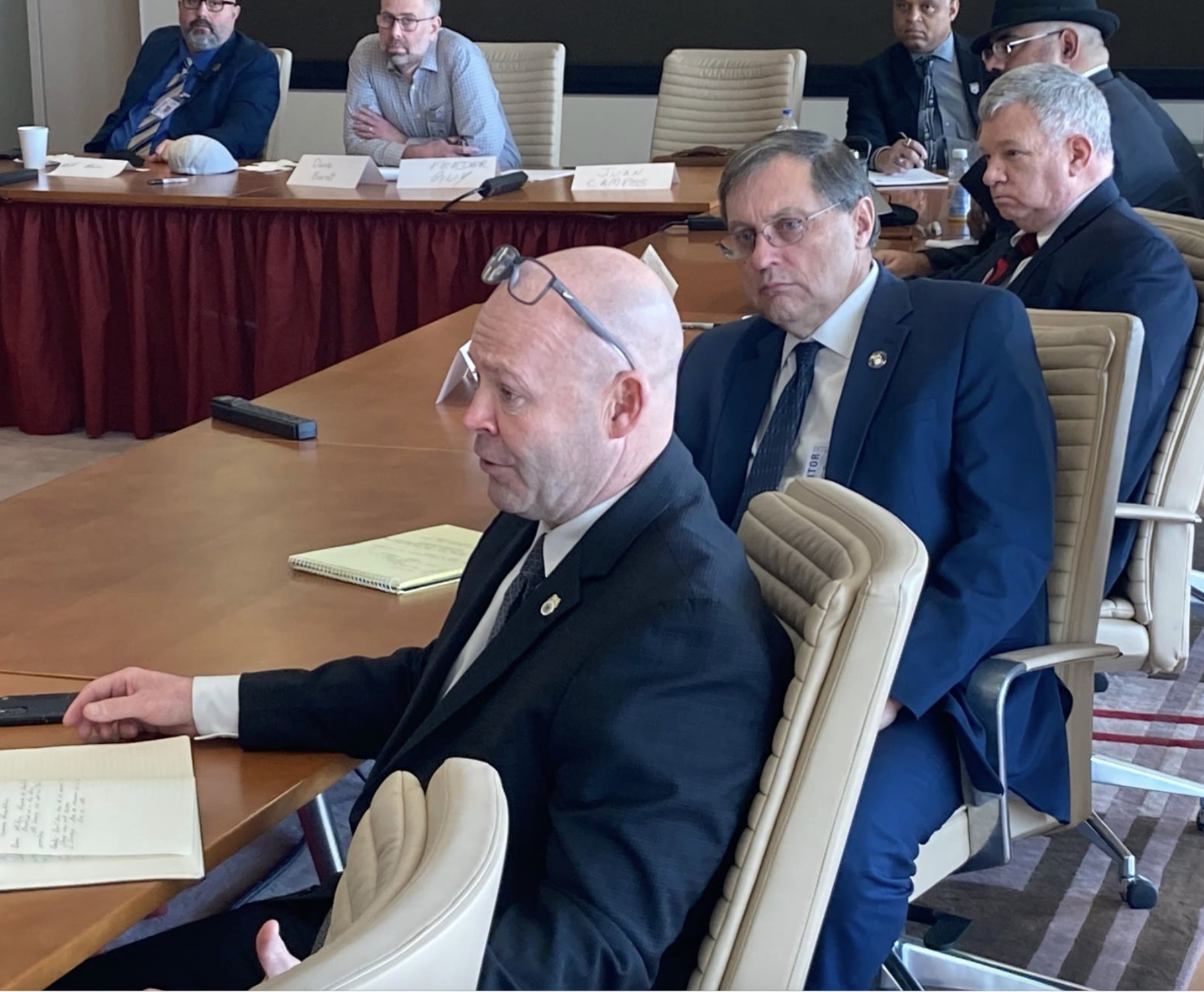
O'Brien (front) with General Secretary-Treasurer-Elect Fred Zuckerman and other officials during a transition meeting

=== Campaign for the general presidency of the IBT ===
In May 2018 O'Brien announced his candidacy to run against long-standing General President James P. Hoffa of the International Brotherhood of Teamsters. Hoffa eventually decided not to seek reelection and instead endorsed Steve Vairma, another vice president. The Sean O'Brien and Fred Zuckerman Slate was endorsed by Teamsters for a Democratic Union (a rank and file teamster reform organization) in November 2019 after a UPS contract was signed, despite a majority of members voting against the contract terms. O'Brien also campaigned on organizing Amazon workers. In November 2021, O'Brien was elected, defeating Vairma in a rare win for a candidate who was neither an incumbent nor endorsed by the incumbent Teamsters president. O'Brien assumed the role in March 2022.

=== Local 25 charity work ===
Under O'Brien's leadership Local 25 has raised more than $5,000,000 for charitable causes.

=== Dispute with Markwayne Mullin ===
While testifying at a March 2023 hearing at the Senate Health, Education, Labor and Pensions Committee, O'Brien got into an argument, including back-and-forth insults, with US Senator from Oklahoma Markwayne Mullin. Afterwards, O'Brien tweeted at Mullin numerous times. When O'Brien next appeared in front of the same committee in November of that year, Mullin followed up on those tweets, which he said had challenged him to a fight, and told O'Brien that he accepted. As the two continued to insult each other, Mullin made clear that he was ready for a physical altercation. Vermont Senator Bernie Sanders, the committee chairman, jumped in to try to calm tensions, reminding Mullin that his behavior was not acceptable for a United States senator and urging him to stick to questions about labor. Mullin later stated that he and O'Brien met after the altercation, where they "had a great two-hour conversation" and O'Brien "stood up and apologized" to him.

=== 2024 United States presidential election ===
On July 15, 2024, O'Brien became the first leader of the IBT ever to speak at a Republican National Convention, where he gave a speech encouraging delegates to respect American labor in spite of differing political allegiances. According to a Teamsters spokesperson, O'Brien also requested to speak at the 2024 Democratic National Convention. A Teamsters spokesperson said the DNC never responded to O'Brien's request for a speaker slot at the Democratic convention. Despite historical affiliations with the Democratic Party, the Teamsters decided not to endorse a candidate in the 2024 presidential election after an internal poll revealed that 60% of their members supported Trump. After this, joint councils for the states of Washington, Michigan, Nevada, Pennsylvania, and Wisconsin individually endorsed Harris.
