= Teamster Boss: The Jackie Presser Story =

1992 American television film

- Based on: Mobbed Up by James Neff
- Screenplay by: Abby Mann
- Directed by: Alastair Reid
- Starring: Brian Dennehy; Jeff Daniels; María Conchita Alonso; Eli Wallach; Robert Prosky; Donald Moffat
- Composer: Brad Fiedel
- Country of origin: United States
- Original language: English

Production
- Producer: John Kemeny
- Cinematography: Elemér Ragályi
- Editor: Steven Cohen
- Production companies: Abby Mann Productions; HBO Pictures

Original release
- Network: HBO
- Release: September 12, 1992

Teamster Boss: The Jackie Presser Story is a 1992 American television drama film directed by Alastair Reid and written by Abby Mann. It is based on the 1989 book Mobbed Up by James Neff. The film stars Brian Dennehy, Jeff Daniels, María Conchita Alonso, Eli Wallach, Robert Prosky and Donald Moffat. It premiered on HBO on September 12, 1992.

== Plot ==
A union boss rises and falls playing both sides of the street with mobsters and the federal government.

== Cast ==
- Brian Dennehy as Jackie Presser
- Jeff Daniels as Tom Noonan
- María Conchita Alonso as Carmen De La Portilla-Presser
- Eli Wallach as Bill Presser
- Robert Prosky as Maishe
- Donald Moffat as O'Connell
- Al Waxman as Allen
- Tony Lo Bianco as Allen Dorfman
- Kate Reid as Faye
- Brad Sullivan as Dickerson
- Jude Ciccolella as Tony
- Victor Slezak as Sanger
- Val Avery as Salerno
- Frank Pellegrino as Anthony Provenzano
- Henderson Forsythe as Senator Bruckmeyer
- Tony Darrow as Nardi
- Norma Dell'Agnese as Linda
- Victor Ertmanis as Danny Greene
- Shannon Lawson as Cindy
- Conrad Bergschneider as Heavy
- Peter Bray as The Animal
- Richard Bright as The Bomber
- Peter Dvorsky as Mehren
- Gerald Gordon as Williams
- Howard Jerome as Minetta
- Elizabeth Lennie as Nancy
- Doug Lennox as Grogan
- James Millington as Maynard
- Bernie McInerney as Clines
- Jack Newman as Samuels
- Pat Patterson as Halluska
- Richard Poe as Bishop
- Steven Randazzo as Joey "The Clown"
- Michael J. Reynolds as Brock
- Michael Rhoades as Finnerty
- Maria Ricossa as Dorothy
- George R. Robertson as Howard Cannon
- Rhona Shekter as Gerry
- Larry Solway as Climaco
- Marc Strange as Garrity
- Catherine Swing as Secretary
- Al Therrien as Donovan
- Lenore Zann as Betty
