= Hondo Crouch =

American folklorist

John Russell "Hondo" Crouch (pen name Peter Cedarstacker; December 4, 1916– September 27, 1976) was a Texas rancher-folklorist-humorist and one of the owners who founded and made famous the town of Luckenbach, Texas.

== Early life ==
Crouch was born in Hondo, Texas to Ione and Harry Crouch. A self-taught swimmer, Hondo was named an all-American swimmer at the University of Texas (UT) and in 1939, was elected captain of the swimming team. He attended UT until 1941, when he graduated with a bachelor's degree in physical education. He was a swimming coach at various Texas children's camps from the 1930s until the 1970s. In 1964, he was president of the Hall of Fame for UT athletes. In 1975, he played a major role in persuading the university to build the Texas Swimming Center.

== Career ==
Using the pen name Peter Cedarstacker, Crouch wrote hundreds of "Cedar Creek Clippings" for The Comfort News. His characters in the mythical town of Cedar Creek presented satirical takes on politics, government, ecology, deer hunters, social life, everyday country problems and small town celebrations.

Crouch took part in a Folklife Festival for Texas at the Smithsonian Institution in 1964. That year the Saturday Evening Post ran a photograph of Crouch with a story called “LBJ Country.”

In 1971, he, his wife, and actor Guich Koock bought the town of Luckenbach, a small community in the Texas Hill Country that was first established as an Indian trading post by Albert Luckenbach, a German immigrant, in 1849. The town included a post office, general store, bar, and dance hall. Acting as the town's mock mayor, he established a series of farcical celebrations, including the Luckenbach World's Fair, the first Texas "women only" chili cook-off, and the Return of the Mud Daubers. It was a well-known gathering space for songwriters, musicians, and artists in central Texas.

Crouch was interviewed on Our Fellow Americans, a Canadian documentary television miniseries which aired on CBC Television in 1976. The eight-episode series featured interviews with various people in the United States in recognition of that nation's bicentennial. Crouch received coverage for urging the Non-Buy Centennial, to protest the commercialization of the bicentennial of the U.S. Declaration of Independence.

== Personal life ==
He was married to Helen Ruth "Shatzie" Stieler. They had four children. In 1979, his daughter Becky Crouch Patterson published his biography called Hondo, My Father. Their daughter Cris and her husband established a restaurant and live music hall in Fredericksburg, Hondo's on Main, in a historic stone building that once produced and housed plows, wagons, and guns.

Crouch died of a heart attack in 1976.
