= Shadow of a Doubt (disambiguation) =

Shadow of a Doubt is a 1943 film directed by Alfred Hitchcock.

Shadow of a Doubt or Shadow of Doubt may also refer to:

== Film and television ==
=== Films ===
- Shadow of Doubt (1935 film), an American mystery film
- Shadow of a Doubt (1991 film), an American television film
- Shadow of a Doubt (1993 film), a French drama film
- Shadow of a Doubt (1995 film), an American television film written and directed by, and starring, Brian Dennehy
- Shadow of Doubt (1998 film), an American independent mystery-thriller film
- Shadow of Doubt, a 2013 documentary by Eve Ash

=== Television episodes ===
- "Shadow of a Doubt" (Altered Carbon)
- "Shadow of a Doubt" (The Best Years episode)
- "Shadow of a Doubt" (Dallas)
- "Shadow of a Doubt" (Mona the Vampire)
- "A Shadow of Doubt" (Duggan)

== Literature ==
- Shadow of Doubt, a 1935 novel by Arthur Somers Roche
- Shadow of a Doubt, a 1961 novel by Harrison Judd, basis for the 1978 film The Witness
- Shadow of a Doubt, a 1981 novel by June Thomson
- Shadow of a Doubt, a 1989 novel by Deborah Gaines under the pseudonym Carolyn Keene, the 40th installment of The Nancy Drew Files
- Shadow of a Doubt, a 1991 novel by William J. Coughlin
- Shadow of a Doubt, a 1998 novel by Ted Allbeury
- Shadow of Doubt, a 1998 novel by Terri Blackstock
- Shadow of Doubt, a 2008 novel by Norah McClintock
- Shadow of Doubt, a 2024 novel by Brad Thor

== Music ==
=== Albums ===
- Shadow of a Doubt (album), by Freddie Gibbs, 2015
- Shadow of Doubt (album), by Skrew, 1996

=== Songs ===
- "Shadow of a Doubt" (song), by Earl Thomas Conley, 1991
- "Shadow of a Doubt", by Beth Orton from Comfort of Strangers, 2005
- "Shadow of a Doubt", by Petra from God Fixation, 1998
- "Shadow of a Doubt", by Roxette from Look Sharp!, 1988
- "Shadow of a Doubt", by Sonic Youth from Evol, 1986
- "Shadow of a Doubt (A Complex Kid)", by Tom Petty and the Heartbreakers from Damn the Torpedoes, 1979
- "A Shadow of Doubt", by Danny Elfman from the Batman Returns film soundtrack, 1992

== Other uses ==
- The Shadow of Doubt, a 1955 play by Norman King
- Shadow of Doubt: Probing the Supreme Court, a 2010 book by Marites Vitug

== See also ==
- Beyond the shadow of a doubt, a legal standard of proof
