= List of Honey, I Shrunk the Kids: The TV Show episodes =

The episode list for the television series Honey, I Shrunk the Kids: The TV Show, based on the feature films. The series premiered on September 1, 1997 and ended on May 20, 2000 with 66 episodes spanning 3 seasons.

The series has been released on DVD in some regions.

== Series overview ==
Season	Episodes	Originally released	
Season	Episodes	First released	Last released
1	22	September 22, 1997	May 16, 1998
2	22	September 26, 1998	June 12, 1999
3	22	September 25, 1999	May 20, 2000

== Episodes ==
=== Season 1 (1997–98) ===
No. overall	No. in season	Title	Directed by	Written by	Original release date	Prod. code
1	1	"Honey, We've Been Swallowed by Grandpa"	David Grossman	Ed Ferrara & Kevin Murphy	September 22, 1997	101
Wayne, Diane, and Amy are accidentally shrunk to near-microscopic size. Soon after, Grandpa Murdock (Eugene Roche) drops by to pick up Nick for a fishing trip. Nick feigns illness to avoid going with him. He then leaves, but not before inadvertently swallowing his shrunken relatives, van and all. Nick interprets Wayne's help message in the newspaper and realizing what has happened, he rushes to his family's aid.
2	2	"Honey, The House is Trying to Kill Us"	Tom Spezialy	Chris Black	October 4, 1997	103
Wayne becomes concerned about his family's safety and invents a security system for their protection. F.R.A.N. (Petrea Burchard), the Felon Repeller and Accident Neutralizer takes her duties very seriously and involves herself in every facet of the household. Diane is wary of the overprotective computer, not realizing that F.R.A.N. has developed a mind of her own. When Wayne decides to pull the plug, F.R.A.N. holds the Szalinskis under "house arrest." Wayne and his family try to stop F.R.A.N. before it's too late. Guest stars: Lee Tergesen
3	3	"Honey, I'm Haunted"	William Malone	Josh Stolberg	October 11, 1997	104
Wayne invents something that could make your vision perfect so Nick tries it out and can see practically anything, even dead people. He befriends a "friendly" ghost who gets into Wayne's body and Nick realizes that the ghost isn't all that good. So he along with Wayne attempt to get control of his body so they can get the ghost out. Guest stars: Robert Torti, Duncan Fraser, Dale Wilson, Lachlan Murdoch
4	4	"Honey, We're Stuck in the '70s"	Valerie Breiman	Jim Lincoln & Dan Studney	October 18, 1997	102
Amy is in love with her teacher and when she finds out that Wayne has made a time machine, the Szalinski Time Hopper, she decides to go back to the 70s to meet him when he was 17. She goes back to 1976 and after numerous attempts decides not to return. Nick tells Wayne, who goes back in time to rescue her before she suffers the ill effects of temporal displacement. While he is in the past, he runs into teenage Diane and he figures out how to make up for both a forgotten wedding anniversary and a Time Hopper problem. Guest stars: Lochlyn Munro, Peter Bryant
5	5	"Honey, I Shrunk the Science Dude"	Savage Steve Holland	Kat Likkel	October 25, 1997	106
Wayne accidentally shrinks himself and his brother, Randy, who find themselves in little trouble when they are mistaken for McDonald's Happy Meal Toys and brought home to a young boy who happens to be a fan of Randy's TV show, 'Randy Rude: The Science Dude' (a parody of Bill Nye the Science Guy). Guest stars: Tom McGowan
6	6	"Honey, You've Got Nine Lives"	Robert Ginty	Jim Lincoln & Dan Studney	November 1, 1997	105
When Wayne invents a neuron nudger, Diane accidentally turns it on and swaps her brain with that of Bianca's cat. Bianca, Wayne's scheming coworker, switches Wayne's brain with Quark's so she can use Wayne's body to access his vault at work. Nick and Amy then try to switch Wayne, Diane, and Bianca's brain back to their correct bodies.
7	7	"Honey, I Got Duped"	Scott McGinnis	Sarit Katz & Gloria Ketterer	November 8, 1997	108
While Wayne works on controlling the cloning of himself, one of his new selves takes his place at work, where Bianca becomes suspicious of his geniality. Wayne is down because his clone is doing better than the real him. She gives his clone a friendship bracelet that is a tracking device, she befriends the clone and then uses him to kidnap Wayne. Guest stars: Chris Kramer
8	8	"Honey, They're After Me Lucky Charms"	Damon Santostefano	Jim Lincoln & Dan Studney	November 15, 1997	109
Wayne's invention succeeds in finding gold - a pot of doubloons claimed by a leprechaun, who puts a curse on the Szalinskis until they hand it over. Guest stars: Paul Williams, Michael Kopsa
9	9	"Honey, They Call Me the Space Cowboy"	Tony Dow	Ed Ferrara & Kevin Murphy	November 22, 1997	110
To return from a time trip to 1864 Colorado, the Szalinskis must help an alien recover his starship from a ruthless gang, who master the alien's weapons and defenses.
10	10	"Honey, I Know What You're Thinking"	Robert Ginty	Matt Kiene & Joe Reinkemeyer	November 29, 1997	107
Wayne's chemical to increase intelligence has different effects on the family, including mind reading and levitation, while their dog, Quark, is able to hypnotize people. Guest stars: Regis Philbin, Kathie Lee Gifford
11	11	"Honey, You're Living in the Past"	Scott McGinnis	Kari Lizer	December 6, 1997	111
Diane wants to get in touch with her teenage-self so that she can understand what Amy and her new client, Howard, are going through. Wayne has invented a machine where you can see yourself in the past. When the electricity goes out, Diane is stuck as a teenager. Now Wayne must fix the machine and the family has to deal with Diane and her rebellious self. Guest stars: Jesse Moss
12	12	"Honey, I'm Streakin'"	Savage Steve Holland	Kat Likkel	January 3, 1998	112
Wayne feels overwhelmed with the demands of work and his family so he invents something that will make him go from place to place in seconds. He sets the level on high and somehow travels at the speed of light. Jennings finds a copy of the invention and is traveling fast too and playing tricks on people. The two of them get stuck at hyperspeed and must use another Szalinski invention to slow their molecules. Guest stars: Graham Jarvis
13	13	"Honey, Meet the Barbarians"	Gary Jones	Matt Kiene & Joe Reinkemeyer	February 7, 1998	113
Wayne accidentally blows up the mayor's car in front of the mayor which upsets Diane, who wants to run for the school board, so he goes back in time to redo things. He accidentally goes back to the time of "the barbarians". When Wayne comes back he accidentally brings the "Barbarians" with him but when he tries to send them back the machine is broken. The barbarians become involved in the school board race when they are convinced that Diane's rival is an evil Norse god. Guest stars: Ritch Brinkley, Carol Hoyt, Rick Ravanello
14	14	"Honey, You've Drained My Brain"	Scott McGinnis	Story by : Kat Likkel; Teleplay by : Dan Studney & Kevin Murphy	February 14, 1998	114
Diane is very nervous about her case against a tough lawyer so Wayne invents a thinky ring to help her retrieve her thoughts better. Unfortunately, she becomes a brain sucking vampire. Wayne finds out and goes after her to lure her home. Nick manages to get the ring off but this turns him into a brain sucking vampire. Diane figures things out and plots to fight Nick and get the ring off before he takes over the world. Guest stars: Drew Pillsbury, Lorena Gale
15	15	"Honey, He's Not Abominable... He's Just Misunderstood"	Carl Gottlieb	Ed Ferrara & Jim Lincoln	February 21, 1998	115
Wayne turns Amy's bicycle into a super speed mountain bike. Amy goes on a bike ride through the woods, crashes, twists her ankle and finds refuge in a cave. Amy meets Bigfoot and she names him George after Curious George. He saves her and takes Amy to her house. Now the family must get him back along with his wife, a Yeti. Guest stars: Rick Overton, Bruce Hunter
16	16	"Honey, I'm in the Mood for Love"	Tony Dow	Josh Stolberg	February 28, 1998	116
Since Diane is allergic to chocolate Wayne tries to remove the allergic compound from the chocolate, but accidentally creates a chocolate that makes people fall in love. Damon, Amy's best friend, has a crush on Amy and Nick tries to get Amy to eat the chocolate. When she finds out how the chocolates work, she tries to get her crush "the make out king" to eat it. Diane, Wayne, Tiara, and a mutated Dr. Jennings also eat the chocolates, so Nick has to find the antidote that will make everyone (relatively) normal again. Guest stars: Thomas Ian Nicholas, Aaron Smolinski
17	17	"Honey, The Bear Is Bad News"	Scott McGinnis	Kat Likkel	March 28, 1998	117
Wayne reluctantly has to make a toy bear more high tech after sharing his feelings at Jentech West. He makes the bear, Fwuffy, smart and, while downloading data onto his computer chip, a virus named Legion is also downloaded. Now Fwuffy is bent on taking over the world and the family now must stop him before he can wreak havoc. Guest stars: Ed Ferrara
18	18	"From Honey, With Love"	Victoria Hochberg	Jim Lincoln & Dan Studney	April 4, 1998	118
Wayne is contracted by a group of Canadian spies to help them recover a stolen submarine, but the situation becomes increasingly complicated when several of the spies are taken out of commission, forcing Wayne and his family to go undercover to stop a supervillain from enacting his plan. Guest stars: Jeff Griggs, Nigel Bennett, Kira Clavell
19	19	"Honey, I'm Dreaming... But Am I?"	Michael Lange	Matt Kiene & Joe Reinkemeyer	April 22, 1998	120
The prospect of dissecting a frog is giving Nick nightmares so Wayne invents a dream machine that would go into Nick's dream. He kills the frog but is threatened never to come back into the dream world again. Amy, against her dad's wishes, goes in so she can annoy Nick, so now the family can't sleep or else they could die. Guest stars: Lawrence Bayne, Hiro Kanagawa
20	20	"Honey, the Garbage Is Taking Us Out"	Scott McGinnis	Jeff Vlaming	May 2, 1998	121
Wayne, wanting to please Nick, invents a Refuse Ingesting Protozoa or RIP that can eat anything. Jennings, who is being tracked by an environmentalist, puts toxic waste in Wayne's invention. RIP infected Quark, Quark infected the mail-man and so on. Now Wayne and family must stop these garbage-eating-zombies and get them to Jentech West where there is a high security system. Guest stars: Dylan Neal, John Stewart
21	21	"Honey, You're So Transparent"	Savage Steve Holland	Jordana Arkin	May 9, 1998	122
Wayne's Chameleonator makes people invisible. The Chameleonator was originally made to change the people's skin color, so they wouldn't need to use make-up anymore. A mole in the company is telling another company about the invention. Amy and Wayne must stop the mole and get his invention back from the company that took it. Guest stars: Charlotte Booker, Brian Stollery
22	22	"Honey, It's No Fun Being an Illegal Alien"	Tony Dow	Ed Ferrara & Kevin Murphy	May 16, 1998	119
Ar'nox the alien, who was in "Honey, They Call Me The Space Cowboy", returns. This time he comes for a visit only to have his space ship stolen again. Now the Szalinski must get the space ship back, stolen from the so called "Men in Black". Guest stars: Don S. Davis, Dean Haglund, Bruce Harwood, Jim Leyden, Tyler Labine, Yee Jee Tso

=== Season 2 (1998–99) ===
No. overall	No. in season	Title	Directed by	Written by	Original release date	Prod. code
23	1	"Honey, It's Quarkzilla"	David Grossman	Ed Naha	September 26, 1998	201
Wayne invents a way to make veggies bigger, only it turns the veggies into big bad mutants. Quark eats some of the stuff after the Szalinskis killed the Mutant Veggies. So now Quark is mutating and looks like Godzilla! Can the family get Quark back to normal before he destroys the town? Note: This was the first episode to use a new opening sequence replacing the animated one, as this one is using clips from various episodes from season 1 against some sort of computer monitor with blueprints. This opening is also used for all seasons on some syndicated markets.
24	2	"Honey, She's Like a Fish Out of Water"	Scott McGinnis	Kat Likkel	October 3, 1998	203
Wayne creates a skin lotion to make people become great swimmers like fish in the water. Amy takes some of it to a pool party that she is invited to. When Amy uses the lotion, she becomes the life of the pool party so the girl who the party is being held for tries it as well. However, things go terribly wrong when the girls find the lotion has turned them into "mermaids". They'll end up completely turning into fish unless Wayne can create an antidote. However, things get even worse when the desperate and greedy owner of the pool kidnaps the girls to use them as a money-making attraction. Guest stars: Jon Polito, Terry Lawrence, Lenard Stanga
25	3	"Honey, It's Doomsday"	Michael Lange	Ed Naha	October 17, 1998	205
Wayne sees a meteorite heading for earth through his super scope. Whilst the people in town cause havoc and the people at Jentech are acting crazy, Wayne must figure out how to stop the asteroids. Things get a little more complicated when Jennings brother has a launch system to blow up the meteorite while Wayne finds out there is life on the asteroid. Can he save the world? Guest stars: Marc Singer, Doug Lennox, Shawn Macdonald, Mark Holmes, Chris Humphreys, John Stewart, Maureen Jones
26	4	"Honey, Let's Trick or Treat"	Stuart Gordon	Matt Kiene & Joe Reinkemeyer	October 24, 1998	206
Amy and Nick are less interested in hanging out with friends, and spend Halloween with Wayne. Wayne creates the Szalinski Scan-O-Caster a machine that scans illustrations, converts the narrative into tangible holograms, and projects the stories as 3D images. An accident causes a book to fall on the machine, turn it on and make all the Urban legends come to life, including a hook-handed stalker and an alligator in the sewers. Meanwhile there's a new kid at Nick's school, David Foaf. Guest stars: Michael Berryman, Sean Smith, Eric Johnson, A.J. Edmond, Farron Dearden, Shane Vajda, Catherine Myles, Daniel Libman
27	5	"Honey, I'm Rooting for the Hometeam"	Peter Scolari	Roger Reitzel	October 31, 1998	202
Nick is upset because he is having trouble playing baseball so he asks his dad to make some inventions to help him play baseball better. Elsewhere, Diane is worried about her recital and Amy uses a cream that camouflages pimples but she uses too much and it hides her nose. Guest stars: Bob Amaral, Cathy Trien, David Capelle, Lorette Clow
28	6	"Honey, We're Young at Heart"	Francis Damberger	Adam Campbell	November 7, 1998	207
Wayne has invented a machine that will make old people feel and act younger. However, it takes Diane and Wayne's youth, giving it to an older couple; the effects take a long time to kick in. As the other couple grows young and prepubescent, Wayne and Diane grow older and scared for their lives. Can Nick and Amy find the old couple and bring them back before Wayne dies of old age unable to reverse the process? Guest stars: Beverly Leech, Todd Waring, Sarah Lind, Chas Harrison, Britt McKillip, York Myers
29	7	"Honey, We're Past Tense"	Scott McGinnis	Craig Volk	November 14, 1998	208
Wayne and his family are going camping with the chief and his kids. Wayne makes a home away from home that he carries on his back. At night time during a storm it takes them back to the prehistoric age and now they must figure out a way to get back to their own time. Guest stars: Cathy Trien
30	8	"Honey, I'm Wrestling with a Problem... and the Chief"	John Bell	Roger Reitzel	November 21, 1998	210
After wrestlers Bret and Owen Hart are injured at the Szalinskis', Wayne and the Chief agree to take their places in a match, aided by Wayne's remote-controlled bodysuit. What they don't know is their opponents are escaped prisoners from Baltimore that Chief put away and they want revenge on him. Guest stars: Cathy Trien, Dan Joffre, Philip Maurice Hayes, David Capelle, Keith Arbuthnot
31	9	"Honey, the Bunny Bit It"	Adam Weissman	Kat Likkel	December 5, 1998	209
Nick invents a machine of his own in an attempt to resurrect his dead pet bunny, Copernicus. Things go wrong when his invention summons a monstrous creature from another dimension that possesses the body of his deceased friend. Guest stars: Arturo Gil, Catherine Gell, Rainer Kahl, Justin "Judd" Palmer, Steven Kenderes, Keith Arbuthnot
32	10	"Honey, I've Joined the Bigtop"	John Bell	Brenda Lilly	December 12, 1998	204
Nick is running from a bunch of bullies when he takes a hard fall and a circus takes him home. The head guy steals everything in Wayne's lab so now the family must rescue Nick and they must do this by joining the circus themselves. Guest stars: Jerry Kernion, Lynda Boyd, Marianne Muellerleile, Reuben Thompson, A.J. Edmond, Dan Willmott, Michael J. Anderson
33	11	"Honey, I'm the Sorcerer's Apprentice"	Scott McGinnis	Sandy Gunter	December 19, 1998	211
To save his bankrupt company, Jennings sends Wayne to find a magical stone that can turn metal into gold. But Jennings' greed alters the stone's power. Guest stars: Bryan Cranston, Bernard Cuffling
34	12	"Honey, I'm King of the Rocket Guys"	Francis Damberger	Ed Naha	January 30, 1999	212
Wayne works on a superhero suit to combat a crime wave by off-road bikers. Will this invention work, or will it backfire like usual? Guest stars: Keith Szarabajka, Andrew Misle, Ty Olsson, Jay Hilliker, Lorette Clow
35	13	"Honey, the Future's Coming Back to Me"	John Tindall	Bill Kenny & Michael Lato	February 6, 1999	213
Amy and Nick are kidnapped by a cyborg from the future, a result of Jennings' misuse of Wayne's environment-friendly car. Guest stars: Jane Sowerby, Matt Hill, Stephen Massicotte, Susan Aceron, John Stewart
36	14	"Honey, It's a Miracle"	Scott McGinnis	Craig Volk	February 13, 1999	215
Amy's use of a mental enhancer inadvertently gives her the power to control nature, which goes to her head as she establishes herself as a supreme ruler. Guest stars: Simon Webb, John McLean, Nancy O'Dell
37	15	"Honey, You'll Always Be a Princess to Me"	Victoria Hochberg	Kat Likkel	February 20, 1999	216
Diane is suffering a mid-life crisis in which she tries to look younger and after a trip to the museum with her husband and son, she finds out about a spell that could make her younger. Diane translates the tablets against Wayne's wishes and unknowingly wakes up as an evil princess. Now it is up to the Szalinski family to fight the evil princess and get Diane back. Meanwhile, the chief tries to beat Wayne in a spring decoration contest. Guest stars: Larry Cedar
38	16	"Honey, There's a Pox on Our House"	Adam Weissman	Roger Reitzel	February 27, 1999	214
Jennings romantically pursues Diane after using Wayne's "Electric Chair of Love"; Amy and Nick contract chicken pox, forcing Diane to move into a hotel. Only one thing’s for sure: this won't end well for Jennings. Guest stars: Thomas Alexander, Lorette Clow
39	17	"Honey, I'm Going to Teach You a Lesson"	Hayma Washington	Matt Kiene & Joe Reinkemeyer	April 24, 1999	218
Amy's science teacher quits unexpectedly so her dad volunteers to teach. He makes a formula to make him charming so that the students will like him. Amy catches him and tries to alter the formula, however something goes wrong and the formula makes Wayne act like a bad person. Now it is up to the rest of the family to find a way to get Wayne back. Meanwhile, Diane and Nick try to give Quark a bath. Guest stars: Kett Turton, Chris Hastings, Lisa Christie, Cary Stephen Berglund, Brian Gromoff, Nadene Rogers, Christine Lippa, Keith Arbuthnot
40	18	"Honey, It's the Ghostest with the Mostest"	Scott McGinnis	Ed Naha	May 8, 1999	220
A new boss has taken over Jentech west and there is a new guy. Wayne's uncle finds out some info about this guy after Wayne told him to leave him alone and not interfere. This turns out to be important info because the guy who became Wayne's new supervisor is plagiarist, who steals inventions and patents them as his own. Guest stars: Monte Markham, Tom Poston, David Leisure, Kirk Jarrett, Robert Thurston, Val Planche, Keith Arbuthnot
41	19	"Honey, It's a Blunderful Life"	Scott McGinnis	Ed Naha	May 15, 1999	217
Wayne is knocked senseless by a tree while trudging home in a blizzard and awakens to find himself on trial in Dreamland because of his erratic inventions. Guest stars: Cathy Trien, Lawrence Bayne, George Ball, Cristine Rose, Justin "Judd" Palmer, Steven Kenderes, Keith Arbuthnot, Petrea Burchard, Ed Ferrara, John Keelan, Michael Kopsa, Larry Reese, Eugene Roche
42	20	"Honey, It's Your Party"	Peter Scolari	Steve Chivers & Curt Shepard	May 22, 1999	219
While Wayne and Diane are out celebrating the anniversary of their first date, Amy's party is crashed by a group of aliens contacted by Nick using one of Wayne's communication gizmos. One of the aliens, through his bizarre home world customs, marries Amy after using a device to make the family somewhat subservient to her. Finding out their true origins, Amy demands her family be turned back to normal and their "marriage" be ended. Both are undone and the aliens part ways on good terms. Guest stars: John Patrick White, Cathy Trien, Wilson Wong, Jeremy Radick, Kristian Ayre, Janet Pinnick
43	21	"Honey, I'm Not Just Clowning Around"	Jonathan Hackett	Kat Likkel	May 29, 1999	222
Wayne invents an invention called the 3iDer which turns people into different people. The invention and Wayne got nominated for the inventors recognition achievement award. An evil clown tries to steal the invention and frame Wayne so it is up to the Szalinski family to stop this clown and clear Wayne's name. Guest stars: Monte Markham, Michael McShane, Cathy Trien, Henry Beckman, William Samples, Catherine Myles, John Stewart
44	22	"Honey, I'll Be Right Witch You"	Adam Weissman	Roger Reitzel	June 12, 1999	221
Wayne's comment at a seminar offends some witches. The witches cast spells on the family. Now they must stop the witches and get Nick back. Guest stars: Cathy Trien, Mary Pat Gleason, Diane Robin, Marissa Jaret Winokur, Stephen Strachan, Chris Kramer, Lorette Clow, Keith Arbuthnot

=== Season 3 (1999–2000) ===
No. overall	No. in season	Title	Directed by	Written by	Original release date	Prod. code
45	1	"Honey, Name That Tune"	John Landis	Amy Engelberg & Wendy Engelberg	September 25, 1999	304
Wayne goes back in time to prove to his family that the Bopkas and the song he likes really do exist. There he finds out that they are actually Russian spies with plans to take over the world by hypnotizing teenagers. The family goes back in time to stop them.
46	2	"Honey, It's a Billion Dollar Brain"	Francis Damberger	Ed Naha	October 2, 1999	302
Wayne brings a dead man's brain back to life, hoping to swap scientific ideas for inventions with him. However, the brain begins longing for the life he never had: a happy family. To this end, he (still having his "mind" stuck in the past) hypnotises Wayne's family; Diane is turned into a housewife, Amy becomes swedish, Nick becomes a punk, and Mr Jennings becomes a goofy golfer. With this done, he now plans to put his own brain in Wayne's head. Can Wayne undo the hypnotism done to his family and get rid of this brain?
47	3	"Honey, It Takes Two to Mambo"	Scott McGinnis	Kat Likkel	October 9, 1999	301
Diane's sister, Elaine, is in town and as Wayne doesn't like her he invents something so he can't understand her. Wayne's creation fails, and Elaine's personality gets into Wayne's brain. Now the family must work together to get everything back to normal without the help of Wayne.
48	4	"Honey, We're on TV!"	Adam Weissman	Annie DeYoung & Max Enscoe	October 16, 1999	305
Wayne and the kids settle down to watch television during a big storm in town. He has invented a remote control that will bring any TV shows you could ever watch from the past to now. Somehow they get sucked into the TV so when Diane and the Chief come home and find them in the TV they need to try to get Wayne and the kids out.
49	5	"Honey, It's Gloom and Doom"	Adam Weissman	Craig Volk	November 6, 1999	307
Wayne is busy trying to perfect his Hypolyptical Organic Oxide Ray (a.k.a. the Hoo-Ray), a device based on mood-ring technology that will cause people to be happy, thus ending war and boosting global self-esteem. Wayne's new foreign assistant, Vlad Bolvahnicz, cautions that changing nature isn't necessarily a good thing. While working late on the project, Vlad is visited by members of the Global League of Oppressed Madmen (GLOOM). Vlad is actually an anarchist too, and his job at Jentech is part of GLOOM's eco-terrorist plot to teach the industrialized, polluting Western hemisphere a lesson by destroying a key polluter city.
50	6	"Honey, I'm Kung Fu Fighting"	Terry Ingram	Ed Naha	November 13, 1999	310
Ninjas invade Matheson, and the Szalinski family is in for much kung fu fighting to save the town. A monk, Master P'tui, appears to help Wayne and teach him martial arts. Meanwhile, Nick, tired of being bullied into doing other people's homework, invents a spray that can turn anyone into a kung fu expert. Also, Lord Bilious wants Diane to defend him after he tried to bribe town officials and landowners to sell him the town.
51	7	"Honey, I'm Not Up to Par"	Scott McGinnis	Roger Reitzel	November 20, 1999	308
Jennings bets his company even though he can't play golf very well. He asks Wayne to build golf clubs to help them win but Jennings gets hurt so Wayne has to play. Meanwhile Diane and the kids are feeling crowded with Wayne's invention so they decide to sell the stuff they don't use, but after a while people don't like them, so now they have to get them all back.
52	8	"Honey, It's One Small Step for Mankind"	Adam Weissman	Story by : Kat Likkel; Teleplay by : John Hoberg	November 27, 1999	309
Randy Rude the Science Dude comes into town to visit and he wants to get married so Wayne tries to fix him up with the love chair and love booster. Something happens when Randy tries to leave with the van and presses the booster button that blasts them into space. Or are they really in space?
53	9	"Honey, You're Driving Me Like Crazy"	Adam Weissman	Roger Reitzel	December 4, 1999	311
Amy can finally drive so her and the family look for a car and they buy a junk one. Wayne re-designs it completely into the weirdest car you've ever seen. Also included is a safe-t-guy that gives you tips about practically everything. When she takes the car for a trip she tries to stop the safe-t-guy from talking, resulting in making him drive them off the cliff. The family gets a call from Amy and they go after her to stop safe-t-guy and the car from going off the cliff. Will they make it in time?
54	10	"Honey, the Play's the Thingie"	Peter Scolari	Ed Naha	December 11, 1999	306
Amy begs Wayne to direct a play to save a community theatre. He reluctantly agrees and finds people coming to his doorstep to try out. Meanwhile, two aliens come to the house to fix their spaceship. The aliens came here since they know Amy and the family. Some bad guys are after the aliens so the family is on the look out whilst also being in the play.
55	11	"Honey, He Ain't Rude, He's My Brother"	Scott McGinnis	Roger Reitzel	January 8, 2000	303
Wayne's brother Randy Rude the Science Dude comes to town with his show. He invites Wayne to help him get the ratings up. Wayne agrees to help but unknown to him, he started taking over. When he realizes this, he plans a way to pay back for all the times that he has taken over.
56	12	"Honey, You Won't Believe What Happens Next!"	Joey Travolta	Mark Fink	January 15, 2000	312
Wayne invents a pair of glasses to watch the solar eclipse with his family. Somehow he can see the future with the glasses. The rest of the family members are having trouble getting to the eclipse. Amy loses her note, the bus breaks down for Nick, and Diane is in a dog case. Wayne sees the future where his family is nearly killed. Can he save them in time?
57	13	"Honey, Situation Normal, All Szalinski'd Up"	Scott McGinnis	Kat Likkel	January 22, 2000	314
Amy wants to get into college, and Wayne wants to help impress the recruiter who's coming to dinner at the Szalinski house. Worried about being embarrassed by her family, Amy convinces Diane to talk to Wayne about acting normal during dinner. Diane talks to Wayne while he's working on the Psycho-Cybernetics Generator, a machine that makes one's thoughts happen in real life. Diane blurts out that she wishes they were a normal family just as she's zapped by the generator. The next day Diane becomes frozen in time and, lost inside her thought of a normal family, learns that normal can be boring. Worried that Diane might not know she's trapped in a dream, Wayne wires them both to the generator, which projects his thoughts into Diane's head. If Wayne can join Diane in her thought, he can help her get back to her very non-normal life.
58	14	"Honey, It's the Fixer-Uppers"	Adam Weissman	Ed Naha	January 29, 2000	313
Things go wrong when Wayne tries to fix the fridge as his hinge ruins the kitchen so now they have to clean the kitchen. Mishappenings just keep happening and as usual Jennings makes things worse. Can they get everything back in order before the family comes back? Amy, Diane, and Nick are at the zoo trying to save it. Amy, lets a journalist in against the zoo's wishes, because he was "cute" so now they must get the guy out.
59	15	"Honey, I'm on the Lam"	Francis Damberger	Story by : Ed Naha; Teleplay by : Peter Mohan	February 5, 2000	315
Amy writes a good story about her dad and his inventions. Two mobsters, including one that looks like Wayne, find Wayne and decides to switch, so they can get in the clear. They kidnapp Wayne and the bad guy goes into the house. After a while Wayne gets taped and tied at a hotel and Amy figures out what's going on. Will the bad guys get caught and will Wayne get home safely?
60	16	"Honey, I'm the Wrong Arm of the Law"	Scott McGinnis	Kat Likkel	February 12, 2000	316
Wayne makes police equipment for the Chief. Jake who is running to be chief for another two years is reluctant, and won't listen the rest of the family. The family are at a community service, serving meals where the people protest and the cook quits. Also, a jewel thief ties the family up. Wayne goes after Jack to warn him and save his family.
61	17	"Honey, It's an Interplanetary, Extraordinary Life"	Scott McGinnis	Kat Likkel	February 19, 2000	319
Diane is running to become partner in her law firm and she must host a dinner for a man and his wife. The time hopper is broken and Wayne is trying to repair it but it sends them through time and space during the dinner. Now the family and the couple must work together to get everything back to normal.
62	18	"Honey, I'm Spooked"	Terry Ingram	Ed Naha	February 26, 2000	318
Diane somehow comes into possessing a haunted trunk dating back to the 1800s. Strange things begin to happen, a cable bites Wayne, Nick turns into a plant, and Amy gets possessed. Now the family has to figure out how to get Nick back to normal and get rid of the spooky things that are happening. With the help of an expert, will they succeed?
63	19	"Honey, Like Father, Like Son"	Peter Scolari	Michael Franco & Patrick Towne	April 29, 2000	320
When a Canadian secret service recruits Wayne to capture a fiendish villain that Wayne once went to school with, plans to capture him go haywire, and Amy is dating his son. Amy finds out that her supposed boyfriend is using her to steal one of Wayne's inventions, she tries to stop him, but will Amy succeed? And, will Wayne and the Chief stop the bad guys?
64	20	"Honey, Growing Up Is Hard to Do"	Wilson Wong	Kat Likkel	May 6, 2000	321
Nick wants to appear on a show called Smart Mouth because he believes he knows everything. Everyone tells him that he is too young so Nick makes a chemical which accelerates his aging process, turning him into a grown man overnight. But his parents eventually create an antidote so now they must convince Nick to go back to normal or he will be a grown up forever.
65	21	"Honey, I Shrink, Therefore I Am"	Jonathan Hackett	Mahatma Kane Jeeves	May 13, 2000	322
The shrink ray is not working and it shrinks Amy, Jack, Wayne and Jake so now they must try to get back to their normal size again. Also, Diane has a big surprise for everyone at the end of the show. Note: This was the last produced episode of Honey, I Shrunk the Kids: The TV Show. Both St. Claire Entertainment and the Walt Disney Company announced that the series would end production after this episode.
66	22	"Honey, Whodunit?"	Peter Scolari	Story by : Roger Reitzel; Teleplay by : Ed Naha	May 20, 2000	317
Wayne writes a story in his lab about a detective who must solve a case that becomes extremely confusing. Some of the people look very familiar in his story.
