= Israel–Nicaragua relations =

- Nicaragua: Israel

Israel–Nicaragua relations refer to the bilateral relations between Israel and Nicaragua.

== History ==
Israel and Nicaragua established diplomatic relations on 18 May 1948. In 1957 the American I. Irving Davidson arranged for the purchase of 68 staghound tanks for Nicaragua from Israel. Between 1974 and 1978, Israel continue to sell arms to the Somoza family regime.

Following the 1979 Nicaraguan revolution, relations between the two countries deteriorated significantly and were severed in 1982 due to the First Lebanon War. Since then, Israel has attempted to restore relations with official Managua rather than supplying money and weapons to the anti-government rebels. Israel formally denied ties with the rebels and offered the Sandinista government various forms of assistance to restore relations. However, relations with the new government were cool, as the Sandinistas were closer to the Palestine Liberation Organization: they invited the organization to open an embassy in Managua in 1981 and welcomed Yasser Arafat, who visited Nicaragua. On 6 August 1982, because of the ongoing Lebanese Civil War and the siege of Beirut, Nicaragua severed diplomatic relations with Israel. Relations were restored only 10 years later.

On 1 June 2010, Nicaragua froze bilateral relations again. This time, according to Nicaraguan President Daniel Ortega, the conflict with the 2010 Gaza flotilla raid was the reason. Relations were restored in March 2017. On 29 March 2017, the Nicaraguan government announced the restoration of diplomatic relations with Israel, despite its continued support for Iran's policies (including providing its territory for training camps and supporting Iran in votes at the United Nations and other international organizations).

In 2012, Nicaraguan President Ortega hosted his Iranian counterpart, Mahmoud Ahmadinejad, at his residence. During a joint press conference, Ortega called on Israel to destroy its nuclear arsenal.

The restoration of diplomatic relations with Nicaragua is part of the Israeli Foreign Ministry's special program to restore ties with countries in the region. Priority is given to countries such as Cuba, Venezuela, and Bolivia.

In October 2024, Nicaragua once again severed diplomatic ties with Israel due to the Israeli war on Gaza and Lebanon, calling the Israeli government "fascist" and "genocidal".

== See also ==
- Foreign relations of Israel
- Foreign relations of Nicaragua
