= Brian Dennehy =

American actor (1938–2020)

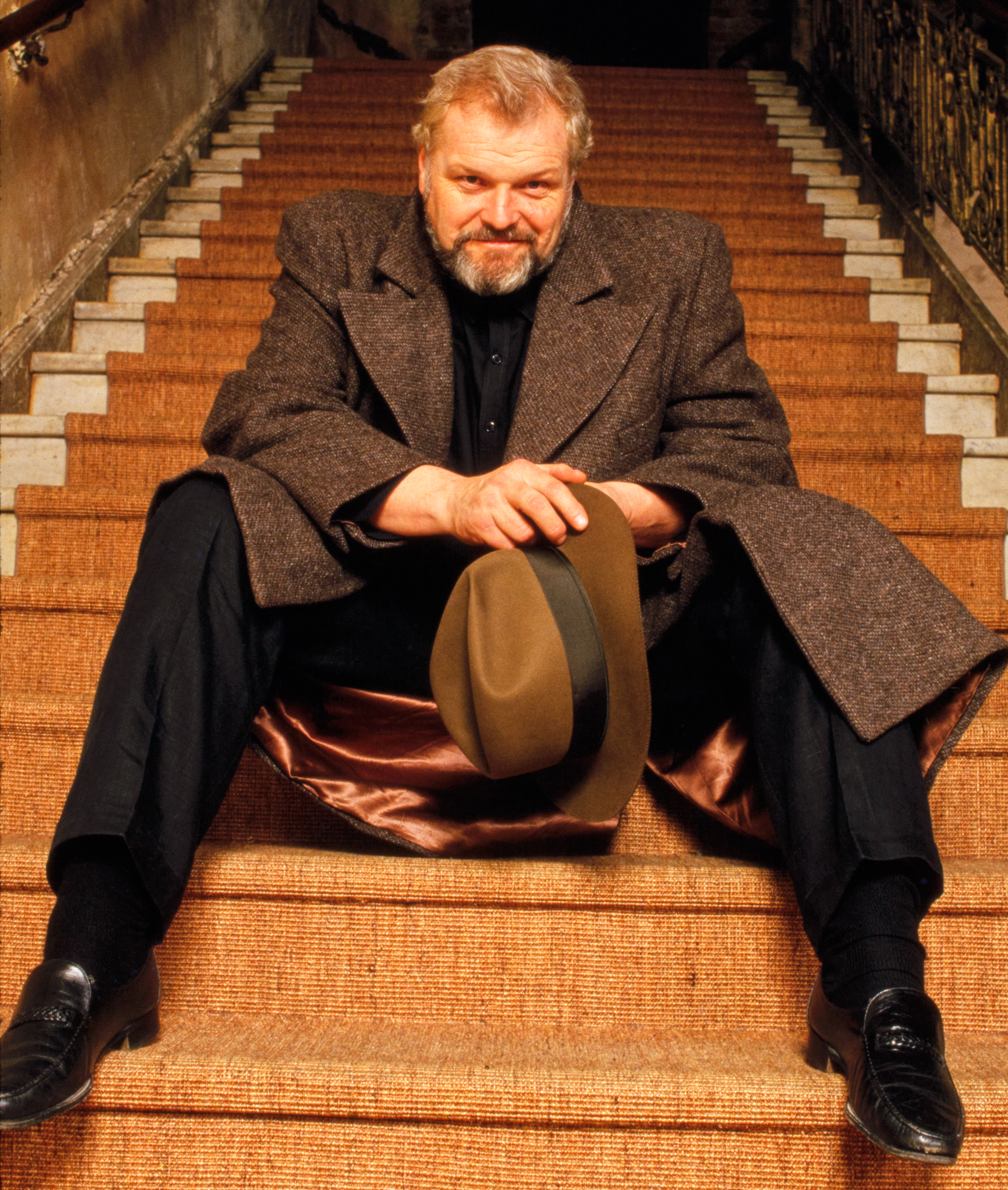
- Dennehy at the Majestic Theatre in 1988
- Born: Brian Manion Dennehy; July 9, 1938; Bridgeport, Connecticut, U.S.
- Died: April 15, 2020 (aged 81); New Haven, Connecticut, U.S.
- Education: Columbia University (BA)
- Occupation: Actor
- Years active: 1965–2020
- Spouses: Judith Scheff (m. 1959; div. 1987) Jennifer Arnott (m. 1988)
- Children: 5, including Elizabeth
- Military career
- Allegiance: United States
- Branch: United States Marine Corps
- Service years: 1958–1963

Brian Manion Dennehy (/ˈdɛnəhi/; July 9, 1938 – April 15, 2020) was an American actor. Renowned for his performances on stage and screen and once described as "perhaps the foremost living interpreter" of Eugene O'Neill's works, he received two Tony Awards, a Laurence Olivier Award, and a Golden Globe Award, in addition to nominations for six Primetime Emmy Awards and a Grammy Award.

He had a decades-long relationship with Chicago's Goodman Theatre where much of his O'Neill work originated. He also regularly played Canada's Stratford Festival, especially in works by William Shakespeare and Samuel Beckett. He once gave credit for his award-winning performances to the plays’ authors: "When you walk with giants, you learn how to take bigger steps." Dennehy was inducted into the American Theater Hall of Fame in 2010.

His screen roles included First Blood (1982), Gorky Park (1983), Silverado (1985), Cocoon (1985), F/X (1986), Presumed Innocent (1990), Tommy Boy (1995), Romeo + Juliet (1996), Ratatouille (2007), and Knight of Cups (2015). Dennehy won the Golden Globe Award for Best Actor – Miniseries or Television Film for his role as Willy Loman in the television film Death of a Salesman (2000).

== Early life and education ==
Brian Manion Dennehy was born on July 9, 1938, in Bridgeport, Connecticut, to Hannah (Manion), a nurse, and Edward Dennehy, a wire service editor for the Associated Press. He had two brothers, Michael and Edward. He was of Irish ancestry and was raised Catholic. The family relocated to Long Island, New York, where Dennehy attended Chaminade High School in the village of Mineola.

Dennehy entered Columbia University in New York City on a football scholarship in the fall of 1956, pausing his college education for five years to serve in the United States Marine Corps. He returned to Columbia in 1960 and graduated in 1965 with a B.A. in history. While acting in regional theater he supported his family by working blue-collar jobs including driving a taxi and bartending. He hated his brief stint as a stockbroker for Merrill Lynch in their Manhattan office in the mid-1970s. He later described how working odd hours allowed him to attend matinee theater performances that provided his acting education: "I never went to acting school—I was a truck driver and I used to go see everything I could see—Wednesday afternoons". (Note: Some sources say Dennehy attended or earned a degree at the Yale School of Drama. Nothing similar appears in Dennehy's New York Times obituary, and Yale publications that routinely identify graduates do not identify Dennehy that way. Nor is Yale mentioned in the interview published in Columbia College Today that discusses his early years at length. Dennehy once described the decade following his graduation from Columbia without mentioning Yale: "From 1965 to 1974 I served the best possible apprenticeship for an actor. I learned firsthand how a truck driver lives, what a bartender does, how a salesman thinks. I had to make a life inside those jobs, not just pretend".) In the 1970s, stage performances in New York led to television and film work.

=== Military service ===
Dennehy enlisted in the United States Marine Corps, serving from 1958 to 1963, including playing football on Okinawa. In several interviews, he described being wounded in combat and repeatedly claimed to have served in Vietnam.

In 1999, he apologized for misrepresenting his military record, stating: "I lied about serving in Vietnam, and I'm sorry. I did not mean to take away from the actions and the sacrifices of the ones who did really serve there... I did steal valor. That was very wrong of me. There is no real excuse for that."

== Acting career ==
=== Film ===
Dennehy was primarily known as a dramatic actor. His breakthrough role was as the overzealous sheriff Will Teasle in First Blood (1982) opposite Sylvester Stallone as John Rambo.

His earlier films included several comedies, like Semi-Tough (1977) with Burt Reynolds (in which he portrayed a pro football player), Foul Play (1978) with Chevy Chase, and 10 (1979) with Dudley Moore (as a Manzanillo bartender). He appeared in the 1983 thriller Gorky Park as William Kirwill opposite William Hurt and Lee Marvin. He later portrayed a corrupt sheriff in the western Silverado and an alien in Cocoon, both released in 1985.

Dennehy had memorable supporting parts in such films as Split Image (1982), Never Cry Wolf (1983), Legal Eagles (1986), Cocoon: The Return (1988), F/X: Murder By Illusion (1986), Presumed Innocent (1990), F/X2: The Deadly Art of Illusion (1991) and Prophet of Evil (1993).

Dennehy gradually became a valuable character actor but also achieved leading-man status in the thriller Best Seller (1987) co-starring James Woods. That same year, he also starred in the Peter Greenaway film The Belly of an Architect, for which he won the Best Actor Award at the 1987 Chicago International Film Festival. Commenting upon this unusual venture, Dennehy said, "I've been in a lot of movies but this is the first film I've made."

He went on to star as Harrison in the Australian film The Man from Snowy River II in 1988.

One of his most well-known roles came in the 1995 Chris Farley-David Spade comedy Tommy Boy as Big Tom Callahan. He also was reunited with his 10 co-star Bo Derek in Tommy Boy, in which she played his wife. The following year, he played Romeo's father in Romeo + Juliet.

Dennehy had a voice role in the 2007 animated movie Ratatouille as Django, father of the rat chef Remy. He appeared as the superior officer of Robert De Niro and Al Pacino in the 2008 cop drama Righteous Kill and as the father of Russell Crowe in the 2010 suspense film The Next Three Days.

Dennehy starred as Clarence Darrow in Alleged, a film based on the Scopes Monkey Trial, the famous court battle over the teaching of evolution in American public schools.

=== Television ===
Dennehy's early professional acting career included small guest roles in such 1970s and 1980s series as Kojak, M*A*S*H, Lou Grant, Dallas, Dynasty, and Hunter. He also appeared in an episode of Miami Vice during the 1987–88 season.

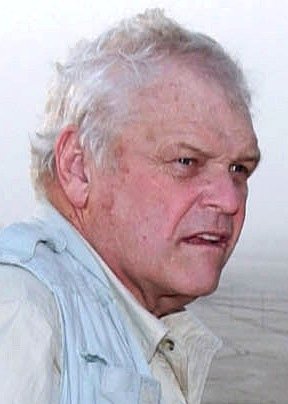
Dennehy in 2003

Dennehy portrayed Sergeant Ned T. "Frozen Chosen" Coleman in the television movie A Rumor of War (1980) opposite Brad Davis. He continued to appear in such high-profile television films as Skokie (1981), Split Image (1982), Day One (1989), and A Killing in a Small Town (1990) opposite Barbara Hershey. In 1983 he played government informant Edward Partin in Blood Feud about Jimmy Hoffa.He also played the title role in HBO's Teamster Boss: The Jackie Presser Story.

Dennehy had a lead role as fire chief/celebrity dad Leslie "Buddy" Krebs in the short-lived 1982 series Star of the Family. Despite his star power, that show was cancelled after a half-season. He starred in the crime drama Jack Reed TV movies.

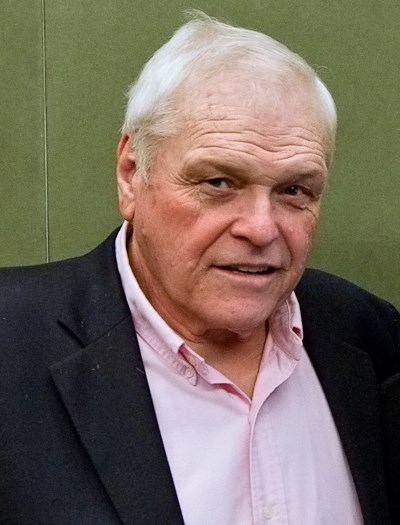
Dennehy in 2009

Dennehy was nominated for Emmy Awards six times for his television movies. In 1992, he was nominated for Outstanding Lead Actor in a Miniseries or TV Movie for his performance as John Wayne Gacy in To Catch a Killer, and he was nominated that same year in a different category, Outstanding Supporting Actor in a Miniseries or TV Movie, for The Burden of Proof. Dennehy's other Emmy nominations were for his work in A Killing in a Small Town, Murder in the Heartland (1993) and his work in the Showtime cable TV movie Our Fathers (2005), which was about the Roman Catholic Church sex abuse scandal. In 2000, Dennehy was nominated for an Emmy for Outstanding Lead Actor in a Miniseries or TV Movie for a television presentation for his performance as Willy Loman in Arthur Miller's Death of a Salesman which he had performed on Broadway. While not gaining the actor an Emmy win, the performance did, however, win him a Golden Globe Award. He also appeared as a recurring character in the NBC sitcom Just Shoot Me!.

A cartoon version of Dennehy appeared in the 1999 film South Park: Bigger, Longer & Uncut as well as in an episode of The Simpsons.

In January 2007, he starred in the episode "Scheherazade" of Law & Order: Special Victims Unit as a retired criminal who wants to reconnect with his daughter and admit his crimes before dying of a terminal disease thus eventually clearing a wrongfully imprisoned inmate. In April 2008, Dennehy guest-starred as a Teamster boss in "Sandwich Day", an episode of the TV series 30 Rock. He guest-starred in a 2009 episode of Rules of Engagement as the father of the main character, Jeff.

Dennehy starred as Elizabeth Keen's grandfather on the NBC series The Blacklist since the third season until his death from sepsis. He is replaced by actor Ron Raines during the show's eighth season.

In 2015 Dennehy co-starred in the Amazon Studios pilot Cocked with Jason Lee, Dreama Walker, Diora Baird, and Sam Trammell.

Dennehy also narrated many television programs including the Canadian-Irish docudrama Death or Canada.

=== Theater ===
Dennehy won two Tony Awards, both times for Best Lead Actor in a Play. His first win was for Death of a Salesman (for which he also won a Laurence Olivier Award for the production's London run), in 1999, and the second was for Eugene O'Neill's Long Day's Journey into Night in 2003. Both productions were directed by Robert Falls and were originally produced at the Goodman Theatre company in Chicago, Illinois. His acting in the "Salesman" was called "the performance of Dennehy's career".

On stage, Dennehy frequently performed in the Chicago theater world, and made his Broadway debut in 1995 in Brian Friel's Translations. In 1999, he was the first male performer to be voted the Sarah Siddons Award for his work in Chicago theater. He made a return to Broadway in 2007 as Matthew Harrison Brady in Inherit the Wind opposite Christopher Plummer, then returned again opposite Carla Gugino in a 2009 revival of Eugene O'Neill's Desire Under the Elms.

In fall 1992, he played the lead role of Hickey in Robert Falls's production of Eugene O'Neill's The Iceman Cometh at the Abbey Theatre in Dublin.

In 2008, Dennehy appeared at the Stratford Shakespeare Festival, in Stratford, Ontario, appearing in All's Well That Ends Well as the King of France, and a double bill of plays, Samuel Beckett's Krapp's Last Tape and Eugene O'Neill's Hughie, where Dennehy reprised the role of Erie Smith. In 2010, he was inducted into the American Theatre Hall of Fame. In December 2010, he returned to Ireland to play Bull McCabe in the Olympia Theatre of Dublin's stage version of John B. Keane's The Field.

In 2011, Dennehy returned to the Stratford Shakespeare Festival in the role of Sir Toby Belch in Shakespeare's Twelfth Night. He also played Max in Harold Pinter's The Homecoming, the first Pinter work to be produced there.

In April through June 2012, he played the role of Larry Slade in the Eugene O'Neill play The Iceman Cometh at the Goodman Theatre in Chicago, which he reprised in 2015 when the production, with most of the Goodman Theater production cast, was revived at the BAM Harvey Theater in Brooklyn, New York, New York.

== Personal life and death ==
Dennehy married for the first time while in the Marines in 1959. Before he finished college, he and his first wife had three daughters. Two of them became actresses; one is Elizabeth Dennehy. After his marriage ended in divorce in 1987, he married Jennifer Arnott, an Australian, in 1988. They had two children, a boy and a girl.

He died on April 15, 2020, of cardiac arrest due to sepsis, in New Haven, Connecticut.

== Acting credits ==
=== Film ===
Year	Title	Role	Notes
1977	Looking for Mr. Goodbar	Surgeon	
1977	Semi-Tough	T.J. Lambert	
1978	F.I.S.T.	Frank Vasko	
1978	Foul Play	Inspector "Fergie" Ferguson	
1979	Butch and Sundance: The Early Days	O.C. Hanks	
1979	10	Don, The Bartender	
1980	Little Miss Marker	Herbie	
1982	Split Image	Kevin Stetson	
1982	First Blood	Sheriff Will Teasle	
1983	Never Cry Wolf	Rosie Little	
1983	Gorky Park	William Kirwill	
1984	Finders Keepers	Mayor Frizzoli	
1984	The River Rat	"Doc" Cole	
1985	Cocoon	Walter	
1985	Silverado	Sheriff Cobb	
1985	Twice in a Lifetime	Nick	
1986	F/X	Leo McCarthy	
1986	The Check Is in the Mail	Richard Jackson	
1986	Legal Eagles	C.J. Cavanaugh	
1987	The Belly of an Architect	Stourley Kracklite	
1987	Best Seller	Lieutenant Dennis Meechum	
1988	The Man from Snowy River II	Harrison	
1988	Miles from Home	Frank Roberts Sr.	
1988	Cocoon: The Return	Walter	Uncredited role
1989	Indio	Whytaker	
1989	Seven Minutes	Wagner	
1990	Blue Heat	Detective Lieutenant Frank Daly	aka The Last of the Finest
1990	Presumed Innocent	Raymond Horgan	
1991	F/X2	Leo McCarthy	
1992	Gladiator	Jimmy Horn	
1995	Tommy Boy	Tom "Big Tom" Callahan II	
1995	The Stars Fell on Henrietta	Dave "Big Dave" McDermot	
1996	Romeo + Juliet	Ted Montague	
1999	Out of the Cold	David Bards	
1999	Silicon Towers	Tom Warner	
2000	Dish Dogs	Frost	
2001	Summer Catch	John Schiffner	
2002	Stolen Summer	Father Kelly	
2002	Code Yellow: Hospital at Ground Zero	The Narrator	
2002	Drawing First Blood	Himself	Short
2004	She Hate Me	Chairman Billy Church	
2005	Assault on Precinct 13	Officer Jasper O'Shea	
2005	Tommy Boy: Behind the Laughter	Himself	Short
2005	10th and Wolf	FBI Agent Horvath	
2006	Everyone's Hero	Babe Ruth	Voice
2006	The Ultimate Gift	Gus Caldwell	
2007	Ratatouille	Django	Voice
2007	Welcome to Paradise	Bobby Brown	
2007	War Eagle, Arkansas	Pop	
2008	Cat City	Harold Vogessor	
2008	Righteous Kill	Lieutenant J.D. Hingus	
2010	Every Day	Ernie Freed	
2010	Meet Monica Velour	"Pop Pop"	
2010	The Next Three Days	George Brennan	
2010	Alleged	Clarence Darrow	
2011	The Big Year	Raymond Harris	
2012	Twelfth Night	Sir Toby Belch	
2015	Knight of Cups	Joseph	
2018	The Seagull	Sorin Arkadin	
2018	Tag	Mr. Cilliano, Randy's Father	Uncredited
2018	The Song of Sway Lake	Hal Sway	
2019	Driveways	Del	
2019	Master Maggie	Himself	Short
2019	3 Days with Dad	Bob Mills	
2020	Son of the South	J.O. Zellner	Posthumous release
TBA	Long Day Journey	TBA	Post-production, Posthumous release; Final film role

=== Television films ===
Year	Title	Role	Notes
1977	Bumpers	Ernie Stapp	
1977	Johnny, We Hardly Knew Ye	Longshoreman	
1977	It Happened at Lakewood Manor	Fire Chief	
1978	A Real American Hero	Buford Pusser	
1978	Ruby and Oswald	George Paulsen	
1978	A Death in Canaan	Barney Parsons	
1979	Dummy	Ragoti	
1979	The Jericho Mile	Dr. D	
1979	Silent Victory: The Kitty O'Neil Story	Mr. O'Neil	
1980	A Rumor of War	Sergeant Ned Coleman	Miniseries
1980	The Seduction of Miss Leona	Bliss Dawson	
1981	Skokie	Chief Arthur Buchanan	
1981	Fly Away Home	Tim Arnold	
1983	I Take These Men	Phil Zakarian	
1983	Blood Feud	Edward Grady Partin	
1984	Off Sides (Pigs vs. Freaks)	Sergeant Cheever	
1986	Acceptable Risks	Don Sheppard	
1987	The Lion of Africa	Sam Marsh	
1988	A Father's Revenge	Paul Hobart	
1989	Day One	General Leslie Groves	
1989	Perfect Witness	James Falcon	
1990	A Killing in a Small Town	Ed Reivers	
1990	Rising Son	Gus Robinson	
1990	Pride and Extreme Prejudice	Bruno Morenz	
1991	In Broad Daylight	Len Rowan	
1992	The Diamond Fleece	Lieutenant Merritt Outlaw	
1992	Teamster Boss: The Jackie Presser Story	Jackie Presser	
1992	To Catch a Killer	John Wayne Gacy	
1992	The Burden of Proof	Dixon Hartnell	Miniseries
1992	Deadly Matrimony	Sergeant Jack Reed	
1993	Foreign Affairs	Chuck Mumpson	
1993	Prophet of Evil: The Ervil LeBaron Story	Ervil LeBaron	Film [Hearst Entertainment INC]
1993	Final Appeal	Perry Sundquist	
1993	Jack Reed: Badge of Honor	Sergeant Jack Reed	
1993	Murder in the Heartland	John McCarthur	Miniseries
1994	Leave of Absence	Sam	
1994	Midnight Movie	James Boyce	
1994	Jack Reed: A Search for Justice	Sergeant Jack Reed	
1995	Jack Reed: One of Our Own	Sergeant Jack Reed	
1995	Shadow of a Doubt	Charlie Sloan	
1996	Jack Reed: A Killer Among Us	Sergeant Jack Reed	
1996	Jack Reed: Death and Vengeance	Sergeant Jack Reed	
1996	A Season in Purgatory	Gerald Bradley	
1996	Undue Influence	Paul Madriani	
1997	Indefensible: The Truth About Edward Brannigan	Eddie Brannigan	
1998	Voyage of Terror	U.S. President	
1998	Thanks of a Grateful Nation	Senator Riegle	
1999	Netforce	Lowell Davidson	
1999	Sirens	Lieutenant Denby	
1999	Too Rich: The Secret Life of Doris Duke	Louis Bromfield	
2000	Fail Safe	General Bogan	
2000	Death of a Salesman	Willy Loman	
2001	Warden of Red Rock	Sheriff Church	
2001	Three Blind Mice	Matthew Hope	
2002	A Season on the Brink	Bobby Knight	
2003	The Crooked E: The Unshredded Truth About Enron	Mr. Blue	
2003	The Roman Spring of Mrs. Stone	Tom Stone	
2004	Category 6: Day of Destruction	Andy Goodman	Miniseries
2005	Our Fathers	Father Dominic Spagnolia	
2005	The Exonerated	Gary Gauger	
2007	Marco Polo	Kublai Khan	
2013	The Challenger Disaster	Chairman William Rogers	
2015	The Ultimate Legacy	Gus Caldwell	Hallmark movie
2017	A Very Merry Toy Store	Joe Haggarty	

=== Television series ===
Year	Title	Role	Notes
1977	Kojak	Peter Connor	Episode: "The Godson"
1977	Serpico	Jody	Episode: "Sanctuary"
1977	Lanigan's Rabbi	Burton Tree	Episode: "Corpse of the Year"
1977	Police Woman	Burrows	Episode: "Shadow of Doubt"
1977	Lou Grant	Wilson	Episode: "Nazi"
1977	M*A*S*H	M.P. Sergeant Ernie Connors	Episode: "Souvenirs"
1977	Lucan	Fisher	Episode: "Listen to the Heart Beat"
1977	The Fitzpatricks	Coach Hatfield	Episode: "Superman"
1978	Pearl	Sergeant Otto Chain	3 episodes
1978	Dallas	Luther Frick	Episode: "Winds of Vengeance"
1978	The Tony Randall Show	Brian Sr.	Episode: "Bobby and Brian"
1979	Big Shamus, Little Shamus	Arnie Sutter	2 episodes
1979	Knots Landing	James Cargill	Episode: "Chance of a Lifetime"
1981	Dynasty	District Attorney Jake Dunham	5 episodes
1981	Darkroom	Roland	Episode: "Make-Up"
1982	Star of the Family	Leslie Krebs	10 episodes
1984	Cagney & Lacey	Michael MacGruder	Episode: "The Bounty Hunter"
1984	Hunter	Dr. Bolin	Episode: "Hunter"
1985	Evergreen	Matthew Malone	3 episodes
1985	The Last Place on Earth	Frederick Cook	2 episodes
1985	Tall Tales & Legends	Buffalo Bill	Episode: "Annie Oakley"
1987	Miami Vice	Reverend Billy Bob Proverb	Episode: "Amen...Send Money"
1987	Faerie Tale Theatre	King Neptune (Narrator)	Voice, Episode: "The Little Mermaid"
1994	Birdland	Dr. Brian McKenzie	4 episodes
1996	Dead Man's Walk	Major Chvallie	2 episodes
1996	Nostromo	Joshua C. Holyrod	4 episodes
1998–2003	Just Shoot Me!	'Red' Finch	4 episodes
2001	The Fighting Fitzgeralds	Fitzgerald	10 episodes
2005	The West Wing	Senator Rafe Framhagen	Episode: "Ninety Miles Away"
2006	The 4400	Mitch Baldwin	Episode: "Blink"
2007	Law & Order: Special Victims Unit	Judson Tierney	Episode: "Scheherezade"
2007	Masters of Science Fiction	Bedzyk	Episode: "The Discarded"
2008	30 Rock	Mickey J.	Episode: "Sandwich Day"
2009	Rules of Engagement	Roy	Episode: "Dad's Visit"
2010	Rizzoli & Isles	Detective Kenny Leahy	Episode: "Boston Strangler Redux"
2012	The Good Wife	'Bucky' Stabler	2 episodes
2013	The Big C	Mr. Tolkey	Episode: "The Finale"
2015	Public Morals	Joe Patton	8 episodes
2016–2020	The Blacklist	Dominic Wilkinson	9 episodes (dedicated to Dennehy's memory in his 9th episode)
2017	Hap and Leonard	Sheriff Valentine Otis	6 episodes
2020	Penny Dreadful: City of Angels	Jerome Townsend	Episode: "Sing, Sing, Sing" (dedicated to Dennehy's memory)

=== Video games ===
Year	Title	Role
2007	Ratatouille	Django
2012	Rush: A Disney-Pixar Adventure	Django

== Awards and nominations ==
Year	Award	Category	Work	Result	Ref.
1993	American Television Awards	Best Actor in a Miniseries	To Catch a Killer	Won	
2020	Boston Society of Film Critics Awards	Best Supporting Actor	Driveways	Runner-up	
1991	CableACE Awards	Actor in a Movie or Miniseries	Perfect Witness	Nominated	
1994	CableACE Awards	Actor in a Movie or Miniseries	Foreign Affairs	Won	
2020	Chlotrudis Awards	Best Supporting Actor	Driveways	Nominated	
1999	Drama Desk Awards	Outstanding Actor in a Play	Death of a Salesman	Won	
2003	Drama Desk Awards	Outstanding Actor in a Play	Long Day's Journey into Night	Nominated	
1996	Edgar Allan Poe Awards	Best Television Feature of Miniseries	Shadow of a Doubt	Nominated	
2020	Florida Film Critics Circle Awards	Best Supporting Actor	Driveways	Runner-up	
2000	Golden Globe Awards	Best Actor – Miniseries or Television Film	Death of a Salesman	Won	
2000	Grammy Awards	Best Spoken Word Album	The Complete Shakespeare Sonnets	Nominated	
2020	Greater Western New York Film Critics Association Awards	Best Supporting Actor	Driveways	Nominated	
2002	Online Film & Television Association Awards	Best Supporting Actor in a Motion Picture or Miniseries	The Roman Spring of Mrs. Stone	Nominated	
1990	Primetime Emmy Awards	Outstanding Supporting Actor in a Limited or Anthology Series or Movie	A Killing in a Small Town	Nominated	
1992	Primetime Emmy Awards	Outstanding Lead Actor in a Limited or Anthology Series or Movie	To Catch a Killer	Nominated	
1992	Primetime Emmy Awards	Outstanding Supporting Actor in a Limited or Anthology Series or Movie	The Burden of Proof	Nominated	
1993	Primetime Emmy Awards	Outstanding Supporting Actor in a Limited or Anthology Series or Movie	Murder in the Heartland	Nominated	
2000	Primetime Emmy Awards	Outstanding Lead Actor in a Limited or Anthology Series or Movie	Death of a Salesman	Nominated	
2005	Primetime Emmy Awards	Outstanding Supporting Actor in a Limited or Anthology Series or Movie	Our Fathers	Nominated	
2020	Producers Guild of America Awards	David L. Wolper Award for Outstanding Producer of Long-Form Television	Death of a Salesman	Won	
2020	San Diego Film Critics Society Awards	Best Actor	Driveways	Nominated	
1996	Satellite Awards	Best Actor in a Supporting Role in a Mini-Series or Motion Picture Made for Television	A Season in Purgatory	Nominated	
1998	Satellite Awards	Best Actor in a Supporting Role in a Mini-Series or Motion Picture Made for Television	Thanks of a Grateful Nation	Nominated	
2005	Satellite Awards	Best Actor in a Supporting Role in a Mini-Series or Motion Picture Made for Television	Our Fathers	Nominated	
2020	Satellite Awards	Best Actor in a Supporting Role – Motion Picture	Driveways	Nominated	
2000	Actor Awards	Outstanding Performance by a Male Actor in a Miniseries or Television Movie	Death of a Salesman	Won	
2020	Sochi International Film Festival	Best Actor	Driveways	Won	
1999	Tony Awards	Best Leading Actor in a Play	Death of a Salesman	Won	
2003	Tony Awards	Best Leading Actor in a Play	Long Day's Journey into Night	Won	

== See also ==
- List of Golden Globe winners
- List of Primetime Emmy Award winners
