= Shadow of a Doubt (1995 film) =

- Genre: Crime; Drama
- Based on: Shadow of a Doubt by William J. Coughlin
- Teleplay by: Brian Dennehy; Bill Phillips
- Directed by: Brian Dennehy
- Starring: Brian Dennehy; Bonnie Bedelia; Fairuza Balk
- Theme music composer: Jane Ira Bloom
- Country of origin: United States
- Original language: English

Production
- Executive producers: Michele Brustin; Brian Dennehy; David Percelay; Richard Brams
- Producer: Richard Brams
- Production location: British Columbia
- Cinematography: Neil Roach
- Editor: Douglas Ibold
- Running time: 92 minutes
- Production companies: Hallmark Entertainment; Michele Brustin Productions; Scripps Howard Entertainment

Original release
- Network: NBC
- Release: December 3, 1995

Shadow of a Doubt is a 1995 American crime drama TV movie that was written and directed by its star Brian Dennehy. It was based on a novel by William J. Coughlin. The movie aired on NBC in the United States on December 3, 1995.

== Plot ==
Charley Sloan, a once-spectacular attorney and now recovering alcoholic is swept into the public spotlight when Robin Harwell, a woman he once loved, hires him to defend her stepdaughter Angel Harwell, who stands accused of murdering her millionaire father.

Despite mounting accusations that question his competence and frenzied opposition by a politically ambitious prosecutor, Charley is reluctantly drawn into defending Angel in a high-profile trial that quickly becomes a media circus. As the courtroom tension escalates, Charley discovers he is as much on trial as his client.

Driven by a desperate need to redeem himself, Charley descends into a shadowy world of murder and money, illusion and deceit. Against tremendous odds, Charley must find a way to prove to the jury that Angel might be innocent and to create in their minds a small but crucial shadow of a doubt.

== Cast ==
- Brian Dennehy as Charley Sloane
- Bonnie Bedelia as Robin Harwell
- Fairuza Balk as Angel Harwell
- Mike Nussbaum as Nate Golden
- Kevin Dunn as Mark Evola
- Joe Grifasi as Sidney Sherman
- Michael MacRae as Walter Figer (as Michael Macrae)
- Ken Pogue as Judge Brown
- Donnelly Rhodes as Williams
- Brent Jennings as Little Mike
- Bruce McGill as Dr. Fred Williams
- Mavor Moore as Max Webster
- Henry Beckman as Judge Mulhern
- Don S. Davis as Kevin Carroll Sr.

== Reception ==
Andy Webb of The Movie Scene awarded the film 3 out of 5 stars, saying that Shadow of a Doubt "ends up entertaining but in a bit of a bad movie way due to the over the top performances and a variety of forced scenes." Nevertheless, he recommended it to fans of Brian Dennehy.

Carole Horst of Variety wrote, "Dennehy turns in a fine perf as Charlie, and is believable as a recovering alcoholic, but Balk, batting her huge eyes and coming off like a mini Lana Turner with her platinum hair, is the telepic's saving grace as she both seduces the audience and turns on the innocent charm when it's necessary. Bedelia is almost silly as the hardened femme fatale widow, with her '40s hairdos and clipped line delivery."
