= Blood Feud (1983 film) =

- Promotional image
- Screenplay by: Robert Boris
- Directed by: Mike Newell
- Starring: Robert Blake; Cotter Smith
- Theme music composer: Fred Steiner
- Country of origin: United States
- Original language: English

Production
- Producers: Joel Glickman; Daniel Selznick
- Production locations: 20th Century Fox Studios - 10201 Pico Blvd., Century City, Los Angeles, California
- Editor: John Farrell
- Running time: 210 minutes
- Production company: 20th Century Fox Television

Original release
- Network: Syndication
- Release: April 25 – May 2, 1983

Blood Feud is a 1983 American two-part, four-hour made-for-television crime drama film centering on the conflict between Jimmy Hoffa and Robert F. Kennedy in an 11-year span from 1957 until Kennedy's assassination in 1968. The 210-minute film was directed by Mike Newell and written by Robert Boris. It stars Robert Blake as Hoffa and Cotter Smith as Kennedy with Danny Aiello and Brian Dennehy in supporting roles as union associates of Hoffa's.

The television film was distributed by Operation Prime Time, a syndicated block of television programming offered to mostly American independent stations. It is partially based on the 1965 book Tentacles of Power: The Story of Jimmy Hoffa by Clark R. Mollenhoff.

Blake was nominated for an Emmy and Golden Globe for Best Actor for his performance as Hoffa.

== Plot ==
It is the mid-1950s. A young Robert F. Kennedy is beginning to make a name for himself in Washington, D.C., as is his older brother, John F. Kennedy, a United States senator from Massachusetts.

Also on the rise is James R. Hoffa, an intensely dedicated member of the International Brotherhood of Teamsters union whose ambition is to become a force in the American labor movement. Jimmy Hoffa makes an attempt to ingratiate himself with Bobby Kennedy the first time they meet, but Kennedy is investigating corruption in labor and is already suspicious of Hoffa's possible ties to organized crime.

Kennedy exacts a promise from his brother to be part of a Senate committee investigating crime syndicates and their illegal ties to union executives and pension funds. FBI director J. Edgar Hoover is unwilling to focus on organized crime, or even acknowledge that such a thing exists.

After JFK is elected President of the United States in 1960, he appoints Bobby to be his Attorney General. Hoffa, already feeling persecuted by the younger Kennedy, begins to feel the pressure even more. Longtime associates such as Edward Grady Partin and Randy Powers can see how Hoffa's bitter feud with Bobby Kennedy is affecting him, but they stand by loyally as Hoffa becomes the president of the Teamsters, his power growing by the day.

Hoffa is acquitted by juries several times after investigations led by Kennedy and his right-hand man, Phil Wharton, result in charges against him. He gloats about his victories and publicly taunts Bobby in committee hearings, in the press, even in a courtroom while attorney Edward Bennett Williams portrays Kennedy as a millionaire with no regard for "the working man."

The assassination of JFK on November 22, 1963, is a horror to most Americans, but not to Hoffa, who acts as if nothing matters to him other than union business. The new president, Lyndon B. Johnson, surprises and disappoints Hoffa by retaining Bobby Kennedy as his attorney general.

Hoffa's paranoia grows. He is obsessed with finding informers within his organization and listening devices in his office. After one of his loyal allies, Partin, betrays him with federal authorities and testifies against him, Hoffa is convicted in 1964 of attempting to bribe a grand juror. He later is found guilty of misuse of a union pension fund. Appeals allow Hoffa to postpone incarceration for several years while Bobby Kennedy leaves LBJ's administration to become a U.S. senator representing New York.

Hoffa alternately implores Kennedy for mercy and threatens him with vengeance. He begins his sentence behind bars in 1967. The personal animus between the two men ends with Bobby's assassination in Los Angeles in 1968. Hoffa is granted an early release in 1971 after an arrangement with Richard Nixon results in a pardon, but he is unable to regain his Teamsters presidency upon being released. He mysteriously disappears in 1975, never to be seen again.

== Cast ==
- Robert Blake as James R. Hoffa
- Cotter Smith as Robert F. Kennedy
- Sam Groom as John F. Kennedy
- Forrest Tucker as Lyndon Baines Johnson
- Ernest Borgnine as J. Edgar Hoover
- Danny Aiello as Randy Powers
- Brian Dennehy as Edward Partin
- Edward Albert as Phil Wharton
- Jose Ferrer as Edward Bennett Williams
- Lance Henriksen as Mel Pierce
- Michael Lerner as Eddie Cheyfitz
- Seymour Cassel as Frank Kierdoff
- Vito Scotti as Vince Bocca
- Jim Haynie as Ned Tuckmill
- Robert Costanzo as Rocky
- Jack Thibeau as Stanton
- Biff Yeager as Teamster
- J. T. Walsh as Photographer
- Douglas Dirkson as Clark Mollenhoff

== Reception ==
=== Critical response ===
When the film was first aired, The New York Times television reporter, John Corry lauded Robert Blake's acting, writing "Mr. Blake's Hoffa is infinitely more interesting than Mr. Smith's Kennedy. This Hoffa loves the Teamsters; whatever his sins, he really did get his head busted on picket lines. Mr. Blake, hair slicked back, squinting, oozing muscular energy, is, if not a charismatic figure, at least a commanding one. When he's angry, you know he's angry. He seethes...When Blood Feud does rise to drama, it's almost always Mr. Blake's doing. When Hoffa's world comes crashing down, Mr. Blake thrashes like a spent, hooked fish, a large one. When he tries to make a deal with Kennedy, there's authentic desperation. His Hoffa has all the passion. He's the only participant in the feud."

=== Awards ===
Wins

- Writers Guild of America Award: WGA Award (TV), Original/Adapted Multi-Part Long Form Series, Robert Boris, For part II; 1984.

Nominations

- Emmy Award: Outstanding Lead Actor in a Limited Series or a Special, Robert Blake; 1983.
- Golden Globe Award: Best Performance by an Actor in a Mini-Series or Motion Picture Made for TV, Robert Blake; 1984.

== See also ==
- Robert F. Kennedy in media
