= Edward Partin =

American business agent

Edward Grady Partin Sr.
- Born: February 27, 1924; Woodville, Mississippi, US
- Died: March 11, 1990 (aged 66); Baton Rouge, Louisiana, US
- Resting place: Resthaven Gardens of Memory in Baton Rouge
- Occupation: Teamsters business agent
- Political party: Democrat
- Spouse: Divorced twice
- Children: 7

Edward Grady Partin Sr. (February 27, 1924 – March 11, 1990), was an American business agent for the Teamsters Union, and is best known for his 1964 testimony against Jimmy Hoffa, which was the primary evidence that allowed Robert F. Kennedy to convict Hoffa of jury tampering in 1964.

== Biography ==
Partin was born in Woodville, Mississippi. He joined the United States Marine Corps but received a bad conduct discharge after losing his temper and striking an officer.

He was the business manager of the five local IBT branches in Baton Rouge for 30 years. In 1961, he was charged by the union with embezzlement as union money was stolen from a safe. Two key witnesses in the grand jury died. He was indicted on June 27, 1962, for 26 counts of embezzlement and falsification and released on bail.

On August 14, 1962, Partin was sued for his role in a traffic accident injuring two passengers and killing a third. He was also indicted for first-degree manslaughter and leaving the scene of an accident. He also surrendered himself for aggravated kidnapping.

Partin was secretary-treasurer of Local 5 in Baton Rouge.

In June 1969 Partin was indicted by a grand jury on five counts of conspiracy and extortion, with bond set at $25,000. On 2 March 1972 he was found guilty of four of the charges, however later that month the verdict was set aside after his defense team filed for a mistrial or for the verdict to be set aside on the grounds that hearsay evidence had been introduced during the proceedings. He was eventually convicted on the third try in February 1973.

He was convicted of conspiracy to obstruct justice through witness tampering and perjury in March 1979. Partin pled no contest to numerous other corruption charges in the union, including embezzlement, and was released to a halfway house in 1986. Partin was paid a Teamsters salary for a period while in prison, until he was formally removed from office in 1981.

=== Testimony against Hoffa ===
Partin was recruited by the government as an informant following his arrest on charges of kidnapping children and manslaughter. He was also facing 26 counts of embezzlement and falsification of union records at the time. He struck a deal that he would inform on Jimmy Hoffa during his Nashville trial and report what he said. Not long after the children of a Teamster official he had kidnapped showed up at a courthouse one night and Partin was released on a $5000 bail. Hoffa was very pleased when Partin arrived in Nashville to accompany him during the trial proceedings, introducing Partin to his lawyer Frank Ragano as a "good friend of mine".

Hoffa began to suspect that one of his associates was an informer for the federal government. One figure he suspected was Partin. On 7 November 1963 Hoffa ally Dusty Miller called and made an appointment to see Walter Sheridan, aide to Attorney General Robert F. Kennedy. Towards the end of their meeting Miller brought up Partin and questioned why he hadn't been prosecuted yet despite his indictment. Sheridan recalls that, "He had been trying to feel us out about Partin...we had passed the test....we felt it was likely that they were checking out different people".

In 1963 Hoffa was arrested for attempted jury tampering in attempted bribery of a grand juror of a previous 1962 case in Nashville involving payments from a trucking company. Partin testified that he was offered $20,000 to rig the jury in Hoffa's favor. The testimony was the primary evidence of the Justice Department that led to Hoffa being sentenced to eight years in prison. Hoffa was surprised and reportedly unnerved when Partin took to the stand, "My God, it's Partin" he said.

In 1966 New Orleans District Attorney, Jim Garrison, who believed there was a conspiracy involved in the assassination of John F. Kennedy, began his own investigation into the assassination. On 23 June 1967 Garrison told WJBO that "We know that Jack Ruby and Lee Harvey Oswald were here in New Orleans several times....there was a third man driving them and we are checking the possibility it was Partin". There was talk that Garrison intended to subpoena Partin. Partin later told the journalist Dan E. Moldea that as Hoffa was appealing the verdict in his bribery trial, Garrison was investigating him. He stated to Moldea that Hoffa's lawyer, Frank Ragano, called him and informed him that he could get Garrison to back off if he signed an affidavit recanting his testimony. Partin refused. Ultimately, Partin was never subpoenaed nor indicted by Garrison.

=== Cuba ===
In the 1970s Partin told the journalist Dan E. Moldea that Hoffa, Bill Presser, and I. Irving Davidson "bought a bunch of arms and were selling them to anyone who wanted them in Cuba. They bought some planes from the army surplus, and they were ferrying these weapons and planes from Florida to Cuba". However Davidson denied this, although he admitted he sold "a tremendous amount of tanks and whatnot to Batista in 1959" and that just before Batista fell he "delivered a big package" to the Cuban dictator. Partin stated "I was right up there on several occasions when they were loading the guns and ammunition up on the barges".

The Senate Subcommittee on Internal Security had wanted to question Partin about allegations that he had trafficked arms to Castro but chairman of the committee Senator Thomas Dodd agreed to drop its investigation at the request of Robert F. Kennedy, who considered Partin too valuable a witness against Hoffa. Under cross-examination by Hoffa's defense team during his jury tampering trial, Hoffa's lawyers had attempted to introduce evidence that Partin had "committed treason by trafficking in arms with Fidel Castro", although the presiding judge ruled it inadmissible.

=== Assassination plot against Bobby Kennedy ===
In September 1962 Partin told the authorities that Hoffa had discussed with him an assassination plot against Attorney General Robert F. Kennedy. According to Partin, he travelled to Washington to see Hoffa at the Teamsters headquarters and while in his office he asked Partin if he knew anything about plastic explosives. Partin quoted Hoffa as asserting "I've got to do something about that son of a bitch Bobby Kennedy. He's got to go". The plan he said they discussed was to throw a plastic bomb at his car or at his house in Virginia. Partin underwent an FBI-administered polygraph test two days later, which he passed. President John F. Kennedy was made aware and fed the story to Ben Bradlee of Newsweek, however it was never published. When the allegation was released to the public in 1964, Hoffa called it "nonsense", stating "I may not like him very much, but I certainly would not plot to kill him."

After the assassination of President John F. Kennedy in November 1963, Partin's allegation received renewed attention. In the days after the assassination, Bobby Kennedy and White House Chief of Staff Kenneth O'Donnell made contact with associates to discuss the possibility of Teamsters or organized crime involvement. Charles Shaffer, an attorney in the Justice Department, was arranged to be appointed to the staff of the Warren Commission so that the possibility of Teamsters involvement could be watched.

In the latter half of the 1970s the House Select Committee on Assassinations was set up to re-investigate Kennedy's assassination. Partin was interviewed by committee staff on 20 July 1978. He told them the same thing as he had said to the FBI in 1962. Partin believed that Hoffa had approached him because of his belief that Partin was close to figures in the New Orleans crime family. The Committee concluded with regard to the Bobby Kennedy plot that it was real, but added that it "did not uncover evidence that the proposed Hoffa assassination plan ever went beyond its discussion". In the end, with regard to the assassination of President Kennedy, the committee "uncovered no direct evidence that Hoffa was involved in a plot" and expressed that it "strongly doubted" that Hoffa was involved in any such plot to kill President Kennedy.

== Later life ==
In March 1990 Partin died aged 66 in a nursing home in Baton Rouge. He suffered from heart disease and diabetes.

Partin is portrayed by actor Brian Dennehy in the 1983 television film Blood Feud, Ben Fuhrman in the 1985 miniseries Robert Kennedy and His Times, and Craig Vincent in Martin Scorsese's film The Irishman (2019).

== See also ==
- J. Minos Simon, a Partin attorney
- Blood Feud (1983 film)
