= Self Defense (1983 film) =

- Directed by: Paul Donovan; Maura O'Connell
- Screenplay by: Paul Donovan
- Story by: Marc Vautour
- Produced by: Michael Donovan; John Walsch; Maura O'Connell; Paul Donovan
- Starring: Doug Lennox; Tom Nardini; Brenda Bazinet; Darel Haeny; Terry-David Despres; Jack Blum; Keith Knight
- Cinematography: Les Krizsan
- Edited by: Ian McBride
- Music by: Peter Jermyn; Drew King
- Production company: Salter Street Films International
- Distributed by: Norstar Releasing
- Release date: October 8, 1983
- Running time: 84 minutes
- Country: Canada
- Language: English
- Budget: $750,000

Self Defense (released as Siege in other territories) is a 1983 Canadian action film directed by Paul Donovan and Maura O'Connell, and starring Tom Nardini, Brenda Bazinet, Darel Haeny, and Terry-David Després.

== Plot ==
A fascist group calling themselves the "New Order" murder the patrons of a gay bar in Halifax, Nova Scotia while the city's police force is on strike. Daniel, the sole survivor of the massacre, takes refuge in an apartment complex whose residents commit to protecting him from the murderous vigilantes awaiting outside.

== Cast ==
- Tom Nardini – Horatio
- Brenda Bazinet – Barbara
- Darel Haeny – Chester
- Terry-David Després – Daniel
- Jack Blum – Patrick
- Keith Knight – Steve
- Doug Lennox – Cabe
- Jeff Pustil – Goose
- Fred Wadden – Ian
- Gary Dempster – Lloyd
- Dennis O'Connor – Clark
- Richard Collins – Rosie

== Production ==
=== Development ===
Despite the critical, financial, and personal disappointment of South Pacific 1942, a World War II-set black comedy, director Paul Donovan impressed the film's financiers enough for them to back his next project. Donovan and his brother and producing partner Michael Donovan felt an action film would be better suited for their instincts. Donovan used the 1981 Halifax police force strike as the basis for his story.

=== Filming ===
Production began on November 25, 1981 in Halifax, Nova Scotia under the name Siege. The production team borrowed real automatic weapons from a Nova Scotian resident with the largest arsenal in the province. Filming wrapped on December 18, 1981.

== Release ==
=== Theatrical ===
Self Defense released in Canada on October 8, 1983 by Norstar Releasing. New Line Cinema released the film theatrically under the title Siege in the United States.

=== Home media ===
Norstar Home Video distributed the film on VHS in 1985. Severin Films released Self Defense on DVD and Blu-ray for the first time on July 20, 2021.

== Reception ==
TV Guide said "the film is reminiscent of Assault on Precinct 13, though it is not quite as effective". Canuxploitation called it "an unheralded landmark of Canadian B-film". Steven Kuchalski of Shock Cinema Magazine said "this dollop of low-budget Canadian urban violence demonstrates that our Northern neighbors could be just as gritty, visceral and idiotically entertaining when it comes to grindhouse fare." Outlaw Vern positively compared the film to Assault on Precinct 13 and wrote "These Canadians are not fucking around."

Rob Skvarla of Cinepunx called Self Defense a "gripping, white-knuckle thriller." Tyler Doupe of Dread Central cited the film as a "rare example of quality queer representation" for its time. For Pop Horror, Richard Taylor called the film a "diamond in the rough". David Aldridge of The Video Yearbook, said the film was a "superb entertainment", but criticized it for being "predictable". In his book Images in the Dark, Raymond Murray labeled Self Defense as a "violent, nefarious independent production that makes Cruising seem innocuous." Gabriel Sigler of Bad Feeling Magazine wrote "Siege is an unrelenting and underseen Canadian gem".
