= Bill Presser =

Bill Presser was a high-ranking official in the Teamsters union and a participant in organized crime.

== Biography ==
Presser was born in Cleveland, Ohio, joining the labour movement at age 16. In the early 1940s Presser organized the Musical Maintenance Workers Union, later to become Local 442 of the International Brotherhood of Electrical Workers. In 1950 he became a leader in the Teamsters Union, eventually rising to become its international vice-president. In 1952 he was made president of the Ohio Conference of Teamsters, a position he held until his death.

Like others within the Teamsters hierarchy at this time, he had ties to organized crime, particularly the Scalish crime family in Cleveland. Moe Dalitz, a Las Vegas businessman with Cleveland connections, established communication between Hoffa and Presser and others in Cleveland in the 1940s. He advocated for Cleveland mafia loans at pension fund meetings and received $1500 a month in return. As a trustee of the Teamsters pension fund, he voted to approve loans to the mafia, for instance one loan for the mob-run Stardust casino in Las Vegas. Nick Civella, boss of the Kansas City crime family, had approached Presser through Milton J. Rockman to get the loan approved.

He was called in to testify before the US Senate's McClellan Committee probing organized crime in the unions. He answered some questions but pled the Fifth when asked about his personal finances. He was later convicted for obstruction of justice for refusing to answer whether he had destroyed subpoenaed records. A few months later he was found guilty of having destroyed subpoenaed records.

Teamsters official and government informant Edward Partin told the journalist Dan E. Moldea that Jimmy Hoffa, Bill Presser, and I. Irving Davidson "bought a bunch of arms and were selling them to anyone who wanted them in Cuba. They bought some planes from the army surplus, and they were ferrying these weapons and planes from Florida to Cuba". However Davidson denied this, although he admitted he sold "a tremendous amount of tanks and whatnot to Batista in 1959" and that just before Batista fell he "delivered a big package" to the Cuban dictator. In 1971 he was convicted of extorting employers by getting them to purchase ads in a union publication. He received a $12,000 fine and avoided imprisonment due to his age.

In 1975 he officially earned $167,239 from the Teamsters, serving simultaneously as international vice-president, president of the Ohio Conference of Teamsters, president of Cleveland Joint Council 41, and president of Cleveland Local 555. This excluded his travel expenses, including accommodation and entertainment which were also paid for. In 1976 he was overwhelmingly re-elected as international vice-president and to the executive board at the Teamsters convention in Las Vegas. Three months later in September, he was forced to resign from the Central States, Southeast and Southwest Areas Pension Fund of the union by the US Department of Labor because he had pled the Fifth before a committee tasked with investigating fund abuses and loans to organized crime. Three weeks after that he resigned as international vice-president. Presser stated that he resigned of his own free will, however others suggested that it was an attempt by the union to sanitize its image. His son Jackie Presser replaced him.

The Presser father and son duo later endorsed Republican candidate Ronald Reagan for the 1980 presidential election, with Reagan attending a luncheon hosted by the pair. In July 1981 Presser died aged 74, just short of his birthday, at Hillcrest Hospital from a massive heart attack. He was buried at Mount Olive Cemetery and was survived by his children and wife Faye. He remained active in the Teamsters up until his death, having spoken at a Las Vegas Teamsters convention a month prior. He is portrayed by Eli Wallach in the 1992 television film Teamster Boss: The Jackie Presser Story.
