= Doug Lennox =

Canadian actor

- Born: Douglas Joseph Lennox; 21 January 1938; Sudbury, Ontario, Canada
- Died: 28 November 2015 (aged 77); Toronto, Ontario, Canada
- Occupations: Actor; writer; radio personality
- Years active: 1965–2015

Douglas Joseph Lennox (21 January 1938 – 28 November 2015) was a Canadian actor, writer and radio personality, who was perhaps best known for his book Now You Know, The Big Book of Answers and his many appearances in movies such as X-Men and Police Academy.

== Career ==
Lennox originally began his career in radio in 1965.

His first television credit was in Juliette and Friends as the co-host of the series, he has also appeared in several other television series, including The New Avengers, Alfred Hitchcock Presents, My Secret Identity, The Hitchhiker, E.N.G., Once a Thief, Earth: Final Conflict, Honey, I Shrunk the Kids: The TV Show, Cold Squad, The Famous Jett Jackson, Relic Hunter, A Nero Wolfe Mystery, Odyssey 5, 1-800-Missing, Soul Food, The Newsroom, Darcy's Wild Life and The Jon Dore Television Show.

Lennox has also appeared in several films through his career including his most notable credits in X-Men and Police Academy. He has also appeared in Police Academy 3: Back in Training, The Boy in Blue, X-Men: The Last Stand, Harlan County War, Against the Ropes, Mercy, Self Defense and Apocalypse IV: Judgment.

In 2000, Lennox was cast as P.T. Boomer in Britt Allcroft's fantasy adventure film, Thomas and the Magic Railroad. However, he was later cut from the final film due to test audiences saying his character was too scary for younger viewers.

== Death ==
Lennox died in his sleep on 28 November 2015 in Toronto, Ontario, Canada, at the age of 77.

== Filmography ==
=== Film ===
- Breaking Point (1976) – Damoni
- Power Play (1978) – Stauffenberg
- Kelly (1981) – Beechum
- The Last Chase (1981) – Captain
- Self Defense (1983) – Cabe
- Police Academy (1984) – Dirtbag, Main Bad Guy
- The Boy in Blue (1986) – Kane's Pug
- Police Academy 3: Back in Training (1986) – Axe Murderer
- Covert Action (1987) – Phil Harrison
- Blood Brothers (1993) – Lieutenant Evans
- Harrison Bergeron (1995) – Policeman
- At the Midnight Hour (1995) – Sheriff
- Moonshine Highway (1996) – Parker
- Pretty Poison (1996) – Bud Munsch
- Thanks of a Grateful Nation (1998) – Jack Whiting
- The Herd (1998) – Andrew Bahr
- The White Raven (1998) – General Dodd
- Tommy and the Wildcat (1998) – Uncle Jouko (English version, voice)
- Execution of Justice (1999) – Captain
- Mercy (2000) – Mr. Kittrie
- Harlan County War (2000) – Nelms Hatton
- Thomas and the Magic Railroad (2000) – P.T. Boomer (Original version, cut from the theatrical version)
- X-Men (2000) – Albert, The Bartender
- Sanctuary (2001) – Fisherman
- Apocalypse IV: Judgment (2001) – General Tyson Keenen
- Sins of the Father (2002) – Jack Kash
- Interstate 60 (2002) – Hal
- Johnson County War (2002) – Ike 'Texas Ike'
- Master Spy: The Robert Hanssen Story (2002) (TV) – Mr. Hanssen Sr.
- DC 9/11: Time of Crisis (2003) – General Tommy Francks
- Against the Ropes (2004) – Barrel Chested Man
- X-Men: The Last Stand (2006) – Albert, The Bartender (Alternate ending)
- Lars and the Real Girl (2007) – Vehement Church Goer

=== Television ===
- Juliette and Friends (1973) – Co-Host
- The New Avengers – "The Gladiators" (1977) – Nada
- The Execution of Raymond Graham (1985)
- Alfred Hitchcock Presents (1987) – Patrol Man
- My Secret Identity (1988) – Goon
- The Hitchhiker (1989) – Sheriff
- E.N.G. (1989) – Staff Inspector
- Due South (1996) – Lieutenant Will Kelly
- Once a Thief (1998) – Mr. Horner
- Earth: Final Conflict (1998) – Colonel Edward Purcell
- Honey, I Shrunk the Kids: The TV Show (1998) – General Jennings
- Cold Squad (1999) – Nathan Larson
- The Famous Jett Jackson (2000) – Chief of Staff
- Relic Hunter (2002) – Asher
- A Nero Wolfe Mystery (2002) – Multiple Roles
- Odyssey 5 (2002) – Roger Mason
- 1-800-Missing (2003) – Jeff Greenwalt
- Soul Food (2000–2004) – Regular Guest
- The Newsroom (2004) – Conrad Daniels
- Darcy's Wild Life (2005) – Murdoch
- The Jon Dore Television Show (2007–2009) – Cowboy
- Deadliest Sea (2009) – Pilot
