= Allen Dorfman =

American businessman and convicted felon (1920-1983)

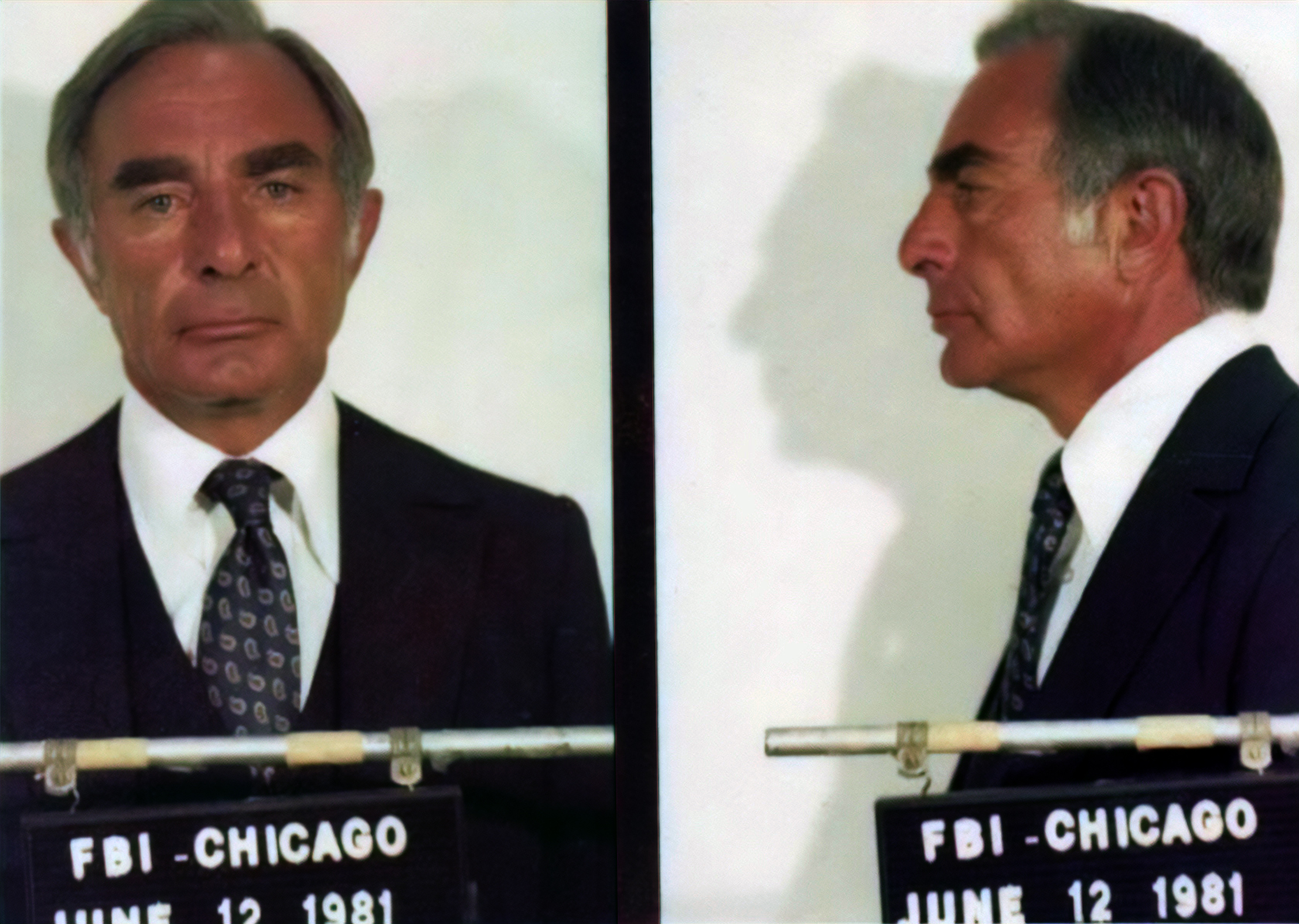
- FBI mugshot of Dorfman
- Born: January 6, 1923; Chicago, Illinois, U.S.
- Died: January 20, 1983 (aged 60); Lincolnwood, Illinois, U.S.
- Cause of death: Murder
- Education: Marshall Metropolitan High School; University of Illinois at Urbana–Champaign
- Spouse: Lynn
- Children: 4
- Father: Paul Dorfman

Allen Melnick Dorfman (January 6, 1923 – January 20, 1983) was an American insurance agency owner and a consultant to the International Brotherhood of Teamsters (IBT) Central States Pension Fund. He was a close associate of longtime IBT President Jimmy Hoffa and associated with organized crime via the Chicago Outfit. Dorfman was convicted on several felony counts and was murdered in 1983.

== Early years ==
Allen Dorfman was born in Chicago, Illinois, in 1923 to a working-class Jewish family, the son or stepson of Paul J. "Red" Dorfman (1901–1971) and Rose Ritman (1907–2003). He attended Marshall High School in Chicago. He was born Allen Dorfman, even though his mother was not yet married to Dorfman, but as a teenager also went by the name Allen Melnick, which may have been his biological father's name. He enlisted in the US Marines and earned a Silver Star at the Battle of Iwo Jima.

Paul "Red" Dorfman was the head of the Chicago Waste Handler's Union and a kingpin in the Chicago Outfit, who in 1959 was described by Congressional investigators "as the link between the Teamsters Union and the Chicago underworld."

In 1949, Allen was making $4,000 a year (roughly $56,000 in 2026) as a physical education teacher at the University of Illinois when Red struck a deal with Jimmy Hoffa, then head of the Teamsters Union in Michigan. According to FBI files, Red agreed to introduce Hoffa to mob figures in exchange for Allen's entry into the Teamsters' insurance business. Allen and his mother set up Union Insurance Agency, and in 1950, would receive their first contract with the Teamsters. Allen was a millionaire within five years.

Red Dorfman had troubles with the AFL–CIO when he was caught taking funds out of the labor union's health and welfare fund, and, among other things, paying personal bills with the membership's money. Red Dorfman was one of only two trustees on the fund. In addition, Red Dorfman had deposited $150,000 of health and welfare money with a bank owned by a friend, George Sax, who did not pay interest. Sax was the owner of the Saxony Hotel in Miami Beach, Florida, which was a meeting place for Hoffa, Dorfman, Robert Shulman and others when they were visiting South Florida.

== Teamsters connections ==
Allen Dorfman rose to prominence following World War II and by the late 1950s was a close cohort of IBT President Jimmy Hoffa. Dorfman's rise coincided with enormous expansion in Teamsters' ranks, along with spectacular growth in the union's pension funds, which eventually came largely under Dorfman's administration. Allen's stepfather Paul was a close friend of Hoffa and both Dorfmans were partners with Hoffa in a number of business ventures.

Through mobster Santo Perrone, Jimmy Hoffa had met Paul Dorfman, who had done business with Perrone through the Chicago Scrap Handlers' Union. Through Paul, Allen Dorfman entered into a working relationship with Joey Glimco, Paul DeLucia and Sam Giancana. Through his stepfather, Allen met Hoffa and Local 337's president, Owen Bert Brennan.

At Paul Dorfman's request the Union Casualty and Life Insurance Company had set up a Chicago branch, owned by Paul Dorfman's wife, Allen's mother Rosemary "Rose", and his stepson Allen. In early 1949, Hoffa set up the Michigan Conference of Teamsters Welfare Fund. In 1951, he persuaded two trustees of the fund, Frank Fitzsimmons and an employer trustee, to move the fund's business to the newly formed Chicago branch of Union Casualty Agency, despite the fact that Allen had no experience in the insurance business.

When Union Casualty received fiduciary responsibility for the Michigan Conference Fund, Hoffa had already created a larger welfare fund, the Central States Health and Welfare Fund, which had also given its business to Union Casualty. The two fund accounts made up 90% of the branch company's contracts. During the first eight years of fiduciary management by Union Casualty the Dorfmans made more than $3 million in commissions and service fees. In one instance, Allen took $51,462 in premiums and simply deposited it in a special account that he maintained with his mother, with no complaints from the Teamsters.

In 1953, a special investigatory committee established by the United States House of Representatives began inquiries into Hoffa's placement of Central States Health and Welfare Fund's moneys with Dorfman's agency. Both Paul and Allen Dorfman refused to cooperate with the Committee, which recommended that they be cited for contempt.

In 1959, the McClellan Committee, a United States Senate group investigating potential crimes and improprieties in the US labor movement, inquired again over the allegedly excessive fees paid by the Teamsters Central States Health and Welfare Fund to Dorfman's company. The Committee also suspected that large cash withdrawals from the business were actually kickbacks to Jimmy Hoffa. Evidence presented to the Committee showed, on the other hand, that while the Dorfmans had proposed a 17.5% fee to the Fund, they had actually been paid only 7.6%, in line with prevailing rates in the industry, over the previous eight years.

During the late 1950s, Dorfman became involved in approving loans for the Teamsters' Central States, Southeast and Southwest Areas Pension Fund. Many of these loans were real estate loans to associates of high-ranking Teamster leaders or to organized crime-connected casinos in Las Vegas, Nevada.

Among the loans he later made was a $160 million loan to Argent Corporation, which owned a group of casinos, including the Stardust Resort & Casino. The casinos at that time were infiltrated by organized crime and profits were being heavily skimmed and paid to organized crime. A number of organized crime members were later convicted for their involvement in that skimming.

Allen Dorfman was peripherally involved in the United States Department of Justice's prosecution of Hoffa for his involvement with a trucking company known as Test Fleet that he and Brennan had established in the 1950s in their wives' names and with the assistance of Commercial Carriers, Inc., a major trucking carrier whose employees the Teamsters represented. The United States Department of Justice brought criminal charges against Hoffa for accepting bribes from Commercial Carriers.

The "Test Fleet" prosecution resulted in a hung jury in December 1962. However Hoffa, Dorfman, and other Hoffa allies were charged with jury tampering that led to the hung jury. Dorfman was acquitted, but Hoffa was found guilty of this crime in 1964 and, after a lengthy appeals process, went to prison in 1967. After Hoffa went to prison in 1967, Dorfman took effective control of the Central States Pension Fund.

Allen Dorfman was apparently well-respected by the mob. A Chicago Outfit mob boss was once heard discussing Dorfman with a subordinate saying, "Allen [Dorfman] is not that type of guy, but the people that got a piece of him are that type of guy. Allen is meek and Allen is harmless. But the people behind him are not meek and they are not harmless."

In May 1968 he attended the Big Brother Testimonial Dinner for Drew Pearson. Afterwards he accompanied Frank Sinatra, I. Irving Davidson and Hoffa's wife Josephine at a dinner in Rive Gauche Restaurant. In October 1975 he attended a meeting with then recently resigned President Richard Nixon, alongside Teamsters president Frank Fitzsimmons, Tony Provenzano and other Teamsters officials.

== Embezzlement conviction ==
Dorfman was eventually indicted, along with several other Teamsters leaders, for embezzlement from the union pension fund, in 1970. Dorfman was convicted and sentenced to one year in federal prison. He was again investigated in 1973 on similar charges, related to payoffs given to have the Teamsters represent agricultural workers in California, in place of the United Farm Workers Union.

In February 1974, Dorfman was indicted for fraud involving $1.4 million in loans made by the Teamsters' pension fund to Gaylur Products/American Pail Company, a plastics manufacturing company in Deming, New Mexico. Indicted along with Dorfman were Joseph Lombardo (aka "Joey the Clown"), Anthony Spilotro ("The Ant"), Irwin Weiner, and several others. Between 1959 and 1969, the Central States Pension Fund Plan loans had gone unpaid. But in 1971, Irwin Weiner, a prominent bail-bondsman, organized crime associate and friend of Jack Ruby, had purchased stock in the company and received another $1.4 million loan from the fund with a mere $7,000 deposit. The government's case collapsed after their main witness, Daniel Seifert, was murdered in September 1974 and the defendants were either acquitted or dropped from the indictment. Lombardo was convicted of Seifert's murder in 2007 as a result of Operation Family Secrets.

By 1977, Dorfman had lost control of the Central States, Southeast and Southwest Areas Pension Fund due to the implementation of the Employee Retirement Income Security Act of 1974 and subsequent increases in outside control of the Fund.

== Murder ==
In 1979, the Federal Bureau of Investigation launched "Operation Pendorf" (for penetration of Allen Dorfman). The FBI installed hidden microphones in the office of Dorfman's insurance agency. As a result of information obtained from the wiretaps, a federal grand jury in Chicago indicted Dorfman and four others in May 1981. Dorfman was subsequently convicted in December 1982, along with Teamsters president Roy Lee Williams and Chicago Outfit enforcer Joseph Lombardo, of conspiring to bribe Howard Cannon, the Democratic Senator from Nevada, to oppose deregulation of the over-the-road trucking industry.

Three days before his sentencing, scheduled for January 23, 1983, Allen Dorfman was murdered in the parking lot outside the Lincolnwood Hyatt in Lincolnwood, Illinois. Described as a gangland-style execution, the murder was presumably intended to keep him from cooperating with authorities to avoid a possible 55-year prison sentence. He was with longtime friend Irwin Weiner, a known associate of many Chicago mob figures. Weiner was not injured in the incident and the killing remains unsolved. Weiner was never threatened by the gunman and was questioned for several hours after the shooting. It is believed that Weiner had set Dorfman up.

== Personal life ==
Dorfman attended the University of Illinois and taught physical education there. He and his wife, Lynn, had four children, James, Michael, David and Kim.

== In fiction ==
Tony Lo Bianco was cast as Allen Dorfman in HBO's 1992 TV-movie: Teamster Boss: The Jackie Presser Story; briefly recreating Dorfman's final years (post-Hoffa disappearance, Dorfman's criminal conviction(s), and aforementioned Outfit execution).

Alan King portrayed a character named Andy Stone in the 1995 Martin Scorsese film Casino. The character was based on elements from Allen Dorfman's life. Dorfman is portrayed by Jake Hoffman in the 2019 Martin Scorsese film The Irishman.

== See also ==
- List of homicides in Illinois § Organized crime
- List of unsolved murders (1980–1999)
