= Purple Hotel =

Former hotel in Lincolnwood, Illinois

- Formerly listed on the U.S. National Register of Historic Places
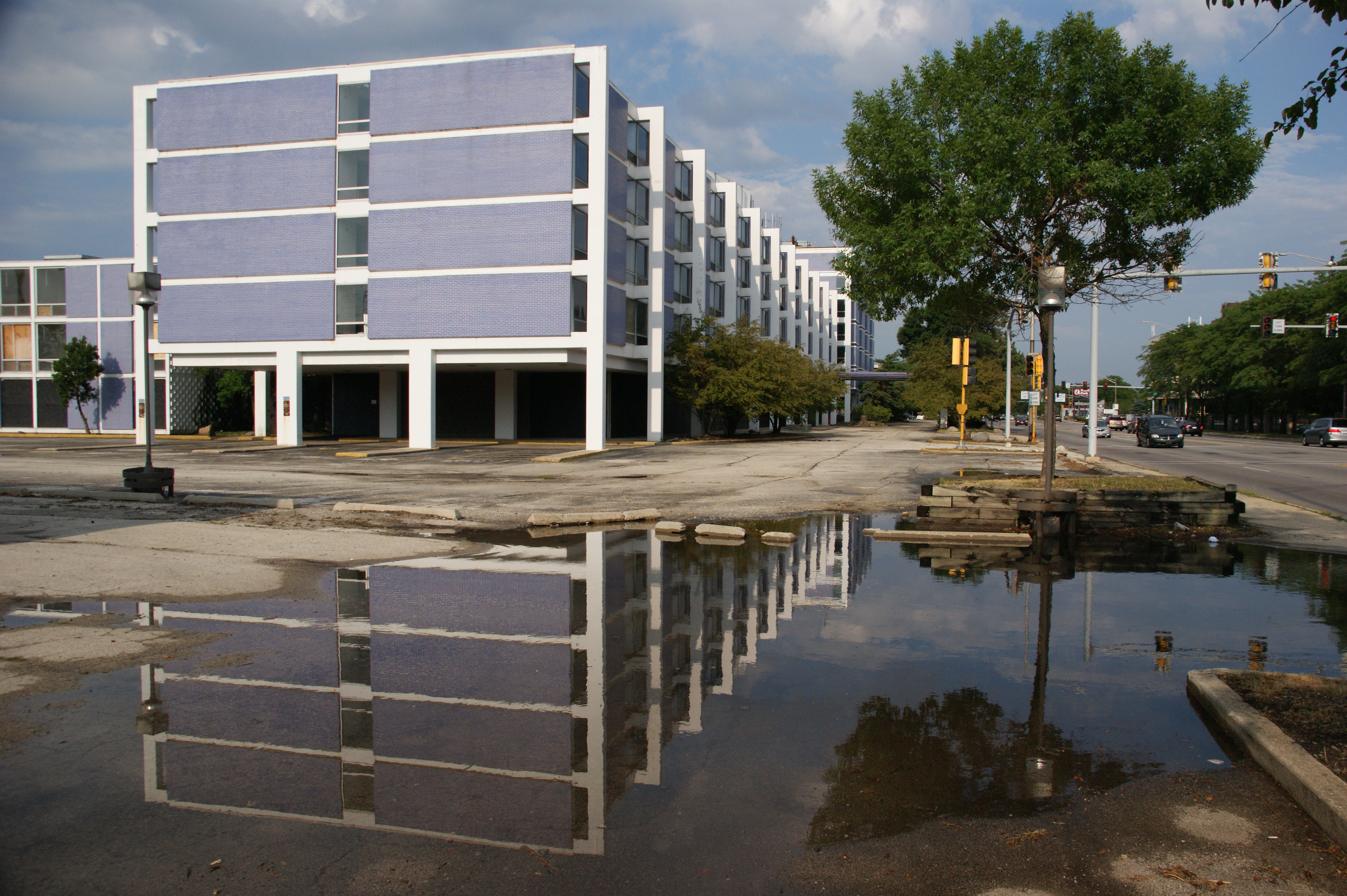
- The Purple Hotel in July 2012

- Location within Illinois Location within the United States
- Location: 4500 West Touhy Avenue, Lincolnwood, Illinois
- Coordinates: 42°00′44″N 87°44′30″W
- Built: 1960
- Architect: Hausner & Macsai
- Architectural style: Modern
- NRHP reference No.: 13000553

Significant dates
- Added to NRHP: July 31, 2013
- Removed from NRHP: January 2, 2020

The Purple Hotel was located at 4500 West Touhy Avenue in Lincolnwood, Illinois. Opened in 1962 as the Hyatt House Hotel, it was Hyatt's first Midwest hotel and became known for its purple brick exterior. The hotel served as Hyatt's flagship Chicago area hotel until the 1970s and featured two restaurants and live music from popular acts. In 1983, Teamsters financier and mobster Allen Dorfman was killed in the hotel's parking lot. After a series of ownership changes, the hotel closed in 2007 and was demolished in August 2013. The hotel was added to the National Register of Historic Places in July 2013, and was delisted in 2020.

== History ==
The Hyatt House Hotel opened in 1962. Architects Hausner & Macsai designed the building in a modern design. The source of its unusual purple exterior is disputed: an owner claimed it was intended to be dark blue and the purple was a manufacturing error, while the original architect claims that his clients had specifically chosen the purple bricks against his recommendation. The hotel's amenities included two upscale restaurants, Tessy's and T.J. Peppercorn's; an outdoor pool, which one visiting pianist called "the greatest"; and live entertainment from musicians such as Perry Como, Roberta Flack, and Barry Manilow.

The hotel, by then known as the Hyatt Lincolnwood, became known for a murder in 1983, when Teamsters lawyer and Chicago Outfit mobster Allen Dorfman was shot in its parking lot. Dorfman had recently been convicted of conspiracy to bribe a U.S. Senator and was likely killed to prevent him from releasing information to authorities in exchange for a lighter sentence. The hotel also hosted swingers parties in the 1980s; according to convict Stuart Levine's testimony in two corruption trials, the parties were notorious for sex and heavy drug usage. In the 1990s, the hotel changed ownership and was operated by Radisson and Ramada, until it simply became known as the Purple Hotel in 2004.

== Closure and demolition ==
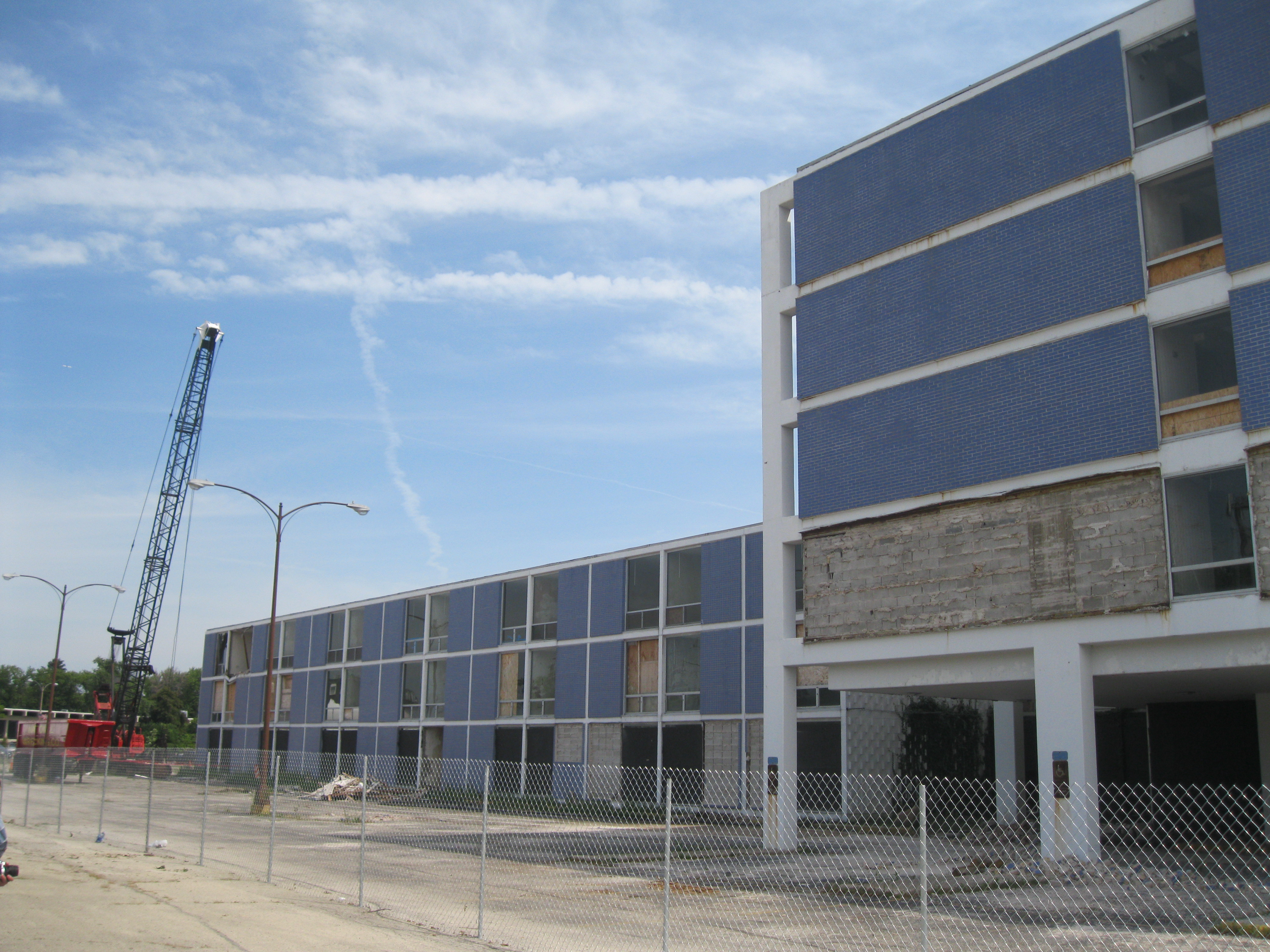
Demolition work begins on the hotel

The Purple Hotel closed in January 2007 due to health code violations. A village inspection had found mold in 208 of the 225 rooms visited as well as failing windows, roof leakage, and problems with the hotel's fire sprinkler system. After the hotel closed, the village threatened to demolish it unless a developer was willing to restore it. The building and property were auctioned to a Lincolnwood resident, sole bidder Jake Weiss. His new ownership realized a near-replica rebuilding of The Purple Hotel – complete with already purchased and loaned artifacts from the original. He teamed up with the Skokie-based North Capital Group along with architect Jackie Koo to rehabilitate the 8.5-acre property. A campaign to save the hotel began and the building was eventually listed on the National Register of Historic Places in July 2013. The North Capital Group purchased the building in 2011, intending to preserve and renovate the hotel. The group eventually decided instead to demolish it and convert the property to a mixed-use retail development. Before its demolition, the hotel's purple bricks were sold off at the 2013 Lincolnwood Fest as a fundraiser for the Lincolnwood Public Library. The hotel was demolished on August 27, 2013. As of February, 2020, the property (renamed the District 1860 site) will feature a Residence Inn, a Spring Hill Suites, approximately 300 apartments, restaurants and retail.
