= Juliette and Friends =

Canadian talk show

- Genre: Talk show
- Presented by: Juliette
- Country of origin: Canada
- Original language: English
- No. of seasons: 2

Production
- Producer: Don Brown
- Running time: 30 minutes

Original release
- Network: CBC Television
- Release: 17 September 1973 – 12 September 1975

Juliette and Friends is a Canadian talk show that aired on CBC Television from 1973 to 1975.

== Premise ==
This talk show was hosted by Juliette who was regularly featured on CBC Television and in her own series from the mid-1950s until 1966. Various topics were presented, with theme days on interior decorating (Tuesdays) and new artists (Thursdays). She was joined by different co-hosts during the program's run, namely Larry Solway, Bill Lawrence or Doug Lennox.

== Scheduling ==
This half-hour program was broadcast weekdays at 2:00 p.m. (Eastern) from 17 September 1973 to 6 May 1974, followed by rebroadcast episodes until 6 September 1974. The program moved to the 3:00 p.m. weekday time slot in the second season from 9 September 1974 to 12 September 1975.
