= The Comfort News =

Weekly newspaper in Comfort, Texas, US

- Type: Weekly newspaper
- Format: Broadsheet
- Owner(s): Bob Barton Jr. and Don Trepaignier
- Founder(s): Vincent McAteer
- Publisher: Deborah and Michael Hawkins
- Editor: Michael Hawkins
- Founded: 1904
- Headquarters: 636 Second Street Comfort, Texas 78013
- Circulation: 1,050 (as of 2023)
- OCLC number: 14061151
- Website: www.thecomfortnews.com

The Comfort News is a weekly newspaper in Comfort, Texas.

== History ==
Originally founded by Vincent McAteer in 1904, it was sold to Emma D'Albini Belsey and her husband George in 1925, with Emma taking over as publisher and editor, making her one of the early female editors of a Texas newspaper. As the Kerrville Times exclaimed in 1933: "Who said that a woman could not edit an interesting, up-to-the-minute newspaper!"

Emma Belsey sold her financial interest in the paper to her son, George Belsey, in 1953, but remained connected with the publication until the early 1960s. It was sold to Reed Harp in 1968, who subsequently sold it to Bob Barton, Jr. and Don Trepaignier in 1972.
