= Our Fellow Americans =

- Genre: Documentary
- Created by: Sam Levene
- Written by: Larry Solway
- Narrated by: Larry Solway
- Country of origin: Canada
- Original language: English
- No. of seasons: 1
- No. of episodes: 8

Production
- Producer: Sam Levene
- Running time: 30 minutes

Original release
- Network: CBC Television
- Release: 27 May – 5 August 1976

Our Fellow Americans is a Canadian documentary television miniseries that aired on CBC Television in 1976.

== Premise ==
This eight-episode series featured interviews with various people in the United States in recognition of that nation's bicentennial. Host Larry Solway interviewed such Americans as writer Ray Bradbury, Luckenbach, Texas personality "Hondo" Crouch, billionaire Nelson Bunker Hunt, Georgia governor Lester Maddox and Chicago author-broadcaster Studs Terkel. Each episode dwelled on a particular region of the United States such as California, Florida, the Mississippi River, New England, New York and Texas.

== Scheduling ==
This half-hour series was broadcast on Thursdays at 9:00 p.m. (Eastern) from 27 May to 5 August 1976.
