= Larry Solway =

Canadian broadcaster

- Born: 13 March 1928; Toronto, Ontario, Canada
- Died: 9 January 2012 (aged 83); Toronto, Ontario, Canada
- Occupation: broadcaster
- Years active: 1960s–1990s

Lawrence S. "Larry" Solway (13 August 1928 – 9 January 2012) was a Canadian actor and broadcaster.

== Career ==
During the 1960s he hosted radio programmes at CHUM in Toronto such as the early Canadian talk show Speak Your Mind. He left the station in 1970 due to a dispute with the station over a series of shows on sex. In the aftermath, he wrote The Day I Invented Sex about the controversy.

Solway was known nationally as a panellist of the CBC Television programme This Is the Law in the early 1970s. He returned to the radio talk show circuit later that decade with Talkback on Brampton, Ontario station CHIC until management there dismissed him without warning. He was seen in minor roles in films such as Meatballs and The Brood. In the late 1970s he was a columnist for the newly launched Sunday Star.

He was a candidate for the Ontario New Democratic Party in the 1999 Ontario general election but was unsuccessful in his campaign in St. Paul's riding.

=== Radio ===
- 1960s: Speak Your Mind, 1050 CHUM
- September 1976 - January 1979: Talkback (CHIC)
- September 1986 – ?: Larry Solway Show, CFGM
- 1989 – ?: talk show, CFLY-FM Talk show host CFRB 1991–92, Talk 640 1995-97

=== Television ===
- Hawkeye and the Last of the Mohicans, Indian characters (1957–58)
- Flashback (1966–68), panellist
- various CBC Television news features (1971–74)
- This Is the Law (1971–75), panellist - CBC
- Juliette and Friends (1973–75), co-host
- Larry Solway Show (1974–76) - syndicated
- Our Fellow Americans (1976) - 8-part CBC documentary

=== Film ===
- Meatballs (1979) as Interviewer
- The Brood (1979) as Lawyer

=== Books ===
- The Day I Invented Sex (McClelland and Stewart, 1971; ISBN 978-0-7710-8205-4)
- Don't Be Blindsided by Retirement (2008; ISBN 0-9783286-1-2). Author Andrew Bertram; Solway was a contributor.

=== Theatre ===
Solway returned to the stage from 1979 to 1984, with appearances at Neptune Halifax, Oakville, Red Barn, Teller's Cage, and the National Arts Centre. He appeared in leading roles in Same Time Next Year, Plaza Suite, The Subject Was Roses, and Last of the Red Hot Lovers.

== Personal life ==
In a column written for Straight Goods, Solway lamented the "Christmas Envy" that he felt as a Jew.

Solway was diagnosed with bladder cancer at age 83. In November 2011, he wrote a final blog post to say goodbye to his readers. He died 9 January 2012, at Toronto General Hospital of complications arising from the cancer.
