= Honey, I Shrunk the Kids: The TV Show =

American syndicated comic science fiction sitcom

- Genre: Comic science fiction Family sitcom
- Created by: Ed Ferrara; Kevin Murphy (Based on characters created by Stuart Gordon, Brian Yuzna and Ed Naha)
- Starring: Peter Scolari; Barbara Alyn Woods; Hillary Tuck; Thomas Dekker; George Buza (seasons 2–3)
- Composers: Peter Bernstein; Christopher L. Stone
- Country of origin: United States
- Original language: English
- No. of seasons: 3
- No. of episodes: 66 (list of episodes)

Production
- Executive producers: Leslie Belzberg; John Landis
- Camera setup: Film; Single-camera
- Running time: 48 minutes
- Production companies: Plymouth Productions; St. Clare Entertainment; Walt Disney Television

Original release
- Network: First-run syndication
- Release: September 27, 1997 – May 20, 2000

Honey, I Shrunk the Kids: The TV Show (truncated to Honey, I Shrunk the Kids in the show's title sequence) is an American syndicated comic science fiction series based on the 1989 film. It expands upon the original film's concept of a shrinking experiment gone wrong to include a myriad of experiments gone awry. The hour-long program debuted in syndication on September 27, 1997, and ran for three consecutive seasons, concluding with the 66th episode on May 20, 2000.

Peter Scolari took over the role of Wayne Szalinski, the wacky inventor played by Rick Moranis in the original film. Each episode incorporates new technologies and digital effects to feature the family in various new adventures. The series was filmed in Calgary, Alberta, with its main studios located in Currie Barracks, a decommissioned Canadian Forces dormitory.

== Episodes ==
Season	Episodes	Originally released	
Season	Episodes	First released	Last released
1	22	September 22, 1997	May 16, 1998
2	22	September 26, 1998	June 12, 1999
3	22	September 25, 1999	May 20, 2000

== Characters ==
The Szalinski family are the only returning characters from the films. Wayne Szalinski (Peter Scolari), the show's protagonist, is the husband of Diane and the father of Amy and Nick. The well-meaning Wayne constructs a variety of inventions, including the Shrink-Ray, Neuron Nudger and Brainiactivator among others, that often create predicaments for his family. His wife, Diane Szalinski (Barbara Alyn Woods), is a lawyer. Diane supports Wayne and is very loving, but gets fed up with his antics. The family have a dog, Quark, who is played by Matese in the first season, but by Rusty in seasons two and three.

Amy Szalinski (Hillary Tuck) is the oldest child of Wayne and Diane. She displays the normal teenage angst, but loves her family no matter what. Her younger brother, Nick (Thomas Dekker), is very much like Wayne and also enjoys inventing things. However, unlike his father, he believes in and has an extensive knowledge of the supernatural. He and Amy bicker like most siblings, but generally get along fairly well and will go out of their way for each other when one is in trouble.

The series picks up with the Szalinski household relocating to Matheson, Colorado. Next door to the Szalinskis are the McKennas. Jake McKenna (George Buza) is chief of the police force. He is usually caught up with the Szalinskis' mishaps. His younger son, Joel, is one of Nick's friends. His older son, Jack, is an occasional love interest for Amy.

== Cast ==
=== Main ===
The main characters of the TV series (from left to right), Diane, Wayne, Nick, Amy Szalinski, and the family dog, Quark (portrayed by Mattise). Photographed by Charles Bush.

Actor/Actress	Character	Years	Episodes
Peter Scolari	Wayne Szalinski	1997–2000	66 episodes
Barbara Alyn Woods	Diane Szalinski	1997–2000	66 episodes
Hillary Tuck	Amy Szalinski	1997–2000	66 episodes
Thomas Dekker	Nick Szalinski	1997–2000	66 episodes
George Buza	Chief Jake McKenna	1998–2000	30 episodes

=== Recurring ===
Actor/Actress	Character	Years	Episodes
Bruce Jarchow	H. Gordon Jennings	1997–2000	16 episodes
Andrew T. Grant	Joel McKenna	1998–2000	13 episodes
Mark Hildreth	Jack McKenna	1998–2000	3 episodes
Jewel Staite	Tiara Vanhorn	1997–1999	5 episodes
Hilary Alexander	Ms. Elders	1998–1999	10 episodes
David Lereaney	Mr. Patterson	1997–1998	9 episodes
Vanessa King	Danielle	1997–1999	8 episodes
Wilson Wong	Myron	1999–2000	5 episodes
Miranda Frigon	Veronica	1998–1999	5 episodes
Christine Willes	Mrs. Gotteramerding	1999	3 episodes
John Michael Higgins	Ar'nox	1997–1998	3 episodes
Doug MacLeod	Dan	1997–1999	4 episodes
Thierry P. Nihill	Russell	1997–1998	4 episodes
Valarie Pettiford	Bianca Fleischer	1997	2 episodes

== Production history ==
The Honey, I Shrunk the Kids television series launched in September 1997, shortly after the last film in its namesake trilogy, Honey, We Shrunk Ourselves, was released direct to video. The focus of the television series was on the Szalinski family as they were in the first film, with Wayne and Diane Szalinski living with and raising their children Amy and Nick. The Szalinskis' third child Adam, who was introduced in Honey, I Blew Up the Kid, was never mentioned in the series; it was not clear if the series took place before he was born until the penultimate episode, in which Diane announced she was pregnant which indicated that the show took place between the first film and the sequel.

The film franchise's star Rick Moranis is mentioned briefly in one episode where Amy tells Wayne that he resembles him. However, Wayne is clueless as to who Moranis is.

After the first season, writers Ed Ferrara and Kevin Murphy left the show. Ed Naha, one of the creators of the original "Honey" film, came aboard as both head writer and co-executive producer for the final two seasons. The second season would also see Stuart Gordon, another of the original film's creators and executive producer of Honey, I Blew Up the Kid, direct an episode ("Honey, Let's Trick or Treat").

The third season saw a precipitous drop in ratings and Disney announced it was ending production after three seasons. The series finale aired on May 20, 2000.

== Syndication ==
Reruns of the series aired on Disney Channel from 2001 to 2004, and aired on Discovery Family from October 11, 2010 until September 13, 2013.

== Awards and nominations ==
Daytime Emmy Awards

- 1999 – Outstanding Sound Editing – Christopher Harvengt, Kim Naves, James A. Williams, Jason W. Jennings and Tiffany S. Griffith (Nominated)
- 2000 – Outstanding Sound Mixing – Bill Thiederman, Dean Okrand, Mike Brooks and Clancy Livingston (Tied with Bill Nye the Science Guy and Bear in the Big Blue House) (won)
- 2001 – Outstanding Sound Mixing – Clancy Livingston, Dean Okrand, Bill Thiederman and Mike Brooks (won)

== See also ==
- Maniac Mansion, an earlier program with a similar premise, also starring George Buza
