= I. Irving Davidson =

I. Irving Davidson (1921 – 2017) was an American arms dealer, political middleman and lobbyist. According to Davidson, he began to establish himself as an "expeditor" for the War Production Board during World War 2 and that he had been "expediting ever since".

== Biography ==
Davidson had extensive international contacts and relationships. In the 1980s he told a reporter that he was "involved in some very sensitive stuff overseas.....talking to people who our own people can't talk to". He was registered under FARA as a lobbyist for the Nicaraguan dictator Luis Somoza Debayle. Over the duration of 1955-1960 he was paid over $500,000 by Somoza. In 1963 he testified before the Senate Foreign Relations Committee on his lobbying for Nicaragua. Davidson's testimony was taken in a closed session, with the transcript running to 175 pages. In 1957 Davidson arranged for the purchase of 68 staghound tanks for Somoza from Israel. He struck a deal between Fulgencio Batista of Cuba and Somoza to divert 28 of these to the Caribbean island in February 1958. After Dominican president Joaquín Balaguer was exiled from the country in 1962, the US Department of State kept in touch with the former president with Davidson functioning as a liaison. Davidson was a lobbyist for the Haitian dictator François "Papa Doc" Duvalier.

Davidson was a close associate of Jimmy Hoffa. During 1961 and 1962, he received a $7 million loan from the Teamster Pension Fund. He served as an intermediatory between Hoffa and then-Vice President Richard Nixon's representative Allan Oakley Hunter and introduced Hoffa to Texas governor John B. Connally at a Democratic Party event in Los Angeles, 1960. He accompanied Hoffa in court during his 1963 trial for jury tampering. Government informant Edward Partin told the journalist Dan E. Moldea that Hoffa, Bill Presser, and Davidson "bought a bunch of arms and were selling them to anyone who wanted them in Cuba. They bought some planes from the army surplus, and they were ferrying these weapons and planes from Florida to Cuba". However Davidson denied this, although he admitted he sold "a tremendous amount of tanks and whatnot to Batista in 1959" and that just before Batista fell he "delivered a big package" to the Cuban dictator.

He also had ties to New Orleans crime boss Carlos Marcello, who Davidson boasted that he was a "door opener and arranger" for. In 1981 Marcello and Davidson were put on trial for attempting to obtain public insurance contracts via bribery and kickbacks. Marcello was convicted but Davidson was found not guilty. The FBI had wiretapped Davidson's phone and recorded his conversations. On 8 February 1980 his offices and home was searched by the FBI. Davidson claimed that the FBI had offered not to charge him if he agreed to provide them with information on Marcello, stating "They made it very obvious to me that if I would help them get Marcello, they would not embarrass me in Washington by indicting me".

In April 1980 he set up a meeting between Gary Sick of the National Security Council and Dr Omar Zawawi, the brother of Omani foreign minister Qais Zawawi. He helped negotiate a water desalinization enterprise between Aqua-Chem and Dr. Zawawi's Omzest Corp. Another client of Davidson's, was the Texan oilman Clint Murchison Sr. He was a regular guest at El Charro, Murchison's home in California. Through Davidson, Murchison arranged a large loan from the Teamsters Central States Pension Fund.

He was a contact of the journalists Jack Anderson and Drew Pearson, serving as a source of information for their reporting. Anderson rented office space to Davidson and over the years Davidson would provide him with a number of individuals who would serve as sources for his stories, for instance Bobby Baker, Lyndon B. Johnson's advisor. In May 1968 he attended the Big Brother Testimonial Dinner for Drew Pearson. Afterwards he accompanied Allen Dorfman, Frank Sinatra, and Hoffa's wife Josephine at a dinner in Rive Gauche Restaurant. On 2 November 1978 Davidson was interviewed by the House Select Committee on Assassinations about his dealings in Haiti and his suspected ties to George de Mohrenschildt.
