= William J. Coughlin =

American novelist

William Jeremiah Coughlin (1929 - 1992) is the popular author behind such novels as The Twelve Apostles, Her Father's Daughter, Her Honor, In The Presence Of Enemies, and Shadow of a Doubt (1991). He also wrote Cain's Chinese Adventure and The Mark of Cain under the pseudonym Sean A. Key.

Coughlin combined a career as a United States administrative judge in Detroit with that of a best selling novelist. It is often thought that his experience as a judge may have been some inspiration for his law- and courtroom-themed thrillers.
