= Joseph Andriacchi =

American criminal (1932–2024)

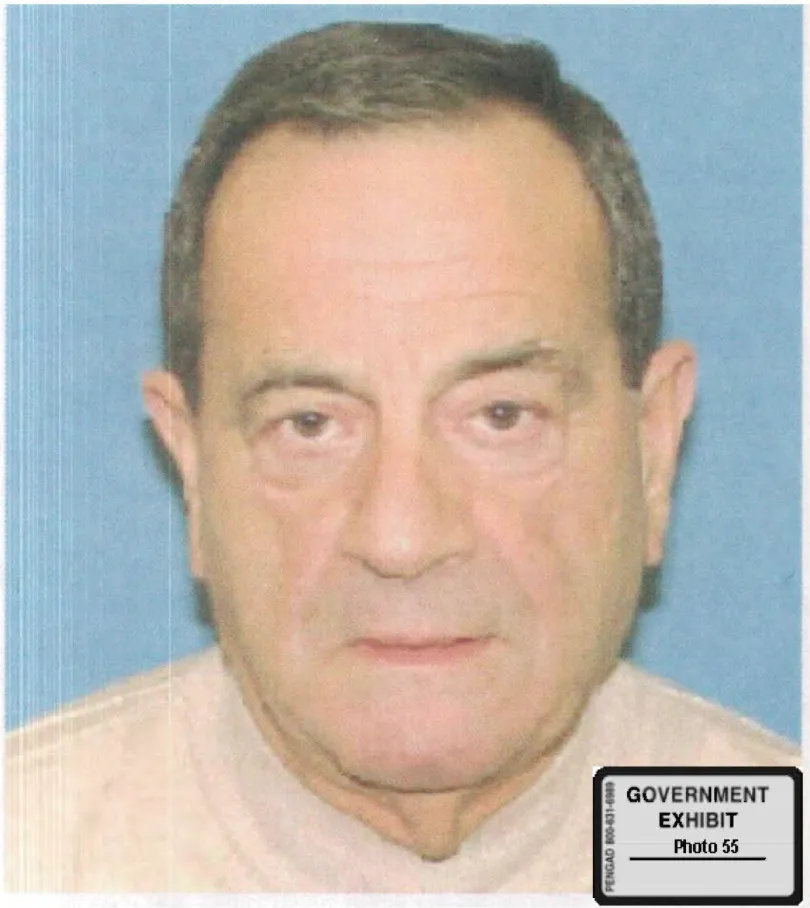
- Andriacchi's mugshot
- Born: October 20, 1932; Chicago, Illinois, U.S.
- Died: August 10, 2024 (aged 91); Elmwood Park, Illinois, U.S.
- Other names: "The Builder"; "The Sledgehammer"
- Occupation: Mobster
- Allegiance: Chicago Outfit

Joseph Andriacchi (October 20, 1932 – August 10, 2024) was an American convicted criminal who was resident in the Chicago area, considered by that city's Crime Commission to be a high-ranking member of the Outfit, the city's LCN organization.

== Chicago Outfit career ==
In 1989, the Chicago Sun-Times reported that Andriacchi had been elevated to being the second-in-command in the Chicago Outfit. The article identified Andriacchi as having two nicknames: "the Sledgehammer"—because of his unsubtle ways as a safe cracker—and "the Builder". The article also noted that Andriacchi had been imprisoned on burglary charges from 1968 until 1971.

Andriacchi was one of several reputed mobsters ordered to appear before a federal grand jury after the May 17, 1992, bombing of a car outside the home of a daughter of Leonard Patrick, who was in the process of testifying against several known mobsters.

Andriacchi was identified in a 1995 Chicago Tribune article as being an underboss for day-to-day operations for the Chicago Outfit.

In 1997, the Chicago Sun-Times reported that Andriacchi was "at the top of the Outfit's new organizational chart," identifying Andriacchi as a reported longtime lieutenant of Chicago Outfit kingpin John DiFronzo.

After the conclusion of the "Family Secrets trial" in Chicago in 2007, which sent multiple high-ranking members of the Chicago Outfit to prison for long sentences, Andriacchi was again identified in Chicago newspapers as being a powerful member of the Chicago Outfit. "Reputed mobsters not charged in the Family Secrets case who are still powerful in the Outfit include John "No Nose" DiFronzo (deceased 2018), Joe "The Builder" Andriacchi, Al Tornabene (deceased 2009), Frank "Tootsie" Caruso, Marco D'Amico (deceased 2020) and Michael Sarno, law enforcement sources said," the Chicago Sun-Times wrote on September 11, 2007. On September 30, 2007, the Chicago Tribune reported that law enforcement sources indicated that Andriacchi controls Chicago's north side and north suburbs, and that he leads the Elmwood Park crew.

The FBI considers Andriacchi a prime suspect in the 2006 disappearance and presumed murder of Anthony Zizzo, and offered a $10,000 reward in 2016 for information that would help to solve the crime.

== Personal life and death ==
Andriacchi was a cousin by marriage to Joey "The Clown" Lombardo. Andriacchi and his late wife, Silvana Venditti-Andriacchi, lived in River Forest, Illinois. He died in Elmwood Park, Illinois on August 10, 2024, at the age of 91.
