= Louis Marino =

American mobster (1933–2017)

- Marino's 1990 mugshot
- Born: Louis T. Marino; March 14, 1933; Chicago, Illinois, U.S.
- Died: March 7, 2017 (aged 83); Chicago, Illinois, U.S.
- Other name: "Louie Tomatoes"
- Occupation: Mobster
- Allegiance: Chicago Outfit
- Conviction: Racketeering (1992)
- Penalty: 28 years' imprisonment (1993)

Louis Marino (March 14, 1933 – March 7, 2017) was an American mobster and member of the Chicago Outfit crime family. Marino oversaw the Outfit's rackets in Lake and McHenry counties north of Chicago. In 1993, he was sentenced to 28 years in prison for racketeering.

== Early life ==
Marino once worked for the Chicago-based Anthony Marano Company, a fruit and vegetable wholesaler.

== Chicago Outfit career ==
Marino joined the Cicero, Illinois faction of the Chicago Outfit and was one half of an enforcer duo along with his best friend, Salvatore "Solly D" DeLaurentis, during the 1970s and 1980s. Marino and DeLaurentis were allegedly involved in a number of gangland murders. During the 1980s, he was a member of the "Good Ship Lollipop" crew headed by Ernest Rocco Infelise. Marino was identified in a July 1986 Chicago Tribune article as an enforcer and driver for Infelise. In September 1986, Marino was identified as being a lieutenant of Chicago Outfit boss Joseph Ferriola, and as being recently elevated to be boss of the Outfit's gambling operation in McHenry County, Illinois.

Also, in September 1986, Marino sued the FBI for allegedly stealing his car while he left home for the Independence Day weekend. Marino had left his Chrysler Fifth Avenue for the weekend at his brother's house in Cicero, Illinois, and the FBI was alleged to have stolen his car and replaced it with a different Fifth Avenue. Marino returned earlier than expected and noticed the switch. The FBI returned the vehicle after Marino reported the theft to police. Marino claimed that, after the car was returned, he noticed holes in it, suggesting that either the FBI had planted and removed listening devices from the car or intended to place listening devices in the car.

On February 7, 1990, Marino was indicted in federal court in Chicago on racketeering charges in a sweeping indictment of mobsters. On February 15, 1990, he was ordered held without bond. He was later allowed house arrest and was released on bond to his house in Palos Park, Illinois. Several months later, Marino informed the court that he was working as a clerk at an archery range in Berwyn, Illinois. His defense attorney was former United States District Judge George N. Leighton.

On March 10, 1992, Marino was convicted of racketeering, income tax violations, and participating in an illegal gambling business. Nevertheless, he was acquitted of murder-conspiracy in the 1985 killing of bookmaker Hal Smith. During the trial, prosecutors alleged that Marino had hung a gambler over a balcony at the Chicago Board of Trade when the gambler failed to pay a debt.

On August 19, 1993, Marino was sentenced by United States District Judge Ann Claire Williams to 28 years in federal prison—the maximum sentence allowed. Marino served his sentence in the federal prison in Milan, Michigan.

Marino was identified in court during the "Family Secrets" mob trial in Chicago in 2007 by Chicago Outfit turncoat Nicholas Calabrese as having been one of several mobsters in the room during the fatal 1986 beatings of Chicago mobsters Anthony Spilotro and Michael Spilotro, whose murders were fictionalized in the 1995 film Casino. Marino has never been charged with the Spilotros' murders; however, the only person ever convicted of participating in the murders is imprisoned Chicago mob boss James Marcello.

Marino was released from federal custody on October 31, 2014.

== Family ==
Marino's son, Dino Marino, pleaded guilty in January 2000 to bilking the town of Cicero, Illinois, out of more than $130,000 as a ghost-payroller in the town's health department. Marino was later sentenced to a year in federal prison and was released on May 29, 2001.

== Death ==
Marino died of natural causes on March 7, 2017, at the age of 83.
