= Chicago Outfit =

Italian-American organized crime syndicate based in Chicago, Illinois

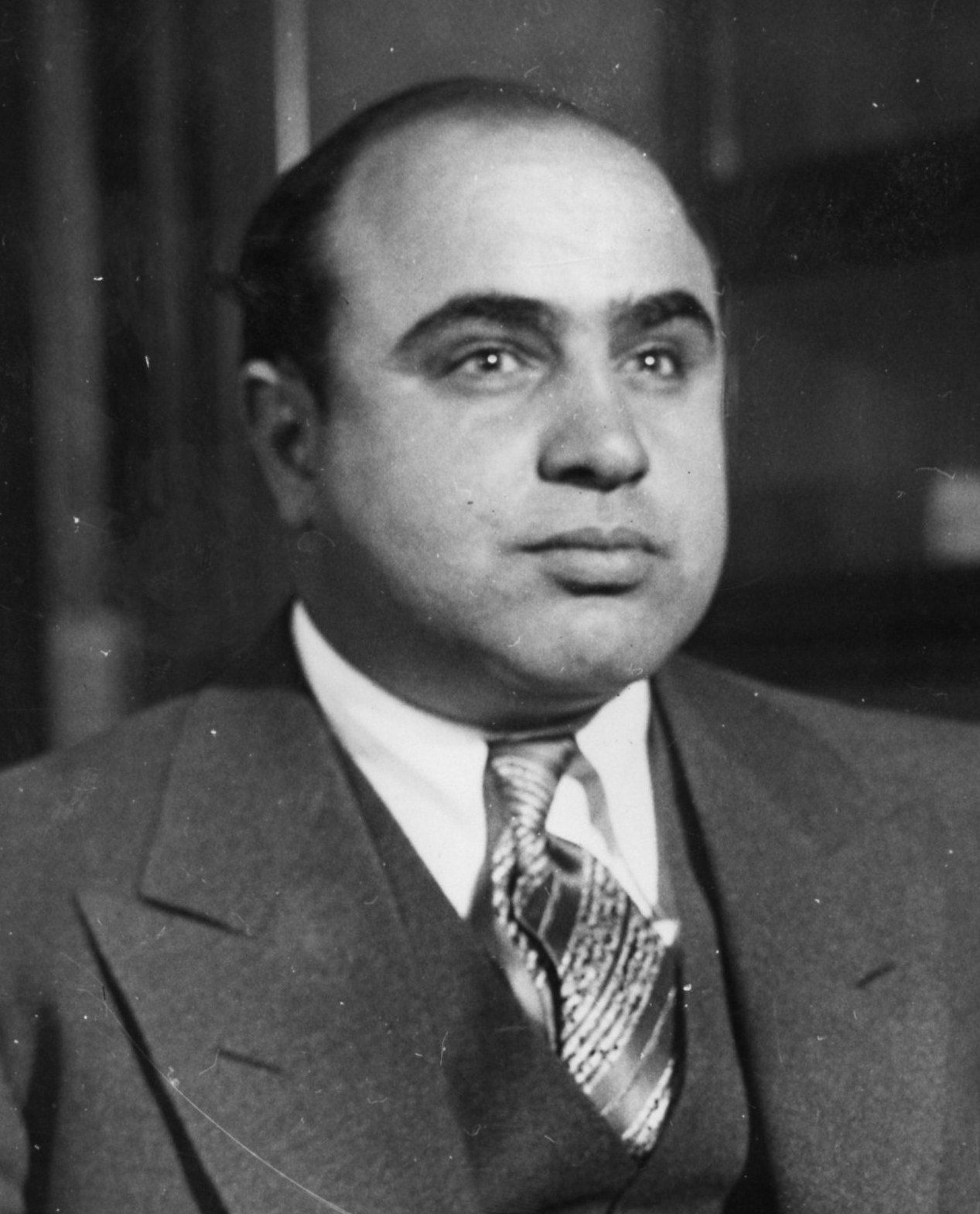
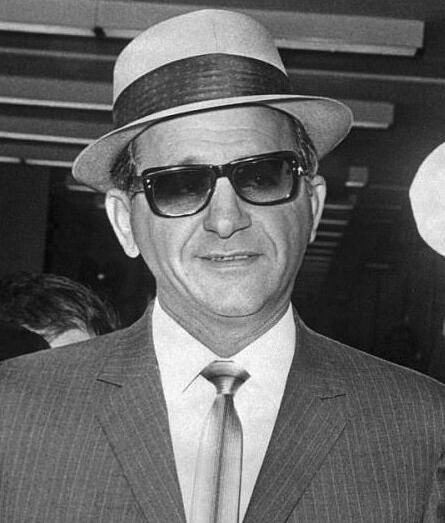
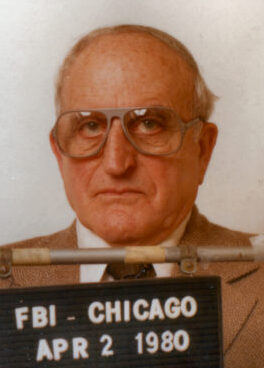
- Al Capone Sam Giancana Joey Aiuppa
- Founded: c. 1910; 116 years ago
- Founder: Big Jim Colosimo
- Founding location: Chicago, Illinois, United States
- Years active: c. 1910–present
- Territory: Primarily the Chicago metropolitan area, with additional territory throughout the surrounding Midwest, as well as Las Vegas, Phoenix, South Florida and Southern California
- Ethnicity: Italians as "made men" and other ethnicities as associates
- Membership (est.): 300 made members (1960); 200+ made members (1970); 28 made members and 100+ associates (2007)
- Activities: Racketeering, gambling, loansharking, extortion, labor racketeering, police and political corruption, drug trafficking, bootlegging, hijacking, burglary, auto theft, fencing, fraud, money laundering, bribery, prostitution, pornography, assault, torture, and murder
- Allies: Buffalo crime family; Cleveland crime family; Denver crime family; Detroit Partnership; Five Families; Genna crime family; Kansas City crime family; Los Angeles crime family; Milwaukee crime family; New Orleans crime family; Patriarca crime family; Rockford crime family; San Francisco crime family; St. Louis crime family; 12th Street Players; Aryan Brotherhood; C-Notes; Dixie Mafia; Forty-Two Gang; Nucky Johnson's Organization; Outlaws MC
- Rivals: North Side Gang; and various other gangs in the Chicago area

The Chicago Outfit, also known as the Outfit, the Chicago Mafia, the Chicago Mob, the Chicago crime family, the South Side Gang or the Organization, is an Italian American Mafia crime family based in Chicago, Illinois, and throughout the Greater Chicago area, originating in the city's South Side in the early 1910s.

The Outfit rose to power in the 1920s under the control of Johnny Torrio and Al Capone, and the period was marked by bloody gang wars for control of the distribution of illegal alcohol during Prohibition. The Outfit's power was solidified by Capone's leadership, consolidating the family into the larger American Mafia. Since then, the Outfit has been involved in a wide range of criminal activities, including loansharking, illegal gambling, prostitution, extortion, political corruption and murder. Capone was convicted of income tax evasion in 1931 and the Outfit was next run by Paul Ricca. Ricca and Tony Accardo shared power from 1943 until Ricca's death in 1972; Accardo became the sole power in the Outfit upon Ricca's death and was one of the longest-sitting bosses of all time upon his death in 1992. The family's longest-serving "Official" boss was Joey Aiuppa, serving from 1971 until 1986, though he reportedly cleared all highest-level decisions through Anthony Accardo, as official Consigliere.

Although it has never had a complete monopoly on organized crime in Chicago, the Outfit has long been the largest, most powerful and most violent criminal organization in Chicago and the Midwest in general. The organization is considered one of the most violent Mafia families in the United States, having committed over 1,000 murders since the 1920s. Unlike other Mafia factions such as the Five Families of New York City, the Outfit has been a unified faction since its conception. Its influence at its peak stretched as far as California, Florida and Nevada and it continues to operate throughout the Midwestern United States and South Florida, as well as Las Vegas and other parts of the Southwestern United States. Heightened law enforcement attention and general attrition have led to its gradual decline since the late 20th century, though it continues to be one of the major and most active organized crime groups in the Chicago metropolitan area and the Midwest.

== History ==
=== Origins ===
The early years of organized crime in Chicago, in the late 19th and early 20th centuries, were marked by the division of various street gangs controlling the South Side and North Side, as well as the Black Hand organizations of Little Italy. In later years, the Outfit consisted of various street crews controlling different territories around Chicago including Elmwood Park, Melrose Park, Chicago Heights, Rush Street, Grand Avenue and Chinatown.

Vincenzo "Big Jim" Colosimo centralized control in the early 20th century. Colosimo was born in Calabria, Italy, in 1878, and immigrated to Chicago in 1895, where he established himself as a criminal. By 1909, with the help of bringing Johnny Torrio from New York to Chicago, he was successful enough that he was encroaching on the criminal activity of the Black Hand organization. Colosimo also "cultivated deep political connections" after "serving as a precinct captain in the organization of First Ward Alderman Couglin and Kenna, and later [became] the bagman (collector of illegal profits and dispenser of bribes) in the vice-laden Levee District, which afforded him with blanket political protection".

=== Prohibition and Johnny Torrio ===
When Prohibition went into effect in 1920, Torrio pushed for the gang to enter into bootlegging, but Colosimo stubbornly refused. In March 1920, Colosimo secured an uncontested divorce from his wife, Victoria Moresco. A month later, he and singer Dale Winter eloped to West Baden Springs, Indiana. Upon their return, he bought a home on the South Side. On May 11, 1920, Colosimo was killed by a gunman waiting in the coat room of his restaurant, Colosimo's cafe. The killer was most likely Frankie Yale, fulfilling a contract commissioned by Johnny Torrio.

Torrio's organization was made up predominantly of ethnic Italians but had a large contingent of members from other immigrant backgrounds. Torrio's gang also differed from the other Chicago gangs by recruiting from New York's underworld, regularly welcoming that city's ambitious criminals into his organization's ranks. Alphonse "Scarface Al" Capone had left New York for Chicago in 1919, likely under orders from mob boss Frankie Yale to leave town to avoid retaliation for previous violence they had committed in New York. Capone began in Chicago as a doorman at the Four Deuces club. By 1924, Capone's business acumen and shrewd intelligence had gained him a place as Torrio's right-hand man. Many rivals saw Capone as responsible for the proliferation of brothels in the city.

In 1923, William Dever was elected mayor of Chicago, and he began to crack down on Torrio's underworld activities within the city. Losing their political cover, the gang looked to the suburbs for a new base of operations. Torrio ordered Capone to lead a takeover of the town of Cicero, where he was able to corrupt city manager Joseph Z. Klenha. The gang set up dozens of brothels, speakeasies, gambling dens, and other businesses within the town. On April 1, 1924, Cicero municipal elections were threatening Kenha's leadership. Kenha appealed to Torrio and Capone for their support, which they responded to by terrorizing the opposition and voting public on election day. The gang guarded polling places, ensuring people knew the right way to vote and violently preventing entry to those who did not. They ransacked the local Democratic party campaign headquarters, forcibly detaining the election workers for hours. By that afternoon, the Chicago Police Department was ordered to step in to halt the violence by Cook County Judge Edmund J. Jareki. Seventy plainclothes officers, newly deputized as county sheriffs, descended on Cicero. Frank Capone, Al's brother, was killed that evening by detective sergeant William Cusack during an altercation on 22nd Street and Cicero Avenue. Charles Fischetti was also arrested at the scene. Kenha won the election, ensuring the Torrio-Capone gang's local immunity into the 1930s.

Torrio was wary of being drawn into gang wars and tried to negotiate agreements over territory between rival crime groups. The smaller North Side Gang led by Dean O'Banion was of mixed ethnicity, and it came under pressure from the Genna brothers who were allied with Torrio. O'Banion found that Torrio was unhelpful with the encroachment of the Gennas into the North Side, despite his pretensions to be a settler of disputes. The "Terrible" Genna brothers, as they were known, consisted of Peter, James, Angelo, Tony, Sam and Mike "The Devil" Genna. They were known for their ruthlessness and intemperate disposition. In a fateful step, Torrio either arranged for or acquiesced to the murder of O'Banion at his flower shop on November 10, 1924. This placed Hymie Weiss at the head of the gang, backed by Vincent Drucci and Bugs Moran. Weiss had been a close friend of O'Banion and the North Siders made it a priority to get revenge on his killers.

At the end of 1924, the Torrio-Capone gang had between 300 and 400 members, while the North Side gang could count on around 200 soldiers.

=== Beer Wars and Al Capone ===
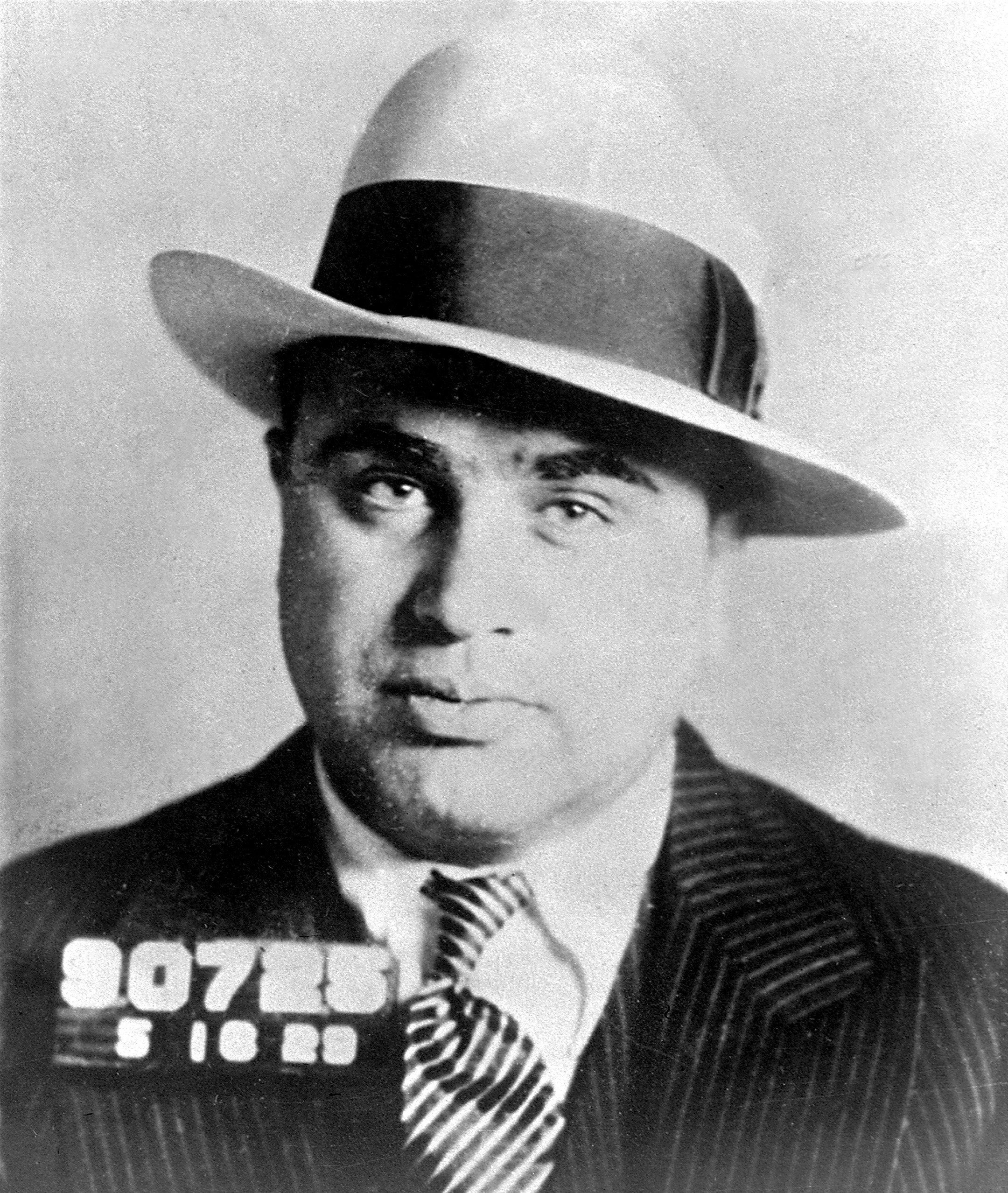
Mugshot of Al Capone in 1929

In early 1925, the North Side began a string of retaliations for O'Banion's murder. First, in January 1925, Capone's car was shot up without him in it. Twelve days later, on January 24, Torrio was returning from a shopping trip with his wife Anna, when he was shot several times by North Side gunmen. After recovering, he effectively resigned and handed control to Capone, age 26 at the time. Torrio retired to New York and acted as an advisor to the New York Mafia in helping form the "Commission".

During the beer wars, the Capone gang's enforcement group was led by "Machine Gun" Jack McGurn, and included Tony Capezio, Claude "Screwy" Maddox, Sam "Golf Bag" Hunt, Frank Rio, and others. 1925–1926 were the most violent years of Chicago's "Beer Wars" in which 133 gangsters were murdered. On September 20, 1926, the North Side gang attacked Capone's headquarters at Cicero's Hawthorne Hotel, shooting hundreds of rounds and only narrowly missing Capone. Less than a month later, on October 11, North Side gang leader Hymie Weiss was gunned down with a Thompson in front of Holy Name Cathedral, allegedly by Jack McGurn. Weiss was succeeded by Vincent Drucci, a WW1 veteran and close friend of Weiss.

In 1928, the Capone gang was active in the violent Pineapple Primary election. Capone had previously donated $200,000 to Big Bill Thompson's corrupt mayoral campaign, and then used his gangsters to intimidate, assault, and bomb Thompson's political rivals in an attempt to keep the Republican party in power.

Capone was widely assumed to have been responsible for ordering the Saint Valentine's Day Massacre in an attempt to eliminate Bugs Moran, head of the North Side Gang. On the morning of February 14, 1929, four Capone henchmen (two dressed as Chicago policemen) entered the S.M.C Cartage Company garage located at 2122 N. Clark St. Chicago, Illinois, to find seven men, which included five of Moran's soldiers, an auto mechanic, and a friend of the gangsters, awaiting a shipment of hijacked booze. All seven men were lined up against the wall in a mock police raid and shot to death. Moran escaped narrowly by accidentally arriving late to the meeting. Moran was the last survivor of the North Side gunmen; his succession had come about because his similarly aggressive predecessors Vincent Drucci and Hymie Weiss had been killed in the violence that followed the murder of original leader Dean O'Banion.

Capone was convicted on three counts of income tax evasion on October 17, 1931, and was sentenced a week later to 11 years in federal prison, fined $50,000 plus $7,692 for court costs, and was held liable for $215,000 plus interest due on his back taxes. Capone later died of heart failure as a result of apoplexy on January 25, 1947.

=== From Nitti to Accardo ===
==== 1930s–1950s ====
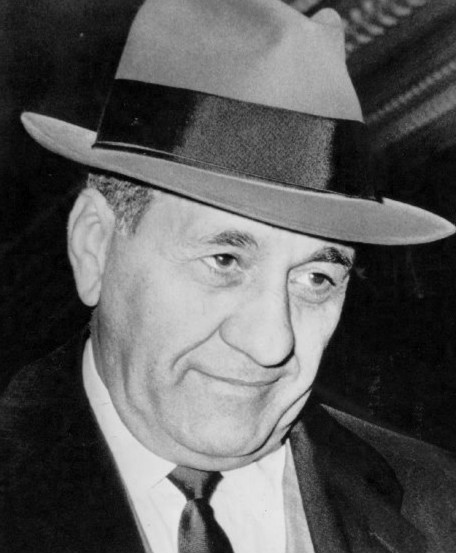
Tony Accardo in 1960

In 1931, head of operations Frank Nitti was also convicted of tax evasion and sent to prison; however, Nitti received an 18-month sentence. When Nitti was released on March 25, 1932, he took his place as the new boss of the Capone Gang. However, some historical revisionists claim that the real power in the Outfit was his underboss, Paul Ricca. Not only did Ricca frequently overrule Nitti's orders, but the leaders of the National Crime Syndicate dealt solely with him. Ricca would be the crime boss of Chicago, either in name or in fact, for the next 40 years.

Over the next decade, The Outfit moved into labor racketeering, gambling, and loan sharking. Geographically, this was the period when Outfit muscle extended to Milwaukee and Madison, Wisconsin, Kansas City, and especially to Hollywood and other California cities, where the Outfit's extortion of labor unions gave it leverage over the motion picture industry.

In the early 1940s, a handful of top Outfit leaders went to prison because they were found to be extorting Hollywood by controlling the unions that compose Hollywood's movie industry, and manipulating and misusing the Teamsters Central States pension fund. In 1943, the Outfit was caught red-handed shaking down the Hollywood movie industry. Ricca wanted Nitti to take the fall. However, Nitti had found that he was claustrophobic, years earlier during his incarceration for tax evasion, and decided to end his own life rather than face a protracted incarceration under much more severe conditions for extortion. Ricca then became the boss in name as well as in fact, with enforcement chief Anthony "Joe Batters" Accardo as underboss—the start of a partnership that lasted for almost 30 years. Around this time, the Outfit began bringing in members of the Forty-Two Gang, a notoriously violent youth gang. Among them were Sam "Momo" Giancana, Sam "Mad Sam" DeStefano, Felix "Milwaukee Phil" Alderisio, and Fiore "Fifi" Buccieri.

In the late 1940s the Outfit began to make connections with Jimmy Hoffa and the International Brotherhood of Teamsters union. Outfit associate Paul Dorfman, described by the McClellan Committee as "the contact man between dishonest union leaders and members of the Chicago Underworld", began making introductions. It was through Dorfman that Hoffa began to establish relationships with Chicago organized crime. He introduced Hoffa to former Capone associates like Joseph Glimco and Paul Ricca. In 1949 Dorfman introduced Hoffa to his stepson Allen Dorfman, who became heavily involved in Teamsters corruption. According to FBI files, Dorfman agreed to introduce Hoffa to mob figures in exchange for Allen's entry into the Teamsters' insurance business.

Ricca was sent to prison later in 1943 for his part in The Outfit plot to control Hollywood. He was sentenced to 10 years in prison, along with a number of other mobsters. Through the "magic" of political connections, the whole group of Outfit mobsters was released after three years, largely due to the efforts of Outfit "fixer" Murray "the Camel" Humphreys. Ricca could not associate with mobsters as a condition of his parole. Accardo nominally took power as boss, but actually shared power with Ricca, who continued behind the scenes as a senior consultant—one of the few instances of shared power in organized crime.

Accardo joined Ricca in semi-retirement in 1957 due to some "heat" that he was getting from the IRS. From then on, Ricca and Accardo allowed several others to nominally serve as boss, such as Giancana, Alderisio, Joseph "Joey Doves" Aiuppa, William "Willie Potatoes" Daddano, and Jackie "the Lackey" Cerone. Most of the front bosses originated from the Forty-Two Gang. However, no major business transactions took place without Ricca and Accardo's knowledge and approval, and certainly no "hits". By staying behind the scenes, Ricca and Accardo lasted far longer than Capone. Ricca died in 1972, leaving Accardo as the sole power behind the scenes.

==== 1960s–1990s ====
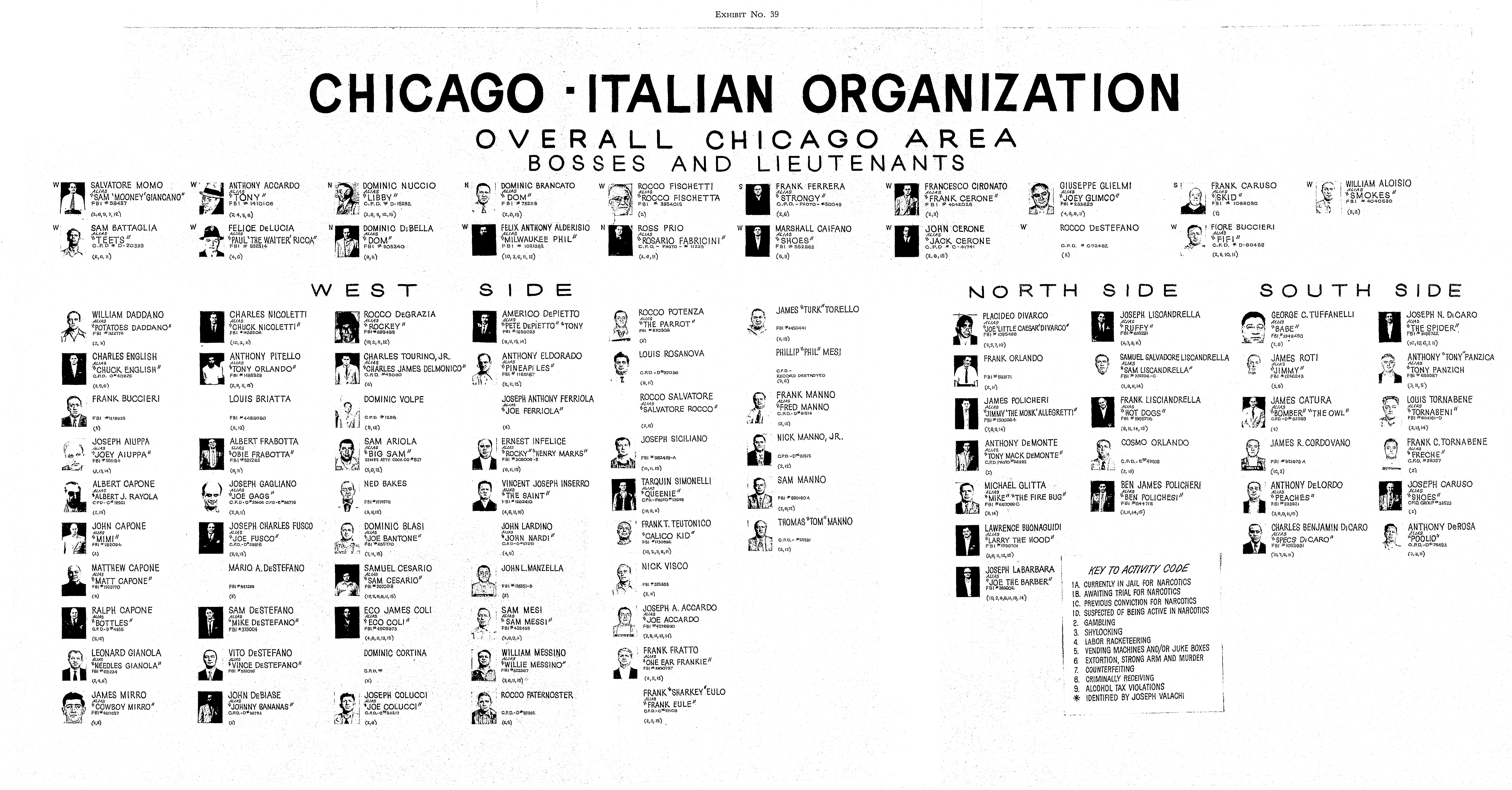
FBI chart of the Chicago Outfit hierarchy in 1963

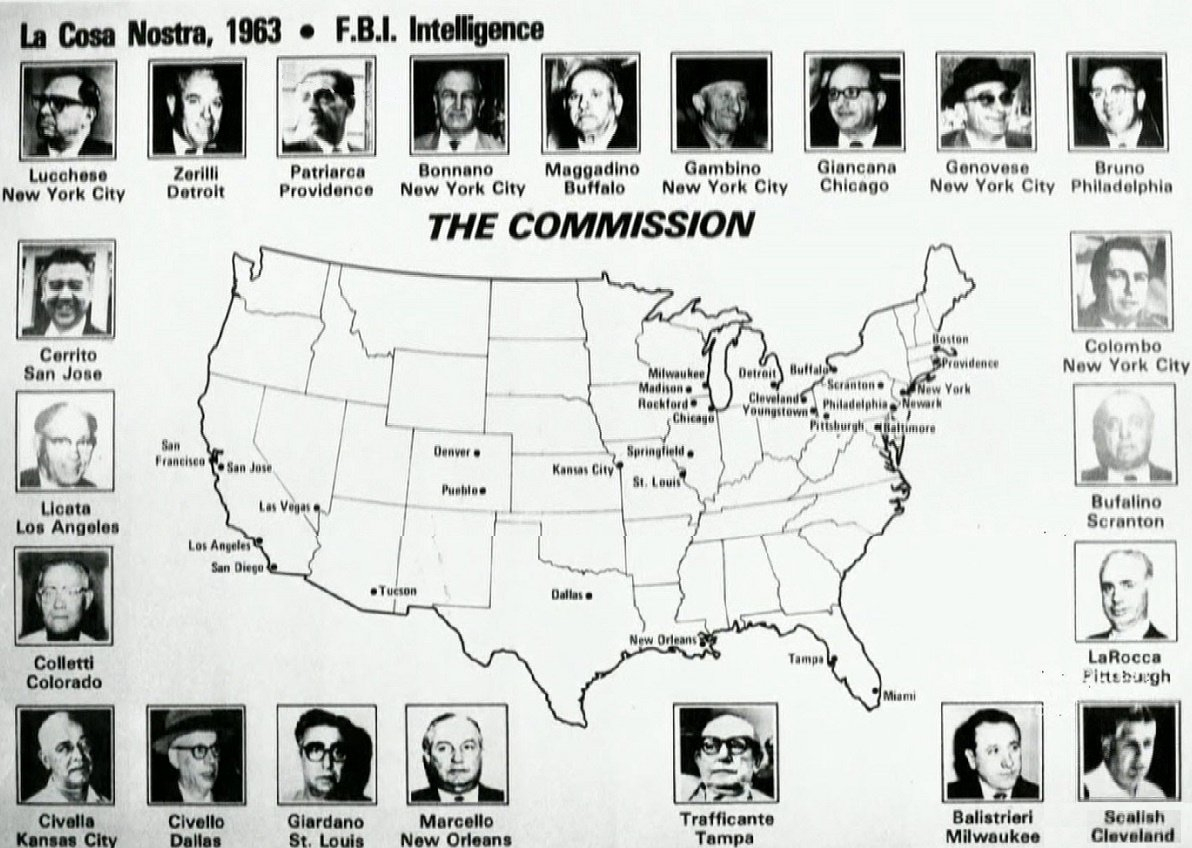
1963 FBI La Cosa Nostra Commission chart

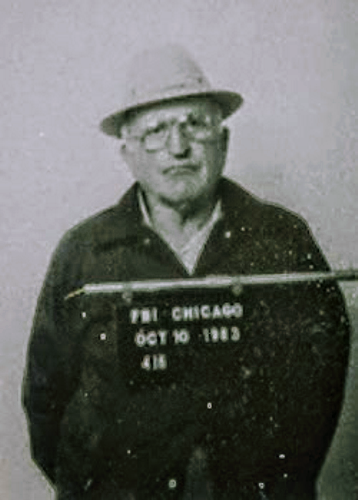
FBI mugshot of Joey Aiuppa in 1983

Some have argued that boss Sam Giancana and the Outfit "played a role" in Kennedy's victory in the 1960 United States presidential election in Illinois. Giancana's mistress Judith Exner and Frank Sinatra's daughter Tina Sinatra both stated that Giancana used his connections to persuade unions to support Kennedy. According to Exner, Giancana bragged to her that Kennedy would never have been elected without him. However, it is alleged that Giancana came to regret aiding Kennedy get elected due to the fact that attorney general Robert F. Kennedy made significant efforts to crack down on organized crime. The lawyer Robert J. McDonnell, who became the son-in-law of Giancana, told journalist Seymour Hersh that at the request of judge William J. Tuohy he helped set up a meeting between Joseph P. Kennedy Sr. and Giancana. Sinatra's daughter Tina told Hersh a similar story, that through her father Kennedy set up a meeting with Giancana.

Frank Ragano, lawyer for Florida mob boss Santo Trafficante Jr., stated that Giancana complained to his client that "We broke our balls for him and gave him the election, and he gets his brother to hound us to death". In the book Double Cross by Chuck Giancana, the half-brother of Giancana claimed Giancana said “I help get Jack elected and, in return, he calls off the heat".

The Outfit reached the height of its power in the early 1960s. Accardo used the Teamsters pension fund, with the aid of Meyer Lansky, Sidney Korshak, and Jimmy Hoffa, to engage in massive money laundering through the Outfit's casinos. The Outfit controlled casinos in Las Vegas and "skimmed" millions of dollars over the course of several decades. Most recently, top mob figures have been found guilty of crimes dating back to as early as the mid-1960s. It has been rumored that the $2 million skimmed from the casinos in the Court case of 1986 was used to build the Old Neighborhood Italian American Club, the founder of which was Angelo J. "The Hook" LaPietra. The 1995 Martin Scorsese movie Casino depicts The Outfit's activities in Las Vegas during the 1970s, where bookmaker Frank "Lefty" Rosenthal and made man Anthony "The Ant" Spilotro managed the Stardust, Fremont, Marina, and Hacienda casinos on behalf of Joey "Doves" Aiuppa.

The 1970s and 1980s were a hard time for the Outfit, as law enforcement continued to penetrate the organization, spurred by poll-watching politicians. Off-track betting reduced bookmaking profits, and illicit casinos withered under competition from legitimate casinos. Activities such as auto theft and professional sports betting did not replace the lost profits. In the 1970s and early 1980s, a series of over 20 murders resulted from the Outfit's takeover of car theft rackets on the South Side of Chicago and Northwest Indiana. During this period, known as the "chop shop wars", James "Jimmy the Bomber" Cataura, the head of the Chicago Heights crew, was tasked by Outfit leaders with seizing control of auto theft operations from a vast network of independent car thieves in the Chicago area. Cataura himself was a victim of the "chop shop wars" when he was killed in July 1978 amidst a power struggle within his own crew with underling Albert Tocco for control of the lucrative stolen car rings. The Outfit simultaneously waged a campaign to gain control over independent pornographic bookstores, massage parlors and strip clubs in and around Chicago, with several gangland-style murders being attributed to the "porn wars". Beginning in 1977, the Outfit engaged in a "loose alliance" with the Outlaws Motorcycle Club to control and share the profits from organized prostitution in Chicago.

Allen Dorfman, a key figure in the Outfit's money embezzlement operations, was investigated by the Department of Justice. In 1982, the FBI wire-tapped Dorfman's personal and company phone lines and was able to gather the evidence needed to convict Dorfman and several of his associates on attempts to bribe a U.S. senator to get rid of the trucking industry rates. If Dorfman had succeeded, the Outfit would have seen a huge gain of profit. This was known as Operation Pendorf and was a huge blow to the Chicago crime syndicate.

Operation GAMBAT (GAMBling ATtorney) proved to be a crippling blow to the Outfit's tight grip on the Chicago political machine. Pat Marcy, a made man in the Outfit, ran the city's First Ward, which represented most of downtown Chicago. Marcy and company controlled the circuit courts from the 1950s until the late 1980s with the help of Alderman Fred Roti and Democratic Committeeman John D'Arco Sr. Together, the First Ward fixed cases involving everything from minor traffic violations to murder.

Attorney and First Ward associate Robert Cooley was one of the lawyers who represented many mafiosi and associates in which cases were fixed. As a trusted man within the First Ward, Cooley was asked to "take out" a city police officer. Cooley was also an addicted gambler and in debt, so he approached the U.S. Justice Department's Organized Crime Strike Force, declaring that he wanted to "destroy Marcy and the First Ward".

Cooley was soon in touch with the FBI and began cooperating as a federal informant. Through the years, he maintained close ties to Marcy and the big shots of the First Ward. He wore an electronic surveillance device, recording valuable conversations at the notorious "First Ward Table", located at "Counselor's Row" across the street from Chicago City Hall. The results in Operation Gambat (Gambling Attorney) were convictions of 24 corrupt judges, lawyers, and cops.

In February 1990, 20 members and associates of the Outfit's "Ferriola Street Crew", which was headed by Joseph Ferriola before being taken over by Ernest Rocco Infelice upon Ferriola's death, were indicted on various federal charges including murder, extortion and bribery following an eight-year FBI investigation.

Accardo died in 1992. In a measure of how successfully he had managed to stay out of the limelight, he never spent a day in jail (or only spent one day, depending on the source) despite an arrest record dating to 1922. Chicago's transition from Accardo to the next generation of Outfit bosses has been more of an administrative change than a power struggle, distinct from the way that organized crime leadership transitions take place in New York City.

=== 21st century ===
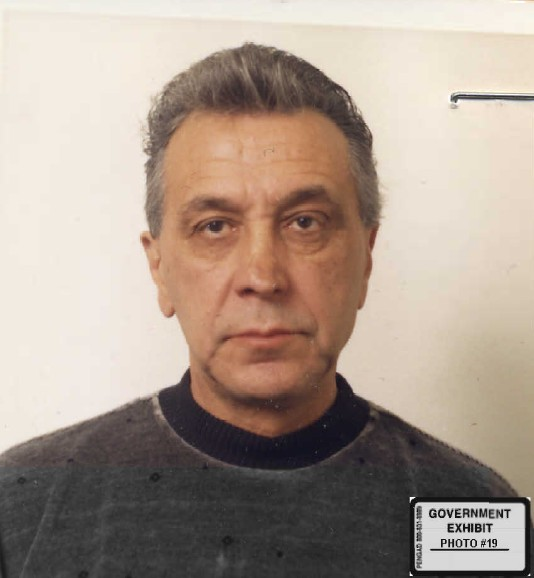
John DiFronzo

Higher law enforcement investigations and general attrition led to the Outfit's gradual decline since the late 20th century. The Old Neighborhood Italian American Club is considered to be the hangout of old timers as they live out their golden years. The club's founder was Angelo J. LaPietra "The Hook", who was the main Council at the time of his death in 1999.

On April 25, 2005, the U.S. Department of Justice launched Operation Family Secrets, which indicted 14 Outfit members and associates under the Racketeer Influenced and Corrupt Organizations Act (RICO), including Joseph Lombardo, Nicholas Calabrese, Frank Calabrese Sr. and James Marcello. U.S. District Court Judge James Zagel presided over the Family Secrets trial. The federal prosecutors were Mitchell A. Mars, T. Markus Funk, and John Scully. Facing a life sentence, Nicholas Calabrese became the first "made" member of the Chicago Outfit to become a witness for the federal government. Calabrese gave information on 14 murders he was personally involved with and knowledge of 22 killings during the past 30 years.

As of 2007, the Outfit's size is estimated to be 28 official members (composing its core group) and more than 100 associates.

From 1996 to 2018, the Chicago Outfit was believed to be led by John DiFronzo. As of 2021, the Chicago Outfit is believed to be led by Salvatore "Solly D" DeLaurentis. On May 31, 2020, 24 year-old Bobby 'Boo Boo' English Jr. was murdered. The Cicero crew-affiliated 12th Street Players gang is suspected of ordering the hit. He was the son of Bobby "Taz" English, former boss of the 12th Street Players during the 1990s and early 2000s and currently in prison for attempted murder.

In May 2026, reputed soldier Filippo 'Gigi' Rovito and several Greek-American associates were arrested and charged with being involved in a gambling ring.

== Historical leadership ==
=== Boss (official and acting) ===
- 1910–1920—Vincenzo "Big Jim" Colosimo—murdered on May 11, 1920
- 1920–1925—John "Papa Johnny" Torrio—resigned after an assassination attempt
- 1925–1932—Alphonse "Scarface Al" Capone—imprisoned in 1931
- 1932–1947—Paul "the Waiter" Ricca—imprisoned 1943–1947; became consigliere
  - Acting 1943–1947—Anthony "Joe Batters" Accardo—became official boss
- 1947–1992—Anthony "Joe Batters" Accardo—stepped down in 1957, becoming a "shadow executive" and consigliere of the Outfit while retaining ultimate authority over a series of front bosses along with Paul Ricca; died on May 22, 1992
- 1992–2018—John "No Nose" DiFronzo—imprisoned 1993–1994; died on May 27, 2018
  - Acting 1993–1994—John "Johnny Apes" Monteleone
  - Acting 2005–2010—Michael "Fat Mike" Sarno
  - Acting 2010–2018—Salvatore "Solly D" Delaurentis
- 2018–present—Salvatore "Solly D" Delaurentis

=== Street boss (front boss) ===
The street boss is a high-ranking member appointed to run the outfit's daily activities for the boss. The position was created to protect the boss from federal investigations.

- 1931–1943—Frank "the Enforcer" Nitti—committed suicide on March 19, 1943
- 1957–1966—Salvatore "Sam Mooney" Giancana—fled to Mexico to avoid imprisonment; deposed by Ricca and Accardo
- 1966–1967—Salvatore "Teets" Battaglia—imprisoned
- 1967–1969—John "Jackie the Lackey" Cerone—became underboss
- 1969–1971—Felix "Milwaukee Phil" Alderisio—imprisoned 1967–1969; died on September 25, 1971
- 1971–1986—Joseph "Joey Doves" Aiuppa—imprisoned
- 1986–1989—Joseph "Joe Nagall" Ferriola—died on March 11, 1989
- 1989–1993—Samuel "Sam Wings" Carlisi—imprisoned
- 1993–1994—Joseph "Joe the Builder" Andriacchi—resigned
- 2001–2003—Alfonso "Al the Pizza Man" Tornabene—resigned
- 2003–2009—James "Jimmy the Man" Marcello—imprisoned
- 2012–2016—Louis "Louie Tomatoes" Marino—resigned; died on March 7, 2017
- 2016–present—Albert "Little Guy" Vena

=== Underboss (official and acting) ===
- 1910–1920—John "Papa Johnny" Torrio—became boss
- 1920–1925—Alphonse "Scarface Al" Capone—became boss
- 1925–1931—Frank "the Enforcer" Nitti—became front boss
- 1931–1943—Louis "Little New York" Campagna—imprisoned; died on May 31, 1955
- 1943–1947—Tony "Joe Batters" Accardo—became boss
- 1947–1957—Salvatore "Mooney Sam" Giancana—became front boss
- 1957–1964—Frank "Strongy" Ferraro—died on August 24, 1964
- 1964–1966—Salvatore "Teets" Battaglia – became front boss
- 1967–1986—John "Jackie the Lackey" Cerone—imprisoned
- 1986–1992—John "No Nose" DiFronzo—became boss
- 1992–1996—James "Jimmy the Man" Marcello—imprisoned
- 1996–2006—Anthony "Little Tony" Zizzo—disappeared on August 31, 2006
- 2006–2009—Joseph "Joe the Builder" Andriacchi—resigned
- 2009–2020—Salvatore "Sammy Cards" Cataudella—became acting underboss
- 2020–2023—James "Jimmy I" Inendino—died on February 23, 2023.
  - Acting 2020–2023—Salvatore "Sammy Cards" Cataudella – became official underboss
- 2023–present—Salvatore "Sammy Cards" Cataudella

=== Consigliere (official and acting) ===
- 1925–1928—Antonio "Tony the Scourge" Lombardo—murdered on September 7, 1928
- 1928–1947—Charles "Trigger Happy" Fischetti—resigned
- 1947–1957—Paul "the Waiter" Ricca—resigned
- 1957–1992—Tony "Joe Batters" Accardo—died on May 22, 1992
- 1992–1999—Angelo "the Hook" LaPietra—died on March 28, 1999
- 1999–2007—Joseph "Joey the Clown" Lombardo—sentenced in 2007 and imprisoned in 2009; died on October 19, 2019
- 2007–2009—Alfonso "Al the Pizza Man" Tornabene—died on May 17, 2009
- 2009–2020—Marco "the Mover" D'Amico—became semi-active in 2016, allowing Andriacchi to assist DeLaurentis; died on April 22, 2020
  - Acting 2012–2016—Joseph "Joe the Builder" Andriacchi
- 2020–2024—Joseph "Joe the Builder" Andriacchi—died on August 10, 2024
  - Acting 2022–present—John A. Matassa

== Current members ==
=== Administration ===
- Boss—Salvatore "Solly D" DeLaurentis—born in 1939. DeLaurentis was inducted into the Outfit in 1988 or 1989 and put in charge of rackets in Lake County, Illinois. He was indicted in 1993 along with Ernest "Rocky" Infelice, Louis "Louie Tomatoes" Marino, Robert "Bobby The Gabeet" Bellavia, Harry Aleman, Marco "The Mover" D'Amico, and several others, in the Good Ship Lollipop case, which centered on mob murders by the Cicero street crew, and sent to prison for 17 years. He was released in 2006. DeLaurentis then reportedly acted as a co-capo of the Cicero crew. He became acting boss of the Outfit in 2010 before taking over as official boss after the death of John DiFronzo in 2018.
- Street boss—Albert "Little Guy" Vena—born in 1948. Part of the new administration following the retirement of John DiFronzo. Vena was once a powerful capo of the Grand Avenue crew and replaced Joseph Lombardo after his 2007 conviction of a 1974 murder. By 2000, Vena had been acquitted of 2 murders. FBI investigators from the August 2006, disappearance case of Anthony Zizzo considered him a suspect. In 1993, Vena was acquitted of the November 4, 1992 murder of Samuel Taglia who was shot twice in the head and had his throat cut with a knife, his body dumped in the trunk of his 1983 Buick car. His most trusted confidants were reported to be Joseph Andriacchi and James Inendino.
- Underboss—Salvatore "Sammy Cards" Cataudella—former acting underboss; convicted of racketeering related to a prostitution scheme in 1990.
- Consigliere—Vacant
- Acting consigliere—John "Pudgy" Matassa Jr.—currently acting consigliere. Matassa took over the North Side/Rush Street Crew. In 2019, Matassa pleaded guilty in a scheme aimed at fraudulently qualifying for early retirement benefits.

=== Caporegimes ===
- Frank "Toots" Caruso—capo of the 26th Street/Chinatown crew.
- Rudolph "Rudy" Fratto—capo of the Elmwood Park crew; Peter DiFronzo was the captain before his death in December 2020. Rudy Fratto became Caporegime by 2021. Fratto was born in 1943. He was first identified as a member of the Outfit in 1997. In October 2009, he pleaded guilty to tax evasion. In September 2012, he was sentenced to 1-year imprisonment for bid-rigging $2 million in forklift contracts for a pair of trade shows at McCormick Place. Theories have arisen that he and Michael "Mags" Magnafichi have been running the crew jointly as co-capos, though sources dispute this as Magnafichi has reportedly not been active in years.
- Louis "Louie" Rainone—capo of the Cicero crew. In 2012, Rainone's business the Roosevelt Gold Exchange was robbed by five suspects.
- Christopher "Christy the Nose" Spina—capo of the Grand Avenue crew. Spina was a long time member of the Grand Avenue crew and a close associate of Albert Vena. He was also the driver of Joey Lombardo and at one time he worked for Chicago's Bureau of Signs and Markings. In 1993, Spina lost his foreman job at the First Ward sanitation yard when the City of Chicago stated he was chauffeuring Joseph Lombardo around.

=== Soldiers ===
- Robert Abbinanti—Elmwood Park crew soldier; born in October 1955. In May 1995, Abbinanti pleaded guilty to charges of racketeering, gambling, and conspiracy, and in July 1995, Abbinanti was sentenced to 5 years in prison for using a weapon during a botched robbery, he was also sentenced to over 1 1/2 years for the other offenses to run consecutively.
- Robert Bellavia—former member of the Ferriola crew. He was involved in the February 7, 1985 murder of bookmaker Hal C. Smith, the body was recovered 3 days later in the trunk of his car. In 1990, he was indicted and later convicted in the Good Ship Lollipop case, a large-scale racketeering and murder indictment alongside Ernest Infelice, Solly DeLaurentis, Harry Aleman, James Nicholas and William DiDomenico. He was released in 2016 after serving 25 years in prison.
- Paul "Paulie C" Carparelli—Cicero crew soldier; born in September 1968. Caparelli is former member of the 12th Street Players gang. In February 2016, Carparelli was sentenced to over 3 years in prison by U.S. District Judge Sharon Johnson Coleman for a series of extortion conspiracies within Chicago, Wisconsin, New Jersey and Las Vegas.
- Michael Carioscia—soldier; born 1933. In December 1950, he was arrested on charges of armed robbery and was sentenced to 2 years' imprisonment, he was released in 1954. He was sentenced to 5 years imprisonment in October 1961 on narcotics charges after he and Armando Pennacchio made three sales of a large quantity of heroin to an undercover FBN officer. He has a brother named Frank.
- Frank Caruso Jr.—soldier. Son of 26th Street crew capo Frank "Toots" Caruso was arrested for beating a black boy in 1998.
- Dominick "Mennie" Cassano—Elmwood Park crew soldier and brother of Gino "Mean Gene" Cassano and Angelo "The Angel" Cassano (deceased). He and his brothers were convicted of attempted murder in 1993.
- Gino "Mean Gene" Cassano—Elmwood Park crew soldier and brother of Dominick "Mennie" Cassano and Angelo "The Angel" Cassano (deceased). He and his brothers were convicted of attempted murder in 1993.
- Anthony "Tony" Dote—soldier; born in 1952. In November 1994, he was indicted on charges of racketeering and illegal gambling. He pleaded guilty to the charges in 1996 and was sentenced to 4 years imprisonment. In April 2000, Dote and 6 other Chicago mob affiliates were accused of operating a sports betting ring that netted $2 million over three years.
- Nicholas "Nick" Ferriola—soldier; born in 1977. He is the son of Joseph Ferriola. He was sentenced by U.S. District Judge James Zagel in 2008 to 3 years in federal prison for his role in the Family Secrets case, he was accused of extortion and illegal sports gambling charges over an 8-year period, Ferriola admitted to earning over $150,000 per month. He served as a trusted confidant to Frank Calabrese Sr. during the operation including after Calabrese's life imprisonment sentence in 2009.
- Gary "Gags" Gagliano—Elmwood Park crew soldier. Gagliano is the nephew of Joseph Gagliano, a close associate of Jackie Cerone.
- Michael "Jaws" Giorango—former associate of the Chicago Heights crew. He pleaded guilty to operating a bookmaking ring in the suburbs of South Chicago in 1989 and used threats of violence to collect unpaid debts including threats of beatings, bombings and robbery. In 1990, he was sentenced to prison and served 4 years. In 2010, reports linked him and Alexi Giannoulias, the 72nd Democratic Illinois treasurer, to a $11–20 million loan. In 2004, he was sentenced to six months of intermittent confinement and three years of probation for prostitution charges in Miami. He was granted early release from probation in 2008. In 2010, he filed for bankruptcy protection and listed assets and liabilities between $500,000 and $1 million. His case was dismissed in 2013.
- Nick "Jumbo" Guzzino—soldier; born in 1942. In around 1991, Guzzino was sentenced to 39-years imprisonment for racketeering and extortion.
- Dino Marino—Son of Louis "Louie Tomatoes" Marino and driver of Solly D. He was arrested for a no-show job as Health Department inspector for the Town of Cicero.
- John "Pudgy" Matassa—soldier and former capo; born in 1952. Matassa served as the secretary-treasurer of the Independent Union of Amalgamated Workers Local 711 in 2013. In February 2019, Matassa pleaded guilty to embezzlement. Matassa was sentenced to 6 months imprisonment and also ordered to pay $66,500 in restitution.
- Alphonse Mitria—Elmwood Park crew soldier; born in May 1949. In February 2001, Mitria was indicted for felony theft with an estimated $2 million in stolen merchandise, which included stolen toys, cigarettes, and designer clothing.
- Robert "Bobby Pinocchio" Panozzo Sr. (born on March 1, 1960) — current soldier. Panozzo was born in Chicago, and his family hailed from Veneto in Italy. By the late 1970s, Panozzo was a member in the C-Notes gang along with Paul Koroluk Sr. Panozzo may have begun his association to the Chicago Mafia by Albert Vena, also another C-Notes gang member, by the 1980s. By the late 1980s, Panozzo was heavily involved in burglary and drug trafficking. Panozzo was alleged to have murdered Lydia Minnici in December 1987 by repeatedly pushing Minnici down a flight of stairs, and may have died from a heart attack attributed to the attack from Panozzo, it alleged Minnici was killed by Panozzo as she had signed the deed of her apartment to Steven Brantner in October 1987, Brantner himself was later shot and killed in October 1991, with Panozzo whom discovered the body and drove him to the hospital. In February 1991, Panozzo was arrested for participating in a burglary ring which had operated since at least 1988, also arrested were Raymond Redisi and Robert Barker. By the early 1990s, Panozzo was associated with Albert Vena and Joseph Lombardo, serving as a money collector for Lombardo. In July 1998, Panozzo was arrested for disorderly conduct. In 2000, Panozzo was sentenced to 2 years for probation on weapon charges. Panozzo was possibly inducted into the Chicago Mafia during the 2000s. By 2005, Panozzo was involved in a loansharking operation and enlisted Joseph Abbott as a money collector on behalf of Panozzo, in one particular occasion, one debtor had owed Panozzo $100,000. In October 2006, he was sentenced to 7 years in prison for his role in a house burglary in December 2005, and with Abbott and himself gave a beating to a debtor over slow repayment, Panozzo was released in September 2008. In February 2009 and in April 2009, a debtor had his vehicle and home firebombed. In November 2010, Grand Avenue crew affiliate, Norberto Vélez, was shot and killed, and was connected to Vena and Panozzo in business deals. By the early 2010s, Panozzo was affiliated with the Spanish Cobras and the Latin Dragons, and reportedly, the gangs would identify drug dealers for Panozzo to and his associates to from, in particular heroin, cocaine and marijuana drug dealers, posing as police officers, Panozzo and his affiliates would commit around 5 or 6 robberies and home invasions per year. In July 2012, Panozzo, Vena, Michael Swiatek and Steven Mandell-Manning, were involved in an undercover FBI operation concerning the extortion of the Polekatz strip club which was being targeted by Anthony Quaranta and Demitri Stavropoulos, Chicago-Mafia Elmwood Park crew associates. In November 2012, Panozzo was involved in a residential burglary along with Paul Koroluk Sr., Max Abuhabsah and Jeff Hollingshead located on 3535 E. Goodenow in Will County, which cocaine was stolen from, Panozzo also took part in a home invasion located on 914 S. 55th Ct. in Cicero in April 2013, in around this time, Panozzo operated a prostitution business located on 800 block of West Superior Street, which was disguised as a massage parlour. In mid-2013, Panozzo participated in a home invasion, where cocaine and two vehicles were stolen, during this robbery, Panozzo sliced off one victim's ear after he pretended to not speak English. Hollingshead was arrested in October 2013 for home invasion and firearm charges, and began cooperating against Panozzo and that he knew Panozzo since 2007 and represented himself as a member of the Chicago Outfit. In July 2014, Panozzo was arrested by the FBI and Chicago Police Department for his participation in a burglary located on 13451 S. Brandon Avenue in Cook County. In April 2014, he was indicted for extortion in relation to his participation in a loansharking operation during the 2000s, Panozzo remained in custody until his plea deal in January 2019, he pled guilty in June 2019, and was sentenced to 14 years in prison in September 2019.
- Andrew Rovito - born in 1980. Sentenced to 5 years in prison in 2013 for a credit card scam.
- Filippo "Gigi" Rovito—Burr Ridge restaurant owner was sentenced to 6 years imprisonment for kidnapping and rape in 1997. He was hired by Mickey Davis to arrange the beating of R.J. Serpico the owner of Ideal Motors, a used-car dealership in Melrose Park. R.J. Serpico had a $300,000 debt by Salvatore DeLaurentis. The beating never happens because one of the men who Gigi has hired, George Brown was an FBI informant.. In May 2026, Rovito and several Greek-American associates were arrested in a gambling bust. Rovito posted $1 million dollar cash bail.
- Joseph Jerome "Jerry" Scalise—soldier, best known for stealing the Marlborough diamond. Currently incarcerated.
- Michael "A1 Mike" Zitello—Cicero crew soldier and bookmaker. He is a former protégé of Louis "Louie Tomatoes" Marino.

=== Imprisoned members ===
- James "Little Jimmy" Marcello—former boss during the 2000s. Born in December 1943. In April 2005, Marcello was arrested in Illinois and charged with conducting an illegal gambling business since 1996, obstructing a criminal investigation, the indictment also alleged Marcello engaged in a tax fraud conspiracy to obstruct the IRS in the assessment and collection of corporate and individual income taxes between 1996 and April 2004. In early 2009, Marcello was sentenced to life imprisonment for participating in the June 1986 murder of the Spilotro brothers.
- Robert William Panozzo Sr.—Grand Avenue crew soldier. Born in March 1960. In January 2019, Panozzo was given an 18-year prison sentence for racketeering, solicitation of murder, conspiracy to murder, manufacturing and transportation of delivering more than 900 grams of cocaine, and burglary. In September 2019, Panozzo was sentenced to 14 years in prison after he was convicted of one count of extortion as he had attempted to recover a $100,000 debt from 2005, after he had assaulted the debtor and torched his garage.

=== Inactive members ===
- William DiDomenico—born in October 1942. DiDomenico is considered as an inactive member of the Chicago Outfit since 2025, and he was considered as an alleged close associate of Salvatore "Solly D" DeLaurentis during the 1980s and 1990s. In December 1992, DiDomenico was sentenced by former U.S. District Judge Ann Claire Williams to over 5 years in prison for tax fraud and conspiracy of operating an illegal gambling business.
- Nicholas "Jumbo" Guzzino—former capo of the Chicago Heights crew. According to Nick Calabrese, he became a made man in 1983, and was sponsored by Dominick Palermo, a powerful underboss in the Chicago Heights crew under Albert Tocco. Guzzino took over whatever remained of the old Chicago Heights Crew. It is possible and highly likely that he is retired.
- Joseph "Jerry" Scalise—born in December 1937. Scalise is considered as an inactive member of the Chicago Outfit. Scalise was a suspect in the London-Marlborough jewellery store heist in September 1980, with Scalise netting approximately $3.5 million. Scalise was sentenced to 15 years in prison in August 1984, and he was released around December 1992 or early 1993. In January 1994, Scalise was arrested alongside Anthony Aleman, and Robert Pullia for the possession of stolen burglary tools.

=== Associates ===
- Dominic Buttitta—associate. Strip club owner and father of fellow mobster Anthony Buttitta. They both were arrested by the FBI for an illegal internet gambling business.
- Anthony Buttitta—associate. Son of fellow mobster Dominic Buttitta. They both were arrested by the FBI for an illegal internet gambling business.
- Michael "Mickey" Davis—Cicero crew associate; born in 1958. Davis was reputedly associated with Peter DiFronzo and Salvatore "Solly D" DeLaurentis during his tenure with the Chicago Outfit. In November 2014, former U.S. District Judge Samuel Der-Yeghiayan sentenced Davis to 4 years in prison for extortion, as Davis had allegedly loaned $300,000 to the victim, Davis in turn hired 2 associates who hired another associate to assault the victim, whom turned out to be a government informant.
- Vincent "Uncle Mick" Del Giudice—Cicero crew associate; born in April 1965. In March 2022, U.S. District Judge Virginia Mary Kendall sentenced Giudice to over 1 year and a half in prison for operating an illegal sports gambling ring, with $3.6 million in forfeiture. In April 2019, it was reported that over $1 million in cash was seized at his home, along with gold coins valued at $92,000, and silver bars and jewellery estimated worth over $345,000. According to prosecutors, Giudice operated an illegal bookmaking business from between 2016 and 2019 within Lemont, Frankfort, Orland Park and Woodridge, and allegedly operated a professional sporting business from Costa Rica with approximately 20 agents and sub-agents under his realm from his sports betting business.
- Robert Dominic—Grand Avenue crew associate. In February 2025, Dominic was indicted for defrauding the United States government and tax evasion.
- Carlo "The Fat Man/Carl D" Dote—Elmwood Park crew associate, café owner and bookmaker.
- Michael Frontier—associate. In April 2024, Frontier was sentenced to 2 years in prison for operating an illegal sports gambling ring with the Outfit. Frontier had pleaded guilty in the case and admitted that he had run a team of at least five agents, recruiting gamblers and placing wagers on games through an online company based in Costa Rica.
- Gioacchino "Jack" Galione—Elmwood Park crew associate. Galione and Gene "Mean Gene" Cassano were on trial for assaulting Luigi Mucerino over a $10,000 juice loan. The charges were later dismissed.
- Nicholas Gio—associate; born on September 18, 1966. Gio served as an enforcer for the Outfit. In December 1991, Gio was indicted alongside Leonard Patrick and Gus Alex for racketeering, and he was sentenced to 11 years in prison. In 1995, he was sentenced to life in prison, for the 1987 murder of hair stylist John Castaldo. Gio is serving his sentence at Danville Correctional Center.
- Paul Koroluk—associate and joint leader of the P-K street crew. The crew is named after the leaders Robert Panozzo Sr. and Koroluk. The P-K crew posed as police officers to rob drug houses on Chicago's South and West Sides. Koroluk is currently serving an 18-year prison sentence on RICO charges.
- Rocco "Rocky" Lombardo—associate. Lombardo is the brother of former Outfit consigliere Joseph Lombardo. In 2007, he was sentenced to 5 years probation for tax fraud.
- Frank Orlando—associate. At his trial, the FBI alleged Orlando introduced printing firm owner Mark Dziuban to Paul Carparelli to discuss extortion attempts. In 2014, he was sentenced to almost 4 years in prison on extortion charges.
- Domenic Poeta—Cicero crew associate; born in April 1957. In November 2020, Poeta was sentenced to 1 year in prison by former U.S. District Judge Matthew Kennelly for operating an illegal gambling operation, from between 2012 and 2017, the operation's income was approximately estimated at $3.7 million, Poeta was also ordered to pay $1.4 million in forfeiture.
- Mark Polchan—associate and member of the Outlaws Motorcycle Club. In December 2010, Polchan was convicted for a series of jewel heists and for the bombing of a video poker machine company. He was a given a 60-year prison sentence in October 2011. In October 2021, federal judge Ronald A. Guzman imposed a new sentence upon Polchan, who was ordered to serve a 30-year prison sentence, for racketeering, illegal gambling and tax fraud. It has been alleged Polchan was associated with Michael Sarno during his association with the Outfit.
- Rick Rizzolo—associate. Strip club owner and in Las Vegas.
- Emil "Nick the Badge" Schullo—Cicero crew associate; born in November 1944. Schullo previously served as a Cicero police chief. He was convicted in 2002 in a federal racketeering case alongside Chicago mafioso Michael "Big Mike" Spano and then-Cicero Mayor Betty Loren-Maltese. He awarded a contract to a security company owned by Spano. In January 2003, Schullo was sentenced to 6 years in prison for his involvement in a $12 million insurance fraud conspiracy, after his conviction of racketeering, mail fraud, and conspiracy in August 2002. He was released from prison in January 2011.
- Michael Spano Jr.—Cicero crew associate; born in May 1969. In August 2002, Spano was convicted of helping operate dummy companies and creating fraudulent records, and in January 2003, he was sentenced by former U.S. District Judge John F. Grady to over 6 years in prison, with 5 years of probation and restitution of $11 million.
- Casey Szaflarski—Chinatown crew associate; born in January 1958. In February 2012, Szaflarski was convicted of operating video poker machines on behalf of Michael "Big Mike" Sarno since 2002, and was sentenced to 3 years in prison. According to the Illinois Gaming Board, Szaflarski's illegal gambling operation was worth approximately $30 million. In May 2025, Szaflarski was indicted on felony charges and accused of breaking into a home in West Dundee, Illinois in March 2025, and stealing jewellery worth between $10,000 and $100,000.
- Anthony Volpendesto—associate. Son of mobster Sam Volpendesto. In August 2011, Volpendesto was sentenced to 15 years in prison for robbing jewellery stores and transporting stolen goods, and ordered to pay $1.5 million in restitution. Volpendesto was convicted along with Michael Sarno and Outlaws member Mark Polchan in 2014 for running the illegal gambling establishment "C&S Amusements" in Cicero.

== Former members ==
- Joseph "Joe the Builder" Andriacchi—former consigliere. Andriacchi was a cousin by marriage to Joey "The Clown" Lombardo, Andriacchi was charged with the disappearance of Anthony Zizzo in 2006. He died in August 2024.
- Leonard "Fat Lenny" Caifano—former soldier. Leonard Caifano was the brother of Marshall Caifano and a childhood friend of Sam Giancana. Caifano was a bookmaker and loanshark who worked for Giancana during the Outfit's takeover of the numbers rackets controlled by African-American organized crime figures on Chicago's South Side. On June 19, 1951, Leonard Caifano, Marshall Caifano, Giancana and Vincent Ioli took part in an attempted kidnapping of Theodore Roe, a Black policy racket boss, who was traveling in an automobile with three off-duty Chicago police officers serving as his bodyguards. Leonard Caifano was shot in the head and killed, aged 42, when he tried to pull Roe into a car at 739 South Western Avenue.
- James "Jimmy Poker" DiForti—former loanshark and secretary-treasurer of International Laborers Union Local 5 in Chicago Heights. In July 1997, DiForti was charged with the 1988 murder of William Benham. DiForti died on June 6, 2000.
- Louis "Louie the Mooch" Eboli—former soldier. Louis Eboli was the son Thomas Eboli, an acting boss of the Genovese family in New York. He moved to Chicago circa 1961, operating gambling, loansharking and extortion rackets in the city's western suburbs. Following the murder of Thomas Eboli in July 1972, Louis Eboli vowed to avenge his father's death but was prevented from doing so by Outfit boss Anthony Accardo. Accardo had Eboli placed under armed guard and confined to his Melrose Park home to ensure his cooperation and prevent him from being targeted by his father's killers. In June 1986, Eboli was allegedly involved in the murders of the brothers Anthony and Michael Spilotro, who were killed in the basement of Eboli's home in Bensenville. According to government witness Nicholas Calabrese, Eboli was the strangler of Michael Spilotro. Eboli died from pancreatic cancer on September 22, 1987, aged 52.
- James "Jimmy I" Inendino—former underboss and capo of the Cicero Crew. According to sources, Inendino operated as captain of the Cicero crew since 2010. He died on February 23, 2023.
- Ernest Rocco "Rocky" Infelice—former capo. Infelice served as a paratrooper during World War II. He became the capo of the Cicero crew following the death of Joseph Ferriola in March 1989, overseeing Outfit gambling, extortion and loansharking operations in suburban Cook and Lake counties. Infelice was one of twenty mobsters indicted on federal racketeering charges on February 7, 1990. He was convicted of racketeering and conspiracy to commit murder on March 10, 1992; a jury concluded that Infelice had conspired to kill bookmaker Hal Smith but was unable to deliberate on whether he had actually participated in Smith's 1985 murder. Infelice was sentenced in March 1993 to 63 years in federal prison. In March 2005, Infelice was transferred from the Federal Correctional Institution, El Reno, Oklahoma to the Federal Medical Center, Devens, Massachusetts, where he died on July 22, 2005, aged 82.
- John "Johnny Apes" Monteleone—former capo and acting boss. Monteleone was a capo of the 26th Street/Chinatown crew, overseeing sports bookmaking, loansharking and labor rackets in Cicero, the South Side, and the south suburbs. He became acting boss of the crime family when Outfit front boss Sam Carlisi and underboss John DiFronzo were imprisoned in the mid-1990s. Monteleone was also responsible for expanding the Outfit's operations into Milwaukee as the Balistrieri family declined during the 1990s. He died of natural causes in January 2001.

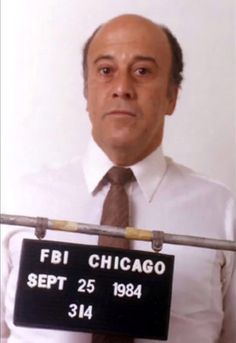
Bobby Salerno

- Robert "Bobby the Boxer" Salerno—former soldier. Salerno was a boxer, boxing trainer and promotor, who trained and promoted fights for Ernie Terrell and Earnie Shavers among others. He was an enforcer and soldier in the Cicero crew under Joseph Ferriola and Ernest Rocco Infelice. On February 7, 1985, Salerno and other members of the crew murdered Hal Smith, an independent bookmaker in Lake County who had ceased paying the Outfit for protection, at the home of William Jahoda in Long Grove. Smith was found dead from stabbing, strangulation and torture in the trunk of his own car on February 10, 1985. At a 1991 trial, Infelice and Robert Bellavia were convicted of Smith's murder, but the jury was deadlocked on Salerno's verdict. He was convicted in a retrial in February 1995, and sentenced to life in prison in October 1995. Salerno was released in May 2017. He died of natural causes in Arizona in January 2023, aged 88.

== Former associates ==
The Outfit is notable for having had other ethnic groups besides Italians as high-ranking associates since the family's earliest days. A prime example of this was Jake "Greasy Thumb" Guzik, a Polish Jew, who was the top "bagman" and "accountant" for decades until his death. Others were Murray Humphreys, who was of Welsh descent, Gus Alex, a Greek, and Ken Eto (aka Tokyo Joe), who was Japanese-American.

Another well-known associate of the Outfit is Jewish New York City mobster Benjamin Siegel. Siegel was a childhood friend of Capone. Siegel's organization in Las Vegas and Los Angeles was an ally of the Outfit from 1933 to 1961 when the family boss, Mickey Cohen, was imprisoned and the family was decimated. Other Jewish associates of the Outfit include Leonard Patrick and David Yaras.

- Paul "Paulie" DiCaro — former associate. DiCaro oversaw a burglary ring operating on the South Side of Chicago which reported to Samuel Carlisi. In 1985, DiCaro was convicted of racketeering and violating the Hobbs Act for a series of robberies which took place between 1970 and 1978, and the June 1973 attempted murder of Ronald Brown. He was sentenced to ten years in prison. On March 25, 1987, DiCaro was found guilty of conspiracy and interstate transportation of stolen property for masterminding the theft of $1.5 million in cobalt from a Chicago Heights warehouse in April 1985. He was sentenced to 18 years in prison. On April 18, 1989, DiCaro was convicted of conspiracy in a November 1983 attempted $1 million heist at a Crete race track. He was sentenced on July 27, 1989 to a consecutive six-year prison term. He was released from federal prison on October 5, 1999. DiCaro died from cancer on June 21, 2026, aged 84.
- Anthony Francis "Jeep" Daddino (born on December 3, 1929) — former associate. Daddino was born in Cook County, Illinois, and his family hailed from Calabria and Campania, his father was a registered boiler maker in 1940 for a railroad company and the Daddino family resided in Schiller Park around this time, his father was legally naturalised in June 1942. Daddino grew up and attended high school together with Donald Stephens, the Mayor of Rosemont, Illinois, from between 1956 and 2007. It is believed Daddino became associated with the Chicago Mafia by the late 1960s. In May 1961, Daddino was arrested for being in possession of $40,000 worth of stolen cigarettes which were stolen from a warehouse located on 4800 Central Avenue, in Forest View, Illinois, in April 1961, and in January 1962, Daddino along with Peter DiFronzo, Medo Calzavarra and John Terello were indicted in Milwaukee for interstate transportation of merchandise, and in November 1963, he was sentenced to 10 years in prison, and was released sometime during the 1960s. It is believed Daddino was placed in the Grand Avenue crew headed by Joseph Lombardo, and was placed "on record" with Louis "Louie the Mooch" Eboli. By the 1980s, Daddino served as a building inspector in Rosemont. Eboli died in September 1987, and it is believed that Daddino was reassigned to the Melrose Park crew under Samuel Carlisi. In September 1988, Daddino and Frank Schweihs were indicted for the extortion of Red Wemette and Leonard Cross, and was convicted in September 1989, he was sentenced in February 1990 to 3 years in prison with 5 years of probation and a fine of over $43,000. In an December 1992 indictment, it was revealed that Daddino was marked for death in the late 1980s which was ordered by Samuel Carlisi and James Marcello. In 1999, he was found in contempt of court for refusing to testify before a grand jury and was released in July 2000. He died in August 2008.

== Government informants and witnesses ==
- Louis Bombacino—born in 1923. He was a former bookmaker. Between 1965 and 1967, Bombacino contacted the FBI while in prison awaiting trial on a robbery charge. He admitted to involvement in a large-scale bookmaking operation under the control of Jackie Cerone and Fiore Buccieri. He was murdered in Tempe, Arizona on the morning of October 6/7, 1975 by the Chicago Outfit while hiding under the alias "Joe Nardi", Paul Schiro and Tony Amadio were suspected in the car bombing. His testimony against Cerone resulted in 5 years' imprisonment in May 1970 and he relocated to Arizona and secured a warehouse job before his murder.
- George Brown—associate (2016): Brown worked as a debt under Paul Carparelli. After he became an FBI informant he testified against Mickey Davis and Paul Carparelli, that he was hired to break both legs of the Melrose Park car dealer R.J. Serpico. His testimonial helped to arrest outfit members and associates: Robert McManus, Michael "Mickey" Davis, Mark Dziuban, Frank Orlando, Vito Iozzo, James Amabile and Paul Carparelli.
- Richard Cain—born in October 1931. He served as Chief Investigator for the Cook County Police Department. Cain joined the Chicago Police Department (Vice Squad) in 1956 until 1960. In June 1961, Cain was allegedly met by a CIA staffer in Mexico City, he was deported from Mexico in 1962 for carrying a loaded gun and brass knuckles, violating his tourist permit by working and impersonating a Mexican government official. He was released from prison in October 1971. On December 20, 1971, he was shot and killed on orders of the Chicago Outfit. Harry Aleman, Joey Lombardo and Frank Schweihs were suspected of killing him.
- Frank Calabrese Jr.—associate (2005)
- Nicholas Calabrese—born in November 1942. He is a former soldier in the Chicago Outfit. He was the brother of Frank Calabrese Sr. and uncle of Frank Calabrese Jr. and the star witness of the Family Secrets case. Calabrese was convicted for his involvement in 14 murders and sentenced to 12 years' imprisonment by District Judge James Zagel.
- Frank Cullotta—born in December 1938. He was a former associate and friend of Tony Spilotro, and was involved in his Hole in the Wall gang based in Las Vegas. In 1982, Cullotta was imprisoned and was approached by the FBI with a wiretap of Spilotro talking with someone about "having to clean our dirty laundry", which Cullotta took as an insinuated contract on his life. Due to this, in July 1982, Cullotta finalized an agreement with the prosecutors, sentenced to eight years in prison, but paroled in 1984 to the witness protection program. Cullotta died on August 20, 2020.
- Ken Eto—born in 1919. He was a former Japanese-American Chicago Outfit associate. He arrived in Chicago from Washington in 1949. Eto's criminal record dates back to 1942 for violating a wartime curfew. In February 1983, Eto survived an assassination attempt on his life by Outfit hitmen Jasper Campise and John Gattuso after 3 bullets ricocheted off of his skull, he immediately joined protective custody and turned informant against the Outfit, Outfit captain Vincent Solano ordered the attempt. The assassination attempt is believed to have revolved around paranoia towards Eto following his guilty plea on illegal gambling charges, which provoked the Chicago Outfit to believe the possibility of Eto being easily persuaded to cooperate with the government against the Outfit. The hitmen, 68-year-old Jasper Campise and 47-year-old John Gattuso were offered government protection and declined, they were both found strangled and stabbed in July 1983 inside of the trunk of a 1981 Volvo registered to Campise. The FBI estimated his criminal earnings of between "$150,000 to $200,000" per week and bribe payoffs of $12,000 per month to Chicago policemen. He died in January 2004 at the age of 84 from natural causes.
- Jeff Hollingshead—associate (2014): Hollingshead was an associate of the Grand Avenue Crew and a member of the P-K street crew named after the leaders Robert Panozzo Sr. and Paul Koroluk. The P-K crew posed as police officers to rob drug houses on Chicago's south and west side.
- William "B.J." Jahoda—former associate. He operated a sports bookmaking ring with Sam Sammarco between 1976 and 1979. Jahoda later began a partnership with Rocco Infelise in 1979 through to 1988, the operation allegedly earned over $8 million in profits. He operated an illegal parlay card business with Michael Sarno, James Damopoulos, Salvatore DeLaurentis and Infelise from 1979 to 1983 in Lake County, Illinois and other parts of Chicago. He also operated the Rouse House casino in suburban Libertyville, Illinois in 1982 which generated approximately $500,000 in profits, during this time he paid Infelise $1500 monthly payments to bribe the Lake County Sheriff to get advance notice of law enforcement raids. By the fall of 1988, Infelise told Jahoda that he was paying $10,000 to the Cook County Police Department Sheriff for protection and that he used undersheriff and former Cook County Republican Party chairman James Dvorak as the intermediate, Dvorak was sentenced to 3½ years in prison in April 1994 for accepting bribes. In September 1989, Infelise confirmed that he was paying $35,000 altogether to incarcerated Outfit members and Chicago police officers. In early 1990, the government alleged Infelise and Jahoda gave out a $50,000 loan to an undercover IRS agent under the identity of "Larry Weeks" who Infelise instructed to bribe a Wisconsin zoning official to gain favorable selection in their efforts to get commercial/industrial property near Lake Geneva, Wisconsin as residential property. He died in 2004.
- Leonard Patrick—born in October 1913. Former associate heavily involved in illegal gambling rackets active in the North Side of Chicago. In June 1933, he was sentenced to 10 years in prison for robbing a bank in Culver, Indiana. He came to the attention of the U.S. Attorney in 1958 as a Chicago Outfit affiliate. In 1975, Patrick was convicted of contempt after he refused to testify under immunity against Chicago police lieutenant Ronald O'Hara and admitted to payoffs of $500 per month to O'Hara. Patrick was released in July 1978. He pleaded guilty to criminal charges in April 1992. It is alleged the Outfit ordered the bombing of Sharon Patrick's car outside her home in Rogers Park, Chicago in May 1992, as a result of his guilty plea. In September 1992, he testified against the Chicago Outfit. He is believed to have been involved in, if not ordered, the 1965 assassination of 24th Ward Alderman Ben Lewis, the city's first black alderman and Democrat committeeman. He died in 2006.
- Gerald Scarpelli—soldier (1988)

== Factions and territories ==
=== Crews ===
The Chicago Outfit is composed of a number of factions, or "street crews", involved in various criminal activities, including loansharking, gambling and labor racketeering. A percentage of the profits generated by these crews is paid to the organization's leaders. The Outfit's five original crews were based at Taylor Street, Grand Avenue, 26th Street, the North Side, and suburban Chicago Heights. According to the FBI, four crews remain active as of 2025.

- 26th Street crew/Chinatown crew/South Side crew—The 26th Street crew operates on Chicago's South Side, including the 26th Street area, Bridgeport and Chinatown, as well as the south suburbs, and Cicero. The crew remains active.
- Chicago Heights crew—The Chicago Heights crew was based in Chicago Heights, Illinois, operating in Chicago's south suburbs and Northwest Indiana. The crew was amalgamated by the 26th Street/Chinatown crew in the 1990s.
- Cicero crew—The Cicero crew is based in Cicero, Illinois and operates in suburban Cook, Lake and McHenry counties. The crew remains active, and is the most influential in the Outfit.
- Elmwood Park crew—The crew remains active.
- Grand Avenue crew—The crew remains active.
- Melrose Park crew/West Side crew—The crew is defunct.
- North Side crew/Rush Street crew—Operating from Rush Street, the crew controlled rackets on Chicago's North Side and the adjoining suburbs. The crew is defunct.
- Taylor Street Crew—The crew is defunct.

== List of murders committed by the Chicago Outfit ==
Name	Date	Rank	Reason
Vincenzo "Big Jim" Colosimo	May 11, 1920	Boss	The murder of 42-year-old Outfit boss Colosimo was allegedly ordered by Johnny Torrio and committed by Frank Yale, who shot Colosimo at least once in the head at his restaurant located at 2126 South Wabash Avenue, after he refused the Outfit from entering into bootlegging.
Francesco "Frankie Yale" Ioele	July 1, 1928	Unknown	Yale was shot multiple times in the head in a drive-by shooting, with Thompson submachine guns and a shotgun, at 923 44th Street in Borough Park, Brooklyn, New York. It is believed Yale was murdered by the Outfit or by the Genna crime family after hijacking an alcohol-whisky shipment bound for Chicago.
William J. Drury	September 25, 1950	Associate	48-year-old Drury, a former Chicago police captain, was killed by a shotgun blast inside his car at the garage of his home at 1843 West Addison Street. It is believed Drury was murdered for testifying against the Outfit in the Kefauver hearings.
Charles Gross	February 6, 1952	Associate	Gross, a 56-year-old Republican Party committeeman for the 31st Ward in Chicago, was shot seven times with a shotgun in front of the Scandinavian Evangelical Church on Chicago's Northwest Side. Gross was allegedly murdered as a result of seeking to disrupt Outfit influence within Chicago.
Theodore P. "Tough Teddy" Roe	August 4, 1952	Associate	53-year-old Roe, an African-American policy kingpin based in the South Side of Chicago, resisted the Outfit's attempts to take control his rackets and had earlier survived a kidnapping attempt, during which, Leonard Caifano, a member of Sam Giancana's crew, was killed by Roe's gang. He was shot five times and killed by two men using 12-gauge shotguns outside of his apartment located at 5239 South Michigan Avenue. Marshall Caifano was allegedly one of the shooters.
Paul "Needle Nose" LaBriola and James S. Weinberg	March 9, 1954	Associate	The Outfit considered LaBriola and Weinberg liable to cooperate with authorities after the pair were recorded on a wiretap in 1953 plotting to kill Abraham Teitelbaum in order to take control of the Chicago Restaurant Association. 37-year-old LaBriola and 53-year-old Weinberg were found drugged and strangled in the trunk of a vehicle on the South Side of Chicago on March 15, 1954. Gerald Covelli, Frank Laino and Sam Mesi were allegedly involved in the murders.
Charles "Cherry Nose" Gioe	August 19, 1954	Captain	50-year-old Outfit capo Gioe was shot once in the head inside of his car at 1143 West Erie Street, near May Street. It is believed Joseph Glimco ordered Gioe's murder for interfering in a labor dispute Glimco was having with a contractor.
Frank "Frankie Diamond" Maritote	August 23, 1954	Soldier/Associate	59-year-old Outfit enforcer Maritote, a brother-in-law to Al Capone, was shot multiple times with a .38 calibre pistol and a shotgun as he drove his car into the garage of his home. He was killed during a power struggle in the Outfit.
William Morris "Willie" Bioff	November 4, 1955	Associate	Bioff, a 55-year-old former Outfit associate and labor racketeer, became a government witness in 1943. He was killed in a car bombing in the driveway of his home at 1250 East Bethany Home Road in Phoenix, Arizona, where he was living in witness protection.
Alex Louis Greenberg	December 8, 1955	Associate	65-year-old Greenberg had previously served as a financial adviser to the Capone gang. Greenberg was shot four times by two gunmen as he and his wife left a restaurant at the intersection of Union Avenue and Twenty-eighth Street on Chicago's South Side, after he testified against members of the Outfit.
Leon Marcus	March 31, 1957	Associate	Marcus served as Chicago bank chairman. It is believed his murder was revolved around a money dispute between Sam Giancana, or to prevent him testifying against the Chicago Outfit at his trial in September 1957, as Marcus was under indictment for misapplying bank funds and falsifying records. Marcus was shot once in the head by a .45 caliber pistol and he was found in a vacant lot in the Southside of Chicago.
Salvatore Moretti	April 16, 1957	Associate	Moretti allegedly served as a driver for Sam Giancana. Moretti was found in the trunk of his car in Will County, Illinois, shot and strangled to death, possibly due to internal or power disputes.
Gus Greenbaum	December 3, 1958	Associate	Greenbaum served as the overseer for the Chicago and New York families interests in Las Vegas for skimming the casinos. It is believed Greenabum, and his wife, were murdered as Greenbaum was stealing money from the casinos to fund his drug and alcohol addiction, Greenbaum and his wife were found with their throats slashed with a butcher knife, in Phoenix, Arizona.
Joseph Bronge	November 6, 1959	Associate/Soldier	Bronge was a Chicago beer distributor and associate of Anthony Accardo. It is believed Bronge was shot 5 times in the head and killed outside of his office in Melrose Park, as the Outfit were seeking to take control of his territory.
Roger Touhy	December 16, 1959	Associate	Touhy was shot and killed by a shotgun blast at the garage of his home, just after 22 days from his release from prison after serving a 25-year prison sentence for kidnapping, allegedly for suing Anthony Accardo, located at 125 N. Lotus Avenue, Chicago.
William "The Saint" Skally	January 5, 1960	Associate	Skally allegedly served as a liaison between a drug trafficking operation and Sam Giancana. Skally was shot to death inside of his car in Chicago.
Arthur Adler	January 20, 1960	Associate	43-year old Adler was found in a sewer on March 28, 1960, as Adler had previously testified against organized crime in Chicago involving the Outfit's infiltration in the restaurant and nightclub scene, with Adler being the owner of a restaurant-nightclub called the Trade Winds on the Northside of Chicago.
Herman Posner	February 9, 1960	Associate	72-year old Posner was stabbed to death after he had implicated the Outfit's infiltration over the Local 110 of the Chicago Moving Picture Operators Union to the United States government.
Michael Urgo	October 13, 1960	Associate	Urgo was an attorney and the son-in-law of Guido De Chiaro, a juke box distributor and Chicago Outfit affiliate. Urgo came to the aid of Chiaro and was shot in the chest.
Frank Del Guidice	December 12, 1960	Associate	51-year old Guidice was shot in the head and killed inside of his car located at the Westside of Chicago.
Ralph Del Genio	June 20, 1961	Associate	Genio was a truck driver for the Chicago Bureau of Sanitation at the time of his death. It is believed Genio was murdered by the Outfit for acquiring gambling debts.
William John "Billy" McCarthy and James Rocco "Jimmy" Miraglia	May 13-14, 1962		Anthony Spilotro was ordered to kill McCarthy and Miraglia after the duo killed two Outfit associates and a waitress in a shooting at an Elmwood Park, Illinois bar. With the assistance on Frank Cullotta, Spilotro apprehended 24-year-old McCarthy and tortured him by placing his head in a vise until he revealed Miraglia's location. McCarthy was then killed by having his throat cut. The following day, Spilotro tracked down and strangled 24-year-old Miraglia. The bodies of McCarthy and Miraglia were discovered in the trunk of McCarthy's car on May 14, 1962.
Alex Sorrentino	August 24, 1962	Associate	Sorrentino was shot multiple times and killed, he was found located at 501 Parnell Chicago Heights.
Leo Foreman	November 18, 1963	Associate	Foreman was found in the trunk of an automobile, shot and stabbed to death.
Guy "Lover Boy" Mendola	August 31, 1964	Associate	Mendola was shot 5 times by a shotgun and killed in Stone Park, Illinois.
Manny Skar	September 11, 1965	Associate	Skar had dealt with the gambling operations for the Outfit and had operated the Sahara Inn in Chicago. Skar was shot and killed at his home in Lake Shore Drive.
Angelo Boscarino	November 24, 1965	Associate	Boscarino was stabbed several times by an ice pick with his throat slashed.
Louis "Gigi" Pratico	April 30, 1966	Associate	Pratico was shot twice in the head and killed at the age of 42. Pratico was a former Chicago Heights police officer, and was a close associate of Frankie LaPorte.
Robert Hannah	February 22, 1967	Associate	Hannah was shot 8 times and killed.
Wesley Funicella	February 27, 1967	Associate	It is believed Funicella was strangled to death for owing the Outfit unpaid debts.
Alan Rosenberg	March 17, 1967	Associate	Rosenberg was shot 9 times and killed for owing a substantial amount of money to Felix Alderisio.
Carmen Trotta	March 21, 1970	Associate	Trotta, an Outfit associate, was shot to death in Lyons, Illinois. Unknown who killed him or why.
Michael Albergo	August 1970	Associate	The Chicago Outfit were worried Albergo, a Chicago Outfit associate and enforcer, would cooperate after being charged and arrested for loansharking. It is believed Frank Calabrese was the killer.
Robert Pronger	June 17, 1971	Associate	Pronger was a NASCAR driver and car racing champion. He disappeared in 1971 and is believed to have been murdered by William Dauber and Steve Ostrowsky.
Salvatore "Sambo" Cesario	October 19, 1971	Soldier	53-year-old Outfit soldier Cesario became involved in an affair with the girlfriend of imprisoned underboss Felix Alderisio. He was shot and bludgeoned to death by two masked killers as he sat in a lawn chair outside his home at 1071 W. Polk St. The murder was carried out by the "Wild Bunch", a hit squad headed by Harry Aleman which operated under the Outfit's Cicero crew. Aleman and William Petrocelli were the alleged killers.
Guido "Weeds" Fidanzi	August 8, 1972	Associate	Fidanzi was shot 4 times and killed at a gas station located at Chicago Heights, Illinois, due to an internal dispute.
Roger Croach	September 2, 1972	Associate	Croach was killed the same day his second hand car lot was raided by the FBI and he was killed due to paranoia that he may have cooperated with the FBI.
Mike Logan	September 3, 1972	Associate	Logan owned a chop shop in South Bend, Indiana and was the partner of Roger Croach, whom was murdered the day before Logan's murder. It is believed Logan was murdered for the same motive as Croach, due to paranoia that the men could have potentially cooperated with the FBI following an FBI raid on their illegal stolen car business venture. Logan was found on a road in Starke County, Indiana.
William "Billy" Logan	September 27, 1972	Associate	Logan, a 37-year-old Outfit associate and Teamsters steward, was the ex-husband of Harry Aleman's cousin, Phyllis Napoles, with whom he was engaged in a custody battle and for whose assault and battery he had been arrested. Logan was shotgunned outside his home by Aleman. Louis Almeida was the getaway driver.
William "Joey Red" Klimm	June 23, 1973	Associate	Klimm operated in Las Vegas as a bookmaker and loanshark. It is believed Klimm was murdered by Anthony Spilotro as he had refused extortion attempts by the Spilotro crew in Las Vegas. Spilotro was later acquitted of the Klimm murder.
Richard Cain	December 30, 1973	Associate	39-year-old Cain, an Outfit associate and former Cook County Sheriff's Office chief investigator, was shot twice with a shotgun in Rose's Sandwich Shop at 1117 West Grand Avenue by two assailants. The killing was carried out by the Cicero crew's "Wild Bunch", with Harry Aleman being one of the alleged shooters.
Socrates "Sammy Paper" Rantis	February 24, 1974	Associate	Rantis, a 43-year-old Outfit associate and counterfeiter, was found dead from knife wounds in the trunk of his wife's car in the parking terminal of O'Hare Airport. He was allegedly killed by Harry Aleman and the "Wild Bunch" gang.
William "Billy" Simone	April 21, 1974	Associate	29-year-old Simone, an Outfit associate and partner of Sam Rantis in a counterfeiting ring, was found dead in the back seat of his car near 2446 South Kedvale Avenue, having been hogtied and shot in the head. The murder was allegedly carried out by Harry Aleman's "Wild Bunch" gang.
Orion Williams	July 13, 1974	Associate	Williams, a 38-year-old Outfit associate and suspected informant, was found in the trunk of a car belonging to his girlfriend at 70 East 33rd Street, dead from a shotgun blast. Harry Aleman and his "Wild Bunch" gang were allegedly responsible for the killing.
Daniel Raymond "Danny" Seifert	September 27, 1974		29-year-old businessman and federal witness Seifert was set to testify against the Outfit in a fraud case involving embezzlement and money laundering in the Teamsters pension fund. He was shotgunned in front of his wife and son by a three-man hit team, which included Joseph Lombardo, at his fiberglass factory, Plastic-Matic Products, in Bensenville, Illinois.
Robert "Bobby" Harder	September 28, 1974	Associate	39-year-old Outfit associate Harder, a burglar and jewel thief, escaped an initial murder attempt by Harry Aleman and James Inendino after turning informant, before he was found dead from a gunshot to the face in a bean field near Dwight, Illinois.
Carlo DeVino	January 16, 1975		Outfit associate DeVino, a 46-year-old Cicero crew bookmaker and enforcer, was shot by two assailants when he stepped out from his car in front of his home at 3631 North Nora Avenue. The gunmen were allegedly members of the "Wild Bunch" hit squad.
Edward "Marty" Buccieri	May 12, 1975	Associate	Buccieri, a pit boss at Caesars Palace and associate of organized crime figures in Las Vegas, was killed after demanding a $30,000 finders fee for helping broker financing for casino executive Allen Glick's Argent Corporation. He was shot five times in the head and found in the front seat of his car in the Caesars Palace parking lot. Buccieri's murder was allegedly ordered by Milwaukee family boss Frank Balistrieri, approved by Outfit boss Joey Aiuppa, and carried out by Outfit hitman Anthony Spilotro.
Ronald "Ronnie" Magliano	May 12, 1975	Associate	43-year-old Magliano, an Outfit associate and fence, was blindfolded and shot once in the head with a .22-caliber pistol at his home at 6232 South Kilpatrick Avenue on the South Side of Chicago, which was then set ablaze. He was allegedly killed in relation to a stolen goods ring involving his associate Joseph Lipuma, who was murdered himself weeks before the killing of Magliano. Harry Aleman's "Wild Bunch" were the alleged killers.
Harry Holzer and Linda Turner	June 16, 1975	Associate & Civilian	Holzer and his wife were shot multiples at his home in Saugatuck, Michigan, possibly to prevent from Turner testifying against the Outfit. Law enforcement have alleged Albert Tocco ordered their murders, with Chicago police officer, Edward McCabe, implicated as the killer in the murder. Depending on the source, Holzer was found at his home or in the trunk of his car.
Christopher "Chris" Cardi	June 19, 1975	Associate	43-year-old Cardi, an Outfit associate, loanshark, and former police officer, was shot nine times by two masked gunmen in front of his wife and children at Jim's Beef Stand in Melrose Park. The shooters were allegedly part of Harry Aleman's "Wild Bunch" crew.
Salvatore "Sam Mooney" Giancana	June 19, 1975	Former boss	Giancana was shot once in the head and 5 times in the mouth by a silenced .22-caliber handgun at his home located at 147 S. Wenonah Ave., Oak Park, Illinois. Giancana was murdered as a result of refusing to share profits from his illegal gambling operations, and also to prevent Giancana from testifying against the Chicago Outfit.
Frank "The Greek" Goulakos	August 28, 1975		47-year-old Outfit associate and federal informant Goulakos was shot six times by a masked gunman outside DiLeo's Restaurant at 5615 West Seminole Avenue, where he worked as a cook. Harry Aleman was the alleged shooter.
Nick "Keggie" Galanos	August 30, 1975		Galanos, a 48-year-old Outfit associate, bookmaker and informant who operated in River Forest, was shot seven times in a basement at his home at 5301 West Wabansia Avenue. Harry Aleman was allegedly Galanos' killer.
Louis Bombacino	October 6, 1975		52-year-old Outfit associate Bombacino worked as an FBI informant between 1965 and 1967, and testified against several Outfit members in a 1970 gambling case before going into the Federal Witness Protection Program. He was killed in a car bombing outside his home in Tempe, Arizona after being tracked down by the Outfit. Bombacino's murder was allegedly ordered by Jackie Cerone.
Frank Plum	October 8, 1975		Plum was shot in the head four times in an alley behind 939 North California Avenue.
Anthony J. Reitinger	October 31, 1975		Reitinger, a 34-year-old Outfit associate and bookmaker, was shot by two assailants while he sat in Mama Luna's restaurant at 4346 West Fullerton Avenue. Reitinger's murder was allegedly orchestrated by Harry Aleman because he had failed to pay an Outfit "street tax", and carried out by Aleman's "Wild Bunch" gang.
Tamara Rand	November 9, 1975		Rand, a 54-year-old San Diego real estate investor, was suing Allen Glick, the front man for the Outfit's casinos in Las Vegas. Tony Spilotro shot Rand five times in her home in the Mission Hills neighborhood of San Diego. Los Angeles family member Frank Bompensiero was an accomplice in the murder.
Louis "Louie" DeBartolo	January 31, 1976		29-year-old DeBartolo, an Outfit associate who owed substantial gambling debts to Mafia bookmakers, was found dead in the rear of a store where he worked at 5945 West North Avenue, shot in the head and stabbed in the neck with a broken mop handle. Harry Aleman's "Wild Bunch" crew allegedly carried out the murder.
James "Jimmy" Erwin	May 1, 1976		Erwin, a 28-year-old Outfit associate who was suspected in the murders of two other mobsters, was shot thirteen times by two masked gunmen, armed with a shotgun and a .45 caliber pistol, as he stepped out of his car at 1873 North Halsted Street. He was allegedly killed by Harry Aleman's "Wild Bunch" gang.
Don Bolles	June 13, 1976	None	47-year old Bolles was an Arizona based newspaper investigative reporter. Bolles was killed in a car bomb explosion outside of the Hotel Clarendon in Phoenix, Arizona. Bolles was lured to the Hotel Clarendon under the pretence of meeting a source for a newspaper story which he was covering. John Adamson was later convicted of creating and planting the bomb and he had told law enforcement that he was hired by Max Dunlap to commit the bombing, Dunlap was later identified as an employee of a liquor distribution company connected to the American Mafia.
David Bonadonna	July 22, 1976		61-year-old Kansas City family soldier Bonadonna was allegedly killed by the Outfit's "Wild Bunch" hit squad during a mob war for control over Kansas City's River Quay entertainment district. He was found tortured and shot to death in the trunk of his car.
George Jay Vandermark	August 1, 1976	Associate	52-year old Vandermark was an associate of the Chicago Outfit and had operated as the slot manager of the Stardust casino in Las Vegas. According to authorities, Vandermark had earned approximately $3 million for himself from the infiltration of the Las Vegas casinos and gave the American Mafia approximately $4 million tribute money over the course of several years. Vandermark was portrayed by actor Bill Allison in the 1995 movie Casino under the title of John Nance. Vandermark was last seen alive in the area of 24th Street and Camelback Road in Phoenix, Arizona. The Stardust casino was raided by the FBI in May 1976 and it is believed Vandermark was murdered in Mexico to prevent him from testifying against the Chicago Outfit.
Steve "Stevie O" Ostrowsky	October 5, 1976	Associate	Ostrowsky had reported to Jimmy Cataura and Billy Dauber, and were rivalled against Albert "Caesar the Fox" Tocco within the chop-shop racket in Chicago. Ostrowsky was shot and killed in a parking lot in the Southside of Chicago.
Peter Bufala	October 8, 1976	Associate	Bufala was a baccarat dealer at the MGM Grand Casino. Bufala found shot once in the head and in the chest in the driveway of his home located at 7376 South Spencer Ave., Las Vegas, Nevada. The murder of Bufala remains unsolved.
Gerald "Fat Jerry" Delman	November 21, 1976	Associate	Delman was an associate of the Chicago Outfit and frequented with the Spilotro crew, he had operated the Saratoga Race & Sportsbook on behalf of Anthony Spilotro in Downtown Las Vegas. Delman first became associated with Spilotro in Chicago and handled Spilotro's illegal gambling operations in Indianapolis.
Rick Manzie	December 15, 1976	Associate	Manzie was the husband to singer and actress, Barbara McNair. Manzie was also the friend of Anthony Spilotro and some believe Spilotro may have been involved in his murder.
Al Bramlet	February 24, 1977	Associate	Bramlet had served as the Secretary-Treasurer of the Las Vegas Culinary Workers Union Local 226. Bramlet had association with Anthony Spilotro during his association with the Chicago Outfit. It is believed he was killed by Tom Hanley and his son in the Las Vegas desert for ordering several arson attacks without paying the perpetrators.
Charles "Chuckie the Typewriter" Nicoletti	March 29, 1977	Soldier	Nicoletti, a 60-year-old Outfit soldier and hitman, was shot three times in the head as he sat in his car outside the Golden Horns Restaurant in Northlake, Illinois. He was allegedly killed by Harry Aleman.
Jay Vandermark	April 23, 1977	Associate	Vandermark is the son to George Vandermark, whom was in charge of the skim operations in Las Vegas for the American Mafia. Vandermark was bludgeoned to death inside of his Las Vegas apartment, he also may have been seen as a liability due to his drug addiction.
Richie Ferraro	June 13, 1977	Associate	Ferraro was an associate of the Chicago Outfit and was heavily involved in the chop-shop racket. Ferraro owned the Statewide Auto Wrecking junkyard in Calumet City, Illinois and he had served as the replacement of Steve "Stevie O" Ostrowsky, whom was murdered in October 1976, as the point man in the car-theft racket.
Joey Theo	June 15, 1977	Associate	33-year old Theo was an associate of the Chicago Outfit and was involved in stolen car parts. Theo was shot twice in the head by a shotgun whilst he sat inside of his car in the Southside of Chicago.
Ray Ryan	October 18, 1977	Associate	Ryan was blown up in a car bomb in the parking lot of his Evansville, Indiana health club. Ryan had testified against Marshall Caifano in an extortion case and had tried to bribe his way out of a murder contract upon Caifano's release from prison.
Stevie Garcia	February 2, 1978	Associate	Chicago Outfit burglar, he was found inside the trunk of a car at the Sheraton Hotel next to O'Hare International Airport with multiple stab wounds including slashed from ear to ear, he was suspected of breaking into the home of Anthony Accardo.
Vince Moretti and Don Renno	February 4, 1978	Associates	Moretti was an ex-cop and Chicago Outfit burglar. Moretti was castrated and disemboweled, his face had been burned off with an acetylene torch and he and Renno also had their throats slashed.
James "Jimmy the Bomber" Catuara	July 28, 1978	Captain	Shot dead aged 72 in Cook County, Illinois behind the wheel of a Cadillac, paving the way for Albert Tocco to grab complete control of the Chicago Heights crew and the Outfit's lucrative chop-shop tax. Catuara's crew allegedly oversaw illegal gambling and prostitution.
Michael Volpe	October 5, 1978	Associate	Accardo's longtime housekeeper vanishes. The FBI alleges his disappearance is in connection to Volpe's testimony to a federal grand jury five days previous.
Anthony "Little Tony" Borsellino	May 22, 1979	Soldier	Borsellino, known as a Chicago Outfit hitman, was found shot five times in the back of the head and dumped in a Frankfort farm field. He was killed as a result of falling out with Gerry Scarpelli.
Timmy O'Brien	May 23, 1979	Associate	O'Brien, a salvage yard owner and former friend and business partner of Richie Ferraro is found shot to death in the trunk of his car in Blue Island, Illinois.
Gerald "Jerry the Dinger" Carusiello	September 18, 1979	Associate	Carusiello served as a driver and bodyguard to former Chicago Outfit boss, Joey Aiuppa, during the beginning of his criminal career and association with the Outfit. Carusiello was one of the men who broke into the home of Anthony Accardo, in River Forest, Chicago. Carusiello was shot once in the head and killed, he was found at a condo development located at 951 N. Highway 53 in Addison, Illinois.
Jerry Lisner	October 11, 1979	Associate	Lisner was shot 12 times in the head by Frank Cullotta, the right-hand man of Anthony Spilotro in Las Vegas. Lisner survived the shots and was subsequently strangled with electrical cord before Cullotta reloaded his firearm and shot Lisner again, dying and dumped into the pool at Lisner's home. It is believed Lisner was killed for informing on the Spilotro crew regarding their illegal activities in Las Vegas.
Michael "Mike" Oliver	November 14, 1979	Associate	29-year-old Outfit associate Oliver, an adult bookstore owner and sports bookmaker, was shot during a robbery of his Elk Grove, Illinois pornography shop, allegedly by Cicero crew members Salvatore Cataudella, Robert Salerno, Michael Sarno, Joseph Scalise and Gerald Scarpelli. He was buried at an Outfit burial ground in Darien, Illinois. Oliver's remains were recovered on June 9, 1988, after Scarpelli and James Basile began cooperating with the FBI.
Richard/Robert "Chick" Kurowski	May 24, 1980	Associate	Kurowski owned a junk yard in Northeast Indiana. Kurowski was killed by a sniper bullet, as he was suspected of being an informant.
Frank "Frankie Blue" Bluestein	June 10, 1980	Associate	Bluestein was a member of Anthony Spilotro's "Hole in the Wall Gang." Bluestein was shot and killed by Las Vegas police officers, Gene Smith and David Groover.
William "Billy the Chopper" Dauber	July 2, 1980	Associate	Dauber was a hitman for the Outfit and is suspected in over 20 unsolved homicides, between 1969 and 1980. Dauber was suspected of becoming a government informant several months before his murder, facing charges for gun and cocaine possession. Law enforcement have implicated Frank Calabrese Sr., Ronnie Jarrett, William "Butch" Petrocelli, and Gerald Scarpelli as the killers, Dauber and his wife were shot and killed on a rural road in Will County, Illinois, located at the southwest corner of Manhattan-Monee Road and Scheer Road, by using a M1 carbine and a 12-gauge shotgun.
William "Butch" Petrocelli	March 14–15, 1981		Petrocelli was found inside of a 1977 Ford LTD vehicle, located at 4300 block of West 25th Street in Chicago, Illinois, stabbed twice in the chest, with his throat slashed and his burned off. It is believed Petrocelli was possibly killed for being a government informant, and for skimming money which was intended to go to Chicago Outfit affiliates serving prison sentences.
Joseph Testa	June 30, 1981	Associate	Testa served as responsible for collecting, distributing, and laundering Chicago Outfit money. Testa was also a wealthy land developer. It is believed Testa was murdered as a result of allegedly owing Marshall Caifano over $2 million in a business deal. Testa was killed in a bomb explosion inside of his car at Oakland Park, near Fort Lauderdale, Florida.
Nick D'Andrea	September 13, 1981	Associate	D'Andrea was killed by Nick Calabrese and James Marcello. It is believed D'Andrea was accidentally killed whilst being interrogated for the botched murder of Al Pilotto, the head of Local 5 of the Laborers International Union. It has been alleged the murder of D'Andrea was ordered by Sam Carlisi, John Fecarotta, and Anthony Chiaramonte.
Robert Plummer	May-June, 1982	Associate	It is believed Plummer was found in the trunk of his car in a parking lot in Mundelein, Illinois, beaten and strangled to death, after being lured to an illegal gambling den in Libertyville, Illinois, possibly for working with another gang or being an informant, although William Jahoda testified that Plummer was killed for being involved in drugs. It has been alleged the murder of Plummer was orchestrated by Rocco Ernest Infelice and Salvatore DeLaurentis.
Allen Dorfman	January 20, 1983	Associate	Dorfman was allocated as the overseer of the Teamster's labor union pension fund. Dorfman was convicted of conspiring to bribe Howard Cannon, a United States senator, and for the bribery plot of Teamsters President Roy Williams, and for racketeering, and was murdered before he was handed a prison sentence. Dorfman was shot 8 times and killed at the parking lot of the Purple Hyatt Hotel in Lincolnwood, Illinois following a lunch meeting. It has been alleged Joey "The Clown" Lombardo was involved in the murder of Dorfman. The murder of Dorfman remains unsolved.
John Gattuso and Jasper "Big Jay" Campise	July 14, 1983		Gattuso served as the Cook County Deputy Sheriff and Campise was a soldier of the Chicago Outfit. Both men were found in the trunk of Campise's car, tortured, strangled and stabbed to death, located at Illinois Route 59 south of the East-West Tollway, I-88, near Naperville, Illinois. It is believed they were murdered for participating in the botched murder of Ken "Tokyo Joe" Eto, which lead Eto to become a government witness.
Richard D. Ortiz and Arthur Morawski	July 23, 1983	Associate	Ortiz had allegedly committed a murder which was not approved by the Outfit. The murder of his friend, Morawski, had not been intended.
James "Mugsy" Tortoriello	November 26, 1984	Soldier	Found in the trunk of a car, shot to death, at a warehouse near Fort Lauderdale-Hollywood International Airport.
Anthony Crissie	December 16, 1984	Associate	Crissie was involved in financing for the Chicago Outfit and served as the manager of a bank in Chicago. Crissie was shot and killed after informing on the Outfit to the FBI and IRS.
Leonard "Little Lenny" Yaras	January 10, 1985	Associate	Yaras was allegedly known as an Outfit enforcer. Yaras was shot several times as he sat in his car. It has been alleged he was skimming profits from the Outfit.
Hal C. Smith	February 7, 1985	Associate	Smith, a 48-year-old bookmaker who operated in Lake County, refused to pay a "street tax" to the Outfit's Cicero crew. He was lured to the home of William Jahoda in Long Grove, Illinois, where he was killed by Robert Bellavia, Ernest Rocco Infelice, Louis Marino and Robert Salerno. Missing for four days, Smith was found in the trunk of his car in the parking lot of an Arlington Heights, Illinois hotel on February 10, 1985, beaten and tortured to death.
Charles "Chuckie English" Inglese	February 13, 1985	Soldier	Found shot several times in the head, possibly due to a power vacuum.
Patrick "Patsy Rich" Ricciardi	July 24, 1985	Unknown - Associate or Soldier	Shot twice in the back of the head whilst sitting inside of a stolen car, allegedly for skimming extortion money and suspected of being an informant. His body was found in the trunk of a car on July 26, two days after going missing.
Mike Lentini	January 13, 1986	Associate	44-year old Lentini was shot to death while sitting inside of his car. Unknown why he was killed.
Richie DePrizio	January 27, 1986	Associate	36-year old DePrizio was shot several times in the head. It is believed he was murdered to prevent possibly testifying against the Outfit during a fraud trial.
Joe Cocozza	March 16, 1986	Associate	Cocozza operated a gasoline station located at the North Side of Chicago. Cocozza was found shot once in the head and killed inside of a car in Evanston, Illinois. It is believed Cocozza was killed for acquiring gambling debts to the Outfit.
Emil "Little Mal" Vaci	June 7, 1986	Associate	Vaci was shot 6 times in the head and killed by Nick Calabrese as the Chicago Outfit administration believed Vaci would become a government witness in an investigation related to a Las Vegas casino skimming operation. Vaci was found in a canal at near 48th Street and Thomas Road in Phoenix, Arizona.
Anthony John "Tony the Ant" Spilotro and Michael Peter "Micky" Spilotro	June 14, 1986		48-year-old Outfit soldier Anthony Spilotro was ordered killed due to his mishandling of the Outfit's Las Vegas rackets. He and his brother, 41-year-old Outfit associate Michael Spilotro, were lured to a home in Bensenville, Illinois under the pretence of attending a ceremony at which Anthony Spilotro would purportedly be promoted to capo and Michael Spilotro would be "made". Instead, they were beaten and strangled to death before being buried in a Newton County, Indiana cornfield. Frank Calabrese, Nicholas Calabrese, James DiForti, Louis Eboli, John Fecarotta, James Marcello, and Frank Schweihs took part in the murders. The Spilotro brothers' bodies were discovered on June 23, 1986.
Giovanni "Big John" Fecarotta	September 14, 1986	Soldier	It is believed Fecarotta was killed as a result of botching the Spilotro brother's burial. The crew Fecaroatta used to dispose of the Spilotro brother's bodies allegedly got scared and managed to get themselves lost in the Indiana cornfields, where they were getting rid of the bodies, leaving a half-dug grave which was quickly discovered. Fecarotta was shot 5 times and killed by Nick Calabrese at the doorway of a bingo hall at 6050 W. Belmont Ave., Chicago.
Tommy McKillip	November 13, 1986	Associate	McKillip was possibly murdered to prevent him from testifying against the Outfit for interstate theft. McKillip was found in the trunk of a car outside of a supermarket located at the southeast corner of Dundee and Buffalo Grove roads in Buffalo Grove, Illinois, shot twice in the head and stabbed 5 times in the chest. The murder of McKillip remains unsolved.
John Castaldo	September 23, 1987	Associate	Castaldo owned two beauty salons in River Forest, Illinois. It is believed Castaldo was found shot to death in an alley at 100 block of Frederick Avenue in Bellwood, Illinois before his stolen car racket was taken over by the Chicago Outfit. The murder of Castaldo remains unsolved.
William "Bill the Pallet Man" Benham	February 14, 1988	Associate	It is believed Benham was shot 6 times and killed by James "Jimmy Poker" DiForti, whom died in June 2000, the murder of Benham remains unsolved.
John Pronger	August 14, 1988	Associate	Pronger was shot twice and killed by using a .357 magnum handgun at his home located at 2547 Spring Hill Drive in Schererville, Illinois.
Phil Goodman	November 22, 1988	Associate	Goodman served as an associate of the Chicago Outfit and was associated with Anthony Spilotro, Goodman returned to Chicago after Spilotro's murder in 1986. Goodman was killed at the Admiral Oasis Motel located at 9353 Waukegan Road in Morton Grove, Chicago. The murder of Goodman remains unsolved.
Jimmy Pellegrino	May 14, 1990	Associate	Pellegrino was the owner of a trucking firm based in Chicago. Pellegrino was found shot once in the head and killed in the Des Plaines River near the Lawrence Avenue Bridge in June, 1990. It is believed Pellegrino was murdered by Steve Manning, a corrupt Chicago police officer reputedly on the pay-roll of the Chicago Outfit, for descending into an argument together.
Victor Lazarus	July 2, 1990	Associate	86-year old Lazarus was an associate of the Chicago Outfit and served as a bookmaker. Lazarus was active in Chicago and Las Vegas. Lazarus was shot in the back of his head at a department store parking lot located at 2050 W. Peterson Ave in Chicago.
Edward Pedote	November 6, 1991	Associate	49-year old Pedote was an associate of the Chicago Outfit. During his criminal career, Pedote specialised in stolen jewellery, and he had criminal convictions of burglary and drugs involvement. Pedote was shot in the face and beaten to death with a table leg inside of a furniture store located at 1823 S. Cicero Ave. in Cicero, Illinois.
Wally Lieberman	November 21, 1991	Associate	Lieberman was an associate of the Chicago Outfit and he was a close associate of Robert "Bobby the Gabeet" Bellavia. Lieberman was a real estate liquidator. Lieberman was shot in the neck in Cicero, Chicago, located at 6000 block of West 31st Street.
Sam "Needles" Taglia	November 4–5, 1992	Associate	Taglia was found shot twice in the head with his throat slashed inside the trunk of his Buick vehicle located at 100 block of North 13th Avenue, Melrose Park, Chicago. Law enforcement have alleged Albert "Albie the Falcon" Vena of being the killer.
Giuseppe Vicari	November 5, 1994	Associate	Vicari was found shot once in the head and killed at his restaurant located at 5243 N. Harlem, Chicago. At the time, Vicari was under indictment for illegal gambling, and he was possibly killed to prevent him from becoming a government witness.
Herbert "Fat Herbie" Blitzstein	January 6, 1997	Associate	It is believed Blitzstein was murdered by the Buffalo and Los Angeles families in order to take over his rackets. Blitzstein was shot once in the head at his home located at 3655 Mt. Vernon Ave, near the intersection of Pecos Road and Twain Avenue, at the Southeast of Nevada, Las Vegas. Law enforcement have said Antonio Davi and Richard Friedman were the killers.
Mike Cutler	May 15, 1998	Civilian	Cutler was shot once in the chest and killed before he was set to testify against the son of Outfit captain Frank "Tootsie" Caruso in an attempted murder trial, located at 5900 block of West Erie Street in Chicago. Caruso had beaten 13-year-old Lenard Clark, a black male who was riding his bike in the neighbourhood of Bridgeport, Chicago, and placed him into a coma, which the police considered as a hate crime. Frank Caruso Jr., who was 18 or 19 years of age at the time, was later convicted of a hate crime and aggravated battery, and he was given an 8-year prison sentence. The murder of Cutler remains unsolved.
Ronnie Jarrett	January 25, 2000	Associate	Jarrett was shot outside of his home in December 1999 located at 3000 block of South Lowe Avenue in Bridgeport, Chicago, due to an inner feud with other Outfit members, and dies in January 2000.
Anthony "Tony The Hatchet" Chiaramonti	November 22, 2001	Captain	It is believed the murder of Chiaramonti was ordered by James Marcello or Michael Sarno and he was possibly killed over video poker and loansharking territories, he was shot 5 times and killed inside of a restaurant located at 3850 S. Harlem Ave., Lyons Township, Illinois. Law enforcement have suspected Anthony "Tough Tony" Calabrese as the killer.
Anthony Zizzo	August-September, 2006	Underboss	Zizzo served as the underboss for the Outfit at the time of his death. Zizzo was last seen leaving his house, allegedly to attend a meeting, and his car was found at a restaurant in Melrose Park. It his believed his murder was the result of a dispute with Michael Sarno over video poker machine businesses, or to prevent him from testifying against the Chicago Outfit. Law enforcement have alleged Michael "The Large Guy" Sarno and Joseph "The Builder" Andriacchi were suspects in the murder of Zizzo.
Gerald Dhamer	November 13, 2006	Civilian	Dhamer was shot and killed as a case of mistaken identity located at 600 block of North Broadway Avenue in Park Ridge, Illinois, with the real target being Salvatore "Sammy Cards" Cataudella, whom lived nearby.
Anthony Catalano	March 25, 2009	Associate	Catalano disappeared in March 2009 and is considered dead, as he was accused of stealing cocaine from a drug gang based in Cicero aligned with the Chicago Outfit.
Jimmy "The Panda" LaValley	August 12, 2009	Associate	LaValley had begun his criminal career with the Chicago Outfit during the 1970s, and was closely associated with Leonard Patrick and Gus Alex. LaValley was a prolific enforcer for the Outfit's North side crew, admitting to more than 50 burglaries and assaults during his tenure with the Chicago Outfit. In July 1992, LaValley began cooperating with law enforcement after he was sentenced to over 7 years in prison, and at the time of his murder, he was in the witness protection program, LaValley was killed at a golf course in Florida.
Norberto Velez	November 26, 2010	Associate	Velez allegedly served as an enforcer and debt collector for the Grand Avenue crew during the 2000s. It has been alleged Velez was shot and killed at his apartment located at the 900 block of West Addison Street, Chicago, for owing the Outfit a substantial amount of money, including taking out a loan to finance a drug deal.
Bobby "Boo Boo" English Jr.	May 31, 2020	Associate	English was shot behind the wheel of his car. His murder remains unsolved.

== In popular culture ==
The Chicago Outfit has a long history of portrayal in Hollywood as the subject of film and television.

=== Film ===
- Little Caesar (1931)
- Scarface (1932)
- Chicago Syndicate (1955)
- The Scarface Mob (television film, 1959)
- Al Capone (1959)
- The St. Valentine's Day Massacre (1967)
- Point Blank (1967)
- Bullitt (1968)
- The Outfit (1973)
- Capone (1975)
- Thief (1981)
- Raw Deal (1986)
- The Untouchables (1987)
- Midnight Run (1988)
- Next of Kin (1989)
- The Firm (1993)
- Casino (1995)
- Payback (1999)
- Road to Perdition (2002)
- Public Enemies (2009)
- Chicago Overcoat (2009)
- Gangster Land (2017)
- Capone (2020)
- The Outfit (2022)

=== Television ===
- The Untouchables (1959–1963)
- The F.B.I. (1965–1974)
- Crime Story (1986–1988)
- The Untouchables (1993–1994)
- Sugartime (TV film) (1995)
- The Rat Pack (1998)
- Prison Break (2005–2009)
- The Chicago Code (2011)
- The Firm (2012)
- Mob Wives: Chicago (2012)
- The Mob Doctor (2012–2013)
- Boardwalk Empire (2010–2014)
- The Making of the Mob: Chicago (2016)

=== Anime ===
- 91 Days (since 2016)
- baccano! (2007)

=== Books ===
- Scott, Sabrina Austen. The Lemon Tree Girl: A Mafia Story. Amazon, 2022. ISBN 979-8985541403

=== Games ===
- Empire of Sin (2020)

== See also ==
- Joe Aiello – rival to Al Capone during Prohibition; was also allied to Salvatore Maranzano during the Castellammarese War
- Grand Rapids Hotel
- Hired Truck Program scandal
- North Side Gang – a rival gang to Al Capone
- Timeline of organized crime in Chicago
- Unione Siciliana

General:

- Crime in Chicago
- Italians in Chicago
- List of Italian Mafia crime families

== Sources ==
=== Books ===
- Binder, John (2003). The Chicago Outfit. Arcadia Publishing. ISBN 0-7385-2326-7.
- Burnstein, Scott M.; Giancana, Sam (2010). Family Affair: Treachery, Greed, and Betrayal in the Chicago Mafia. Penguin Publishing Group. ISBN 978-0425228319.
- Coen, Jeff (2010). Family Secrets: The Case That Crippled the Chicago Mob. Chicago Review Press. ISBN 9781569765456.
- Cooley, Robert (2004). When Corruption Was King: How I Helped the Mob Rule Chicago, Then Brought the Outfit Down. Hachette Books. ISBN 0-7867-1583-9.
- Cooley, Will (2017). "Jim Crow Organized Crime: Black Chicago's Underground Economy in the Twentieth Century", in Building the Black Metropolis: African American Entrepreneurship in Chicago, Robert Weems and Jason Chambers, eds. Urbana: University of Illinois Press, 147–170. ISBN 978-0252082948.
- Demaris, Ovid (1969). Captive City: Chicago in Chains. Lyle Stuart, Inc.
- Lombardi, Mark; Richards, Robert Carleton & Hobbs, Judith Richards (2003). Mark Lombardi: Global Networks. Independent Curators. ISBN 0-916365-67-0. (Published for the traveling exhibition of Lombardi's work, Mark Lombardi Global Networks).
- Nolan, John Matthew. 2,543 Days: A History of the Hotel at the Grand Rapids Dam on the Wabash River.
- Russo, Gus (2002). The Outfit: The Role of Chicago's Underworld in the Shaping of Modern America. Bloomsbury USA. ISBN 1-58234-279-2.
- Tereba, Tere (2012). Mickey Cohen : the life and crimes of L.A.'s notorious mobster. Toronto, Ont.: ECW Press. ISBN 978-1-4596-5049-7. OCLC 1016454937.
