= Anthony Zizzo =

American mobster (1935–2006)

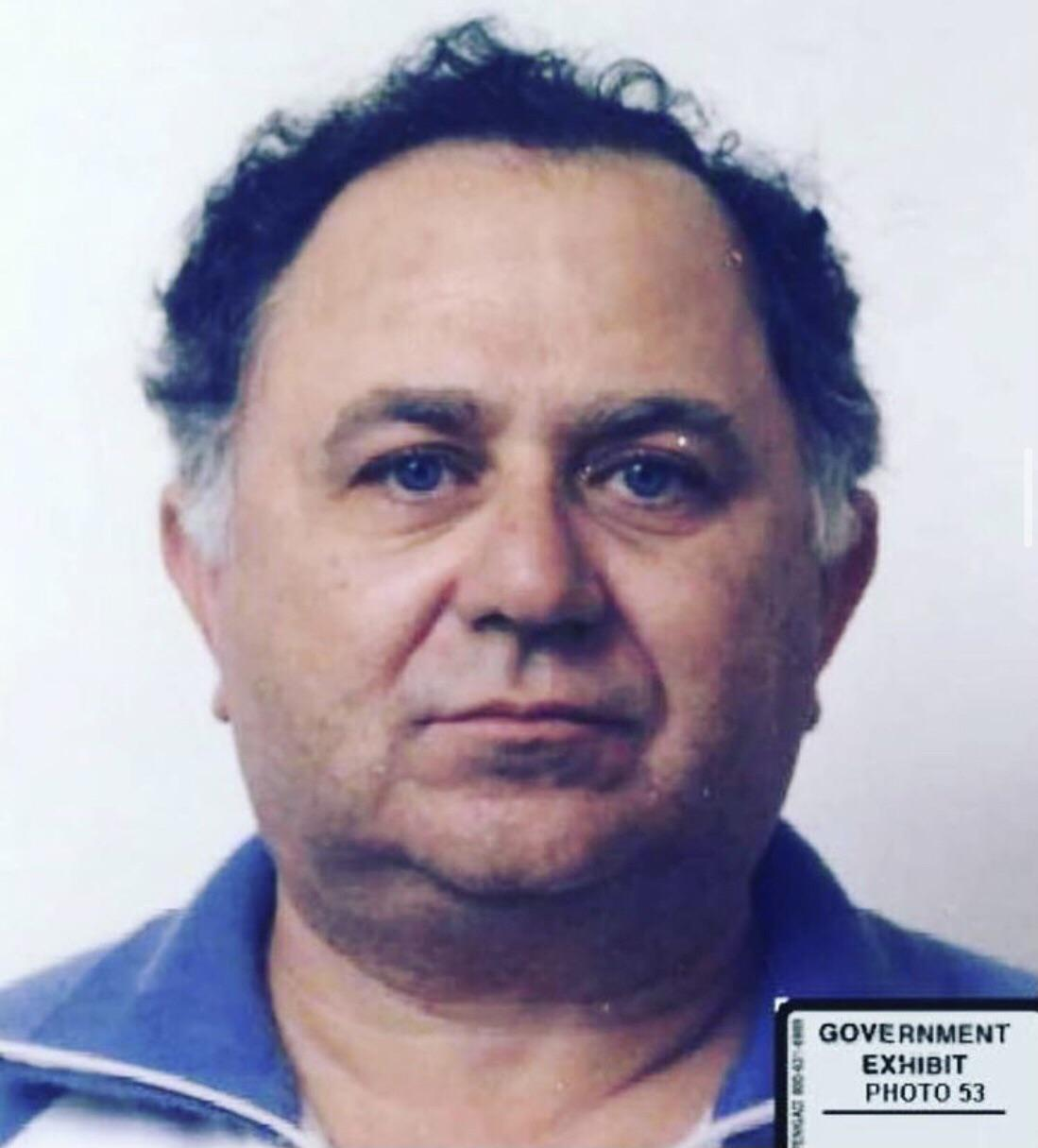
- Zizzo's mugshot
- Born: Anthony Zizzo; August 3, 1935; Chicago, Illinois, U.S.
- Disappeared: August 31, 2006 (aged 71); Melrose Park, Illinois, U.S.
- Status: Missing for 20 years and 11 days
- Other names: "Little Tony"; "Little Toes"
- Occupation: Mobster
- Height: 5 ft 3 in (1.60 m)
- Spouse: Susan Zizzo
- Allegiance: Chicago Outfit

Anthony Zizzo (born August 3, 1935 – disappeared August 31, 2006), also known as "Little Tony" and "Little Toes", was an American mobster who was the underboss of the Chicago Outfit.

== Early life ==
Anthony Zizzo was born on August 3, 1935, in the Little Italy neighborhood of Chicago, Illinois. His parents were Italian immigrants who had settled in the United States. Zizzo grew up in a working-class family, and like many young men in his neighborhood, he became involved in organized crime at a young age.

Zizzo dropped out of high school and began working as a truck driver for the Chicago Outfit, the city's dominant organized crime syndicate. He quickly rose through the ranks of the organization, and by the 1960s, he was a trusted member of the Outfit's leadership.

Throughout the 1970s and 1980s, Zizzo was involved in a number of high-profile criminal activities, including illegal gambling, loan sharking, and extortion. Despite his criminal activities, Zizzo managed to stay out of prison for much of his career, and he was known for his intelligence and cunning in the criminal underworld.

== Carlisi Street Crew ==
Zizzo was third in command of the Carlisi Street Crew.

In 1992, Zizzo and 10 other Carlisi Street Crew members were prosecuted by the Justice Department for racketeering.

== Disappearance ==
Zizzo disappeared after leaving his home on August 31, 2006, he was last seen outside a Melrose Park restaurant where his car was found after a missing person's report was made by his wife. He is presumed murdered, although the FBI also considered the possibility he went into hiding.

=== Investigation ===
Theories on why Zizzo may have been targeted include fears he might testify against the Outfit as well as an ongoing feud with powerful captain Michael Sarno, whom he was supervising.

At the time of his disappearance, law enforcement believed Zizzo was the underboss of the Chicago Outfit as he was third in command in the 1990s. The FBI considers Joseph Andriacchi a prime suspect in the 2006 disappearance and presumed murder of Zizzo, and offered a $10,000 reward in 2016 for information that would help to solve the crime. Andriacchi died in August 2024.

== See also ==
- List of people who disappeared mysteriously (2000–present)
