= Michael Sarno =

American mobster

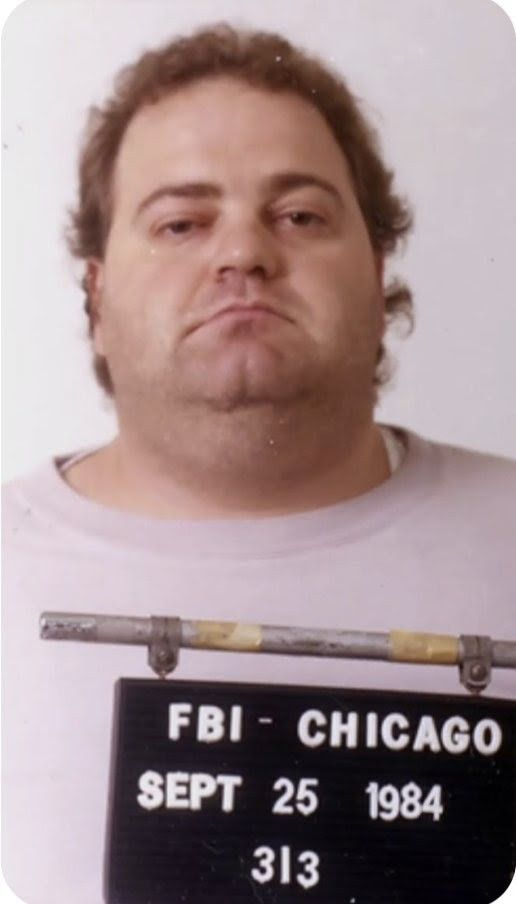
- Sarno's September 25, 1984 FBI mugshot
- Born: January 7, 1958 (age 68); Chicago, Illinois, U.S.
- Occupation: Mobster
- Allegiance: Chicago Outfit
- Convictions: Racketeering and illegal gambling (1992); Extortion (1996); Racketeering (2010)
- Penalty: Six and a half years' imprisonment (1993); 27 months' imprisonment 25 years' imprisonment (2012)

Michael Sarno (born January 7, 1958) is an American mobster who has been identified as the alleged, current leader of the Cicero street crew in the Chicago Outfit crime family. On February 8, 2012, Sarno was sentenced to 25 years in prison on racketeering charges.

== Criminal career ==
=== Indictments and first imprisonment ===
On February 7, 1990, Sarno was one of 20 Chicago mobsters named in a 42-count indictment alleging racketeering. Sarno was jailed immediately but in an unusual move, was furloughed for several hours the following weekend to get married. Among the other defendants charged with various crimes in the same indictment were Chicago Outfit leaders Harry Aleman and Rocco Infelice.

Sarno was identified in the indictment as a mob money collector of extortion payments and juice loans and the owner of a tavern in Cicero, Illinois. During hearings on whether to give Sarno bond, federal investigators also reported him to have severely beaten a rival and acquaintance, Michael Giamarusti, whom Sarno had caught sleeping in Sarno's fiancée's apartment in May 1989. An FBI agent testified that Giamarusti had required several stitches and dental work after Sarno beat him.

On February 15, 1990, Sarno was ordered held without bond. On May 15, 1990, however, Sarno was one of four defendants in the trial who was permitted by then-United States District Judge Ann Claire Williams to go free on bond. In January 1992, Sarno was convicted on charges of racketeering and running an illegal gambling operation, and on August 18, 1993, Sarno was sentenced to 6 1/2 years in prison for those crimes.

On January 22, 1993, Sarno was one of seven individuals indicted by federal officials in a separate indictment on additional extortion charges. Sarno was permitted to remain free pending a $100,000 cash and real estate bond posted in May 1990. Sarno was convicted of those charges and in 1996 was sentenced to 27 months in federal prison—18 months of which were to be served concurrently with his earlier sentence.

Sarno was released from federal prison on October 20, 1999.

=== Release from prison ===
In September 2004, the Chicago Sun-Times reported that Sarno became the leader of a mob street crew once led by Ernest Rocco Infelice, an assertion that Sarno's attorney deemed "a joke."

In September 2007, after the convictions of a slew of Chicago-area mobsters in the Family Secrets trial, Sarno was identified by law enforcement sources in the Chicago Sun-Times as being a powerful reputed mobster in the Chicago Outfit, along with Joseph Andriacchi, Al Tornabene, Marco D'Amico and John DiFronzo.

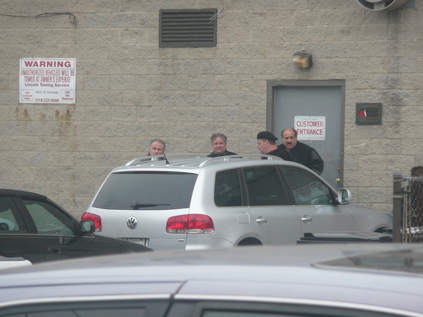
From left, Nicholas Cataudella, Frankie "Smalls" Damato, Michael Sarno and Salvatore Cataudella.

In the summer of 2008, Sarno's house in Westchester, Illinois was among the locations raided by federal agents investigating a February 23, 2003, pipe-bombing incident outside of a Berwyn, Illinois video and vending machine business.

Sources told the Chicago Tribune that Sarno was the target of the search and that a large amount of cash was recovered during the investigation. Sarno was referred to in the indictment of two men, Samuel Volpendesto and Mark Polchan, in connection with the crime as "Outfit Member A." Sarno also was referred to by Volpendesto on undercover tapes that federal investigators had made as "the Large Guy"—a reference to Sarno's large size.

In September 2008, Chicago Sun-Times reporter Steve Warmbir wrote, "this [investigation] appears to possibly be building toward a reputed high-level mobster, Mike Sarno." Federal investigators have referred to Sarno as "Outfit Member A" in court filings related to the pipe bombing. He also has been referred to as "Big Mike", "Large", and "The Large Guy".

=== Second imprisonment ===
On May 28, 2009, Sarno was indicted by the federal government and accused of leading an illegal gambling ring and playing a key role in the 2003 pipe-bombing incident. Six others, including 85-year-old Volpendesto, also were charged with racketeering conspiracy. The ring was accused of pulling off jewelry heists, stealing cars, committing arson, intimidating witnesses, and bombing a competitor's video poker business. All together, the crew allegedly oversaw nine robberies and thefts that yielded more than $1.8 million.

On December 22, 2010, Sarno was convicted on racketeering charges related to the illegal gambling ring and playing a role in the 2003 pipe bombing. At that point, Sarno's bond was revoked, and he was imprisoned in Chicago's Metropolitan Correctional Center.

On February 8, 2012, U.S. District Judge Ronald A. Guzman sentenced Sarno to 25 years in prison on the racketeering charges.

Sarno is currently incarcerated in the U.S. Medical Center for Federal Prisoners in Springfield, Missouri with a projected release date of 2032. In August 2020, Sarno filed a petition for compassionate release, arguing that the spread of COVID-19 within the prison system was a threat to his life, however, the following month a federal judge denied his request.
