= Michael Magnafichi =

Michael G. Magnafichi
- Born: February 16, 1962 (age 64)
- Other names: Mike Mags, Good Looking Mike
- Spouse: Karen Tobin (divorced)
- Children: Michael E. Magnafichi

Michael Magnafichi is a member of the Chicago Outfit, an Italian-American organized crime syndicate based in Chicago, Illinois. He is the son of Lee Magnafichi, who also was a member of the Outfit, supposedly working under John "Jackie The Lackey" Cerone. Michael would later become Jackie Cerone's personal driver.

In a declassified 2002 FBI memorandum, Magnafichi was identified as one of the principal threats to the safety of mob turncoat Nick Calabrese, a cooperating witness in the Operation Family Secrets trial.

Some sources claim that Michael, along with Rudy Fratto, was or still is an Elmwood Park street boss under Peter DiFronzo, brother of Outfit leader John DiFronzo. However, an in-depth interview of Michael Magnafichi by Outfit historian Joseph Fosco in 2011 suggested that Michael had not been actively involved with the Outfit for years.

In 2013, Michael, who spent years running book for the Chicago Outfit, began producing a sports podcast.
