= Leonard Patrick =

Jewish-American organized crime figure (1913-2006)

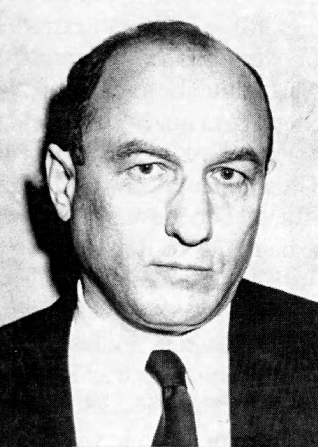
- Born: October 6, 1913; Chicago, Illinois, U.S.
- Died: March 1, 2006 (aged 92); Chicago, Illinois, U.S.
- Occupation: Mobster
- Allegiance: Chicago Outfit

Leonard "Lenny" Patrick (October 6, 1913 – March 1, 2006) was Jewish-American organized crime figure affiliated with the Italian-American Chicago Outfit. Along with his partner David Yaras, he was one of the most active of the organized crime hitmen during the 1940s till the 1960s. Together with Yaras, he rose to become the leader of Jewish organized crime in Chicago. Patrick was involved in bookmaking and extortion, later becoming the highest-ranking organized crime informant in Chicago up until that time.

== Biography ==
=== Early life ===
Patrick was born on 6 October 1913 in Chicago, Illinois. He was the son of Morris and Ester Patrick, both Jewish immigrants from England. His mother died when he was five, leaving his father unable to care for Patrick and his three brothers. They were placed in the care of an orphanage. He attended Shepard Grammar School, which he left after completing the seventh grade. He then got a job as a delivery boy.

Patrick's family history had a criminal streak. His uncle, Meyer Mackenberg, had been arrested along with sixteen others after the murder of Octavius C. Granady. Another uncle, Jack Patrick, was a wanted bank robber who was shot by Patrick's father Morris. Patrick's own brother, Charles, was shot by the police outside of a brothel. The police claimed that Charles had attempted to rob the building, but Patrick's father insisted that law enforcement had planted a gun on Charles and that Charles had been there only because he was demanding that the brothel pay for treatment of a venereal disease he had contracted from the brothel.

=== Criminality ===
In April 1932 Herman Glick was shot outside of a synagogue in Lawndale, Chicago. Before he died from his wounds Glick named Patrick as his killer. When the police succeeded in finding Patrick he refused to open his apartment door until the police started firing through it. Patrick was taken to Cook County Jail and brought before a grand jury which decided that there was not enough evidence to indict him for the murder.

Patrick was sentenced to 10 years in prison on June 28, 1933 for robbing a bank in Culver, Indiana. He was held at the Indiana State Reformatory before being transferred to the Indiana State Penitentiary on 22 February 1933. Patrick was paroled on 11 March 1940. He underwent a psychological evaluation, with a prison psychologist labelling him a "high-grade moron" with an IQ of 72.3.

Patrick's partner in crime was his fellow Jewish Chicagoan, David Yaras. They were particularly close, so much so that Yaras named one of his sons after Patrick. Lenny Yaras would go on to become one of Patrick's lieutenants. On 14 January 1944 Benjamin "Zukie the Bookie" Zuckerman, the boss of an independent gang in Lawndale, Chicago was murdered, with Yaras and Patrick considered the likely culprits. On 24 January 1946, Yaras, Patrick and William Block ambushed James Ragen at an intersection. They hid behind crates of fruit inside a stolen truck before firing at Ragen with shotguns when his car stopped at a traffic light. Both of Ragen's bodyguards were injured and Ragen himself was rushed to hospital where he later succumbed to his wounds. On 8 March 1947 all three were indicted on the charge of murdering Ragen. One witness named Yaras and Block as the shooters and Patrick as the getaway driver. Although on 3 April 1947 the indictment was dropped after one of the three witnesses was murdered and the two others refused to testify. The same trio would also be arrested for the shotgunning of Theodore Roe in August 1947. Yaras and Patrick were also suspected of involvement in the 1947 murder of Bugsy Siegel. He would later confess to the murders of Harry Krotish in 1948, Eddie Murphy in 1950, David Zatz in 1952, and Milton Glickman in 1953, all gambling rivals of Patrick.

Patrick had local political and police connections. In February 1956 an informant told the FBI that Patrick was paying off local politician Arthur X. Elrod and another said he had "strong police protection". He would later admit to bribing police officers, Elrod and other aldermen whose names he said he could not recall. In April 1961 he attended the wedding of Linda Lee, Chicago boss Tony Accardo's daughter, and Michael Palermo.

Yaras and Patrick were suspects in the murder of Alderman Benjamin F. Lewis in February 1963, after the FBI received a tip from an informant that the duo had killed Lewis. Patrick was reportedly running a horse race betting operation out of Lawndale Restaurant, down the street from Lewis's constituency office. However neither were charged or even spoken to by the police and the murder remains unsolved to this day. The FBI considered Patrick as "undoubtedly responsible" for the murder of his one-time gambling partner Arthur "Boodie" Cowan, who was found in the trunk of his own car in 1967.

On 10 September 1975 Patrick was convicted of contempt of court when he refused to testify under immunity against a police officer in the Chicago PD who was accused of tax evasion. He was sentenced to 4 years in prison. On 3 July 1978, after serving 21 months, he was let out on parole under the supervision of a halfway house.

==== Government informant and imprisonment ====
Patrick was under investigation by William F. Roemer Jr. of the FBI. On one occasion Patrick sought a meeting with Roemer over a breach of their "family pact", whereby they would leave each other's families out of whatever problems they had with one another. Patrick complained that one of the FBI's agents had gone to the mother of a man who his daughter Sharon was to marry and informed her prospective high society mother-in-law of the family her son would be marrying into, as a result the wedding was called off.

In 1992, Patrick agreed to become a government witness following his indictment for racketeering charges. His testimony would result in the conviction of Gus Alex and several other key figures involved in the city's extortion rackets. Up until that point, he was the highest-ranking Chicago mobster to cooperate with authorities. As a warning a small bomb was set off outside the home of his daughter. To establish his credibility as a witness, Patrick confessed to six murders, although the number is believed to be far higher. When asked during the trial if he had killed any other people he replied that he had not, as "I run out of cemeteries". In return for his cooperation, he was given a seven-year sentence and sent to Sandstone federal prison in Minnesota.

Patrick's imprisonment and his turning government witness did not stop Chicago prosecutors from indicting him for three murders in Cook County in February 1994. However in 1996, after undergoing examination by doctors who observed signs of dementia, Patrick was ruled unfit to stand trial and the charges were dismissed. He was released in 1998, he refused to enter the witness protection program and lived out the rest of his days in Chicago.

=== Jack Ruby ===
Patrick had an acquaintance with Jack Ruby, the killer of Lee Harvey Oswald. His brother Jack Patrick was married to a distant cousin of Ruby. On 25 November 1963, a day after Ruby assassinated Oswald, Patrick was interviewed by the FBI after they received a tip that Patrick had run Ruby out of Chicago. The FBI interview report, records that Patrick was a "neighbourhood chum" of Ruby and that they attended the same school. It adds that Patrick "frequently saw Rubenstein [Ruby] in the neighbourhood and always spoke with him, as did everyone else who grew up in the West Side", but that they were not close friends. Patrick's denial to the FBI that Ruby was involved in organized crime was among the evidence the Warren Commission, charged with investigating Kennedy's assassination, cited for its assertion that "the evidence does not establish a significant link between Ruby and organized crime".

He claimed that "I never was what you would call running around with him or anything like that. I knew of him. I knew him when he was a kid. He lived in the next block from me". However the House Select Committee on Assassinations determined that Ruby had called Patrick in the summer of 1963.
