= Al Tornabene =

American gangster (1923–2009)

Alfonso "Al the Pizza Man" Tornabene (January 16, 1923 – May 17, 2009) was a Chicago-area resident who was reported by several newspapers to have been a high-ranking member of the Chicago Outfit crime organization.

== Career as a pizzeria owner ==
In 1955, Tornabene opened the Villa Nova pizzeria in Stickney, Illinois. He and his family later expanded the business to three other locations around Chicago. In 2015 and 2020 it was voted as serving Chicago's best pizza.

== Career in the Chicago Outfit ==
Tornabene began his career in the Chicago Outfit as a bookie. However, he never had a criminal record of any kind. He was a long time member of the Chicago Heights street crew.

In 1997, Tornabene was identified by the Chicago Crime Commission in its "New Faces of Organized Crime" book as being a member of the Outfit crime organization. Tornabene was identified as being a lieutenant for the Outfit's West Side Crew, which at that time was run by Anthony Centracchio.

Subsequently, Tornabene was identified as having helped to run the Outfit while its then-boss, James Marcello, was imprisoned between 1992 and 2003.

Court records also showed that Tornabene had presided over a 1983 ceremony that made several mobsters full members of the Outfit, including Frank Calabrese, Sr. and Nicholas Calabrese. Tornabene had presided over the ceremony along with Joseph Aiuppa, Nicholas Calabrese told federal investigators. Several other men were apparently inducted at the ceremony, though due to their age and standing in the organization, they are thought to have been re-inducted.

In 2007, the Chicago Crime Commission's then-chief, James Wagner, told the Chicago Tribune that Tornabene was running the Outfit's activities in Chicago's south suburbs.

In 2009, Tornabene was identified as having been an original target in the Operation Family Secrets mob investigation in 2002, an investigation that ultimately sent Outfit members James Marcello, Joseph Lombardo and Frank Calabrese, Sr. to federal prison for life. However, Tornabene was never charged in the Family Secrets case.

One of Tornabene's associates, Anthony Zizzo, disappeared on August 31, 2006, after leaving his house in Westmont, Illinois. Zizzo's car was abandoned at a restaurant in Melrose Park, Illinois.

== Death ==
Tornabene died on May 17, 2009, at MacNeal Hospital in Berwyn, Illinois, of complications related to peptic ulcer disease.

== Personal ==
Tornabene's wife died in 1988. He was survived by one daughter, a sister and a granddaughter.

Tornabene was reported to be the cousin of Chicago Outfit boss Samuel Carlisi. He also was reported to have been the brother of Frank Tornabene, who was active in Outfit vice rackets.

Tornabene lived for most of his life in Stickney, Illinois.

Contrary to what was reported by ABC news, Al Tornabene was not related by marriage to Rod Blagojevich, nor was he related to Frank Tornabene. Tornabene had 2 brothers (Sam and Roy) and one sister. Roy had 3 kids Carmen Roy and Marie. Roy had a daughter and Carmen had 4 kids Nick Joe Roy and Gina. Joe has to daughters and Nick has a daughter and a son, Vincenzo.
