= Victor Spilotro =

American crime figure

Victor P. Spilotro (October 8, 1933 – December 30, 1996) was an American mobster in the Chicago Outfit. He was the older brother of Outfit soldier Tony Spilotro and Outfit associate Michael Spilotro. Victor Spilotro's activities reportedly became more widely known to the public during the 1980s. He was implicated but never indicted due to lack of evidence in the unsolved murder/disappearance of millionaire heiress Helen Brach.

== Biography ==
Spilotro was born in West Town, Chicago. He was the eldest son of Pasquale Spilotro, Sr. (1899–1954), known as "Patsy", a restaurant owner, and his wife, Antoinette. Pasquale Spilotro, Sr. had emigrated from Triggiano, in the Italian province of Bari in the southeastern region of Apulia, and had arrived at Ellis Island in 1914. He had arrived in America with no money, education, or particular skill, and became the owner of Patsy's Restaurant at 470 North Ogden, which he operated with his wife. Mobsters such as Salvatore "Sam" Giancana, Jackie Cerone ("The Lackey"), Gus Alex and Frank Nitti ("Frank the Enforcer") regularly dined at Patsy's, which was on the west side at Grand Avenue and Ogden Avenue, and its parking lot was used for mob meetings. Whereas most Italian immigrants to Chicago settled around Taylor Street and Halsted Street, a mile from the Loop, the Spilotros lived at 2152 North Melvina Avenue in Belmont Cragin. In 1954, Patsy, Sr. suffered a fatal aneurysm and died at the age of fifty-five, leaving five sons: Vincent, Anthony, Pasquale (known as "Pat"), Michael, and John.

== Childhood ==
Throughout his childhood and adolescence Victor slept with his five brothers in one bedroom in three sets of bunk beds. Like all of his brothers, he was short in stature. Through his brother Anthony he became friends with Frank Cullotta and spent as much time at the Cullotta house as his own. He attended Burbank Elementary School in Belmont Cragin, Chicago, and entered Charles P. Steinmetz Academic Centre in 1946, the same school his brothers Michael, Vincent, Anthony and Pasquale would attend but only Pasquale would graduate. He was a thief with his brothers and Frank and they would ride around frequently in stolen cars. At seventeen and eighteen years old, in 1951, Victor along with his brothers were making roughly $25,000 a week each. He was allegedly linked to figures like Jimmy Torello, Charles Nicoletti, Phil Alderisio, Joseph Lombardo and Joseph Aiuppa. He shared dreams with his brothers Anthony and Michael of not only being a thief, but of one day being a racketeer. He remained very much on the sidelines while his three brothers, Anthony, Michael and John relished the media attention with their criminal activities in Las Vegas. He did not remain close to his younger brothers, Anthony, Michael, John and Vincent who all moved from Oak Park, Illinois in the 1970s to Spring Valley, Nevada. His brother Anthony would later drop out of high school during his sophomore year and transferred to a trade school with Frank Cullotta. Victor Spilotro reportedly dropped out of school after his brothers Anthony and Michael.

Victor's brother, Pasquale, became an oral surgeon and dentist in the Chicago area, and lived a law-abiding life. Tony, John and Michael became criminals like Victor. Pasquale Sr. owned Patsy's Restaurant located at the corner of Grand Avenue and Ogden Avenue. It was a small place famous for its homemade meatballs that attracted people from all over town including Anthony Accardo, Paul Ricca, Sam Giancana, Gus Alex and Jackie Cerone. As a child, he and his brothers grew up in a two-story wooden bungalow just a few blocks from Frank Rosenthal's childhood home. His mother Antoinette was a domineering mother. He did not move to Las Vegas like his brothers and decided to stay in Northbrook, Illinois instead. He married an Italian woman, Mary-Ann, who bore him two children, a son who he named after himself Victor Michael Spilotro, and a daughter Maria.

== Personal attacks against his family ==
Frank Rosenthal said in Casino: Love and Honor in Las Vegas by Nicholas Pileggi about Victor's family, "Lots of time, members of his family were turned down for things just because of his (his brother Anthony and Michael's) reputation, and that really frustrated him. One time, his own brother (Pasquale Spilotro, Jr.) went to get a job at a casino (in Las Vegas, Nevada). I've got to say that his brother was more than qualified. Legitimate. But in forty-eight hours the poor guy got fired because of his last name. The casino owner didn't want to put up with the heat he'd get from the (Nevada Gaming Control Board). Tony went nuts. He's ready to go to war with the casino owner."

== Involvement in the Helen Brach murder ==
Victor was a known associate of Richard Bailey, the owner of Bailey Stables and Country Club Stables who Crime Library describes as a "con artist who specialized in fleecing older women out of their savings by investing in horses and associate of the notorious Jayne Gang, a horse theft ring. Bailey was a live-in chauffeur and houseman for Helen Brach of the Brach's candy company. Brach disappeared on February 17, 1977, in Rochester, Olmsted County, Minnesota. Brach's body has never been found. Richard Bailey was later arrested and charged under the Racketeer Influenced and Corrupt Organizations Act for his involvement in the alleged murder of Helen. Victor and Curtis Hansen were named in investigations regarding the alleged murder. However only Helen Brach's houseman Jack Matlick, was implicated in Brach's disappearance by an eyewitness.

== Convictions and prison ==
In 1980, he was convicted of illegal gambling and tax fraud in connection with a bookmaking operation disguised as a race track messenger service. Spilotro was sentenced to 18 months and was out in 13 months. He would later work with capos such as Albert Tocco.

In 1986, Tony and Michael were found buried in an Indiana cornfield. A year later, at the age of 54, he was officially inducted as a "Made" member of the Chicago Outfit. Some mob historians and law enforcement reports suggest that Victor may have been aware of James Marcello's alleged involvement in his brothers' murders.

In 1987, Victor was tried on fraud and extortion charges, accused of accepting $40,000 in protection money between 1981 and 1984 from the National Credit Card Service, an illegal credit card company that processed payments made to prostitutes. The firm actually was set up by the Federal Bureau of Investigation (FBI) in a probe of vice in suburban Chicago. Spilotro, fifty-two, was found guilty, but received a light sentence from a judge who commented, "It is a troublesome case. If your name wasn't Spilotro, you wouldn't be here." On July 17, 1987, Victor was sentenced to six months of work release and five years probation.

Spilotro died on December 30, 1996, in a Wheeling, Illinois health care facility.
