= Michael Spilotro =

American mobster

- Born: Michael Peter Spilotro; September 12, 1944; Chicago, Illinois, U.S.
- Died: June 14, 1986 (aged 41); Bensenville, Illinois, U.S.
- Cause of death: Blunt force trauma
- Body discovered: June 22, 1986; Enos, Indiana, U.S.
- Resting place: Queen of Heaven Cemetery, Hillside, Illinois, U.S.
- Other name: "Micky"
- Spouse: Anne Spilotro
- Relatives: Vincent, Victor, Pasquale, Anthony and John (brothers)
- Allegiance: Chicago Outfit

Michael Peter "Micky" Spilotro (September 12, 1944 – June 14, 1986) was the younger brother of Anthony "Tony the Ant" Spilotro and was an associate of the Chicago organized crime organization referred to as "The Outfit".

== Family background ==
Michael was born in Chicago, Illinois, on September 12, 1944. He was the son of Pasquale Spilotro, Sr. (1899–1954), a restaurant owner, and his wife, Antoinette. Michael had five brothers, Vincent, Victor, Pasquale "Pat" Jr., Tony and John.

He attended Burbank Elementary School in Austin, Chicago, and entered Charles P. Steinmetz Academic Centre in 1953 with his brothers Victor, Vincent, Anthony and Pasquale. Michael attended (what is now) Providence St. Mel School in East Garfield Park, Chicago from 1958 to 1962.

His parents, Pasquale Spilotro, Sr. (who emigrated from Triggiano, Italy and arrived at Ellis Island in 1914) and Antoinette Spilotro (who was a domineering mother), owned Patsy's Restaurant. Unlike most Italian immigrants, who settled in "The Patch," (located around Grand and Western Avenues), the Spilotros lived at 2152 North Melvina Avenue in Belmont Cragin, Chicago.

Mobsters such as Salvatore "Sam" Giancana, Jackie "The Lackey" Cerone, Gus Alex and Frank Nitti ("Frank the Enforcer") regularly dined at Patsy's, which was on the west side at Grand and Ogden Avenues, using its parking lot for mob meetings. Patsy's was a small place famous for its homemade meatballs that attracted people from all over town including Anthony Accardo, Paul Ricca, Sam Giancana, Gus Alex and Jackie Cerone.

In 1954, Pasquale, Sr. suffered a fatal aneurysm and died at the age of fifty-five.

His brother Anthony would later transfer to a trade school with Frank Cullotta. Michael graduated high school and shortly began to follow in his older brother Tony's footsteps.

Michael's brother, Pasquale, became an oral surgeon and dentist in the Chicago area, and Vincent lived a law-abiding life.

Tony, John and Victor became criminals like Michael. As a child he and his brothers grew up in a two-story wooden bungalow just a few blocks from Frank Rosenthal's childhood home.

Michael spoke in a dapper Chicago accent and pronounced his vowels flat.

He was married to Anne Spilotro and father to Michelle Spilotro Capozzoli, Paula Spilotro, and Michael Spilotro Jr. (born May 21, 1977).

He had once been arrested for aggravated assault with Rocco Lombardo, the younger brother of future mob boss Joseph Lombardo and Peter Schivarelli, a former University of Notre Dame football player, but the trio was acquitted.

Spilotro's wife and daughter would later testify in 2007 for the prosecution regarding the Spilotro Brothers' involvement with James Marcello.

In 2007, Anne Spilotro testified at the Family Secrets trial about how she reached out to mob boss James Marcello for help and allegedly was swindled after selling her husband's Chicago restaurant to state Democratic Senator James DeLeo and attorney James Banks, the nephew of Chicago's 36th Ward Alderman William Banks. Upon hearing the allegations, DeLeo expressed amazement at her complaint to reporters. DeLeo said he and James Banks converted the restaurant into a pizza parlor that later failed.

== Bit-part Hollywood career ==
Michael was friends with actor Robert Conrad and, through Conrad, also became close friends with Robert's fellow Hollywood actor Larry Manetti (one of the supporting stars of Magnum P.I.) and his wife Nancy DeCarl. In a 2008 interview, Conrad described Michael Spilotro as his "best friend".

Michael first met Robert Conrad in May 1954, when Robert was only 19 years old. At the time, Conrad had eloped with a lawyer's daughter and lied about his age to gain employment as a longshoreman on the Chicago waterfront. He was later fired in December of that year for handing out a petition to have his union steward fired. The two remained close and Michael later appeared as a stick-up man in Conrad's TV series The Duke in 1979. On the Internet Movie Database (IMDb) website, Michael is labeled as a dramatic actor. Through Conrad, he became close with actors Patrick Wayne, Dennis Hopper and Nick Adams. He later was featured in Will: The Autobiography of G. Gordon Liddy, released in 1982, and with Tom Selleck in the first season of the TV series Magnum, P.I., in the episode 12 entitled "Thicker Than Blood", as an armed federal marshal.

After temporarily moving to Las Vegas shortly before his death, in order to tend to his indictment in the months-long Hole in the Wall Gang trial, Michael allegedly helped run a local jewelry store called The Goldrush Ltd, with Anthony and his other brother John, who worked as a bookmaker. Michael soon became involved in bookmaking, drug dealing, prostitution, robbery, and extortion. Through his relationship with Larry Manetti, he had connections in the Plaza Hotel & Casino, when it was under the ownership of the Barrick Gaming Corporation. Lifelong friend and fellow actor Larry Manetti told reporters from the Chicago Tribune during the Family Trial, "I didn't know Michael was a gangster. I knew him as a guy I grew up with in the neighborhood. Michael wanted to be on TV, that's all. Who wouldn't?... He wasn't trying to be a movie star or an actor, he was having fun." Manetti commented to reporters about Michael's acting ability stating, "He was OK as an actor, he wasn't so stiff." Robert Conrad attended funerals of the Spilotro family, and made no effort to hide his appearances from the press there. There was no attempt on the part of either Robert Conrad or Larry Manetti to attend the funerals of Anthony or Michael. He didn't appear publicly with either brother, even when they were alive. Conrad attempted to keep his association sub rosa also. When he encountered a bus load of tourists when Anthony Spilotro's Monte Carlo automobile collided with it, he quickly left before attention could be drawn.

== The Hole In The Wall Gang ==
Spilotro, in 1978, formed a burglary ring with his brother Anthony and Herbert Blitzstein, utilizing about eight associates as burglars. The crew became known as the Hole in the Wall Gang because of its penchant for gaining entry by drilling through the exterior walls and ceilings of the buildings they burglarized. The Hole in the Wall Gang operated out of The Gold Rush, Ltd.

Other gang members included his younger brother John Paul Spilotro, Polish-American brothers Peanuts Pancsko, Butch Pancsko and Pops Pancsko, Frank DeLegge, French-Canadian Michael LaJoy, Joseph D'Argento, Swedish-American Gerald Tomasczek, Peter Basile of Wilmette, Illinois, Carl Urbanotti of Chicago, Illinois, Ernest Lehnigg of Addison, Illinois, Samuel Cusumano, Joseph Cusumano, Ernesto "Ernie" Davino, 34, Las Vegas, "Crazy Larry" Neumann, Wayne Matecki, Salvatore "Sonny" Romano, Leonardo "Leo" Guardino, 47, Las Vegas, Frank Cullotta, 43, Las Vegas, and former Las Vegas Sheriff's Department Detective, Joseph Blasko, 45, Las Vegas, who acted as a lookout and who later worked as a bartender at the Crazy Horse Too, a gentleman's club, and died of a heart attack in 2002.

Following the botched burglary at Bertha's Household Products on July 4, 1981, Cullotta, Blasko, Guardino, Davino, Neumann, and Matecki were arrested and each charged with burglary, conspiracy to commit burglary, attempted grand larceny and possession of burglary tools. They were locked into the Las Vegas police department's holding cell in downtown Las Vegas. The only members of Spilotro's gang not arrested for the July 4 burglary were Blitzstein, Michael Spilotro, Romano and Cusumano. Meanwhile, Cullotta had turned state's witness, testifying against Anthony and to a lesser extent Michael Spilotro. But the testimony was insufficient, and Michael was acquitted and Tony Spilotro had a mistrial.

== Death ==
Spilotro and his brother Anthony disappeared on June 14, 1986, after they drove away together from Michael's Oak Park home. Michael's wife, Anne, reported both brothers missing on June 16. Michael's car, a 1986 Lincoln, was recovered several days later in a motel parking lot near O'Hare International Airport. On June 22, their bodies were found, one on top of the other and stripped down to their undershorts, buried in a cornfield in the Willow Slough preserve near Enos, Indiana. The freshly turned earth had been noticed by a farmer who thought that the remains of a deer killed out of season had been buried there by a poacher, and notified authorities. An autopsy completed on June 24, identified their cause of death by blunt force trauma, and had been dead since June 14. They were identified by dental charts supplied by their dentist brother, Patrick Spilotro. The two were buried in a family plot at Queen of Heaven Cemetery in Hillside, Illinois on June 27.

In January 1986, in the wake of the imprisonment of Joseph Aiuppa and John Cerone for skimming Las Vegas casino profits, a meeting was held at the Czech Lodge in North Riverside, Illinois. Most of the "upper echelon" were there, including Outfit boss Tony "Joe Batters" Accardo. Accardo had decided to appoint Samuel Carlisi as the "Street Boss" in charge of Outfit operations to replace Aiuppa. Carlisi told the group that Accardo would stay on as consigliere and would have final say, as well as Gus Alex staying head of the connection guys. He then went on to the first problem: Spilotro, and how things had gone down since he took over Vegas. Mobster and mob enforcer Rocco Infelice said, "Hit him." Everyone else at the meeting agreed. Spilotro was replaced in Las Vegas by Donald "The Wizard of Odds" Angelini.

Although the original reports stated the Spilotros were beaten and buried in the Enos, Indiana, cornfield, mobster Nicholas Calabrese testified at the "Operation Family Secrets" in 2007 that the brothers were killed in a Bensenville, Illinois, basement where the Spilotros believed Michael would be inducted into The Outfit, then transported to the cornfield. According to court testimony, when Tony entered the basement and realized what was about to occur, he asked if he could "say a prayer".

No arrests were made until April 25, 2005, when 14 members of the Chicago Outfit (including reputed boss James Marcello) were indicted for 18 murders, including the Spilotros. The suspected murderers included capo Albert Tocco from Chicago Heights, Illinois, who was sentenced to 200 years in prison in 1990, after his wife testified against him. She testified that in 1986 she drove her husband from an Indiana cornfield where he told her he had just buried Spilotro. Another suspect in the murders was Frank "The German" Schweihs, a convicted extortionist and alleged Chicago assassin who was suspected of involvement in several murders including the Spilotros, Allen Dorfman (of the Teamster's Pension Fund), and a former girlfriend. Schweihs was arrested by the FBI on December 22, 2005. At the time, he was a fugitive living in a Berea, Kentucky apartment complex. Schweihs had slipped away before prosecutors were able to arrest him and 13 others, including Marcello.

On May 18, 2007, the star witness in the government's case against 14 Chicago mob figures, Nicholas Calabrese, pleaded guilty to taking part in a conspiracy that included 18 murders, including the hits on Anthony and Michael Spilotro. Under heavy security, Calabrese admitted that he took part in planning or carrying out 14 of the murders, including the Spilotro killings. He became the key witness against his brother, Frank Calabrese, Sr., and other major mob figures charged in the government's Family Secrets Trial. Calabrese agreed to testify after the FBI showed him DNA evidence linking him to the murder of fellow hit-man John Fecarotta, who was also allegedly involved in the Spilotro slayings.

In September 2007, Frank Calabrese, Sr. and four other men − Marcello, Joseph Lombardo, Paul "The Indian" Schiro, and former Chicago police officer Anthony "Twan" Doyle − were convicted of mob-related crimes. On September 27, 2007, Marcello was found guilty by a federal jury in the murders of both Spilotro brothers. On February 5, 2009, Marcello was sentenced to Life imprisonment for the Spilotro murders, and United States District Judge James Zagel, agreeing with the presentation made by federal prosecutor Markus Funk, also found Marcello responsible for the D'Andrea murder as well, even though the jury had deadlocked on that count. On March 26, 2009, Nicholas Calabrese was sentenced to 12 years and four months imprisonment.

== In popular culture ==
The character Dominick "Dom" Santoro in the 1995 film Casino is based on Michael Spilotro, and played by Philip Suriano. Dominick is shown assisting his older brother Nicky and his crew in beating up a man outside a bar, spitting in a police officer's sandwich, and later shooting up a cop's home in revenge for the death of a crew member. In the infamous cornfield scene at the film's climax, Dominick is the first of the brothers to be brutally beaten by Frank Marino and the rest of their crew while Nicky is forced to watch. When Nicky pleads for Dominick's life, Marino spitefully lands two particularly vicious blows to Dominick's head, leaving Dominick only barely conscious as he is thrown into the hole to be buried alive with Nicky moments later.

== See also ==
- List of homicides in Illinois § Organized crime
- List of solved missing person cases: 1950–1999

== Sources ==
- The Enforcer: Spilotro-The Chicago Mob's Man in Las Vegas by William F. Roemer, Jr. ISBN 0-8041-1310-6
- Honolulu Star Bulletin Vol. 12 Issue 175 "Maui fest shows film stars under the stars" John Heckathorn
- "Mistress Humiliates Marcello" The Chicago Sun Times Steve Warmbir August 3, 2007
- Doctor At Mob Trial Says Spilotros Beaten To Death by Chicago Associated Press
