= Spilotro =

Spilotro is a surname. Notable people with the surname include:

- Anthony Spilotro (1938–1986), American mobster
- Michael Spilotro (1944–1986), American mobster
- Victor Spilotro (1933–1996), American mobster
