= Argent Corporation =

Las Vegas-based casino company

Argent Corporation was a company in Las Vegas that at one time controlled the Hacienda Hotel/Casino, the Stardust Resort & Casino, the Fremont Hotel and Casino and the casino in the Marina Hotel. The company was owned by Allen R. Glick, a San Diego real estate investor. The name Argent came from the three initials of his name, combined with the first three letters of the word "Enterprises". Over a few years, federal, state and local gaming officials in Nevada confirmed that these casinos were controlled by organized crime families in the Midwest and that a huge skimming operation was conducted within the casinos.

== History ==
Argent was established on April 11, 1974, and on April 30, Argent's two-person board of directors approved a resolution authorizing Glick to borrow unlimited funds from Argent on an unsecured basis. On August 14, 1974, Argent officially gained control of the Recrion Corporation, which then owned the Stardust and Fremont. On August 23, 1974, Argent received a $62.75 million loan from the Teamsters Central States Pension Fund to finance control of Recrion and the casinos. Later that year, another $25 million loan from the pension fund was approved to finance remodeling of the casinos. By 1977, Glick was receiving an annual salary of $389,000 from Argent and the company was entering financial difficulties. In March 1977, Argent defaulted on payments that were due to the Teamsters pension fund and in May the fund foreclosed on some of Argent's property. By late 1977, Argent's working capital deficit had reached $6.1 million.

=== SEC complaint ===
On October 31, 1977, the SEC filed a complaint against Glick and Argent in U.S. District Court in San Diego, seeking an injunctive order and ancillary relief. The complaint from the SEC alleged that Glick and Argent "pursued a deceptive and fraudulent course of business by causing Argent to make approximately $7.5 million in loans to Glick and to private companies that Glick controls." It also alleged that Glick and Argent misrepresented certain facts and failed to disclose material facts.

On May 12, 1980, Argent agreed to not retain Glick as an officer, director, employee or consultant and to take no action that would impair its obligations to the holder of its 1984 debentures, which closed the SEC's complaint against Argent.

The SEC's complaint against Glick was amended to include new charges, including making false statements made about a finder's fee paid to Todd Derlachter in connection with Glick's acquisition of Recrion in 1974 and an arrangement made with Tamara Rand whereby she was to receive 5 percent of Argent upon its acquisition of Recrion. It also charged that Glick made false statements about the impact upon Argent of a renovation program undertaken in 1975–1976. On July 30, 1980, Glick was ordered not to become associated with any public company for a period of 18 months.

=== Organized crime connections ===
After Argent purchased the Stardust, Frank Rosenthal was installed as a manager, although he did not have a Nevada gaming license. The Nevada Gaming Commission refused to license Rosenthal because of his past criminal convictions, and Rosenthal began changing job titles to positions that did not require state licensing. Rosenthal's story was fictionalized in the movie, Casino, where he is played by Robert De Niro. During the time that Argent owned the four casinos, between $7 million and $15 million is estimated to have been skimmed from the casinos and sent to organized crime members in Chicago, Milwaukee, and Kansas City. Argent was forced out of the casino industry in the late 1970s. Glick denied any wrongdoing and was never charged with a crime. He became a cooperating witness, immunized from prosecution in a criminal case in 1983 against 15 individuals charged in the skimming operation. The 15 individuals indicted included many people in the top echelon of organized crime: Joseph Aiuppa, Jackie Cerone, Joseph Lombardo and Anthony Spilotro from the Chicago Outfit; Frank Balistrieri and his two sons from the Milwaukee crime family; and Carl Civella from the Kansas City crime family.

In 1975, two people with business connections to Allen Glick were shot and killed. Tamara Rand lent $500,000 to Glick to help fund his purchase of the Recrion Corporation. She later claimed that this entitled her to a 5% ownership share in Argent. On November 9, 1975, Rand was shot five times with a silencer-equipped .22 caliber gun at her home in San Diego.Jimmy Fratianno later implicated Anthony Spilotro and Frank Bompensiero in the murder of Rand. Edward (Marty) Buccieri was a pit boss at Caesars Palace in Las Vegas who had connections with a number of mobsters. In May 1975, he was found dead in a car after being shot in the head with a .25 caliber gun. Buccieri had demanded a $30,000 finders fee from Glick for his help in obtaining the loan from the Teamsters Pension Fund, and had reportedly physically threatened Glick. Neither homicide was solved.

In 1985, former Teamsters President Roy Lee Williams testified that Nicholas Civella paid him a bribe of $1,500 per month over seven years, starting in 1974, in order to secure his vote for the loan from the Central States Pension Fund to Argent to purchase and remodel casinos. Williams was serving as a pension fund trustee at the time the loan was approved and the payments ended in 1981, when he was elected president of the Teamsters.

== See also ==
- List of defunct gambling companies
