= Mob Attraction Las Vegas =

Multimedia experience

Las Vegas Mob Experience
- Established: March 2011
- Location: Tropicana Hotel

Las Vegas Mob Experience was located at the Tropicana on the Las Vegas Strip. The Las Vegas Mob Experience was a 27,000-square-foot (2,500 m^{2}) interactive tour that chronicled the rise and fall of the Mafia in the Las Vegas Valley, mixing entertainment with history, storytelling, artifacts and technology. Visitors take a journey through the world of organized crime, interacting with live character actors and 3D holograms of famous mob movie icons and celebrity gangsters such as James Caan, Frank Vincent, Tony Sirico and Mickey Rourke.

The Las Vegas Mob Experience also housed a 12,000 square feet (1,100 m^{2}) museum that features original photos, videos, letters the personal belongings of famous gangsters such as, Benjamin "Bugsy" Siegel, Meyer Lansky, Sam Giancana, Tony Spilotro, Mickey Cohen, Charles "Lucky" Luciano and Joey Aiuppa.

== Overview ==
Significant artifacts on display included:

- Benjamin "Bugsy" Siegel - Home movies (only video footage in existence of Ben Siegel), original photos, hand written letters, hand gun
- Meyer Lansky - Diaries, Presidential Medal of Freedom, hand written letters, original photos and home movies, legal documents
- Sam Giancana - Original photo with Frank Sinatra and Phyllis McGuire, Shotgun, original coroner's report after his murder
- Tony Spilotro - Guns & Knives, funeral mass cards, original photos & home videos, original death certificate
- Lucky Luciano - 1927 Studebaker

The attraction was opened as the Las Vegas Mob Experience in March 2011.
