= Geri McGee =

American model and Las Vegas showgirl

- Born: Geraldine McGee; May 16, 1936; Los Angeles, California, U.S.
- Died: November 9, 1982 (aged 46); Los Angeles, California, U.S.
- Resting place: Mount Sinai Memorial Park
- Spouse: Frank Rosenthal (m. 1969; div. 1981)
- Children: 3

Geraldine McGee (May 16, 1936 – November 9, 1982) was an American model and Las Vegas showgirl. Her involvement with casinos and criminal activity in Las Vegas, along with that of her husband Frank "Lefty" Rosenthal, was loosely dramatised in Martin Scorsese's film Casino (1995).

== Personal life and career ==
Geraldine McGee was born in Los Angeles, the daughter of Leona "Alice" (née Pollock) and Roy McGee. Her parents married in 1931 and later divorced. She had a sister, Barbara.

McGee grew up near Sherman Oaks, California, and graduated from Van Nuys High School in the year 1954. Her aunt Naomi Ingram inherited a large amount of money upon the death of her husband O.W. Ingram, whose family owned land in Georgia. Ingram offered to send McGee to Woodbury Business School, where she had sent McGee's sister Barbara. McGee told her aunt she did not want to attend Woodbury but would rather attend a different school, and her aunt refused to pay for any other school but Woodbury. McGee instead began working in office jobs during the day, and looked for contests and modeling jobs on the side.

In high school, McGee met an older student named Lenny Marmor, and the two later became inseparable. Marmor recognized McGee's looks and talent, and he began entering her in swimsuit and dance contests, where she often took home prizes. After they graduated from high school, the couple had a daughter, Robin Marmor, born in 1958.

Soon, Lenny Marmor convinced McGee to move to Las Vegas for more opportunities. Marmor stayed in the city of Los Angeles, and McGee and her daughter moved to Las Vegas. McGee's mother Alice, now separated from Roy McGee, moved to Las Vegas to take care of Robin while McGee was working. Alice suffered from mental illness, which put a strain on Geri and her daughter's home life.

Around 1960, McGee started working as a casino cocktail waitress and a Tropicana chorus showgirl, and continued working through the 1960s, making enough money to buy a house for herself and her family. She worked her way up the Las Vegas social ladder, meeting various businessmen. One of the men she met was Frank "Lefty" Rosenthal.

On May 4, 1969, McGee married Frank Rosenthal and soon had two children with him: a son named Steven, and later a daughter named Stephanie. Rosenthal expected McGee to be a stay-at-home mom while he was out at the Argent casinos working. After a few years, McGee began to resent domestic life, and she started going out at night and drinking. Rosenthal later threatened to divorce McGee, and take custody of the children, leaving her with little money.

The thirteen-year marriage went through a long series of break-ups and reconciliations throughout the 1970s. McGee's mother Alice died in 1977. McGee was rumored to have had an affair with Anthony Spilotro. While Rosenthal acting as an FBI informer became known after his death, a retired FBI agent revealed in 2015 that McGee was also working with the agency; sometimes an agent met separately with both husband and wife on the same night.

Rosenthal and McGee got in physical altercations, and Rosenthal hired private detectives to track her activities. McGee sometimes left Las Vegas, taking trips with their children to Los Angeles or shopping with wives of other Las Vegas businessmen. The divorce from Rosenthal was finalized on January 16, 1981, when McGee was living in Los Angeles. After the divorce, on October 4, 1982, Frank Rosenthal escaped serious injury when a bomb was detonated under his car outside the Tony Roma's Restaurant at 600 East Sahara Avenue in Las Vegas.

== Death ==
McGee died on November 9, 1982, in Los Angeles, aged 46. She was found heavily drugged in the lobby of the Beverly Sunset Hotel on Sunset Boulevard on November 6, and died three days later. Her sister stated she believed McGee had been murdered by the mob who had tried to kill Frank Rosenthal just weeks earlier because perhaps she "knew too much" about the Las Vegas underworld.

The Los Angeles coroner ruled McGee's cause of death was an accidental overdose. The coroner found a lethal combination of cocaine, valium, and whiskey in her system. She was interred at Mount Sinai Memorial Park.

== Casino ==
The screenplay for Casino was written by Nicholas Pileggi and Scorsese, based on Pileggi's biography about McGee and Rosenthal titled Casino: Love and Honor in Las Vegas. Sharon Stone portrayed McGee in the film, with the character's name changed to "Ginger McKenna", and Stone was nominated for the Academy Award for Best Actress for her performance.

The script made many changes to McGee's story. In the film, the Rosenthals only have one daughter, Amy, and in real life, McGee had three children. The script changed the couple's names from Geri McGee and Frank "Lefty" Rosenthal to Ginger McKenna (played by Sharon Stone) and Sam "Ace" Rothstein (played by Robert De Niro), and Lenny Marmor to Lester Diamond (played by James Woods).
