= Willow Slough Fish and Wildlife Area =

Area in Newton County, Indiana

Willow Slough
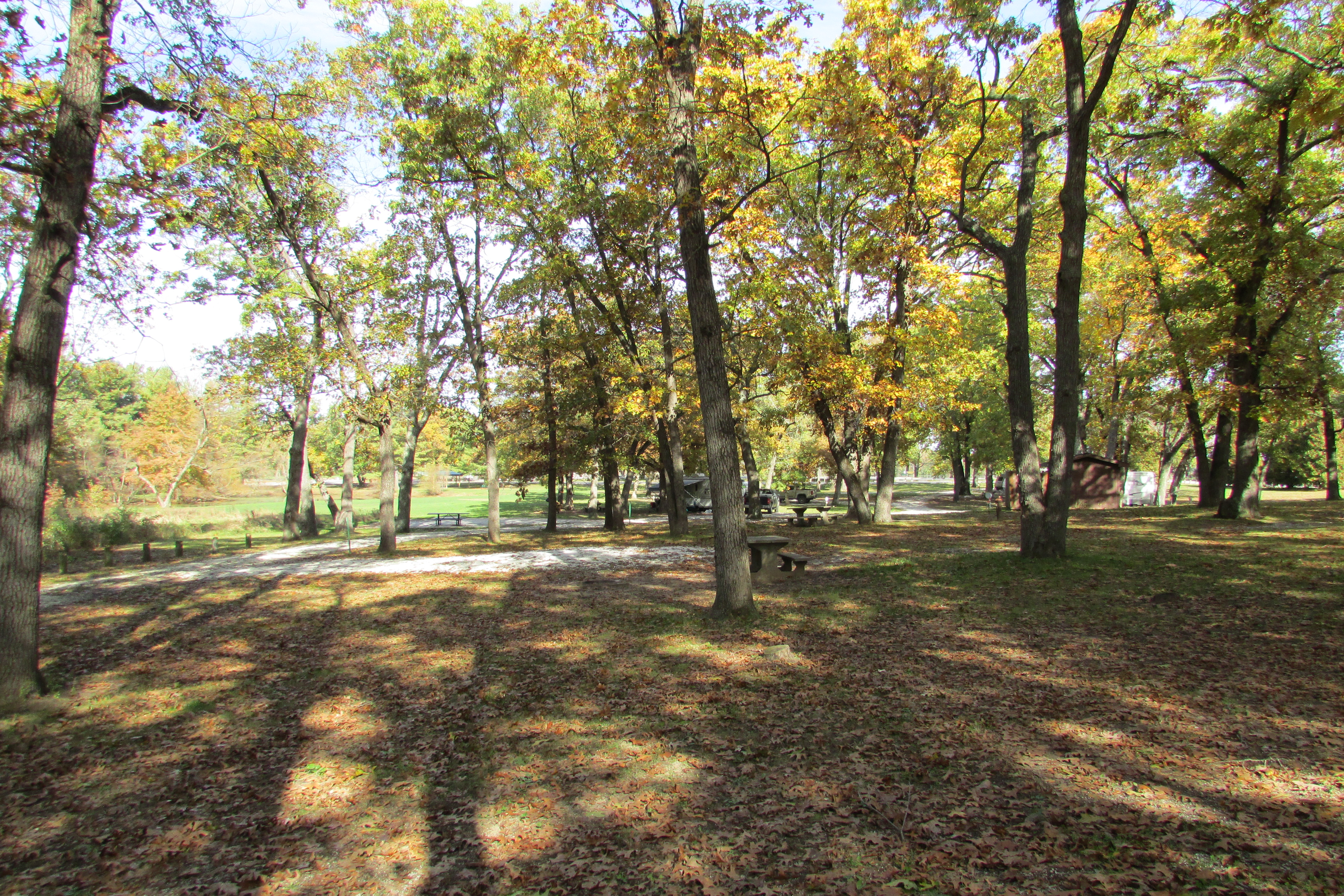
- Willow Slough FWA campground
- Interactive map of Willow Slough
- Type: hunting and fishing, protected wetlands
- Location: 2042 S. 500 W., Morocco, Newton County, Indiana U.S.
- Coordinates: 40°58′39″N 87°31′01″W
- Area: 4,770 acres (1,930.4 ha)
- Created: 1943
- Operator: Indiana DNR
- Facilities: Wildlife Viewing; Picnicking; Ice Fishing; Hunting; Trapping; Shooting Range; Archery Range; Dog Training Area; Boat Ramp (Electric trolling motors only); Dump Station; Camping; 50 non-electric; Primitive sites

Willow Slough Fish and Wildlife Area is an area in Newton County, Indiana dedicated to providing hunting and fishing opportunities while maintaining 9,956 acres (40.29 km^{2}), 1,800 of which are open water, marshes, and flooded crop land.

== History ==
Willow Slough began with the purchase of 7,800 acres (32 km^{2}) of land in 1949. Further purchasing continued to bring the total size of the park to 9,956 acres (40.29 km^{2}). J.C. Murphey Lake, the park reservoir, was completed in 1951. Most parts of Willow Slough were once formerly grazed, hayed, and cultivated. A railroad also ran through the property at one time, and portions of an old train station can still be found in the area. It was also a mob dumping place for bodies in the 1920s-1980s. In 1986 the bodies of Chicago Outfit mobsters Anthony and Michael Spilotro were discovered in the preserve, events later depicted in the film Casino.

== Rules and regulations ==
Besides the state fish and wildlife laws, the property is governed by posted regulations licensed by the Department of Natural Resources. The following regulations are listed below:

- Any violating of the regulations may cause forfeiting for your hunting, fishing, or visiting privileges.
- Must obtain a permit in order to hunt or fish.
- Night and predator hunting is only permitted by daily permit cards from the property manager.
- Camping, picnicking, and open campfires are allowed in designated areas only.
- Target ranges are open to the public on a first-come, first-served basis. All shooters must obey range rules and regulations.

== Fishing ==
Willow Slough provides over 1,200 acres (4.9 km^{2}) of water available for fishing including numerous ponds. No check in is required for fishing, but fishing is prohibited during duck season. Primary species of fish include bass, bluegill, channel catfish, redear sunfish, crappie, and northern pike. Shoreline fishing is available, but only along designated piers. Two boat ramps are provided near the headquarters but may only be launched at the headquarters area.

== Hunting ==
Willow Slough contains a variety of hunting species. These species include deer, quail, rabbit, squirrel, dove, woodcock, waterfowl and wild turkey. Daily check-ins are required for hunting and all hunting seasons and bag limits apply.

== Wildlife Watching ==
9,956 acres (40.29 km^{2}) of varied geography including a 1,200-acre (4.9 km^{2}) lake attract many wildlife species like deer, wild turkey, waterfowl, hawks, owls, osprey, bald eagles, and a variety of songbirds.

== Additional information ==
Besides hunting and fishing, other opportunities include wetland trapping, dog training, and wild fruit gatherings.
