= Mafia! =

- Theatrical release poster
- Directed by: Jim Abrahams
- Written by: Jim Abrahams; Greg Norberg; Michael McManus
- Produced by: Peter Abrams; Robert L. Levy
- Starring: Jay Mohr; Lloyd Bridges; Olympia Dukakis; Christina Applegate; Billy Burke
- Cinematography: Pierre Letarte
- Edited by: Terry Stokes
- Music by: Gianni Frizzelli
- Production companies: Touchstone Pictures; Tapestry Films
- Distributed by: Buena Vista Pictures Distribution
- Release date: July 24, 1998
- Running time: 84 minutes
- Country: United States
- Language: English
- Budget: $10 million
- Box office: $30.1 million

Mafia!, also known as Jane Austen's Mafia!, is a 1998 American crime parody film directed by Jim Abrahams and starring Jay Mohr, Lloyd Bridges (in one of his final films), Olympia Dukakis and Christina Applegate. It was Abrahams’ final directorial effort before his death in 2024.

The film spoofs Francis Ford Coppola's Godfather series and various other mafia films, notably Martin Scorsese's Casino (1995). It also parodies films in other genres, ranging from Forrest Gump to Il Postino and The English Patient.

In the film, a Korean War veteran avenges an assassination attempt on his crime boss father. The veteran subsequently manages a casino in Las Vegas, until surviving another assassination attempt. He sets out to gain vengeance, and to regain the love of his ex-girlfriend. By that point his girlfriend had been elected as the President of the United States, and he has to convince her to postpone her plans for world peace.

== Plot ==
Like the 1974 film The Godfather Part II, the narrative of Mafia! consists of a series of flashbacks interwoven with the main plot. Tony is the son of a prominent Mafia don, Vincenzo Armani Windbreaker Cortino. As the film opens, Tony introduces the main thread when he exits a Vegas casino and walks to his car, accompanied by a voiceover explaining his philosophy of life. When he starts the car, it explodes.

The story then regresses more than half a century to describe the boyhood of Tony's father, Vincenzo, who was born in Italy, the clumsy son of a Sicilian postman. One day, while making a delivery for his father, Vincenzo trips and the parcel bursts open, revealing a strange white powder. The parcel's recipient, concluding that the delivery boy has seen too much, tracks Vincenzo to a street fair, where he kills his father. The boy escapes to America, where he grows to young manhood, marries, and struggles with poverty before finally finding his destiny as a mafia boss.

The film then visits the recent past; Tony has just returned from the Korean War and is bringing his idealistic Protestant girlfriend, Diane, to meet his family and friends at his big brother Joey's wedding reception (a parody of Connie Corleone's wedding in the beginning of the 1972 film The Godfather). During the festivities, however, Vincenzo is shot 47 times in an attempted hit and nearly dies. Tony announces his intention to kill Gorgoni, a drug lord with whom Vincenzo had refused to do business before the attack. Diane leaves him, saying he has abandoned the peaceful ideals of his youth, and adding that she will never be anything to his Sicilian family but "that Protestant chick who never killed anyone." Tony avenges the attack, then goes into hiding in Las Vegas, where Cesar Marzoni offers him the opportunity to manage his casino, The Peppermill. Tony accepts and his casino is a great success until he meets a femme fatale, Pepper Gianini, hired by Marzoni as part of a deep-laid plan to distract him from his duties and to drive a wedge between him and Joey.

Vincenzo recovers from his 47 gunshot wounds and visits Las Vegas, where he officially names Tony his successor. Joey, furious at being passed over, is told "You get Wisconsin." The Don then returns home, where he falls victim to his 5-year-old grandson, Chucky, who assassinates him by spraying him with malathion (parody of Vito Corleone's heart attack in The Godfather). The film returns to the present after Tony catches Joey and Pepper cavorting in a hotel room together and walks out in disgust - only to have his car explode.

Tony is horribly but temporarily disfigured, and attends his father's funeral in a wheelchair, where he spots the killers when he sees little Chucky taking a payoff from a rival Don. However, he decides to postpone vengeance until he can win back Diane's love and put his life in order. Diane has by this time become President of the United States, and is on the brink of declaring total world disarmament when Tony goes looking for her. He persuades her to put world peace on the back burner until after their wedding. During the ceremony, with the help of Vincenzo's Mom Sophia (Dukakis), and Tony's right-hand man Nick "The Eskimo" Molinaro, and a generic henchman, He settles the family's accounts in an orgy of slaughter (filmed similarly to the end of The Godfather), arranging the harpooning of a loathed purple dinosaur as a bonus to all mankind.

== Cast ==
- Jay Mohr as Anthony "Tony" Cortino
- Lloyd Bridges as Vincenzo "Armani Windbreaker" Cortino
  - Louis Mandylor as Young Vincenzo Cortino
  - Jason Fuchs as Vincenzo Cortino As Boy
- Christina Applegate as Diane Steen
- Billy Burke as Joey Cortino
- Pamela Gidley as Pepper Gianini
- Olympia Dukakis as Sophia Cortino
  - Sofia Milos as Young Sophia Cortino
- Joe Viterelli as Dominick Clamato
- Tony Lo Bianco as Cesar Marzoni
- Blake Hammond as Paulie "Fatso Paulie" Orsatti
- Phil Suriano as Frankie Totino
- Vincent Pastore as Gorgoni
- Marisol Nichols as Carla
- Carol Ann Susi as Mrs. Clamato
- Gregory Sierra as Bonifacio
- Catherine Lloyd Burns (uncredited) as Woman In Vegas Show
- Steve Kruth as Lon Cortino
- Deep Roy as Small Hitman

== Release ==
=== Box office ===
In its opening weekend the film took $6,577,961 in 1,942 theatres, averaging $3,387. In total in the US, the film made $19,889,299.

=== Critical reception ===
On the review aggregator Rotten Tomatoes the film holds an approval rating of 15% based on 41 reviews, with an average rating of 4/10. The site's critics consensus reads: "Mafia! promises audiences a spaghetti plate of gangster farce, but only delivers egg noodles and ketchup." Audiences polled by CinemaScore gave the film an average grade of "C" on an A+ to F scale.

James Berardinelli of ReelViews wrote: "Airplane! and The Naked Gun ..., two early entries into what has become a thriving comedy subgenre, worked in large part because the humor was fresh. Now, countless movies later, many of the jokes seem recycled, even when they aren't. ... Mafia! ... has its funny moments, but, in the wake of the hilarious There's Something About Mary, it seems more than a little lame. ... The volume of jokes is extremely high, presumably as a form of insurance—if one fails, maybe the next will succeed. The problem is, Mafia! contains too many duds. And, when you're not laughing, you start to realize how little this film has to offer beyond the diluted humor. ... Mafia! isn't a terrible film, and it will probably provoke at least a burst or two of laughter from even the most grim viewer. On the whole, however, it's a weak parody that is better suited to video viewing than a theatrical experience."

Roger Ebert of the Chicago Sun-Times, who gave the film two out of four stars, wrote:

Yes, I laughed during Jim Abrahams' Mafia!, but even in mid-chortle I was reminded of the gut-busting experience last week of seeing There's Something About Mary. It is the new movie's misfortune to arrive after, instead of before, the funniest comedy of the year. ... Mafia! is the kind of movie that can never entirely fail, but can succeed to various degrees. It doesn't rank with Abrahams' earlier efforts. And in a town where There's Something About Mary is playing, it's not the one to choose.

Owen Gleiberman of Entertainment Weekly wrote:

There are a handful of laughs in Mafia!, but most of the movie feels oddly repressed. ... The underworld gags are limited and repetitive, without the ripely promiscuous media-age lunacy that, in a comedy like The Naked Gun, made you feel as if the film were tickling funny bones you never even knew existed. Jay Mohr, as the Michael Corleone surrogate, and Billy Burke, as his psycho-hothead brother, don't even look the part—they're like preppies clowning in a Harvard spoof—and so the film gets virtually no lift from its performers. ... Still, when Mohr's Anthony Cortino grabs his brother's head and gives him the kiss of death, leaving a bright red smear of lipstick ... well, we may all know this genre's tricks too well by now, but that doesn't mean they can't make you smile.
