= Sandy Smith (journalist) =

Journalist from Chicago

Sandy Smith was a Chicago reporter and investigative journalist. He was described as "the longtime dean of Chicago crime reporters".

== Biography ==
He began reporting on the Chicago Outfit and organized crime in Chicago in 1952 when assigned to do a series of stories on the mob by the Chicago Tribune. In 1960 he and Thomas V. Powers were jointly awarded the Tribune's Edward Scott Beck Award.

He aided the FBI's "Top Hoodlum Program" in Chicago. The FBI took him to the weddings, funerals and wakes of mafiosi in order to identify the attendees, for example he did so at the funeral of Claude Maddox. FBI agent William F. Roemer Jr. described Smith's assistance as "invaluable". He had a relationship of mutual assistance with the FBI. When the FBI developed information which could not be used to prosecute a case or assist them in developing further information, they fed it to Smith who reported it in his papers. On one occasion Smith published a story naming a mistress of an associate of Murray 'The Camel' Humphreys, who called a meeting with Roemer to complain.

Later he worked as a reporter for Chicago Sun-Times and then Life magazine from 1967 to 1969. In 1967 he received a tip from Agent Roemer that Chicago boss Sam Giancana was hiding out in Mexico. He travelled to the country, photographing the house, its golf course and various establishments in the area frequented by Giancana. When these photographs were published in Life, Giancana had to temporarily leave the area.

In the 1980s he moved to Time magazine where he became chief investigative reporter. In 1986 he retired, living out in Annapolis.
