= Steinmetz College Prep =

Public secondary school in Chicago, Illinois, US

Location
- 3030 N. Mobile Avenue; Chicago, Illinois 60634; United States; 41.9356°N 87.7841°W

Information
- School type: Public secondary
- Established: 1934
- School district: Chicago Public Schools
- Principal: Anna Vilchez, PhD.
- Teaching staff: 82.50 (FTE)
- Grades: 9-12
- Gender: Coed
- Enrollment: 1,304 (2022-23)
- Student to teacher ratio: 15.81
- Campus type: Urban
- Colors: Green; Silver
- Athletics conference: Chicago Public League
- Team name: Streaks
- Accreditation: North Central Association of Colleges and Schools
- Website: www.steinmetzcollegeprep.org

Steinmetz College Prep (also known as Steinmetz High School or Steinmetz Academic Centre) is a public four-year high school located in the Belmont Cragin community area on the Northwest Side of Chicago, Illinois. Steinmetz is a part of the Chicago Public Schools district. The school is named for the German-American mathematician and electrical engineer Charles Proteus Steinmetz. The school opened in 1934. Steinmetz is an International Baccalaureate (IB) Programme school. The school has an active Junior Reserve Officers' Training Corps (JROTC).

== History ==
In 1995, the school had 2,237 students, with around equal numbers of black, Hispanic/Latino, and white students, making it the sixth-largest high school in Chicago. That same year, the United States Academic Decathlon team of Steinmetz students and their teacher was involved in a cheating scandal, revealed after winning the Illinois state finals to advance to the national finals. The 2000 television movie Cheaters, based on the scandal, had some scenes filmed (without permission) at Steinmetz.

The 2010 documentary Louder Than a Bomb features a Steinmetz team competing in and winning the 2008 Louder Than a Bomb poetry slam.

In 2016, 22 Steinmetz students participated in the Kakehashi Cultural Exchange Program trip to Japan.

== Athletics ==
Steinmetz competes in the Chicago Public League and is a member of the Illinois High School Association (IHSA). Steinmetz sport teams are nicknamed the Silver Streaks. The boys' baseball team were Public League champions during the 1974 –75 season. The boys' cross country team were Public League champions in the 1949–50 and 1991–92 seasons.

== Notable alumni ==
- Justin Anderson, college football player
- Lisa Boyle, photographer, model for Playboy
- Hannibal Buress, stand-up comedian, actor and television writer
- Nicholas Calabrese, the first made man ever to testify against the Chicago Outfit.
- Tony Canadeo, NFL football player
- Tiny Croft, NFL football player
- Frank Cullotta, mobster
- Ralph Frese, canoe maker and conservationist
- Bob Grant, radio broadcaster
- Hugh Hefner, founder of Playboy Enterprises.
- Joanna Krupa, model
- Fred Marsh, MLB player
- Robert Muczynski, composer
- Lou Possehl, MLB player for the Philadelphia Phillies
- Chuck Schaden, broadcaster
- Danny Seraphine, musician; former drummer and founding member of the band Chicago (attended)
- John Siomos, musician; drummer for Peter Frampton, Carly Simon, and Todd Rundgren
- Anthony Spilotro, Chicago Italian-American mobster and enforcer
- Michael Spilotro, mobster (younger brother of Anthony Spilotro and Victor Spilotro)
- Victor Spilotro, mobster (older brother of Michael and Anthony Spilotro)
- Ray Soden, state senator and national commander of the VFW

More notable alumni are featured each month on the Steinmetz Alumni Association website's Alumni Spotlight feature.
