= Queen of Heaven Cemetery =

Roman Catholic cemetery in Hillside, Illinois

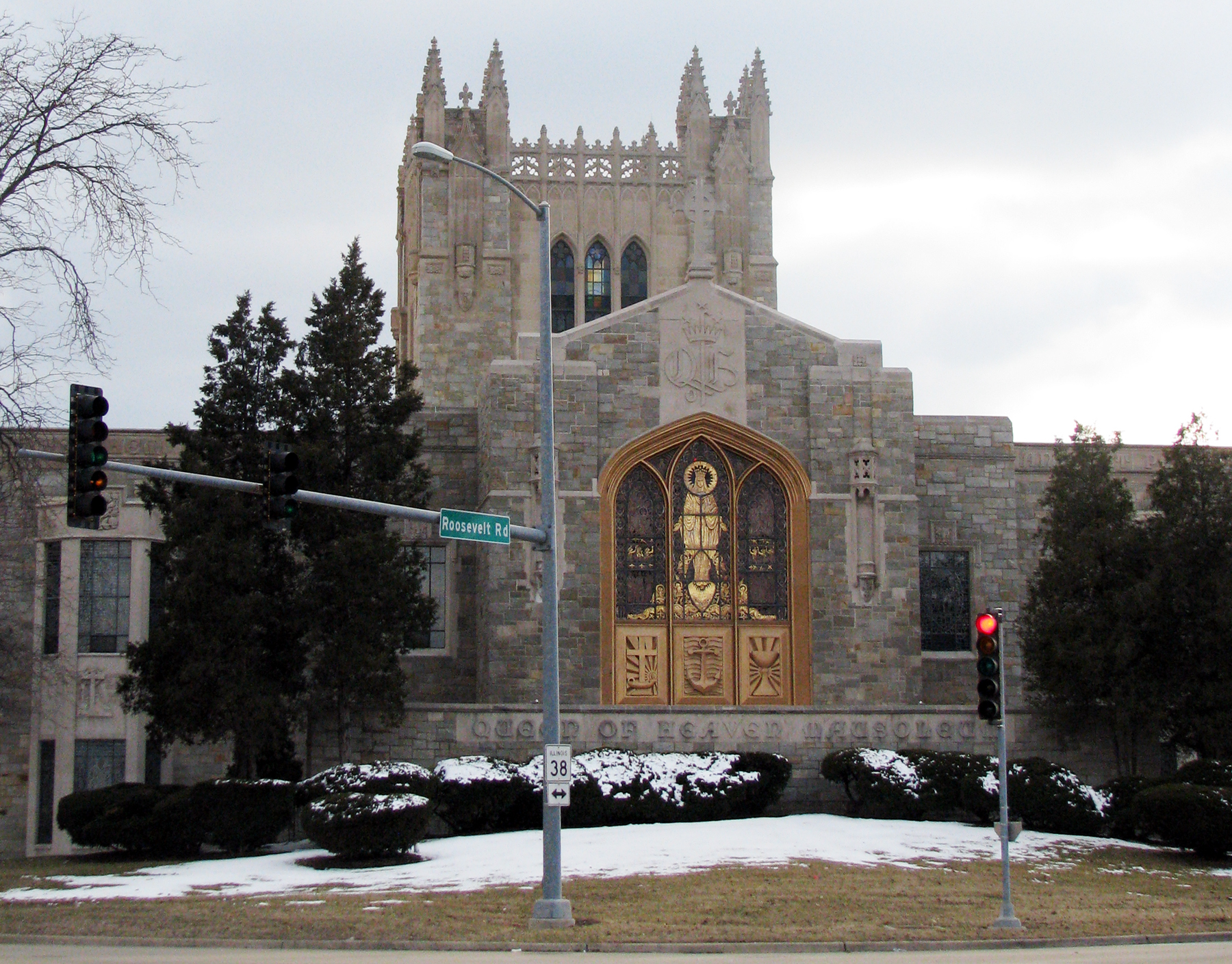
- Queen of Heaven Mausoleum
- Interactive map of Queen of Heaven Cemetery

Details
- Established: 1947
- Location: Hillside, Illinois
- Country: United States
- Coordinates: 41°51′44″N 87°54′09″W
- Type: Public
- Style: Roman Catholic
- Owned by: Archdiocese of Chicago
- Size: 472 acres (191 ha)
- No. of interments: 202,000+
- Find a Grave: Queen of Heaven Cemetery

Queen of Heaven Cemetery is a Roman Catholic cemetery in Hillside, Illinois, a suburban community near Chicago. The cemetery is operated by the Archdiocese of Chicago.

Queen of Heaven is located at Wolf and Roosevelt Roads, near the Eisenhower Expressway (Interstate 290), and is adjacent to another Catholic cemetery, Mount Carmel Cemetery.

== History ==
Queen of Heaven was consecrated in 1947. The cemetery maintained its own office until 1965, when operations were combined with neighboring Mount Carmel Cemetery. Currently, the cemetery is 472 acres (1.91 km^{2}) in size, and there are currently over 122,451 people buried there. There are approximately 3,215 annual interments at Queen of Heaven.

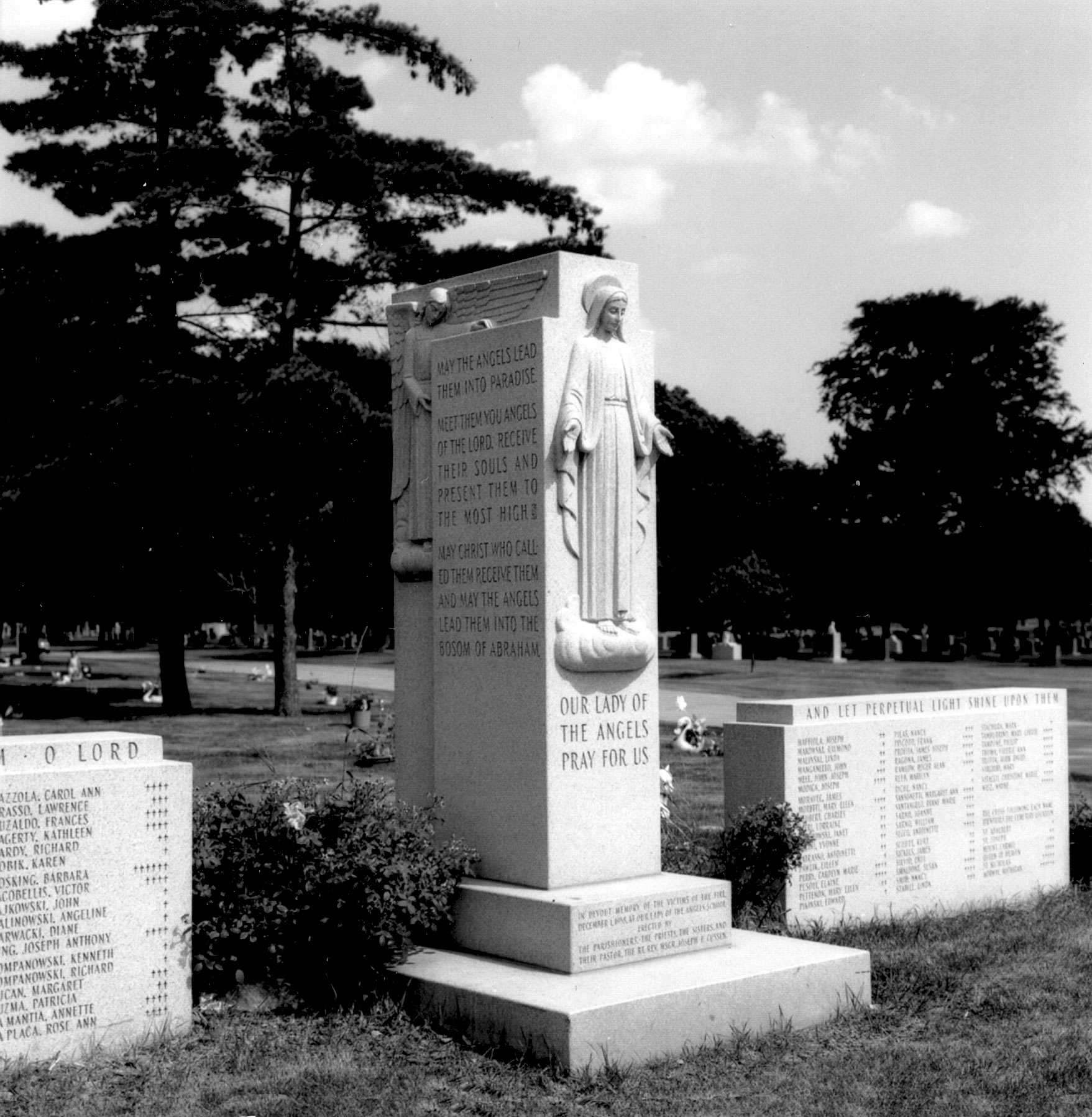
The Shrine of the Holy Innocents memorial at Queen of Heaven Cemetery

In addition to regular graves, Queen of Heaven was the first area cemetery to have religious shrine sections. One of these is the "Shrine of the Holy Innocents," where young victims of the 1958 Our Lady of the Angels School Fire are interred. In these sections families could purchase plots for all its members all at once, and not incur future charges.

Queen of Heaven Mausoleum, at the northeast corner of the cemetery, has 30,000 crypts and 64 columbarium niches. There is also a garden crypt complex, with 25,729 crypts and 720 columbarium niches.

The Queen of Heaven mausoleum complex has room for over 33,000 bodies and was as of 2009 about 75 percent filled. Present is huge gallery of stained glass, statuary and carved wood and statuary in marble, bronze and mosaic. The art in the west wing of the main building was carried out mostly by DaPrato Studios of Chicago, with an international array of artists/architectural designers,(including a few from the Chicago area) artists such as: Italo Botti, Angelo Gherardi (Italy/US), Urano Bottari (Italy/US), Laurence Campbell (Ireland), Professor Emeritus Peter Bagnolo (Oak Park, Illinois), and a number of others.

== Notable interments ==
- Frank Annunzio – U.S. Representative
- George Kirby – comedian and impressionist
- George Binks – baseball player
- Chet Bulger – football player
- Dick Drott – baseball player
- Nick Etten – baseball player
- Lawrence Jenco
- Celeste Lizio
- James Michels
- Thomas O'Brien – politician
- Francis S. Peabody, founder, and son Stuyvesant 'Jack' Peabody, executives of Peabody Coal Company, now Peabody Energy
- Angelo Poffo – professional wrestler and wrestling promoter
- Johnny Rigney – baseball player
- Daniel J. Ronan – U. S. Representative
- Elmer Vasko – hockey player
- Bill Wightkin – football player
- Mark Venturini – Actor, Friday the 13th, Part 5, Return of the Living Dead
- Michele Pane – Poet, Journalist, born in Adami Decollatura nephew of Francesco Fiorentino philosopher born of Sambiase, Lamezia Terme Calabria

=== Organized crime figures ===
- Tony Accardo – Chicago mobster
- Joseph Aiuppa – Chicago mobster
- Sam Battaglia – Associate of Al Capone
- Paul Ricca – Chicago mobster
- Sam DeStefano – Chicago mobster
- Anthony Spilotro – Chicago mobster
- Michael Spilotro – Chicago mobster
