= Murray Humphreys =

Chicago mobster (1899–1965)

- Murray Humphreys and wife Jeanne
- Born: Llewellyn Morris Humphreys; April 20, 1899; Chicago, Illinois, U.S.
- Died: November 23, 1965 (aged 66); Chicago, Illinois, U.S.
- Other names: "The Camel"; "The Hump"
- Occupation: Mobster
- Children: Llewella (b. 1934)
- Allegiance: Chicago Outfit
- Criminal charge: Perjury
- Penalty: Died before trial

Murray Humphreys (born Llewellyn Morris Humphreys; April 20, 1899 – November 23, 1965), also known as The Camel or The Hump, was an American mobster of Welsh descent associated with the Chicago Outfit. Humphreys was a leading fixer for the Chicago mafia and one of the most important Chicagoan gangsters in the post-Prohibition era. As a prominent labor racketeer he led the efforts of the Outfit to infiltrate organized labor in Chicago.

== Early life ==
Llewellyn Morris Humphreys was born in the United States, the third of five children. His parents, Bryan Humphreys and Ann Wigley, were from Carno, a small village near Newtown in Powys, Wales. They had married at the Methodist chapel in Llanidloes, Powys. However, as the long depression at the end of the 19th century caused great hardship in many Welsh farming communities, the young couple found it difficult to make a living from their isolated hilltop farm in Carno. The family eventually emigrated to the United States from the village of Llandinam.

The family's fortunes did not improve following arrival in the United States. Humphreys had to drop out of elementary school, aged seven, to get a job selling newspapers because of their impoverished condition. However, young "Curly" Humphreys (so nicknamed because of his dark curly hair) soon tried his hand at petty theft and became involved with the world of Chicago street gangs. By the time he had turned 13 years old, Humphreys was in the custody of a Chicago judge by the name of Jack Murray, who apparently attempted to interest the young hoodlum in a law career. While not inspiring Curly to follow in his footsteps, Judge Murray's judicial lessons proved of great value to Humphreys later on. It was at this time that Llewelyn Humphreys changed his name to Murray Humphreys.

During the next few years, Humphreys appears to have been involved in several jewel thefts and burglaries and by age 16, he was serving a 60-day sentence for petty larceny in Chicago's Bridewell Jail. The original charge had been one of felony burglary (which would have carried a much stiffer sentence) but Humphreys had convinced the prosecutor to change the charge. According to a later acquaintance of Humphreys, the young criminal's private ultimatum to the prosecutor went something like this: "You try to get me indicted for burglary and I will weep in front of the grand jury. They probably won't indict me because I am only 16 years old. But even if you get me to court, the do-gooders will say that because of my extreme youth I ought not to be sent to prison. However, if you reduce the charge to one of petty larceny, I will plead guilty. I will get a light sentence. You will get a conviction that looks good on your record. Everybody will be happy. What's more, you will receive a suitable gift before the case goes to court".

Humphreys then continued his life of crime, primarily one of jewel heists and burglaries. Murray left Chicago for his brother's home in Little Axe, near Pink, Oklahoma in 1921 after some difficulties. Taking a temporary job as a door-to-door salesman, Humphreys met an attractive young college student from Norman, named Mary Brendle. Marriage followed a brief courtship, and after a suitable time had elapsed, Humphreys took his young bride back with him to Chicago. Briefly going legitimate, Humphreys got a job as a short-order cook at a restaurant on Halsted Street, though Murray's "legitimacy" would be short-lived after he met customer Fred Evans.

The college-educated Evans was a small-time Chicago gangster in search of a partner who could help him break into the lucrative field of bootleg liquor. Evans found his partner in Humphreys, and the problem of having no product of their own was solved by the decision to hijack others' bootleg. All went smoothly for several years until Murray hijacked some bootleg belonging to the Capone mob. When Humphreys was identified by the truck's driver as the hijacker who had stuck a gun in his face, some Capone men picked Humphreys up and brought him before Capone. Exactly what conversation passed between the two is unknown, but apparently Capone was impressed enough by the smooth-talking young hood to give him a job with the Outfit. As an appreciative Capone was later to say of his chance discovery: "Nobody hustles like the Hump."

== Mob career ==
He was skinny and dapper and handsome in a sinister sort of way, a representative of the new breed of racketeer, part thug and part businessman. And he enjoyed Capone's favor.

—Capone: The Man and the Era, by Laurence Bergreen

The 27-year-old Humphreys was put into the racketeering side of the business but also carried out some killings for the mob around this time. His two most commonly known nicknames were "The Camel" and "The Hump". It has been suggested that the nickname, "The Camel", derived from his preference for wearing camel hair coats; however, a more likely explanation is that "The Camel," evolved from his other nickname, "The Hump", derived from his surname. The names given to him by his friends, however, were more revealing: "Mr. Einstein", "The Brainy Hood" and "Mr. Moneybags".

From the late 1920s to the early 1930s, Humphreys, along with "Red" Barker, William "Three-Fingered Jack" White and William "Klondike" O'Donnell, was one of the mobsters who orchestrated the Outfit's takeover of a number of Chicago labor unions.

Humphreys enjoyed the favor of then boss Al Capone, who said of him "Anybody can use a gun, but 'The Hump' uses his head. He can shoot if he has to, but he likes to negotiate with cash when he can. I like that in a man." He named his dog "Snorky" in honour of Capone and was a frequent visitor during his imprisonment for tax evasion. Humphreys was among the small amount of mourners to attend Capone's funeral in 1947.

In 1930 a police raid interrupted a meeting between Humphreys, Frank Rio, Ralph Pierce, and Paul Ricca with Illinois state representatives Albert Prigano, Roland V. Libonati, and Saul Tannenbaum at the city attorney's office. Several firearms were found.

Humphreys muscled his way into the Midwest Garage Owners Association (MGOA). After its leader, David Albin, refused to step down he was shot in the foot. On 21 December 1931 the president of the Milk Wagon Drivers Union Robert Fitchie was kidnapped and ransomed for $50,000 on the orders of Humphreys. A few days later he invested $54,000 into his own company Meadowmoor Dairy, a company he had strongarmed his way into. In March 1932 he and Charles Fischetti were arrested for the murder of Dennis H. Zeigler, secretary of Local 569 of the Hoisting and Portable Engineers Union. They were later released.

In 1933, with Capone behind bars for income tax evasion, the chief investigator for the State Attorney's office described Murray Humphreys as "'public enemy No. 1' and 'the czar of business rackets in Chicago.'" Later that same year, Humphreys was indicted for income tax evasion himself. On the run for 18 months, he finally gave himself up near Whiting, Indiana and entered a plea of guilty. Sentenced by a federal judge to 18 months in Leavenworth Prison, Humphreys wound up serving only 13 months of his sentence.

It is likely that Humphreys had a hand in arranging the 1933 fake kidnapping of John "Jake the Barber" Factor, a British con artist wanted in England for stock swindling. Factor, a Capone friend, was facing extradition proceedings when the Outfit staged a fake disappearance and framed Capone rival Roger "Terrible" Touhy for allegedly kidnapping Factor. Touhy received a 99-year prison sentence but was released in 1959, only to be murdered several weeks later. Six months after Touhy's death, Humphreys supposedly bought several shares of an insurance company and eight months later redeemed the shares for $42,000. An Internal Revenue Service (IRS) investigation soon determined that these shares had been originally owned by John Factor. The IRS claimed that the $42,000 was a payment from Factor to Humphreys for the fake 1933 kidnapping; they forced Humphreys to declare the money as income and pay taxes.

Other career highlights for Humphreys include his discovering and exploiting the intricacies of the legal system's "double jeopardy" rule and the U.S. Constitution's Fifth Amendment for the Mob's benefit.

When Jake "Greasy Thumb" Guzik died in 1956, Humphreys became the Outfit's chief political fixer and financial manager or, in the words of one Mafia historian, their "strategist, councilor, and master schemer". Knowing that Guzik's body could not be found at the restaurant without compromising some of the Outfit's most valuable judicial resources, Humphreys had the body surreptitiously removed from the restaurant and taken home to Mrs. Guzik, who was curtly informed that her husband had officially died at home.

By the time the late fifties rolled around, it was pretty well understood that Murray Humphreys had dined with presidents and kings all over the world, from the Philippines to Iran. But his real claim to fame was the fact that he'd single-handedly put some of the nation's richest labor unions in Chicago's pocket - a move that was worth billions to the Outfit, particularly in the gambling industry. With a resume like that, you could understand why Sam Giancana made Murray Humphreys one of his top financial advisers. But it wasn't just his brains that attracted Mr. G.; Humphreys had class, too. He could fit into the country club set as well as politicians and executives. He was also about as cold-blooded as a guy could get, which was a real interesting combination for a guy in his position. It made him even more dangerous.

— Double Deal, by Michael Corbitt and Chuck Giancana.

Giancana and his much valued "adviser" had rather dissimilar styles, illustrated by the following: both men were constantly tailed by Federal agents, but when Giancana grew impatient of a car tailing him, he put his foot to the gas and brought about a race between him and his pursuers. Humphreys, however, one day when he had had enough of being followed, got out of his car, sent his driver home, went up to the car that was following him and said: "You've been following me all day. There's no need for two cars. I'll ride with you." (He did just that, and apparently even bought the officers lunch.)

Sam Giancana and Murray Humphreys both topped the FBI's Top Hoodlum list, "Top Hoodlum" being a program put into operation in 1957 for the purpose of combating organized crime and the Mafia in particular. When Chicago FBI agents under the leadership of William F. Roemer finally discovered that a second-floor tailor shop on North Michigan Avenue, in the heart of what is now "Magnificent Mile", was a frequent meeting place for such Outfit notables as Humphreys, Tony Accardo, Sam Giancana and Gus Alex, the FBI painstakingly installed a hidden microphone in the shop after hours. "One microphone was worth a thousand agents", said Roemer, fondly remembering the bug they christened, "Little Al." "Little Al" remained in place undetected for five years, and gave the FBI invaluable knowledge about the inner workings of the Mafia.

From listening to the bugged conversations, the agents developed a fondness for the Hump, who was often heard to say, "Good morning, gentlemen, and anyone listening. This is the 9 o'clock meeting of the Chicago underworld." Unlike Giancana, whose every other word was profane, Humphreys never swore. In addition to having "perhaps the most brilliant mob mind in Chicago," as William Brashler has put it, he was also a marvelous raconteur.

— J. Edgar Hoover: The Man and the Secrets, by Curt Gentry

== Family and private life ==
Murray Humphreys:

Go out of your way to make a friend instead of an enemy.

Humphreys' first wife Mary Clementine Brendle, known affectionately as "Clemi", was an Oklahoman with part Cherokee ancestry. Together they had one child. The family's Chicago home was on 7710 Bennett Avenue, (where a plaque hung over the fireplace reading, "Love thy crooked neighbor as you love thy crooked self"). In the yard, Humphreys built his daughter an intentionally crooked playhouse.

Their other home was in Norman, Oklahoma. Clemi's many relatives lived nearby and Humphreys soon endeared himself to his acquired nephews and nieces: "I was a small child, and he was always super nice to me," recalled Ray Brendle nearly 60 years later. "He made our Christmases. He would play Santa Claus and come down from the second floor dressed as Santa and carrying presents for all us kids. We were all dirt poor, and he was the only one who had money." Others in Norman were favorably impressed by Humphreys' habit of handing out silver dollars to strangers who appeared needy. Another nephew once recalled how, "every holiday, uncle Lew would go downtown, fill the station wagon with turkeys and other food, and give it to the underprivileged Indian children." This seemingly philanthropic side of Humphreys was also noted by FBI agents, who discovered that Humphreys "was the one gangster who looked after just-released convicts who needed jobs, and who made certain that the Outfit gave pensions to widows and disabled associates." An FBI agent trying to understand his growing regard for "The Camel", guessed that: "it is probably a common pitfall for lawmen to develop affection for those of their adversaries who have more of the good human qualities than their other targets."

In 1957, after a separation of three years from her husband, Mary Brendle Humphreys filed for divorce. The following year Humphreys married his mistress Jeanne Stacy, but soon re-established friendly relations with Clemi, frequently calling her by phone and making occasional visits to Oklahoma. In 1964, Humphreys took his ex-wife and their daughter on a two-month tour of Europe.

After his second marriage Humphreys bought a home in Florida under the alias of, "Mr. Lewis Hart", supposedly a retired Texas oilman. Having at this time developed the heart condition that eventually killed him, Humphreys seemed to have tried retiring himself from the mob, but was too valuable a man for the Outfit to lose and so his "retirement" never happened.

== Arrest and death ==
"I'm so tired," he'd say. "I want out so bad, but I made my decision and I have to live with it."

— Llewella Humphreys

In 1965, Chicago boss Sam Giancana was jailed by Federal Judge William J. Campbell for his refusal to answer questions regarding the syndicate's activities. Campbell had blocked Giancana's plan to "Plead the Fifth" by announcing at the start of the hearing that Giancana would be granted automatic immunity for anything self-incriminating the gang boss might reveal in his testimony. When Giancana refused to say anything, he was charged with "Contempt of Court" and sentenced to be jailed "for the duration of the grand jury or until he chooses to answer." Three weeks after Giancana's arrest Humphreys was issued a subpoena to appear before the same grand jury. When Federal Bureau of Investigation (FBI) Agent William Roemer came to Humphreys' Marina Towers apartment to deliver the subpoena he was met at the door by Ernest Humphreys, who told Roemer that his brother had just left for parts unknown. When leaving the apartment, Roemer noticed a distinctly colored blue blazer hung on a chair.

Knowing that because of increasing blindness in one eye Humphreys always visited his family in Oklahoma by train, Roemer promptly checked the Santa Fe Railroad at Dearborn Station and called ahead for agents to stop the Oklahoma bound train. Humphreys was met by federal agents in Norman, who escorted him back to Chicago. At this time Roemer began to assemble proof that Humphreys had been intentionally fleeing the subpoena. The railroad employee who had sold Humphreys his ticket remembered what Humphreys had been wearing and described the same blue blazer that Roemer had seen while speaking to Ernest Humphreys. Also, a porter recalled how, while on the train, Humphreys was reading a newspaper, which he eventually threw aside. Picking up the paper, the porter had been surprised to see the reader's face displayed on page one, accompanied by an article about his being sought by the grand jury for questioning. Humphreys' subsequent testimony to the grand jury that he had not known about the subpoena when he left the state was thereby disproved, and three agents were sent to arrest Humphreys on the charge of perjury.

Roemer, who had developed a liking for Humphreys in the course of his dealings with him, purposely did not include himself among the agents he sent to arrest the mobster. When the three selected agents knocked on the door of Humphreys' apartment it was opened by Humphreys, with a 38-caliber revolver in his hand. One of the agents is quoted as saying: "Murray, for Christ's sake, you know we're FBI agents, put down the gun". The agents overpowered the aging, 66 years old, mobster without much difficulty and handcuffed him. There was a safe in the apartment, and the agents decided to make a "search" "incident to the arrest", which was outside Humphreys' knowledge of law. They asked Humphreys to hand over the key, which Humphreys refused to do. Another struggle ensued, which ended in the agents forcibly taking the key from Humphreys' pants pocket and opening the safe. Its contents and Humphreys were taken downtown where Humphreys' restaurateur friend, Morrie Norman, posted bail for him.

That night, at approximately 8:30 p.m., Ernest Humphreys found his dead brother lying fully clothed and face down on the floor of the same room where he and the agents had fought. Humphreys had apparently been vacuuming the room at the time of his death. The Cook County Coroner Andrew Toman attributed cause of death to an acute coronary occlusion.

Humphreys' Oklahoma family took a plane to Chicago and attended a private service at the Donnellan Funeral Home, where Humphreys' remains were cremated despite the wish he had expressed for his body to be donated for medical research. After the service Morrie Norman, having been a mutual friend of both Roemer and Humphreys, arranged a meeting between the family and Bill Roemer at his restaurant. "I told them all how much I respected their husband, father, and grandfather," recalled Roemer, "and that I deeply regretted what had happened."

I had clearly developed an affinity for Hump – more so by far than for anyone else in the mob. The man had killed in the Capone days on the way up. He had committed my cardinal sin, corruption, many times over. But there was a style about the way he conducted himself. His word was his bond ... Without question, I preferred working against a despised adversary such as a Giancana rather than a respected adversary such as a Humphreys. Each was a challenge – the difference being that I enjoyed the fruit of my success so much more against Giancana than I did against 'The Camel' ... in Chicago there would be plenty more mobsters to choose as targets. But none like Hump.

Roemer: Man Against the Mob, by William F. Roemer Jr.

Sandy Smith, the Chicago Tribune's top crime journalist, reported Humphreys' death in an article entitled, "His Epitaph: No Gangster Was More Bold". Another newspaper man, Mike Royko, had the following quip to offer: "[Humphreys] died of unnatural causes – a heart attack".

== Quotes ==
- "When Courtney was state's attorney and all of us guys got indicted and Nitti was hollerin' like hell, we broke through and we got the assistant state's attorney and we got the witness and let me tell you I had the jury, too, just in case. That's the way we got to revert to these days."
- "If you ever have to cock a gun in a man's face, kill him. If you walk away without killing him after doing that, he'll kill you the next day".

== Miscellany ==
Chicago tradition has it that the political advice, "Vote early and vote often", originated with Humphreys.

Described by Sam Giancana as "the nicest guy in the mob."

Reportedly inspired the character of Tom Hagen in The Godfather books.

In 2010, NewsOk in Oklahoma City published a story about the couple who bought the Humphrey's retreat in Norman, Oklahoma. On the property is the mausoleum containing the remains of Humphreys and his daughter and first wife.

"Humphreys was a highly skilled talent scout. According to scholars of such matters, he was the crime syndicate's leading recruiter of young blood, if you'll pardon the expression". - Mike Royko

Through his mother, Ann Wigley, Humphreys was the third cousin of Welsh nationalist politician Dafydd Wigley.
