= Anthony Spilotro =

American mobster (1938–1986)

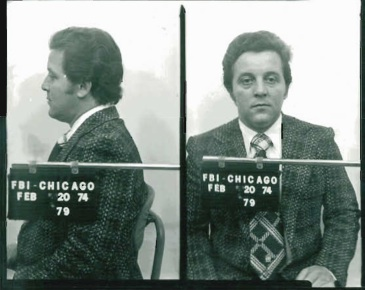
- A 1974 FBI mugshot of Spilotro
- Born: Anthony John Spilotro; May 19, 1938; Chicago, Illinois, U.S.
- Died: June 14, 1986 (aged 48); Bensenville, Illinois, U.S.
- Cause of death: Blunt force trauma
- Body discovered: June 22, 1986; Enos, Indiana, U.S.
- Resting place: Queen of Heaven Cemetery, Hillside, Illinois, U.S.
- Other name: "Tony the Ant"
- Spouse: Nancy Spilotro
- Relatives: Vincent, Victor, Pasquale, Michael and John (brothers)
- Allegiance: Chicago Outfit

Anthony John Spilotro (May 19, 1938 – June 14, 1986), nicknamed "Tony the Ant", was an American mobster and high-ranking member of the Chicago Outfit who operated in Las Vegas during the 1970s and '80s. Spilotro managed the Outfit's illegal casino profits (the "skim") when four of the casinos, the Stardust, the Fremont, the Hacienda and the Marina, were managed by Frank "Lefty" Rosenthal, replacing Outfit member John Roselli. He was also the leader of the "Hole in the Wall Gang", a burglary crew he formed when he moved to Las Vegas in 1971.

Spilotro eventually ran afoul of his superiors in Chicago over his handling of their Las Vegas concerns, and they arranged his murder on June 14, 1986. Spilotro's criminal career was detailed in Nicholas Pileggi's true crime book Casino and served as the basis for the character Nicky Santoro in Martin Scorsese's adaptation of that book by the same title in 1995.

== Early life ==
Anthony Spilotro was born on May 19, 1938, in Chicago, Illinois, the fourth of six children to Pasquale "Patsy" Spilotro Sr. and Antoinette Spilotro. He attended Burbank Elementary School in his childhood and entered Steinmetz High School in 1953. Spilotro's father had emigrated from Triggiano, Province of Bari, Italy, and had arrived at Ellis Island in 1914. Both parents ran Patsy's Restaurant, which was frequented by mobsters such as Sam Giancana, Jackie "The Lackey" Cerone, Gus Alex and Francesco "Frank the Enforcer" Nitti.

Spilotro and four of his brothers (John, Vincent, Victor and Michael) became involved in criminal activity starting at an early age; Victor would be inducted into the Chicago Outfit in 1987, one year after the deaths of Anthony and Michael. The remaining brother, "Patrick" Pasquale Jr., became a dentist. Spilotro started his criminal career alongside his boyhood friend Frank Cullotta, engaging in theft, burglary, and murder.

Spilotro was nicknamed "Tony the Ant" by the media after FBI Special Agent William Roemer publicly referred to him as "that little pissant." Since the media could not use "pissant", they changed it to "the Ant". For a short while around 1962 or 1963, Spilotro worked for Irwin Weiner's bail bonds company. Later he became a mob enforcer working under Charles Nicoletti.

== The Hole in the Wall Gang ==
In 1971, Spilotro moved to Las Vegas to help oversee the local concerns of the Chicago Outfit, which controlled four casinos on the Las Vegas Strip: the Stardust, the Fremont, the Hacienda and the Marina. Bored with his new assignment, Spilotro formed a burglary crew later dubbed the "Hole in the Wall Gang." The crew got its name from its penchant for drilling through the exterior walls and ceilings of the locations they burgled. In early 1979, Cullotta moved to Las Vegas to join Spilotro.

On July 4, 1981, the Hole in the Wall Gang robbed Bertha's Gifts & Home Furnishings on East Sahara Avenue. The robbery was a bust as much of the gang was arrested, including Cullotta, Joe Blasko, Leo Guardino, Ernest Davino, Lawrence Neumann and Wayne Matecki—each charged with burglary, conspiracy to commit burglary, attempted grand larceny and possession of burglary tools. Around this time, Spilotro had an affair with Geri McGee, the wife of Frank "Lefty" Rosenthal, whose casinos Spilotro had been sent to oversee.

In 1982, Cullotta was imprisoned and approached by the FBI with a wiretap of Spilotro talking with someone about "having to clean our dirty laundry", which Cullotta took as an insinuated contract on his life. Due to this, in July 1982, Cullotta finalized an agreement with the prosecutors. In September 1983, Spilotro was indicted for conspiracy and obstruction of justice in the Sherwin "Jerry" Lisner murder and released on $100,000 bail.

At a trial in October 1983, Cullotta admitted that he was involved in over 300 crimes, including four murders, perjury, robberies, and burglaries. He also testified that Spilotro, his boss in Las Vegas, ordered him to make a telephone call that lured one of the 1962 murder victims, William McCarthy, to a fast-food restaurant. McCarthy and James Miraglia were found dead in the trunk of a car on May 14, 1962. McCarthy's head had been placed in a vise and his throat slashed, while Miraglia was strangled. Spilotro was acquitted later that year. Spilotro's defense attorney was future Las Vegas mayor Oscar Goodman.

== Death and aftermath ==
Spilotro and his brother Michael disappeared on June 14, 1986, after they drove away together from Michael's Oak Park home. Michael's wife, Anne, reported both brothers missing on June 16. Michael's car, a 1986 Lincoln, was recovered several days later in a motel parking lot near O'Hare International Airport. On June 22, their bodies were found, one on top of the other and stripped down to their undershorts, buried in a cornfield in the Willow Slough preserve near Enos, Indiana. The freshly turned earth had been noticed by a farmer who thought that the remains of a deer killed out of season had been buried there by a poacher and notified authorities.

An autopsy completed on June 24 identified their cause of death as blunt force trauma, and ascertained that they had been dead since June 14. They were identified by dental charts supplied by their dentist brother, Patrick Spilotro. The two were buried in a family plot at Queen of Heaven Cemetery in Hillside, Illinois, on June 27.

The Spilotro brothers' fate had been sealed in January 1986. In the wake of the imprisonment of Joseph Aiuppa and John Cerone for skimming Las Vegas casino profits, most of the upper echelon of the Outfit attended a meeting that month at the Czech Lodge in North Riverside, Illinois. At the meeting, Outfit boss Tony "Joe Batters" Accardo appointed Samuel Carlisi as the "Street Boss" in charge of Outfit operations to replace Aiuppa. Carlisi told the group that Accardo would stay on as consigliere and would have the final say, as well as Gus Alex staying head of the connection guys. He then went on to the first problem: Spilotro, and how things had gone down since he took over Vegas. Mobster and mob enforcer Rocco Infelice said, "Hit him." Everyone else at the meeting agreed.

After his murder, Spilotro was replaced in Las Vegas by Donald "The Wizard of Odds" Angelini.

Although the original reports stated the Spilotros were beaten and buried in the Enos, Indiana cornfield, mobster Nicholas Calabrese testified in the Operation Family Secrets investigation in 2007 that the brothers were killed in a Bensenville, Illinois, basement, where the Spilotros had been led to believe Michael would be inducted into The Outfit. Then their bodies were transported to the cornfield and buried. According to court testimony, Tony realized in the Bensenville basement what was about to happen to him, and asked, "Can I say a prayer?"

No arrests were made until April 25, 2005, when 14 members of the Chicago Outfit (including reputed boss James Marcello) were indicted for 18 murders, including the Spilotros'. The suspected murderers included capo Albert Tocco from Chicago Heights, Illinois, who was sentenced to 200 years in prison in 1990, after his wife testified that, in 1986, she drove her husband from an Indiana cornfield where he told her he had just buried Spilotro.

On May 18, 2007, the star witness in the government's case against the 14 Chicago mob figures, Nicholas Calabrese, pleaded guilty to taking part in a conspiracy that included 18 murders. Under heavy security, Calabrese admitted that he took part in planning or carrying out 14 of the murders including the Spilotro killings. He became the key witness against his brother, Frank Calabrese Sr., and other major mob figures charged in the government's Family Secrets Trial. Calabrese agreed to testify after the FBI showed him DNA evidence linking him to the murder of fellow hitman John Fecarotta who was also allegedly involved in the Spilotro slayings.

In September 2007 Frank Calabrese Sr. and four other men—Marcello, Joseph Lombardo, Paul "The Indian" Schiro, and former Chicago police officer Anthony "Twan" Doyle—were convicted of mob-related crimes. On September 27, 2007, Marcello was found guilty by a federal jury in the murders of both Spilotro brothers. On February 5, 2009, Marcello was sentenced to life imprisonment for the Spilotro murders, and United States District Judge James Zagel, agreeing with the presentation made by federal prosecutor Markus Funk, also found Marcello responsible for the murder of Chicago Outfit mob associate Nicholas D'Andrea as well even though the jury had deadlocked on that count. On March 26, 2009, Nicholas Calabrese was sentenced to 12 years and four months imprisonment.

In a 2010 interview with Maxim magazine, while promoting the opening of the Las Vegas Mob Experience at the Tropicana Hotel, Tony Spilotro's son Vincent claimed that the real target of those who killed the Spilotro brothers was Michael Spilotro, and that Tony was killed to prevent any revenge.

== Suspect in gangland slayings ==
By the time of his death in 1986, the FBI suspected Spilotro was involved in 22 or 25 murders, including those of:

- Sam DeStefano on April 14, 1973.
- former Chicago Outfit boss Sam Giancana on June 19, 1975.
- William McCarthy and James Miraglia.
- William "Action" Jackson.

== In popular culture ==
In the 1980s NBC series Crime Story, the character of mobster Ray Luca is based on Anthony Spilotro. Show creator Michael Mann said in a 2015 interview "The people who Crime Story is about are all people I knew. I went to high school with Tony Spilotro..."

Martin Scorsese's film Casino (1995) is based on the Las Vegas careers of Spilotro and Rosenthal, on whom the characters Nicholas "Nicky" Santoro (played by Joe Pesci) and Sam "Ace" Rothstein (played by Robert De Niro) were based. Nearing the end of the film, Nicky and his brother Dominick (Philip Suriano), based on Tony's brother Michael Spilotro, are beaten with metal baseball bats (Nicky's forehead being visibly dented in the process) and then buried alive in an Indiana cornfield by their associate Frank Marino (Frank Vincent), based on Frank Cullotta, and the rest of Nicky's crew.

== See also ==
- List of homicides in Illinois § Organized crime
- List of solved missing person cases: 1950–1999
