= Frank Cullotta =

American mobster (1938–2020)

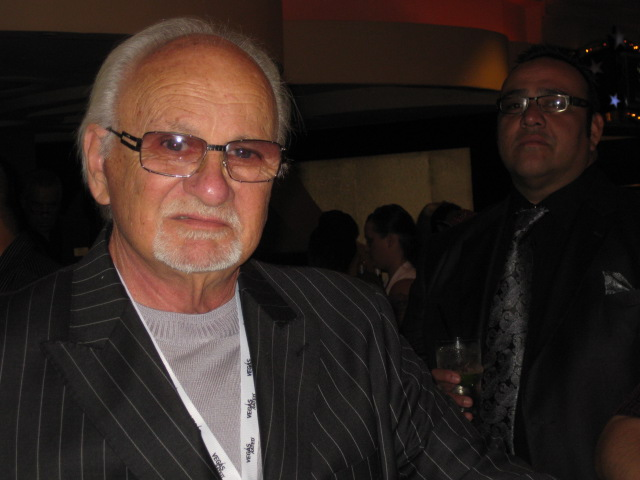
- Cullotta in 2012
- Born: Frank John Cullotta; December 14, 1938; Chicago, Illinois, U.S.
- Died: August 20, 2020 (aged 81); Las Vegas, Nevada, U.S.
- Other name: "Frank Seville"
- Occupations: Mobster; tour guide; writer
- Status: Deceased
- Allegiance: Chicago Outfit
- Conviction: Burglary (1968)
- Penalty: Eight years' imprisonment (1968); Eight years' imprisonment (1982)

Frank John Cullotta (December 14, 1938 – August 20, 2020) was an American mobster who was an associate of the Chicago Outfit through Tony Spilotro and a member of the Hole in the Wall Gang burglary ring in Las Vegas. After his arrest in 1982, he became a government witness and entered the witness protection program. Cullotta later became an author and a tour guide.

He died on August 20, 2020, from complications related to COVID-19.

== Early years ==
Cullotta was born on December 14, 1938, in Chicago, Illinois, to Josephine Montedore and Joseph Raymond Cullotta. Cullotta's father was also a criminal, although not connected with the Chicago Outfit. Cullotta dropped out of Steinmetz High School in the ninth grade, and started a criminal career together with boyhood friend Tony Spilotro, engaging in theft, burglary, and murder.

In 1962, Cullotta indirectly participated in the killings of William McCarthy and James Miraglia, who were both found dead in the trunk of a car on May 14, 1962. McCarthy's head had been placed in a vise and his throat slashed, while Miraglia was strangled.

In 1968, Cullotta was convicted of burglary and sentenced to eight years in prison. In 1972, he was paroled by the state, but was transferred to Federal Correctional Complex, Terre Haute to serve the federal portion of his sentence. After six months, he was transferred to a halfway house, ultimately being released in 1974.

== Hole in the Wall Gang ==
In early 1979, Cullotta moved to Las Vegas, Nevada to join Spilotro, who had already been there since 1971, with his group of experienced thieves, safecrackers, and killers. The burglary crew became known in the media as the "Hole in the Wall Gang" because of its penchant and skill for gaining entry to homes and buildings by drilling through the exterior walls and ceilings of the locations they burgled. In Las Vegas, Cullotta was nicknamed "Frank Seville" because he drove a Cadillac Seville.

On October 10, 1979, on Tony Spilotro's orders, Cullotta killed his former friend and grand jury witness Sherwin "Jerry" Lisner in Las Vegas. Lisner was suspected of informing to a grand jury the details on a money exchange scam he was working on with Cullotta. When he became a federal witness, Cullotta admitted he had killed Lisner, on orders from Tony Spilotro.

On July 4, 1981, the Hole in the Wall Gang attempted to burglarize Bertha's Gifts & Home Furnishings, a high-end store, on East Sahara Avenue in Las Vegas. The robbery was a bust, as the FBI and the Las Vegas Metro police had an inside informer named Sal Romano in the gang. Much of the gang was arrested in and around Bertha's, including Cullotta, ex-Metro officer Joe Blasko, Leo Guardino, Ernest Davino, Lawrence Neumann, and Wayne Matecki – each man was charged with burglary, conspiracy to commit burglary, attempted grand larceny, and possession of burglary tools.

In 1982, Frank Cullotta was imprisoned again, and was approached by the FBI with a wiretap of Spilotro talking with someone about "having to clean our dirty laundry", which Cullotta took as an insinuated contract on his life. Due to this, in July 1982, Cullotta finalized an agreement with the prosecutors.

In September 1983, Spilotro was indicted for conspiracy and obstruction of justice in the Lisner murder, and released on $100,000 bail. At a trial in October 1983, Cullotta admitted that he was involved in over 300 crimes, including four murders, perjury, robberies and burglaries. He also testified that Tony Spilotro, his boss in Las Vegas, ordered him to make a telephone call that lured one of the 1962 murder victims, William McCarthy, to a fast food restaurant. Spilotro was acquitted later that year.

Cullotta was given immunity for his previously uncharged crimes, but was sentenced to 10 years in prison, reduced to eight years after an outburst from Cullotta. He served two years at Metropolitan Correctional Center, San Diego, until he was paroled to the witness protection program in 1984, and placed on two years' probation. He spent two years under an assumed name in the program, moving around from time to time, including in Texas; Estes Park, Colorado; Biloxi and Gulfport, Mississippi; and Mobile, Alabama.

== Life after crime ==
Cullotta provided information for Nicholas Pileggi's 1995 book Casino: Love and Honor in Las Vegas, which Martin Scorsese adapted into the 1995 film Casino. Cullotta inspired the character Frank Marino (played by Frank Vincent), served as a technical advisor for the film, and also played an onscreen role as a hitman.

Cullotta co-authored two books with Dennis N. Griffin, Cullotta: The Life of a Chicago Criminal, Las Vegas Mobster, Government Witness (also with Dennis Arnoldy, 2007), and The Rise and Fall of a "Casino" Mobster: The Tony Spilotro Story Through a Hitman's Eyes (2017), and was involved in the making of several documentaries. Cullotta worked as a tour guide and a speaker for The Mob Museum in Las Vegas.

In January 2020, Cullotta started a YouTube channel called "Coffee with Cullotta".

== Death ==
On August 20, 2020, Cullotta died at the age of 81 in a Las Vegas hospital from complications related to COVID-19 and other medical issues, amid its pandemic in Nevada. His death was also announced on his YouTube channel, "Coffee with Cullotta".
