= Albert Tocco =

American mob boss

- Born: August 9, 1929; Chicago, Illinois, U.S.
- Died: September 21, 2005 (aged 76); Terre Haute, Indiana, U.S.
- Resting place: Evergreen Hill Memory Gardens, Steger, Illinois, U.S.
- Spouse: Betty Tocco
- Allegiance: Chicago Outfit
- Convictions: Racketeering, conspiracy, extortion, tax fraud (1990)
- Penalty: 200 years' imprisonment (1990)

Albert "Caesar" Tocco (August 9, 1929 – September 21, 2005) was an American mobster and high-ranking member of the Chicago Outfit during the 1970s and 1980s. He was the mob boss of Chicago Heights, the south suburbs, and parts of Northern Indiana. His brother, Joseph "Papa Joe" Tocco, helmed the Chicago Outfit's activities in Phoenix, Arizona, from the 1960s through to the 1980s.

Tocco was described as second-in-command to Alfred Pilotto, leader of the Chicago Heights Street Crew. He allegedly played a part in the murder of William Dauber and James "Jimmy The Bomber" Catuara. He would later run the street crew in his own right upon Pilotto's retirement. He, along with Albert "Nicky" Guzzino, Albert "Chicky" Roviaro and Dominick Palermo, is alleged to have botched the burial of Michael and Tony Spilotro. This resulted in him hiding abroad for a while before getting word that Joseph Ferriola had forgiven him. Tocco was captured in Greece after the FBI found him by orchestrating a visit for his eight-year-old son Michael, to see his father, and they followed him there.

On May 14, 1990, Tocco was sentenced to 200 years in prison for racketeering, conspiracy, extortion and tax fraud, after a trial in which his wife, Betty, testified against him. She testified that in 1986 she drove her husband from an Indiana cornfield where he told her he had just buried Anthony Spilotro. Betty is believed to be the first wife of an organized crime leader to testify against her husband, and she reportedly entered the federal witness protection program with their son Michael. With Tocco in prison, Dominick Palermo briefly took over the Chicago Heights operations before his 1991 conviction for extorting protection money. Tocco died of a stroke at the age of 76, on September 21, 2005, in prison in Terre Haute, Indiana.
