= Claude Maddox =

Chicago mobster

Claude "Screwy" Maddox (born John Edward Moore; 1901 – June 21, 1958) was a Chicago mobster and head of the Circus Cafe Gang whose ranks included future Chicago mobsters Anthony "Tough Tony" Capezio, Vincenzo De Mora ("Machine Gun" Jack McGurn, one-time owner of the "Green Mill") and Antonino "Tony" "Joe Batters" Accardo.

Maddox was born in St. Louis, Missouri. He served in the Army during World War I, reaching the rank of sergeant in the 18th Infantry Regiment. In 1920 he was a member of St. Louis based gang Egan’s Rats. which was absorbed by Alphonse "Big Al," "Scarface" Capone's gang, the Chicago Outfit. During Prohibition, the Circus Cafe Gang was the single North Side organization allied with Capone's Chicago Outfit. A suspect in the St. Valentine's Day Massacre, Maddox was believed to be involved in at least the early planning stages of the attack. In January 1929, the police discovered Maddox hiding in a vacant building near his West North Avenue headquarters with a drum full of ammunition for Thompson submachine guns as well as a dozen overcoats strewn about the room (inside one of the coats, a loaded .45 pistol was found). It was speculated that a nearby garage (at 1723 North Wood St.) was used to "torch cut" one of the getaway cars used in the massacre, however it later caught fire and exploded. Although initially held in custody, Maddox was later released, having been in court on an unrelated charge during the time of the massacre.

Although the gang was reduced to a satellite by the end of Prohibition, Maddox himself held a high position in the Chicago syndicate until his death in 1958, in his Riverside home, from a heart attack. His funeral was attended by high ranking members of the Outfit and surveilled by the FBI, who brought along the journalist Sandy Smith to identify the attendees.
