= Philip Suriano =

American actor

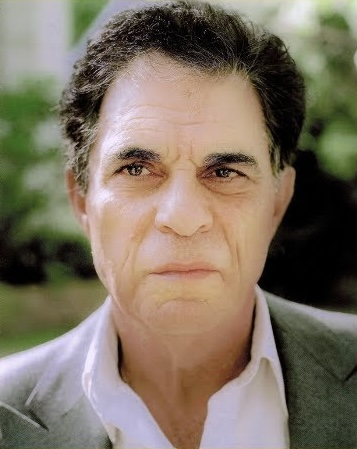
- Born: 1948 (age 77–78)
- Occupation: Actor
- Years active: 1987–present

Philip Suriano (born 1948) is an American actor known for his numerous small collaborations with acclaimed actors Robert De Niro and Joe Pesci. He is best known for playing the doomed Dominick Santoro in Martin Scorsese's 1995 film Casino, the younger brother of Pesci's Nicky Santoro, based on real-life mobster Michael Spilotro. Another small but notable appearance by Suriano was in 1989's Lethal Weapon 2 (also with Pesci), where his character makes and loses a bet with Mel Gibson's Martin Riggs but pays him with an illegal krugerrand.

Besides Casino and Lethal Weapon 2, Suriano has had small roles in other films, such as Goodfellas (again with De Niro and Pesci), Jane Austen's Mafia!, Ocean's Eleven and The Irishman (again with De Niro and Pesci).

== Filmography ==
Year	Title	Role	Notes
1970	The Out-of-Towners (1970 film)	Liquor Store Looter	Uncredited
1970	The Cross and the Switchblade (film)	Chi-Chi	Uncredited
1970	Move		
1970	The People Next Door (1970 film)	Motorcycle Gang Member	Uncredited
1975	The Last Day	Townsman	
1989	Lethal Weapon 2	Joseph Ragucci	
1990	American Born	Frankie Fingers	
1990	Goodfellas	Cicero's 60's crew #2	
1995	Casino	Dominick Santoro	
1997	8 Heads in a Duffel Bag	Gangster	
1998	Visions	Detective Novak	
1998	Mafia!	Frankie Totino	
2019	The Irishman	Silver Shop Owner	
