= Gus Alex =

American mobster

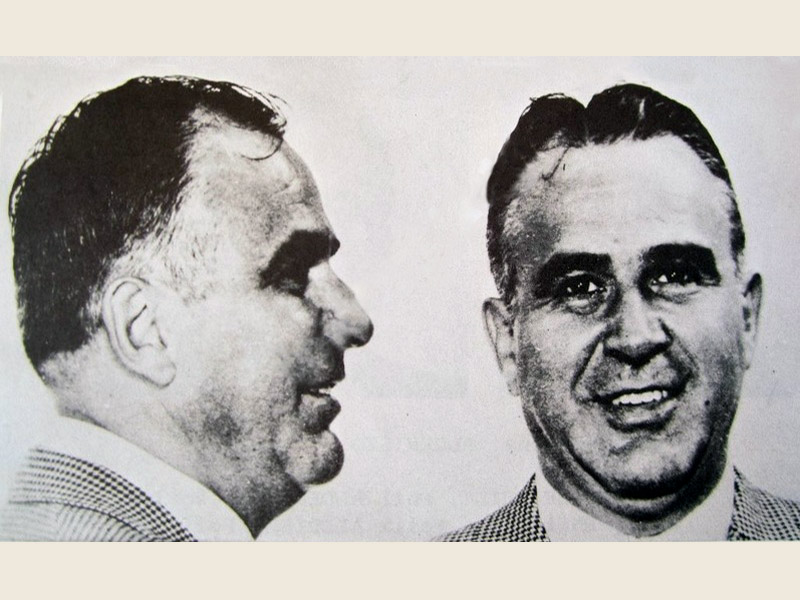
- Mugshot of Alex
- Born: April 1, 1916; Chicago, Illinois, U.S.
- Died: July 24, 1998 (aged 82); Lexington, Kentucky, U.S.
- Occupation: Mobster
- Allegiance: Chicago Outfit
- Conviction: Extortion
- Penalty: Fifteen years and eight months' imprisonment, $823,000 fine (1993)

Gus Alex (April 1, 1916 – July 24, 1998) was an American mobster affiliated with the Chicago Outfit, who succeeded Jake Guzik and Murray Humphreys as the Outfit's main political briber and "fixer".

== Early life ==
Alex's family came from the village of Alepochori in Achaea, Kingdom of Greece. According to William F. Roemer,

Gus, being Greek, could not be "made", but he had done it all. His dad had operated a small restaurant at Wentworth and 26th in Armour Square/Chinatown, which was frequented by many members of the Capone, and then the Nitti mob. Gus and Strongy [Ferraro] had worked in the restaurant from an early age. Both were sharp guys and came to the attention of the boys. Gus had, therefore, been one of them almost since birth.

Gus's older brother, Sam Alex, was also associated with the Outfit, reportedly controlling the Chicago local of the Hoisting Engineers, and engaged in other racketeering activities before his suicide in 1987.

Working primarily for Al Capone's Jewish-American associate, Jake Guzik, Alex would later become his protégé as he rose through the ranks of the Chicago crime family. By 1930, he was a suspect in at least five unsolved murder cases. Two of the alleged victims, later dying of their injuries in hospital, identified Alex as their assailant; three others were killed after reporting to the police that they had received extortion and death threats from Alex.

== From Guzik's protégé to Syndicate fixer ==
Under Guzik's guidance, Alex became experienced in securing Syndicate protection through bribery of city officials. By the mid-1940s, Alex was the main liaison between the Chicago Outfit and city hall officials. He exercised control over the Loop's illegal gambling and prostitution operations, including a lucrative call girl operation out of prominent downtown hotels in which many call girls were paid up to $500 to $1,000. Alex's operations brought in an estimated $1 million a month for the Syndicate.

Described as "one of the wiliest and slickest crooks" within the Chicago Outfit, Alex would invoke the Fifth Amendment over 39 times during his appearance before the Permanent Subcommittee on Investigations of the U.S. Senate Committee on Government Operations in refusing to answer questions about his activities.

During the 1960s, Alex came under suspicion during his annual ski trips to Switzerland, as the US government accused Alex of depositing Outfit money in unnumbered Swiss bank accounts. Although Alex's lawyers presented letters from Illinois Senator Everett Dirksen and Congressman William L. Dawson opposing government action, demanding that Alex be allowed to continue his "sporting trips", Swiss officials banned Alex from entering Switzerland for 10 years.

== Later years ==
Remaining a high-ranking member of the Chicago Outfit for over 30 years, Alex would retain his position throughout the reigns of Felice "Paul 'The Waiter' Ricca" DeLucia, Antonino "Tony," "Joe Batters" Accardo, and Salvatore "Sam," "Mooney" Giancana. Alex would continue to consolidate his political influence during the 1970s and 1980s not only within Chicago but expanding into the state capital Springfield, Illinois. Alex's political connections would ensure his position with the organization during the unstable leadership of the decade.

During Outfit leader Joseph "Joey Doves" Aiuppa's imprisonment, Alex would share responsibility for overseeing day-to-day activities with underboss Samuel "Wings" Carlisi. Both of them were in turn supervised by former leader Accardo, based in Palm Springs, California.

Alex was convicted for the first time at the age of seventy-six when a federal jury found him guilty of approving violent extortions of successful businessmen on October 1, 1992, after Leonard "Lenny" Patrick, a close Outfit associate, wore a "wire" and taped Alex for the FBI. Sentenced to fifteen years and eight months' imprisonment and a $823,000 fine in February 1993, he died of a heart attack in federal prison at Lexington, Kentucky, aged eighty-two on July 24, 1998.

== Quote ==
- On Las Vegas casinos:

It's a sucker's game. You can't win out there, you understand. We got the percentages rigged all in our favor. The longer you stay, the more you play, the more chances you got of losing. I don't let nobody around me who gambles. A couple thousand, okay, but no gambling!
