= Casino (1995 film) =

1995 epic gangster film directed by Martin Scorsese

- Theatrical release poster
- Directed by: Martin Scorsese
- Screenplay by: Nicholas Pileggi; Martin Scorsese
- Based on: Casino: Love and Honor in Las Vegas by Nicholas Pileggi
- Produced by: Barbara De Fina
- Starring: Robert De Niro; Sharon Stone; Joe Pesci; Don Rickles; Kevin Pollak; James Woods
- Cinematography: Robert Richardson
- Edited by: Thelma Schoonmaker
- Production companies: Universal Pictures; Syalis D.A.; Légende Entreprises; De Fina/Cappa
- Distributed by: Universal Pictures
- Release dates: November 14, 1995 (New York premiere); November 22, 1995 (United States); March 13, 1996 (France)
- Running time: 178 minutes
- Countries: United States; France
- Language: English
- Budget: $40–50 million
- Box office: $116.1 million

Casino is a 1995 crime film directed by Martin Scorsese and adapted by Scorsese and Nicholas Pileggi from the latter's nonfiction book Casino: Love and Honor in Las Vegas. It stars Robert De Niro, Sharon Stone, Joe Pesci, Don Rickles, Kevin Pollak, Frank Vincent, and James Woods. The film was the eighth collaboration between director Scorsese and De Niro.

Casino follows Sam "Ace" Rothstein (De Niro), a gambling expert handicapper who is asked by the Chicago Outfit to oversee the day-to-day casino and hotel operations at the Tangiers Casino in Las Vegas. Other significant characters include Nicky Santoro (Pesci), a made man and childhood friend of Ace, and Ginger McKenna (Stone), a streetwise chip hustler whom Ace marries, and with whom he has a daughter. The film details Ace's operation of the casino, the difficulties he confronts in his job, the Mafia's involvement with the casino, and the gradual breakdown of his relationships and standing, as Las Vegas changes over the years.

The primary characters are based on real people: Ace is inspired by the life of Frank Rosenthal, also known as "Lefty", who ran the Stardust, Fremont, Marina, and Hacienda casinos in Las Vegas for the Chicago Outfit from 1968 until 1981. Nicky and Ginger are based on mob enforcer Anthony Spilotro and former dancer and socialite Geri McGee, respectively. Casino was released on November 22, 1995, by Universal Pictures, to a mostly positive critical reception, and was a worldwide box office success. Stone's performance was singled out for acclaim, earning her a Golden Globe Award for Best Actress in a Motion Picture – Drama and a nomination for the Academy Award for Best Actress.

== Plot ==
In 1973, sports handicapper Sam "Ace" Rothstein is sent by the Chicago Mafia to Las Vegas to run the Tangiers Casino, with Philip Green serving as its frontman and Ace's childhood friend Nicky Santoro assigned to protect both him and the casino. Ace soon doubles the casino's profits, with a portion regularly skimmed and delivered to the Midwest Mafia bosses. After Nicky is blacklisted from working in Las Vegas casinos, he assembles a crew that includes his younger brother Dominick and right-hand man Frankie Marino to carry out extortion and jewellery burglaries for their own profit. Nicky's criminal activities soon attract unwanted media and police attention.

Ace falls in love with con artist and former prostitute Ginger McKenna. They marry and have a daughter, Amy, but their marriage is soon strained by Ginger's drug and alcohol addiction and her relationship with Lester Diamond, her former lover and pimp. Eventually, Ace arranges for Nicky and his crew to beat Lester after catching him accepting $25,000 from Ginger at a café.

In 1976, Ace fires slot manager Don Ward for incompetence. Ward is the brother-in-law of Clark County Commission chairman Pat Webb, who fails to persuade Ace to reinstate him. In retaliation, Webb has Ace's gaming license application denied, jeopardizing Ace's position. Ace responds by insulting the gaming board and local politicians during the licensing hearing, creating a spectacle for the news cameras and bringing more unwanted attention to the casino. Unable to legally run the casino, Ace begins hosting a local television talk show from the Tangiers, frustrating the Midwest bosses by drawing even more attention to their operation. Ace blames Nicky's reckless criminality for the growing scrutiny, leading to a confrontation in the desert that ends with Nicky threatening him. Ace's repeated attempts to persuade Nicky to leave Las Vegas further strain their friendship.

In 1980, with his marriage on the verge of collapse, Ace considers divorcing Ginger. She later kidnaps Amy and plans to flee to Europe with Lester. After learning of her plan, Ace convinces Ginger to return with their daughter. Later that night, Ace catches Ginger arranging a contract killing against him. He throws her out, but reluctantly forgives her when she returns. Ginger confides in Nicky and the two begin an affair, which private investigators soon expose. Nicky ends the affair after Ginger asks him to kill Ace and threatens to inform the FBI about their criminal activities. Ginger steals much of Ace's cash and jewelry, and prepares to abandon Ace and Amy, only to be arrested by the FBI shortly afterwards.

In 1982, the FBI discovers records kept by Artie, who oversees the skimming operation. The FBI closes the Tangiers and persuades Green to cooperate. Agents also approach Ace and show him photographs of Nicky and Ginger together, but he refuses to help. The Midwest bosses are arrested, and to protect themselves they arrange the murders of everyone involved in the casino operation who could testify against them. In 1983, an impoverished Ginger dies from a drug overdose in Los Angeles, which Ace suspects was tainted to be lethal. That same year, Ace narrowly survives a car bomb and suspects Nicky is responsible. In 1986, the Midwest bosses, having grown tired of Nicky's reckless criminality, have him and his brother beaten with baseball bats by Frankie and buried alive in a shallow grave in a remote Illinois cornfield.

In the years that follow, the Mafia is pushed out of the casino industry by large corporations, which demolish nearly all of the old casinos. They are replaced by newer, more glamorous casinos, that Ace laments are impersonal and soulless. Because he remains a reliable earner for the Mafia, Ace is spared, and he relocates to San Diego, where he resumes working as a sports handicapper.

== Cast ==
- Robert De Niro as Sam "Ace" Rothstein
- Sharon Stone as Ginger McKenna
- Joe Pesci as Nicky Santoro
- James Woods as Lester Diamond
- Don Rickles as Billy Sherbert
- Alan King as Andy Stone
- Kevin Pollak as Phillip Green
- L. Q. Jones as Pat Webb
- Dick Smothers as Senator Harrison Roberts
- Frank Vincent as Frank Marino
- John Bloom as Don Ward
- Pasquale Cajano as Remo Gaggi
- Melissa Prophet as Jennifer Santoro
- Bill Allison as John Nance
- Vinny Vella as Artie Piscano
- Oscar Goodman as himself, lawyer for Mafia members
- Catherine Scorsese as Piscano's Mother
- Philip Suriano as Dominick Santoro
- Erika Von Tagen as Older Amy
- Richard Riehle as Charlie Clark
- Frankie Avalon as himself
- Steve Allen as himself
- Jayne Meadows as herself
- Jerry Vale as himself
- Gene Ruffini as Vinny Forlano
- Joseph Rigano as Vincent Borelli
- Paul Herman as gambler in phone booth

== Production ==
=== Development ===
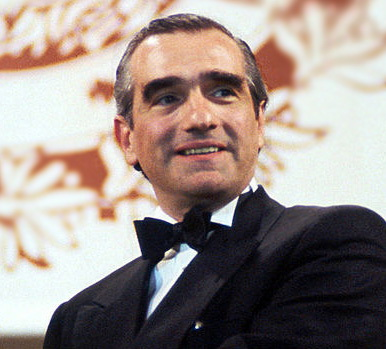
Martin Scorsese, the director of the film, receiving the Career Golden Lion at the 1995 Venice Film Festival

Casino is based on New York crime reporter Nicholas Pileggi's book Casino: Love and Honor in Las Vegas. The research for Casino began when Pileggi read a 1980 report from the Las Vegas Sun about a domestic argument between Frank "Lefty" Rosenthal, a casino figure, and his wife Geri McGee, a former topless dancer. This gave him an idea to focus on a new book about the true story of mob infringement in Las Vegas during the 1970s, when filming of Goodfellas (whose screenplay he co-wrote with Scorsese) was coming to an end. The fictional Tangiers resort reflected the story of the Stardust Resort and Casino, which had been bought by Argent Corporation in 1974 using loans from the Teamsters Central States Pension Fund. Argent was owned by Allen Glick, but the casino was believed to be controlled by various organized crime families from the Midwest. Over the next six years, Argent Corporation siphoned off between $7 and $15 million using rigged scales. This skimming operation, when uncovered by the FBI, was the largest ever exposed. A number of organized crime figures were convicted as a result of the skimming.

Nicholas Pileggi contacted Martin Scorsese about taking the lead of the project, which became known as Casino. Scorsese expressed interest, calling this an "idea of success, no limits." Pileggi was keen to release the book and then concentrate on a film adaptation, but Scorsese encouraged him to "reverse the order."

Scorsese and Pileggi collaborated on the script for five months, towards the end of 1994. Real-life characters were reshaped, such as Frank "Lefty" Rosenthal, Geri McGee, Anthony Spilotro, Spilotro's brother Michael, Spilotro's right-hand man Frank Cullotta, and mob boss Joseph Aiuppa. Some characters were combined, and parts of the story were set in Kansas City instead of Chicago. A problem emerged when they were forced to refer to Chicago as "back home" and use the words "adapted from a true story" instead of "based on a true story." Real life mobster turned witness Frank Cullotta inspired the character Frank Marino (played by Frank Vincent), served as a technical advisor for the film, and also played an on-screen role as a hitman. In interviews, Cullotta expressed his initial displeasure at his character Frank Marino participating in the murder of the Santoro brothers, but Scorsese persuaded him to accept it on the basis that Nicky could only be lured to his death by a trusted friend.

They also decided to simplify the script, so that the character of Sam "Ace" Rothstein worked only at the Tangiers Casino, in order to show a glimpse of the trials involved in operating a Mafia-run casino hotel without overwhelming the audience. According to Scorsese, the initial opening sequence was to feature the main character, Sam Rothstein, fighting with his estranged wife Ginger on the lawn of their house. The scene was too detailed, so they changed the sequence to show the explosion of Sam's car and him flying into the air before hovering over the flames in slow motion—like a soul about to go straight down to hell.

Costume designer Rita Ryack was chosen to design De Niro's suits. Despite common legend citing that the clothing budget exceeded $1 million, Ryack has since revealed it was much lower.

=== Principal photography ===
Filming happened at night in the Riviera casino in Las Vegas, with the nearby defunct Landmark Hotel as the entrance, to replicate the fictional Tangiers. According to Barbara De Fina, the film's producer, there was no reason to construct a set if they could simply film around an actual casino. The opening scene, with Sam's car exploding, was shot three times; the third take was used for the film. During the table arguing scene, De Niro called Stone a "good actress". Saul Bass designed the title sequence, which was his last work. The total cost for the titles was $11,316, not including the fees for the Basses. Bass justified the cost to De Fina by noting that creating a continuous explosion from a second shot of an explosion demanded a lot of experimentation, as did getting the flight path of the body exactly right. When first submitted to the MPAA, the film received an NC-17 rating due to its depictions of violence. Several edits were made in order to reduce the rating to R.

The film was shot in the common top Super 35 format as it allowed the picture to be reformatted for television broadcast. Scorsese said, "I wish I could just shoot straight anamorphic, but the lenses we had in this situation were actually much more diversified. To a certain extent, shooting a film this way can make certain technical aspects more difficult, but to me, anything is better than panning and scanning on TV. We can re-frame just about every shot we did on this picture for video." Cinematographer Robert Richardson, on the other hand, was not impressed with the quality of the release prints, and did not touch the format again until Kill Bill: Volume 1, at which point the digital intermediate process was available.

=== Soundtrack ===
Professional ratings
Review scores
| Source | Rating |
|---|---|
| AllMusic | 4.5/5 stars |

Disc 1

1. "Contempt – Theme De Camille" by Georges Delerue (2:32)
2. "Angelina/Zooma, Zooma Medley" by Louis Prima (4:16)
3. "Hoochie Coochie Man" by Muddy Waters (2:50)
4. "I'll Take You There" by The Staple Singers (4:29)
5. "Nights in White Satin" by The Moody Blues (4:27)
6. "How High the Moon" by Les Paul & Mary Ford (2:08)
7. "Hurt" by Timi Yuro (2:27)
8. "Ain't Got No Home" by Clarence 'Frogman' Henry (2:22)
9. "Without You" by Nilsson (3:20)
10. "Love Is the Drug" by Roxy Music (4:08)
11. "I'm Sorry" by Brenda Lee (2:38)
12. "Go Your Own Way" by Fleetwood Mac (3:36)
13. "The Thrill Is Gone" by B.B. King (5:26)
14. "Love Is Strange" by Mickey & Sylvia (2:54)
15. "The 'In' Crowd" by Ramsey Lewis (5:50)
16. "Stardust" by Hoagy Carmichael (3:47)

Disc 2

1. "Walk on the Wild Side" by Jimmy Smith (5:56)
2. "Fa-Fa-Fa-Fa-Fa (Sad Song)" by Otis Redding (2:42)
3. "I Ain't Superstitious" by Jeff Beck Group (4:53)
4. "The Glory of Love" by The Velvetones (2:51)
5. "(I Can't Get No) Satisfaction" by Devo (2:39)
6. "What a Diff'rence a Day Made" by Dinah Washington (2:29)
7. "Working in the Coal Mine" by Lee Dorsey (2:45)
8. "House of the Rising Sun" by Eric Burdon (4:38)
9. "Those Were the Days" by Cream (2:55)
10. "Who Can I Turn To?" by Tony Bennett (2:55)
11. "Slippin' and Slidin'" by Little Richard (2:42)
12. "You're Nobody till Somebody Loves You" by Dean Martin (2:13)
13. "Compared to What" (Live) by Les McCann & Eddie Harris (8:35)
14. "Basin Street Blues/When It's Sleepy Time Down South" by Louis Prima (4:12)
15. "St. Matthew Passion (Wir setzen uns mit Tränen nieder)" by Johann Sebastian Bach (Chicago Symphony Orchestra, conducted by Sir Georg Solti) (6:26)

== Reception ==
=== Box office ===
During a five-day Thanksgiving holiday weekend, Casino opened in fifth place at the box office, grossing $14.5 million. The film grossed $43 million domestically and $73 million internationally, for a total of $116 million worldwide, against a $40–50 million production budget.

=== Critical response ===
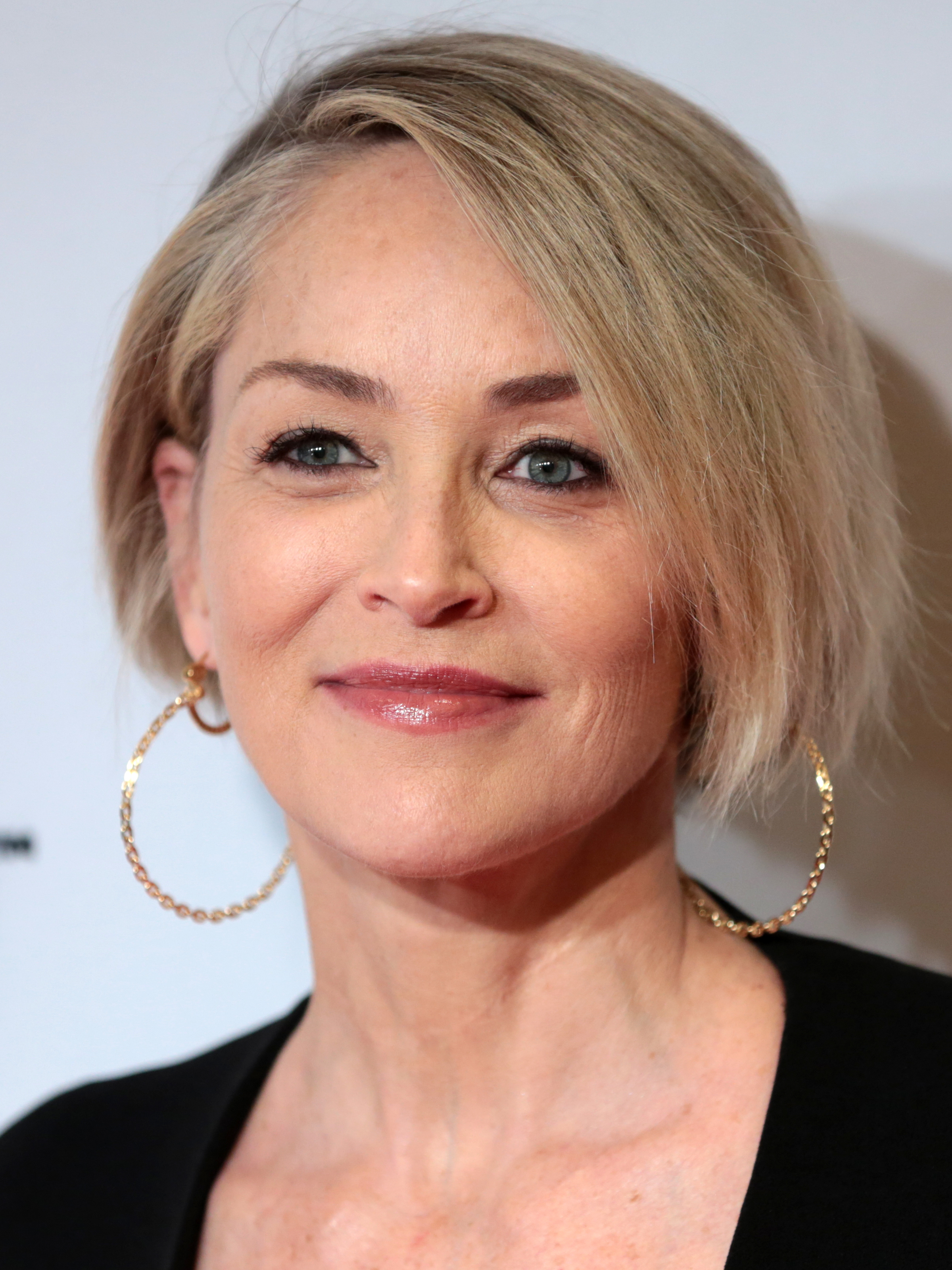
Sharon Stone's performance garnered critical acclaim, earning her the Golden Globe Award for Best Actress in a Motion Picture – Drama, in addition to a nomination for the Academy Award for Best Actress.

Upon its release, Casino received mostly positive reviews from critics, although their praise was more muted than it had been for the thematically similar Goodfellas, released only five years earlier, with some reviewers criticizing Scorsese for retreading familiar territory. The film was also criticized by some for its graphic violence. On review aggregator Rotten Tomatoes, the film has an approval rating of 79% based on 77 reviews, with an average rating of 7.5/10. The site's critical consensus reads, "Impressive ambition and bravura performances from an outstanding cast help Casino pay off in spite of a familiar narrative that may strike some viewers as a safe bet for director Martin Scorsese." On Metacritic, the film has a weighted average score of 73 out of 100, based on 17 critics, indicating "generally favorable" reviews. Audiences surveyed by CinemaScore gave the film a grade "B−" on scale of A+ to F.

Roger Ebert of the Chicago Sun-Times gave the film four stars, stating, "Martin Scorsese's fascinating new film Casino knows a lot about the Mafia's relationship with Las Vegas. Like The Godfather it makes us feel like eavesdroppers in a secret place." He added, "Unlike his other Mafia movies (Mean Streets and Goodfellas), Scorsese's Casino is as concerned with history as with plot and character." Janet Maslin of The New York Times noted that the film's journalistic approach resulted in "no conveniently sharp focus, a plot built like a centipede and characters with lives too messy to form conventional dramatic arcs." Nevertheless, she praised Sharon Stone, writing that she "will be nobody's idea of Hollywood fluff after this spectacular, emblematic performance."

Todd McCarthy of Variety felt the film "possesses a stylistic boldness and verisimilitude that is virtually matchless". He praised De Niro's performance as "outstanding" and felt Stone was "simply a revelation here". However, he noted Pesci "holds up his end of the picture perfectly well, but Nicky is basically the same character he won an Oscar for in Goodfellas, but with a shade less of an edge." Peter Travers of Rolling Stone wrote the film "is not the equal of Mean Streets or GoodFellas, the more instinctive pieces in the crime trilogy that the flawed Casino completes (Coppola's Godfather Part III fell off far more precipitously). It is, however, just as unmistakably the work of a virtuoso—bold, brutally funny and ferociously alive."

Kenneth Turan of the Los Angeles Times noted the film is a return to Scorsese's earlier gangster films, but felt he made "too few emotional connections to persuade us to see things the way he does. So instead of being operatic and cathartic, this film ends up exhausting and claustrophobic." He praised the principal actors, most particularly highlighting Stone for displaying "star quality and a feral intensity that is the equal of what the boys are putting down." Philip Thomas of Empire magazine praised the film while highlighting its similarities to Goodfellas. He gave the film five stars commenting "It may not be Scorsese's greatest work, but this guy feeling a little off-colour is still far, far better than most people on fighting-fit form. It only gets more impressive as time goes on."

Gene Siskel of the Chicago Tribune gave the film two and a half stars out of four, writing Casino is a "sometime-dazzling, often-disappointing film from the great Martin Scorsese, who too often seems like he's replaying his greatest hits with this picture, and not to the best effect ... DeNiro's relationship with Cathy Moriarty in Raging Bull was better and the flash-temper role by Pesci is a carbon copy of his work in Goodfellas. Casino is hardly a bad film, but it breaks no new ground for Scorsese." Desson Howe of The Washington Post wrote the film is "not great" and that clearly "Scorsese and Pileggi are trying to disinter the success of GoodFellas, their last collaboration. But they only come up with Raging B.S."

The film's critical profile has increased in the years after its release, with critics Tom Charity and Natasha Vargas-Cooper expressing that they retrospectively feel Casino is a more accomplished and artistically mature work than the thematically similar Goodfellas.

== Accolades ==
| Association | Category | Recipient | Result |
|---|---|---|---|
| 20/20 Awards | Best Film Editing | Thelma Schoonmaker | Won |
| Academy Awards | Best Actress | Sharon Stone | Nominated |
| American Cinema Editors Awards | Best Edited Feature Film | Thelma Schoonmaker | Nominated |
| Awards Circuit Community Awards | Best Cast Ensemble | | Nominated |
| Cahiers du Cinéma | Best Film | Martin Scorsese | 3rd Place |
| Chicago Film Critics Association Awards | Best Director | Martin Scorsese | Nominated |
| Chicago Film Critics Association Awards | Best Actress | Sharon Stone | Nominated |
| Dallas–Fort Worth Film Critics Association Awards | Best Actress | Sharon Stone | Nominated |
| Golden Globe Awards | Best Actress in a Motion Picture – Drama | Sharon Stone | Won |
| Golden Globe Awards | Best Director – Motion Picture | Martin Scorsese | Nominated |
| MTV Movie Awards | Best Female Performance | Sharon Stone | Nominated |
| MTV Movie Awards | Best Villain | Joe Pesci | Nominated |
| Nastro d'Argento | Best Foreign Director | Martin Scorsese | Nominated |
| Nastro d'Argento | Best Production Design | Dante Ferretti | Won |
| Nastro d'Argento | Best Male Dubbing | Gigi Proietti (for dubbing Robert De Niro in the Italian version) | Won |

== See also ==
- List of films set in Las Vegas
- List of films that most frequently use the word fuck

== Bibliography ==
- Thompson, David; Christie, Ian (1996). Scorsese on Scorsese. Faber and Faber. ISBN 978-0-571-22002-1.
- Baxter, John (2003). De Niro: A Biography. HarperCollins. ISBN 978-0-006-53230-9.
