= William F. Roemer Jr. =

American FBI special agent and attorney

William F. Roemer Jr. (June 16, 1926 – June 14, 1996) was an FBI agent for 30 years. He is known for his battle against organized crime with his partner, Special Agent Ralph R. Hill Jr., and being the most highly decorated agent in FBI history. After retirement he became a private attorney for businesses being muscled by the mob. He was the author of several books, including biographies on mobsters Tony "The Ant" Spilotro and Tony "Joe Batters" Accardo.

Throughout his career, he encountered and dealt with Felix "Milwaukee Phil" Alderisio, Gus Alex, Jackie "The Lackey" Cerone, Sam "Mooney" Giancana, Murray "The Camel" Humphreys, "Mad" Sam DeStefano, and Joseph Bonanno, Anthony Spilotro, among others. Roemer died in 1996 of lung cancer, two days before his 70th birthday.

== Early life ==
William F. Roemer Jr. was born in Indiana to William F. Roemer, a former Jesuit seminarian, and Carmel (Luther) Roemer.

During World War II, he served as a Private (1st Class) in the U.S. Marine Corps. He attended University of Notre Dame for a legal career. While there, he became an amateur boxer, and was nicknamed "Zip" for his skills.

== Career highlights ==
William F. Roemer Jr. then joined the FBI in 1950 and served there for 30 years before retiring in 1980.

When J. Edgar Hoover created the Bureau's "Top Hoodlum Program" in 1957, Roemer was personally selected for the task. The program consisted of surveillance of organized crime figures. Roemer developed (or tried to develop, "flip") several mob informants. Richard Cain, a disgraced former cop turned mafioso, was one of those. With his efforts, he helped the Feds put away Outfit bosses like Sam "Teets" Bataglia and Felix "Milwaukee Phil" Alderisio within a year of their rise to leadership. Roemer also tried over a period of time to "flip" Outfit "hitman" Charles "Chuckie" Nicoletti, to no avail. Roemer was indirectly related to the death of William "Action" Jackson who was the victim of a grisly gangland murder after Roemer was observed trying to make Jackson an informant and the Chicago Outfit suspected him of snitching.

== Retirement and later life ==
During retirement Roemer was an Arizona neighbor with New York City mobster Joe Bonanno. In the 1996 HBO movie Sugartime Roemer appears as a CIA agent who recruits Sam Giancana to assist the U.S. in killing Fidel Castro. That is artistic license because Roemer worked for the FBI, not the CIA, and that is not how the CIA recruited the Mafia. The movie Sugartime is based on Roemer's 1989 book, Man Against the Mob.

He was interviewed for the 1988 Jack Anderson documentary American Expose: Who Killed JFK?. On June 14, 1996, William F. Roemer Jr. died, aged 69, of natural causes at his home in Tucson, Arizona. He was cremated in Arizona. A plaque in his honor is located at the Cedar Grove Cemetery, St. Joseph County, Indiana.

== Bibliography ==
- Roemer, William F. Jr. (1989) Roemer: Man Against the Mob, New York : D.I. Fine, ISBN 1-55611-146-0
- Roemer, William F. Jr. (1990) War of the Godfathers: The Bloody Confrontation Between the Chicago and New York Families for the Control of Las Vegas, New York: D.I. Fine, ISBN 1-55611-193-2
- Roemer, William F. Jr. (1994) The Enforcer: Spilotro, The Chicago Mob’s Man Over Las Vegas, New York : D.I. Fine, ISBN 1-55611-399-4
- Roemer, William F. Jr. (1995) Accardo: The Genuine Godfather, New York : D.I. Fine, ISBN 1-55611-467-2
- Roemer, William F. Jr. (1994) Mob Power Plays: The Mob Attempts Control of Congress, Casinos, and Baseball ISBN 978-1561711680
