= Casino: Love and Honor in Las Vegas =

1995 non-fiction book

- Hardcover edition
- Author: Nicholas Pileggi
- Language: English
- Subject: True crime, biography, Mafia, criminals, case studies
- Genre: Biography, case studies
- Publisher: Simon & Schuster
- Publication date: October 1995
- Publication place: United States
- Media type: Print (hardcover & paperback), eBook, audio cassette, audio CD, Audible Audio Edition, Amazon Kindle
- Pages: 368 pp (hardcover)
- ISBN: 0684808323
- Dewey Decimal: 364.1/06/0973135
- LC Class: HV6248.R683 P55 1995

Casino: Love and Honor in Las Vegas (ISBN 0684808323) is a 1995 non-fiction book by crime reporter Nicholas Pileggi that details the relationship between Lefty Rosenthal, a Jewish associate of the Mafia, and mob enforcer Tony Spilotro, and their exploits working in Mafia-controlled casinos in 1970s Las Vegas. It was adapted by Martin Scorsese and Pileggi into the 1995 film Casino.

== Summary ==
Casino covers the period during the 1970s and early 1980s when the Chicago Outfit controlled certain Las Vegas casinos. Pileggi focuses on the story of Frank "Lefty" Rosenthal, a Chicago bookmaker working for the Chicago Outfit, and his friend and partner, made man Anthony "The Ant" Spilotro. Rosenthal supervises the operation of the legendary Stardust Resort and Casino, while Spilotro provides protection while also masterminding thefts of jewelry and valuables that lead to his crew being nicknamed the "Hole in the Wall Gang".

== Critical reception ==
Kirkus Reviews called the book "riveting," writing that "Pileggi offers a blow-by-blow account of how organized crime looted the casinos they controlled as silent but deadly partners during the 1970s."

== Film version ==
The book is the basis for the Oscar–nominated 1995 film Casino directed by Martin Scorsese. The screenplay for Casino was by Pileggi and Scorsese. Although Pileggi had already written the book and wanted it published in advance of the film version, Scorsese tried to persuade him to forgo the usual chronology and to release the book after the film. However the book was released the month before the film came out.

Rosenthal and Spilotro were portrayed as Ace Rothstein and Nicky Santoro by Robert De Niro and Joe Pesci, respectively. Sharon Stone, playing Rothstein's wife, Ginger (based on Geri McGee), was nominated for the Academy Award for Best Actress.
