= Joey Aiuppa =

American mobster (1907–1997)

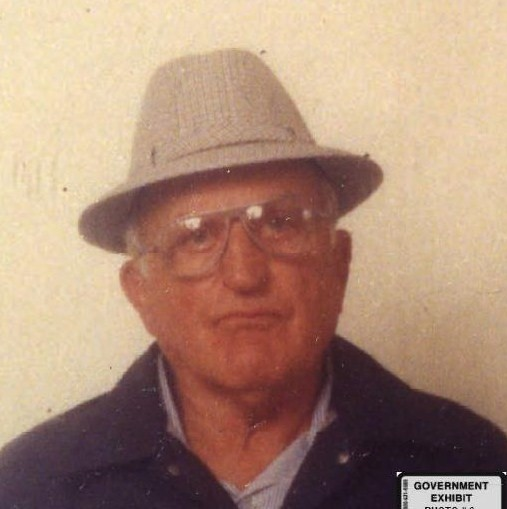
- Aiuppa mug shot, c. 1983
- Born: Joseph John Aiuppa; December 1, 1907; Melrose Park, Illinois, U.S.
- Died: February 22, 1997 (aged 89); Elmhurst, Illinois, U.S.
- Resting place: Queen of Heaven Cemetery, Hillside, Illinois
- Other names: "Joey O'Brien", "Joey O.", "Joey Doves", "Mourning Doves"
- Occupation: Crime boss
- Spouse: Angeline Zito
- Allegiance: Chicago Outfit
- Conviction: Skimming
- Penalty: 28 years imprisonment (1986)

Joseph John Aiuppa (December 1, 1907 – February 22, 1997), also known as "Joey O'Brien" and "Joey Doves", was an American mobster who became a leader of the Chicago Outfit from 1971 until his skimming conviction in 1986.

== Early career ==
Joseph Aiuppa was born in Melrose Park, Illinois, the eldest son of Simone (Sam) Aiuppa (1883–1934) and Rosalia (Rose) Marie Greco (1886–1968), Sicilian immigrants from Lascari, Sicily.

During the 1920s, former boxer Aiuppa rose through the ranks of the Chicago Outfit, beginning as a driver for higher ranking Outfit leaders such as Tony Accardo. He graduated to operate several gambling establishments in Cicero, Illinois. These clubs included bookmaking establishments and underground casinos with secret entrances. In the early 1930s, Aiuppa managed Taylor & Company, ostensibly a furniture manufacturer though in actuality a front for manufacturing illegal slot machines. Aiuppa was a charter member of Local 450 of the Hotel Employees and Restaurant Employees Union. A member of the Capone Mob, Aiuppa also had connections to John Dillinger and the Barker–Karpis Gang. In 1935, Chicago crime files indicated Aiuppa as a trigger man and expert bank robber for Claude Maddox.

Beginning in the late 1940s and well into the 1960s, Aiuppa was in charge of the Cicero district of the Outfit. The Cicero district was the highest-earning territory for decades, going back to Al Capone, who headquartered out of this area while he was in command. Aiuppa eventually owned or operated several establishments in Cicero, including the Frolics, the Towne Hotel, the 411 Club, and others, collectively called the Strip, where prostitution, slot machines, and gambling were available. This was the original "strip" before the mob-controlled casino strip in Las Vegas.

Aiuppa also owned the Navajo Hills golf course outside suburban Chicago for many years. This was one of his many real estate dealings that he purchased out of his share of running the most powerful and successful Outfit territory for decades. Aiuppa operated his real estate holdings under "Rosemar Realty", named after his mother, Rose Marie. From time to time, Aiuppa also put cars or small real estate holdings in her name, as he would rarely keep any assets in his name except for the home in which he resided in Oak Brook, Illinois. He also used other relatives, including brothers and later nephews, to hold title to his many constantly changing real estate assets in and around the Chicago area.

== "Joey O'Brien" and "Joey Doves" ==
For almost 40 years, Aiuppa's original nickname was his old boxing name, "Joey O'Brien", often abbreviated in mob circles to just "O'Brien" or "Joey O." Irish boxers got paid more on the fight card in those days so Aiuppa chose an Irish name to fight under. This was one of his last known jobs before he started as a driver for the Outfit.

In a move reminiscent of Al Capone's prosecution for tax evasion, Aiuppa was convicted in 1966 of the unlawful possession and transportation of mourning doves across state lines. Under the Migratory Bird Treaty Act of 1918, possessing more than 24 doves per person is illegal outside of hunting season. In September 1962, as part of Robert F. Kennedy's crackdown on the Chicago Outfit, FBI agents in Kansas searching Aiuppa's car discovered 563 frozen doves. Following a series of appeals, Aiuppa was eventually sentenced in August 1966 and received a three-month jail sentence and a $1,000 fine. As a result, Aiuppa gained various nicknames such as "Joey Doves", "Joey the Doves", "Doves", and "Mourning Doves".

== Leadership of the Chicago Outfit ==
Starting in the 1940s the Outfit was run by Paul Ricca, and later Ricca and Tony Accardo, operating behind the scenes through a series of front bosses—starting first with Accardo, followed by Sam Giancana, Felix Alderisio, Jackie Cerone, Aiuppa and others. This arrangement allowed Ricca and Accardo to escape prosecution for years.

Giancana replaced Accardo as front boss in 1957, when Accardo came under scrutiny by the IRS. No major business transactions, and certainly no "hits", took place without Ricca and Accardo's knowledge and approval. Ricca died in 1972, leaving Accardo as the sole power behind the scenes.

Joey Aiuppa took on greater responsibility within the Outfit after the imprisonment of Sam Giancana for contempt in 1965 and Giancana's flight to Mexico after his release from prison in 1966. Giancana was replaced as front boss by Sam Battaglia, until Battaglia was convicted of Hobbs Act violations in 1967. Felix Anthony "Milwaukee Phil" Alderisio was next in line until he was imprisoned for extortion in 1971, at which point Aiuppa succeeded him.

Sometime following the June 1975 murder of Giancana, Aiuppa bought a house in Palm Springs, California, as had several other Chicago mobsters. Accardo and Aiuppa continued to oversee the Outfit's operations from Palm Springs.

== Conviction and retirement ==
The Chicago Outfit played a significant role in the expansion of Las Vegas' casinos, in large part due to the Outfit's close relationship with the Central States Pension Fund, the pension fund covering Teamsters in the Midwest. During Aiuppa's tenure as front boss, the Chicago Outfit strengthened its presence in Las Vegas after the Central States Pension Fund loaned $62.75 million to Argent Corporation, a business established by San Diego real estate agent, Allen R. Glick, to take over ownership of the Stardust and Fremont casinos; Glick's corporation later acquired two more casino properties. The Nevada Gaming Commission revoked Argent's and Glick's gaming licenses in 1979 for permitting skimming of an estimated seven million dollars from the four casinos Argent owned.

Aiuppa was among fifteen mobsters from the Chicago, Kansas City, Cleveland and Milwaukee crime families indicted on September 30, 1983 on federal charges related to the skimming of millions of dollars from the Teamsters' Central States pension fund and the Stardust, Fremont and Hacienda hotel casinos in Las Vegas. The indictments followed a five-year Federal Bureau of Investigation (FBI) probe. Joseph Agosto, a Kansas City mobster and a Las Vegas show producer, who produced the Folies Bergere at the Tropicana hotel casino, turned state's evidence and testified against the mob bosses. After a four-month trial, Aiuppa was convicted of conspiring to embezzle untaxed gambling profits along with Cerone, Carl "Corky" Civella, Angelo "The Hook" LaPietra and Carl "Tuffy" DeLuna on January 22, 1986. Milwaukee organized crime boss Frank Balistrieri was convicted in the same case in December 1985. Aiuppa was sentenced on March 25, 1986 to 28 years in federal prison.

Joseph Ferriola took over Aiuppa's role as "front boss" in 1985 following Aiuppa's indictment. He was replaced by Aiuppa's driver and protégé, Samuel Carlisi, after being diagnosed with cancer in 1988.

== Later years and family ==
After serving nearly ten years of his sentence, Aiuppa was released from the U.S. Bureau of Prisons Federal Medical Center at Rochester, Minnesota on January 19, 1996. On February 22, 1997, Aiuppa died at Elmhurst Memorial Hospital in Elmhurst, Illinois. He was buried in Hillside, Illinois at the Queen of Heaven Cemetery.

Aiuppa's nephew Sam Aiuppa was a member of the IATSE Projectionists Local 110 union in Chicago. Local 110 was once widely believed to be one of the most mobbed-up locals in the United States; Sam Giancana's nephew, Andrew Giancana, was on the board for the IATSE and relatives of Accardo, Battaglia, and other Outfit members held "no show" jobs at movie houses whose employees were represented by the union.

== In popular culture ==
The film Casino, directed by Martin Scorsese in 1995, is based on the Chicago Outfit's ties to the Las Vegas casino industry. The events that occur in the movie are based on the relationship between the associates of the Chicago Mob and Las Vegas businessman Frank "Lefty" Rosenthal. The character of Remo Gaggi, played by Pasquale Cajano, is based on Aiuppa. Other portrayals include Robert De Niro as main character Sam "Ace" Rothstein, based on Rosenthal, and Joe Pesci as Nicky Santoro, based on Chicago enforcer Anthony Spilotro.

American Mafia
Preceded by Felix Alderisio	Chicago Outfit Boss; 1971–1986	Succeeded by Joseph Ferriola
