= Frank Rosenthal =

American gambler (1929–2008)

- Born: Frank Lawrence Rosenthal; June 12, 1929; Chicago, Illinois, U.S.
- Died: October 13, 2008 (aged 79); Miami Beach, Florida, U.S.
- Occupations: Bookmaker; Casino owner
- Years active: 1950–1987
- Spouse: Geri McGee (m. 1969; div. 1981)
- Children: 3
- Allegiance: Chicago Outfit

Frank Lawrence "Lefty" Rosenthal (June 12, 1929 – October 13, 2008) was an American professional sports gambler, Las Vegas casino executive, organized crime associate, and FBI informant. Rosenthal, who was once called "the greatest living expert on sports gambling" by Sports Illustrated, is credited with bringing increased exposure to sports betting to Las Vegas in the 1970s.

Rosenthal's life and career in Las Vegas served as the basis of Martin Scorsese's 1995 film Casino, where he was portrayed by Robert De Niro and renamed Sam "Ace" Rothstein.

== Early years ==
=== Illinois ===
Rosenthal was born in Chicago, to a Jewish family and grew up on the city's West Side. As a youth, he learned sports betting in the bleachers of Wrigley Field and would often skip classes to attend Chicago sporting events. Rosenthal's father also owned racehorses, whereby he became familiar with betting odds and percentages at a young age.

By the mid-1950s, Rosenthal was working with the Chicago Outfit. Chosen for his expert odds-making ability, he ran the biggest illegal bookmaking office in the USA on behalf of the Mafia—specifically, the Outfit. Based in Cicero, under the guise of a home improvement company, Rosenthal and the Outfit bought "contracts" to fix sporting events. After being indicted as a conspirator on multiple sports bribery charges, Rosenthal moved the operation to North Bay Village in Miami, to avoid attention.

=== Miami ===
While in Miami he worked under David Yaras among others. By 1961, Rosenthal had acquired a national reputation as a sports bettor, oddsmaker, and handicapper, and in Miami, he was frequently seen in the company of prominent Outfit members Jackie Cerone and Fiore Buccieri. At this time, Rosenthal was issued with a subpoena to appear before U.S. Senator John McClellan's subcommittee on Gambling and Organized Crime, accused of match-fixing. He invoked the Fifth Amendment 37 times and was never charged. As a result, Rosenthal was barred from racing establishments in Florida.

Despite his frequent arrests for illegal gambling and bookmaking, Rosenthal was convicted only once, after pleading no contest in 1963 to allegedly bribing a NYU player to shave points for a college basketball game in North Carolina. He was also a suspect in multiple business and car bombings in the greater Miami area during the 1960s. It was at this time that the FBI opened an ongoing case file on Rosenthal, which amassed 300 pages. In order to once again escape police attention, Rosenthal moved to Las Vegas, in 1968.

== Las Vegas career ==
At age 40, Rosenthal began working as a pit manager at the Stardust, where his exceptional gambling knowledge became recognized, advancing him to the CEO position at Argent Corporation, owner of Nevada Properties. A major promoter of sports gambling, Rosenthal secretly ran the Stardust, Fremont, Marina, and Hacienda casinos when they were controlled by the Chicago Outfit. He also created the first sports book that operated from within a casino, making the Stardust one of the world's leading centers for sports gambling. Another Rosenthal innovation was hiring more female blackjack dealers, which in one year helped double the Stardust's income.

In 1976, the FBI and LVMPD discovered that Rosenthal was secretly running four casinos without a state gaming license and held a hearing to determine his eligibility to obtain a license. The hearing was headed by NGCB Chairman (and future U.S. Senate Majority Leader) Harry Reid. Rosenthal was denied a license because of his arrest record and his documented reputation as an organized-crime associate, particularly his boyhood friendship with Chicago mob enforcer Anthony Spilotro.

Rosenthal married Geri McGee on May 4, 1969. McGee already had a daughter, Robin L. Marmor, from a previous marriage with ex-husband Lenny Marmor. Rosenthal and McGee later had two children together, Steven and Stephanie. There were infidelities on both sides, with McGee secretly having an affair with Spilotro. The marriage ended in divorce in 1981, with Rosenthal attributing the failure primarily to McGee's inability to escape her dependence on alcohol and drugs. After leaving Rosenthal and stealing a portion of his savings, McGee died at a motel in L.A. on November 9, 1982, at age 46, of an apparent drug overdose. Her death was ruled accidental, from a combination of Valium, cocaine, and alcohol.

== Later years and death ==
On October 4, 1982, Rosenthal survived an assassination attempt in Las Vegas, in which a bomb attached to the gasoline tank was detonated when he started his car. The 1981 Cadillac Eldorado was in the parking lot of Tony Roma's restaurant at 620 E. Sahara Avenue. Rosenthal survived because of a metal plate under the driver's seat, installed by General Motors in the model to correct a balancing problem.

Myram Borders, who heard the explosion, said that after exiting the car Rosenthal shouted "They're trying to kill me, they're trying to kill me!". When she asked who was trying to kill him, Rosenthal did not answer. While none were charged for the bombing, Milwaukee mob boss Frank Balistrieri was suspected to be responsible. Balistrieri, nicknamed the "Mad Bomber" to law enforcement, was heard via wiretap to be blaming Rosenthal for the legal problems the mob-controlled casinos were suffering. Similarly, just weeks before the bombing, Balistrieri told his sons he intended to get "full satisfaction" for Rosenthal's perceived wrongdoing. Other likely suspects include Kansas City mob bosses, who were recorded on an FBI wiretap tape calling Rosenthal "crazy"; Spilotro, either acting with others or on behalf of the Outfit; and outlaw bikers who were friends of Rosenthal's ex-wife, Geri McGee.

Rosenthal left Las Vegas about six months later, and moved to Laguna Niguel, California. He focused on raising his children, who were both accomplished youth swimmers. Rosenthal was later formally banned from Las Vegas casinos in 1987, when he was placed in "the Black Book", making him persona non grata—unable to work in, or even enter, any Nevada casino because of his alleged ties to organized crime. However, in June 1990, Rosenthal won an unprecedented court ruling to have his name removed. Rosenthal was represented in the hearing by future Las Vegas Mayor Oscar Goodman. Goodman and Rosenthal lost, however, in the Nevada Supreme Court in 1991, and Rosenthal's ban was reinstated.

Rosenthal later moved from Laguna Niguel to Boca Raton, Florida, where he ran a sports bar called "Croc's", and finally to Miami Beach, where he ran a sports betting website and worked as a consultant for several offshore sports betting companies.

Rosenthal died on October 13, 2008, at the age of 79, of an apparent heart attack. After his death, it was disclosed by Las Vegas Review-Journal reporter Jane Ann Morrison that Rosenthal had been a top echelon informant for the FBI; his wife, Geri, was also an FBI informant. The FBI released Rosenthal's records to the public in 2011.

== In popular culture ==
The film Casino (1995), directed by Martin Scorsese with a screenplay co-written by Nicholas Pileggi from his biography Casino: Love and Honor in Las Vegas, is largely based on Rosenthal's time in Las Vegas. The film takes some creative license, but is broadly accurate to Rosenthal's story and his relationship with Anthony Spilotro, on which the character Nicky Santoro (played by Joe Pesci) is based. Rosenthal is represented by the character Sam "Ace" Rothstein (played by Robert De Niro). The character of Ginger McKenna Rothstein, his wife in the film (played by Sharon Stone), is based on Geri McGee, Rosenthal's wife in real life.

In an interview about the movie, Rosenthal stated that his character portrayed by Robert De Niro was quite but not fully similar to him, namely "7 on a scale of 1 to 10", and when asked about Stone's portrayal of his wife, he stated, "I really wouldn't want to get into that area. It's an area that is distasteful and brings back bad memories. I wouldn't be willing to dispute what you just said, but I certainly wouldn't confirm it."
