= Thomas J. Maloney (judge) =

American judge

Thomas J. Maloney (1925–2008) was a judge in Cook County, Illinois who served from 1977 until his indictment for bribery in 1991. Since 1981, the court was being investigated by the FBI in Operation Greylord, and he was eventually convicted on four counts of accepting bribes (including fixing three murder cases). He served 12 years of a 15-year prison term from 1994 to 2007.

The web magazine Judiciary Report said that Maloney "easily qualifies as one of the worst judges in history".

== Career ==
Thomas Maloney had been a boxer in his youth, and started as a lawyer in 1952. He had underworld connections as a lawyer, and shared an office for some time with power broker Edward Vrdolyak. Before joining the bench, he had facilitated a payment to a judge who subsequently acquitted Harry Aleman of murder.

In 1977, Maloney was named a judge by the Illinois Supreme Court, and shortly thereafter he came to be known to attorneys such as Robert Cooley and William Swano and in criminal circles as a judge who could be bought. Generally, the negotiations were arranged and bribes paid through the use of a "bagman," or intermediary. For some years, bailiff Lucius Robinson acted as his bagman, but when the FBI investigations turned up the heat, co-lawyer and friend Robert McGee acted as bagman.

However, Maloney's public image was that of a tough judge, known for imposing tough sentences and castigating gang members as "the lowest sorts of cowards". In his courtroom, he sat under a framed portrait of U.S. Supreme Court Chief Justice John Marshall. For a time, he was one of six so-called "heater" judges who were assigned high-profile cases.

An example of alleged toughness was a unanimous Illinois Supreme Court ruling June 9, 1997, permitting death row prisoner William Bracy a chance to pursue evidence that Maloney was unfairly harsh when sentencing Bracy, to deflect suspicion of taking bribes to let off other defendants.

In 1988, the FBI pressed charges based on Operation Greylord and the associated Operation Gambat, and a grand jury proceedings were initiated. Erstwhile bagman Robinson testified, under a grant of immunity. At the time, Maloney was continuing to practice.

In June 1991, Maloney was indicted, causing considerable surprise in Cook County. In the ensuing trial, he claimed in his defense that Swano and Robinson had operated a scam known as "rainmaking," where the participants never pass the bribe along to the judge. However, Maloney's financial records indicated that he had purchased "hundreds of money orders with cash from unknown sources", in order to hide the fact that he was spending more money than he received from all legitimate sources. On April 16, 1993, the jury convicted Maloney on all counts.

=== Convicted cases ===
In the eventual trial (1991–1994), the jury found convincing evidence in the four following cases:

1. On Leong mafia acquittal: Four years after joining the bench (May 1981), Maloney acquitted hitman Lenny Chow and two other members of the On Leong mafia in a murder case where William Chin had been shot in Chicago's Chinatown. Mafia representative William Moy told noted mafia lawyer Robert Cooley that he wanted a guaranteed not-guilty verdict. Ward secretary and political boss Pat Marcy (subsequently indicted) assured Cooley that the Judge could be bought but would be expensive. Moy agreed to pay $100,000, a portion of which Marcy gave to Maloney for the fix. At trial, Judge Maloney found a dying declaration by Chin as unreliable, thus acquitting the defendants. Subsequently, Cooley became an informant, and tape recordings of a conversation with Pat Marcy constituted a key piece of testimony.
2. Ronald Roby: In 1982, Maloney gave a mild sentence to Roby (probation) in a deceptive practices case. The bribe was arranged by attorney William Swano through bagman Lucius Robinson, who had earlier been identified by Maloney as his dealing man. "Roby testified that a bribe was to paid out of his $5,000 'fee.' Soon after, according to Robinson's testimony, he passed along $2,300 to Judge Maloney at a McCormick Place lounge Maloney had suggested as a meeting place. Robinson also testified that a few days later, while riding alone with Judge Maloney in the judges' elevator, Maloney gave him $200-$300 for his work as a bagman on the case."
3. Owen Jones acquittal in felony murder: Jones was charged of beating a man to death with a pipe during a burglary. Swano approached Maloney through Lucius Robinson, but FBI investigations had started and Swano was approached by attorney Robert McGee in court, saying that Robinson had become "too hot" as bagman, and that McGee, who had earlier practiced with Maloney, would be taking over now. Maloney suggested that Jones be convicted on voluntary manslaughter, thus reducing his sentence from twenty to nine years. Jones' mother agreed to pay the $4,000-$5,000 bribe. After trial, Jones was found guilty of voluntary manslaughter and sentenced to nine years.
4. El Rukn gang bribe: Two members of the El Rukn gang were charged with double murder in June 1985. Initially, Swano arranged for a $20,000 bribe (of which $10,000 was to be paid to Maloney). The money was paid by Alan Knox, an El Rukn "general", and Swano handed over a file folder with the money to McGee at a restaurant. However, by then, the investigations had intensified, and three eyewitnesses identified a defendant as the murderer. Maloney had second thoughts and later McGee called Swano on June 19 and told him that the deal was off. The two defendants were subsequently sentenced to death.

== Impact ==
After Maloney was convicted, a number of cases involving El Rukn members were re-opened.

Altogether, seventeen judges were sentenced in the investigations into Operation Greylord. However, as the Chicago Tribune put it in his obituary, Maloney was "the first — and remains the only — Cook County judge to be convicted of rigging murder cases for cash". Mental Floss describes it as "the worst of the worst was the not-so-honorable Thomas J. Maloney".

Other cases involving judges accepting cash in murder cases include James McGettrick of the Cleveland, Ohio area Cuyahoga County Court.

=== Bracy v. Gramley, 520 U.S. 889 (1997) ===
In 1981, the gangster William J. Bracy was convicted of triple murder and sentenced to death by Maloney. After Maloney's conviction, he demanded that his judgment be investigated for possibly being influenced by bribery. The Supreme Court in 1997 held that a sufficient factual case had been made for discovery of facts in the matter under habeas corpus law.

=== Robert Gacho v. Anthony Wills (2021) ===
In 1982, Robert Gacho and co-defendant Dino Titone were convicted of kidnapping and murders of two men. In 2021, the 7th Circuit Court granted Gacho a new trial after it was revealed Judge Maloney took a $10,000 bribe from Titone for an acquittal. Gacho refused to pay the bribe to the Judge and the Judge engaged in compensatory or sexual favors camouflaging bias against Gacho. (The judge had a reputation for treating defendants harshly if they did not pay him).
