= When Corruption Was King =

2004 memoir by Robert Cooley and with Hillel Levin

- North American first edition cover
- Author: Robert Cooley, with Hillel Levin
- Language: English
- Genre: Memoir
- Publisher: Carroll & Graf
- Publication date: August 10, 2004
- Publication place: United States
- Media type: Print (hardcover)
- Pages: 336 pages
- ISBN: 0-7867-1583-9

When Corruption Was King: How I Helped the Mob Rule Chicago, Then Brought the Outfit Down is a memoir written by Robert Cooley, a lawyer who once worked for Mafia members in Chicago but eventually turned in his former clients. The book is co-written by journalist Hillel Levin and was published by Perseus Publishing in 2004. It details Cooley's friendships with Pat Marcy, Harry Aleman "The Hook," and Tony Spilotro and tells the story of the nine trials in which Cooley helped the U.S. Organized Crime Strike Force convict several key Mafia figures.

== Background ==
Robert Cooley was the Chicago Mafia's "Mechanic" - a fixer of court cases. During the 1970s and 1980s, Cooley bribed judges, court clerks, and cops to keep his Mob clients, including hit men, bookies, racketeers, and crooked politicians, out of jail. Paid for his services, he enjoyed the protection of the men he served. Through the 1990s, Cooley became the star witness in a series of trials that took down the Chicago Outfit, arguably the most powerful Mafia family in the history of organized crime.

== Synopsis ==
Cooley's account tells how he chased crooked acquittals for the likes of Pat Marcy, originally an Al Capone protégé who had become the Mob's key political operative; Mafia Capo and gambling czar Marco D'Amico; and notorious hit man Harry Aleman. He dined with Mob bosses and shared "last suppers" with friends before their gangland executions. Cooley watched as Marcy and the Mob controlled the courts, the cops, and the politicians. Then he walked into the office of the U.S. Organized Crime Strike Force and of his own free will agreed to wear a wire on the same Mafia overlords who had made him a player. Cooley's tapes and testimony would be at the center of nine landmark trials that together exposed and then broke the Mob's unprecedented stranglehold on Chicago's government and court system.

== Publication and reception ==
The book is co-written by journalist Hillel Levin and was published by Perseus Publishing in 2004.

Publishers Weekly praised the book, but described the prose as "more workmanlike than memorable", while a reviewer for Booklist described it as a "mesmerizing treatise on organized crime". Reviewer Mark V. Muller praised the book, describing it as an "overwhelming" and "gripping" account of Cooley's life.

== Film adaptation ==
In March 2011, Paramount Pictures announced in Variety Mark Wahlberg's attachment to produce and possibly star in the movie adaptation of When Corruption Was King, along with Twilight Saga producers Temple Hill. Variety reported that Frank Baldwin is adapting the script based on Robert Cooley's memoirs "about a southside Chicago lawyer who becomes the mob's most trusted attorney until, as a state witness, he brings the organization down."
