= Himmel =

Himmel may refer to:

== People ==
- Erwin Leo Himmel (born 1956), Austrian automobile designer
- Friedrich Heinrich Himmel (1765–1814), German composer
- Gerhard Himmel (born 1965), German wrestler
- Joseph J. Himmel (1855–1924), American Jesuit missionary
- Paul Himmel (1914–2009), American fashion and documentary photographer

=== Fictional characters ===
- Himmel, a character from the manga/anime series Frieren: Beyond Journey's End

== Other uses ==
- Himmel, Missouri, a ghost town in the United States
- Himmel Park, urban park in central Tucson, Arizona

== See also ==
- Himmel und Erde, traditional German dish
- Himmel, Amor und Zwirn, 1960 West German comedy film
- In re Himmel, a Supreme Court of Illinois case
