= Organized Crime and Racketeering Section =

Agency overview
- Formed: July 1954
- Dissolved: 2010
- Superseding agency: Violent Crime and Racketeering Section; Organized Crime and Gang Section

Jurisdictional structure
- Operations jurisdiction: United States

Operational structure
- Agency executive: Deputy Assistant Attorney General, Criminal Division
- Parent agency: Attorney General; Department of Justice; Criminal Division
- Child agency: Strike Forces

The Organized Crime & Racketeering Section (OCRS) supervised efforts of the United States Department of Justice Criminal Division against organized crime, and oversaw enforcement of statutes often associated with racketeering activities, disrupting the income base for crime syndicates. OCRS had specific supervisory authority over the "extortionate credit provisions" of the Consumer Credit Protection Act of 1968, the Gambling Devices Act of 1962, the Organized Crime Control Act of 1970 and other laws relating to gambling, extortion, bribery, racketeering and liquor control. OCRS was a section of the United States Department of Justice Criminal Division until its split and merger in 2010 into the Violent Crime and Racketeering Section (VCRS) and the Organized Crime and Gang Section (OCGS).

In the words of Attorney General Dick Thornburgh; the "Organized Crime and Racketeering Section... coordinates all federal enforcement against organized crime." Thornburgh would ultimately prove the slow death of the OCRS, when in 1989 he merged the Strike Forces with the AUSAs.

== History ==
The early half of the twentieth century in the United States saw the continued rise of international criminal syndicates, and their continued growth in American cities. Plethora federal agencies were created to combat this growth of crime, whereas in the nineteenth century, the majority of investigations into organized crime had been performed by the private detective agency, The Pinkertons. At one point, the Pinkertons had more reserve officers than the standing Army of the United States, and this was seen as a potential hostile force. The Federal Bureau of Investigation (FBI) was created early in the new century, and other agencies followed. With the new century seeing the majority of investigations falling into the hands of federal agents, the investigating authority into criminal networks no longer belonged to the highest bidder, but to the Executive and Legislative branches.

After the successful efforts of the Kefauver Committee to investigate organized crime in the United States, the Department of Justice, the Department of the Treasury, and others in law enforcement saw the importance of establishing specifically dedicated efforts to combat the growing influence of the Cosa nostra and other crime syndicates.

=== Special Rackets Unit (1951–1954) ===
In 1951, in response to the Kefauver hearings, the Criminal Division created the Special Rackets Unit. This unit would eventually become the OCRS.

=== Creation of the Organized Crime and Racketeering Section (1954–1957) ===
California had been a rare exception to the growing criminal influence, and by 1953, both Warren Olney III and Earl Warren – who had been two key figures in California's anticrime fight – were now working for the federal government. Warren was assigned to the Supreme Court, and he brought Olney with him to run the Criminal Division for Attorney General Herbert Brownell Jr.

When the OCRS was created in 1954 under the direction of Criminal Division Chief Warren Olney III and Attorney General Herbert Brownell Jr., it had no legislative mandate, but it still began to organize information on criminal networks. According to Brownell, when it was created it was a "small intelligence function." However, it did not take long for the section to make progress against racketeering and labor racketeering, with the cooperation of the Special Anti-Crime Section (SACS). In this early era, with only a few attorneys, OCRS gathered and analyzed information on organized crime and racketeering, while also acting as a clearinghouse for information from various investigative agencies. By 1957, the OCRS was beginning to coordinate with federal agencies to map crime families and syndicates to geographical areas.

Brownell's time was too focused on other areas of criminal justice, however: the fight to create a Civil Rights Act in opposition to the Southern coalition, and combatting internal security penetrations in the federal government were more pressing to him. Brownell retired from federal service in 1957, after a tireless fight alongside Olney to create the Civil Rights Division. Olney was appointed Director of the Administrative Office of the United States Courts in 1958. However, the section they fostered into existence remained after their departure.

=== Strike Forces (1966–1989) ===
The United States Organized Crime Strike Force was first created as the "Buffalo Project," and operated as the first "field force," of the OCRS in Buffalo, New York, and would later be known as the Buffalo Strike Force. The Buffalo Strike Force coordinated the efforts of the OCRS and federal law enforcement agencies. More than 30 people were on this team, under the direction of Bob Peloquin. This team was composed of members from the Bureau of Customs, the Internal Revenue Service, the Bureau of Narcotics and Dangerous Drugs, the Bureau of Alcohol, Tobacco, Firearms and Explosives, the Royal Canadian Mounted Police, and others. By 1989, there were 14 Strike Forces across the country, operating as independent prosecutorial and investigative teams coordinated against organized crime. The Strike Forces were expanded after this first experiment for the purpose of finding and prosecuting illegal racketeering. They were formed partially in a congressional effort led by Senator Robert F. Kennedy, alongside the efforts of Ramsey Clark.

=== 1989 ===
In 1989, Attorney General Dick Thornburgh presented a proposal to the Director to begin the process of merging and consolidating certain efforts of the Criminal Division, including the Strike Forces. on December 26, 1989, U.S. Attorney General Order 1386–89 was signed by Attorney General Thornburgh, and the Strike Forces were merged with the AUSAs. The name "Strike Forces" at this time was changed to Organized Crime Strike Force Units (OCFSU). Within the next six months, over 25% of the organized crime prosecutors in the Department of Justice tendered their resignations. Further resignations followed.

=== 2010 ===
The OCRS merged in 2010 into the Violent Crime and Racketeering Section (VRCS) and the Organized Crime and Gang Section (OCGS).
