= Greater Grand Crossing, Chicago =

Community area in Chicago, Illinois

Greater Grand Crossing
- Community area
- Community Area 69 – Greater Grand Crossing
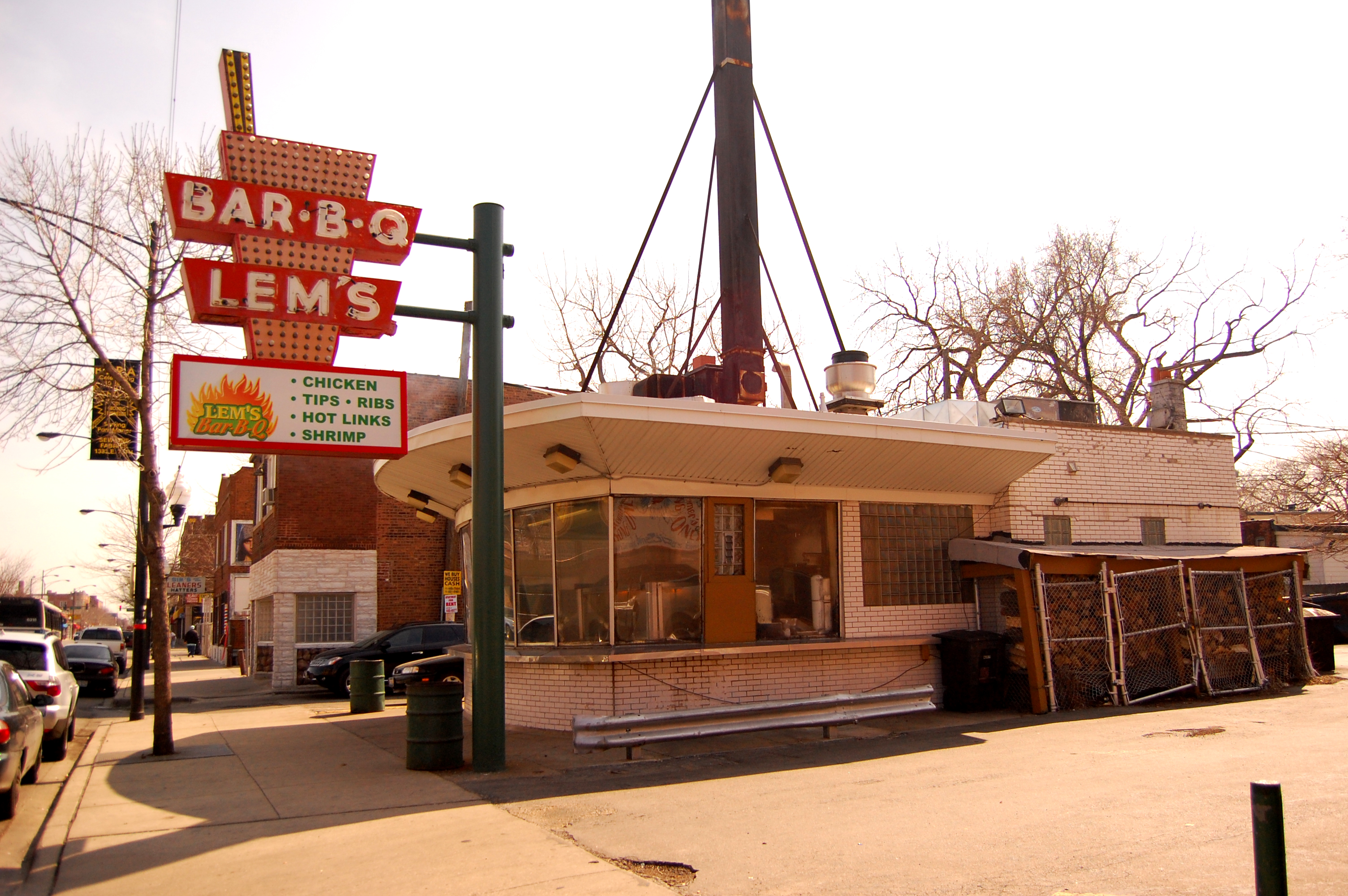
- Lem's Bar-B-Q restaurant on Grand Crossing's 75th Street business district.

- Location within the city of Chicago
- Coordinates: 41°45.6′N 87°36.6′W
- Country: United States
- State: Illinois
- County: Cook
- City: Chicago
- Named for: LS&MS and IC's Grand Crossing
- Neighborhoods: List: Grand Crossing; Greater Grand Crossing; Park Manor; Winneconna Parkway

Area
  - Total: 3.56 sq mi (9.22 km^{2})

Population (2024)
  - Total: 29,143
  - Density: 8,190/sq mi (3,160/km^{2})

Demographics (2024)
  - Black: 88.1%
  - White: 1.5%
  - Hispanic: 7.2%
  - Asian: 0.7%
  - Other: 2.5%
- Time zone: UTC-6 (CST)
  - Summer (DST): UTC-5 (CDT)
- ZIP Codes: parts of 60619, 60620, 60621 and 60637
- Median income: $40,388
- Source: U.S. Census, Record Information Services

Greater Grand Crossing is one of the 77 community areas of Chicago, Illinois. It is located on the city's South Side.

== History ==
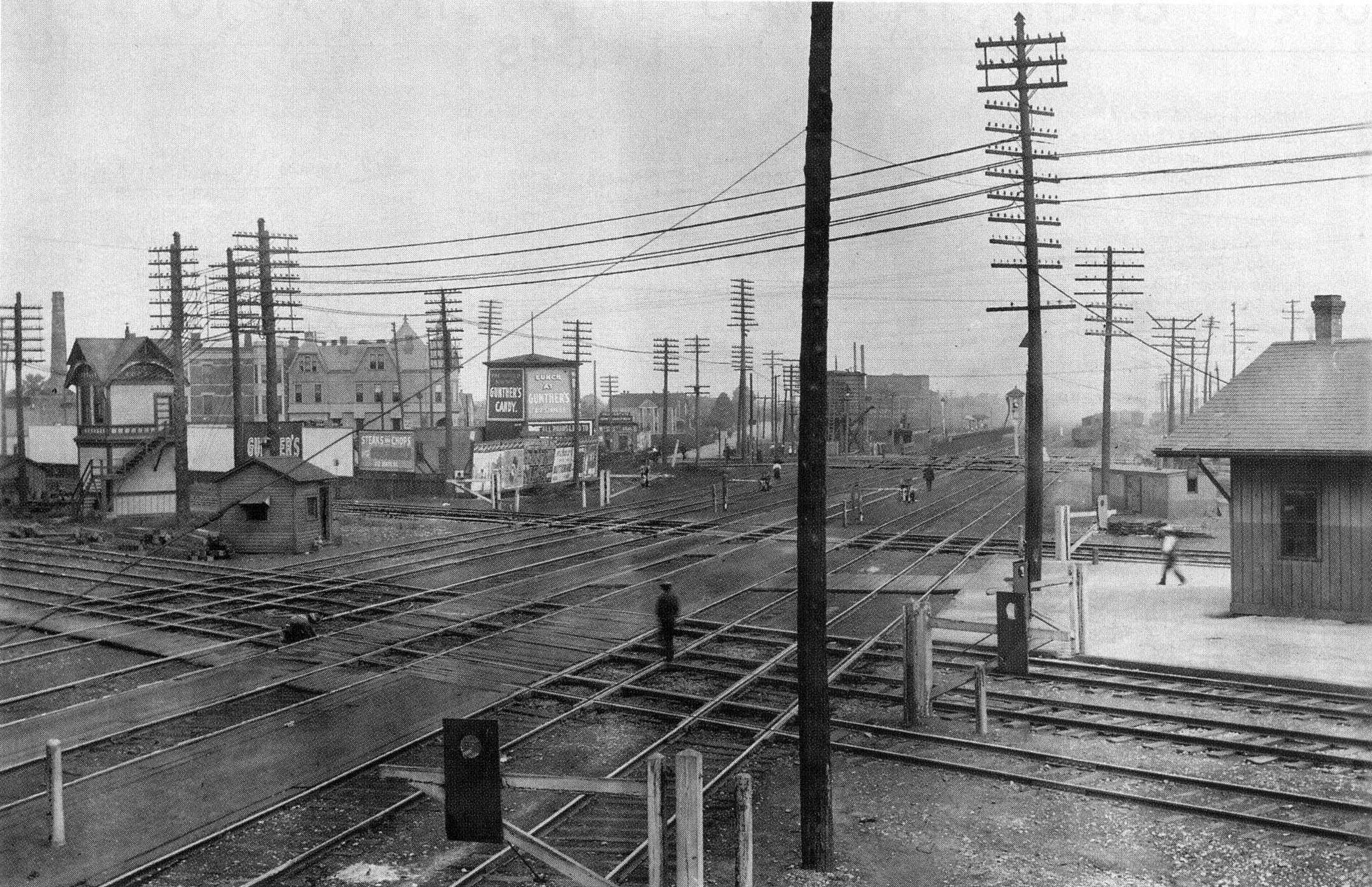
1902 view of crossing, before grade separation

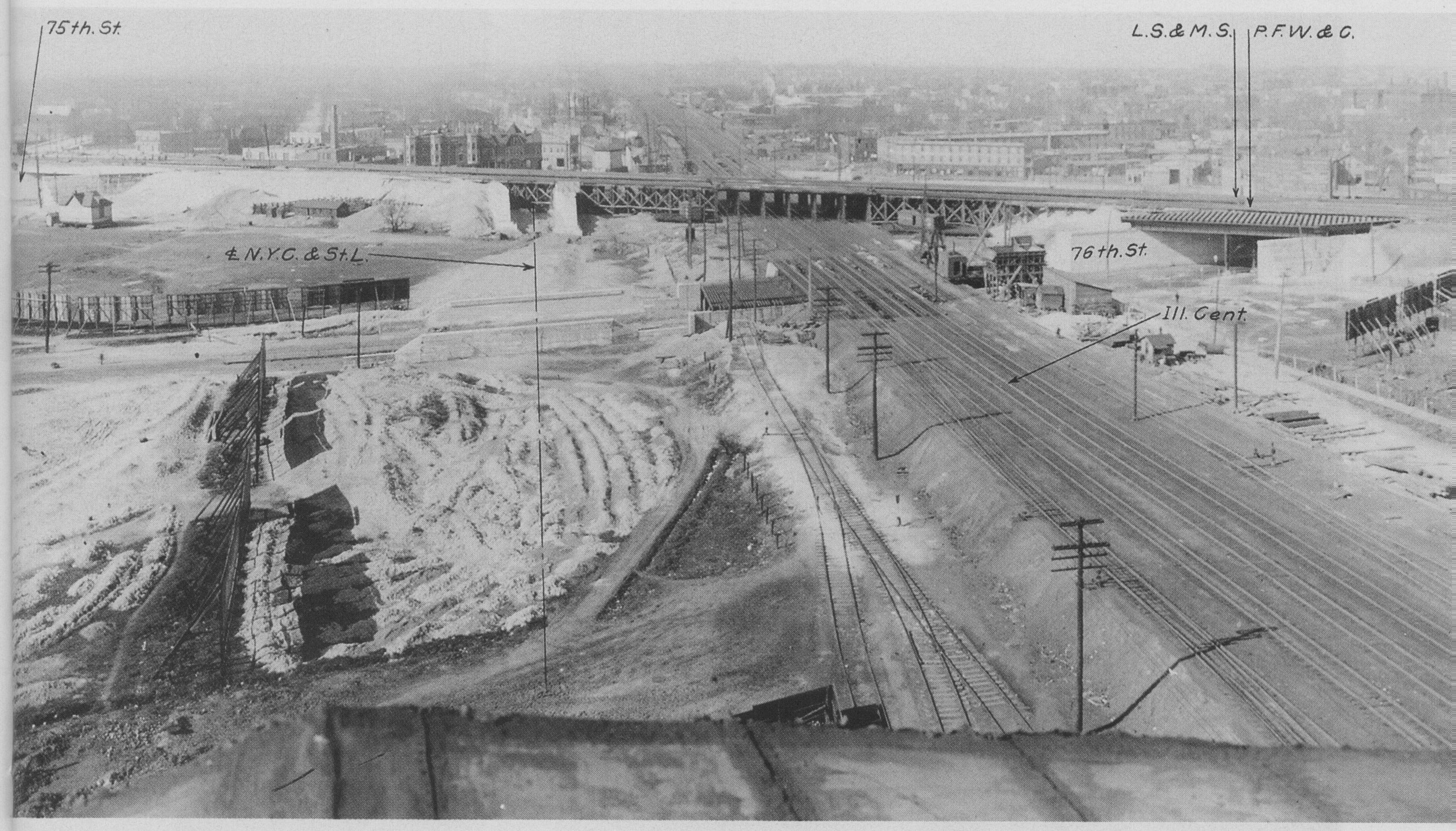
1912 view of crossing, after grade separation

=== Etymology ===
The name "Grand Crossing" comes from an 1853 right-of-way feud between the Lake Shore and Michigan Southern Railway and the Illinois Central Railroad that led to a frog war and a crash that killed 18 people. The crash was the result of Roswell B. Mason (later to serve as mayor of Chicago) illegally constructing railroad tracks, on behalf of the Illinois Central, across another railroad company's tracks. Due to the lack of safety at the crossing, trains made complete stops here and therefore industry developed around the area to cater to the railroad workers.

=== Nineteenth century ===
The area was developed by Paul Cornell, the developer of what is now Hyde Park, Chicago, throughout the 1870s. The greater development brought its own hazards, as the railroad crossing had no space for safe pedestrian traffic; contemporary estimates suggested that the trains killed about 20 pedestrians each year. When the city council chartered a special train in 1902 to visit and investigate the situation, that train killed a 15-year-old schoolgirl. Within months, the council passed legislation to establish a grade separation; work was complete by 1912.

Greater Grand Crossing was historically a railroad suburb made up of five, independently developed, older ethnic neighborhoods. The Grand Crossing and Brookline neighborhoods were predominantly made up of German immigrant craftsmen, farmers and factory workers; Essex had residents of English, Irish and Scottish immigrants who worked for the railroads; Brookdale was settled mostly by Chicago-born residents employed in the building trades and by the railroads; and Park Manor, the last of these smaller neighborhoods to develop, had residents who were predominantly of east-coast Yankee stock.

=== Twentieth century ===
At the start of the twentieth century, portions of Greater Grand Crossing like other neighborhoods in Chicago made the transition from open space and farmland to bungalow neighborhood.

== Demographics ==
By the 1930s, the railroad workers residing in the neighborhood were joined by Swedes and Italians. Throughout the next two decades, African Americans began moving into the neighborhood from the overcrowded Black Belt and that's when Grand Crossing's White residents began to move out of the neighborhood. During the 1950s, the Black population of the neighborhood rose from 6% to 86%.

According to data from the 2014–2018 American Community Survey compiled by the Chicago Metropolitan Agency for Planning, there were 30,805 people and 12,230 households in Greater Grand Crossing. The racial makeup of the area was 1.1% White, 96.2% African American, and 1.5% from other races. Hispanic or Latino of any race were 1.2% of the population.

In the area, the population was spread out, with 32.4% under the age of 19, 17.6% from 20 to 34, 18.6% from 35 to 49, 19.5% from 50 to 64, and 12.0% who were 65 years of age or older. The median age was 35.2 years compared to 34.3 years.

Historical population
Census	Pop.	Note	%±
1930	60,007		—
1940	61,554		2.6%
1950	61,753		0.3%
1960	63,169		2.3%
1970	54,414		−13.9%
1980	45,218		−16.9%
1990	38,644		−14.5%
2000	38,619		−0.1%
2010	37,465		−3.0%
2020	31,471		−16.0%

== Education ==
In 2024, 20.6 percent of adults over the age of 25 had a bachelor's degree or higher, an increase from 12.4 percent in 2000. 85.0 percent of adults had graduated high school, an increase from 74.7 percent in 2000.

== Transportation ==
The CTA's Red Line provides 24/7 service to the Greater Grand Crossing neighborhood at the 69th Street and 79th Street stations. Additionally, the Metra Electric line provides commuter rail service at the 75th Street station at the intersection of East 75th Street and South Chicago Avenue; the railroad crossing that gave the neighborhood its name.

== Politics ==
The Greater Grand Crossing community area has supported the Democratic Party in the past two presidential elections. In the 2016 presidential election, the Greater Grand Crossing cast 12,647 votes for Hillary Clinton and cast 233 votes for Donald Trump (96.68% to 1.78%). Despite Clinton's 94.60% margin of victory, it was only her 16th best finish in the City of Chicago. In the 2012 presidential election, Greater Grand Crossing cast 15,408 votes for Barack Obama and cast 89 votes for Mitt Romney (99.23% to 0.57%). Despite Obama's 98.66% margin of victory, it was only his 11th best finish in the City of Chicago.

== Notable people ==
- Dayvon Daquan "King Von" Bennett (1994–2020), rapper and songwriter. He was a resident of Parkway Gardens.
- Gwendolyn Brooks (1917–2000), poet, author, and teacher who won the 1950 Pulitzer Prize for Poetry for Annie Allen. She resided at 7428 South Evans Avenue from 1953 until 1994.
- Al Capone (1899–1947), Capone purchased a residence at 7244 South Prairie Avenue in 1923, but shortly after moved to Cicero, Illinois.
- Chief Keef, rapper and record producer, he was a resident of Parkway Gardens.
- Gary Comer (1927–2006), businessman and philanthropist who founded Lands' End. He was a childhood resident of Grand Crossing.
- Robert Cooley (born 1943), Mafia attorney turned government informant and author of When Corruption Was King. He was a childhood resident raised at 74th & Vernon.
- Shani Davis (born 1982), first African American athlete to win a gold medal in an individual event at the Olympic Winter Games. He lived in Greater Grand Crossing until the age of 6 when his family moved to Rogers Park.
- George Freeman. (1927—2025), jazz guitarist. He was born and raised in and returned between stints elsewhere to the Greater Grand Crossing neighborhood in Chicago.
- Wilton Daniel Gregory (born 1947), prelate of the Catholic Church and the first African-American cardinal. He was raised at 217 West 72nd Street.
- Jennifer Hudson (born 1981), singer and actress. She was a childhood resident of Greater Grand Crossing.
- Albert "Sunnyland Slim" Luandrew (1906–1995), blues pianist credited with making Chicago a center of the genre after World War II. He resided for a time at 368 East 69th Street in the 1970s.
- Michelle Obama (born 1964), 51st First Lady of the United States (2009–2017). She was a childhood resident of the Parkway Garden Homes. The family moved to South Shore when she was two years old.
- Leroy Orange (born 1950), victim of police torture and one of four recipients of a pardon at the start of George Ryan's large-scale death penalty moratorium. He resided at 803 East 75th Street at the time of his conviction.
- Craig Robinson (born 1962), college basketball coach, basketball executive, and broadcaster. The brother of Michelle Obama, he was a childhood resident of Parkway Garden Homes. The family moved to South Shore when he was four years old.

== Features ==
The Oak Woods Cemetery, established in 1854, is located in Greater Grand Crossing.

Since 2006, Artist Theaster Gates has redeveloped several buildings in Grand Crossing as art and community centers.

The community has since been redeveloped in slow progression.
