= Judge Maloney =

Judge Maloney may refer to:

- Paul Lewis Maloney (born 1949), judge of the United States District Court for the Western District of Michigan
- Robert B. Maloney (born 1933), judge of the United States District Court for the Northern District of Texas
- Thomas J. Maloney (judge) (1925–2008), judge in Cook County, Illinois

== See also ==
- Anthony William Maloney (1928–2004), justice of the Supreme Court of Ontario and husband of Marian Maloney
