= Michael J. Corbitt =

American police officer and mobster (1944–2004)

- Born: Michael Jerome Corbitt; March 17, 1944
- Died: July 27, 2004 (aged 60); Tampa, Florida, U.S.
- Known for: Willow Springs Police Chief turned Chicago Outfit associate
- Status: Released (1998)
- Convictions: Conspiracy to commit murder; Extortion (3 counts); Racketeering (3 counts)

Details
- Date: 1982 (murder of Masters); 1973–1982 (racketeering period)
- Country: United States
- State: Illinois
- Date apprehended: May 20, 1987
- Imprisoned at: 1988–1998
- Police career
- Department: Willow Springs Police Department
- Service years: 1973–1982
- Rank: Police Chief

Michael Jerome Corbitt (March 17, 1944 – July 27, 2004) was a police chief of Willow Springs, Illinois from 1973 until 1982, and an associate of Chicago Outfit mobsters such as Sal Bastone, Sam "Momo" Giancana and Antonino "Tony," "Joe Batters" Accardo. He became a cooperating witness after being convicted of aiding in the murder of Chicagoan Dianne Masters, by her husband, Alan. Corbitt authored a book about his experiences entitled, Double Deal: The Cop Who Was a Mobster.

== Life ==
Michael Corbitt was born to an Irish American family in Chicago, Illinois. After several years in a Roman Catholic parochial school, he was transferred to public school at age 9. He would later recall that, without a Catholic school uniform to hide behind, it was obvious just how poor his family was. Humiliated by the poverty of his parents and tired of hand-me-down toys and clothing, he turned to shoplifting and later graduated to running with an Italian-American street gang.

In always hanging around where Corbitt could be seen by Mob members, he soon drew the attention of the Chicago Outfit, who recruited him into running errands around one of its social clubs. After several years of owning and running a Sunoco gas station set up by the Mob, which also doubled as a mobster hang out, Outfit boss Sam Giancana then offered Corbitt a position as a police officer in Willow Springs, Illinois. According to Corbitt's memoirs, Giancana told him after he accepted the position, "But just remember kid...don't forget who your friends are." Shortly thereafter, Corbitt was sworn into the Willow Springs police department by notorious political boss Doc Rust.

On May 20, 1987, Corbitt was indicted in the Northern District of Illinois on three counts of extortion and racketeering, in violation of 18 U.S.C. sections 1951 and 1962(c) and (d). The indictment alleged that, during his tenure as Chief of Police, Corbitt accepted bribes in exchange for permitting various criminal enterprises to operate with impunity, and that he extorted payments from businesses in Willow Springs and elsewhere. Corbitt pled guilty to all three counts; he was sentenced on January 11, 1988 to four years on each count, the sentences to run concurrently.

In 1989 Corbett was convicted of conspiracy in plotting the death of Dianne Masters, the wife of Alan Masters, an attorney with ties to the Chicago mafia. Corbett received a sentence of 20 years. He was released from prison in 1998, two years early, after helping the FBI solve several mob-related crimes.

== Death ==
Michael J. Corbitt died in Tampa, Florida from lung cancer, at age 60, in 2004.

== Sources ==
- Cooley, Robert and Hillel Levin. When Corruption Was King: How I Helped the Mob Rule Chicago, Then Brought the Outfit Down. New York: Caroll & graf Publishers, 2004. ISBN 0-7867-1583-9
- Corbitt, Michael and Sam Giancana. Double Deal: The Inside Story of Murder, Unbridled Corruption, and the Cop Who Was a Mobster. New York: HarperCollins Publishing, 2003. ISBN 0-06-103048-1
