= United States Organized Crime Strike Force =

Created in the 1960s led by Senator Robert F. Kennedy

Strike Forces

Agency overview
- Formed: 1966

Jurisdictional structure
- Operations jurisdiction: United States

Operational structure
- Agency executive: Deputy Assistant Attorney General, Criminal Division
- Parent agency: Attorney General; Department of Justice; Criminal Division; Organized Crime and Racketeering Section (Until 1989); Violent Crime and Racketeering Section (After 2010)

Notables
- Person: Ramsey Clark (Creator); Robert F. Kennedy (Creator)

The United States Organized Crime Strike Force (Strike Forces) is a program of the United States Department of Justice Criminal Division empowering individual and coordinated units based in American cities across the country to pursue illegal racketeering by organized crime syndicates, including the Mafia, the Irish mob, the Russian mafia, and other gangs. The Strike Forces have largely been eliminated since Attorney General Dick Thornburgh in 1989 merged the Strike Forces with the AUSAs, in what was called the "slow death" of the effort against organized crime. Other Strike Forces have been merged with the Strike Forces of the Organized Crime Drug Enforcement Task Force (OCDETF), losing the focus of racketeering to focus on narcotics.

Thomas J. McKeon wrote an article in the journal of the American Bar Association in which he wrote the following:

"Simply stated, a "strike force" is an integrated investigation and prosecution program with collocated attorneys and investigators. A strike force emphasizes the pooling of criminal intelligence data among investigative agencies and stresses the vigorous prosecution of indictments returned by a specially empaneled federal grand Jury."

== Current Strike Forces ==
As of 2019, Brigid Martin was the Chief of the Northern California Strike Force. Karen Kreuzkamp was the Deputy Chief.

== History and mission ==
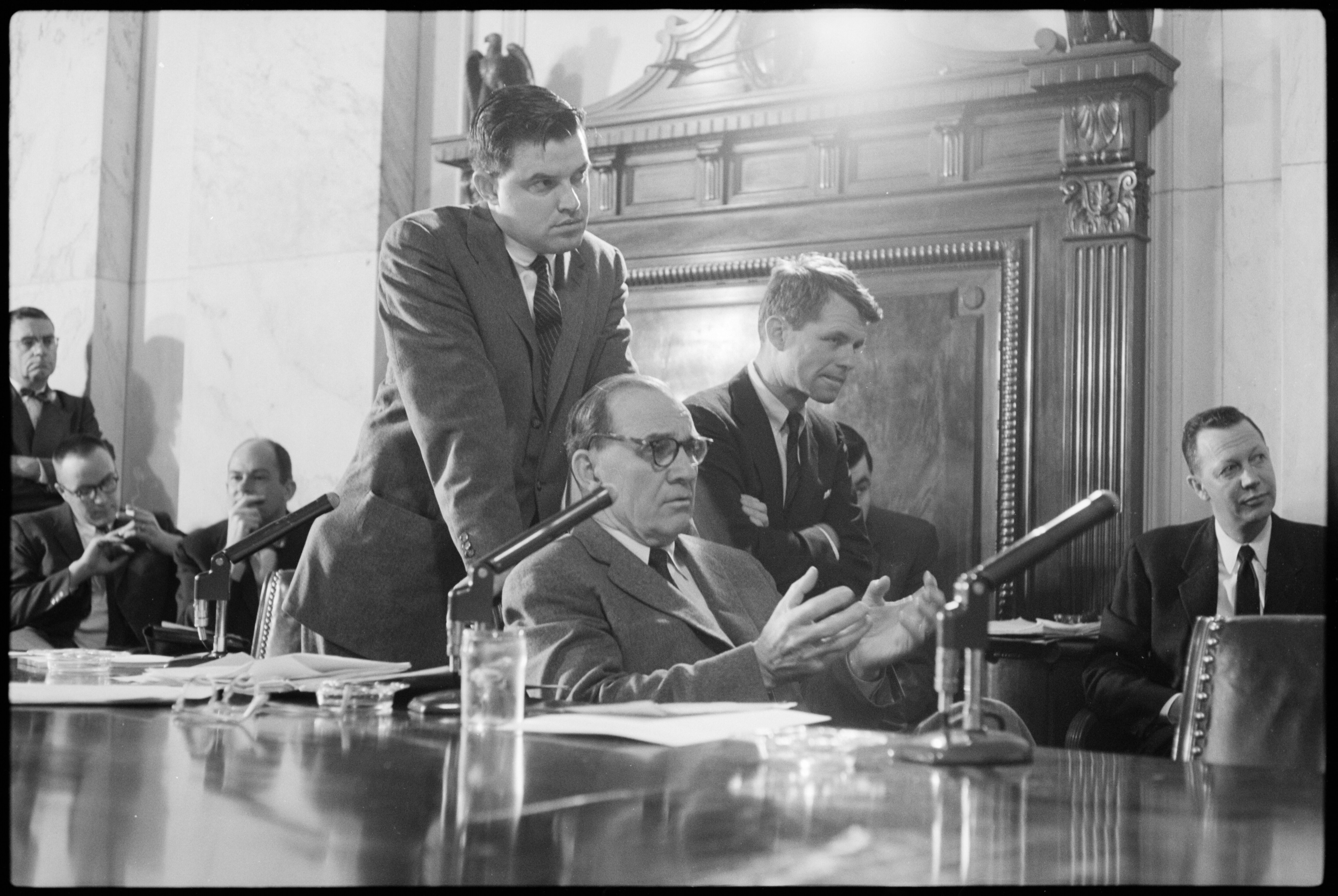
Robert F. Kennedy and the Senate Rackets Committee

=== Creation of the Strike Forces (1966) ===
The Strike Forces were created in the late 1960s for the purpose of finding and prosecuting illegal racketeering. They were formed in a congressional effort led by Senator Robert F. Kennedy.

Specifically, the Strike Forces were directed toward the identification and investigation of taxpayers and labor officials who derived substantial income from organized criminal activities. The coordination of enforcement efforts and close cooperation and liaison with other federal, state, and local enforcement agencies are necessary for effective Strike Force operations.

Many of the early investigations conducted by the Strike Forces, particularly those involving labor racketeering, were led by the Department of Labor Office of Organized Crime and Racketeering. Since 1966, the Labor Department had been investigating the connection between organized crime and organized labor as part of a Justice Department task force. Under Senate pressure the department created a separate office and put it under the inspector general's control.

From 1978 to 1984, the office brought 95 cases against alleged mobsters and union racketeers, securing 201 convictions and 55 acquittals.

=== Attorney General forces consolidation (1989) ===
In 1989, Attorney General Dick Thornburgh presented a proposal to the Director to begin the process of merging and consolidating certain efforts of the Criminal Division, including the Strike Forces. Following this, the Senate Governmental Affairs Committee, chaired by Senator Joseph Biden, held a joint hearing on organized crime to look into the question of consolidating the Strike Forces with the offices of the United States Attorneys and Assistant United States Attorneys around the country. The primary problems noted by Senators Strom Thurmond and Ted Kennedy were the fact that the Strike Forces were not equipped to investigate enterprises of drugs or narcotics trafficking, and that rivalries existed between the Attorneys General and the Strike Forces in certain cities where they were investigating the same criminal networks.

Chairman Sam Nunn, of the Governmental Affairs Subcommittee on Investigations, said to the joint hearing:

"I must say that this litany of success in the strike forces, and in particularly in the last few years, causes me to wonder why the Attorney General wants to change what his own department only a little more than a year ago told us was a very successful program?"

Biden's hearings resulted in a formal request to delay the merger for further review, but on December 26, 1989, U.S. Attorney General Order 1386-89 was signed by Attorney General Thornburgh, and the Strike Forces were merged with the AUSAs. The name "Strike Forces" at this time was changed to Organized Crime Strike Force Units (OCFSU). Within the next six months, over 25% of the organized crime prosecutors in the Department of Justice tendered their resignations. Further resignations followed.

One of the biggest voices in opposition to merging racketeering efforts with narcotics and drugs efforts would be that the focus on racketeering would be entirely lost, and that racketeering prosecutions would begin to dry up in favor of drugs and narcotics.

=== Strike Forces largely disappear ===
With the Strike Forces coming under the leadership of the United States Attorneys, the model of Strike Forces started to disappear. The Strike Forces had been overseen by prosecutors who were dedicated to the mission and vocation of eliminating organized crime and racketeering, and in contrast, the average US Attorney only held the position for roughly four years. The prediction at the time would be that within the next three years, the Strike Forces would "atrophy." This prediction largely came true - the Strike Forces were allowed to operate independently for some time, but they were not given priority by their AUSAs.

Around 2000, the federal Strike Forces were largely disbanded in favor of state or local efforts. However, during its time, the organizations were jointly responsible for the successful investigation and conviction of high-ranking Mafiosos such as Joseph Aiuppa of the Chicago Outfit, Anthony Salerno of the Genovese Family of New York and Paul Castellano of the Gambino Family, in addition to removing large amounts of corruption from The Teamsters.

Moreover, though no longer proceeding in a formal strike force, agencies such as the Department of Labor Office of the Inspector General (OIG) continued to pursue labor racketeering and organized crime investigations.

From October 2003 through September 2004, the OIG's labor racketeering program had 130 open cases involving organized crime groups. In addition, during this time frame, its racketeering investigations resulted in over $36.5 million in monetary accomplishments, including restitutions and forfeitures, plus 260 indictments and 143 convictions.

=== Restructure of the OCRS into the VCRS (2010) ===
In 2010, the Organized Crime and Racketeering Section (OCRS) was merged with the National Gang Targeting Enforcement and Coordination Center (GangTECC), and the Gang Unit to become the Violent Crime and Racketeering Section (VCRS).

As of 2011, the VCRS had the responsibility to ensure that OCSFU cases are prosecuted.

== Strike Forces history ==
=== Buffalo Strike Force (1966–1968) ===
In 1966, the first Strike Force of the Organized Crime and Racketeering Section (OCRS) was established in Buffalo, New York, and was known as the Buffalo Strike Force. The Buffalo Strike Force coordinated the efforts of the OCRS and federal law enforcement agencies. More than 30 people were on this team, under the direction of Bob Peloquin. This team was composed of members from the Bureau of Customs, the Internal Revenue Service, the Bureau of Narcotics and Dangerous Drugs, the Bureau of Alcohol, Tobacco, Firearms and Explosives, the Royal Canadian Mounted Police, and others.

The team jointly;

- Identified the power structure of organized crime in Buffalo.
- Targeted individuals based on gathered intelligence.
- Initiated prosecutions against criminal organizations.

The Buffalo Strike Force was dissolved in November 1968.

The Buffalo Police Department announced in 2018 that they were considering bringing back the Buffalo Strike Force.

=== Detroit Strike Force ===
After the success of Bob Peloquin and the Buffalo Strike Force, the Detroit Strike Force was the second Strike Force established in the United States. In 1968 and 1968, Thomas J. McKeon was the first Detroit Strike Force Chief. The Detroit Strike force had representatives from eight federal investigative agencies, three state agencies, and the Royal Canadian Mounted Police. The FBI provided 75% of the total intelligence available to the Strike Force, but they did not assign a full-time employee to the Detroit Strike Force. Detroit targeted members of La Cosa Nostra (LCN) and their criminal associates, labor union officers connected with LCN, and corrupt members of the government.

In the 1970's, the Detroit Strike Force investigated the disappearance of Jimmy Hoffa.

=== Newark Strike Force ===
After the 1967 Newark riots, Attorney General John N. Mitchell created the Newark, New Jersey Strike Force. Mitchell appointed John R. Bartels Jr. to run it. While running this unit, Bartels coordinated the activities of ten federal agencies and local law enforcement. Bartels performed investigations, interviewed suspects, worked alongside federal agents, and arranged for witness protection. Bartels was directly responsible for "the most significant attack on organized crime in the state’s history." People that Bartels helped to indict include Hugh Addonizio, Thomas J. Whelan, John V. Kenny, corrupt cops, and corrupt politicians. The Sub Office of the Newark Strike Force was in Camden, New Jersey. Bartels left this position in 1973 to become the Acting Administrator for the Drug Enforcement Administration.

=== Chicago Strike Force ===
Former Chiefs of the Chicago Strike Force include Gary S. Shapiro, Dave Shippers, and Peter Vaira.

When Sam Giancana was killed, Chief Vaira commented to the Los Angeles Times: “It looks like a private thing, like he’s done something to somebody. I don’t think it’s because of his grand jury testimony.”

In 1970, the Chicago Strike Force began a three-year investigation of police corruption in Chicago. The results included the conviction of "scores of officers." More than 60 officers in the Chicago Police Department were sent to prison.

In 1980, Mitchell Mars joined the Chicago Strike Force, and was the last Acting Chief of the Chicago Strike Force before the unit was merged with the AUSA's office in 1989.

=== Boston Strike Force ===
The Boston Strike Force was involved in the hunt for Whitey Bulger under its former Strike Force Chief Jeremiah O'Sullivan.

=== Brooklyn Strike Force ===
A former Chief of the Brooklyn Strike Force was Barbara Jones.

=== Cleveland Strike Force ===
The Cleveland Strike Force, which was a joint-operation between the Departments of Justice and Labor, faced a setback in the prosecution of Jackie Presser, the President of the Teamsters. It was revealed that the FBI, which had not been involved in the Cleveland Strike Force, had made Presser a confidential informant. Presser's lawyers argued during the Jackie Presser indictment scandal, that the FBI had allowed Presser to commit violent acts in the pursuit of their investigation. The Department of Labor also alleged wrongdoing in this case on the part of Department of Justice officials.

=== Kansas City Strike Force ===
In 1986, David Helfrey, chief of the Kansas City Strike Force, spearheaded the prosecution of several Midwestern Mafia bosses accused of skimming from the Stardust and Fremont casinos. This case was the inspiration for the movie Casino.

=== Las Vegas Strike Force ===
The Las Vegas Strike Force prosecuted against the mafia in the 70's and 80's, which have been called the "mobster era of Las Vegas." The Las Vegas Strike force successfully drove the mob out of Las Vegas. One member of the Strike Force here was Stan Hunterton.

The Chief of the Las Vegas Strike force was Geoffrey Anderson. Anderson and the Strike Force developed a feud with judges Harry Claiborne and Roger D. Foley after the judges had ordered casinos reopened that were in the process of being shut down. The judges accused the Strike Force of misconduct after it was discovered that the prosecutors had satirical cartoons of the judges displayed in their offices. Judge Foley convened a Federal grand jury to complain about Anderson and his suspicions that Anderson wanted Foley removed from office.

=== Los Angeles Strike Force ===
The Los Angeles Strike Force was created in 1970.

=== Miami Strike Force ===
In 1978, the Miami Strike Force indicted Anthony Accetturo and several of his gang members for extortion. However, the Chief of the Miami Strike Force misplaced the key witness in the case, and was replaced by Mark Tuohey. The witness, William Stone, was recovered in Hawaii by the FBI, but not before Special Agent Ben Grogan was killed in a Miami parking lot.

=== New Orleans Strike Force ===
When Keith "Big Daddy" Gisleson was 27 years old, he was made the Chief of the New Orleans Strike Force. The New Orleans Strike Force took on the case of Carlos Marcello, who was arrested by FBI agent Patrick O'Connor.

The New Orleans Strike Force directed Operation BRILAB.

=== Philadelphia Strike Force ===
The Philadelphia Strike Force, established in the 1970's, was responsible largely for the dismantling of the Philadelphia crime family in South Philadelphia in its day. The Philadelphia Strike Force was dissolved in 2008, when it was merged into a drugs and gangs unit.

== See also ==
- Strike Force Model
