= South Park Manor Historic District =

- U.S. National Register of Historic Places
- U.S. Historic district
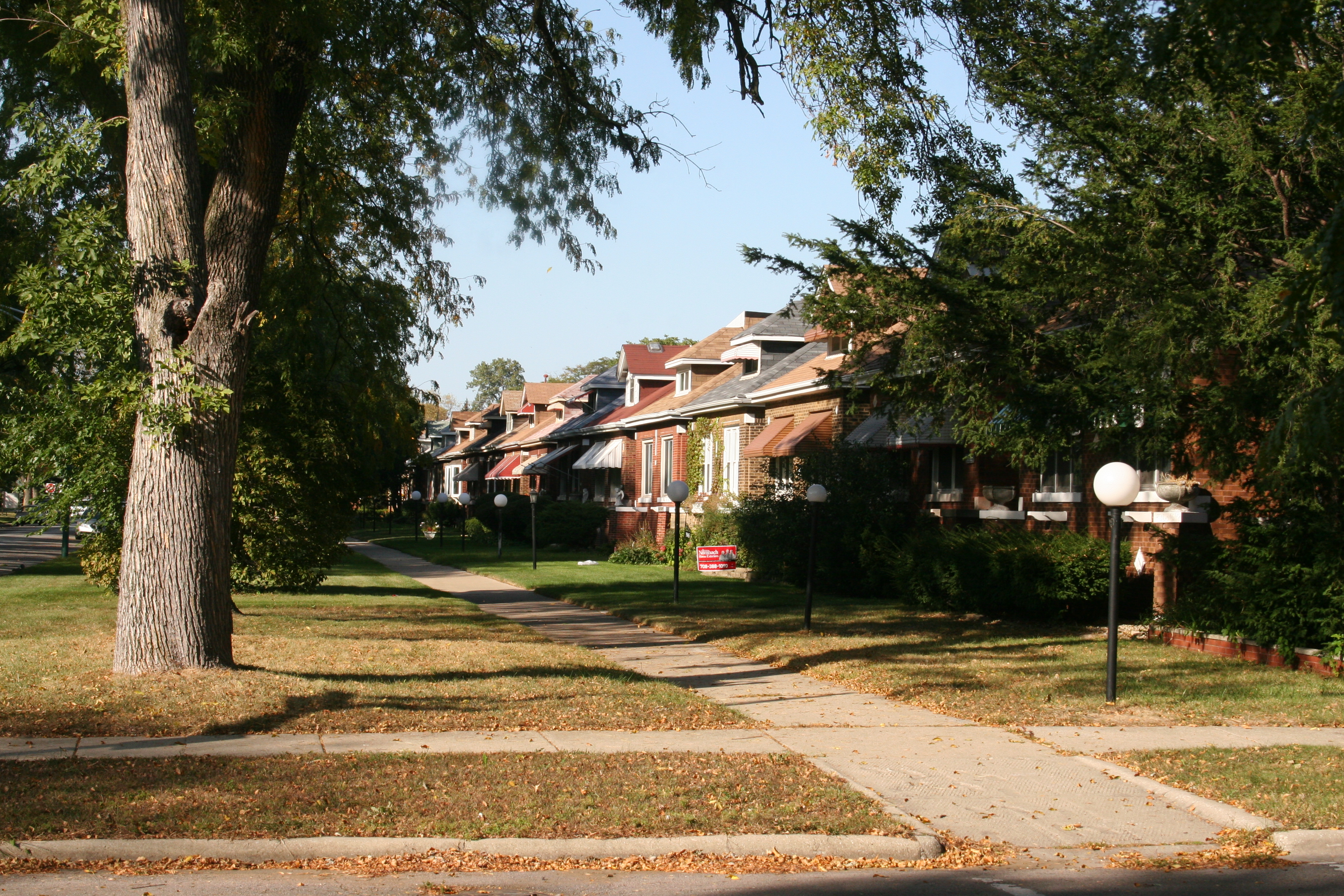

- Location within Chicago metropolitan area Location within Illinois Location within the United States
- Location: Roughly bounded by S. King Dr., S. State St., 75th St. and 79th St., Chicago, Illinois
- Coordinates: 41°45′25″N 87°37′09″W
- Area: 144 acres (58 ha)
- Architectural style: Chicago Bungalow
- MPS: Chicago Bungalows MPS
- NRHP reference No.: 04000076
- Added to NRHP: February 25, 2004

The South Park Manor Historic District is a residential historic district in the Greater Grand Crossing neighborhood of Chicago, Illinois. The district includes 263 Chicago bungalows built between 1915 and 1927. At the time, single-family homeownership was becoming broadly accessible to Chicagoans, and the bungalow was a popular choice for dense urban housing. The bungalows in the district were designed by several developers, but the district has a consistent appearance nonetheless. The use of a single home type throughout provided uniformity to the neighborhood, while stylistic variations such as the placement of dormers and porches gave each house its own character. The developers also gave their homes spacious lawns and private backyards to preserve green space in an urban setting.

The district was added to the National Register of Historic Places on February 25, 2004.
