= Operation Greylord =

Federal investigation of corruption in the judiciary of Cook County, Illinois

Operation Greylord was an investigation conducted jointly by the Federal Bureau of Investigation (FBI), the IRS Criminal Investigation Division, the U.S. Postal Inspection Service, the Chicago Police Department Internal Affairs Division and the Illinois State Police into corruption in the judiciary of Cook County, Illinois (the Chicago jurisdiction). The FBI named the investigation "Operation Greylord" after a racehorse, after other suggested names were rejected by FBI Headquarters as being too close to the subject matter of the investigation, should they become known.

== Operation ==
The 3-year, 8-month federal undercover operation took place in the 1980s, with the cooperation of some state and local law enforcement and judicial officials. After the end of the undercover phase, the Greylord trials lasted ten years. Over 92 public officials were indicted (almost all in federal court), and most eventually were convicted, either by guilty pleas or trials.

The undercover phase included a Cook County Assistant State's Attorney, as well as numerous FBI agents and cooperating local law enforcement officers. Cook County Judge Thaddeus Kowalski also cooperated with authorities even though he knew his cooperation might endanger his career. Recently elected downstate Judge Brocton Lockwood operated undercover in the Chicago Traffic Court. In addition, Assistant State's Attorney Terrence Hake went undercover in the Criminal Division of the Cook County Circuit Court, initially as a prosecutor and later as a defense attorney (although actually on the FBI payroll).

=== Investigators ===
Key undercover FBI agents and lawyers included: David Grossman, David Ries and Hake. As a Cook County prosecutor, Hake complained about the bribery and corruption in the Murder and Sexual Assault preliminary hearing courtroom in Chicago. The FBI and United States Attorney's Office learned of Hake's complaint and recruited him to pose as a corrupt prosecutor and later as a bribe-paying criminal defense attorney. Lamar Jordan, David Benscoter, Marie Dyson, William C. Megary, and Robert Farmer were the principal FBI case agents and supervisors during the investigation. Six Internal Revenue Service agents also played key roles in tracking the money flows, including Dennis Czurylo and Bill Thullen.

=== Prosecutors ===
During the next decade, four United States Attorneys—Thomas P. Sullivan, Dan K. Webb, Anton R. Valukas and Fred Foreman—supervised the investigations and prosecutions. First Assistant United States Attorney Daniel Reidy and Assistant United States Attorneys (AUSA) Charles Sklarsky, Scott Lassar, Scott Mendeloff and Candace J. Fabri led many of the prosecutions. In 1985, Valukus and AUSA James Schweitzer indicted 22 corrupt court personnel, including Judge Raymond Sodini, who presided over the corruption in his courtroom at Chicago Police Headquarters.

The first listening device ever placed in a judge's chambers in the United States occurred in the undercover phase, when after hearing tapes recorded by undercover agent/prosecutor Hake, a federal judge found evidentiary probable cause and allowed the FBI to bug the narcotics court chambers of Judge Wayne Olson. Olson was one of those later convicted of corruption. In order to acquire evidence of corruption, agents obtained judicial and U.S. Department of Justice authorization to present staged court cases for the undercover agents/lawyers to fix in front of the corrupt judges. In August 1983, the undercover investigative phase ended, when a corrupt court clerk and a corrupt Chicago Police officer were approached by the FBI to cooperate in the investigation and they leaked the investigation to the media.

=== Indictment and trial ===
The first defendant to be found guilty was Harold Conn, Deputy Traffic Court Clerk in the Cook County judicial system. Conn was convicted in March 1984 and was one of the many bagmen in the ring of corruption. The last conviction was that of Judge Thomas J. Maloney, who was indicted on bribery charges. Maloney was convicted and then sentenced in 1994 to 16 years for fixing three murder cases for more than $100,000 in bribes. Maloney was released from federal prison in 2008, and died the same year.

A total of 93 people were indicted, including 17 judges, 48 lawyers and prosecutors, 10 deputy sheriffs, eight policemen, eight court officials, and state representative James DeLeo. Of the 17 judges indicted, 15 were convicted. One supervising judge, Richard LeFevour, was convicted on 59 counts of mail fraud, racketeering and income-tax violations, and was later sentenced to 12 years in prison, as well as being disbarred. The stiffest sentence was received by former Circuit Judge Reginald Holzer, who received an 18-year sentence for accepting over $200,000 in bribes from multiple attorneys. Judge Holzer was prosecuted by Assistant United States Attorney Scott Turow, who later became an acclaimed novelist. DeLeo pleaded guilty to a misdemeanor and was sentenced to probation, and was later elected to the Illinois Senate. Three subjects of the investigation committed suicide, including former Circuit Judge Allen Rosin. Rosin was taking bribes in divorce court in child custody cases and spousal property disputes.

== Aftermath ==
The systemic corruption led to the formation of the Special Commission on the Administration of Justice in Cook County, a group assembled in August 1984 to examine the problems of the Cook County courts. The group also issued recommendations that were designed to contribute to a period of reform in the courts. The commission, led by Jenner & Block attorney Jerold Solovy, wrote a total of 165 recommendations for the courts of Cook County. Questions remain as to whether those changes achieved the cleanup which many citizens and advocates for better government desired.

Operation Greylord also led to several similar investigations targeting corruption in Cook County, including Operations Silver Shovel, Incubator, Lantern, Gambat, and Safebet. Operation Greylord also became known for its use of eavesdropping devices in order to obtain evidence for trial.

Most of the prosecutors have since left government service and joined large law firms, including Jenner & Block. One, Candace J. Fabri, became a judge in Cook County in 2006, and was recently rated "Well Qualified" by a local attorneys' group; only a former public defender received a higher rating.

Circuit Judge Thomas R. Fitzgerald, who cleaned up Traffic Court after the Greylord investigation, was elected to the Illinois Supreme Court, from which he retired in 2010.

In 2009, an attorney for some of those convicted in the Greylord investigation requested that Governor Pat Quinn issue mass pardons, calling her clients rather than the taxpayers the real victims, but the governor did not grant that request before he was defeated for re-election in 2014. In 2010 and 2014, respectively, two attorneys disbarred for unethical conduct disclosed in the Greylord investigation sought to regain their respective law licenses, but were denied; another attorney withdrew a similar application in 2003.

In July 2016, Terrence Hake went on the Chicago talk radio program "Legal Eagles" to explain his role in Operation Greylord and the operation's aftermath. "Legal Eagles" was hosted by retired police officer William Pelarenos and broadcast on WCGO 1590AM.

== See also ==
- In re Himmel
