= Frank J. Wilson (judge) =

American judge

Frank J. Wilson (died February 1990) was an American judge who served on the Cook County Circuit Court in Illinois. He is most notable for presiding in the murder trial of Chicago mobster Harry Aleman, the only person in U.S. history to be tried a second time for the same crime by the same government after being acquitted: the courts ruled that because Aleman had bribed Judge Wilson, he had never truly been in jeopardy and thus could be retried without violating constitutional protections against double jeopardy.

Judge Wilson killed himself after the bribery scheme was revealed.
