= Robert D. Peloquin =

American lawyer and private intelligence director (1929-2011)

Bob Peloquin
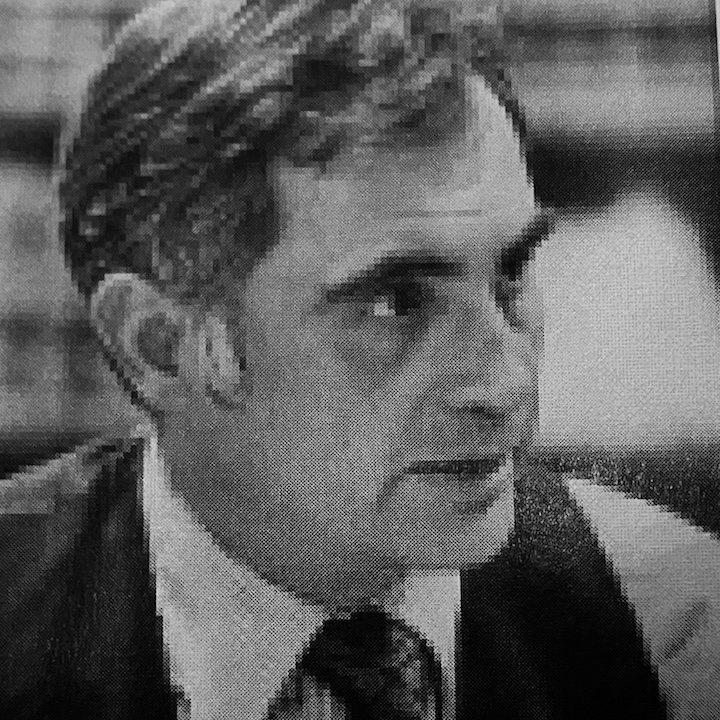

1st Chief of the Buffalo Strike Force
- In office 1966–1968

Chief of the United States Organized Crime Strike Force

Founder and President of INTERTEL
- In office 1970–1990

Personal details
- Born: January 9, 1929 Fall River, Massachusetts
- Died: March 24, 2011 (aged 82)
- Spouse: Margaret Sheridan Peloquin
- Education: Georgetown University
- Awards: Attorney General's Outstanding Performance Award
- Nickname: The Needle

Military service
- Branch/service: United States Navy; United States Naval Reserves
- Rank: Commander
- Battles/wars: Korean War

Robert "Bob" Dolan Peloquin was an American trial lawyer, private intelligence agency director, federal investigator, and pioneer of American law enforcement. He was the first Strike Force Chief in the United States, managing the Buffalo Strike Force. His Strike Force Model used at the Buffalo Strike Force would be replicated in over twenty cities for the next 30 years in the American law enforcement fight against organized crime and racketeering. Peloquin later became the co-founder and President of INTERTEL, a private intelligence agency that was comparable in its investigative function to the abilities of the FBI.

He earned the nickname "The Needle," when one of his crucial witnesses ripped their pants just before testifying, and Peloquin was able to sew the pants together with a needle and thread before the witness took the stand. It is not known where Peloquin acquired the needle or the thread.

== Early life ==
Peloquin grew up in Fall River, Massachusetts, the son of a grocery store owner. In 1948, while studying as a student at Georgetown University, Peloquin met his wife Margaret, who was a student at Dunbarton College of the Holy Cross.

In 1951, Peloquin graduated from Georgetown with a bachelor's degree. With his degree, he commissioned as an officer in the United States Navy. He served in the Navy as a Naval Intelligence officer during the Korean War. In 1955, after the war, Peloquin left active service but remained in the United States Navy Reserve.

In 1956, Peloquin graduated from Georgetown University Law Center.

== Career in the Department of Justice ==
In 1957, Peloquin joined the Department of Justice as a trial lawyer. While here, he investigated the 1964 murders of Andrew Goodman, Michael Schwerner, and James Chaney in Mississippi. He investigated mafia control of casinos in The Bahamas. He was also on the Get Hoffa Squad, the squad of top federal investigators and lawyers organized by Bobby Kennedy to pursue Jimmy Hoffa.

=== Buffalo Strike Force ===
In 1966, Peloquin ran the first Strike Force in the United States. The United States Organized Crime Strike Force was first created as the "Buffalo Project," and operated as the first "field force," of the OCRS in Buffalo, New York, and would later be known as the Buffalo Strike Force. The Buffalo Strike Force coordinated the efforts of the OCRS and federal law enforcement agencies. More than 30 people were on this team. While Chief of the Buffalo Strike Force, Peloquin investigated and prosecuted against the Magaddino and Profaci Mafia families.

By 1989, inspired by Peloquin's successes in Buffalo, there were 14 Strike Forces across the country operating as independent prosecutorial and investigative teams coordinated against organized crime. The Strike Forces were expanded after this first experiment for the purpose of finding and prosecuting illegal racketeering.

Peloquin left the Department of Justice in 1968 to go into the private sector.

== Entry into private practice ==
Peloquin went to work with of William G. Hundley to form the law firm "Hundley and Peloquin," where Peloquin acted as Associate Council to the National Football League, and advised it on security practices. Hundley and Peloquin were hired by Pete Rozelle to organize grounds security and analyze internal security. It was at this time that the two men were hired by Resorts International in order to purge the mafia from their casinos in the Bahamas.

== Intertel ==
In 1970, Hundley and Peloquin created the private intelligence agency called INTERTEL (Intelligence International Inc.), bringing the NFL with them as a client. INTERTEL would perform background checks on new players, referees, prospective club owners, and more.

However, Hundley's ambition was not as large as Peloquin's. In an interview with the Washington Post, Hundley said: "I don't think Rob will ever be satisfied just being a lawyer. There's too much gunshots in him looking for the big challenge; I wanted to practice law. So we went our own ways."

In 1985, the majority of shares in INTERTEL was purchased by Resorts International, and Peloquin became a vice president in the company. INTERTEL had a staff of 50 private detectives - most of them former FBI, CIA, and IRS investigators.

Peloquin told the Washington Post: "It's not really that much of a change to come here from the FBI or the IRS. INTERTEL is basically a collection of people who have succeeded reasonably well in government and have a desire for a second career. I get em cheap. I capitalize on government training."

Peloquin's client list at INTERTEL included;

- Howard Hughes
- ITT Inc.
- Mohammad Reza Shah.
- The Monarchy of Spain
- Detroit Airport
- Rhode Island Department of Corrections
- The London Daily Mail
- New Jersey State Commission of Investigation

Some of INTERTEL's employees were involved with the Watergate scandal, and the investigative reporter Les Whitten claims that INTERTEL was hired to spy on Jack Anderson after he published leaked documents from the Nixon campaign. Peloquin disputed the claim made by Les.

In 1990, he retired from the company as Chairman of the Bahamas branch of Resorts International.

== Retirement and later life ==
In 1981, Peloquin retired from the Navy Reserves with the rank of Commander.

In 1990, he moved to Plantation, Florida.

He was a member of the Knights of Columbus and the Catholic Shrine of the Most Blessed Sacrament in Washington, D.C.
