= Grand Crossing rail collision =

1853 train collision in Chicago

Grand Crossing Rail Collision
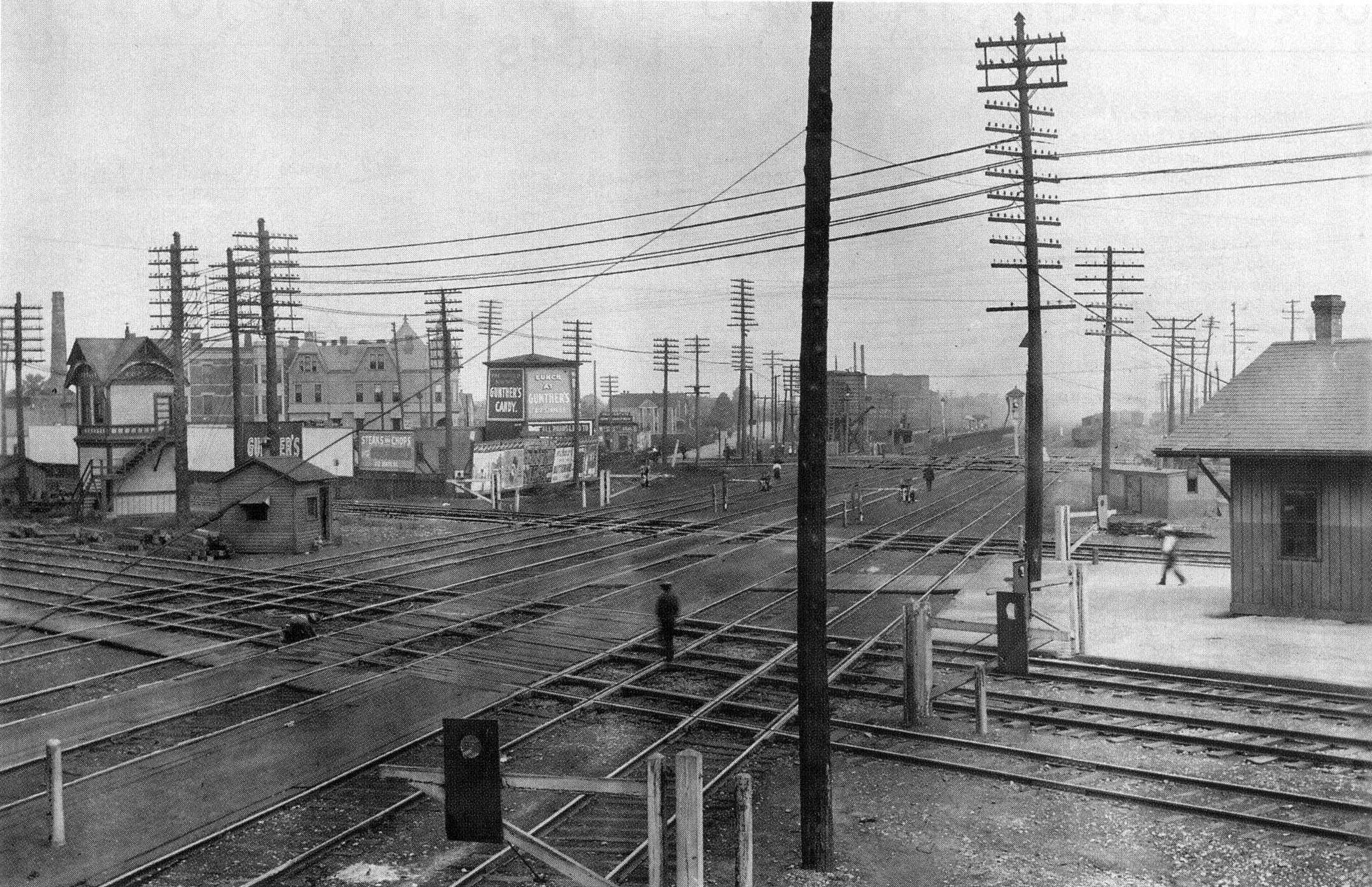
- Site of the accident, 1902

Details
- Date: April 26, 1853; 173 years ago 10:00 p.m.
- Location: Greater Grand Crossing, Chicago
- Coordinates: 41.758694°N 87.59575°W
- Incident type: Collision
- Cause: Poor visibility, lack of signal

Statistics
- Trains: 2
- Deaths: 18–21
- Injured: 40–60

The Grand Crossing Rail Collision was a train collision that occurred in Greater Grand Crossing, Chicago in 1853.

== Background ==
At the time of the accident, Greater Grand Crossing, Chicago was an undeveloped marshland far from any large population sites. The location's sole claim to importance was the intersection of two major intercity railroads: the Lake Shore and Michigan Southern Railway, running roughly east-west; and the Illinois Central Railroad, running roughly north-south. (The Pittsburgh, Fort Wayne and Chicago Railway, parallel to the Lake Shore Southern, would not arrive for another 5 years, and other railroads thereafter.) The Illinois Central tracks also hosted trains of the Michigan Central Railroad, which ran from Detroit to Kensington, Chicago, before using trackage rights to reach Great Central Depot in downtown Chicago.

Construction of the crossing had been contentious, and associated infrastructure remained incomplete. The crossing had no dedicated signals to ensure engineers had right of way before crossing. Instead train crews were expected to visually verify that the crossing was clear, with Illinois and Michigan Central trains having priority over conflicting Lake Shore Southern trains.

== Accident ==
The first train involved in the accident, a Lake Shore Southern express, was scheduled to depart Chicago at 9:00 pm for points east. On the night of April 25, 1853, it had been delayed by half an hour, to allow passengers from an inbound Chicago, Rock Island and Pacific Railroad train to connect.

The other train was an inbound Michigan Central mixed train running late by about seven hours. The locomotive lacked a functional headlamp, which the repair shop superintendent had instructed the engineer to ignore. Passengers on the mixed train were mainly new immigrants to the US, accommodated in emigrant cars towards the front.

Around 10:00 p.m., both trains reached the crossing. The night had been brightly lit by the moon, but there was a slight fog in the area. Thomas Backman, engineer on the Michigan Central train, assumed he had right-of-way and continued toward the crossing while slowing from 12 mph to 4 mph. Edward Davis, engineer on the Lake Shore Southern train, could not see the Michigan Central train until about 0.25 mi from the crossing. He whistled to signal that the train crew should apply brakes, but it was too late: his locomotive careened through the sixth car of the emigrant train at about 25 mph.

"In a moment the locomotive, tender, baggage car and one second class car of the express train, together with three emigrant cars of the Michigan Central train, were a heap of ruins." Survivors had injuries ranging from bruises to severed limbs. Victims were extricated from the wreck, but there was nowhere to put them, as the tracks were surrounded by water. One survivor described pulling an infant unscathed from the wreck; no mother had survived to claim it.

The locomotive of the emigrant train proceeded immediately to Great Central Depot, where they notified authorities of the collision. A special train carrying doctors and supplies arrived by midnight, and survivors began to be transported to the city around 2:30 am.

Meanwhile, passengers on the express had no idea that a serious collision had occurred.

The casualty count varies between sources, but most estimate 18-21 dead and another 40-60 injured.

== Aftermath ==
A grand jury investigation determined that both engineers and both conductors (Moses M. Tyler and Herbert I. Whitney) of the trains were all at fault. All four were convicted of gross negligence. The grand jury also censured the machine shop superintendent who disregarded changing out the headlamp as "unfit for the station he now occupies."

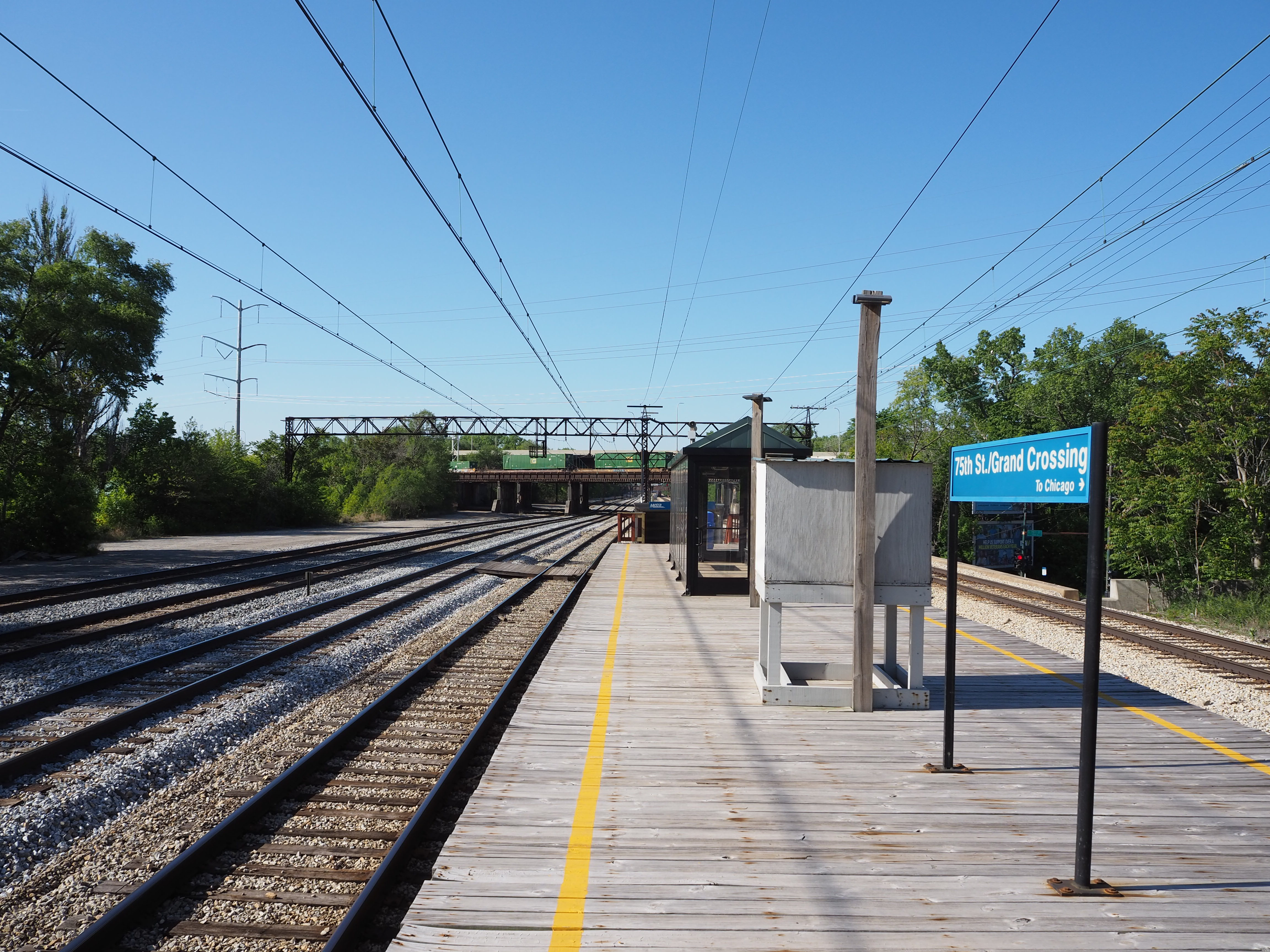
The site of the crash today

Following the accident, signals were finally added to the intersection. There would be no grade crossing separation until 1912. In the intervening time, trains were required to stop at the intersection before proceeding, which helped incentivize development in the area. The site of the accident is now roughly the intersection of 75th Street and South Chicago Avenue.
