= Harry Aleman =

American mobster (1939–2010)

- Mugshot
- Born: Harry Peralt Aleman; January 19, 1939; Chicago, Illinois, U.S.
- Died: May 15, 2010 (aged 71); Galesburg, Illinois, U.S.
- Other name: "The Hook"
- Allegiance: Chicago Outfit
- Convictions: Racketeering (1978); Murder (1997)
- Penalty: 30 years' imprisonment (1978); 300 years' imprisonment (1997)

Harry "The Hook" Aleman (January 19, 1939 – May 15, 2010) was a Chicago mobster who was one of the most feared enforcers for the Chicago Outfit during the 1970s. Aleman got the nickname "Hook" from his boxing career in high school. He is also famous for being the only person in the United States ever to be acquitted of murder, then legally tried and convicted for murder when the initial trial was found to be corrupt and therefore not considered a case of double jeopardy; the Chicago judge was recruited specifically to acquit Aleman during a bench trial.

== Early life ==
Born in the Taylor Street area of Chicago, Aleman was the first of three sons of Louis Aleman and Mary Virginia Baratta. The legendary Taylor Street was the port-of-call for Chicago's Italian Americans. Aleman was a nephew of future Chicago Outfit acting mob boss Joseph Ferriola and uncle to Joseph Aleman.

Aleman's mother was Italian, his father a native of Durango, Durango, Mexico who was involved in narcotics trafficking. In a 1997 interview, Aleman said that his father beat him every day. The only relief Aleman got was from ages seven to eleven, when Louis was in prison.

In 1956, Aleman graduated from Crane Technical High School and enrolled in the Chicago Academy of Fine Arts to study commercial art. In 1958, he graduated with a two-year degree in that field. Aleman went to work selling race track program sheets and produce from the South Water Street Market.

In 1964, Aleman married Ruth Felper Mustari, a widow with four children, who died in 2000 at age 68. Due to an accident as a teenager, Aleman was unable to produce children of his own. However, according to Ruth and his stepchildren, he was a loving and kind husband and father.

== Start of criminal career ==
In 1962, Aleman was charged with assaulting Howard Pierson, the 23-year-old son of a Chicago police commander. The incident started when Aleman, at a bar with his brother and friends, pushed a woman through a large window. Pierson chased Aleman out of the bar, then flagged down a police car. Police soon stopped Aleman and started questioning him. When Pierson arrived at the scene, the enraged Aleman punched Pierson, breaking his jaw. Aleman was convicted, but received only two years' probation.

During the 1960s, Aleman was also arrested for malicious mischief, illegal gambling, possession of burglary tools, assault, aggravated assault, grand theft auto, armed robbery, and aggravated kidnapping.

== Work as enforcer ==
In the early 1970s, Aleman decided to force independent bookmakers in Chicago to pay extortion payments, or "street tax", to the Outfit. If the bookmakers refused, Aleman was willing to use force on them.

According to law enforcement and the Chicago Crime Commission, Aleman committed 13 murders in Chicago between 1971 and 1976. His alleged victims included Richard Cain, a top aide to boss Sam Giancana, along with counterfeiters, mob informants, a security guard from a Miami museum that failed to pay his gambling debts, a former police officer, and another mob enforcer. Aleman was prosecuted for only one murder: the 1972 Logan killing. FBI agents were reported to have said that Aleman "oozed menace" and his mere presence was usually enough to enforce the Outfit's will.

=== Logan murder ===
On September 27, 1972, Aleman fatally shot Teamsters official William Logan in his Chicago neighborhood. Two witnesses watched Aleman commit the murder and prosecutors thought they had a strong case. According to prosecutors, the reason for Logan's murder was that the union man was obstructing Aleman's crew from hijacking trucks.

However, shortly before Aleman's trial started, Chicago attorney Robert Cooley was approached by First Ward political boss Pat Marcy and asked to take over as Aleman's lawyer. Although Cooley suggested that he could easily win an acquittal by discrediting the witnesses during cross-examination, Marcy insisted that the Chicago Outfit preferred a bench trial with a judge who could be bribed to acquit. Marcy warned Cooley that, if he accepted the job and failed to deliver, the Outfit would murder him. Thinking instantly of a close friend, Cook County Circuit Court Judge Frank J. Wilson, Cooley said he knew a judge whom no one would ever suspect.

After taking the case, Cooley "picked up information that was total dynamite. The hit, [Cooley] learned, had nothing to do with unions and all the other crap in the indictment. It was strictly personal. Billy Logan, the victim, had been married to Harry's cousin. They had a bitter divorce and argued constantly over custody of their son. Logan used to beat her up big time. The final straw came after one of the fights when she said, You better be careful, cause Harry won't be happy about it. And Logan replied, Fuck that guinea. He probably could have beaten her up a few more times and it wouldn't have mattered. But Harry wasn't going to let some Irish goon get away with calling him a guinea."

Meanwhile, Cooley approached Judge Wilson and offered him $10,000 to take over the case and acquit Harry Aleman. Wilson agreed, but later requested more money to compensate for the risk. As a result, Aleman was acquitted in a bench trial.

=== RICO ===
In 1978, Aleman was convicted under the Racketeer Influenced and Corrupt Organizations Act of organizing a series of home invasion robberies. Sentenced to thirty years' imprisonment, Aleman spent time at federal correctional facilities in Marion, Illinois; Atlanta, Georgia; Oxford, Wisconsin; and Milan, Michigan. During this time in federal prison, Aleman took some college courses and started painting as a hobby. On April 28, 1989, after serving 11 years in prison, Aleman was released on parole.

== Retrial ==
During the late 1980s, investigators started Operation GamBat, an extensive investigation into decades of corruption and mob ties inside the Chicago court system. In February 1990, fearing prosecution for his actions during the 1977 Logan trial, retired judge Frank J. Wilson shot himself to death at his Arizona retirement home.

In 1991, Aleman pleaded guilty to extorting money from bookmakers Anthony Reitinger and Vince Rizza in 1972. Aleman was convicted and was sentenced to 12 years' imprisonment. In 1993, based on Robert Cooley's testimony, Aleman was re-indicted for the 1972 Logan slaying.

In 1997, Aleman was convicted of the Logan murder and sentenced to 300 years in state prison. Aleman's re-trial and subsequent conviction are historic as he is the first American to be retried for murder following a fraudulent first trial. This was first profiled in 2002 and verified on the A&E Television Network/Biography Channel program "American Justice"/"Notorious," and later on the National Geographic Channel documentary: "National Geographic: Inside" – "Chicago Mob Takedown" in 2011. The retrial, however, does not constitute double jeopardy. The United States Court of Appeals for the Seventh Circuit ruled that the original trial presided by Judge Frank Wilson was a sham – because the acquittal was guaranteed by the bribe he had accepted. This Fifth Amendment ruling was named Harry Aleman vs. Judges of the Criminal Division, Circuit Court of Cook County, Illinois, et al., 1998. It established that bribery affecting a bench trial does not preclude the possibility of a second trial: if in said bench trial the defendant is found not guilty, but evidence shows that an act of bribery took place between the defendant and the judge, the defendant can be retried again for the same crime, and this second trial cannot be considered double jeopardy, as jeopardy had never attached in the first place. In short, as actual loss of life or limb had never been a possibility (unlike in most trials), the first trial, by being conducted by a venal and bribed judge, must be considered a counterfeit one; and any resulting retrial (before a non-venal jurist) must be considered to have original jeopardy attached (i.e., the possibility of actual loss to life or limb is real and true).

== Death ==
Harry Aleman died from complications of lung cancer on May 15, 2010, at Hill Correctional Center in Galesburg, Illinois. He is buried in Waldheim Cemetery in Forest Park, Illinois.

== See also ==
- List of homicides in Illinois § Organized crime
- Double Jeopardy Clause
- Extrinsic fraud, behavior by a prevailing civil litigant external to the litigation, such as bribery of a judge, that prevents the other party from having a full and fair trial, allowing for equitable relief from the original judgement
