= Violent Crime and Racketeering Section =

- Abbreviation: VCRS

Agency overview
- Formed: 2010
- Preceding agencies: Organized Crime and Racketeering Section; Gang Unit; GangTECC

Jurisdictional structure
- Operations jurisdiction: United States

Operational structure
- Agency executive: Deputy Assistant Attorney General, Criminal Division
- Parent agency: Attorney General; Department of Justice; Criminal Division

The Violent Crime and Racketeering Section (VCRS) is a section of the United States Department of Justice Criminal Division created in 2010. VCRS is a group of trial lawyers and prosecutors that develop ways to eradicate significant regional, national, and international organized crime groups and violent gangs. The prosecutors of VCRS are considered "the nation’s foremost experts in racketeering prosecutions." VCRS prosecutes cases brought to it by the Criminal Division, various federal agencies, including the DEA, the ATF, among others. VCRS works alongside prosecutors from the United States Attorney's Office in the Violent Crime Initiative.

VCRS was created by combining and merging components and parts of the following sections and units of the Criminal Division:

- Organized Crime and Racketeering Section
- Gang Unit
- National Gang Targeting Enforcement and Coordination Center (GangTECC)

Note: according to the United States Government, "Gangs" and "Organized crime," are considered different types of entities.

== Leadership ==
- David L. Jaffe, Chief
- Kim Dammers, Principal Deputy
- Elizabeth Yang, Deputy Chief
- Kelly Pearson, Deputy Chief
- Gerald A. Toner, Assistant Chief for Labor-Management Racketeering
