= In re Himmel =

- Court: Supreme Court of Illinois
- Full case name: In re James H. Himmel, Attorney
- Decided: September 22, 1988
- Citation: 125 Ill.2d 531; 533 N.E.2d 790 (Ill. 1988)

Court membership
- Judges sitting: John J. Stamos, Benjamin K. Miller, William G. Clark, Daniel P. Ward, Howard C. Ryan, Thomas J. Moran

Case opinions
- Unanimous opinion by Stamos

In re Himmel, 125 Ill.2d 531, 533 N.E.2d 790 (Ill. 1988), was a case decided by the Supreme Court of Illinois that upheld the suspension of an attorney's license for failing to report misconduct by another attorney.

== Factual background ==
Himmel, an attorney, agreed to represent the 18-year-old victim of a motorcycle accident to recover settlement money from her first attorney. The client had won a $23,000 settlement after the accident, but her first attorney had allegedly pocketed the money instead. The client asked Himmel not to report the first lawyer's misconduct to the Illinois Attorney Registration and Disciplinary Commission (IARDC) because she feared that it would hinder the recovery efforts. Over the course of 24 months, Himmel brokered an agreement where the first attorney promised to pay $75,000 if the client agreed not to prosecute.

In 1986, the IADRC charged Himmel with a violation of Rule 1-103(a) of the Illinois Code of Professional Responsibility for failing to report the first attorney's misconduct.

== Decision ==
The court held that Himmel had a duty to report the misconduct of the first attorney under Rule 1-103(a), which requires lawyers with knowledge of misconduct by another lawyer to report it to the appropriate disciplinary authority. The court held that the client's communication about the first attorney's misconduct was not protected by the attorney–client privilege because she had discussed the matter in the presence of non-privileged third parties (her mother and fiancé).

The court upheld the IADRC's decision to suspend Himmel's license for one year.

== Impact ==
In the years preceding the decision, the Illinois and Chicago bars had been greatly criticized as a result of Operation Greylord, in which lawyers failed to report the misconduct of other attorneys. Months earlier, in a case cited in this decision, In re Anglin, 122 Ill.2d 531, 525 N.E.2d 550 (May 18, 1988), the Illinois Supreme Court refused to reinstate the law license of an attorney convicted of (among other felonies) possessing stolen securities, and who wished to be reinstated while continuing to withhold the name of the person or persons from whom he received the stolen securities. These combined situations greatly increased the frequency of attorney misconduct reporting. In 1988, 154 attorneys were reported for misconduct in Illinois. In 1989, 922 attorneys were reported for misconduct.

Often cited discussion of the Himmel rule are by Richard W. Burke in 3 Geo.J.Legal Ethics 643 (1989-1990) and by Bruce Green in 39 William & Mary Law Review pp. 357–392 (vol. 39, issue 2), although the case has been cited over 300 times, as well as at least mentioned in over 200 law reviews. At least one lawyer has criticized the Himmel rule as more effective at fostering distrust among lawyers than at rooting out misconduct. In 1991, California declined to follow the Himmel rule and adopted Cal. Bus. & Prof. Code § 6068(o), which requires an attorney to self-report misconduct but not the misconduct of other attorneys. The Rhode Island Supreme Court also distinguished the case in In re Ethics Advisory Panel Opinion No. 92-1. The Chicago Bar Association most recently published a mention of the decision in 2004.
