= Marco D'Amico =

American mobster (1936–2020)

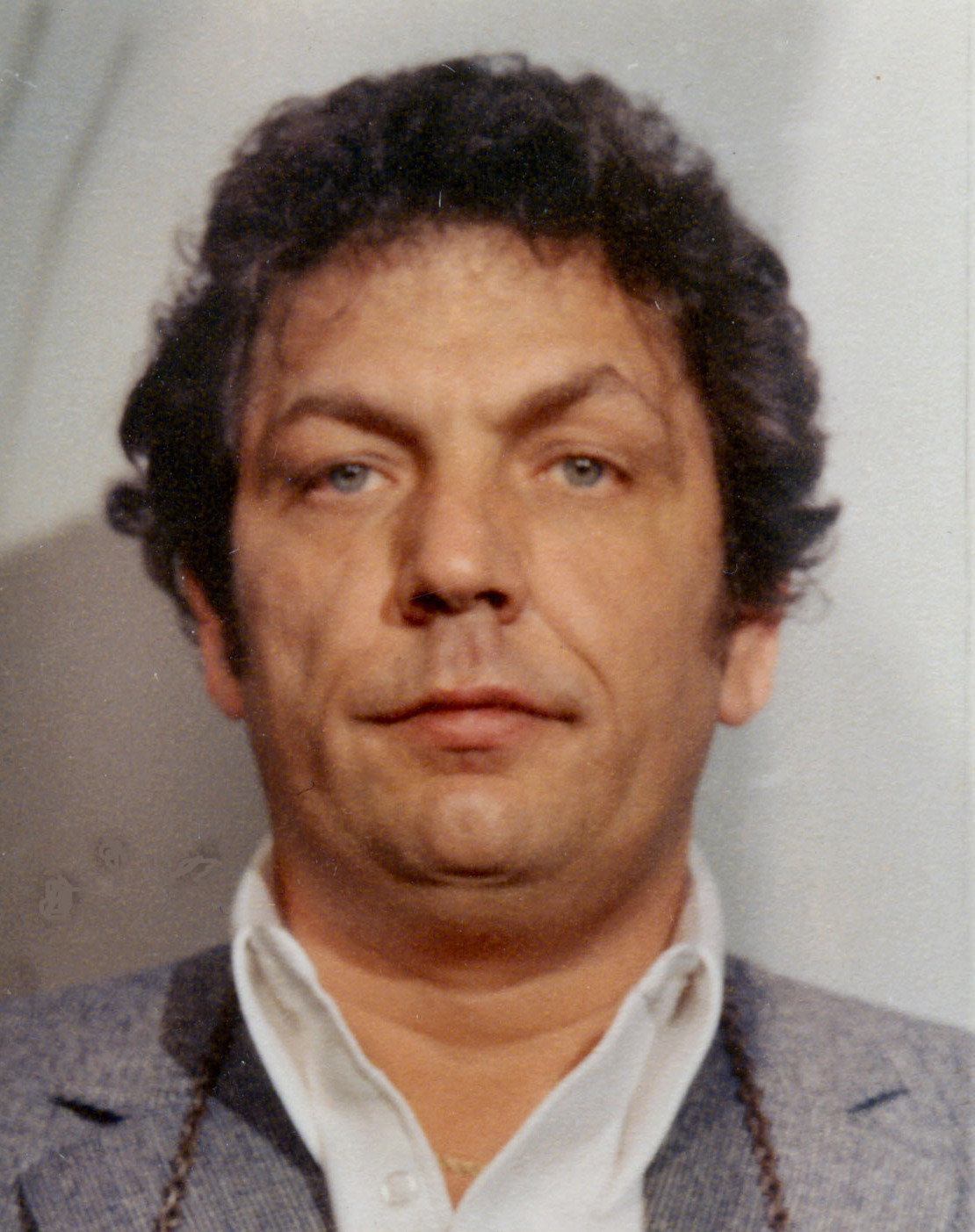
- D'amico in 1979
- Born: January 1, 1936
- Died: April 22, 2020 (aged 84)
- Occupation: Mobster
- Spouse: Patricia D'Amico
- Children: 4
- Allegiance: Chicago Outfit
- Convictions: conspiracy to robbery, gambling, extortion (1995)
- Penalty: 12 years and 3 months' imprisonment

Marco "The Mover" D'Amico (January 1, 1936 – April 22, 2020) was a Chicago mobster and consigliere of the Chicago Outfit crime organization. He admitted his role in the Chicago Outfit in federal court in 1995.

== Chicago Outfit career ==
D'Amico was arrested for gambling in 1958 and 1968 and also for being a patron in an illegal card game in 1976. He also was involved in a fight at the corner of Oak Street and Rush Street, in Chicago, in 1978. He is related by marriage to Robert (Bobby the Boxer) Abbinatti, who is a made man in the Chicago Outfit.

D'Amico has been arrested twice for DUIs, once in 1983 and another time in 1989. In the 1983 DUI, D'Amico was charged with aggravated battery in Palatine, Illinois for biting off a police officers finger during the DUI stop. However, the charges were dropped.

For years, however, D'Amico was believed by organized-crime watchers to be the Chicago Outfit's top sports-gambling figure, and he was frequently spotted at funerals for top mob figures.

On May 20, 1992, D'Amico was brought before a federal grand jury in Chicago after the bombing of a BMW sports car outside the home in Chicago's West Rogers Park neighborhood of Sharon Patrick, the estranged daughter of turncoat mobster Leonard Patrick, who was set to testify for the prosecution against his old boss, mob fixer Gus Alex.

== Indictment, conviction and imprisonment ==
On November 18, 1994, with a five-year statute of limitations set to expire, D'Amico was indicted on charges of conspiring to commit robbery, operating sports bookmaking and poker businesses, using extortion to collect gambling debts and "juice" loans, and conspiring to commit racketeering. Also indicted were Rick lentini, who was D'Amico's top aide, and Robert Abbinanti, a truck driver for Chicago's Streets and Sanitation Department who is related to D'Amico by marriage.

D'Amico, who was ordered held without bond, was accused of running an illegal sports bookmaking business from 1978 until 1992, operating an illegal poker business from 1980 until 1991, attempting extortion against corrupt former attorney Robert Cooley, who was cooperating with authorities and posing as a bookmaker, making "juice," or excessively high, loans at rates of 2 percent a week, extorting "street taxes" from independent illegal bookmakers, and conspiring to rob a moving, high-stakes poker game near Lake Geneva, Wisconsin in late 1989.

After being confronted with incriminating taped evidence and the cooperation of Cooley, D'Amico on May 1, 1995 pleaded guilty to a conspiracy to rob what he had been told was a high-stakes card game in Lake Geneva, in 1989 (in which the take could have been as much as $1 million), running a sports bookmaking business and a high-stakes poker game of his own for years, using extortion to collect gambling debts and "juice" loans, and extorting $1,000-a-month payoffs from former Chicago police officer Robert Cooley so Cooley could operate a poker game in a Chicago social club without mob interference.

On October 3, 1995, United States District Judge Blanche M. Manning sentenced D'Amico to 12 years and 3 months in prison. During his sentencing hearing, D'Amico initially had demanded that the government prove that he was a ranking member of organized crime. However, federal prosecutors had been set to call as many as eight witnesses, including several former mob insiders, to testify that D'Amico was second-in-command in the Chicago Outfit's Elmwood Park "street crew," under John DiFronzo. Instead, D'Amico abruptly backed off demands that the government prove that he was a "made member" of the Chicago Outfit, and signed a stipulation acknowledging his leading role with the Elmwood Park street crew and its link to the mob. By signing this stipulation D'Amico had admitted to his crimes and received a reduced sentence.

D'Amico was released from federal prison on July 21, 2005.

== Later life ==
D'Amico lived for many years in South Barrington, Illinois. In the 1990s, he moved to Naperville, Illinois, where he lived with his daughter and son-in-law until he went to federal prison. Upon his release from federal prison, D'Amico moved to Westchester, Illinois, where he resided with his wife. D'Amico was married to his wife Patricia for over 50 years and has 4 children.

D'Amico's cousin, a former Chicago Police Officer Roland "Ricky" Borelli, was part of D'Amico's gambling operation and was convicted in 1995 and sentenced to 10 months in federal prison.

D'Amico died on April 22, 2020.
