= Himmel, Missouri =

Extinct town in the American state of Missouri

Coordinates: 36°58′34″N 89°45′10″W

Himmel is an extinct town in Stoddard County, in the U.S. state of Missouri. The GNIS classifies it as a populated place.

A post office called Himmel was established in 1920, and remained in operation until 1923. The community derives its name from the last name of I. Himmelberger, a businessperson in the local lumber industry.
