= Strike Force Model =

The Strike Force Model is a model of law enforcement that combines elements of many Federal law enforcement agencies of the United States under the direction and leadership of a single Attorney for the United States Department of Justice. Most often, this Chief has been employed by the United States Department of Justice Criminal Division, but after 1989, these efforts have been consolidated under the United States Attorney's office. This model of team coordination has existed since its first iteration in 1966 with the Buffalo Strike Force of the Organized Crime Strike Force.

Strike Forces that have used the Strike Force Model:

- United States Organized Crime Strike Force
- Medicare Fraud Strike Force
- Organized Crime Drug Enforcement Task Force
- Health Care Fraud Strike Force
- Corporate Fraud Strike Force
- Procurement Collusion Strike Force
- Disruptive Technology Strike Force
- Public Strike Force on Unfair and Illegal Pricing
- Counter-Fentanyl Strike Force
- Elder Fraud Strike Force
- COVID-19 Strike Force
- Firearms Trafficking Strike Force
