= Duty to report misconduct =

The duty to report misconduct is one of the ethical duties imposed on attorneys in the United States by the rules governing professional responsibility. With certain exceptions, an attorney who becomes aware that either a fellow attorney or a judge has committed an act in violation of the rules of ethical conduct must report that violation. Failure to do so subjects the attorney failing to make the report to discipline. The duty extends only to actual knowledge possessed by an attorney. An attorney who has a mere suspicion of misconduct is not required to report that suspicion, nor is the attorney required to conduct any sort of investigation to confirm or dispel that suspicion. The conduct at issue must rise to the level of misconduct under the rules of professional responsibility. Thus, an attorney who witnesses another attorney become intoxicated, engage in adultery, or gamble away a large sum of money is under no duty to report these acts because they are not prohibited by the rules of professional responsibility. Conduct that must be reported, on the other hand, includes matters such as breaching client confidentiality, misusing client funds, tampering with evidence, suborning perjury, offering bribes, and committing criminal acts of violence or dishonesty.

== Exceptions ==
There are several substantial exceptions to the duty to report misconduct. First and foremost, where an attorney learns of the misconduct through a client, the duty of confidentiality to the client trumps the duty to report. The attorney must seek permission of the client to report the misconduct, and if the permission is not granted, the attorney may not report it. Moreover, if reporting the misconduct would harm the client, the attorney may not report it at all. For example, where a client who owns a restaurant tells his attorney, Jones, that a different attorney, Smith, suggested that the client bribe a health inspector, Jones may not report Smith's misconduct unless Jones first gets the client's permission. However, if the client reports that Smith not only made a suggestion that the client bribe the health inspector, but assisted the client in paying the bribe, then Jones may not report this at all because doing so would be harmful to the client.

An attorney also may not report misconduct by another attorney who is the client of the first. If Smith has hired Jones to represent Smith in a legal matter, and Smith confides in Jones during the course of that representation that Smith has stolen money from clients, bribed judges, or otherwise violated the rules of professional conduct, Jones must nevertheless abide by his duty of confidentiality to Smith. Jones is therefore prohibited from reporting those violations.

Finally, an attorney who learns of misconduct by another attorney through a Bar-approved substance abuse program is not required to reveal the misconduct. This is to encourage attorneys who have drug or alcohol problems to seek treatment for those problems by ensuring that they may disclose misconduct prompted by their addiction in the course of seeking treatment for it.

== See also ==
- Mandated reporter
