= Gambling Devices Act of 1962 =

Gambling Devices Act
- Other short titles: Public Law 87-840
- Long title: To amend the Act of January 2, 1951, prohibiting the transportation of gambling devices in interstate and foreign commerce.
- Enacted by: the 87th United States Congress

Codification
- Acts amended: Johnson Act of 1951

Legislative history
- Signed into law by President J.F.K. on October 8, 1962

The Gambling Devices Act of 1962 amends the Johnson Act of 1951. This act defines a "gambling machine" as a slot machine, roulette wheel, or:

"any other machine or mechanical device which is designed and manufactured primarily for use in connection with gambling, and any subassembly or essential part to be used in any such machines, but which is not attached to any such machine or mechanical device as a constituent part."

This act requires businesses and people involved in gambling devices to register annually with the attorney general.

All gambling machines are required to have serial numbers and the name of the manufacturer and the date it was manufactured.
