= Jackie Presser indictment scandal =

The Jackie Presser indictment scandal was a legal and political scandal which began on June 1, 1984. The scandal erupted after attorneys with the United States Department of Justice initiated a prosecution of Teamsters President Jackie Presser on various charges, including fraud and labor racketeering, only to cease prosecution once it was revealed that Presser had been a criminal informant for the Federal Bureau of Investigation (FBI) since the early 1970s. Department of Justice (DOJ) officials came under intense political pressure to resume prosecution, while Presser's attorneys claimed that Presser had permission from DOJ to engage in the alleged crimes in order to mislead organized crime figures. It was later revealed that FBI and DOJ officials may not have kept investigators in other federal agencies and Congress fully informed of Presser's role, and that FBI agents may have overstepped their authority in giving Presser permission to commit crimes. The scandal largely ended after Presser's death on July 9, 1988.

== Jackie Presser ==
In 1952, Jackie Presser became an organizer for the Teamsters. His father, William Presser, was a vice president of the international union and a known associate of Mafia figures in Cleveland, Ohio. Presser quickly rose within the Teamster hierarchy, becoming president of Local 507, a regional elected official, and a pension trustee.

In 1972, Presser, his father, and Teamster president Frank Fitzsimmons became criminal informers for the Internal Revenue Service (IRS), offering the IRS incriminating evidence about rivals in the Teamsters union. The two Pressers also offered evidence against Fitzsimmons in an attempt to get the government to drop prosecution of William Presser on various criminal charges. The three eventually were turned over to the FBI, which began using them as informants as well. Presser began receiving $2,500 a month (roughly $12,500 in 2007 dollars) from the FBI for providing information. Presser was considered a "top-echelon informant", marking him as one of the Bureau's most prized sources.

Shortly thereafter, Presser allegedly received permission from two FBI agents to pad the Local 507 payroll with fake employees. The individuals hired as "ghost employees" were not required to do any work but received substantial paychecks. The paychecks were, it was later claimed, a way of funneling payments to other Teamsters officials and members of the Cleveland mob.

According to court records, in 1974 Jackie Presser became deeply involved in Mafia affairs. He allegedly told the leaders of the Chicago Mafia that he was willing to do them favors in exchange for money and assistance with his own goals and ambitions. Jimmy "The Weasel" Fratianno, a former hitman in the Cleveland mob and later acting head of the Los Angeles Mafia, later testified that Chicago crime boss Joseph Aiuppa told him in 1974 that "if you need anything from Jackie Presser, he said he'll do it for you." Fratianno also testified that he colluded with Presser to set up a union dental program whose profits were skimmed into Presser's and the Mafia's bank accounts. Organizationally, however, Presser was under the control of the Cleveland crime family.

In 1976, Jackie Presser was elected an international vice president of the Teamsters. William Presser had resigned his vice presidency after being convicted of extortion and obstruction of justice. Allegedly, William Presser met with Roy Lee Williams, then president of the Central Conference of Teamsters, a regional council which controlled union locals in 14 Midwestern states (including Ohio). Williams, who was working with the Kansas City crime family, agreed to help Presser convince Teamster President Fitzsimmons to make Jackie a vice president. Jackie Presser's election was unanimous.

Presser was named to Ronald Reagan's presidential transition team in 1980. When his appointment was made public, it created a political scandal and led to calls for him to resign. Reagan aides denied any knowledge of Presser's alleged ties to organized crime. After two weeks, the scandal died out when the transition team completed its work and disbanded.

In 1981, the United States Department of Labor began investigating Presser after receiving allegations he had padded the Local 507 payroll with "ghost employees". A secret affidavit outlining the government's actions and preliminary findings was filed with a federal court in 1982, but never acted on.

On April 15, 1981, Teamster President Frank Fitzsimmons announced he was stepping down due to worsening health. Roy Lee Williams succeeded him in office.

Although turncoat mob leaders and others had long accused Jackie Presser of being a government informant, the first official confirmation came on August 22, 1981. In its August 31 issue, Time magazine reported that Presser and other Teamsters had served as government informants since the early 1970s to avoid possible prosecution. Presser confirmed that he, his father and Fitzsimmons had met with federal agents, but declared that there had been only one meeting in 1972. Days later, at least one newspaper retracted the story. Mafia figures had long doubted claims that Presser was an informant, and the retraction helped renew mob confidence in Presser. The mob's confidence in Presser was reaffirmed a year later when the Justice Department publicly ended its investigation into an alleged kickback scheme.

On April 14, 1983, Roy Williams announced he would resign as Teamsters president after being convicted for conspiring to bribe Senator Howard Cannon. Presser was elected president by the Teamsters on April 21, 1983, to serve the remainder of Williams' term of office. Williams and others later alleged that Mafia families in Chicago, Cleveland and various cities on the East Coast had conspired to secure Presser's election.

In April 1985, the President's Commission on Organized Crime held hearings in Chicago on organized crime involvement in labor unions. During the hearings, Commission members charged that the Mafia controlled the Teamsters, the Laborers, HERE and the International Longshoremen's Association. Former mobsters described numerous syndicate cash bribes and other payments to Presser. Other witnesses testified that Presser had used violence and other illegal methods to intimidate political opponents within the Teamsters. During his own testimony, Presser invoked his Fifth Amendment right against self-incrimination 15 times.

In March 1986, the Commission released a preliminary report on organized crime influence in the Teamsters. The Commission found corruption "so pervasive" that it recommended that the federal government seek court supervision of the union and take it over. Department of Justice lawyers immediately began preparing a civil lawsuit to place the Teamsters under federal control. Presser vigorously opposed the Justice Department's efforts, and planned a five-year legal, public relations, legislative and political counter-attack to keep the Teamsters free from court supervision.

== 1984 indictment attempt ==
Although DOL had begun investigating Presser in 1981, DOJ's failed 1981 prosecution as well as retractions of newspaper stories led many to believe that allegations of criminal wrongdoing by Presser were unfounded. Presser's close political ties to the Reagan administration convinced some that the Republicans were protecting Presser and the Teamsters from prosecution.

The publicity of the Commission hearings, however, led to pressure on elected leaders to get tough on labor racketeers. On May 31, 1984, attorneys with the U.S. Department of Justice sought approval to prosecute Presser for payroll padding based on DOL reports.

Five days later, the Los Angeles Times named Presser as a U.S. government criminal informant. The report quoted unnamed FBI officials, making this the first time that government leaders had confirmed the unverified accusations of mob informants and other reports. Both the FBI and Presser declined to refute the allegations, although FBI officials publicly complained about the report and said they were concerned for Presser's safety.

== 1985 dropped indictment ==
Despite the 1984 press reports, federal prosecutors did not indict Jackie Presser until nearly a year later. For much of the latter half of 1984, DOJ officials delayed issuing a "prosecution memorandum" (an internal DOJ document outlining the charges to be brought, the legal strategy to be employed, and the staff and other resources to be utilized in the prosecution). In February 1985, however, DOJ attorneys finally submitted their prosecution memorandum.

But unnamed top Justice Department officials delayed approving the prosecution for another three months. Finally, in May 1985, the Cleveland-based federal attorneys who had proposed prosecuting Presser were ordered to Washington, D.C. FBI and DOJ officials briefed the attorneys on Presser's usefulness as a criminal informant, and press reports indicated that the attorneys and DOL investigators were surprised to learn of Presser's role. Two months passed, and still no prosecution occurred. On July 17, the foreman of the Cleveland federal grand jury investigating Presser denounced the delay in open court.

On July 23, 1985, DOJ officials announced they were dropping the investigation against Presser. The Department of Justice claimed the investigation lacked "prosecutive merit". Angry Department of Labor investigators refused to comment on DOJ's actions, and the press strongly condemned DOJ's decision.

Three days later, on July 26, NBC News confirmed the June 1984 Los Angeles Times report which named Presser as a secret FBI informant. NBC, however, said Presser's relationship with the FBI was never revealed to DOL or DOJ investigators and attorneys in Cleveland. The NBC report also said that top Justice Department officials agreed to drop the investigation after FBI agents signed affidavits saying "that whatever Jackie Presser did in the embezzlement case was done with their knowledge and consent."

== Congressional investigation ==
The Department of Justice decision to not prosecute Presser prompted members of Congress to investigate the handling of the politically sensitive case. Some congressmen were concerned that Presser's close political ties to the Reagan administration had led to favorable treatment, while others wanted to know why so much time and so many resources had been expended when DOJ had no intention of prosecuting Presser. Additionally, many members of Congress had spent years telling voters that the Teamsters were corrupt, and now voters were demanding an answer as to why Presser was not being called to account. DOJ defended its actions by pointing to Presser's long-time role as a criminal informant, but members of Congress were unhappy that DOJ seemed willing tolerate corruption in the nation's largest labor movement. Senators William V. Roth, Jr. (R-Delaware) and Sam Nunn (D-Georgia) ordered the Permanent Subcommittee on Investigations (PSI) to look into the handling of the case, and Senator Joe Biden (D-Delaware) asked the Judiciary Committee to probe the matter. The PSI quickly asked the FBI, DOJ and DOL to turn over their files on the Presser probe.

Although some members of Congress accused the FBI of misleading Justice officials about Presser's role as a criminal informant, FBI Director William H. Webster revealed that he had informed Attorney General William French Smith about Presser's role in May 1983, and that on at least two other occasions that year DOL and DOJ investigators in Cleveland were told Presser was an FBI source.

After a year of hearings, the Subcommittee on Investigations concluded in its report that rivalries among federal law enforcement agencies and poor supervision of the FBI by DOJ superiors led to the cancellation of the prosecution. The report also said the public nature of the snafu had set back prosecutorial efforts by several years. Subcommittee members also expressed their anger at what they termed "an overall FBI attitude of obfuscation, intransigence and delay" in the Presser case.

== Criminal investigation of FBI promises ==
While the Senate subcommittee investigation continued, other developments led to the reinstatement of the prosecutorial effort.

Realizing that there was public pressure to resume prosecution despite his role as an FBI informant, Presser claimed that he had been given permission to engage in payroll padding by his FBI contacts. DOJ and FBI rules condone the commission of certain crimes so long as the crimes meet certain guidelines, are used solely to protect sources, and permission is secured in advance from top-level DOJ officials. Presser's lawyers argued that the permission given to him by FBI agents should bar any prosecution. Presser's attorneys also said that Presser had requested FBI permission several times to dismiss the "ghost employees" and that FBI agents had turned his requests down.

Presser's claims were undercut when two criminal investigations into FBI behavior began in August 1985.

In August 1985, the Department of Justice's Office of Professional Responsibility began an investigation into whether the three FBI agents handling Presser had told their FBI and DOJ supervisors the truth about their actions and promises. Senior DOJ officials told investigators that the agents did not reveal that they had authorized criminal activity. Investigators also claimed that senior DOJ officials failed to pass on information about Presser's role to the Attorney General's office or to DOL (a charge FBI Director Webster denied).

At the same time, a federal grand jury in Cleveland began a criminal investigation into DOJ's handling of Presser. Presser's uncle, who was also a Teamster official, had been convicted of embezzlement. After just four months, the grand jury concluded that FBI and DOJ officials had illegally withheld information about Presser's role from the defense. The grand jury also found evidence that FBI agents had failed to tell superiors that they had authorized Presser to engage in the payroll-padding scheme at Local 507.

A second federal grand jury investigation opened in Washington, D.C., in April 1986. The second investigation built on the information uncovered by the Cleveland grand jury, and probed whether the three FBI agents handling Presser made false statements to supervisors about their relationship with Presser.

In May 1986, the Department of Justice began a criminal prosecution against one of the FBI agents who had overseen Presser. The agent's signed affidavit that supported Presser's claim that the FBI had sanctioned the "ghost employee" payroll-padding scheme were found to be false. Prosecutors also found that FBI agents continued to meet with Presser for months even though FBI Director Webster had ordered them to stop. The investigation found that Presser may also have informed the FBI that he intended to appoint mob figures as his top union lieutenants, but that this information was never passed on to senior-level administrators. Consequently, the Cleveland grand jury widened its probe to investigate Presser and other officials of Local 507.

== Second indictment ==
On May 15, 1986, Jackie Presser was indicted a second time on fraud and embezzlement charges stemming from the Local 507 payroll-padding case. Presser's indictment came just three days before the opening of the Teamsters convention in Las Vegas, although the indictment was expected to have no effect on Presser's election chances. Also indicted was an FBI agent who was one of Presser's three "controllers". The agent was fired and indicted for making false statements that led DOJ officials to shutter the prosecutorial effort in June 1985. Presser pleaded innocent.

Just days later, the case against Presser took an unexpected twist as the federal judge assigned to Presser's trial was disqualified from the case. U.S. District Court Judge Ann Aldrich was removed from the case after Presser's attorneys accused her of bias. After a hearing which lasted only a few hours, Aldrich was removed from the case—a change which is exceedingly rare in U.S. courts. The trial was handed over to U.S. District Judge John Manos.

Presser's trial took another unexpected turn two weeks later when Judge Manos removed himself on June 17, 1986. A clerk for the 6th Circuit Court of Appeals accidentally unsealed records showing that, in the 1950s, Judge Manos (then a local lawyer) had asked Presser to stir up labor trouble so Manos could obtain more clients. A third judge, U.S. District Judge George White, was assigned to oversee Presser's trial.

Pre-trial hearings dragged on through the remainder of 1986. The government sought to protect Presser's identity as an informant. Presser's attorneys not only sought to expose the relationship but uncover evidence that Presser's actions were sanctioned by the government and had helped lead to the prosecution of other criminals. On December 2, 1986, government officials finally testified in open court that Presser was indeed a valuable and high-level informant who had assisted DOJ in exposing other labor racketeers. The FBI, fearing for Presser's life, offered him protection under the federal witness program, but Presser refused.

== Health-related trial delays and death ==
On January 12, 1987, Presser underwent successful surgery to remove two cancerous tumors on his lung. Presser's trial resumed two months later, with Presser's attorney claiming that the Department of Justice was hiding documents which confirmed Presser was authorized to engage in the payroll-padding scheme.

As the trial continued, Presser's health worsened. In late July 1987, Judge White granted an indefinite delay after Presser's lawyers turned over evidence that Presser's cancer had returned. The trial resumed in September.

Just a month later, however, Presser was so ill it was rumored he would step down as president of the Teamsters. Presser, who had gone to Phoenix, Arizona, for cancer treatment, was forced to issue a press release denying the rumors.

On January 6, 1988, Presser's attorneys asked for an indefinite delay in the trial in order to let Presser recuperate from his cancer treatment. Although trial was scheduled to resume February 15, Judge White agreed to move the trial date back to July 12. Government attorneys argued Presser was well enough for the trial to resume. But after a series of hearings, Judge White declined to resume the trial until July 12.

Presser's health continued to worsen. on May 4, 1988, Presser told the Teamsters' executive board that he would take a four-month leave of absence. Weldon Mathis, the union's secretary-treasurer, took over as acting president. Presser's action came after doctors told him his cancer had returned and that he urgently needed additional chemotherapy. Judge White granted a delay to evaluate Presser's health, leaving the July 12 trial resumption date in jeopardy.

On May 4, 1988, Presser was hospitalized again. Doctors reported that Presser had brain cancer, that four tumors had been found, and that Presser had been flown from the Cleveland Clinic to Barrow Neurological Institute in Phoenix for treatment. Presser's diagnosis touched off a power struggle within the Teamsters over who would succeed him. Government attorneys conceded that it was now unlikely that Presser's trial would ever resume. Presser underwent a successful operation to remove one tumor on May 17. He later had a tumor removed from his pituitary gland.

On June 6, 1988, Judge White indefinitely postponed Presser's trial after doctors said the Teamster leader had only six months to live.

On June 27, Presser—who had returned to Cleveland—was rushed to Lakewood Hospital in serious condition. Initial reports indicated that he had suffered some sort of cardiac problem, but later tests determined he had a blood clot in his right lung.

Jackie Presser died late in the evening on July 9, 1988, from cardiac arrest brought on by a combination of cancer and heart trouble.

With his death, the scandal concerning his prosecution ended. Legal activity continued against the Teamsters union and several Teamster leaders, as well as certain FBI and DOJ agents and officials. But members of Congress, the press and the public lost interest in the prosecution of such "small fish", and the scandal died out.
