= National Gang Targeting Enforcement and Coordination Center =

GangTECC

Agency overview
- Formed: July 25, 2006
- Dissolved: 2010

Jurisdictional structure
- Operations jurisdiction: United States

Operational structure
- Agency executive: John J. Sieder, Director
- Parent agency: Attorney General; Department of Justice; Criminal Division

The National Gang Targeting, Enforcement and Coordination Center (GangTECC) was an American multi-agency federal law enforcement center created by the United States Attorney General to investigate, disrupt and dismantle violent gangs in the United States. GangTECC was a program of the United States Department of Justice Criminal Division, with an attorney from the Criminal Division being assigned as its director. GangTECC were considered subject matter experts on gangs, and were the "one-stop-shop" for investigators and prosecutors at all levels of law enforcement in the United States.

GangTECC was composed of members from the;

- Criminal Division
- Federal Bureau of Investigation
- Bureau of Alcohol, Tobacco, Firearms and Explosives
- Drug Enforcement Administration
- United States Marshalls
- Bureau Of Prisons
- Immigration and Customs Enforcement.

GangTECC also worked with Gang Squad prosecutors and with the team at the National Gang Intelligence Center.

GangTECC's mission provided that it:

- Assisted the initiation of gang-related investigations
- Aided in the coordination, deconfliction, and effectiveness of gang-related initiatives, investigations, and prosecutions
- Developed and enhanced understanding of the national gang problem
- Proposed strategies to neutralize the most violent and significant threats

In 2010, GangTECC worked closely with the DEA Special Operations Division.

Later in 2010, GangTECC was dissolved, and elements of it were divided across the Department of Justice.
