= Pat Marcy =

American political boss (1913–1993)

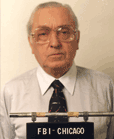
- Born: Pasqualino Marciano; September 6, 1913; Chicago, Illinois
- Died: March 13, 1993 (aged 79)
- Other name: Pat Marcy

Pat Marcy (born Pasqualino Marciano, September 6, 1913 – March 13, 1993) was an Italian-American political boss who wielded enormous power over the Illinois Democratic Party during much of the 20th century. According to Federal prosecutors, as well as informants Robert Cooley and Michael J. Corbitt, he was also a trusted and valued associate of the Chicago Outfit and the American Mafia. His official title was, "Secretary of the First Ward." FBI agent William Roemer, testifying before the U.S. Senate in 1983, said he believed Marcy to be a made man in the Chicago Outfit.

== Early life and career ==
Marcy was born Pasqualino Marciano in Chicago, Illinois on September 6, 1913, to an Italian American family.

Marciano was a gunman for Al Capone's gang. He became the head of Chicago's old First Ward which encompassed Downtown Chicago, and controlled everything from the governor down. Alderman Fred Roti and Democratic Committeeman John D'Arco, Sr., both of whom also had close ties to the Chicago Outfit, took direct orders from Marcy. Marcy regularly met with the mob's main enforcers at Counsellors Row restaurant, across the street from Chicago City Hall.

== FBI investigation ==
Beginning in the 1950s, the Federal Bureau of Investigation (FBI) tried for over three decades to bring down Marcy and his associates. According to former FBI agent William F. Roemer, Jr., their tactics included illegally bugging the First Ward's headquarters at 100 North LaSalle Street in 1962. Although the bug, dubbed "Shade", revealed a great deal about the activities of the First Ward's political machine, nothing could be used in court.

Finally, in the mid 1980s, criminal defense attorney and longtime First Ward associate Robert Cooley secretly approached Federal prosecutors, declaring: "I want to help you destroy the First Ward. I want to help you destroy Pat Marcy." Cooley proceeded to wear a wire while meeting with Marcy and several other First Ward members, including D'Arco and Roti, implicating them in numerous acts of corruption, including fixing trials on the Outfit's behalf. According to Cooley, Marcy had influence in Cook County politics, job appointments in law enforcement, and court decisions.

During the same period, Michael Corbitt, the imprisoned former police chief of Willow Springs, Illinois, began cooperating with federal prosecutors. According to Corbitt, Marcy was so trusted by the Outfit that money skimmed from casinos in Central America and Las Vegas was delivered directly to him.

== Imprisonment and death ==
As a result of these investigations, Marcy was indicted (91 CR 1045) with one count of conspiracy under the Racketeer Influenced and Corrupt Organizations Act (RICO), six counts of bribery, and six counts of extortion. Marcy died during the trial, in March 1993.
