= Robert Cooley (lawyer) =

American lawyer

Robert Cooley (born 1943) is a former Mafia lawyer, government informant and author of the 2004 autobiography, "When Corruption was King."

== Early life ==
Cooley was born in 1943 to an Irish-American family which lived in the Greater Grand Crossing section of Chicago's Southeast Side. His father was a Chicago Police officer, as were his grandfathers – both of whom had died in the line of duty.

== Informant ==
In 1986 Cooley became disgusted by the people he worked for. He approached the U.S. Justice Department's Organized Crime Strike Force and declared, "I'd like to help you destroy the First Ward. I want to help you destroy Pat Marcy." He proceeded to work undercover as part of an FBI probe known as "Operation GambAt" (for "gambling attorney"). His work ultimately sent 24 men to prison, including Chicago Outfit mobsters, politicians, police officers, and judges.
