= Rudy Fratto =

American gangster

- Born: Rudolph Fratto; December 12, 1943 (age 82); Chicago, Illinois, U.S.
- Occupation: Mobster
- Allegiance: Chicago Outfit
- Criminal charges: Tax evasion Extortion

Rudolph "Rudy" Fratto (born December 12, 1943) is an American mobster and high-ranking member of the Chicago Outfit crime syndicate. He has been known as a member since at least 2002.

== Chicago Outfit career ==
In 2002, the Chicago Sun-Times called Fratto a "reputed Elmwood Park street lieutenant." His name had come up during a sentencing hearing for a former Chicago police Chief of Detectives, in which Fratto was shown on FBI surveillance tapes to have held meetings with the former Chief of Detectives.

In 2005, Fratto was identified in the Sun-Times as having met with Michael "Mickey" Marcello, the half-brother of reputed mob boss James Marcello, to approve efforts by the Marcellos to take over the video poker in several Chicago suburbs, including Cicero and Berwyn. Later that year, Fratto was reported to have been one of five mob bosses at a meeting at an Elmwood Park, Illinois restaurant with the mayor of Rosemont, Illinois. At that meeting they discussed how the Chicago Outfit would control contracts at a casino in Rosemont, according to testimony by FBI agent John Mallul. The other bosses at the meeting were Joseph Lombardo, Joseph Andriacchi, John DiFronzo and Peter DiFronzo.

=== Indictments and convictions ===
In September 2009, Fratto was indicted on tax evasion charges for allegedly not having reported nearly $200,000 in income in 2005. Also in 2009, Fratto and John DiFronzo were alleged in a civil lawsuit by Joseph Fosco, the son of late Teamsters treasurer Armando Fosco, to have tried to extort $400,000 from Fosco.

Fratto subsequently was convicted for evading federal income tax payments for seven years. On January 27, 2010, he was sentenced to one year and one day in federal prison and ordered to pay restitution of $141,000. He was released in July 2011. It was reported in May 2017 that Fratto had stopped paying the restitution since at least early 2016.

On October 27, 2011, Fratto pleaded guilty in a separate bid-rigging scheme involving forklift contracts for two trade exhibitions at a large exposition center in Chicago. On September 26, 2012, Judge Harry Daniel Leinenweber sentenced Fratto to about 1 year in federal prison, which was significantly less than the up to 2 years in prison that federal sentencing guidelines had called for.

== Personal ==
Fratto is the nephew of Louis Fratto, an associate of Al Capone and reputed Des Moines, Iowa mob boss from 1930 until 1967. Fratto was reportedly made in 1988, possibly in the same ceremony as Salvatore "Solly D" DeLaurentis and John "Pudgy" Matassa. He lives in Darien, Illinois.
