= Gerald Scarpelli =

American hitman and government witness (1938–1989)

- Scarpelli's July 10, 1972 mugshot
- Born: Gerald Hector Scarpelli; January 22, 1938; New York City, New York, U.S.
- Died: May 2, 1989 (aged 51); Chicago, Illinois, U.S.
- Cause of death: Suicide by hanging
- Occupation: Mobster
- Allegiance: Chicago Outfit

Gerald Hector Scarpelli (January 22, 1938 – May 2, 1989) was an American mobster and hitman for the Chicago Outfit crime family who later became a government witness.

== Early life ==
Scarpelli was born in Manhattan, New York and raised in Chicago, where he grew up the son of a baker in the Italian-American enclave of Taylor Street on the city's Near West Side. Scarpelli, a lifelong fitness fanatic, boxed as an amateur in his youth and graduated from Austin High School in 1957.

== Criminal career ==
Scarpelli was arrested in 1960, the first of 18 arrests in his criminal record. In July 1965, Scarpelli pleaded guilty to armed robbery in Wisconsin and received a suspended sentence and probation. Thirty days later, Scarpelli was arrested for burglary in Illinois.

A Chicago Outfit associate in the Cicero crew headed by caporegime Joseph Ferriola for several years, Scarpelli gained a reputation as a leading loan shark. He oversaw illegal gambling operations in the suburban neighborhoods of Southwest Chicago. Scarpelli had dreams of being a legitimate business owner, but never realized them. He opened a boutique at one point, but it failed in a few months. His other ambition was to open an automobile salvage yard, but could not achieve it due to his criminal record.

=== Mob hitman ===
On March 11, 1979, Scarpelli participated in the murder of George Christofalos, the owner of a roadhouse in North Chicago. Mobster John Borsellini had received permission from the Outfit leadership to murder Christofalos because he was impeding one of Borsellini's rackets. On March 11, 1979, Borsellini and Scapelli drove to Christafalos' club and waited for him in their car. When Christafalos emerged from the club and got in his car, the two masked hitmen went over to him carrying shotguns. While Scapelli guarded two passbys, Borsellini shot and killed Christafalos. Two months later, Borsellini was found dead in a field; Scarpelli was considered the prime murder suspect.

On another occasion, Scarpelli participated with Michael Oliver in a raid on an adult bookstore in Elk Grove Village during which Oliver was shot. Scarpelli and others buried a still masked Oliver in an area from which law enforcement were later to recover five bodies.

In 1980, Scarpelli and three other mobsters murdered William Dauber and his wife Charlotte. Dauber was a ruthless Outfit mobster who had gained control over the South Side auto chop shops, places where stolen automobiles were disassembled so the parts could be sold. Dauber worked for Outfit boss Albert Caesar Tocco. However, Tocco had grown tired of Dauber's independence and started worrying that Dauber was working with law enforcement. After getting word that Dauber would be attending court on July 2, 1980, Scarpelli, Butch Petrocelli, Jerry Scalise and Frank Calabrese, Sr., stalked the Daubers from court, finally closing in on a country road to open fire with an M1 carbine and a shotgun. The Daubers sustained multiple gunshot wounds, Scarpelli shot Bill Dauber two more times in the head with the shotgun at close range.

== Arrest and suicide ==
On July 31, 1988, Scarpelli was arrested by federal agents for a robbery in Michigan City, Indiana. After being confronted with wiretap conversations from James "Duke" Basile, a Scapelli crew member, discussing assassination methods, Scarpelli agreed to become an informant. Scarpelli eventually admitted his involvement in the 1980 Dauber murders as well as the murders of mob chauffeur Gerald Carusiello and chop shop owner Timothy O'Brien.

On May 2, 1989, two days before a court ruling on his robbery charges, Gerald Scarpelli died after hanging himself in a shower stall at the Metropolitan Correctional Center in Chicago. Scarpelli allegedly killed himself because a judge had recently ruled against him regarding the Basile tapes.
