= James Marcello =

American mobster incarcerated in a US federal prison

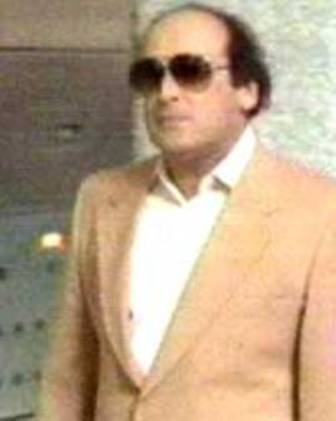
- Born: James J. Marcello; December 13, 1943 (age 82); Chicago, Illinois, U.S.
- Other names: "Little Jimmy"; "Jimmy Light"; "Jimmy the Man"
- Occupation: Crime boss
- Spouse: Sandra
- Children: 3
- Status: Incarcerated
- Allegiance: Chicago Outfit
- Conviction: Murder
- Penalty: Life imprisonment (2009)

Details
- Imprisoned at: ADX Florence

James J. Marcello (born December 13, 1943), also known variously as "Little Jimmy", "Jimmy Light" and as "Jimmy the Man", is an American crime boss who was the boss for the Chicago Outfit criminal organization during the early and mid 2000s. Organized crime observers identified Marcello as a figurehead during that period while the organization's day-to-day operations actually were run by John "No Nose" DiFronzo, Joseph "Joey the Clown" Lombardo, Joseph "Joe the Builder" Andriacchi and Angelo J. LaPietra.

== Early career ==
Born in Chicago, Marcello worked as a laborer for Chicago's Department of Streets and Sanitation from 1960 until 1973.

Marcello reportedly became a "made" member in the Chicago mob in 1983—a step that, a mob turncoat testified in 2007, required an individual to be of 100 percent Italian heritage and also to have participated in at least one killing. Actually (and perhaps unknown to Marcello's bosses), Marcello's mother was Irish.

Although he had no criminal record, Marcello first became identified by authorities as a critical member of the Chicago Outfit in the 1980s because of his role as a driver for Chicago mob bosses Joseph Aiuppa and Sam "Wings" Carlisi and as a confidant to Carlisi.

== Carlisi trial ==
On December 15, 1992, federal authorities charged Marcello and reputed mob boss Sam "Wings" Carlisi with racketeering. Marcello was accused of being the underboss for Carlisi, whose street crew worked its rackets in Chicago's western suburbs. On December 16, 1993, Marcello, Carlisi and five other crew members were convicted on racketeering charges, with Marcello in particular being found to have run bookmaking, street-tax and juice-loan operations in western Cook County and in DuPage County. Marcello and Carlisi also were convicted of plotting the never-carried-out murder of gangland associate Anthony Daddino because of fears that Daddino would cooperate with law enforcement after a 1989 extortion conviction, and Marcello also was convicted of financing long-time mobster Lenny Patrick's juice-loan operation. In addition, Marcello was found to have ordered Patrick to firebomb the Lake Theater in Oak Park, Illinois during a union dispute.

On April 5, 1995, Marcello was sentenced to 12½ years in prison. During his sentencing, he told U.S. District Judge Paul Plunkett, "If my name wasn't James Marcello, I wouldn't be standing in front of you. That's all I have to say," according to an April 6, 1995, Chicago Tribune article. In November 2003, Marcello was released from a federal prison camp in Milan, Michigan and returned to his home in Lombard, Illinois. During the Family Secrets trial, it came out that Marcello began working at some point after his 2003 release from prison for DVD Management, an Oakbrook Terrace, Illinois-based operator of nursing homes.

== Family Secrets Trial ==
In April 2005, Marcello and his younger half-brother, Michael "Mickey" Marcello, were indicted on murder and racketeering charges. Marcello was accused of murdering Nicholas D'Andrea in 1981, attempting to kill Nicholas Sarillo Sr. in 1982, and murdering brothers Anthony "Tony the Ant" Spilotro and Michael Spilotro in 1986. Until his indictment, James Marcello also was identified as running the Cicero, Illinois, crew faction of the Outfit with his brother Michael. The indictment alleged that both Marcellos had operated a lucrative video-gambling business, named M&M Amusement, that had placed video-gambling machines in businesses in Berwyn, Illinois and Cicero, Illinois from January 1996 until April 2004.

Shortly after he was indicted, Marcello attempted to be released on bond, offering to put up homes worth $12.5 million as bond and also offering to permit law enforcement officials to intercept his telephone calls. The homes included a $9 million house in Oak Brook, Illinois that was owned by Marcello's niece, Theresa Borsellino, and her husband; $1.1 million of equity in a house in Oak Brook that was owned by Nicholas Vangel—described as Marcello's employer—and his wife, Dorothy; a house in Palos Hills, Illinois owned by Marcello's son, James Marcello, Jr.; a summer house in Michigan City, Indiana owned by James Marcello, Jr.; a farm in McHenry County, Illinois owned by James Marcello, Jr.; and two homes in Long Beach, Indiana owned by James Marcello, Jr.'s boss. On April 29, 2005, however, U.S. District Judge James Zagel denied Marcello's request to be released on bond.

On June 21, 2007, the "Operation Family Secrets" trial began in Chicago. The case was prosecuted by federal mob prosecutors Mitch Mars, T. Markus Funk, and John Scully. Although several other high-profile defendants, including Frank Calabrese, Sr., and Joseph Lombardo, took the highly unusual step of testifying in their own defense, Marcello opted not to take the stand to testify. On September 10, 2007, Marcello was convicted of racketeering conspiracy that involved decades of extortion, loan sharking and murder.

On February 5, 2009, Marcello was sentenced to life in prison for the Spilotro murders, and United States District Judge James Zagel, agreeing with the presentation made by federal prosecutor Markus Funk, also found Marcello responsible for the D'Andrea murder as well, even though the jury had deadlocked on that count. "Mr. Marcello, you did have the appropriate demeanor in court," United States District Judge James Zagel told Marcello. "I believe you possess abilities that your co-defendants (Frank Calabrese, Sr. and Joseph Lombardo) did not have. I believe you have self-control and judgment that your co-defendants did not have...You know how to do the right thing....What is most significant is that you could have done better, because perhaps unlike your co-defendants, you know how to do better. I regret that you did not lead a better life. You are going to pay for your crimes."

Right after his sentencing in 2009, Marcello was sent to be incarcerated at the high-security United States Penitentiary, Atwater, near Atwater, California. However, the U.S. attorney's office in Chicago ordered him returned to the federal Metropolitan Correctional Center in Chicago to be present for a hearing on a related legal matter, and Zagel then approved Marcello's extended stay for his appeal. With Marcello's appeals virtually exhausted, the federal government—without Zagel's permission—began transferring Marcello to Atwater in early February 2012. However, on February 9, 2012, Zagel angrily demanded that Marcello be brought back to Chicago to help his attorney with his pending appeal. Arguments in Marcello's appeal were scheduled for February 13, 2012, and Zagel acknowledged the tight turnaround as he publicly excoriated the federal government for transferring Marcello out of Chicago without Zagel's permission. "I don't even know how they're going to get him back," Zagel said, referring to the Federal Bureau of Prisons. "But they are going to get him back here because that's my order...He will remain here until I order him released."

Marcello currently is imprisoned at the ADX Florence supermax prison in Colorado.

== Personal life ==
Marcello is the son of Samuel Marcello, a Chicago mobster who disappeared in November 1973 after collecting a juice loan from a Chicago restaurant owner. Samuel Marcello's body was not found until July 6, 1974, when it was uncovered in a 50-gallon steel drum left at the sandwich shop. The sandwich shop owner, Sam Rantis, had been found dead earlier in 1974, his body stuffed into his car trunk at O'Hare International Airport. Law enforcement believed at the time that Rantis was blamed by the mob for the deaths of Samuel Marcello, and fellow mobster Joseph Grisafe, and he was slain in retaliation. Marcello's mother, Irene Flynn (later Irene Marcello, and later Irene Marcello Evans), was of Irish descent. She died in mid-February 2009, less than two weeks after her son James Marcello was sentenced to life in prison.

Marcello's sister, Ann, is married to William Galioto, a former police officer who has been listed as a lieutenant on the Chicago Crime Commission's organizational chart of Chicago organized crime. In 1995, William Galioto, Ann Galioto, and William Galioto's son, Sam Galioto, were denied a $5.5 million loan from City of Chicago officials to build a video and movie production center because of city officials' fears that the family might have organized crime ties.

Marcello has been married to Sandra Marcello since the early 1960s and has three children with her, Samuel, James Marcello, Jr., and Rocco. He had two daughters, Debbie and Mary, by an extramarital relationship.

Marcello had a mistress for more than two decades who took his last name and testified for the prosecution in the Family Secrets trial. Connie Marcello told jurors in 2007 that James Marcello had given her thousands of dollars a month in cash.

== See also ==
- List of Italian American mobsters
- List of crime bosses convicted in the 21st century

Preceded by John DiFronzo	Chicago Outfit Front Boss; 2003–2007	Succeeded by John DiFronzo
