= Nicholas Calabrese =

American gangster (1942–2023)

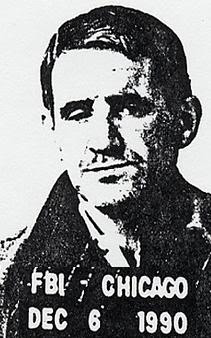
- Calabrese's December 6, 1990 FBI mugshot
- Born: November 30, 1942; Chicago, Illinois, U.S.
- Died: March 13, 2023 (aged 80)
- Other name: "Nicky Slim"
- Occupation: Mobster
- Relatives: Frank Calabrese Sr. (brother)
- Allegiance: Chicago Outfit
- Convictions: Racketeering (1997); Murder, racketeering (2007)
- Penalty: 70 months' imprisonment (1997); 12 years and four months' imprisonment (2009)

Nicholas W. Calabrese (November 30, 1942 – March 13, 2023) was an American mobster and hitman, best known for being the first "made man" to testify against the Chicago Outfit. His testimony and cooperation with federal prosecutors helped result in the 2007 murder convictions of mobsters Joseph Lombardo, James Marcello, and his own brother, Frank Calabrese Sr.

== Early life and work outside of the Chicago Outfit ==
Calabrese was born the son of James and Sophie Calabrese, growing up near the intersection of Grand and Ogden Avenues on Chicago's Near West Side. As a boy, Calabrese worked at a newsstand at the corner of Grand Avenue and State Street, in downtown Chicago, where some of his brothers had worked as well. Calabrese graduated from Steinmetz High School in Chicago.

Calabrese served in Vietnam in the United States Navy from 1965 until 1967, working as a radioman and having top-secret clearance on the USS Bainbridge. Calabrese also had worked as an ironworker on the John Hancock Center construction project in Chicago, as a Teamster working for trade show contractor United Exposition at Chicago's McCormick Place and as a Cook County security officer at the courthouse in Maywood, Illinois, from 1977 until 1989.

In the 1970s, Calabrese and two partners operated a restaurant and lounge in Hoffman Estates, Illinois, for a couple of years, and also worked for a private detective agency.

== Chicago Outfit career ==
From 1978 until 1992, Calabrese helped his brother, noted Chicago Outfit soldier Frank Calabrese Sr., run a lucrative loan-sharking racket, serving as his brother's top assistant. Frank and Nick reported to Angelo J. "The Hook" LaPietra, the caporegime of the 26th Street Crew, who ran operations out of the Old Neighborhood Italian American Club. Calabrese also has admitted in court to taking part in 14 murders ordered by LaPietra, including the "hits" on Michael Albergo and John Fecarotta, from 1970 until 1986, as part of Calabrese's time in the mob. The "juice loan" business charged interest rates on loans of as much as 10 percent per week (14,000% APR). Nicholas Calabrese and his brother Frank were both inducted as "made" members of the Outfit during an induction ceremony conducted by Joey Aiuppa at a restaurant on Roosevelt Road on October 9, 1983.

On July 28, 1995, the federal government indicted Nicholas Calabrese and nine other organized crime figures with using threats, violence and intimidation to enforce the loan sharking racket from 1978 until 1992. The other defendants were Frank Calabrese Sr., Frank Calabrese Jr., Kurt Calabrese, Robert Dinella, Philip J. Fiore, Terry Scalise, Kevin Kudulis, Louis Bombacino and Philip Tolomeo.

Calabrese eventually was found guilty of racketeering. On August 27, 1997, Calabrese, who at that time was residing in Norridge, Illinois, was sentenced by United States District Judge James F. Holderman to 70 months in federal prison. At his sentencing, Nicholas Calabrese apologized to Holderman, saying, "I caused a lot of problems for a lot of people."

== Family Secrets trial and conviction ==
On February 21, 2003, Chicago Tribune columnist John Kass broke the story that Calabrese was talking to the Federal Bureau of Investigation, and noted that Calabrese had disappeared from the federal prison in Milan, Michigan, and that Calabrese's federal prison records had disappeared altogether, leading Kass to believe that Calabrese had entered the United States Federal Witness Protection Program. FBI agents also had spread out across the country with search warrants, collecting DNA evidence, hair cuttings and oral swabs from many reputed Chicago Outfit members.

On April 25, 2005, federal prosecutors indicted 12 Chicago Outfit figures—including Calabrese—and two former police officers on charges of murder, illegal gambling, and loan sharking. Dubbed "Operation Family Secrets", the probe that led up to the indictments had relied heavily on Calabrese's cooperation. Newspapers reported that Calabrese had been confronted with DNA evidence implicating him in the 1986 mob hit of mob enforcer John Fecarotta, prompting Calabrese to cooperate with law enforcement in the probe.

After various plea agreements and the deaths of two defendants, ultimately five other defendants—Joseph Lombardo, James Marcello, Frank Calabrese Sr., Paul Schiro and Anthony Doyle—went to trial. Calabrese formally entered a plea of guilty to murder and racketeering on May 18, 2007. On July 16, 2007, Nicholas Calabrese took the witness stand and admitted to committing murders with Marcello, Schiro and his brother Frank Calabrese Sr. Nicholas Calabrese admitted to having committed a total of 14 murders, and as part of his deal for cooperating, federal prosecutors agreed not to prosecute him for any of the 14 murders, thus sparing him the sentence of life in prison that he could have received had he been convicted of even one murder. Prosecutors also agreed to recommend a sentence of less than life in prison.

While on the stand, Calabrese stated that his association with the Chicago Outfit dated to May 1970, and that he began cooperating with the government in January 2002, after federal investigators confronted him with a bloody glove containing his DNA that he had inadvertently dropped at the scene of the Fecarotta slaying. Calabrese also acknowledged that he had been joined in the Fecarotta murder by his brother Frank Calabrese Sr. and now-deceased mobster John Monteleone.

Calabrese also provided details on the infamous slayings of Chicago Outfit member Anthony Spilotro and Outfit associate Michael Spilotro, in 1986, in which Calabrese said he was one of a large number of mobsters who participated. The Spilotro murders were depicted—with many details changed—in the 1995 Martin Scorsese-directed movie, Casino.

Calabrese admitted that he initially had lied to the FBI after he began cooperating, initially concealing Marcello's role in the Spilotros' killing because Marcello had been paying Calabrese's wife $4,000 a month while Calabrese was in prison.

In 2007, Lombardo, Marcello, Schiro and Frank Calabrese Sr. all were convicted on murder and racketeering charges, while Doyle was convicted on racketeering charges. In February 2009, Lombardo, Marcello and Frank Calabrese Sr. all were sentenced to life in prison. At Marcello's sentencing hearing in February 2009; Patrick Spilotro, brother of Michael and Anthony, gave a victim impact statement in which he stated he had personally encouraged Calabrese to begin cooperating with the government.

== Sentencing ==
On March 26, 2009, Nick Calabrese was sentenced by United States District Judge James Zagel to 12 years and four months in prison. Prior to sentencing Calabrese, Zagel told some of Calabrese's victims' family members who were in the courtroom, "the law provides for leniency, undeserved leniency, for those who can testify truthfully about what has happened to those missing loved ones...Few in prisons will ever come forward to confess if leniency is not possible." Upon sentencing Calabrese, Zagel told him, "I think what you did does make amends by allowing penalties to be paid for the murders of others and for allowing families to know how and why their [loved ones] died." Calabrese had said, "I can't go back and undo what I done... I stand before you a different man, a changed man." Zagel doubted Calabrese's conscience would ever truly be free. No matter how long he lived or in what protected place it would be, Calabrese would always have to look over his shoulder, the judge noted. Zagel said, "The organization whose existence you testified to will not forgive or relent in their pursuit of you."

== Death ==
Calabrese died on March 13, 2023, at the age of 80. Details on his life after his sentencing, including when he was released from prison, are unclear.
