= Joseph Ferriola =

American gangster

- Ferriola's October 23, 1969 mugshot
- Born: Joseph Anthony Ferriola; March 16, 1927; Chicago, Illinois, U.S.
- Died: March 11, 1989 (aged 61); Houston, Texas, U.S.
- Other names: "Joe Nagall"; "Mr. Clean"; "Oscar"
- Occupation: Crime boss
- Allegiance: Chicago Outfit

Joseph Anthony Ferriola (March 16, 1927 – March 11, 1989), also known as "Joe Nagall," "Mr. Clean" and "Oscar," was an American mobster who was front boss of the Chicago Outfit, from 1985 to 1988, after Joseph Aiuppa and John Cerone went to prison for skimming Las Vegas casino profits.

== Early life ==
Joseph Anthony Ferriola came from Chicago's Near West Side. He was the father of one son, Nicholas Ferriola who followed his father into organized crime.

== Chicago Outfit career ==
Ferriola began his career as a protégé of the late mobster Leonard "Fat Lennie" Caifano. Fat Lennie was Marshall Joseph Caifano's brother.

In 1970, Ferriola and four other mobsters were convicted for conspiring to operate an interstate gambling ring. He was sentenced to five years in federal prison, but only served about three years. He later became one of the Outfit's top enforcers, working in particular as an enforcer for Sam Giancana. A 1989 article in the Chicago Tribune reported that federal agents had described Ferriola as a "cold-blooded terrorist" and as one of the most feared men in the mob.

During his mob career, Ferriola was the boss of his own street crew, the Cicero Crew, based in Cicero, Illinois with Ernest 'Rocco' Infelise serving as his underboss. This crew was involved in activities such as extortion, loan sharking, and bookmaking. To protect these enterprises, they resorted to bribery, corruption, and the occasional murder of someone who was a threat to their operation.

In 1985, Ferriola became operations chief for the Chicago Outfit. After suffering health problems and dealing with legal inquiries by the Federal Bureau of Investigation and the Internal Revenue Service, Ferriola was replaced in late 1988 by Sam "Wings" Carlisi.

At the time of Ferriola's death, federal prosecutors were in the process of seeking an indictment of Ferriola on racketeering charges.

== Personal ==
Ferriola attracted significant attention shortly after taking over as head of the Chicago Outfit because he constructed a $500,000, 14-room home on Forest Glen Lane in Oak Brook, Illinois, about a mile from the home of mobster Joseph Aiuppa. Ferriola also owned a home in Florida and a tri-level log home in Green Lake, Wisconsin.

Ferriola's son, Chicago Outfit mobster Nicholas Ferriola, was sentenced by United States District Judge James Zagel on September 9, 2008, to three years in prison for taking part in a broad, Outfit conspiracy trial that later led to life prison sentences for Joseph Lombardo, James Marcello and Frank Calabrese, Sr. Nicholas Ferriola, who was the godson of Calabrese, had been convicted of running a gambling operation and attempting to extort the owner of the Connie's Pizza chain.

Ferriola's nephew, Harry Aleman, was an imprisoned Chicago Outfit enforcer and hitman. He died in a downstate Illinois prison in May 2010.

== Death ==
On March 11, 1989, Ferriola died at The Methodist Hospital in Houston, Texas, after receiving a second heart transplant. He was 61 years old and had been a patient of Dr. Michael E. DeBakey, one of the world's foremost heart specialists.

American Mafia
Preceded by Joseph Aiuppa	Chicago Outfit Boss; 1986–1989	Succeeded by Sam Carlisi
