= Solly DeLaurentis =

American mobster

Salvatore "Solly D" DeLaurentis (born 1939) is an American mobster and the reputed current boss of the Chicago Outfit, replacing John DiFronzo in 2018.

== Criminal career ==
In August 1993, DeLaurentis was sentenced to 18 1/2 years in prison for racketeering, extortion, and tax fraud, he was released in 2006.
