= T. Markus Funk =

American attorney-at-law

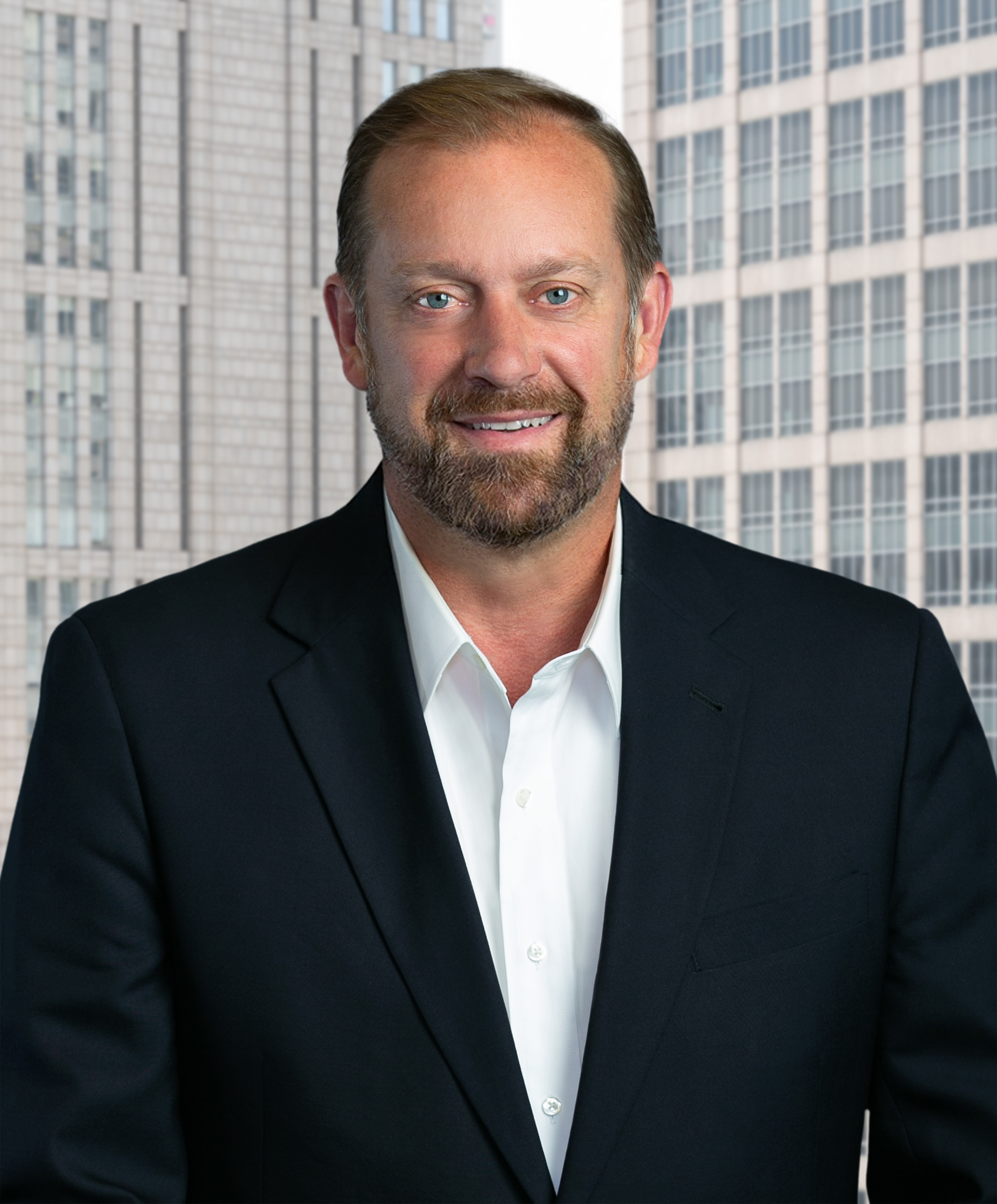
- Education: Ph.D. University of Oxford; J.D. Northwestern Law School; University of Illinois
- Occupations: Attorney; Author; Law Professor
- Employer(s): White & Case LLP
- Known for: Former Assistant United States Attorney and part of Operation Family Secrets prosecution team.

T. Markus Funk is an American attorney, law professor, and author known for the prosecution of several high-profile mob figures during his career at the United States Department of Justice, his role in co-leading the internal investigation into former Ohio State University team physician Dr. Richard Strauss, and trial victory on behalf of the Costa Rican citrus industry. He is currently a partner at White & Case LLP in their global litigation practice. He was previously a partner in the law firm of Perkins Coie, where he served as the Firmwide Chair of the firm's global White Collar & Investigations Practice.

== Education and early career ==
Funk was raised in Germany before attending school in Illinois. He graduated summa cum laude from the University of Illinois in 1992 and in 2023 received the university's alumni award. He went to Northwestern School of Law where he earned his J.D., graduating in 1995. He later received a Ph.D. (“DPhil”) in law from the University of Oxford.

Prior to his career at the Department of Justice, Funk taught law at the University of Oxford. He also served as a law clerk for Eighth Circuit Court of Appeals Judge Morris S. Arnold as well as U.S District Court Judge Catherine D. Perry.

== U.S. Department of State ==
Between 2004 and 2006, Funk worked for the U.S. Department of State as the Section Chief in Kosovo following the Kosovo War. He represented the U.S. at diplomatic negotiations and headed the restructuring of Kosovo's justice system after the war. He was given the Superior Honor Award by the department in recognition of his service in Kosovo and also authored the Kosovo Trial Skills Handbook which was published by the United States Department of Justice in 2006 and at the time was the Kosovo Supreme Court's most cited-to authority.

== U.S. Department of Justice ==
Funk worked for the United States Department of Justice under U.S. Attorney Patrick Fitzgerald for 10 years. During his time with the DOJ, he prosecuted numerous high-profile cases, including those of mobsters, white collar criminals, Roman Catholic priests and deacons, and company CEOs.

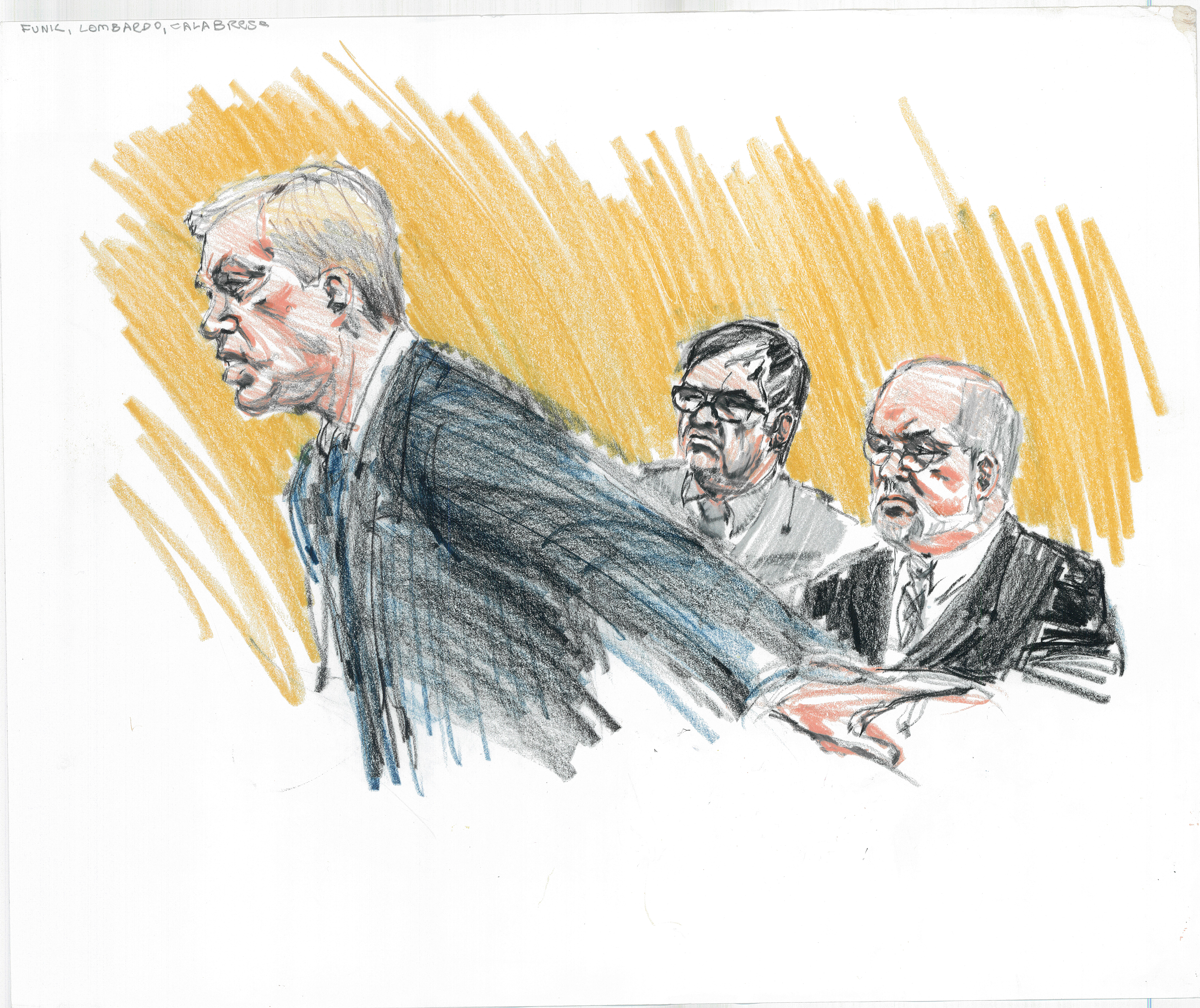
Sketch of T. Markus Funk (left) and Frank Calabrese Sr. (right) during the Family Secrets Trial.

As an Assistant United States Attorney, Funk also prosecuted Joey "The Clown" Lombardo, Frank Calabrese, Sr. and other high-ranking mobsters as part of Operation Family Secrets, an FBI investigation into 18 homicides and various other crimes committed by the Chicago Outfit between the 1960s and 2000s. The investigation was considered one of the most extensive racketeering cases of its kind and was labeled as one of the most important criminal investigations in American history by National Public Radio (the 1995 movie “Casino” was based on the charged criminal activities). During closing arguments of the trial, Calabrese told Funk, "You're a fucking dead man." Calabrese and all of his thirteen co-defendants were convicted.

Funk also prosecuted former U.S. Marshal John T Ambrose for leaking information to mob figures about the location of a protected witness. It was the first case of its type involving a U.S. Marshal violating the security of the Witness Protection Program. Ambrose was assigned to guard Nicholas Calabrese, the first "made" member to ever testify against the Chicago outfit. Ambrose was charged and later convicted with leaking information about Calabrese to other mob figures.

Funk also prosecuted mobsters Joseph Scalise, Arthur Rachel and Robert Pullia for their involvement in a conspiracy to rob cash from the First National Bank of La Grange in 2010. The three men, already famous for their 1980 involvement in the theft of the 45-carat Marlborough diamond from Graff's jewelry store, had planned to rob an armored vehicle at the bank and had stolen vehicles and stashed guns to use in the robbery. All three were convicted.

At the time of his departure from the U.S. Department of Justice, the Chicago Sun-Times described Markus as a "street-smart prosecutor with an Oxford pedigree."

== Private practice ==
Funk left the Department of Justice in 2010 to become a partner at the law firm of Perkins Coie. There, he specialized in internal investigations, complex commercial litigation, and white collar criminal defense, and in 2011 co-founded the firm's corporate social responsibility and supply chain compliance practice. He served as the Firmwide Chair of the Firm's White Collar & Investigations Practice from 2015 to 2021. He also co-led the internal investigation into former Ohio State University team physician Dr. Richard Strauss, and along with his team achieved trial victory on behalf of the Costa Rican citrus industry. In 2025, he joined White & Case LLP's global litigation practice in Chicago as partner.

== Teaching and writing career ==
In addition to teaching at the University of Oxford, Funk has taught law at the University of Chicago Law School, Northwestern School of Law, Loyola, University of Denver School of Law, and the University of Arkansas Little Rock. He currently co-teaches a class on bribery and forced labor in company supply chains at the University of Colorado School of Law.

Throughout his career, Funk has authored over 100 scholarly articles, updates, and book chapters and has written nine books.

=== Bibliography ===
- 2021, Rethinking Self-Defence: The 'Ancient Right's' Rationale Disentangled[FTM(1], Bloomsbury/Hart Publishing
- 2019, From Baksheesh to Bribery: Understanding the Global Right Against Corruption and Graft, Oxford University Press
- 2016, The ABA Compliance Officer Deskbook, The American Bar Association
- 2014, Mutual Legal Assistance Treaties and Letters Rogatory: A Guide for Judges, Federal Judicial Center
- 2012, Child Exploitation and Trafficking: Examining the Global Challenges and U.S. Responses, Rowman & Littlefield, (Second Updated and Expanded Edition, 2016)
- 2012, The Haiti Trial Skills Manual, American Bar Association
- 2010, The Darfur Trial Skills Manual, American Bar Association
- 2010, Victims' Rights and Advocacy at the International Criminal Court, Oxford University Press, (Second Updated and Expanded Edition, 2015)
- 2006, The Kosovo Trial Skills Handbook, United States Department of Justice

== Awards and recognition ==
Funk has been the recipient of numerous awards and recognition throughout his career. A Fellow of the American Law Institute, he was given the Attorney General's Award (John Marshall Award) for his work on Operation Family Secret and the 2018 Burton Award for Distinguished Legal Writing. He is the only person to have received both the Department of Justice's Attorney General's Award and the U.S. Department of State's Superior Honor Award. In 2013, he was named Lawyer of the Year by Law Week Colorado, and in 2012 he was named Colorado's top Corporate/Compliance Lawyer. In 2014, the ABA awarded Funk the Frank Carrington Crime Victim Award (given to the person or organization who has done the most for victims of crime), and in 2023 he received the University of Illinois Distinguished Alumnus award and was inducted into the Bloomington High School Hall of Fame.

== See also ==
- Operation Family Secrets
- Chicago Outfit
