= Peter DiFronzo =

American mobster (1933–2020)

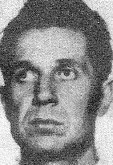
- Born: May 13, 1933
- Died: December 4, 2020 (aged 87); South Barrington, Illinois, U.S.
- Occupation: Mobster
- Spouse: Josephine DiFronzo
- Relatives: John DiFronzo (brother)
- Allegiance: Chicago Outfit
- Conviction: Robbery (1965)
- Penalty: 10 years' imprisonment

Peter DiFronzo (May 13, 1933 – December 4, 2020) was an American mobster in the Chicago Outfit.

== Life ==
DiFronzo was a made member and the caporegime of the Elmwood Park Crew within the Chicago Outfit. In 1965, he was sentenced to 10 years at Leavenworth Prison after he and two Outfit affiliates robbed a warehouse in Forest View, Illinois, of cigarettes, razor blades, and ladies' hosiery. He was featured in William F. Roemer Jr's War of the Godfathers: The Bloody Confrontation Between the Chicago and New York Families for Control of Las Vegas in 1990.

His wife, Josephine, was part owner of D&P Trucking, located in Chicago, Illinois, though authorities believe it was DiFronzo and his brothers Joe and John that actually ran the enterprise. DiFronzo was also supposedly active in some of the Outfit's racketeering schemes. DiFronzo's name appeared on a 2002 FBI list as a potential threat to the life of Nick Calabrese, a star witness in Operation Family Secrets under federal protection.

On December 4, 2020, DiFronzo died at the age of 87, in North Barrington, Illinois, from pneumonia caused by hypertension and COVID-19, amidst the pandemic in Illinois.
