= James LaPietra =

James "Jimmy the Lapper" LaPietra (March 28, 1927 – September 9, 1993) was an American mobster and made member of the Chicago Outfit. He was the younger brother of longtime 26th Street crew boss Angelo "The Hook" LaPietra and a key figure in the crew's operations on Chicago's South Side.

== Criminal career ==
A minor organized crime figure who had prior arrests for burglary and rape, LaPietra was involved in labor racketeering and other criminal activities in Chicago's South Side for the 26th Street crew. In April 1985, LaPietra was named by Stephen O'Mallory, a staff attorney for the President's Commission on Organized Crime, as a member of the Chicago Outfit. This accusation was based on testimony from labor union official John Serpico during federal hearings on labor racketeering.

LaPietra was present at the June 1986 murders of brothers Anthony and Michael Spilotro in a Bensenville basement. According to later testimony by Outfit turncoat Nicholas Calabrese in the 2007 Family Secrets trial, LaPietra was one of the high-ranking members waiting in the basement when the Spilotro brothers were lured there under the pretense of a "making" ceremony for Michael.

When Angelo LaPietra was imprisoned in 1986, James reportedly assumed the role of caporegime, overseeing the crew’s operations until his own death.

== Death ==
LaPietra died on September 9, 1993, in Berwyn, Illinois, at age 66. He is buried at Queen of Heaven Cemetery in Hillside, Illinois. His passing, along with his brother's incarceration, contributed to the eventual shift of crew leadership to John "Johnny Apes" Monteleone in the 1990s.
