= Carlisi =

Carlisi is a surname. Notable people with the surname include:

- Olimpia Carlisi (born 1946), Italian stage, film, and television actress
- Samuel Carlisi (1914–1997), American mobster

== See also ==
- Guido Carlesi (born 1936), Italian cyclist
