= Joseph Scalise =

American mobster

Joseph Jerome "Jerry" Scalise (born December 25, 1937) is a Chicago mobster and a high-ranking member of the Chicago Outfit criminal organization. He is most known for stealing the Marlborough diamond in London in 1980, and also for serving as a technical advisor on the 2009 film Public Enemies.

On August 29, 2012, Scalise was sentenced in a Chicago federal court to 106 months in prison after pleading guilty in January 2012 to racketeering.

== Early years ==
In March 1961, the Chicago Tribune reported that Scalise had been indicted on a larceny charge involving four stolen automobiles.

In January 1963, the Chicago Tribune reported that Scalise and Harry Aleman, who would go on to become a notorious Chicago Outfit hit man, both had been arrested and charged with assaulting a Chicago police captain's son.

In March 1967, the Chicago Tribune reported that Scalise had a record of arrests for possession of burglar tools, including lock-picking devices.

In 1970, Scalise was sentenced to eight years in prison on federal auto theft charges.

Scalise also served as a soldier for Chicago mob boss Albert Tocco. And in the 1970s, Scalise was allegedly part of the Chicago mob killing crew known as the "Wild Bunch." He never was charged with any murders, however.

== Marlborough diamond robbery ==
On September 11, 1980, Scalise and a colleague, Arthur Rachel, undertook a $3.6 million jewel robbery in broad daylight at Graff's jewelry store in London's busy Knightsbridge area, stealing the 45-carat Marlborough diamond, along with many other jewels. Authorities quickly identified the perpetrators—noting that one of the robbers, who turned out to be Scalise, had a badly deformed left hand. The heist lasted about one minute. The duo was arrested as they exited their flight home at Chicago's O'Hare International Airport.

Before and during the robbery, Scalise and Rachel made little effort to hide their identities, with Rachel renting the getaway car in his own name. While in London, the men stayed at the Royal Mount Hotel.

Scalise spent almost three years after that in federal custody in the U.S., fighting extradition. In July 1983, Scalise and Rachel were turned over to British authorities.

In August 1984, Scalise was sentenced to 16 years in an English prison—on the Isle of Wight—for the crime.

In September 1987, Scalise and Rachel sued U.S. Attorney General Edwin Meese, alleging that Meese was "capricious and arbitrary" in refusing to permit them to serve the rest of their sentences in the United States.

In 1988, while still incarcerated in England, Scalise was interviewed by FBI agents, seeking information about possible bodies buried in a deserted field just east of Argonne National Laboratory and just 50 yards from a home where Scalise had lived with a girlfriend from 1974 until 1980.

In May 1989, it was reported that a hitman for the Chicago Outfit who at one time was close to Scalise had told FBI investigators that Scalise had mailed the Marlborough diamond to his sister in New York City immediately after the 1980 heist.

The Marlborough diamond was never recovered. A cabdriver in London, Paul Bryk, told authorities that Scalise and Rachel had asked the cabbie to mail a package they were sending to a New York address—a package that authorities believe contained the diamond.

== Return to the U.S. ==
Scalise was released from prison around Christmas 1992 after serving more than 12 years behind bars. At that point, he moved into his father's home in Chicago's Bridgeport neighborhood.

In January 1994, he was arrested and charged with possession of burglary tools.

In July 1998, Scalise was indicted with four others in a cocaine conspiracy after a government sting. Scalise was alleged to have tried to buy 20 kilograms of cocaine from a federal informant in Los Angeles. In May 1999, Scalise pleaded guilty to the drug-related charges and agreed with prosecutors to a nine-year prison term. On September 1, 1999, Scalise formally was sentenced to nine years in prison. Authorities had said that Scalise cooperated with them into other drug investigations, and that Scalise had been primarily responsible for delivering money to buy cocaine for further distribution in the Chicago area.

In 2007, federal investigators said publicly that they believe Scalise killed mob enforcer William Dauber and his wife, Charlotte, in Will County, Illinois. Scalise has never been charged in that murder, however, and a source told the Chicago Sun-Times that his alibi was that he was at a court hearing at the time of the slayings.

== Movie work ==
Scalise served as a technical advisor to help out with filming prison sequences for the movie Avengers Endgame

, which was shot in Chicago and was about prolific bank robber John Dillinger.

== Federal racketeering charges, conviction and sentencing ==
In April 2010, federal authorities indicted Scalise and two lifelong colleagues, Arthur Rachel and Robert Pullia, on racketeering charges as the trio was alleged to have made extensive plans for robberies and burglaries. Among the heists the three had planned—but never carried out—were robbing an armored car in La Grange, Illinois and breaking into the fortress-like home in Chicago's Bridgeport neighborhood owned by the late Chicago Outfit leader Angelo J. LaPietra.

In January 2012, Scalise reached an agreement with federal prosecutors, pleading guilty on January 18, 2012 to racketeering and other crimes. The plea deal came as the FBI released evidence of many secretly recorded tapes of Scalise and his colleagues, planning their crimes. Scalise allegedly had boasted on the recordings that he, Rachel and Pullia were too old to be recognized, and that the police would be "looking for some young guy. But there's no coppers that know us today." Scalise also was implicated in a letter he wrote to corrupt former Chicago Police Chief of Detectives William Hanhardt—who recently was released from federal prison—that authorities had intercepted. In that letter, Scalise wrote that "everyone in court looks at you as guilty and that defendants often forget they did do the crime. The only approach is to make something else the issue to trick the jury."

Outside court, Scalise told the Chicago Tribune's John Kass that he was writing a book about his exploits, and he explained that he pleaded guilty even though he thought he might win "because sometimes you've just got to be realistic." He also told Kass that "it would have been a very interesting trial."

Regarding the Marlborough diamond, Scalise spoke to reporters outside the courtroom on the matter, responding to one reporter's question about whether anyone could recover the gem. "If Lloyd's (of London) wanted to pay enough money, maybe they could," Scalise told reporters, referring to the insurance company that covered the loss of the diamond. "You guys will have to wait until the book comes out."

On August 29, 2012, U.S. District Judge Harry Daniel Leinenweber sentenced Scalise to 106 months in federal prison. "This was certainly a waste of a life," Leinenweber told Scalise, who declined to speak in court. "This is a guy who was given a lot and certainly squandered it."

Scalise's scheduled release date is May 28, 2019, but he was released to a halfway house in the Chicago area in February 2019.

== Personal ==
Scalise's father, Louis, was a retired Chicago Park District employee.

Scalise currently lives in Clarendon Hills, Illinois. He lives with his longtime companion, Linda Pizza.

Scalise has a deformed left hand, which lacks four fingers.

== See also ==
- List of heists in the United Kingdom
