= Joseph Konopka =

American hacker and domestic terrorist (born 1976)

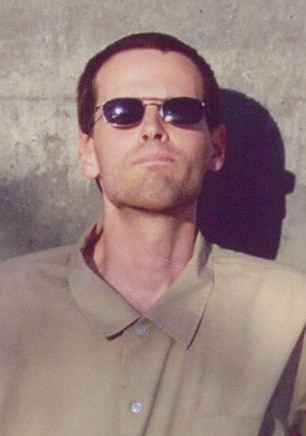
- Konopka in 2011
- Born: June 24, 1976 (age 50); De Pere, Wisconsin, U.S.
- Other names: Dr. Ch@os; Dr. Chaos
- Occupation: Computer system administrator
- Status: Released
- Convictions: Possessing chemical weapons (18 U.S.C. § 229) (2 counts) Six counts of arson, vandalism, and trespassing
- Penalty: 20 years imprisonment

Joseph Konopka (born June 24, 1976), better known by his self-invented alias Dr. Ch@os (typically spelled Dr. Chaos by the media), is an American citizen who served 16 years of a 20-year prison sentence for arson, vandalism, and possessing chemical weapons. In 2003 in Illinois, he pleaded guilty to chemical weapons possession for storing cyanide in a disused Chicago subway storage room and was sentenced to 13 years.

In 2004, he pleaded guilty to six felony counts of arson and vandalism, as well as trespassing, and was sentenced to 21 years. These convictions were later overturned on a federal appeal. Konopka pleaded guilty again and was sentenced to an additional seven years.

== Life prior to arrest ==
Konopka was born in 1976 in De Pere, Wisconsin. He did not graduate from high school, but later earned a GED.

A former computer systems administrator, Konopka used the Internet to recruit a group of adolescent disciples he called the "Realm of Ch@os". This group was responsible for 28 power failures and 20 other service interruptions at Wisconsin power plants. They also committed arson, disrupted radio and television broadcasts, disabled an air traffic control system, sold bootlegged software, and damaged the computer systems of Internet service providers.

Prosecutors established that Konopka and his group caused more than 50 acts of destruction in various Wisconsin counties which affected more than 30,000 power customers and caused more than $800,000 in damage.

Konopka was briefly associated with the Chicago chapter of 2600, a hacker group who publish a magazine of the same name, and hold gatherings and an annual national conference. The FBI visited the April 2002 meeting of the Chicago chapter and questioned members about their knowledge of Konopka.

== Arrest ==
In 2002, Konopka, then 25, was arrested by the University of Illinois at Chicago police while trespassing in the steam tunnel system beneath the UIC east campus. The arresting officers found a small vial of white powder in Konopka's possession; tests indicated the powder was sodium cyanide. The subsequent investigation revealed that Konopka had been hoarding potassium cyanide and sodium cyanide in an unused Chicago Transit Authority storeroom in the Chicago 'L' Blue Line subway.

Konopka had picked the locks on several doors in the tunnels, then changed the locks so that he could access the unused rooms freely. Konopka had briefly associated with a Chicago-area urban exploration group in order to obtain information on how to access the large network of unused tunnels and abandoned rooms in Chicago's transit system as well as to lure juveniles to help him.

The cyanide had been stolen from a shuttered warehouse, formerly owned by a water treatment company at 48th and Halsted on Chicago's South Side. Konopka was also found in possession of numerous keys, which allowed him access to tunnels and rooms not just at the CTA, but also Metra, the Chicago wastewater treatment system, buildings at University of Illinois at Chicago and other city infrastructure buildings.

== Sentencing ==
On March 12, 2003, Konopka was sentenced to 13 years in prison for hiding cyanide in a Chicago subway tunnel. When asked by U.S. District Judge Wayne Andersen why he had gone on his vandalism spree, Konopka stated, "I have several reasons, but no real good reason." He said the only use he'd contemplated with the cyanide was killing himself, and that he was never planning on hurting anyone else.

Defense attorney Matthew Madden claimed Konopka's behavior "stems from an abnormal maturation process." He argued that normal adults "realize you can't participate in the destruction of property for your own entertainment — that's just not acceptable."

In 2004, Judge Lynn Adelman sentenced Konopka to 21 years in prison for conspiring to knock out power lines, burn buildings, and damage computers in Wisconsin. Konopka was also ordered to pay more than $435,000 in restitution to victims.

On June 1, 2005, a three-judge panel of the United States Court of Appeals for the Seventh Circuit, in Chicago, overturned the earlier arson and vandalism convictions, saying a federal judge should have let him withdraw his guilty plea before he was sentenced to 21 years in prison. Konopka pleaded guilty again and was sentenced to an additional seven years.

Konopka served the majority of his sentence at ADX Florence before being transferred to Chicago MCC just a few months before his release. He was then placed in the Chicago Residential Reentry Management Facility. He was released in 2019. In November of that year, Konopka was interviewed by WGN Investigates reporters, stated he would not resume his prior activities and expressed interest in pursuing white hat hacking as a career.
