= Frank Calabrese Sr. =

American gangster

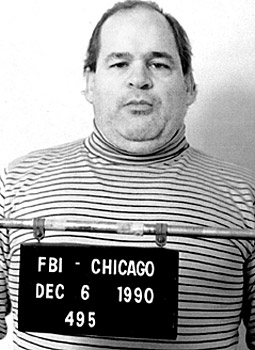
- Calabrese's December 6, 1990 FBI mugshot
- Born: March 17, 1937; Chicago, Illinois, U.S.
- Died: December 25, 2012 (aged 75); Butner, North Carolina, U.S.
- Other name: "Frankie Breeze"
- Spouse: Dolores (div. 1984)
- Children: 3
- Relatives: Nicholas Calabrese (brother)
- Allegiance: Chicago Outfit
- Convictions: Racketeering (1997); Racketeering, murder, extortion, and loansharking (2007)
- Penalty: 118 months' imprisonment and forfeit $750,000 (1997); Life imprisonment (2009)

Frank James Calabrese Sr. (March 17, 1937 – December 25, 2012), also known as "Frankie Breeze", was an American mobster who served as a "made man" in the Chicago Outfit, controlling major loansharking and illegal gambling operations. He is best known as a central figure in Operation Family Secrets and the subsequent federal trial. Calabrese, who was battling multiple ailments, died on Christmas Day 2012 at the Federal Medical Center, Butner, in North Carolina.

== Early life ==
Frank Calabrese Sr. was born in Chicago, Illinois, on March 17, 1937, to James and Sophie Calabrese. Calabrese grew up on the West Side of Chicago, dropped out of school in the fourth grade and sold newspapers on Grand Avenue, he told jurors during a trial in 2007. He also told jurors that his family was so poor that they would eat oatmeal for dinner. Calabrese enlisted in the U.S. Army, however, he went AWOL five days after boot camp.

== Criminal career ==
Calabrese's arrest record dates from 1954, when he served two years in prison for a violation of the Dyer Act (auto theft). He and his brother Nicholas were both inducted as "made" members of the Chicago Outfit during an induction ceremony conducted by Joey Aiuppa at a restaurant on Roosevelt Road on October 9, 1983. Calabrese was the Outfit's Chinatown, or 26th Street, crew boss who provided loans to hundreds of customers at exorbitant interest rates that varied from one percent to 10 percent per week. The federal government estimates that Calabrese's crew grossed more than $2,600,000. Calabrese instructed his crew members to, "do anything you have to do", to collect the loans. If a debtor did not have the money, the Calabrese crew would seize the debtor's car, home and business. Calabrese reported to Angelo "the Hook" LaPietra, who was the ultimate boss of the 26th Street Crew and founder of the Italian American Club from where operations were handled.

At one point, Calabrese gained control of an auto repair shop in River Grove, Illinois, when the owner, Matthew Russo, fell behind on a loan. In 1990, Calabrese entered an agreement with a car dealership in Elmhurst, Illinois, to direct car repair work to this mob-controlled repair shop in exchange for kickbacks. However, Russo had become an undercover government informant and recorded the mobsters at one meeting at the dealership. Calabrese and eight of his crew members—sons Frank Calabrese Jr. and Kurt Calabrese; brother Nick Calabrese, Louis Bombacino, Philip Tolomeo, Kevin Kudulis, Terry Scalise and Philip Fiore—were eventually arrested.

=== 1995 arrest and subsequent conviction ===
On July 28, 1995, the federal government indicted Frank Calabrese and nine other organized crime figures with using threats, violence and intimidation to enforce the loan sharking racket from 1978 until 1992. The other defendants were his brother Nick Calabrese, sons Frank Calabrese Jr. and Kurt Calabrese, Robert Dinella, Philip J. Fiore, Terry Scalise, Kevin Kudulis, Louis Bombacino and Philip Tolomeo.

On March 21, 1997, Calabrese and his sons pleaded guilty to the charges, just weeks before they were set to go to trial. "I'm very sad that this brings my kids into something that should never have happened", Calabrese told U.S. district judge James F. Holderman. On October 15, 1997, Calabrese was sentenced by Holderman to 118 months in federal prison and ordered to forfeit $750,000 in illicit profits. He apologized to the court and his family for, "all the trouble I have caused." Frank Jr. was sentenced to 57 months in prison and ordered to forfeit $150,000 in assets, and Kurt was sentenced to two years in prison and fined $5,000.

=== Operation Family Secrets trial ===
The investigation Operation Family Secrets began on July 27, 1998, when Frank Calabrese Jr. wrote a letter to the FBI saying he wanted help to put his father in jail. Frank Jr. agreed to wear a wire during conversations with his father as they talked about the family business.

On April 25, 2005, Frank Calabrese Sr. and several high-profile Chicago Outfit gangsters were charged with murder, racketeering, extortion, and running an illegal gambling business as part of the federal-government initiated "Operation Family Secrets" investigation.

After various plea agreements and the deaths of two defendants, ultimately four other defendants—Joseph Lombardo, James Marcello, Paul Schiro and Anthony Doyle—went to trial in June 2007. On September 10, 2007, Calabrese and other Outfit defendants were convicted of a racketeering conspiracy that included murder, extortion, and loansharking.

After the verdict, news came out that a juror had alleged that on August 27, 2007, Calabrese had said or mouthed, "You are a fucking dead man", to Prosecutor T. Markus Funk. On April 10, 2008, Judge James Zagel denied a request to order a new trial in the case, saying that he did not believe that the threat had tainted jurors. However, the threat resulted in Calabrese being placed in highly restrictive lockdown during his stay in the Metropolitan Correctional Center in Chicago while awaiting sentencing.

On January 28, 2009, Judge Zagel sentenced Calabrese, then 71, to life in prison for his crimes and called the acts he had committed, "unspeakable". On finding prosecutors had proven the murder allegations, the judge sentenced Calabrese for 13 slayings.

=== Later accusations ===
On June 8, 2011, Calabrese was indicted on charges of conspiracy to defraud the United States and attempting to prevent seizure of Calabrese's property. The charges were announced the next morning by the U.S. Attorney's Office in Chicago. Calabrese was accused of plotting with a former prison chaplain to recover a violin hidden in a Wisconsin house.

== Personal life and death ==
Calabrese and his first wife, Dolores, divorced in 1984. He had three children with her; Frank Jr., Kurt, Nick.

Calabrese resided in Oak Brook, Illinois, until his imprisonment in the mid-1990s.

Calabrese died at the age of 75, on December 25, 2012, at the Federal Medical Center, Butner, North Carolina. The Federal Bureau of Prisons did not release details for the cause of death.
