= Jesse Webster =

American prison inmate whose sentence was commuted by Barack Obama

- Born: 1969 (age 56–57); Chicago, Illinois
- Judicial status: Sentence commuted
- Criminal charges: Drug-related crime, tax fraud
- Penalty: Life without the possibility of parole

Jesse Webster (born in 1969) is an American former prison inmate who was sentenced to life without the possibility of parole for drug-related charges and tax fraud. He was featured in an ACLU report discussing life sentences for nonviolent offenses in 2013. His sentence was later commuted by President Barack Obama in 2016.

== History ==
A native of the South Side, Chicago, Illinois, Webster began a job at a local carwash as a teenager, first after school and on weekends, and then full-time. In 1985, one of Webster's customers, a drug dealer, offered him a job as a driver. Jesse accepted the job, and dropped out of school in 9th grade to become more involved in the drug trade. He met Archie West in 1985, and subsequently his associates Andre Mitchell, Sam Mitchell, Dino, Reginald Jones and Sherman Randolph. In 1992, West agreed to drive for Webster through 1995, and between 1992 and 1995, Websterand his associates distributed 200 to 300 kilograms of cocaine.

In August 1994, Webster helped arrange to purchase 25 kilograms of cocaine from a drug informant. The deal was abandoned without any drugs changing hands, but Webster discovered months later that he was wanted for questioning. Webster voluntarily turned himself in, and in September 1995 he was indicted. Webster was offered a plea deal if he agreed to work as an informant of a local gang, but Webster declined the offer, saying that he was concerned it would pose a risk to himself and his family. He entered a not guilty plea on September 13, 1995, and on November 30 he was found guilty on 4 counts, including attempt and conspiracy to possess cocaine with intent to distribute and filing false tax returns in 1992 and 1993. The decision was based on the testimony of Webster's co-defendants, who had agreed to plea deals in exchange for their testimony. It was Webster's first conviction, and he had no criminal record.

In 1996, Webster was sentenced to life without parole by Judge Zagel, which was the minimum mandatory sentence at the time. Zagel explained during sentencing that he felt the sentence was "too high". Webster entered a motion for a new trial on July 30, 1997, which was declined, and he appealed in 1998, but his sentence was affirmed.

Webster filed a petition in 2013 to commute his sentence, with letters of recommendation from his judge, James Zagel, and both his prosecutors. That same year, the American Civil Liberties Union (ACLU) published a report about federal inmates serving life sentences for non-violent offenses. Webster’s story was featured as an example, along with other inmates serving time under similar circumstances. Webster worked with his lawyer, Jessica Ring Amunson to get his sentence commuted by President Barack Obama. This goal was achieved on March 30, 2016, when Obama commuted Webster's sentence to expire on September 26 of that year.

== Prison life ==
Webster began counseling fellow inmates while in prison, and became a Captain's orderly. He was transferred from a high security prison in 2011, to a medium security institution in Greenville, Illinois. In Greenville he earned his GED, and began tutoring other inmates.

== Personal life ==
Webster has one daughter who, in 2013, was enrolled in a criminal justice program at Kennedy King College. He has one grandchild.
