= Steven C. Seeger =

American judge (born 1971)

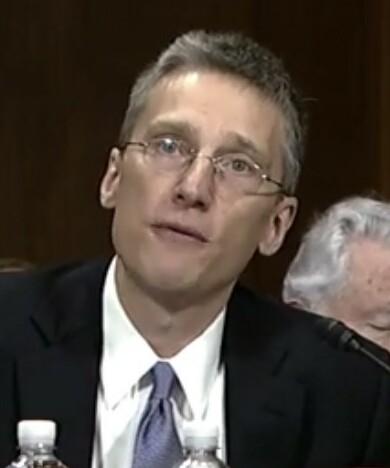
- Seeger in 2020

Judge of the United States District Court for the Northern District of Illinois
- Incumbent
- Assumed office September 13, 2019
- Appointed by: Donald Trump
- Preceded by: James Zagel

Personal details
- Born: Steven Charles Seeger; March 18, 1971 (age 55) Normal, Illinois, U.S.
- Spouse: Kristen Seeger
- Education: Wheaton College (BA); University of Michigan; Law School (JD)

Steven Charles Seeger (born March 18, 1971) is a United States district judge of the United States District Court for the Northern District of Illinois.

== Education ==
Seeger earned his Bachelor of Arts, summa cum laude, from Wheaton College in 1993 and his Juris Doctor, magna cum laude, from the University of Michigan Law School in 1997, where he was inducted into the Order of the Coif and served as both an associate and articles editor of the University of Michigan Law Review.

== Legal career ==
After graduation from law school he served as a law clerk to Judge David B. Sentelle of the United States Court of Appeals for the District of Columbia Circuit. After his clerkship Seeger joined the Chicago, Illinois, office of Kirkland & Ellis in 1998, where he spent his last seven years as a partner. From 2010 to 2019, Seeger served as Senior Trial Counsel in the Chicago Regional Office of the United States Securities and Exchange Commission, where he litigated cases to enforce federal securities laws on behalf of the public.

== Federal judicial service ==
On June 7, 2018, President Donald Trump announced his intent to nominate Seeger to serve as a United States district judge for the United States District Court for the Northern District of Illinois. On June 18, 2018, his nomination was sent to the Senate. President Trump nominated Seeger to the seat vacated by Judge James Zagel, who assumed senior status on October 21, 2016. On August 22, 2018, a hearing on his nomination was held before the Senate Judiciary Committee. On October 11, 2018, his nomination was reported out of committee by a voice vote.

On January 3, 2019, his nomination was returned to the President under Rule XXXI, Paragraph 6 of the United States Senate. On April 8, 2019, President Trump announced the renomination of Seeger to the district court. On May 21, 2019, his nomination was sent to the Senate. On June 20, 2019, his nomination was reported out of committee by a 19–3 vote. On July 30, 2019, the Senate invoked cloture on his nomination by an 87–1 vote. On September 11, 2019, his nomination was confirmed by a 90–1 vote. He received his judicial commission on September 13, 2019. He was sworn in on September 16, 2019.

Legal offices
Preceded by James Zagel	Judge of the United States District Court for the Northern District of Illinois; 2019–present	Incumbent
