= John DiFronzo =

American gangster

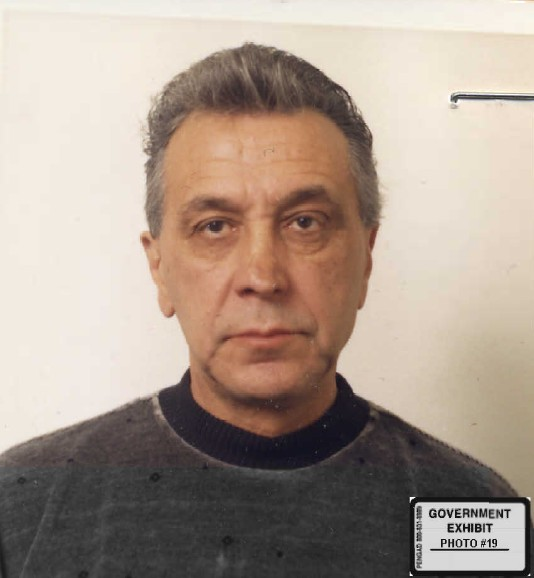
- Born: December 13, 1928; Italy
- Died: May 27, 2018 (aged 89); River Grove, Illinois, U.S.
- Other names: "Johnny Bananas"; "No Nose"
- Occupation: Crime boss
- Relatives: Peter DiFronzo and Joseph DiFronzo (brothers)
- Allegiance: Chicago Outfit

John DiFronzo (December 13, 1928 – May 27, 2018), nicknamed "No Nose", was an Italian-American mobster and the reputed former boss of the Chicago Outfit.

== Early life ==
DiFronzo was born in Italy and immigrated to the United States with his family in the mid-1930s, settling in Chicago, where he attended Wells High School on the city's Near North Side.

== Criminal career ==
DiFronzo was a member of the Three Minute Gang, a group of criminals known for their ability to burglarize stores within three minutes, the average time it took for police to respond to a burglar alarm. He was first arrested for burglary in 1946 and placed under court supervision for six months. In 1949, he and an associate were arrested and charged with a robbery on Chicago's Gold Coast. DiFronzo was given the nickname "No Nose" after he sliced off part of his nose while jumping through a window during a burglary of the Fey-Manning dress shop at 304 North Michigan Avenue in Chicago in December 1949. Reportedly, the police gave him back the missing part, which was almost perfectly restored. In April 1950, DiFronzo was sentenced to six months in Cook County Jail on a charge of assault with a deadly weapon related to the dress shop burglary.

DiFronzo was a suspect in the unsolved 1952 murder of Charles Gross, a West Side politician with suspected ties to organized crime. He was a member of the Three Minute Gang and identified as a member of a loansharking operation along with former Chicago police officers Albert Sarno and Chris Cardi in 1964. Imprisoned syndicate leader Joseph Aiuppa chose DiFronzo to head criminal operations in Chicago's western suburbs over acting syndicate boss Joseph Ferriola. Eventually, he became one of several de facto leaders running the Outfit in Chicago.

His brother, Peter DiFronzo, a "made man", was convicted of warehouse burglary in 1963.

In 1993, DiFronzo was convicted along with Chicago boss Samuel "Black Sam" Carlisi, his gambling capo Donald "The Wizard of Odds" Angelini, and four other men of federal racketeering charges for attempting to subterfuge gambling operations at the Rincon Reservation near San Diego. The 1993 conviction was reversed on appeal, however, and DiFronzo was released from prison in 1994.

In 2009, DiFronzo, Rudy Fratto and several others were named in a civil lawsuit by Joseph Fosco (the son of late Teamsters treasurer Armando Fosco) alleging that they attempted to extort $400,000 from Fosco.

== Death ==
DiFronzo died from complications of Alzheimer's disease on May 27, 2018.

American Mafia
Preceded by Samuel Carlisi	Chicago Outfit Boss; 1993–2018	Succeeded by Salvatore DeLaurentis
