= Operation Family Secrets =

Investigation by the FBI into mob-related crimes in Chicago

Operation Family Secrets was an investigation by the Federal Bureau of Investigation (FBI) into mob-related crimes in Chicago. The FBI called it one of the most successful investigations of organized crime that it had ever conducted.

The investigation and trial was accurately dubbed "Family Secrets" because of the betrayal from within the Calabrese family. The son, Frank Calabrese Jr., and brother, Nick Calabrese, of Chicago Outfit mob hitman Frank Calabrese Sr. provided testimony that was instrumental to the success of Operation Family Secrets. The investigation led to indictments of 14 defendants who were affiliated with the Chicago Outfit, which has been one of the most prolific organized crime enterprises in the United States.

The most heinous of their crimes investigated were 18 murders and one attempted murder between 1970 and 1986. All of the murders and the other crimes charged to the defendants were allegedly committed to further the Outfit's illegal activities, such as loansharking and bookmaking, and protecting the enterprise from law enforcement. The trial took place between June and August 2007, and sentencing occurred in 2009.

Operation Family Secrets was a milestone in the FBI's battle against organized crime in Chicago. It is said to have had a significant effect on the operations of the Chicago Outfit. However, it did not end the Outfit's reign in Chicago.

== Murders ==
The following list is of the murders committed as objectives of the Chicago Outfit that were investigated in Operation Family Secrets:

Date of Murder	Killer(s)	Victim(s)	Location of Murder
August, 1970	Frank Calabrese Sr.	Michael "Hambone" Albergo	Chicago, Illinois
September 27, 1974	Joseph Lombardo and Frank Schweihs	Daniel Siefert	Bensenville, Illinois
June 24, 1976	Frank Calabrese Sr.	Paul Haggerty	Chicago, Illinois
March 15, 1977	Frank Calabrese Sr.	Henry Cosentino	Chicago, Illinois
January 16, 1978	Frank Calabrese Sr.	John Mendell	Chicago, Illinois
January 31, 1978	Frank Calabrese Sr.	Donald Renno and Vincent Moretti	Cicero, Illinois
July 2, 1980	Frank Calabrese Sr.	William Dauber and Charlotte Dauber	Will County, Illinois
December 30, 1980	Frank Calabrese Sr.	William Petrocelli	Cicero, Illinois
June 24, 1981	Frank Calabrese Sr.	Michael Cagnoni	DuPage County, Illinois
September 13, 1981	James Marcello	Nicholas D'Andrea	Chicago Heights, Illinois
April 24, 1982	James Marcello and Frank Calabrese Sr.	Individual A (attempted murder)	Lake County, Illinois
July 23, 1983	Frank Calabrese Sr.	Richard D. Ortiz and Arthur Morawski	Cicero, Illinois
June 6, 1986	Frank Schweihs and Paul Schiro	Emil Vaci	Phoenix, Arizona
June 14, 1986	James Marcello	Anthony Spilotro and Michael Spilotro	Bensenville, Illinois
September 14, 1986	Nicholas Calabrese and Frank Calabrese Sr.	John Fecarotta	Chicago, Illinois

== Investigation ==
=== Frank Jr.'s letter to FBI ===
The investigation began on July 27, 1998 when Frank Calabrese Jr., wrote a letter to the FBI saying he wanted help to put his father in jail. The letter was sent without warning from the federal correctional facility in Milan, Michigan, where both Frank Jr. and Frank Sr. had been incarcerated since 1995, when four members of the Calabrese family had been sentenced for collecting "juice loans" and racketeering an auto repair business. In the letter, Frank Jr. requested a face-to-face meeting in which he planned to give the FBI information about his father's crimes, business activities of the Chicago Outfit street crews, and the murder of John Fecarotta: "This is no game. I feel I have to help keep this sick man locked up forever."

He and his father had had rough patches in their relationship over the years. He had stolen hundreds of thousands of dollars in cash from his father, which he blew on a cocaine addiction and bad business decisions. Afterward, his father allegedly put a gun to his son's head and threatened to kill him. That and many other instances of Frank Sr.'s abuse and poor fathering contributed to Frank Jr.'s desire to help the FBI bring him down. He volunteered to record conversations that he had with his father while they were imprisoned. He wore a pair of headphones around his neck fit by the FBI with a hidden microphone to record conversations between the father and son.

It was not difficult for Frank Jr. to direct his conversations in the prison courtyard and recreational facilities with his father toward information that would benefit the FBI's rapidly assembling investigation. Frank Sr. bragged to his son about past criminal activities.

=== Nick's co-operation with federal agents ===
Federal agents Michael Maseth, Tom Bourgeois, and Michael Hartnett were assigned to the investigation. They began to put together pieces of information on the Fecarotta murder. Newspapers reported that Calabrese had been confronted with DNA evidence implicating him in the 1986 mob hit of mob enforcer Fecarotta, prompting Nick Calabrese to cooperate with law enforcement in the probe.

Frank Jr. agreed to wear a wire during conversations with his father as they talked about the family business.

== Trial ==
The FBI, in April 2005, turned in a 43-page indictment that was created by the "Family Secrets" investigation. "Family Secrets" was unprecedented for naming the entire Chicago Outfit as a criminal enterprise. Assistant US Attorneys Mitchell Mars, John Scully, and T. Markus Funk would represent the United States in the case. After more than two years, the trial began in June 2007. Judge James Zagel heard the case.

The evidence was presented between June and August 2007. The trial included testimony from more than 125 witnesses and over 200 pieces of evidence. For Calabrese Sr., James Marcello, Joseph "The Clown" Lombardo, Paul "The Indian" Schiro, and Anthony "Twan" Doyle, who were the five main defendants, the trial ended on August 30.

All five men were found guilty on all counts for conspiracy and criminal acts of racketeering. Of the other nine defendants, six pleaded guilty, two died before trial (Frank Saladino and Michael Ricci), and one (Frank "The German" Schweihs [sic]) was too ill to stand trial.

=== Sentencing ===
On September 10, 2007, the five men were convicted of racketeering, extortion, loan sharking and murder. On September 27, 2007, the same jury found Lombardo guilty of the 1974 Seifert murder. In 2009, Lombardo, seated in a wheelchair, was sentenced to life in prison for the convictions.

On February 5, 2009, Marcello was sentenced to life imprisonment for the Spilotro murders. Judge Zagel agreed with federal prosecutor Markus Funk presentation that Marcello was also responsible for the D'Andrea murder as well, even though the jury had deadlocked on that count.

On January 28, 2009, Judge Zagel sentenced Frank Calabrese, then 71, to life in prison for his crimes, calling the acts he had committed "unspeakable". On finding prosecutors had proven the murder allegations, the judge sentenced Calabrese for 13 slayings. Calabrese died at the age of 75, on December 25, 2012, at the Federal Medical Center, Butner, North Carolina.

On March 26, 2009, Nick Calabrese was sentenced to 12 years and 4 months in prison. Upon sentencing Calabrese, Zagel told him, "I think what you did does make amends by allowing penalties to be paid for the murders of others and for allowing families to know how and why their [loved ones] died." Calabrese had said, "I can't go back and undo what I done ... I stand before you a different man, a changed man." Zagel expressed doubts Calabrese will ever truly be a free man again, telling him, "The organization whose existence you testified to will not forgive or relent in their pursuit of you."
