= Samuel Carlisi =

American crime boss (1914-1997)

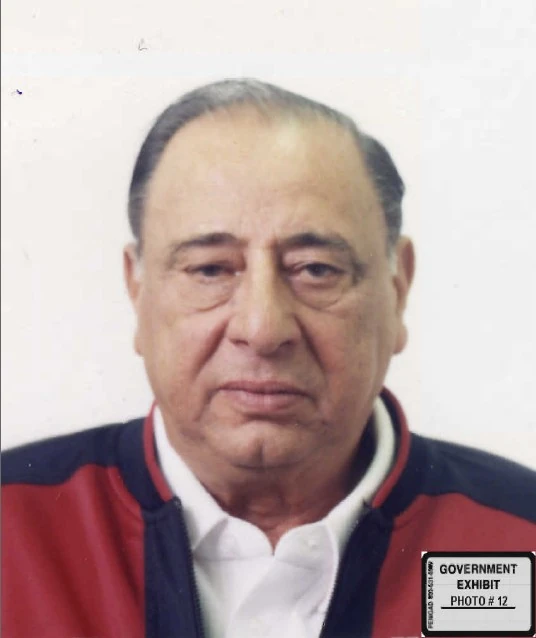
- An undated government mugshot of Carlisi
- Born: Samuel A. Carlisi; December 15, 1921; Buffalo, New York, U.S.
- Died: January 1, 1997 (aged 75); Dade County, Florida, U.S.
- Other names: "Black Sam"; "Sam Wings"
- Occupation: Crime boss
- Predecessor: Joseph Ferriola
- Successor: John DiFronzo
- Allegiance: Chicago Outfit
- Conviction: Racketeering (1993)
- Penalty: 13 years' imprisonment (1993)

Samuel A. Carlisi (December 15, 1921 – January 2, 1997), also known as "Black Sam" and "Sam Wings", was an American mobster who was the boss of the Chicago Outfit criminal organization between 1989 and 1996. Hillel Levin of Chicago magazine assessed Carlisi as a "weak leader" who led the Outfit only due to a lack of alternative candidates for the position. Carlisi died in prison after being sentenced to 13 years' incarceration for racketeering in 1996.

== Biography ==
Carlisi was born in Buffalo, New York. His brother, Rosario "Roy" Carlisi, was a caporegime in the Buffalo crime family who was close to Buffalo Mafia boss Stefano Magaddino, which gave Sam Carlisi direct access to various East Coast crime families that were aligned with the Buffalo Mafia, such as those based in Rochester and Utica, New York and in Northeastern Pennsylvania. Carlisi used these connections to further his gambling and bookmaking interests, fence stolen goods, and possibly for narcotics operations he was overseeing or involved in. He was also a cousin of Chicago Outfit mobster Alfonso "Al the Pizza Man" Tornabene, and the uncle to Outfit mobsters Dominick and Nicholas DiMaggio. Carlisi served as a gunner's mate in the United States Coast Guard during World War II. He was later a resident of Bloomingdale, Illinois.

Carlisi started his criminal career with the Outfit as a driver for mobster Joseph "Joey Doves" Aiuppa when he was boss of the Cicero, Illinois crew. He earned his nickname "Wings" for his ability to elude police cars and efficiently chauffeur fellow mobsters around Chicago. Carlisi became a "crew chief" overseeing the Outfit's rackets on the West Side of Chicago. When Aiuppa was convicted in 1986 for the skimming of the Las Vegas casinos, Carlisi was his replacement and frontman. When Joseph Ferriola became the Outfit's boss, Carlisi served as his underboss. This followed the murders of Michael and Tony Spilotro, in which Carlisi had allegedly been involved.

=== Outfit boss ===
After Ferriola was diagnosed with cancer, he assigned the day-to-day supervision of the Outfit to Carlisi. After Ferriola died, Carlisi became the new boss. In December 1990, Carlisi bought a 2,500-square-foot home in the Tequesta Pointe neighborhood of Weston, Florida, where he lived in a home that was listed in the name of his wife, Suzanne. Then, in January 1991, he reportedly went into semi-retirement in South Florida. On January 10, 1992, Carlisi was arrested by agents of the Federal Bureau of Investigation (FBI), the Florida Department of Law Enforcement, and the Broward County Sheriff's Office Organized Crime Division at his home in Weston. He was one of ten men named in a 15-count federal indictment alleging that he had approved a failed attempt by the Outfit to take over the management of a legal Rincon Indian gambling hall near San Diego, California. The FBI in San Diego had built the case via wiretap recordings from dozens of locations. Carlisi's trial ended in a hung jury, although eight others were convicted in the case.

On December 15, 1992, Carlisi was arrested by the FBI on various charges at O'Hare International Airport in Chicago as he boarded a flight to Fort Lauderdale, Florida. He was denied bail as he was deemed by a judge to be a flight risk. Following a lengthy trial, Carlisi and several underlings were convicted in December 1993 of mob racketeering, loansharking, and arson in connection with an illegal gambling business in the Chicago area and the West suburbs. Convicted with Carlisi were his chauffeur James "Little Jimmy" Marcello, Anthony Zizzo, and Anthony Chiaramonti. He was found to have ordered the thwarted murder of Outfit associate Anthony Daddino over concerns that Daddino may cooperate with authorities. He also ordered another associate, Lenny Patrick, to the carry out an attempted bombing on the Lake Theater, a movie theatre in Oak Park, Illinois during a union dispute. The attack failed when grenades thrown at the building did not detonate. Carlisi's sentencing was repeatedly delayed due to ill-health. Following his conviction, he underwent three major surgeries, including one for an aneurysm in his aorta, and also suffered from kidney problems. On March 18, 1996, Carlisi was sentenced to almost 13 years in prison. He also paid $125,000 to the government in restitution.

Carlisi began serving his sentence at the Federal Correctional Institution, Miami, Florida although he appealed his conviction and was due to appear at an appeal hearing in an Illinois federal court on January 17, 1997. On December 31, 1996, Carlisi was moved from a federal jail cell in Miami to a Dade County hospital after he complained of chest pains. He died of heart disease in the early hours of January 1, 1997 at the age of 75.

American Mafia
Preceded by Joseph Ferriola	Chicago Outfit Boss; 1989–1993	Succeeded by John DiFronzo
