= Armando Fosco =

American mobster (1922-1987)

Armando Fosco Sr.
- Born: July 13, 1922
- Died: February 5, 1987 (aged 64)
- Other names: Mondo, Mondie
- Occupations: International Brotherhood of Teamsters Labor Leader, reputed Chicago Outfit member
- Spouse: Gloria M. Nappi (deceased)
- Partner: Sharon Salvo
- Children: 4

Armando Fosco Sr. (July 13, 1922 – February 5, 1987) was the American Secretary-Treasurer of Local 738 of the International Brotherhood of Teamsters.

According to FBI documents, the government believed Armando was a member of the Chicago Outfit. FBI Agents observed Armando working with Outfit heavyweight Ross Prio. His wife, Gloria M. Nappi, was a blood relation to Outfit political fixer Romie J. Nappi.

In 2009, Armando's son, Joseph Fosco, named Armando in a first of its kind civil RICO lawsuit against a mafia group. Armando was identified in the lawsuit as a suspected embezzler who failed to make a kickback payment to the Chicago Outfit. According to the complaint, it was alleged that members of the Chicago Outfit, including Outfit boss John DiFronzo, schemed to extort money from the Fosco family, as if the family was in possession of said ill-gotten gains alleged to have been skimmed from the International Brotherhood of Teamsters. The case was ultimately dismissed for statute of limitations issues.
