= William Dauber =

American mobster (1935–1980)

William E. "Billy" Dauber (June 30, 1935 – July 2, 1980) was a Chicago mobster, hitman and associate in the Chicago Outfit's South Side chop shop ring.

Born in Chicago and moved to Blue Island, Dauber was brought into the Chicago crime syndicate by mobster James "Jimmy the Bomber" Catuara, who operated illegal gambling and vice in Chicago's Southside. One of only a few southerners within the syndicate, Dauber quickly proved to be a valuable member of "The Outfit." As Catuara's protégé, Dauber was suspected in over 20 unsolved homicides, between 1969 and 1980, in the decade-long struggle for Steven Ostrowski's lucrative South Side chop shop operation.

In 1973, Dauber was convicted of mail fraud and the interstate transportation of a stolen car used in an unsolved murder. After his release in 1976, Dauber joined rival mobster Albert "Caesar" Tocco as a top enforcer who had slowly gained control of the Southside. Shortly after Dauber's defection, Catuara was found shot to death in his red Cadillac on July 28, 1978.

During the next several years, relations between Dauber and his former associates would become increasingly strained, as voiced by his wife Charlotte. He reportedly was becoming disgruntled over his treatment as well as his facing several federal indictments for which others may have come to suspect Dauber had agreed to become an informant. It was also well known that Dauber was a "hot-head" and believed he should have had more power in the rackets he was involved in. He was suspected of running several "competing" rackets that were not sanctioned by The Outfit and for which he did not "kick up" for.

On July 2, 1980, the Daubers received a continuation from Judge Angelo Pistilli on charges accusing the couple of concealing cocaine and weapons in their suburban residence. While leaving the Will County courthouse, Dauber answered to reporters regarding his criminal activities, "I just live quietly in this country, that's all."

While driving home from the courthouse, unidentified gunmen (in the Family Secrets case it was said that the hitmen were Frank Calabrese Sr., Ronnie Jarrett, Butch Petrocelli and Gerald Scarpelli) driving a Ford van drove up alongside them and began firing at the car. Dauber, attempting to avoid the gunfire, crashed the car into an apple tree where, after being set on fire, it was later found by two farmers (the van was later found abandoned only a mile up the road).

The incident was confessed to by Gerald Scarpelli—a longtime associate of The Outfit.

== See also ==
- List of homicides in Illinois § Organized crime
