= Joseph Lombardo =

American mobster (1929–2019)

- Born: Giuseppe Lombardi; January 1, 1929; Chicago, Illinois, U.S.
- Died: October 19, 2019 (aged 90); Fremont County, Colorado, U.S.
- Other names: "Joey the Clown", "Joe Padula", "Lumbo", "Lumpy", "The Brows"
- Occupation: Mobster
- Spouse: Marion Nigro (m. 1951)
- Children: 2
- Allegiance: Chicago Outfit
- Convictions: Bribery (1982); Skimming (1986); Racketeering, extortion, loan sharking, murder (2007)
- Penalty: 15 years' imprisonment (1982); 10 years' imprisonment (1986); Life imprisonment (2009)

Joseph Patrick Lombardo (born Giuseppe Lombardi; January 1, 1929 – October 19, 2019), also known as "Joey the Clown", was an American mobster and a high-ranking member of the Chicago Outfit crime organization. He was the Consigliere of the Outfit.

== Early life ==
Lombardo was born on January 1, 1929, in Chicago, one of 11 children to Italian immigrants from Bari, Mike Lombardi, a butcher, and Carmela Lombardi. Lombardo, a high school dropout, at some point changed the final letter of his last name. He joined the Outfit in the 1950s.

== Early career ==
Lombardo began his Outfit career as a jewel thief and as a juice-loan collector. In 1963, Lombardo was arrested and charged with kidnapping and loan sharking, but was acquitted after a factory worker who had owed $2,000 and who was behind on his payments could not positively identify Lombardo. The acquittal was Lombardo's 11th in 11 arrests. Lombardo, who by the late 1960s was referred to as an "up-and-comer" in the Chicago Outfit along with Angelo J. LaPietra (known as "The Hook"), would take over the Outfit's operations in Las Vegas in 1971.

For a short period Lombardo functioned as an errand boy for the bail bondsman Irwin Weiner. Later Weiner would post bail for Lombardo's underlings.

== Bribery and skimming convictions ==
On December 15, 1982, Lombardo was convicted, along with Teamsters Union President Roy Williams and insurance executive Allen Dorfman, with bribery of Nevada Democratic State Senator Howard Cannon in order to get a trucking deregulation bill blocked. Lombardo was sentenced to 15 years in prison for his role in the bribe conspiracy. In 1986, Lombardo was convicted of skimming over $2 million in proceeds in several Strip casinos (including the Stardust Resort & Casino), and was sentenced to another 10 years in prison. Lombardo was released on November 13, 1992, after serving only 10 years in prison.

Following his release, Lombardo took the unusual step of taking out a small classified ad in the Chicago Tribune that read: "I never took a secret oath, with guns and daggers, pricked my finger, drew blood or burned paper to join a criminal organization. If anyone hears my name used in connection with any criminal activity, please notify the FBI, local police, and my parole officer, Ron Kumke."

== Indictment, fugitive, and Family Secrets trial ==
In 2003, Chicago newspapers began reporting that federal investigators were looking into solving old mob murders. In 2003, the FBI swabbed Lombardo for DNA. Federal authorities also notified Lombardo during the probe that his life might be in danger. On April 25, 2005, Lombardo was indicted along with 13 other defendants as part of the federal government's Operation Family Secrets investigation, which lifted the veil on 18 killings since the 1970s that federal investigators had attributed to the Outfit. Lombardo was indicted for his role in at least one murder, as well as for running a racket based on illegal gambling, loan sharking, and murder. As federal agents rounded up the 14 defendants on April 25, 2005, they realized that Lombardo had disappeared, having become a fugitive after they issued a federal arrest warrant.

While Lombardo's whereabouts were unknown, he wrote letters to his lawyer, Rick Halprin—but directed toward the judge in the trial—in which he claimed to be innocent, requested a $50,000 recognizance bond, offered to take a lie detector test, and asked to be tried separately from the other defendants in the Family Secrets case—all requests that U.S. District Judge James Zagel denied. The first letter from Lombardo surfaced on May 4, 2005, was four pages long and riddled with spelling and grammatical errors. "I am no part of an enterprise or racketering [sic]... Have no part in the poker machines, extorcinate [sic] loans, gambling and what ever else the indictment says," the letter read. "About the 18 murders in the indictment, I want you to know that I was not privy before the murders, during the murders, and after the murders, and to this present writing to you." Lombardo also told Zagel in the letter, "I want you to know that I am not a violent man in any way shape or form. I do not own or have any weapons of any kind. If the F.B.I. should find me I will come peacefully and no resistence [sic] at all." Lombardo also asked Zagel "If you have any ideas or suggestion of what I should do, notify my lawyer he could reach me by the media." In August and September 2005, Lombardo sent more letters to his attorney, indicating that he had been following local news coverage of a state hearing involving allegations that the mayor of Rosemont, Illinois, Donald Stephens, had met with several members of the Chicago Outfit. In response, Halprin quipped of his still-at-large client's newspaper-reading habit: "I doubt that he has a home subscription."

The FBI then offered a $20,000 reward for information leading to Lombardo's capture. On January 13, 2006, after over eight months at large, a bearded, unkempt Lombardo, was captured by FBI agents outside the Elmwood Park, Illinois home of his longtime friend Dominic Calarco. Federal agents had been tipped off to Lombardo's whereabouts after Lombardo had visited dead Outfit mobster Tony Spilotro's dentist brother, Patrick Spilotro, for an abscessed tooth. He was carrying $3,000 at the time of the arrest. At his arraignment, Lombardo pleaded "not guilty". He also revealed that he had atherosclerosis and had not seen a doctor while he was at large because "I was – what do they call it? I was unavailable", prompting laughter in the courtroom.

During the trial, which was prosecuted by Assistant U.S. Attorneys Mitchell Mars, T. Markus Funk, and John Scully, Lombardo took the stand in his own defense, denying any involvement in the September, 1974 murder of Daniel Seifert, claiming to have been at a police station at the time of the slaying, reporting the disappearance of his wallet. Federal prosecutors, however, noted Lombardo's fingerprint on the title application for a car used in the murder of Seifert. In addition, prosecutors pointed out that employees of an electronics store identified Lombardo as the purchaser of a police scanner used in Seifert's murder. Seifert was murdered in Bensenville, Illinois on September 27, 1974, execution style, and federal prosecutors say it was committed in front of Seifert's wife, who was holding her young son in her arms.

== Conviction and sentencing ==
On September 10, 2007, Lombardo was convicted of racketeering, extortion, loan sharking and murder. On September 27, 2007, the same jury found Lombardo guilty of the 1974 Seifert murder.

On February 2, 2009, Zagel sentenced Lombardo, seated in a wheelchair, to life in prison for the convictions. Lombardo had continually professed his innocence, telling the court, "Now I suppose the court is going to send me to a life in prison for something I did not do." He also said he was sorry for the suffering of the Seifert family but added, "I did not kill Danny Seifert." Zagel had told Lombardo, "Mr. Lombardo, you are not like the toxic creature I've seen forming in one of your co-defendants," referring to Frank Calabrese, Sr., whom Zagel had sentenced to life in prison the previous week, but after Lombardo had insisted his innocence, Zagel also said, "The worst things you have done are terrible and I see no regret in you."

== Prison and death ==
In September 2006, while in federal lockup at the Metropolitan Correctional Center in Chicago, Lombardo had a heart attack and was taken to Northwestern Memorial Hospital, where he was diagnosed as having had a minor heart attack; he was put into an operating room where he underwent surgery, to have a stent installed—his fourth stent procedure. It was also reported he suffered from throat cancer and that his gallbladder had been removed.

He served his sentence at the ADX Florence supermax prison, where he died on October 19, 2019, at the age of 90.

== Personal life ==
Lombardo earned the nickname "The Clown" from his joking demeanor and for his various antics, including grinning wide for mug shots and for departing a 1981 court appearance at the federal courts building in Chicago holding a Chicago Sun-Times newspaper in front of his face with a hole cut out so he could see. In 2005, Halprin spoke to the Chicago Tribune about his client's nickname, saying "[T]hat's a name he doesn't relish, and neither do I. The guy I know is not a clown."

Lombardo married Marion Nigro in a Catholic ceremony in 1951. They had two children. Lombardo lived in the same modest condominium building on West Ohio Street, on the Near West Side of Chicago, from the time he was married until he became a fugitive in 2005.

Lombardo and his wife, Marion, reportedly divorced in 1991, but Lombardo continued to reside in the same condominium building, moving after his divorce to a basement unit. In 2006, federal prosecutors alleged that Lombardo's divorce was a sham to hide money. "If you think it's a sham divorce, investigate it", Lombardo's attorney Rick Halprin told reporters on February 9, 2006.

Prosecutors said Marion Lombardo appeared to have sold three parcels in Florida held by the MJJ Trust for more than $4.5 million in 2003. They said there is a May 1992 dissolution of marriage record but that it appears the Lombardos lived together until the latest indictment. They said two warranty deeds recording the sale of the Florida property referred to Marion Lombardo as "a married woman". Lombardo's lawyer had stated that the assets had been placed in an "irrevocable trust" for Lombardo's family.
