= Metropolitan Correctional Center, Chicago =

Federal prison in Illinois, United States

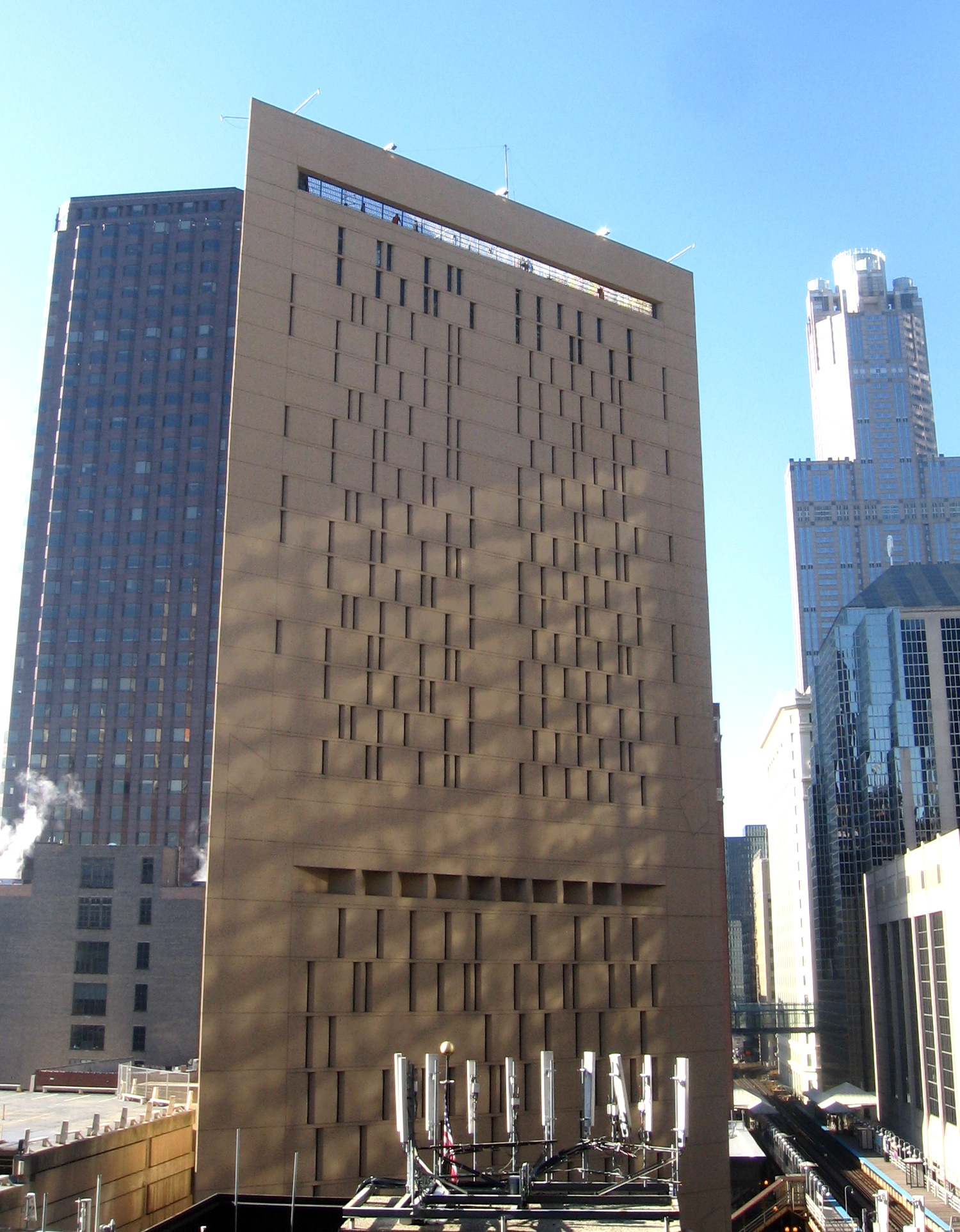
- Interactive map of Metropolitan Correctional Center, Chicago
- Location: Chicago, Illinois; 41°52′36″N 87°37′50″W
- Status: Operational
- Security class: Metropolitan Correctional Center
- Population: 683
- Opened: 1975
- Managed by: Federal Bureau of Prisons

The Metropolitan Correctional Center, Chicago (MCC Chicago) is a United States federal prison in Chicago, Illinois, United States. It holds imprisoned men and women of all security levels before and during court proceedings in the Northern District of Illinois, and for brief sentences. It is operated by the Federal Bureau of Prisons, a division of the United States Department of Justice.

== History and design ==
MCC Chicago was designed by architect Harry Weese. Construction began in 1971 and the facility opened in 1975. The 28-story building has the plan form of a right triangle.

Unlike other federal prison facilities, each cell has a floor-to-ceiling slit window, 7 feet (2.1 m) long by 5 inches (130 mm) wide, narrow enough not to require bars, and beveled out to allow natural light to pass inside. The cells were designed to feel as comfortable as possible, based on sailboat cabins, with built-in hardwood beds and desks. Most of these features have since been removed.

== Prison life ==
An exercise yard is available for inmates on the roof of the building, enclosed by 30-foot (9.1 m) tall concrete walls with fenced openings. A recreation center in the basement holds fitness equipment and board games. The leisure and law libraries are housed on the ninth floor along with classrooms and offices. There is a security housing unit (SHU) for male prisoners, while female prisoners needing to be isolated, as of 2005, have been taken to the Cook County Jail.

As of 2005 women prisoners may visit the exercise room and law library once per week. The prison only allows male inmates, not females, to have prison jobs such as working in the prison kitchen. Piper Kerman, the author of Orange is the New Black, wrote that circa 2005 the institution was not responsive to the demands of the prisoners, who were in "misery", and that the prison guards, who were "often pleasant, if unprofessional", were unable to make meaningful change.

== Notable inmates ==
Inmate Name	Register Number	Photo	Status	Details
Venkatesh Bhogireddy	54602-424		Transferred to FCI Allenwood Low. Serving a 10-year sentence; scheduled for release on January 12, 2029.	Initially arrested for domestic violence and child abuse; later tried and convicted in May 2021 on 5 counts of Conspiracy to Murder for Hire.
R. Kelly	09627-035		Transferred to FCI Butner Medium I. Serving a 31-year sentence; scheduled for release on January 31, 2046.	Initially arrested in Chicago for sex crimes and obstruction of justice; later tried and convicted in September 2021 on nine counts including racketeering, sexual exploitation of a child, kidnapping, bribery, sex trafficking, and a violation of the Mann Act. Kelly was sentenced to 30 years in prison by the United States District Court for the Eastern District of New York. He was later sentenced to 20 years in prison by the United States District Court for the Northern District of Illinois for producing child pornography; 19 of those years will be served concurrently with his New York federal conviction.
James Marcello	99076-012		Transferred to ADX Florence. Serving a life sentence.	"Front Boss" of the Chicago Outfit; convicted of racketeering, conspiracy for participating in 18 murders, and directing criminal activities including extortion, illegal gambling, loan sharking, and bribery.
Larry Hoover	86063-024]		Transferred to ADX Florence. Sentenced to six consecutive life sentences; commuted by President Donald Trump in May 2025. Currently serving a 200-year state prison sentence in Illinois.	Leader of the Gangster Disciples in Chicago; sentenced to life in state prison in 1973 for murder; convicted in 1997 of drug conspiracy, extortion, money laundering, and running a continuing criminal enterprise for leading the gang from state prison.
Ovidio Guzmán López	72884-748		Currently awaiting trial.	Alleged leader of the Sinaloa Cartel. He was captured in Mexico by authorities on January 5, 2023 and was extradited to the United States on September 15, 2023.
Heather Mack	72776-509		Transferred to FCI Hazelton. Serving a 26-year sentence; scheduled for release on March 20, 2044.	Mack, who served 7 years in an Indonesian prison for the murder of her mother Sheila, was arrested upon arrival at O'Hare International Airport after being released and deported from Indonesia. In June 2023, she reached a plea agreement and was convicted on 1 count of conspiring to kill her mother with her then-boyfriend Tommy Schaefer to get access to a $1.5 million trust fund. She was later given a 26-year sentence.
Alfredo Vasquez-Hernandez	45111-424		Transferred to FCI Allenwood Low. Serving a 22-year sentence; scheduled for release on October 5, 2028.	High-ranking members of the Sinaloa Cartel, a multibillion-dollar drug trafficking organization based in Mexico; extradited and indicted in 2012 on charges that they supplied Chicago with 2000 kilograms of cocaine per month, valued at over $1 billion.
Tomas Arevalo-Renteria	42886-424		Sentenced to 19 years. Released on March 18, 2026.	High-ranking members of the Sinaloa Cartel, a multibillion-dollar drug trafficking organization based in Mexico; extradited and indicted in 2012 on charges that they supplied Chicago with 2000 kilograms of cocaine per month, valued at over $1 billion.
Joseph Konopka	20749-424		Served a 20-year sentence; released in 2019.	Pleaded guilty in 2002 to causing blackouts in Wisconsin by damaging power substations and utility facilities, as well as storing potassium cyanide and sodium cyanide in the Chicago subway system; also known as "Dr. Chaos."
Kent Sorenson	15000-030		Served a 15-month sentence; released April 13, 2018.	State senator and political consultant sentenced to 15 months for federal campaign violations in regards to work performed on Ron Paul's presidential campaign.
Nikesh A. Patel	61337-018		Transferred to FCI Cumberland. Serving a 27-year sentence; scheduled for release on October 1, 2061.	Orlando, Florida based businessman who orchestrated the sale of 26 fraudulent loans totaling over $179 million.
George Cottrell	46832-424		Released August 8, 2016	British politician, arrested at O'Hare International Airport by the IRS Criminal Investigation Division in 2016. Federally indicted on 21 counts for conspiracy to commit money laundering, wire fraud, blackmail and extortion.
Piper Kerman	11187-424		Transferred to FCI Danbury. Served a 13-month sentence; released in 2005.	Plead guilty to money laundering and drug trafficking in 1998 before beginning her sentence in 2004. Her memoir, Orange Is the New Black: My Year in a Women's Prison, was adapted into the Netflix series Orange is the New Black.
Ramon Abbas	54313-424		Transferred to FCI Fort Dix. Serving an 11-year sentence; scheduled for release on March 15, 2029.	Instagram influencer known as Hushpuppi. In 2022, he was convicted on one count of conspiracy to engage in money laundering for his role in a multi-million dollar online fraud scheme.
Thomas James Zajac	22313-424		Transferred to FCI Cumberland. Serving consecutive 35- and 20-year sentences.	Convicted in 2010 of using a destructive device and other charges for detonating a homemade pipe bomb at the Salt Lake City Public Library in Utah on September 15, 2006, in retaliation against Salt Lake City police for arresting his son. In 2024, he was convicted for using a pipe-bomb on September 1, 2006 in suburban Hinsdale, Illinois.
Kevin Trudeau	18046-036		Served a 10-year sentence. Released in 2022.	Convicted in 2013 of criminal contempt for violating a 2004 federal court order that prohibited him from making deceptive television infomercials that misrepresented the contents of his weight loss cure book.

== Notable events ==
=== 1985 escapes ===
In 1985, convicted murderers Bernard Welch and Hugh Colomb assembled the materials necessary to break open a window hole and gain egress from the MCC, escaping down a piecework rope to street level. They were eventually recaptured after a months-long nationwide manhunt.

=== 2009 escape plot ===
In October 2009, Matthew Nolan (28750-045), brother of film director Christopher Nolan, assembled bedsheets and other materials for a foiled window escape plan that was later called "impossible" by the judge who sentenced Nolan to 14 months for the attempt. Nolan was being held at the MCC awaiting extradition to Costa Rica on a passport charge (his charges having been reduced from earlier capital offenses) at the time of the foiled plot.

=== Vicente Zambada-Niebla lawsuit ===
In February 2010, Sinaloa Cartel leader Vicente Zambada-Niebla was apprehended by Mexican police and extradited to Chicago to face trial. Considered a high security risk, he was placed in segregation (commonly known as "solitary confinement"). Based on intelligence that allies of Zambada-Niebla were planning a helicopter escape, Zambada-Niebla was not allowed access to the rooftop exercise yard. Bureau of Prisons officials cited the fact that the Sinaloa Cartel has unlimited resources and has succeeded in both escapes and assassinations in the past. Zambada-Niebla sued the Bureau of Prisons in 2011 claiming that his being denied exercise constituted cruel and unusual punishment. In September 2011, US District Judge Ruben Castillo ruled that since Zambada-Niebla had not been convicted, placing him in segregation was unwarranted. In order to comply with the ruling and alleviate security concerns, the Bureau of Prisons transferred Zambada-Niebla to the Federal Correctional Institution, Milan, a medium-security facility in Michigan which has a ground-level exercise area.

=== 2012 escape ===
In the early morning hours of December 18, 2012, two convicted bank robbers, Kenneth Conley (28560-298) and Joseph "Jose" Banks (22652-424), escaped the secure facility. Conley and Banks were being housed in the MCC while awaiting sentencing on their bank robbery convictions, crimes which were unrelated beyond the pair being cellmates at the MCC. The escape by Banks and Conley was the first from any secure federal correctional facility since April 2006, when convicted murderer Richard Lee McNair escaped from the U.S. Penitentiary, Pollock, Louisiana. The pair ostensibly fashioned a rope from bedsheets or fabric scraps, and exited their 17th-floor cell through a hole created at the bottom of a narrow window slot, rappelling down the side of the MCC to the street below.

Their escape and the gaping hole in the prison wall apparently went unnoticed during routine overnight bed checks, and was only discovered when arriving jail workers spotted the rope dangling down the side of the MCC at about 7:00 am. The inmates had obtained and concealed large numbers of bedsheets, fake iron window bars used to mimic the real bars they removed and hid, passable street clothing, and bulky materials used to fool guards into believing they were asleep in bed. It is unclear what tools were used to create the hole in the wall necessary for the escape, and if these had been hidden in the cell for an extended period of time.

Conley and Banks were subsequently recorded on a nearby video security system as they entered a cab at the corner of Congress Parkway and Michigan Avenue at about 2:40 am. In the video, they were wearing some form of light-colored plain clothes, and not their bright-orange, prison-issue jumpsuits. The identity of the cab driver and cab company, as well as how the convicts paid the cab fare, remained unclear.

On December 20, 2012, Banks was recaptured by FBI agents and the Chicago police in the 2300 block of North Bosworth Avenue. On January 3, 2013, Conley was apprehended in Palos Hills, Illinois. Conley and Banks are currently incarcerated at Florence ADX, the supermax facility in Colorado which holds the most dangerous inmates in the federal system, as well as inmates who constitute a high escape risk. Their release dates are in 2032 and 2040. Banks filed a $10 million lawsuit in 2014 for negligence for allowing him to escape. The lawsuit was dismissed by the 7th Circuit Court of Appeals.

== See also ==
- List of U.S. federal prisons
- Federal Bureau of Prisons
- Incarceration in the United States
