= James Zagel =

American judge (1941–2023)

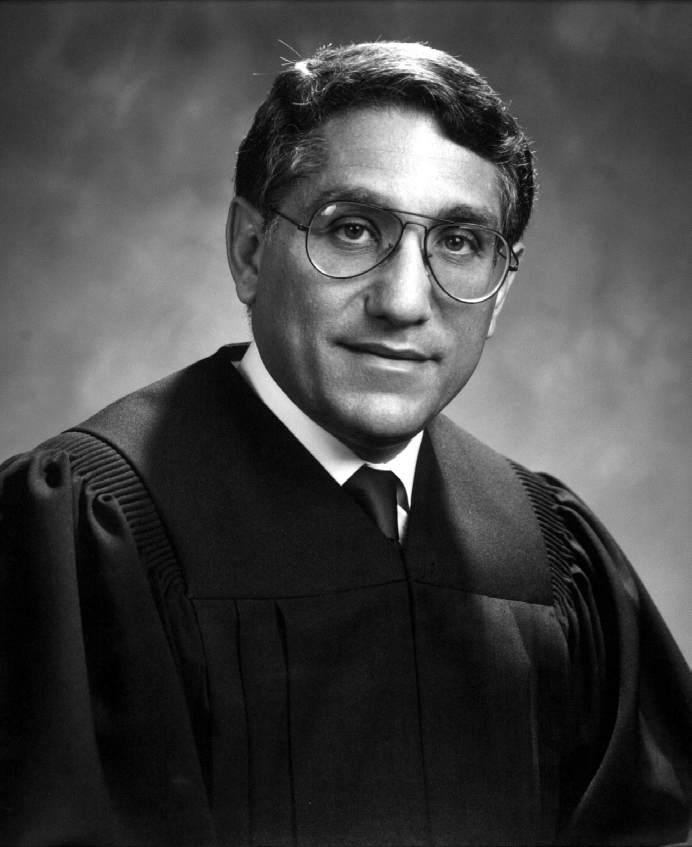

Senior Judge of the United States District Court for the Northern District of Illinois
- In office October 21, 2016 – July 15, 2023

Judge of the United States District Court for the Northern District of Illinois
- In office April 22, 1987 – October 21, 2016
- Appointed by: Ronald Reagan
- Preceded by: Frank James McGarr
- Succeeded by: Steven C. Seeger

Judge of the United States Foreign Intelligence Surveillance Court
- In office May 18, 2008 – May 18, 2015
- Appointed by: John Roberts
- Preceded by: James Robertson
- Succeeded by: Thomas B. Russell

Personal details
- Born: James Block Zagel; March 4, 1941 Chicago, Illinois, U.S.
- Died: July 15, 2023 (aged 82) Chicago, Illinois, U.S.
- Spouses: Pam Zekman (div. 1975); Margaret Maxwell (m. 1979)
- Education: University of Chicago (BA, MA); Harvard University (JD)

James Block Zagel (March 4, 1941 – July 15, 2023) was an American judge and attorney. After a stint as a prosecutor, he became a United States district judge of the United States District Court for the Northern District of Illinois in 1987, assuming senior status in 2016. He presided over numerous high-profile trials, including those of several members of the Chicago Outfit and the corruption trial of former Governor of Illinois Rod Blagojevich. Zagel also sat on the United States Foreign Intelligence Surveillance Court from 2008 to 2015.

== Early life and education ==
Zagel was born to Jewish parents in Chicago on March 4, 1941. He was the son of Samuel S. Zagel, a native of Kłodawa, Poland, who had immigrated to Chicago in 1915, and Ethel Samuels Zagel. Zagel earned a Bachelor of Arts degree from the University of Chicago in 1962 and a Master of Arts degree from the University of Chicago in the same year. He then earned a Juris Doctor from Harvard Law School in 1965.

== Professional career ==
Zagel began his career as an assistant state's attorney in Cook County, Illinois, from 1965 until 1969, where he helped compile the case against mass murderer Richard Speck. He then served as an assistant attorney general for the State of Illinois from 1969 until 1977. Concurrent to the job as assistant attorney general, Zagel ran the Criminal Justice Division in the attorney general's office from 1970 until 1977, and he also served as the chief prosecuting attorney for the Illinois Judicial Inquiry Board from 1973 until 1975. In 1977, Zagel became executive director of the Illinois Law Enforcement Commission, a post he held until 1979. From 1979 until 1980, Zagel was the director of the Illinois Department of Revenue. From 1980 until joining the federal bench in 1987, Zagel was the director of the Illinois State Police.

== Federal judicial service ==
Zagel was a finalist for a federal judgeship in 1985, but was not chosen. On February 2, 1987, President Reagan nominated Zagel to be a judge on the United States District Court for the Northern District of Illinois. The United States Senate confirmed Zagel on April 21, 1987, and he received his commission on April 22, 1987. He took senior status on October 21, 2016. From 2008 to 2015, Zagel served a seven-year term on the FISA Court.

=== Trial history ===
Zagel presided over many notable and high-profile trials, including the Jesse Webster case and the "Family Secrets" trial that ended in 2007, where he convicted numerous mobsters, such as Joseph Lombardo and Frank Calabrese Sr. In April 2009, it was announced that Zagel would preside over the federal corruption trial of former Illinois Governor Rod Blagojevich and his brother, Robert Blagojevich. The judge refused to let Blagojevich go to Costa Rica to participate in the show, I'm A Celebrity, Get Me Out Of Here, saying Blagojevich needed to prepare a good defense for his upcoming trial and focus on the reality of the current situation. The former governor's wife Patti Blagojevich went instead. In August 2010, jury deliberations began in the Blagojevich trial. Rod Blagojevich was convicted on one charge, of lying to the Federal Bureau of Investigation, with a hung jury on 22 other charges. He was retried in June 2011, with Zagel presiding, and the jury returned a guilty verdict on 17 of the remaining counts, including those pertaining to the Obama Senate seat. On December 7, 2011, Zagel sentenced Rod Blagojevich to 14 years in federal prison, though the sentence was commuted by President Donald Trump in 2020.

== Other interests ==
Zagel was described as a "Renaissance man" with a wide variety of interests outside of the courtroom; fellow judge Manish S. Shah told The New York Times that Zagel "could quote Ludwig Wittgenstein and Groucho Marx with an easy charm". He acted in two films, playing a Chicago judge in the 1989 film Music Box, and a physician whose parent is murdered in the 1991 film Homicide. He was credited under the name of J. S. Block. In 2002, he published a novel titled Money to Burn, a fictional thriller about a plot to rob the Federal Reserve Bank.

== Personal life and death ==
Zagel and his first wife, Chicago Tribune investigative reporter Pam Zekman, divorced in 1975. He then was married to lawyer Margaret Maxwell Zagel from around 1979 until his death.

Zagel died from heart failure at his home in Chicago on July 15, 2023, at the age of 82.

== Sources ==
Legal offices
| Preceded by Frank James McGarr | Judge of the United States District Court for the Northern District of Illinois; 1987–2016 | Succeeded by Steven C. Seeger |
| Preceded by James Robertson | Judge of the United States Foreign Intelligence Surveillance Court; 2008–2015 | Succeeded by Thomas B. Russell |
