= Angelo LaPietra =

American gangster

- LaPietra's December 10, 1992 mugshot
- Born: Angelo J. LaPietra; October 30, 1920; Cicero, Illinois, U.S.
- Died: March 28, 1999 (aged 78); Hillside, Illinois, U.S.
- Other names: "The Bull"; "The Hook"
- Occupation: Mobster
- Allegiance: Chicago Outfit

Angelo J. LaPietra (October 30, 1920– March 28, 1999) was an American mobster and caporegime in the Chicago Outfit, involved in extensive loansharking operations in the Chicago's First Ward during the 1970s and 1980s.

== Criminal career ==
LaPietra was born in Cicero, Illinois to first-generation immigrants from Naples, Italy, He had an extensive criminal record dating back to 1938 that included murder, kidnapping and narcotics. LaPietra became an enforcer for the Chicago Outfit, and was involved in burglary and car theft operations.

After being promoted to caporegime in 1977, LaPietra built a large, fortress-like home in the Bridgeport neighborhood of Chicago, close to Comiskey Park. As capo of the Outfit's 26th Street/Chinatown crew, LaPietra controlled gambling, loansharking and auto theft rackets on Chicago's South Side. He rose to become a senior figure in the Chicago Mafia and a close associate of Outfit front boss Joseph "Joey Doves" Aiuppa.

In 1982, LaPietra was one of nine men acquitted as members of a major burglary ring.

=== Guilty plea and imprisonment ===
As the result of a five-year federal investigation into organized crime following the murder of a small-time Kansas City mobster, LaPietra was indicted along with Aiuppa, Jackie "the Lackey" Cerone, and fifteen other mobsters from five cities.

LaPietra was later accused by a Kansas City grand jury with skimming an estimated $2 million from syndicate-controlled Las Vegas casinos. Federal authorities further charged that, by using money from the Teamsters Union Central States Pension Fund, the mobsters were able to consolidate their control over some Las Vegas casinos during the 1950s and 1960s. Federal agents had also recorded at least 12,000 hours of phone conversations through wire taps from organized crime figures in Kansas City, Milwaukee, Chicago and Las Vegas, over a period of four years.

In July 1984, LaPietra's attorney Louis Carbonara requested to federally appointed Judge Joseph A. Stephens, Jr. to have the tapes be transcribed and made available for the defendants. However, due to opposition from Chief David B.B. Helfrey, the U.S. Department of Justice's Organized Crime Strike Force in Kansas City, Missouri refused to transcribe the tapes claiming the difficulties regarding the numerous jurisdictions involved in wiretapping. This issue, among other factors, caused a series of continuances and delays as the case continued for two years, and by September 1985, was called by law enforcement officials as one of the longest in 20 years of prosecution into organized crime. While in prison in Connecticut (1988), he was disciplined and moved to a more secure prison in Virginia. His soldiers "Shorty" and brother Jimmy were caught smuggling in his favorite Italian food from Chicago.

On January 21, 1986, Aiuppa, Cerone and LaPietra pleaded guilty to conspiring to conceal ownership in a syndicate-controlled Las Vegas casino. LaPietra was sentenced to 16 years imprisonment and fined $143,409 (Aiuppa and Cerone were sentenced to 28½ years imprisonment and fined $43,000 and $430,324 respectively). LaPietra was released from prison in 1997.

In October 1996, the 25th Ward Alderman Danny Solis (appointed by Mayor Richard M. Daley) presented LaPietra a plaque and award for his leadership and commitment to the community. It recognized him and the Italian Club as "decision makers".

=== Release from prison ===
After his release from prison, LaPietra was a founder and chairman of the board of the Old Neighborhood Italian-American Club.

== Death ==
LaPietra died of natural causes on March 28, 1999, aged 78. He is buried along with many other mobsters at Queen of Heaven Cemetery in Hillside, a Western Suburb of Chicago.

== Nickname ==
It is often repeated that he earned his nickname "The Hook" due to the way he murdered his victims—those that did not, or could not pay up. It was said that he would take his victim—bound and gagged—and hang him on a meat hook (piercing the victim's rib cage with the meat hook) and then torture him to death with a blow-torch. The real basis for his nickname was because it was said that once you took a juice loan from him, he would have his "hooks" in you, and he would use the juice on those loans to get you on the "hook" for more loans, or property or businesses as collateral to make good.

== Sources ==
- Devito, Carlo. The Encyclopedia of International Organized Crime. New York: Facts On File Inc., 2005. ISBN 0-8160-4848-7
