= Stiehl =

Stiehl is a surname. Notable people with the surname include:

- Celeste M. Stiehl (1925–2026), American politician
- Jessica Stiehl, character in the television series Verbotene Liebe
- William Donald Stiehl (1925–2016), American judge
