= Judge McGlynn =

Judge McGlynn may refer to:

- Joseph Leo McGlynn Jr. (1925–1999), judge of the United States District Court for the Eastern District of Pennsylvania
- Stephen P. McGlynn (born 1962), judge of the United States District Court for the Southern District of Illinois
