= G. Patrick Murphy =

American judge

Chief Judge of the United States District Court for the Southern District of Illinois
- In office 2000–2007
- Preceded by: John Phil Gilbert
- Succeeded by: David R. Herndon

Judge of the United States District Court for the Southern District of Illinois
- In office April 3, 1998 – December 1, 2013
- Appointed by: Bill Clinton
- Preceded by: William D. Stiehl
- Succeeded by: Nancy J. Rosenstengel

Personal details
- Born: December 1, 1948 (age 77) Carbondale, Illinois, U.S.
- Education: Southern Illinois University (B.S.); Southern Illinois University School of Law (J.D.)

George Patrick Murphy (born December 1, 1948) is a former United States district judge of the United States District Court for the Southern District of Illinois.

== Education and career ==
Born in Carbondale, Illinois, Murphy was in the United States Marine Corps during the Vietnam War, from 1966 to 1969, and then received a Bachelor of Science degree from Southern Illinois University in 1974 and a Juris Doctor from Southern Illinois University School of Law in 1978. He was in private practice in Marion, Illinois from 1978 to 1998, and is doing so again after his tenure as a federal judge ended.

== Federal judicial service ==
On July 31, 1997, Murphy was nominated by President Bill Clinton to a seat on the United States District Court for the Southern District of Illinois vacated by William D. Stiehl. Murphy was confirmed by the United States Senate on April 2, 1998, and received his commission on April 3, 1998. He served as chief judge from 2000 to 2007. He retired on December 1, 2013.

== Sources ==
Legal offices
Preceded by William D. Stiehl	Judge of the United States District Court for the Southern District of Illinois; 1998–2013	Succeeded by Nancy J. Rosenstengel
Preceded by John Phil Gilbert	Chief Judge of the United States District Court for the Southern District of Illinois; 2000–2007	Succeeded by David R. Herndon
