= Andrew J. Kuykendall =

American politician and lawyer (1815–1891)

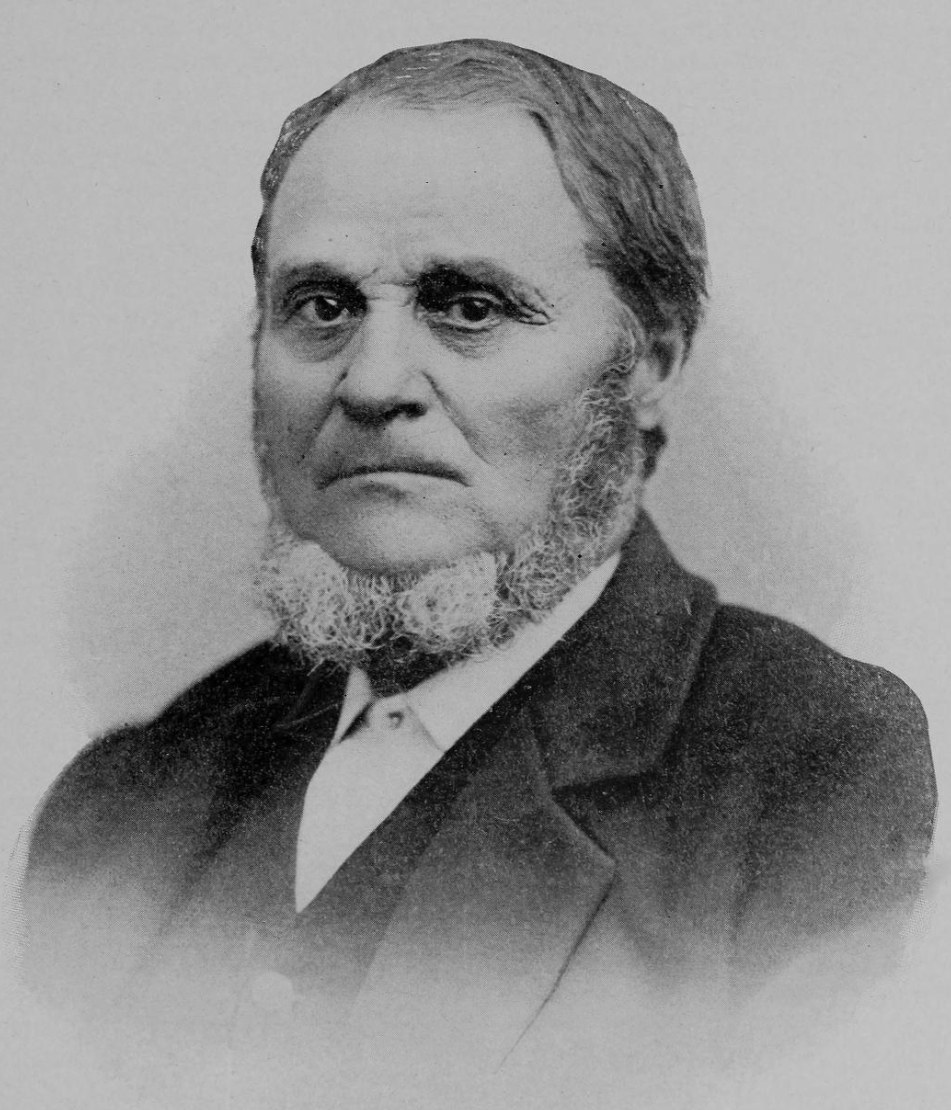

Member of the U.S. House of Representatives from Illinois's 13th district
- In office March 4, 1865 – March 3, 1867
- Preceded by: William J. Allen
- Succeeded by: Green Berry Raum

Member of the Illinois Senate
- In office 1878-1882

Member of the Illinois House of Representatives
- In office 1842-1862

Personal details
- Born: March 3, 1815 Gallatin County, Illinois, US
- Died: May 11, 1891 (aged 76) Vienna, Illinois, US
- Party: Republican
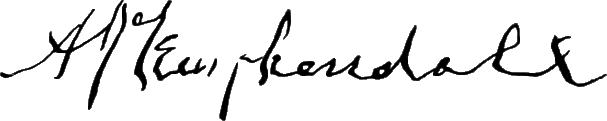
- Signature

Andrew Jackson Kuykendall (March 3, 1815 – May 11, 1891) was a U.S. representative from Illinois.

== Biography ==
Born in Gallatin County, Illinois, Kuykendall completed preparatory studies and later studied law. He was admitted to the bar in 1840 and commenced practice in Vienna, Illinois. He served as a member of the Illinois House of Representatives from 1842 to 1862.

During the Civil War, Kuykendall served one year in the Union Army as the major of the 31st Illinois Infantry.

Kuykendall was elected as a Republican to the Thirty-ninth Congress (March 4, 1865 – March 3, 1867). He resumed the practice of law in Vienna, Illinois. He later served as the county and probate judge of Johnson County, Illinois from 1873 to 1881. He served as member of the Illinois State Senate from 1878 to 1882. He retired from public life and engaged in agricultural pursuits.

A. J. Kuykendall died in Vienna, Illinois, May 11, 1891, and was interred in the Fraternal Cemetery.

U.S. House of Representatives
Preceded by William J. Allen	Member of the U.S. House of Representatives from Illinois's 13th congressional district March 4, 1865 – March 3, 1867	Succeeded by Green B. Raum
