= David R. Herndon =

American judge

Chief Judge of the United States District Court for the Southern District of Illinois
- In office 2007–2014
- Preceded by: G. Patrick Murphy
- Succeeded by: Michael Joseph Reagan

Judge of the United States District Court for the Southern District of Illinois
- In office October 22, 1998 – January 7, 2019
- Appointed by: Bill Clinton
- Preceded by: William L. Beatty
- Succeeded by: David W. Dugan

Personal details
- Born: August 23, 1953 (age 72) Sedalia, Missouri, U.S.
- Education: Southern Illinois University Edwardsville (BA); Southern Illinois University School of Law (JD)

David Richard Herndon (born August 23, 1953) is a former United States district judge of the United States District Court for the Southern District of Illinois.

== Education and career ==
Born in Sedalia, Missouri, Herndon received a Bachelor of Arts degree from Southern Illinois University Edwardsville in 1974 and a Juris Doctor from Southern Illinois University School of Law in 1977. He was in private practice from 1977 to 1991, and was an Associate Judge of the Third Judicial Circuit Court of the State of Illinois from 1991 to 1998.

== Federal judicial service ==
On April 23, 1998, Herndon was nominated by President Bill Clinton to a seat on the United States District Court for the Southern District of Illinois vacated by Judge William L. Beatty. Herndon was confirmed by the United States Senate on October 21, 1998, and received his commission on October 22, 1998. He served as Chief Judge of the district from 2007 to 2014. He announced his retirement from service, effective January 7, 2019. He retired from active service on January 7, 2019.

== Sources ==
Legal offices
| Preceded by William L. Beatty | Judge of the United States District Court for the Southern District of Illinois; 1998–2019 | Succeeded by David W. Dugan |
| Preceded by G. Patrick Murphy | Chief Judge of the United States District Court for the Southern District of Illinois; 2007–2014 | Succeeded by Michael Joseph Reagan |
