= Paul E. Riley =

American judge (1942–2011)

Judge of the United States District Court for the Southern District of Illinois
- In office October 7, 1994 – October 11, 2001
- Appointed by: Bill Clinton
- Preceded by: Seat established by 104 Stat. 5089
- Succeeded by: Seat abolished

Personal details
- Born: April 24, 1942 Alton, Illinois, U.S.
- Died: October 11, 2001 (aged 59) Edwardsville, Illinois, U.S.
- Education: Saint Louis University (B.S.); Saint Louis University School of Law (J.D.)

Paul Eugene Riley (April 24, 1942 – October 11, 2001) was a United States district judge of the United States District Court for the Southern District of Illinois.

== Education and career ==
Born in Alton, Illinois, Riley received a Bachelor of Science degree from Saint Louis University in 1964 and a Juris Doctor from Saint Louis University School of Law in 1967. He was a Hearing examiner for the Illinois Commerce Commission from 1968 to 1969, and was thereafter in private practice in Edwardsville, Illinois from 1969 to 1985, also serving as an assistant public defender for Madison County, Illinois from 1971 to 1982. He was an associate circuit judge for the Third Circuit Court of Illinois from 1985 to 1986, and a circuit judge for that court from 1986 to 1994, including service as chief circuit judge in 1991.

== Federal judicial service ==
On August 16, 1994, Riley was nominated by President Bill Clinton to a new seat on the United States District Court for the Southern District of Illinois, created by 104 Stat. 5089. He was confirmed by the United States Senate on October 6, 1994, and received his commission on October 7, 1994. On December 10, 1999, President Clinton certified Riley involuntarily as disabled pursuant to the act of September 2, 1957, 71 Stat. 586, which authorized the President to appoint an additional judge for the court and provided that no successor to the judge certified as disabled be appointed. Michael Joseph Reagan was appointed to the additional judgeship. Riley served in that capacity until his death, in Edwardsville.

== Sources ==
Legal offices
Preceded by Seat established by 104 Stat. 5089	Judge of the United States District Court for the Southern District of Illinois; 1994–2001	Succeeded by Seat abolished
