= Gino Betts =

American attorney and public servant

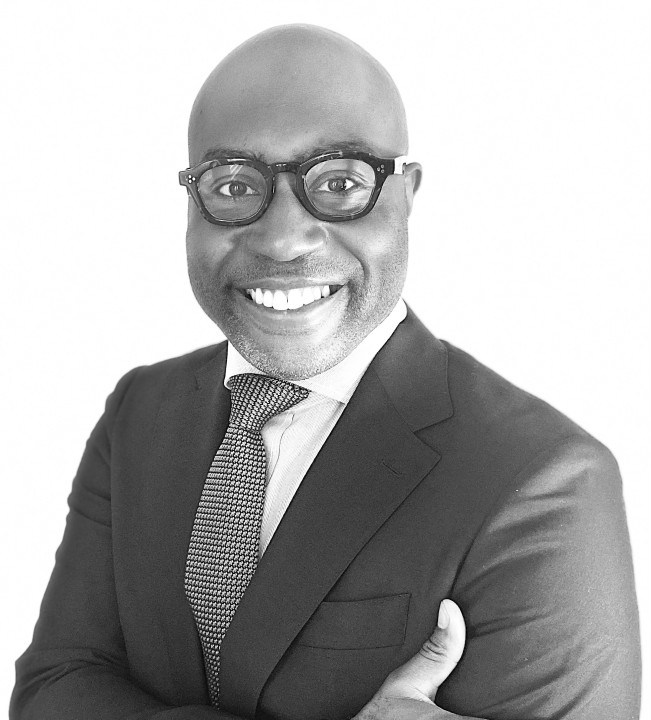
- Education: Northern Illinois University, Southern Illinois University School of Law, Whitney M. Young Magnet High School
- Occupations: Attorney and Organizational Oversight Leader

Gino Betts is an American attorney and public servant known for his work in government oversight, policy reform, and workplace investigations. He has held leadership roles in government agencies, including serving as the director of the Seattle Office of Police Accountability, where he specialized in misconduct investigations, policy reform, and employee relations. Throughout his career, Betts has held various legal, civic and academic positions focused on legal accountability, compliance and community engagement.

== Education ==
Betts earned a Bachelor of Arts in Communications with a minor in English from Northern Illinois University in 2006. He received his Juris Doctor from Southern Illinois University School of Law in 2009. During law school, he studied Comparative Constitutional Law in Cape Town, South Africa, through Howard University School of Law.

== Career ==
Betts began his legal career in 2009 as an Assistant State’s Attorney in Cook County, Illinois, where he prosecuted felony cases and led the Southside Community Justice Center, working with community leaders and law enforcement to address local concerns. From 2017 to 2019, he served as an attorney at the Civilian Office of Police Accountability in Chicago, focusing on high-profile and complex misconduct cases.

In 2022, Betts was appointed Director of the Seattle Office of Police Accountability (OPA) by Mayor Bruce Harrell and unanimously confirmed by City Council. During his tenure, the OPA received Seattle's first Achievement in Oversight award from the National Association for Civilian Oversight of Law Enforcement (NACOLE) for advancing police accountability standards. His tenure drew both praise for advancing the agency and disagreement with law enforcement leadership over operational decision-making.

Betts resigned following allegations of unnecessarily delaying credible complaints made against then Chief Adrian Diaz. He also faced numerous complaints of workplace misconduct from at least seven OPA employees. It was reported that, "the majority of OPA staff have lost confidence in Betts." Shortly after Betts' resignation it was discovered that he failed to review, "a significant number of bias-review documents", a process for complaints of biased policing raised by the community to be reviewed by OPA. On February 10th, 2026, the Seattle Office of the Inspector General announced that, "362 Bias Reviews were sent to [Betts] between August 1, 2022 and November 30, 2024. During this period, [Betts] did not review any Bias Reviews."

Betts has also served as an adjunct professor at DePaul University School of Law and the University of Illinois at Chicago School of Law, teaching legal research, writing, and trial advocacy.

Betts has several professional affiliations, including serving on the boards of the Black Male Lawyers Association, Bobby E. Wright Behavioral Health Center, Hyde Park-Kenwood Community Conference, and as Associate Board President of the Just the Beginning Foundation.

== Awards and honors ==
- Cook County State’s Attorney’s Office Recognition (2013)
- Cook County State’s Attorney’s Office Recognition (2014)
- Earned Seattle’s first Achievement in Oversight Award, National Association for Civilian Oversight of Law Enforcement (2024)
