= Southern Illinois University School of Law =

Public law school in Carbondale, Illinois, US

Coordinates: 37°42′49.2″N 89°13′48.6″W

Southern Illinois University Simmons Law School
- Established: 1972
- School type: Public
- Dean: Hannah Brenner Johnson
- Location: Carbondale, Illinois, USA
- Enrollment: 237 (2020)
- Faculty: 30 (full time)
- USNWR ranking: 175–195 (bottom 25%) (2025)
- Bar pass rate: 79.49% (2024)
- Website: law.siu.edu

Southern Illinois University Simmons Law School (SIU Law) is one of four public law schools in the U.S. state of Illinois. Located in Carbondale, Illinois, it is the only law school in the southern region of Illinois.

== History ==
The Southern Illinois University Simmons School of Law's history began in 1972, when it was established by the Illinois state legislature. Its first class entered in August 1973. The school is housed in the Lesar Law Building, named for its first dean Hiram H. Lesar. The School of Law offers the Juris Doctor degree through a full-time program.

On February 5, 2024, SIU announced the School of Law had received a $10 million gift from John and Jayne Simmons, and would be renamed Simmons Law School, pending Board of Trustees approval.

== Programs ==
The School of Law offers specializations in Business and Transactional Law, Health Law, Intellectual Property, International and Comparative Law, Litigation and Dispute Resolution, and Public Interest Law.

In addition, joint degree programs include: J.D./Doctor of Medicine, J.D./Doctor of Political Science, J.D./Master of Accountancy, J.D./Master of Business Administration, J.D./Master of Science in education, J.D./Master of Electrical and Computer Engineering, J.D./Master of Public Administration, and J.D./Master of Social Work.

== Employment ==
According to SIU Law's official 2020 ABA-required disclosures, 59.40% of the Class of 2020 obtained employment as of March 15, 2020.

== Costs ==
The tuition at SIU Law for the 2020–21 academic year (15 hours each semester) is $21,870 for Illinois residents and out-of-state students (with a tuition offset covering the difference between in-state and out-of-state tuition rates).

SIU Law was ranked 21 out of 193 law schools for average debt incurred at graduation by US News in their 2022 Best Law Schools rankings.

== Student organizations ==
The School of Law offers its students the opportunity to join over 20 student organizations including:

- American Constitution Society
- Black Law Student Association
- Cultural Heritage Law Society
- Federalist Society
- 4th Amendment Association
- Hispanic Latinx Law Student Assoc.
- Intellectual Property Society
- International/Immigration Law Society
- Law Democrats
- Law & Medicine Society
- Law Students for Reproductive Justice
- Military Law
- SIU Law Social Justice Initiative (NLG)
- OUTlaw
- Parents Attending Law School
- Phi Alpha Delta
- Phi Delta Phi
- Second Amendment Association
- Sports Lawyers Association
- Student Animal Legal Defense
- SBA
- Women's Law Forum

== Journal ==
=== Southern Illinois University Law Journal ===
The Southern Illinois University Law Journal is a student-edited journal that publishes articles designed to assist the legal community and to stimulate critical discussion of current legal, policy, and social issues. The Journal publishes three issues per year.

== Clinics and Externships ==
=== Civil Practice/Elderly Clinic ===
The Civil Practice/Elderly Clinic provides a full range of civil legal services to those 60 and over in 13 counties in southern Illinois. These services include the drafting of simple wills and powers of attorney, assistance with securing public benefits and entitlements including Social Security, Medicare, Medicaid and Veteran's benefits. In addition, the clinic handles family law (divorce, etc.) matters, consumer problems, and public utilities problems.

=== Domestic Violence Clinic ===
The Domestic Violence Clinic provided legal representation to victims of domestic violence in Jackson, Williamson and Union counties. In an average order of protection case, students interviewed the client, prepared the client for a hearing, appeared before the court in a contested or uncontested hearing, prepared an order for the court, and followed through with the necessary steps to make the order enforceable. The Domestic Violence Clinic has since been discontinued and is no longer accepting clients or providing legal representation. At this time, no determination has been announced regarding the potential reinstatement of the Clinic or the resumption of its services.

=== Juvenile Justice Clinic ===
Students enrolled in the Juvenile Justice Clinic work with an experienced clinic attorney and perform legal services and duties to minors for whom the clinic attorney has been appointed guardian ad litem.

=== Veterans' Legal Assistance Program ===
The Veterans' Legal Assistance Program provides free legal assistance to veterans in southern Illinois who cannot afford or do not have access to legal representation in the appeals of claims for compensation for service-connected disabilities, pension benefits, survivor benefits, and education benefits.

=== Judicial Externship ===
The Judicial Externship offers an opportunity for law students to learn about the legal system by working for a sitting judge.

=== Public Interest Externship ===
The Public Interest Externship offers hands-on experience working in a publicly funded law office providing public-service legal assistance. Placements include state's attorney offices, public defender offices, legal service offices, and non-profit organizations and governmental agencies.

== Alumni ==
Since the first class graduated in 1976, the number of SIU School of Law graduates has grown to more than 4,573. Alumni practice law in 47 of the 50 states and internationally in more than 12 countries, with more than 144 hold or have held federal and state judgeships.

- William Enyart, U.S. Representative, IL-12 (2013–2015)
- Kim Foxx, State's Attorney, Cook County, Illinois
- Matthew F. Hale, convicted white supremacist.
- Ryan Hatfield, Indiana State Senator (D-77th district)
- David R. Herndon, District Judge, United States District Court for the Southern District of Illinois
- Sue E. Myerscough, District Judge, United States District Court for the Central District of Illinois
- Nancy J. Rosenstengel, District Judge, United States District Court for the Southern District of Illinois
- Paul Schimpf, Illinois State Senator (R-58th district)
- Lena Taylor, Wisconsin State Senator (D-4th district)
- Jil Tracy, Illinois State Senator (R-47th district)
- Whitney Westerfield, Kentucky State Senator (R-3rd district)
- Gino Betts Jr., American attorney and former director of the Seattle Office of Police Accountability.
