= Samuel H. Treat =

American lawyer and judge (1811–1887)

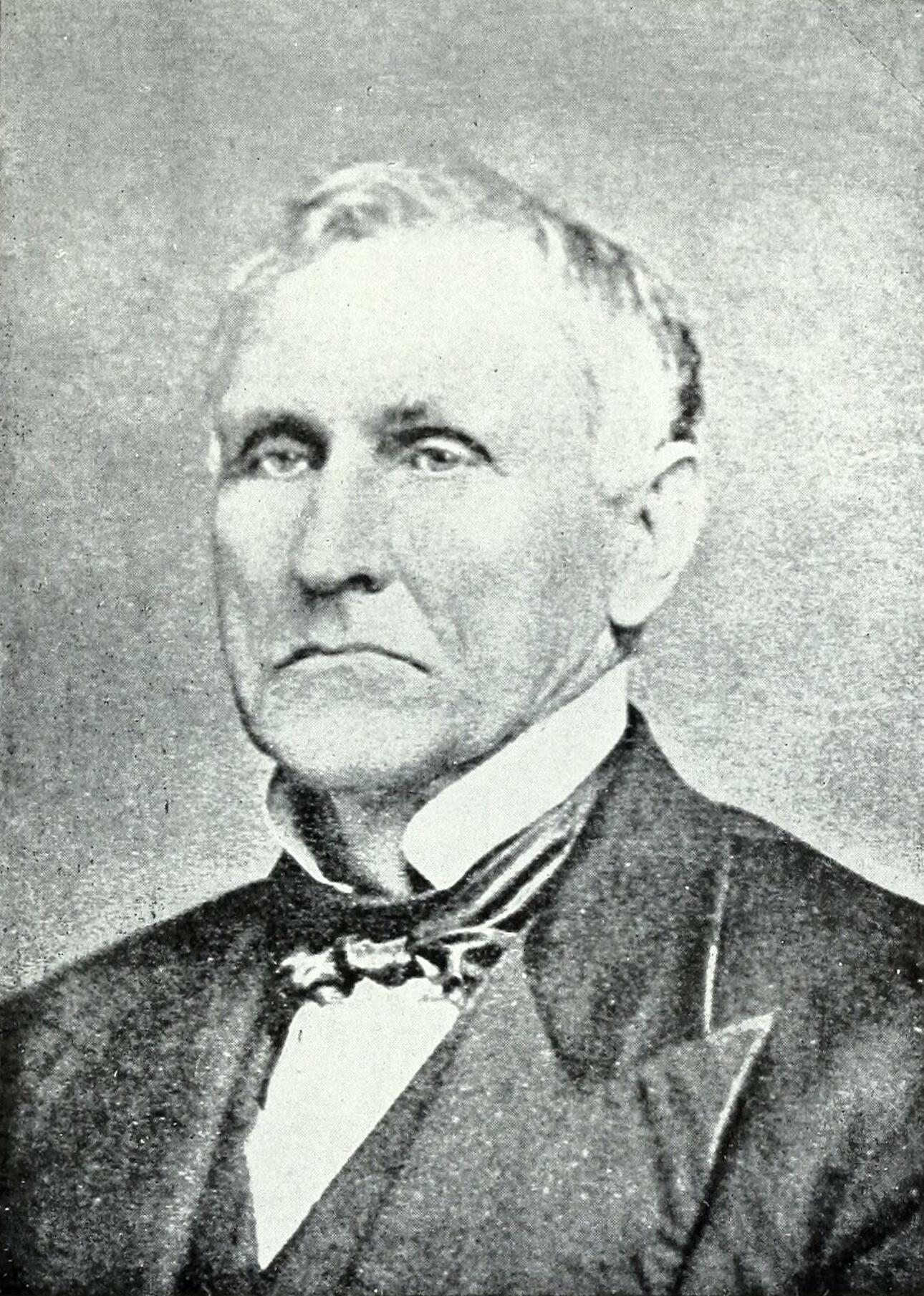

Judge of the United States District Court for the Southern District of Illinois
- In office March 3, 1855 – March 27, 1887
- Appointed by: Franklin Pierce
- Preceded by: Seat established by 10 Stat. 606
- Succeeded by: William J. Allen

Personal details
- Born: Samuel Hubbel Treat Jr. June 21, 1811 Plainfield, New York
- Died: March 27, 1887 (aged 75) Springfield, Illinois
- Education: read law

Samuel Hubbel Treat Jr. (June 21, 1811 – March 27, 1887) was an American lawyer and jurist who served as a justice of the Illinois Supreme Court and a United States district judge of the United States District Court for the Southern District of Illinois.

== Education and career ==
Born in Plainfield, New York, Treat read law to enter the bar in 1834. He was in private practice in Springfield, Illinois, from 1834 to 1839. He was a Judge of the Circuit Court of Illinois from 1839 to 1841, becoming a justice of the Illinois Supreme Court in 1841. He served on that court until 1855, serving as chief justice from 1848.

== Federal judicial service ==
On March 3, 1855, Treat was nominated by President Franklin Pierce to a new seat on the United States District Court for the Southern District of Illinois created by 10 Stat. 606. Treat was confirmed by the United States Senate on March 3, 1855, and received his commission the same day.

=== Court appearances by Abraham Lincoln ===
Abraham Lincoln often appeared in court before Judge Treat. The Illinois State Bar Association estimates that "Between 1839 and 1855, Judge Treat heard Lincoln argue 870 circuit court cases and about 162 Supreme Court matters. As a federal judge, he heard at least 136 more of Lincoln's cases."

== Death ==
He served until his death on March 27, 1887, in Springfield.

== See also ==
- List of United States federal judges by longevity of service

== Sources ==
Legal offices
Preceded by Seat established by 10 Stat. 606	Judge of the United States District Court for the Southern District of Illinois; 1855–1887	Succeeded by William J. Allen
