= David W. Dugan =

American judge (born 1960)

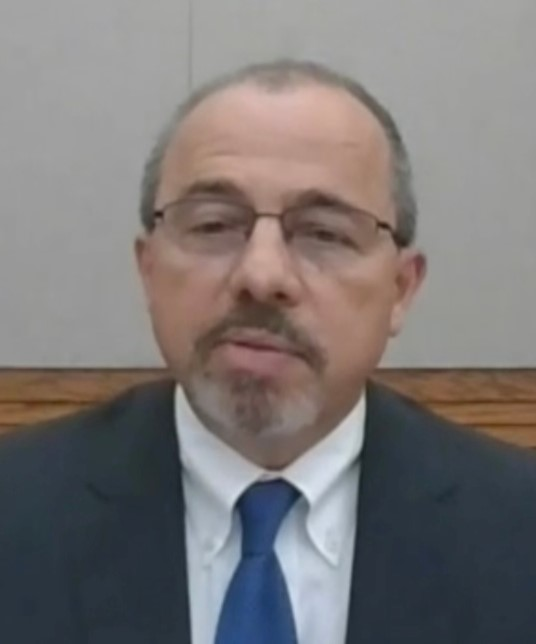

Judge of the United States District Court for the Southern District of Illinois
- Incumbent
- Assumed office September 23, 2020
- Appointed by: Donald Trump
- Preceded by: David R. Herndon

Judge of the Madison County Circuit Court
- In office March 3, 2017 – September 23, 2020
- Appointed by: Supreme Court of Illinois
- Preceded by: John B. Barberis Jr.

Personal details
- Born: David Wayne Dugan; 1960 (age 65–66) Litchfield, Illinois, U.S.
- Party: Republican
- Education: Eastern Illinois University (BA); Valparaiso University (JD)

David Wayne Dugan (born 1960) is a United States district judge of the United States District Court for the Southern District of Illinois.

== Education ==
Dugan earned his Bachelor of Arts from Eastern Illinois University and his Juris Doctor from the Valparaiso University School of Law.

== Career ==
Before becoming a state court judge, Dugan was in private practice for more than 30 years, where his practice focused on personal injury and commercial litigation in both state and federal courts.

=== State judicial service ===
On February 9, 2017, Dugan was appointed by the Supreme Court of Illinois to be a Circuit Judge for the Madison County Circuit Court. He filled the vacancy left by John B. Barberis Jr., who was appointed to the Illinois Appellate Court. The appointment took effect March 3, 2017. Dugan's service on the state court bench ended when he became a federal district judge.

=== Federal judicial service ===
On February 5, 2020, President Donald Trump announced his intent to nominate Dugan to serve as a United States district judge of the United States District Court for the Southern District of Illinois. On February 12, 2020, his nomination was sent to the Senate. President Trump nominated Dugan to the seat vacated by Judge David R. Herndon, who retired on January 7, 2019. A hearing on his nomination before the Senate Judiciary Committee was held on June 24, 2020. On July 30, 2020, his nomination was reported out of committee by a 13–9 vote. On September 16, 2020, the United States Senate invoked cloture on his nomination by a 56–40 vote. His nomination was confirmed later that day by a 55–41 vote. He received his judicial commission on September 23, 2020.

== Memberships ==
Dugan was a member of the Alliance Defending Freedom from 2014 to 2016. He has been a member of the National Rifle Association of America since 2008, the NAACP since 2017, and the Federalist Society since 2017.

Legal offices
Preceded by John B. Barberis Jr.	Judge of the 3rd Judicial Circuit Court of Illinois; 2017–2020	Vacant
Preceded by David R. Herndon	Judge of the United States District Court for the Southern District of Illinois; 2020–present	Incumbent
