= Nancy J. Rosenstengel =

American judge (born 1968)

Nancy Rosenstengel
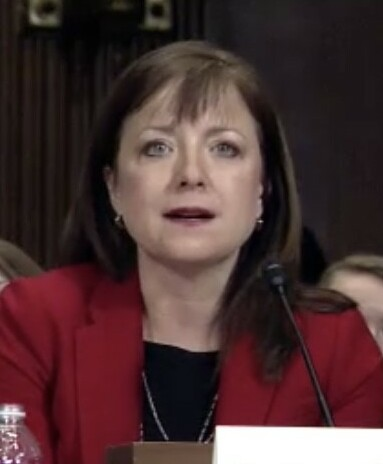
- Rosenstengel in 2014

Chief Judge of the United States District Court for the Southern District of Illinois
- In office April 1, 2019 – December 31, 2025
- Preceded by: Michael Joseph Reagan
- Succeeded by: Staci M. Yandle

Judge of the United States District Court for the Southern District of Illinois
- Incumbent
- Assumed office May 12, 2014
- Appointed by: Barack Obama
- Preceded by: G. Patrick Murphy

Personal details
- Born: Nancy Jo Niemeier; 1968 (age 57–58) Alton, Illinois, U.S.
- Education: University of Illinois, Urbana-Champaign (BA); Southern Illinois University, Carbondale (JD)

Nancy Jo Rosenstengel (née Niemeier; born 1968) is a United States district judge of the United States District Court for the Southern District of Illinois and former clerk of court of the same court.

== Biography ==
Rosenstengel received a Bachelor of Arts degree, cum laude, in 1990 from the University of Illinois at Urbana-Champaign. She received a Juris Doctor, cum laude, in 1993 from the Southern Illinois University School of Law.

She was an associate at the law firm of Sandberg, Phoenix & von Gontard (now Sandberg Phoenix) from 1993 to 1998, where her practice primarily involved products liability, medical malpractice and Jones Act litigation.

From 1998 to 2009, she served as a career law clerk to Judge G. Patrick Murphy of the United States District Court for the Southern District of Illinois. From 2009 to 2014, she served as Clerk of Court in the same district.

=== Federal judicial service ===
On November 7, 2013, President Barack Obama nominated Rosenstengel to serve as a United States district judge of the United States District Court for the Southern District of Illinois, to the seat that was vacated by Judge G. Patrick Murphy, who would assumeme senior status on December 1, 2013.

On February 6, 2014 her nomination was reported out of committee. Cloture was filed on her nomination on May 6, 2014. On Thursday May 8, 2014 the Senate invoked cloture on her nomination by a 54–42 vote. Later that day, her nomination was confirmed by a 95–0 vote.

She received her judicial commission on May 12, 2014. Rosenstengel was sworn in as the judge on May 19, 2014. A formal investiture ceremony occurred on July 2, 2014. She became chief judge on April 1, 2019, after Michael Joseph Reagan retired.

== See also ==
- List of first women lawyers and judges in Illinois

Legal offices
| Preceded by G. Patrick Murphy | Judge of the United States District Court for the Southern District of Illinois; 2014–present | Incumbent |
| Preceded by Michael Joseph Reagan | Chief Judge of the United States District Court for the Southern District of Illinois; 2019–2025 | Succeeded by Staci M. Yandle |
