= John Phil Gilbert =

American judge (born 1949)

Senior Judge of the United States District Court for the Southern District of Illinois
- Incumbent
- Assumed office March 15, 2014

Chief Judge of the United States District Court for the Southern District of Illinois
- In office 1993–2000
- Preceded by: William Donald Stiehl
- Succeeded by: G. Patrick Murphy

Judge of the United States District Court for the Southern District of Illinois
- In office September 24, 1992 – March 15, 2014
- Appointed by: George H. W. Bush
- Preceded by: James L. Foreman
- Succeeded by: Staci M. Yandle

Personal details
- Born: John Phil Gilbert; March 11, 1949 (age 77) Carbondale, Illinois, U.S.
- Party: Republican
- Education: University of Illinois (BS); Loyola University (JD)

John Phil Gilbert (born March 11, 1949) is a senior United States district judge of the United States District Court for the Southern District of Illinois. Gilbert took senior status on March 15, 2014.

== Education and career ==
John Phil Gilbert was born March 11, 1949. Gilbert received a Bachelor of Science degree from the University of Illinois at Urbana–Champaign in 1971 and a Juris Doctor from Loyola University Chicago School of Law in 1974.

Gilbert practiced privately in Carbondale from 1974 to 1988. He also served as a special assistant attorney general in the Public Aid Enforcement Division from 1974 to 1975. From 1975 to 1978, he worked as an assistant city attorney for the City of Carbondale. In addition, he served on the Illinois State Board of Elections from 1978 to 1988, including terms as chairman from 1981 to 1983 and vice-chairman from 1983 to 1985.

== State judicial career ==
Gilbert was appointed a circuit judge of the First Judicial Circuit of Illinois in January 1988 to fill the vacancy created by the retirement of William H. South. He was the Republican candidate for the full six-year term, to which he was elected in the 1988 general election against Democratic nominee Norma J. Beedle. He served on the state court until his appointment to the federal bench.

== Federal judicial service ==
On July 2, 1992, Gilbert was nominated by President George H. W. Bush to a seat on the United States District Court for the Southern District of Illinois vacated by Judge James L. Foreman. Gilbert was confirmed by the United States Senate on September 23, 1992, and was commissioned on September 24, 1992. He served as Chief Judge from 1993 to 2000. He assumed senior status on March 15, 2014.

== Complaints ==
In 2016, an Illinois lawyer filed a complaint arguing that Gilbert should not serve on Southern Illinois University’s board of trustees because it violated the judicial conduct rules, specifically a rule saying judges should not sit on boards of organizations that often appear in court before them or their colleagues. Chief Judge Diane P. Wood agreed with the concern, but Gilbert did not, so a Special Committee was appointed to investigate. Gilbert then agreed to stop hearing cases involving Illinois state employees, and the committee accepted this as appropriate "corrective action."

In 2017, Gilbert had further controversy when it was discovered that his representative during his ethics hearing was former U.S. district judge Patrick Murphy, a common ally of environmental litigator Stephen Tillery, but it was not disclosed in court records. Murphy then appeared as a litigator for Tillery in the court of Gilbert but it was not until five days later that Gilbert disclosed he had been a client.

== Sources ==
Legal offices
Preceded by James L. Foreman	Judge of the United States District Court for the Southern District of Illinois; 1992–2014	Succeeded by Staci M. Yandle
Preceded by William Donald Stiehl	Chief Judge of the United States District Court for the Southern District of Illinois; 1993–2000	Succeeded by G. Patrick Murphy
