= William L. Beatty =

American judge

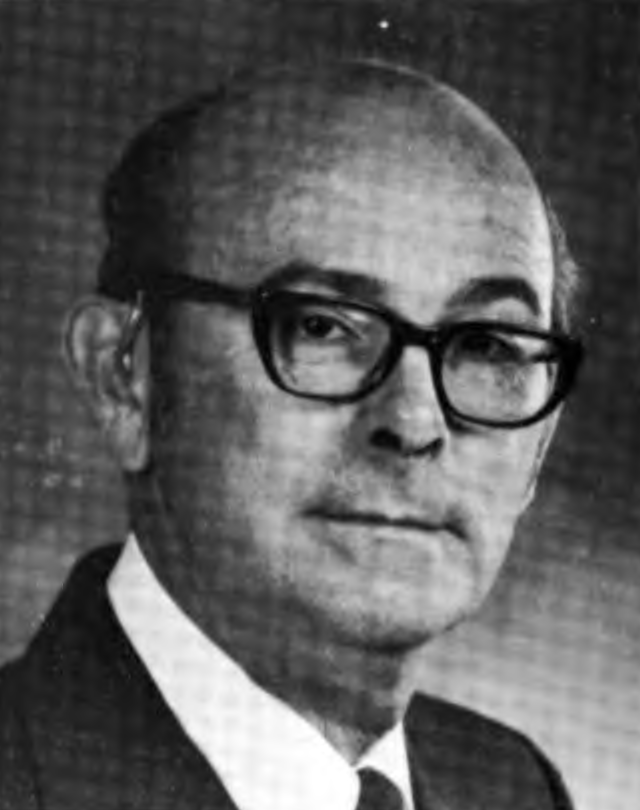

Senior Judge of the United States District Court for the Southern District of Illinois
- In office November 9, 1992 – July 22, 2001

Judge of the United States District Court for the Southern District of Illinois
- In office October 5, 1979 – November 9, 1992
- Appointed by: Jimmy Carter
- Preceded by: Seat established by 93 Stat. 6
- Succeeded by: David R. Herndon

Personal details
- Born: William Louis Beatty; September 4, 1925 Mendota, Illinois, US
- Died: July 22, 2001 (aged 75) Edwardsville, Illinois, US
- Education: Saint Louis University School of Law (LLB)

William Louis Beatty (September 4, 1925 – July 22, 2001) was a United States district judge of the United States District Court for the Southern District of Illinois.

== Education and career ==
Born in Mendota, Illinois and raised in East St. Louis, Missouri. He graduated from Central Catholic High School. He joined the army in 1943 and served in the 394th Field Artillery Battalion in Europe during World War II. He was discharged in 1946, then received a Bachelor of Laws from the Saint Louis University School of Law in 1950. He was in private practice in Granite City, Illinois from 1950 to 1968, and was a circuit judge in Madison County, Illinois from 1968 to 1979.

== Federal judicial service ==
On July 31, 1979, Beatty was nominated by President Jimmy Carter to a new seat on the United States District Court for the Southern District of Illinois created by 93 Stat. 6. He was confirmed by the United States Senate on October 4, 1979, and received his commission on October 5, 1979. He assumed senior status on November 9, 1992, serving in that capacity until his death, on July 22, 2001, in Edwardsville, Illinois.

== Sources ==
Legal offices
Preceded by Seat established by 93 Stat. 6	Judge of the United States District Court for the Southern District of Illinois; 1979–1992	Succeeded by David R. Herndon
