= William J. Allen =

American judge (1829–1901)

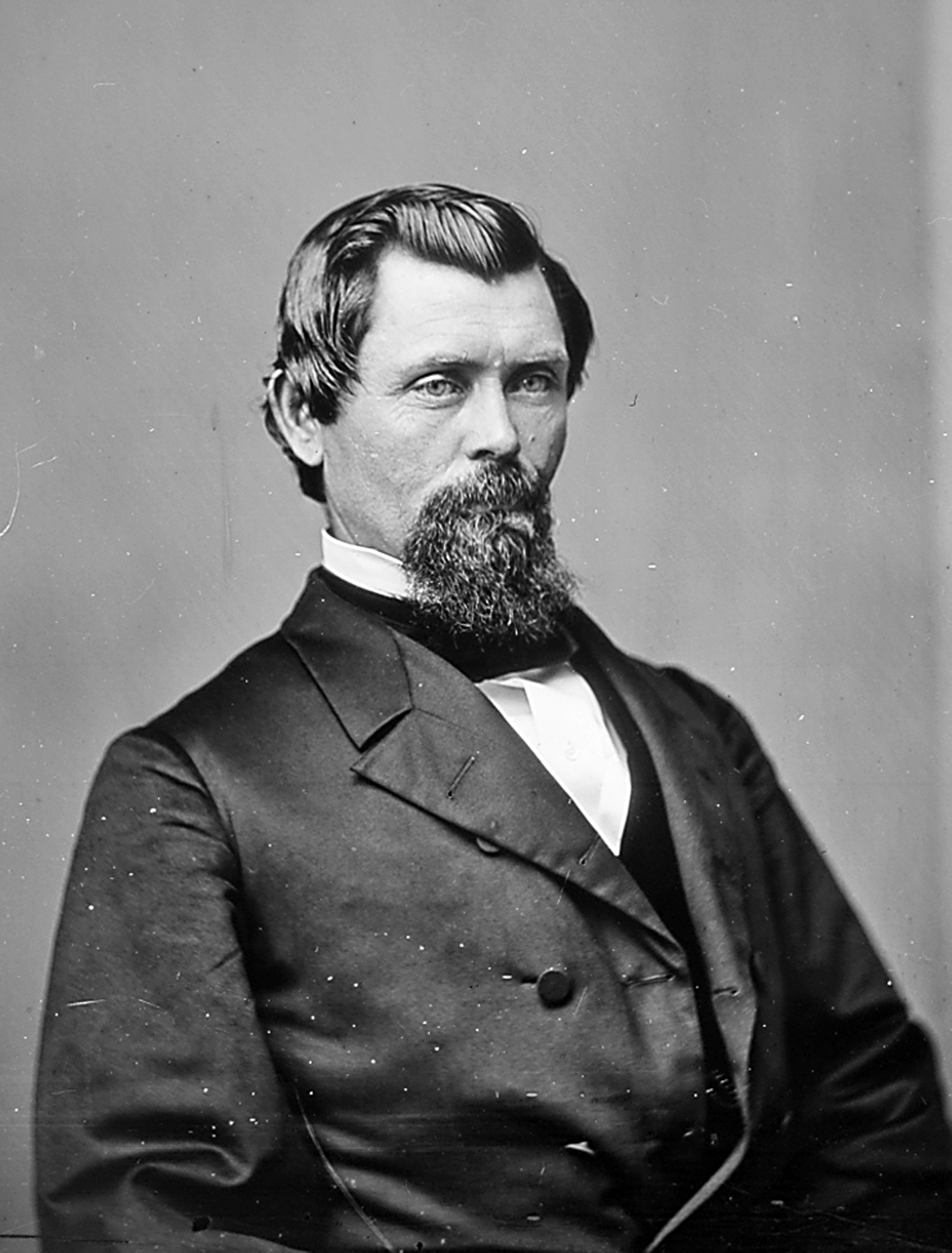

Judge of the United States District Court for the Southern District of Illinois
- In office April 18, 1887 – January 26, 1901
- Appointed by: Grover Cleveland
- Preceded by: Samuel Hubbel Treat Jr.
- Succeeded by: J. Otis Humphrey

Member of the U.S. House of Representatives from Illinois
- In office June 2, 1862 – March 3, 1865
- Preceded by: John A. Logan (9th); District established (13th)
- Succeeded by: Lewis W. Ross (9th); Andrew J. Kuykendall (13th)
- Constituency: 9th district (1862-63); 13th district (1863-65)

Member of the Illinois House of Representatives from the 3rd district
- In office January 1, 1855 – January 5, 1857
- Preceded by: David B. Russell
- Succeeded by: Thomas Jones

Personal details
- Born: William Joshua Allen; June 9, 1829 Wilson County, Tennessee, US
- Died: January 26, 1901 (aged 71) Hot Springs, Arkansas, US
- Resting place: Oak Ridge Cemetery; Springfield, Illinois, US
- Party: Democratic
- Parent: Willis Allen (father)
- Education: University of Louisville School of Law (LL.B.)
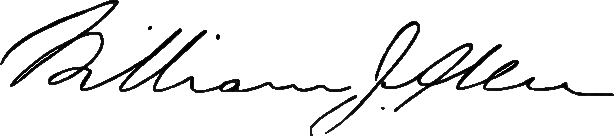
- Signature

William Joshua Allen (June 9, 1829 – January 26, 1901), frequently known as W. J. Allen, was an American lawyer, jurist, and politician. He served as a United States representative from Illinois and a United States district judge of the United States District Court for the Southern District of Illinois.

== Education and career ==
Born on June 9, 1829, in Wilson County, Tennessee, Allen moved with his father to Franklin County (now Williamson County), Illinois about 1830, and in 1839 settled in Marion, Illinois and attended the common schools.

He received a Bachelor of Laws in 1848 from the University of Louisville Law Department (now the University of Louisville School of Law. He was an enrolling and engrossing clerk for the Illinois General Assembly in 1849 and 1851. He was admitted to the bar and entered private practice in Metropolis, Illinois from 1849 to 1853.

He was prosecuting attorney for the Twenty-Sixth Judicial Circuit of Illinois from 1853 to 1854. He resumed private practice in Marion from 1853 to 1862. He was a member of the Illinois House of Representatives of the 3rd district from 1855 to 1857. He was the United States Attorney for the Southern District of Illinois from 1855 to 1859. He was a Judge of the Illinois Circuit Court for the Twenty-Sixth Judicial Circuit from 1859 to 1861.

== Congressional service ==
Allen was elected as a Democrat from Illinois's 9th congressional district to the United States House of Representatives of the 37th United States Congress to fill the vacancy caused by the resignation of United States Representative John A. Logan. He was reelected from Illinois's 13th congressional district to the 38th United States Congress and served from June 2, 1862, to March 3, 1865. He was not a candidate for reelection in 1864.

== Later career ==
Following his departure from Congress, Allen resumed private practice in Cairo, Illinois from 1865 to 1874, in Carbondale, Illinois from 1874 to 1886, and in Springfield, Illinois from 1886 to 1887. He was a member of the Illinois state constitutional conventions in 1862 and 1870. He was a delegate to all Democratic National Conventions from 1864 to 1888.

== Federal judicial service ==
Allen received a recess appointment from President Grover Cleveland on April 18, 1887, to a seat on the United States District Court for the Southern District of Illinois vacated by Judge Samuel Hubbel Treat Jr. He was nominated to the same position by President Cleveland on December 20, 1887. He was confirmed by the United States Senate on January 19, 1888, and received his commission the same day. His service terminated on January 26, 1901, due to his death while on a visit to Hot Springs, Arkansas. He was interred in Oak Ridge Cemetery in Springfield.

== Family ==
Allen was the son of Willis Allen, also a United States representative from Illinois.

== Sources ==
- United States Congress. "William J. Allen (id: A000152)". Biographical Directory of the United States Congress.
- William Joshua Allen at the Biographical Directory of Federal Judges, a publication of the Federal Judicial Center.
- "Allen, William Joshua". The Biographical Dictionary of America. Vol. 1. 1906. p. 92.
- This article incorporates public domain material from Biographical Directory of the United States Congress. Federal government of the United States.

U.S. House of Representatives
| Preceded by John A. Logan | Member of the U.S. House of Representatives from Illinois's 9th congressional district 1862–1863 | Succeeded by Lewis Winans Ross |
| Preceded by District established | Member of the U.S. House of Representatives from Illinois's 13th congressional district 1863–1865 | Succeeded by Andrew J. Kuykendall |
Legal offices
| Preceded by Samuel Hubbel Treat Jr. | Judge of the United States District Court for the Southern District of Illinois; 1887–1901 | Succeeded by J. Otis Humphrey |
