= List of federal judges appointed by Bill Clinton =

Following is a list of all Article III United States federal judges appointed by President Bill Clinton during his presidency. In total Clinton appointed 378 Article III federal judges, including two justices to the Supreme Court of the United States, 66 judges to the United States courts of appeals, 305 judges to the United States district courts and 5 judges to the United States Court of International Trade. Clinton's total of 378 judicial appointments is the second most in American history behind Ronald Reagan, and his 305 district court judges is a record.

Additionally, eight Article I federal judge appointments are listed, including one judge to the United States Court of Appeals for Veterans Claims and seven judges to the United States Tax Court. This is not a complete list of Clinton's Article I federal judge appointments.

26 of Clinton's appointees remain in active service, nine appellate judges and seventeen district judges. Two additional judges named by Clinton to district courts remain in active service as appellate judges by appointment of later presidents, as is one appellate judge appointed to the Supreme Court.

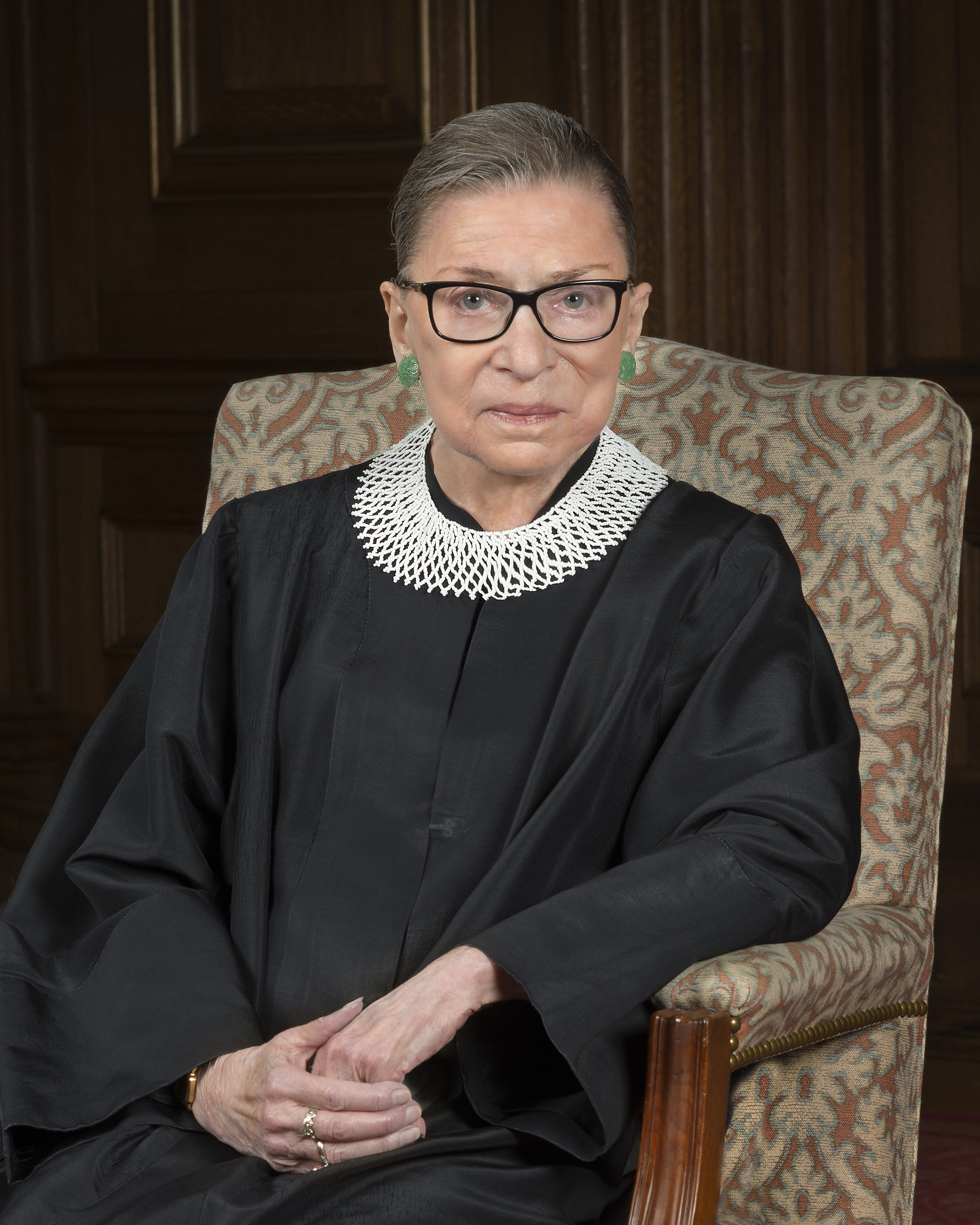
Ruth Bader Ginsburg, Clinton's first appointee to the Supreme Court

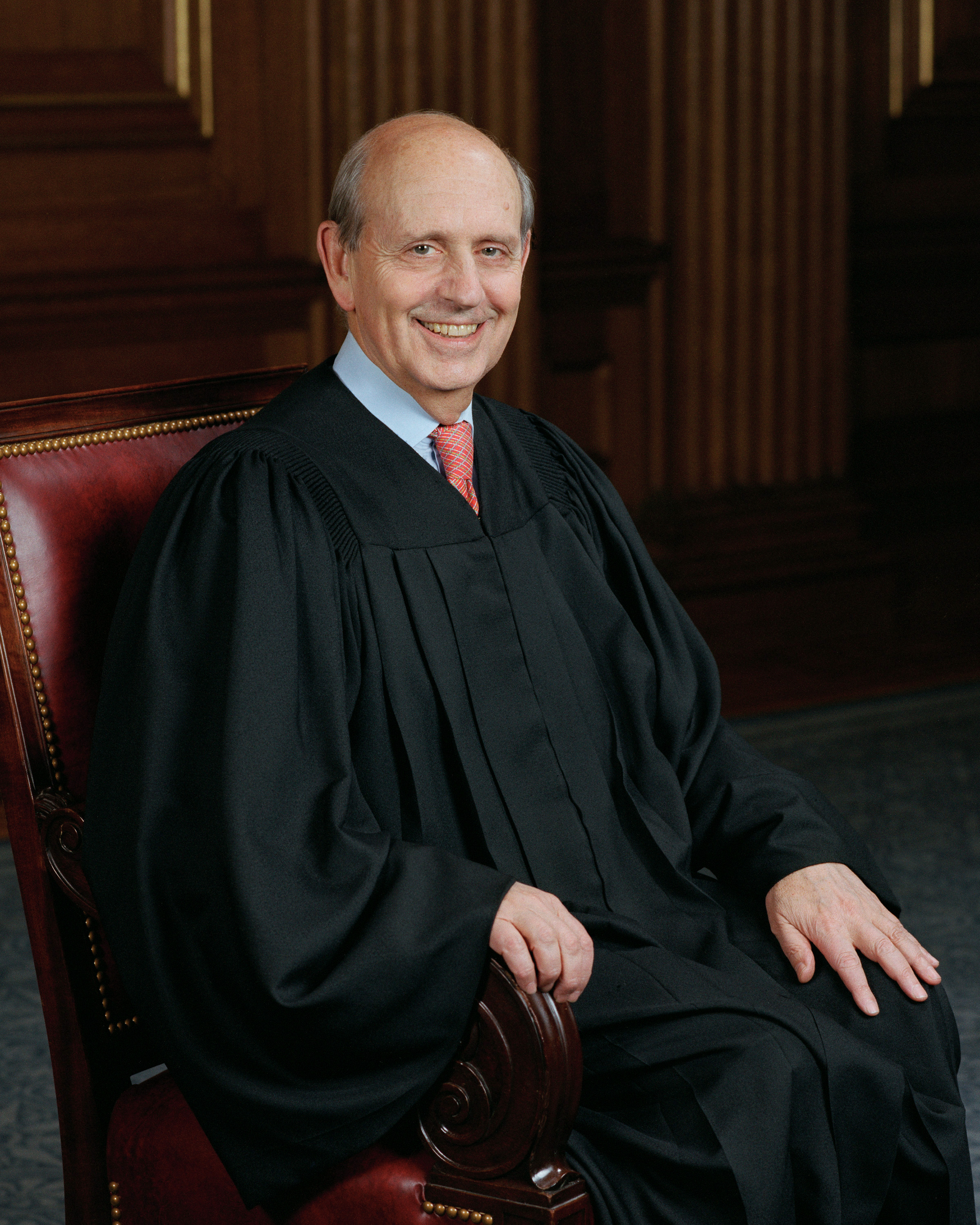
Stephen Breyer, Clinton's second appointee to the Supreme Court

== United States Supreme Court justices ==
Speculation abounded over potential Clinton nominations to the Supreme Court even before his presidency officially began, given the advanced ages of several justices. On March 19, 1993, Justice Byron White announced his retirement effective at the end of the Supreme Court's 1992–1993 term.

President Clinton announced Ruth Bader Ginsburg as White's replacement on June 15, 1993, and she was confirmed by the United States Senate on August 3, 1993.

On April 6, 1994, Associate Justice Harry Blackmun announced his retirement, which ultimately took effect August 3, 1994. President Clinton announced Stephen Breyer as Blackmun's replacement on May 13, 1994, with the United States Senate confirming Breyer on July 29, 1994.

#	Justice	Seat	State	Former justice	Nomination date	Confirmation date	Confirmation vote	Began service	Ended service	Ended retired service
1	Ruth Bader Ginsburg	6	New York	Byron White	June 22, 1993	August 3, 1993	96–3	August 5, 1993	September 18, 2020	–
2	Stephen Breyer	2	Massachusetts	Harry Blackmun	May 17, 1994	July 29, 1994	87–9	August 3, 1994	June 30, 2022	Incumbent

== Courts of appeals ==
#	Judge	Circuit	Nomination date	Confirmation date	Confirmation vote	Began active service	Ended active service	Ended senior status
1	M. Blane Michael	Fourth	August 6, 1993	September 30, 1993	voice vote	October 1, 1993	March 25, 2011	–
2	Pierre N. Leval	Second	August 6, 1993	October 18, 1993	voice vote	October 20, 1993	August 16, 2002	Incumbent
3	Martha Craig Daughtrey	Sixth	August 6, 1993	November 20, 1993	voice vote	November 22, 1993	January 1, 2009	Incumbent
4	Judith W. Rogers	D.C.	November 17, 1993	March 10, 1994	voice vote	March 11, 1994	September 1, 2022	Incumbent
5	Rosemary Barkett	Eleventh	September 24, 1993	April 14, 1994	61–37	April 15, 1994	September 30, 2013	–
6	Fortunato Benavides	Fifth	January 27, 1994	May 6, 1994	voice vote	May 9, 1994	February 3, 2012	May 5, 2023
7	Carl E. Stewart	Fifth	January 27, 1994	May 6, 1994	voice vote	May 9, 1994	Incumbent	–
8	Robert Harlan Henry	Tenth	February 9, 1994	May 6, 1994	voice vote	May 9, 1994	June 30, 2010	–
9	Theodore McKee	Third	March 22, 1994	June 8, 1994	voice vote	June 9, 1994	October 20, 2022	Incumbent
10	Robert Manley Parker	Fifth	January 27, 1994	June 15, 1994	voice vote	June 16, 1994	November 1, 2002	–
11	Diana Gribbon Motz	Fourth	January 27, 1994	June 15, 1994	voice vote	June 16, 1994	September 30, 2022	Incumbent
12	Guido Calabresi	Second	February 9, 1994	July 18, 1994	voice vote	July 21, 1994	July 21, 2009	Incumbent
13	José A. Cabranes	Second	May 24, 1994	August 9, 1994	voice vote	August 10, 1994	March 9, 2023	Incumbent
14	Michael Daly Hawkins	Ninth	July 13, 1994	September 14, 1994	voice vote	September 15, 1994	February 12, 2010	Incumbent
15	William Curtis Bryson	Federal	June 22, 1994	September 28, 1994	voice vote	September 29, 1994	January 7, 2013	Incumbent
16	H. Lee Sarokin	Third	May 5, 1994	October 4, 1994	63–35	October 5, 1994	July 31, 1996	–
17	David S. Tatel	D.C.	June 20, 1994	October 7, 1994	voice vote	October 7, 1994	May 16, 2022	January 16, 2024
18	Diana E. Murphy	Eighth	July 28, 1994	October 7, 1994	voice vote	October 11, 1994	November 29, 2016	May 16, 2018
19	Fred I. Parker	Second	August 25, 1994	October 7, 1994	voice vote	October 11, 1994	August 12, 2003	–
20	Sandra Lynch	First	September 14, 1994 (Note: Renominated on January 11, 1995, after initial nomination expired.)	March 17, 1995	voice vote	March 17, 1995	December 31, 2022	Incumbent
21	Karen Nelson Moore	Sixth	September 14, 1994 (Note: Renominated on January 24, 1995, after initial nomination expired.)	March 24, 1995	voice vote	March 24, 1995	Incumbent	–
22	Mary Beck Briscoe	Tenth	March 14, 1995	May 25, 1995	voice vote	May 26, 1995	March 15, 2021	Incumbent
23	Carlos F. Lucero	Tenth	March 23, 1995	June 30, 1995	voice vote	June 30, 1995	February 1, 2021	Incumbent
24	Diane Wood	Seventh	March 31, 1995	June 30, 1995	voice vote	June 30, 1995	September 7, 2022	April 30, 2024
25	Terence T. Evans	Seventh	April 25, 1995	August 11, 1995	voice vote	August 11, 1995	January 7, 2010	August 10, 2011
26	Michael R. Murphy	Tenth	July 25, 1995	August 11, 1995	voice vote	August 14, 1995	December 31, 2012	Incumbent
27	James L. Dennis	Fifth	June 8, 1994 (Note: Renominated on January 31, 1995, after initial nomination expired.)	September 28, 1995	voice vote	October 2, 1995	December 16, 2022	Incumbent
28	R. Guy Cole Jr.	Sixth	June 29, 1995	December 22, 1995	voice vote	December 26, 1995	January 9, 2023	Incumbent
29	A. Wallace Tashima	Ninth	April 6, 1995	January 2, 1996	voice vote	January 4, 1996	June 30, 2004	Incumbent
30	Sidney R. Thomas	Ninth	July 19, 1995	January 2, 1996	voice vote	January 4, 1996	May 4, 2023	Incumbent
31	Merrick Garland	D.C.	September 5, 1995 (Note: Renominated on January 7, 1997, after initial nomination expired.)	March 19, 1997	76–23	March 20, 1997	March 11, 2021	–
32	Eric L. Clay	Sixth	March 6, 1996 (Note: Renominated on May 7, 1997, after initial nomination expired.)	July 31, 1997	voice vote	August 1, 1997	Incumbent	–
33	Arthur J. Gajarsa	Federal	April 18, 1996	July 31, 1997	voice vote	August 1, 1997	July 31, 2011	June 30, 2012
34	Frank M. Hull	Eleventh	June 18, 1997	September 4, 1997	96–0	September 18, 1997	December 31, 2017	Incumbent
35	Marjorie Rendell	Third	January 7, 1997	September 26, 1997	voice vote	September 29, 1997	July 1, 2015	Incumbent
36	Ronald Lee Gilman	Sixth	July 16, 1997	November 6, 1997	98–1	November 7, 1997	November 21, 2010	Incumbent
37	Stanley Marcus	Eleventh	September 25, 1997	November 7, 1997	voice vote	November 12, 1997	December 5, 2019	Incumbent
38	Barry G. Silverman	Ninth	November 8, 1997	January 28, 1998	voice vote	February 4, 1998	October 11, 2016	Incumbent
39	Susan P. Graber	Ninth	July 30, 1997	March 17, 1998	98–0	March 19, 1998	December 15, 2021	Incumbent
40	M. Margaret McKeown	Ninth	March 29, 1996	March 27, 1998	80–11	April 8, 1998	September 15, 2022	Incumbent
41	Kermit Lipez	First	October 20, 1997	April 2, 1998	voice vote	April 7, 1998	December 31, 2011	Incumbent
42	Chester J. Straub	Second	February 11, 1998	June 1, 1998	voice vote	June 3, 1998	July 16, 2008	July 13, 2024
43	Rosemary S. Pooler	Second	November 6, 1997	June 2, 1998	voice vote	June 3, 1998	March 23, 2022	August 10, 2023
44	Robert D. Sack	Second	November 6, 1997	June 15, 1998	voice vote	June 16, 1998	August 6, 2009	Incumbent
45	John David Kelly	Eighth	January 27, 1998	July 31, 1998	voice vote	August 3, 1998	October 21, 1998	–
46	Kim McLane Wardlaw	Ninth	January 27, 1998	July 31, 1998	voice vote	August 3, 1998	Incumbent	–
47	William Byrd Traxler Jr.	Fourth	July 10, 1998	September 28, 1998	voice vote	October 1, 1998	August 31, 2018	Incumbent
48	Sonia Sotomayor	Second	June 25, 1997	October 2, 1998	67–29	October 7, 1998	August 7, 2009	Elevated
49	William A. Fletcher	Ninth	April 25, 1995	October 8, 1998	57–41	October 9, 1998	January 24, 2022	Incumbent
50	Robert Bruce King	Fourth	June 24, 1998	October 8, 1998	voice vote	October 9, 1998	Incumbent	–
51	Robert Katzmann	Second	March 8, 1999	July 14, 1999	voice vote	July 16, 1999	January 21, 2021	June 9, 2021
52	Charles R. Wilson	Eleventh	May 27, 1999	July 30, 1999	voice vote	August 9, 1999	December 31, 2024	Incumbent
53	Maryanne Trump Barry	Third	June 17, 1999	September 13, 1999	voice vote	September 22, 1999	June 30, 2011	February 11, 2019
54	Raymond C. Fisher	Ninth	March 15, 1999	October 5, 1999	69–29	October 12, 1999	April 1, 2013	February 29, 2020
55	Ann Claire Williams	Seventh	August 5, 1999	November 10, 1999	voice vote	November 15, 1999	June 5, 2017	January 16, 2018
56	Ronald M. Gould	Ninth	November 8, 1997 (Note: Renominated on January 26, 1999, after initial nomination expired.)	November 17, 1999	voice vote	November 22, 1999	Incumbent	–
57	Richard Linn	Federal	September 28, 1999	November 19, 1999	voice vote	November 22, 1999	October 31, 2012	Incumbent
58	Thomas L. Ambro	Third	September 28, 1999	February 10, 2000	96–2	February 16, 2000	February 6, 2023	Incumbent
59	Kermit Edward Bye	Eighth	April 22, 1999	February 24, 2000	98–0	March 9, 2000	April 22, 2015	September 1, 2016
60	Julio M. Fuentes	Third	March 8, 1999	March 7, 2000	93–0	March 9, 2000	July 18, 2016	Incumbent
61	Marsha Berzon	Ninth	January 27, 1998	March 9, 2000	64–34	March 16, 2000	January 23, 2022	Incumbent
62	Richard Paez	Ninth	January 24, 1996 (Note: Renominated on January 7, 1997, and January 26, 1999.)	March 9, 2000	59–39	March 14, 2000	December 13, 2021	Incumbent
63	Timothy B. Dyk	Federal	April 1, 1998	May 24, 2000	74–25	May 25, 2000	Incumbent	–
64	Richard Tallman	Ninth	October 20, 1999	May 24, 2000	voice vote	May 25, 2000	March 3, 2018	Incumbent
65	Johnnie B. Rawlinson	Ninth	February 22, 2000	July 21, 2000	voice vote	July 26, 2000	Incumbent	–
66	Roger Gregory	Fourth	June 30, 2000 (Note: Renominated on January 3, 2001, after initial nomination expired. Was later withdrawn on March 19, 2001, by President Bush.)	N/A	N/A	December 27, 2000 (Note: Recess appointment; subsequently nominated by George W. Bush on May 9, 2001, confirmed by the Senate on July 20, 2001, and received commission on July 25, 2001.)	Incumbent	–

== District courts ==
#	Judge	Court (Note: See List of United States district and territorial courts)	Nomination date	Confirmation date	Confirmation vote	Began active service	Ended active service	Ended senior status
1	Jennifer B. Coffman	E.D. Ky. W.D. Ky.	August 6, 1993	September 30, 1993	voice vote	October 1, 1993	January 8, 2013	–
2	Martha Vázquez	D.N.M.	August 6, 1993	September 30, 1993	voice vote	October 1, 1993	December 17, 2021	Incumbent
3	Billy Roy Wilson	E.D. Ark.	August 6, 1993	September 30, 1993	voice vote	October 1, 1993	October 1, 2008	October 27, 2025
4	Leonie Brinkema	E.D. Va.	August 6, 1993	October 18, 1993	voice vote	October 20, 1993	Incumbent	–
5	Deborah K. Chasanow	D. Md.	August 6, 1993	October 18, 1993	voice vote	October 20, 1993	October 3, 2014	Incumbent
6	Peter J. Messitte	D. Md.	August 6, 1993	October 18, 1993	voice vote	October 20, 1993	September 1, 2008	January 11, 2025
7	Henry Lee Adams Jr.	M.D. Fla.	October 29, 1993	November 20, 1993	voice vote	November 24, 1993	April 8, 2010	Incumbent
8	Donetta Ambrose	W.D. Pa.	October 25, 1993	November 20, 1993	voice vote	November 24, 1993	November 5, 2010	Incumbent
9	Harry F. Barnes	W.D. Ark.	October 27, 1993	November 20, 1993	voice vote	November 22, 1993	November 1, 2008	February 27, 2019
10	Susan C. Bucklew	M.D. Fla.	October 29, 1993	November 20, 1993	voice vote	November 24, 1993	August 1, 2008	Incumbent
11	Wilkie D. Ferguson	S.D. Fla.	October 25, 1993	November 20, 1993	voice vote	November 22, 1993	June 9, 2003	–
12	David Warner Hagen	D. Nev.	October 7, 1993	November 20, 1993	voice vote	November 22, 1993	November 28, 2003	March 31, 2005
13	Raymond Alvin Jackson	E.D. Va.	September 24, 1993	November 20, 1993	voice vote	November 22, 1993	November 23, 2021	Incumbent
14	Gary L. Lancaster	W.D. Pa.	October 25, 1993	November 20, 1993	voice vote	November 24, 1993	April 24, 2013	–
15	Reginald C. Lindsay	D. Mass.	October 27, 1993	November 20, 1993	voice vote	November 24, 1993	March 12, 2009	–
16	Lawrence L. Piersol	D.S.D.	August 6, 1993	November 20, 1993	voice vote	November 22, 1993	July 31, 2009	Incumbent
17	Patti B. Saris	D. Mass.	October 27, 1993	November 20, 1993	voice vote	November 24, 1993	December 2, 2024	Incumbent
18	Allen G. Schwartz	S.D.N.Y.	October 27, 1993	November 20, 1993	voice vote	November 22, 1993	March 22, 2003	–
19	Joanna Seybert	E.D.N.Y.	September 24, 1993 (Note: Previously nominated by President Bush on July 27, 1992. That nomination expired at the end of the term. Renominated on September 24, 1993, by President Clinton.)	November 20, 1993	voice vote	November 24, 1993	January 13, 2014	Incumbent
20	Thomas Michael Shanahan	D. Neb.	August 6, 1993	November 20, 1993	voice vote	November 22, 1993	May 5, 2004	December 27, 2011
21	Charles Alexander Shaw	E.D. Mo.	October 25, 1993	November 20, 1993	voice vote	November 22, 1993	December 31, 2009	April 12, 2020
22	Richard G. Stearns	D. Mass.	October 27, 1993	November 20, 1993	voice vote	November 24, 1993	Incumbent	–
23	David G. Trager	E.D.N.Y.	August 6, 1993 (Note: Previously nominated by President Bush on November 27, 1991. That nomination expired at the end of the term. Renominated on August 6, 1993, by President Clinton.)	November 20, 1993	voice vote	November 24, 1993	March 1, 2006	January 5, 2011
24	Claudia Ann Wilken	N.D. Cal.	October 7, 1993	November 20, 1993	voice vote	November 22, 1993	December 17, 2014	Incumbent
25	Nancy Gertner	D. Mass.	October 27, 1993	February 10, 1994	voice vote	February 14, 1994	May 22, 2011	September 1, 2011
26	Tucker L. Melancon	W.D. La.	November 18, 1993	February 10, 1994	voice vote	February 11, 1994	February 14, 2009	Incumbent
27	Michael Ponsor	D. Mass.	November 19, 1993	February 10, 1994	voice vote	February 14, 1994	August 15, 2011	Incumbent
28	Marjorie Rendell	E.D. Pa.	November 19, 1993	February 10, 1994	voice vote	February 11, 1994	November 20, 1997	Elevated
29	Thomas I. Vanaskie	M.D. Pa.	November 17, 1993	February 10, 1994	voice vote	February 11, 1994	April 28, 2010	Elevated
30	Lesley B. Wells	N.D. Ohio	November 19, 1993	February 10, 1994	voice vote	February 11, 1994	February 14, 2006	October 2, 2015
31	Helen Ginger Berrigan	E.D. La.	November 18, 1993	March 10, 1994	voice vote	March 10, 1994	August 23, 2016	November 15, 2024
32	Samuel Frederick Biery Jr.	W.D. Tex.	November 19, 1993	March 10, 1994	voice vote	March 11, 1994	Incumbent	–
33	Cameron McGowan Currie	D.S.C.	January 27, 1994	March 10, 1994	voice vote	March 11, 1994	October 3, 2013	Incumbent
34	William Royal Furgeson Jr.	W.D. Tex.	November 19, 1993	March 10, 1994	voice vote	March 11, 1994	November 30, 2008	May 31, 2013
35	Orlando Luis Garcia	W.D. Tex.	November 19, 1993	March 10, 1994	voice vote	March 11, 1994	Incumbent	–
36	Daniel T. K. Hurley	S.D. Fla.	November 10, 1993	March 10, 1994	voice vote	March 11, 1994	February 24, 2009	Incumbent
37	Janis Graham Jack	S.D. Tex.	November 19, 1993	March 10, 1994	voice vote	March 11, 1994	June 1, 2011	Incumbent
38	John H. Hannah Jr.	E.D. Tex.	November 19, 1993	March 10, 1994	voice vote	March 11, 1994	December 4, 2003	–
39	Frank Burgess	W.D. Wash.	November 19, 1993	March 25, 1994	voice vote	March 28, 1994	March 9, 2005	March 26, 2010
40	Michael J. Davis	D. Minn.	November 19, 1993	March 25, 1994	voice vote	March 28, 1994	August 1, 2015	Incumbent
41	Ancer L. Haggerty	D. Ore.	November 19, 1993	March 25, 1994	voice vote	March 28, 1994	August 26, 2009	Incumbent
42	Deborah Batts	S.D.N.Y.	January 27, 1994	May 6, 1994	voice vote	May 9, 1994	April 13, 2012	February 3, 2020
43	James G. Carr	N.D. Ohio	January 27, 1994	May 6, 1994	voice vote	May 9, 1994	June 1, 2010	Incumbent
44	Rubén Castillo	N.D. Ill.	January 27, 1994	May 6, 1994	voice vote	May 9, 1994	September 27, 2019	–
45	Audrey B. Collins	C.D. Cal.	January 27, 1994	May 6, 1994	voice vote	May 9, 1994	August 1, 2014	–
46	Clarence Cooper	N.D. Ga.	March 9, 1994	May 6, 1994	voice vote	May 9, 1994	February 9, 2009	Incumbent
47	Frank M. Hull	N.D. Ga.	February 9, 1994	May 6, 1994	voice vote	May 9, 1994	October 2, 1997	Elevated
48	Mary M. Lisi	D.R.I.	January 27, 1994	May 6, 1994	voice vote	May 9, 1994	October 1, 2015	Incumbent
49	Solomon Oliver Jr.	N.D. Ohio	March 9, 1994	May 6, 1994	voice vote	May 9, 1994	February 15, 2021	Incumbent
50	Willie Louis Sands	M.D. Ga.	February 9, 1994	May 6, 1994	voice vote	May 9, 1994	April 12, 2014	Incumbent
51	Michael Burrage	E.D. Okla. N.D. Okla. W.D. Okla.	March 9, 1994	June 8, 1994	voice vote	June 9, 1994	March 1, 2001	–
52	Vanessa Gilmore	S.D. Tex.	March 22, 1994	June 8, 1994	voice vote	June 9, 1994	January 2, 2022	–
53	Terence C. Kern	N.D. Okla.	March 9, 1994	June 8, 1994	voice vote	June 9, 1994	January 4, 2010	Incumbent
54	William F. Downes	D. Wyo.	May 5, 1994	June 15, 1994	voice vote	June 16, 1994	July 24, 2011	–
55	Paul L. Friedman	D.D.C.	March 22, 1994	June 15, 1994	voice vote	June 16, 1994	December 31, 2009	Incumbent
56	Denise Page Hood	E.D. Mich.	March 9, 1994	June 15, 1994	voice vote	June 16, 1994	May 1, 2022	Incumbent
57	Gladys Kessler	D.D.C.	March 22, 1994	June 15, 1994	voice vote	June 16, 1994	January 22, 2007	March 16, 2023
58	Richard Paez	C.D. Cal.	March 9, 1994	June 15, 1994	voice vote	June 16, 1994	March 17, 2000	Elevated
59	Emmet G. Sullivan	D.D.C.	March 22, 1994	June 15, 1994	voice vote	June 16, 1994	April 3, 2021	Incumbent
60	Ricardo M. Urbina	D.D.C.	March 22, 1994	June 15, 1994	voice vote	June 16, 1994	January 31, 2011	May 31, 2012
61	Harold Baer Jr.	S.D.N.Y.	April 26, 1994	August 9, 1994	voice vote	August 10, 1994	September 8, 2004	May 27, 2014
62	Mark W. Bennett	N.D. Iowa	June 21, 1994	August 9, 1994	voice vote	August 26, 1994	June 4, 2015	March 2, 2019
63	Paul D. Borman	E.D. Mich.	March 24, 1994	August 9, 1994	voice vote	August 10, 1994	August 1, 2023	Incumbent
64	Denny Chin	S.D.N.Y.	March 24, 1994	August 9, 1994	voice vote	August 10, 1994	April 23, 2010	Elevated
65	Denise Cote	S.D.N.Y.	April 26, 1994	August 9, 1994	voice vote	August 10, 1994	December 15, 2011	Incumbent
66	Lewis A. Kaplan	S.D.N.Y.	May 5, 1994	August 9, 1994	voice vote	August 10, 1994	February 1, 2011	Incumbent
67	John G. Koeltl	S.D.N.Y.	April 26, 1994	August 9, 1994	voice vote	August 10, 1994	Incumbent	–
68	Blanche M. Manning	N.D. Ill.	May 5, 1994	August 9, 1994	voice vote	August 10, 1994	February 1, 2010	September 20, 2020
69	Rosemary S. Pooler	N.D.N.Y.	April 26, 1994	August 9, 1994	voice vote	August 10, 1994	June 9, 1998	Elevated
70	Alexander Williams Jr.	D. Md.	August 6, 1993	August 17, 1994	voice vote	August 18, 1994	May 8, 2013	January 3, 2014
71	Napoleon A. Jones Jr.	S.D. Cal.	June 8, 1994	September 14, 1994	voice vote	September 15, 1994	September 19, 2007	December 12, 2009
72	John Corbett O'Meara	E.D. Mich.	April 26, 1994	September 14, 1994	voice vote	September 15, 1994	January 1, 2007	October 5, 2024
73	Barrington D. Parker Jr.	S.D.N.Y.	April 26, 1994	September 14, 1994	voice vote	September 15, 1994	October 18, 2001	Elevated
74	Robert Timlin	C.D. Cal.	April 26, 1994	September 14, 1994	voice vote	September 15, 1994	February 1, 2005	January 17, 2017
75	Frederic Block	E.D.N.Y.	July 22, 1994	September 28, 1994	voice vote	September 29, 1994	September 1, 2005	Incumbent
76	Salvador E. Casellas	D.P.R.	June 21, 1994	September 28, 1994	voice vote	September 29, 1994	June 10, 2005	November 22, 2017
77	Robert Chatigny	D. Conn.	August 5, 1994	September 28, 1994	voice vote	September 29, 1994	January 1, 2017	Incumbent
78	Daniel R. Domínguez	D.P.R.	June 21, 1994	September 28, 1994	voice vote	September 29, 1994	July 31, 2011	January 2, 2024
79	Stanwood Duval	E.D. La.	July 15, 1994	September 28, 1994	voice vote	September 29, 1994	December 15, 2008	January 31, 2017
80	John Gleeson	E.D.N.Y.	July 22, 1994	September 28, 1994	voice vote	September 29, 1994	March 9, 2016	–
81	Allyne R. Ross	E.D.N.Y.	July 22, 1994	September 28, 1994	voice vote	September 29, 1994	April 5, 2011	Incumbent
82	Shira Scheindlin	S.D.N.Y.	July 28, 1994	September 28, 1994	voice vote	September 29, 1994	August 16, 2011	April 29, 2016
83	Sarah S. Vance	E.D. La.	June 8, 1994	September 28, 1994	voice vote	September 29, 1994	January 16, 2024	Incumbent
84	James A. Beaty Jr.	M.D.N.C.	August 25, 1994	October 7, 1994	voice vote	October 11, 1994	June 30, 2014	January 31, 2018
85	David Briones	W.D. Tex.	August 25, 1994	October 7, 1994	voice vote	October 11, 1994	February 26, 2009	Incumbent
86	Elaine E. Bucklo	N.D. Ill.	August 16, 1994	October 7, 1994	voice vote	October 11, 1994	October 31, 2009	Incumbent
87	Robert J. Cindrich	W.D. Pa.	August 12, 1994	October 7, 1994	voice vote	October 7, 1994	January 30, 2004	–
88	David H. Coar	N.D. Ill.	August 16, 1994	October 7, 1994	voice vote	October 7, 1994	August 12, 2009	December 31, 2010
89	Robert Gettleman	N.D. Ill.	August 16, 1994	October 7, 1994	voice vote	October 11, 1994	May 5, 2009	Incumbent
90	Helen W. Gillmor	D. Haw.	August 25, 1994	October 7, 1994	voice vote	October 11, 1994	June 30, 2009	Incumbent
91	David Hamilton	S.D. Ind.	June 8, 1994	October 7, 1994	voice vote	October 11, 1994	November 24, 2009	Elevated
92	Sven Erik Holmes	N.D. Okla.	September 22, 1994	October 7, 1994	voice vote	November 21, 1994	March 13, 2005	–
93	Okla Jones II	E.D. La.	August 25, 1994	October 7, 1994	voice vote	October 11, 1994	January 8, 1996	–
94	David A. Katz	N.D. Ohio	August 12, 1994	October 7, 1994	voice vote	October 11, 1994	January 1, 2005	July 26, 2016
95	Sean J. McLaughlin	W.D. Pa.	August 12, 1994	October 7, 1994	voice vote	October 11, 1994	August 16, 2013	–
96	Vicki Miles-LaGrange	W.D. Okla.	September 22, 1994	October 7, 1994	voice vote	November 28, 1994	November 5, 2018	Incumbent
97	William Theodore Moore Jr.	S.D. Ga.	July 13, 1994	October 7, 1994	voice vote	October 11, 1994	February 28, 2017	March 31, 2024
98	Kathleen M. O'Malley	N.D. Ohio	September 20, 1994	October 7, 1994	voice vote	October 12, 1994	December 27, 2010	Elevated
99	Catherine D. Perry	E.D. Mo.	July 15, 1994	October 7, 1994	voice vote	October 7, 1994	December 31, 2018	Incumbent
100	Thomas Porteous	E.D. La.	August 25, 1994	October 7, 1994	voice vote	October 11, 1994	December 8, 2010	–
101	Paul E. Riley	S.D. Ill.	August 16, 1994	October 7, 1994	voice vote	October 7, 1994	October 11, 2001	–
102	James Robertson	D.D.C.	September 14, 1994	October 7, 1994	voice vote	October 11, 1994	December 31, 2008	June 1, 2010
103	Thomas B. Russell	W.D. Ky.	September 14, 1994	October 7, 1994	voice vote	October 11, 1994	November 15, 2011	September 1, 2023
104	Roslyn O. Silver	D. Ariz.	September 14, 1994	October 7, 1994	voice vote	October 11, 1994	September 3, 2013	Incumbent
105	Dominic J. Squatrito	D. Conn.	July 28, 1994	October 7, 1994	voice vote	October 7, 1994	November 1, 2004	January 20, 2021
106	Alvin W. Thompson	D. Conn.	September 14, 1994	October 7, 1994	voice vote	October 11, 1994	August 31, 2018	Incumbent
107	William H. Walls	D.N.J.	September 14, 1994	October 7, 1994	voice vote	October 11, 1994	January 31, 2005	July 11, 2019
108	David Folsom	E.D. Tex.	October 5, 1994	March 17, 1995	voice vote	March 17, 1995	March 17, 2012	–
109	Thad Heartfield	E.D. Tex.	October 5, 1994	March 17, 1995	voice vote	March 17, 1995	January 1, 2010	December 27, 2022
110	Sidney H. Stein	S.D.N.Y.	September 14, 1994	March 17, 1995	voice vote	March 17, 1995	September 1, 2010	Incumbent
111	Lacy Thornburg	W.D.N.C.	October 5, 1994	March 17, 1995	voice vote	March 17, 1995	August 31, 2009	–
112	Janet Bond Arterton	D. Conn.	January 23, 1995	March 24, 1995	voice vote	March 24, 1995	July 1, 2014	Incumbent
113	Willis B. Hunt Jr.	N.D. Ga.	January 23, 1995	March 24, 1995	voice vote	March 24, 1995	June 30, 2005	Incumbent
114	Charles B. Kornmann	D.S.D.	January 23, 1995	March 24, 1995	voice vote	March 24, 1995	July 31, 2008	Incumbent
115	Maxine M. Chesney	N.D. Cal.	September 14, 1994	May 8, 1995	voice vote	May 10, 1995	June 30, 2009	Incumbent
116	Curtis Lynn Collier	E.D. Tenn.	February 13, 1995	May 8, 1995	voice vote	May 10, 1995	October 31, 2014	Incumbent
117	Eldon E. Fallon	E.D. La.	February 3, 1995	May 8, 1995	voice vote	May 10, 1995	January 1, 2024	Incumbent
118	Joseph R. Goodwin	S.D.W.Va.	February 28, 1995	May 8, 1995	voice vote	May 10, 1995	Incumbent	–
119	Susan Illston	N.D. Cal.	January 23, 1995	May 25, 1995	voice vote	May 26, 1995	July 1, 2013	Incumbent
120	John Garvan Murtha	D. Vt.	April 4, 1995	May 25, 1995	voice vote	May 26, 1995	June 30, 2009	Incumbent
121	George A. O'Toole Jr.	D. Mass.	April 4, 1995 (Note: Previously nominated by President Bush on September 24, 1992. That nomination expired at the end of the term. Renominated on April 4, 1995, by President Clinton.)	May 25, 1995	voice vote	May 26, 1995	January 1, 2018	Incumbent
122	Nancy Atlas	S.D. Tex.	April 4, 1995	June 30, 1995	voice vote	June 30, 1995	June 20, 2014	July 31, 2022
123	Tena Campbell	D. Utah	June 22, 1995	June 30, 1995	voice vote	June 30, 1995	January 1, 2011	Incumbent
124	Wiley Young Daniel	D. Colo.	March 31, 1995	June 30, 1995	voice vote	June 30, 1995	January 1, 2013	May 10, 2019
125	Peter C. Economus	N.D. Ohio	February 28, 1995	June 30, 1995	voice vote	June 30, 1995	July 3, 2009	Incumbent
126	George H. King	C.D. Cal.	April 27, 1995	June 30, 1995	voice vote	June 30, 1995	January 6, 2017	–
127	Donald C. Nugent	N.D. Ohio	April 27, 1995	June 30, 1995	voice vote	June 30, 1995	January 1, 2017	Incumbent
128	Robert H. Whaley	E.D. Wash.	May 24, 1995	June 30, 1995	voice vote	June 30, 1995	July 12, 2009	Incumbent
129	Catherine C. Blake	D. Md.	May 4, 1995	August 11, 1995	voice vote	August 14, 1995	April 2, 2021	March 4, 2026
130	Andre M. Davis	D. Md.	May 4, 1995	August 11, 1995	voice vote	August 14, 1995	November 12, 2009	Elevated
131	Joseph H. McKinley Jr.	W.D. Ky.	May 24, 1995	August 11, 1995	voice vote	August 14, 1995	June 9, 2019	Incumbent
132	James Maxwell Moody	E.D. Ark.	June 27, 1995	August 11, 1995	voice vote	August 14, 1995	October 1, 2008	March 7, 2014
133	William K. Sessions III	D. Vt.	June 30, 1995	August 11, 1995	voice vote	August 14, 1995	June 15, 2014	Incumbent
134	Ortrie D. Smith	W.D. Mo.	June 30, 1995	August 11, 1995	voice vote	August 14, 1995	April 30, 2011	Incumbent
135	B. Lynn Winmill	D. Idaho	May 24, 1995	August 11, 1995	voice vote	August 14, 1995	August 16, 2021	Incumbent
136	Bruce D. Black	D.N.M.	August 10, 1995	December 22, 1995	voice vote	December 26, 1995	October 1, 2012	January 1, 2017
137	Todd J. Campbell	M.D. Tenn.	June 27, 1995	December 22, 1995	voice vote	December 26, 1995	December 1, 2016	April 11, 2021
138	Susan J. Dlott	S.D. Ohio	August 10, 1995	December 22, 1995	voice vote	December 26, 1995	May 31, 2018	Incumbent
139	Bernice B. Donald	W.D. Tenn.	December 7, 1995	December 22, 1995	voice vote	December 26, 1995	September 8, 2011	Elevated
140	Patrick Michael Duffy	D.S.C.	October 11, 1995	December 22, 1995	voice vote	December 26, 1995	December 27, 2009	April 1, 2019
141	Patricia Anne Gaughan	N.D. Ohio	September 29, 1995	December 22, 1995	voice vote	December 26, 1995	October 1, 2023	Incumbent
142	Barbara S. Jones	S.D.N.Y.	October 18, 1995	December 22, 1995	voice vote	December 26, 1995	December 31, 2012	January 4, 2013
143	Hugh Lawson	M.D. Ga.	August 10, 1995	December 22, 1995	voice vote	December 26, 1995	December 31, 2008	March 29, 2024
144	Joan A. Lenard	S.D. Fla.	September 29, 1995	December 22, 1995	voice vote	December 26, 1995	July 1, 2017	Incumbent
145	Barry Ted Moskowitz	S.D. Cal.	June 30, 1995	December 22, 1995	voice vote	December 26, 1995	January 24, 2019	Incumbent
146	Stephen Orlofsky	D.N.J.	June 30, 1995	December 22, 1995	voice vote	December 26, 1995	August 31, 2003	–
147	Charles Lynwood Smith Jr.	N.D. Ala.	December 8, 1995	December 22, 1995	voice vote	December 26, 1995	August 31, 2013	Incumbent
148	John R. Tunheim	D. Minn.	July 10, 1995	December 22, 1995	voice vote	December 26, 1995	December 1, 2023	Incumbent
149	Kim McLane Wardlaw	C.D. Cal.	August 10, 1995	December 22, 1995	voice vote	December 26, 1995	August 3, 1998	Elevated
150	E. Richard Webber	E.D. Mo.	August 10, 1995	December 22, 1995	voice vote	December 26, 1995	June 30, 2009	Incumbent
151	Jed S. Rakoff	S.D.N.Y.	October 11, 1995	December 29, 1995	voice vote	January 4, 1996	December 31, 2010	Incumbent
152	J. Thomas Marten	D. Kan.	October 18, 1995	January 2, 1996	voice vote	January 4, 1996	May 1, 2017	May 1, 2021
153	Gary A. Fenner	W.D. Mo.	December 13, 1995	July 10, 1996	voice vote	July 25, 1996	September 8, 2015	Incumbent
154	Mary Ann Vial Lemmon	E.D. La.	December 19, 1995	July 10, 1996	voice vote	July 25, 1996	January 1, 2011	Incumbent
155	Walker David Miller	D. Colo.	April 18, 1996	July 11, 1996	voice vote	July 25, 1996	April 1, 2008	March 24, 2013
156	W. Craig Broadwater	N.D.W.Va.	January 26, 1996	July 12, 1996	voice vote	July 26, 1996	December 18, 2006	–
157	Joseph A. Greenaway Jr.	D.N.J.	November 27, 1995	July 16, 1996	voice vote	July 26, 1996	February 24, 2010	Elevated
158	Lawrence E. Kahn	N.D.N.Y.	April 18, 1996	July 16, 1996	voice vote	August 1, 1996	August 1, 2007	Incumbent
159	Charles N. Clevert Jr.	E.D. Wis.	December 7, 1995	July 17, 1996	voice vote	July 29, 1996	October 31, 2012	March 31, 2017
160	James Parker Jones	W.D. Va.	December 12, 1995 (Note: Previously nominated by President Carter on May 16, 1979, to a different seat on the same court. That nomination expired at the end of the term. Renominated on December 12, 1995, to a different seat on the same court by President Clinton.)	July 18, 1996	voice vote	August 1, 1996	August 30, 2021	Incumbent
161	Donald W. Molloy	D. Mont.	December 21, 1995	July 18, 1996	voice vote	August 1, 1996	August 16, 2011	Incumbent
162	Edmund A. Sargus Jr.	S.D. Ohio	December 22, 1995	July 22, 1996	voice vote	August 1, 1996	Incumbent	–
163	Nanette Kay Laughrey	E.D. Mo. W.D. Mo.	October 20, 1995	July 24, 1996	voice vote	August 1, 1996	August 27, 2011	Incumbent
164	Dean Pregerson	C.D. Cal.	January 26, 1996	July 24, 1996	voice vote	August 1, 1996	January 28, 2016	June 1, 2025
165	Joan B. Gottschall	N.D. Ill.	March 29, 1996	July 25, 1996	voice vote	August 1, 1996	April 23, 2012	Incumbent
166	Robert Hinkle	N.D. Fla.	June 6, 1996	July 25, 1996	voice vote	August 1, 1996	November 7, 2016	Incumbent
167	Nina Gershon	E.D.N.Y.	October 18, 1995	July 30, 1996	voice vote	August 1, 1996	October 16, 2008	Incumbent
168	Frank R. Zapata	D. Ariz.	July 25, 1996	July 31, 1996	voice vote	August 1, 1996	August 3, 2010	Incumbent
169	Ann D. Montgomery	D. Minn.	November 27, 1995	August 2, 1996	voice vote	August 6, 1996	May 31, 2016	Incumbent
170	Colleen Kollar-Kotelly	D.D.C.	March 29, 1996	March 20, 1997	voice vote	March 26, 1997	February 21, 2023	Incumbent
171	Donald M. Middlebrooks	S.D. Fla.	September 5, 1996	May 23, 1997	voice vote	May 27, 1997	Incumbent	–
172	Jeffrey T. Miller	S.D. Cal.	July 19, 1996	May 23, 1997	voice vote	May 27, 1997	June 6, 2010	Incumbent
173	Robert W. Pratt	S.D. Iowa	August 2, 1996	May 23, 1997	voice vote	May 27, 1997	July 1, 2012	January 28, 2026
174	Alan Stephen Gold	S.D. Fla.	February 12, 1997	June 27, 1997	voice vote	July 1, 1997	January 10, 2011	Incumbent
175	Thomas W. Thrash Jr.	N.D. Ga.	May 16, 1996	July 31, 1997	voice vote	August 1, 1997	May 8, 2021	Incumbent
176	Henry H. Kennedy Jr.	D.D.C.	May 15, 1997	September 4, 1997	96–0	September 18, 1997	November 8, 2011	Incumbent
177	Robert Charles Chambers	S.D.W.Va.	June 5, 1997	September 5, 1997	voice vote	September 18, 1997	Incumbent	–
178	Joseph Bataillon	D. Neb.	March 6, 1996	September 11, 1997	100–0	September 18, 1997	October 3, 2014	Incumbent
179	Christopher F. Droney	D. Conn.	June 5, 1997	September 11, 1997	100–0	September 18, 1997	December 1, 2011	Elevated
180	Janet C. Hall	D. Conn.	June 5, 1997	September 11, 1997	98–1	September 18, 1997	January 21, 2021	Incumbent
181	Katharine Sweeney Hayden	D.N.J.	June 25, 1997	September 25, 1997	97–0	September 29, 1997	May 30, 2010	Incumbent
182	Richard A. Lazzara	M.D. Fla.	May 9, 1996	September 26, 1997	voice vote	September 29, 1997	December 17, 2011	Incumbent
183	Anthony W. Ishii	E.D. Cal.	February 12, 1997	October 9, 1997	voice vote	October 14, 1997	October 31, 2012	Incumbent
184	Richard C. Casey	S.D.N.Y.	July 16, 1997 (Note: Previously nominated by President Bush on July 2, 1992. That nomination expired at the end of the term. Renominated by President Clinton on July 16, 1997.)	October 21, 1997	voice vote	October 24, 1997	March 22, 2007	–
185	Dale A. Kimball	D. Utah	September 4, 1997	October 21, 1997	voice vote	October 24, 1997	November 30, 2009	Incumbent
186	Algenon L. Marbley	S.D. Ohio	July 31, 1997	October 27, 1997	91–0	November 7, 1997	Incumbent	–
187	Charles J. Siragusa	W.D.N.Y.	July 15, 1997	October 30, 1997	98–0	November 5, 1997	December 15, 2012	Incumbent
188	James S. Gwin	N.D. Ohio	July 31, 1997	November 5, 1997	100–0	November 7, 1997	January 31, 2021	Incumbent
189	Jerome B. Friedman	E.D. Va.	June 26, 1997	November 7, 1997	voice vote	November 12, 1997	November 30, 2010	August 19, 2011
190	Norman K. Moon	W.D. Va.	October 8, 1997	November 7, 1997	voice vote	November 12, 1997	July 1, 2010	Incumbent
191	Christina A. Snyder	C.D. Cal.	May 15, 1996	November 7, 1997	93–6	November 10, 1997	November 23, 2016	Incumbent
192	Charles Breyer	N.D. Cal.	July 24, 1997	November 8, 1997	voice vote	November 12, 1997	December 31, 2011	Incumbent
193	Bruce William Kauffman	E.D. Pa.	July 31, 1997	November 8, 1997	voice vote	November 12, 1997	February 11, 2008	July 20, 2009
194	Rodney W. Sippel	E.D. Mo. W.D. Mo.	May 15, 1997	November 8, 1997	voice vote	November 12, 1997	January 28, 2023	Incumbent
195	A. Richard Caputo	M.D. Pa.	July 31, 1997	November 9, 1997	voice vote	November 12, 1997	March 31, 2009	March 11, 2020
196	Frank C. Damrell Jr.	E.D. Cal.	July 24, 1997	November 9, 1997	voice vote	November 12, 1997	December 31, 2008	December 1, 2011
197	Martin Jenkins	N.D. Cal.	July 24, 1997	November 9, 1997	voice vote	November 12, 1997	April 3, 2008	–
198	Lynn Adelman	E.D. Wis.	September 8, 1997	November 13, 1997	voice vote	December 23, 1997	Incumbent	–
199	Richard W. Story	N.D. Ga.	September 15, 1997	January 28, 1998	voice vote	February 4, 1998	December 1, 2018	Incumbent
200	Ann Aiken	D. Ore.	November 27, 1995	January 28, 1998	67–30	February 4, 1998	December 29, 2023	Incumbent
201	Carlos R. Moreno	C.D. Cal.	July 3, 1997	February 3, 1998	96–0	February 4, 1998	October 18, 2001	–
202	Margaret M. Morrow	C.D. Cal.	May 9, 1996	February 11, 1998	67–28	February 24, 1998	October 29, 2015	January 6, 2016
203	Richard L. Young	S.D. Ind.	July 15, 1997	March 2, 1998	81–0	March 6, 1998	March 31, 2023	Incumbent
204	Sam A. Lindsay	N.D. Tex.	November 8, 1997	March 11, 1998	voice vote	March 17, 1998	Incumbent	–
205	Hilda G. Tagle	S.D. Tex.	August 10, 1995 (Note: Renominated on March 21, 1997, after initial nomination expired.)	March 11, 1998	voice vote	March 17, 1998	December 31, 2012	Incumbent
206	Jeremy Fogel	N.D. Cal.	September 8, 1997	March 16, 1998	90–0	March 17, 1998	December 31, 2014	September 14, 2018
207	Edward F. Shea	E.D. Wash.	September 4, 1997	March 27, 1998	voice vote	April 8, 1998	June 7, 2012	Incumbent
208	Robert T. Dawson	W.D. Ark.	November 7, 1997	April 2, 1998	voice vote	April 7, 1998	August 14, 2009	Incumbent
209	Michael P. McCuskey	C.D. Ill.	July 31, 1997	April 2, 1998	voice vote	April 3, 1998	June 30, 2013	May 31, 2014
210	Johnnie B. Rawlinson	D. Nev.	January 27, 1998	April 2, 1998	voice vote	April 7, 1998	July 26, 2000	Elevated
211	G. Patrick Murphy	S.D. Ill.	July 31, 1997	April 2, 1998	98–1	April 3, 1998	December 1, 2013	–
212	Ivan L. R. Lemelle	E.D. La.	February 12, 1997	April 3, 1998	voice vote	April 7, 1998	June 29, 2015	Incumbent
213	Garr King	D. Ore.	October 8, 1997	April 27, 1998	voice vote	April 30, 1998	January 30, 2009	February 5, 2019
214	Gregory M. Sleet	D. Del.	January 27, 1998	April 27, 1998	voice vote	April 30, 1998	May 1, 2017	September 28, 2018
215	George Caram Steeh III	E.D. Mich.	September 24, 1997	May 13, 1998	voice vote	May 22, 1998	January 29, 2013	Incumbent
216	Arthur Tarnow	E.D. Mich.	September 24, 1997	May 13, 1998	voice vote	May 22, 1998	May 25, 2010	January 21, 2022
217	William Dimitrouleas	S.D. Fla.	January 27, 1998 (Note: Previously nominated by President Bush on October 2, 1992, to a different seat on the same court. That nomination expired at the end of the term. Renominated on January 27, 1998, to a different seat on the same court by President Clinton.)	May 14, 1998	voice vote	May 22, 1998	Incumbent	–
218	Stephan P. Mickle	N.D. Fla.	January 27, 1998	May 14, 1998	voice vote	May 22, 1998	June 22, 2011	January 26, 2021
219	Richard W. Roberts	D.D.C.	January 27, 1998	June 5, 1998	voice vote	June 23, 1998	March 16, 2016	Incumbent
220	Susan Oki Mollway	D. Haw.	December 21, 1995	June 22, 1998	56–34	June 23, 1998	November 6, 2015	Incumbent
221	Howard Matz	C.D. Cal.	October 20, 1997	June 26, 1998	85–0	June 29, 1998	July 11, 2011	April 1, 2013
222	Victoria A. Roberts	E.D. Mich.	July 31, 1997	June 26, 1998	85–0	June 29, 1998	February 25, 2021	September 1, 2023
223	Raner Collins	D. Ariz.	May 11, 1998	July 31, 1998	voice vote	August 3, 1998	March 4, 2019	Incumbent
224	Robert G. James	W.D. La.	January 27, 1998	July 31, 1998	voice vote	August 3, 1998	May 31, 2016	Incumbent
225	Dan Polster	N.D. Ohio	July 31, 1997	July 31, 1998	voice vote	August 3, 1998	January 31, 2021	Incumbent
226	Ralph E. Tyson	M.D. La.	April 2, 1998	July 31, 1998	voice vote	August 3, 1998	July 18, 2011	–
227	Carl Barbier	E.D. La.	May 19, 1998	September 28, 1998	voice vote	October 1, 1998	January 1, 2023	Incumbent
228	Gerald Bruce Lee	E.D. Va.	May 22, 1998	September 28, 1998	voice vote	October 1, 1998	September 30, 2017	–
229	Patricia A. Seitz	S.D. Fla.	May 22, 1998	September 28, 1998	voice vote	October 1, 1998	November 16, 2012	Incumbent
230	H. Dean Buttram Jr.	N.D. Ala.	August 31, 1998	October 8, 1998	voice vote	October 9, 1998	June 30, 2002	–
231	Inge Prytz Johnson	N.D. Ala.	August 31, 1998	October 8, 1998	voice vote	October 9, 1998	October 24, 2012	Incumbent
232	Richard M. Berman	S.D.N.Y.	May 21, 1998	October 21, 1998	voice vote	October 22, 1998	September 11, 2011	Incumbent
233	David O. Carter	C.D. Cal.	June 25, 1998	October 21, 1998	voice vote	October 22, 1998	Incumbent	–
234	Donovan W. Frank	D. Minn.	May 21, 1998	October 21, 1998	voice vote	October 22, 1998	October 31, 2016	Incumbent
235	Alvin Hellerstein	S.D.N.Y.	May 15, 1998	October 21, 1998	voice vote	October 22, 1998	January 31, 2011	October 28, 2026
236	David R. Herndon	S.D. Ill.	April 23, 1998	October 21, 1998	voice vote	October 22, 1998	January 7, 2019	–
237	Yvette Kane	M.D. Pa.	June 4, 1998	October 21, 1998	voice vote	October 22, 1998	October 11, 2018	Incumbent
238	Robert S. Lasnik	W.D. Wash.	May 11, 1998	October 21, 1998	voice vote	October 22, 1998	January 27, 2016	Incumbent
239	Nora Margaret Manella	C.D. Cal.	March 31, 1998	October 21, 1998	voice vote	October 22, 1998	May 21, 2006	–
240	Colleen McMahon	S.D.N.Y.	May 21, 1998	October 21, 1998	voice vote	October 22, 1998	April 10, 2021	Incumbent
241	Norman A. Mordue	N.D.N.Y.	October 5, 1998	October 21, 1998	voice vote	October 22, 1998	June 30, 2013	December 29, 2022
242	James Martin Munley	M.D. Pa.	June 4, 1998	October 21, 1998	voice vote	October 22, 1998	January 30, 2009	March 22, 2020
243	Rebecca R. Pallmeyer	N.D. Ill.	July 31, 1997	October 21, 1998	voice vote	October 22, 1998	August 1, 2024	Incumbent
244	William H. Pauley III	S.D.N.Y.	May 21, 1998	October 21, 1998	voice vote	October 22, 1998	March 1, 2018	July 6, 2021
245	Jeanne E. Scott	C.D. Ill.	April 2, 1998	October 21, 1998	voice vote	October 22, 1998	August 1, 2010	–
246	Margaret B. Seymour	D.S.C.	September 9, 1998	October 21, 1998	voice vote	October 22, 1998	January 16, 2013	August 31, 2022
247	Aleta Arthur Trauger	M.D. Tenn.	September 22, 1998	October 21, 1998	voice vote	October 22, 1998	Incumbent	–
248	Thomas J. Whelan	S.D. Cal.	June 4, 1998	October 21, 1998	voice vote	October 22, 1998	August 15, 2010	Incumbent
249	William J. Hibbler	N.D. Ill.	September 18, 1998	April 15, 1999	voice vote	April 22, 1999	March 19, 2012	–
250	Matthew Kennelly	N.D. Ill.	September 18, 1998	April 15, 1999	voice vote	April 22, 1999	October 7, 2021	Incumbent
251	Keith P. Ellison	S.D. Tex.	January 26, 1999	June 30, 1999	94–4	July 7, 1999	Incumbent	–
252	Gary Allen Feess	C.D. Cal.	January 26, 1999	June 30, 1999	94–4	July 7, 1999	March 13, 2014	January 5, 2015
253	W. Allen Pepper Jr.	N.D. Miss.	March 8, 1999	June 30, 1999	94–4	July 7, 1999	January 24, 2012	–
254	Karen Schreier	D.S.D.	March 8, 1999	June 30, 1999	94–4	July 7, 1999	May 15, 2024	Incumbent
255	Stefan R. Underhill	D. Conn.	January 26, 1999	June 30, 1999	94–4	July 7, 1999	November 1, 2022	Incumbent
256	T. John Ward	E.D. Tex.	January 26, 1999	July 13, 1999	voice vote	July 15, 1999	October 1, 2011	–
257	William Alsup	N.D. Cal.	March 24, 1999	July 30, 1999	voice vote	August 17, 1999	January 21, 2021	Incumbent
258	Carlos Murguia	D. Kan.	March 24, 1999	September 8, 1999	voice vote	September 22, 1999	April 1, 2020	–
259	Adalberto Jordan	S.D. Fla.	March 15, 1999	September 8, 1999	93–1	September 9, 1999	February 24, 2012	Elevated
260	Marsha J. Pechman	W.D. Wash.	March 24, 1999	September 8, 1999	93–1	September 9, 1999	February 6, 2016	Incumbent
261	Naomi Reice Buchwald	S.D.N.Y.	February 12, 1999	September 13, 1999	voice vote	September 22, 1999	March 21, 2012	Incumbent
262	David N. Hurd	N.D.N.Y.	February 12, 1999	September 13, 1999	voice vote	September 22, 1999	December 9, 2024	Incumbent
263	M. James Lorenz	S.D. Cal.	March 8, 1999	October 1, 1999	voice vote	October 5, 1999	October 25, 2009	Incumbent
264	Victor Marrero	S.D.N.Y.	May 27, 1999	October 1, 1999	voice vote	October 5, 1999	December 31, 2010	Incumbent
265	Ted Stewart	D. Utah	July 27, 1999	October 5, 1999	93–5	November 11, 1999	September 1, 2014	Incumbent
266	Anna J. Brown	D. Ore.	April 22, 1999	October 15, 1999	voice vote	October 26, 1999	July 27, 2017	Incumbent
267	Ellen Segal Huvelle	D.D.C.	March 25, 1999	October 15, 1999	voice vote	October 26, 1999	June 2, 2014	Incumbent
268	Charles A. Pannell Jr.	N.D. Ga.	July 14, 1999	October 15, 1999	voice vote	October 26, 1999	January 31, 2013	Incumbent
269	Florence-Marie Cooper	C.D. Cal.	July 14, 1999	November 10, 1999	voice vote	November 15, 1999	January 15, 2010	–
270	Ronald A. Guzman	N.D. Ill.	August 5, 1999	November 10, 1999	voice vote	November 15, 1999	November 16, 2014	Incumbent
271	William Joseph Haynes Jr.	M.D. Tenn.	May 27, 1999	November 10, 1999	voice vote	November 15, 1999	December 1, 2014	January 16, 2017
272	Faith S. Hochberg	D.N.J.	April 22, 1999 (Note: Previously nominated on November 27, 1995, to another seat on the same court. That nomination expired. Nominated to another seat on the same court on April 22, 1999.)	November 10, 1999	voice vote	November 15, 1999	March 6, 2015	–
273	Virginia A. Phillips	C.D. Cal.	May 11, 1998	November 10, 1999	voice vote	November 15, 1999	February 14, 2022	Incumbent
274	Barbara M. Lynn	N.D. Tex.	March 25, 1999	November 17, 1999	voice vote	November 22, 1999	May 15, 2023	August 1, 2025
275	Joel A. Pisano	D.N.J.	September 22, 1999	February 10, 2000	95–2	February 16, 2000	February 16, 2015	–
276	George B. Daniels	S.D.N.Y.	August 5, 1999	February 24, 2000	98–0	March 9, 2000	May 1, 2021	Incumbent
277	John Antoon	M.D. Fla.	February 9, 2000	May 24, 2000	voice vote	May 31, 2000	June 3, 2013	Incumbent
278	Marianne Battani	E.D. Mich.	August 5, 1999	May 24, 2000	voice vote	June 2, 2000	June 10, 2012	September 9, 2021
279	Kent Dawson	D. Nev.	April 6, 2000	May 24, 2000	voice vote	May 31, 2000	July 9, 2012	Incumbent
280	Nicholas Garaufis	E.D.N.Y.	February 28, 2000	May 24, 2000	voice vote	May 25, 2000	October 1, 2014	Incumbent
281	Phyllis J. Hamilton	N.D. Cal.	February 9, 2000	May 24, 2000	voice vote	May 25, 2000	February 1, 2021	Incumbent
282	Roger L. Hunt	D. Nev.	March 27, 2000	May 24, 2000	voice vote	May 25, 2000	May 26, 2011	Incumbent
283	David M. Lawson	E.D. Mich.	August 5, 1999	May 24, 2000	voice vote	June 2, 2000	August 6, 2021	Incumbent
284	Berle M. Schiller	E.D. Pa.	April 11, 2000	May 24, 2000	voice vote	June 2, 2000	June 18, 2012	July 22, 2025
285	Richard Barclay Surrick	E.D. Pa.	April 11, 2000	May 24, 2000	voice vote	June 5, 2000	February 1, 2011	Incumbent
286	Petrese B. Tucker	E.D. Pa.	July 27, 1999	May 24, 2000	voice vote	June 1, 2000	June 1, 2021	Incumbent
287	James D. Whittemore	M.D. Fla.	October 20, 1999	May 24, 2000	voice vote	May 25, 2000	August 29, 2017	Incumbent
288	Gerard E. Lynch	S.D.N.Y.	February 28, 2000	May 24, 2000	63–36	May 25, 2000	September 21, 2009	Elevated
289	James Joseph Brady	M.D. La.	July 14, 1999	May 24, 2000	83–16	May 25, 2000	December 31, 2013	December 9, 2017
290	Mary A. McLaughlin	E.D. Pa.	March 9, 2000	May 24, 2000	86–14	May 31, 2000	November 18, 2013	July 1, 2020
291	Jay A. García-Gregory	D.P.R.	April 5, 2000	June 16, 2000	voice vote	July 11, 2000	September 30, 2018	Incumbent
292	Beverly B. Martin	N.D. Ga.	March 27, 2000	June 16, 2000	voice vote	August 3, 2000	February 1, 2010	Elevated
293	Laura Taylor Swain	S.D.N.Y.	April 25, 2000	June 16, 2000	voice vote	July 11, 2000	Incumbent	–
294	John W. Darrah	N.D. Ill.	May 11, 2000	June 30, 2000	voice vote	July 14, 2000	March 1, 2017	March 23, 2017
295	Paul Huck	S.D. Fla.	May 9, 2000	June 30, 2000	voice vote	July 11, 2000	August 31, 2010	Incumbent
296	Joan Lefkow	N.D. Ill.	May 11, 2000	June 30, 2000	voice vote	July 11, 2000	September 1, 2012	Incumbent
297	George Z. Singal	D. Me.	May 11, 2000	June 30, 2000	voice vote	July 11, 2000	July 31, 2013	Incumbent
298	Dennis M. Cavanaugh	D.N.J.	May 3, 2000	July 21, 2000	voice vote	September 20, 2000	January 31, 2014	–
299	James S. Moody Jr.	M.D. Fla.	June 8, 2000	July 21, 2000	voice vote	July 28, 2000	March 31, 2014	Incumbent
300	Gregory A. Presnell	M.D. Fla.	June 8, 2000	July 21, 2000	voice vote	July 31, 2000	April 1, 2012	Incumbent
301	John E. Steele	M.D. Fla.	June 6, 2000	July 21, 2000	voice vote	July 26, 2000	June 3, 2015	July 14, 2026
302	Susan R. Bolton	D. Ariz.	July 21, 2000	October 3, 2000	voice vote	October 13, 2000	September 1, 2016	Incumbent
303	Mary H. Murguia	D. Ariz.	July 21, 2000	October 3, 2000	voice vote	October 13, 2000	January 4, 2011	Elevated
304	Michael Joseph Reagan	S.D. Ill.	May 11, 2000	October 3, 2000	voice vote	October 13, 2000	March 31, 2019	–
305	James A. Teilborg	D. Ariz.	July 21, 2000	October 3, 2000	95–0	October 13, 2000	January 30, 2013	Incumbent

== United States Court of International Trade ==
#	Judge	Nomination date	Confirmation date	Confirmation vote	Began active service	Ended active service	Ended senior status
1	Donald C. Pogue	June 30, 1995	August 11, 1995	voice vote	August 14, 1995	July 1, 2014	October 26, 2016
2	Evan Wallach	June 27, 1995	August 11, 1995	voice vote	August 14, 1995	November 18, 2011	Elevated
3	Judith Barzilay	January 27, 1998	March 11, 1998	voice vote	March 11, 1998	June 2, 2011	Incumbent
4	Delissa A. Ridgway	January 27, 1998	March 11, 1998	voice vote	March 17, 1998	January 31, 2019	Incumbent
5	Richard K. Eaton	August 3, 1999	October 22, 1999	voice vote	October 26, 1999	August 22, 2014	Incumbent

== Specialty courts (Article I) ==
=== United States Court of Appeals for the Armed Forces ===
#	Judge	Nomination date	Confirmation date	Confirmation vote	Began active service	Ended active service	Ended senior status
1	Andrew S. Effron	June 21, 1996	July 12, 1996	voice vote	August 1, 1996	September 30, 2011	Incumbent
2	James E. Baker	May 2, 2000	September 8, 2000	voice vote	September 19, 2000	July 31, 2015	Incumbent

=== United States Court of Federal Claims ===
#	Judge	Nomination date	Confirmation date	Confirmation vote	Began active service	Ended active service	Ended senior status
1	Christine Odell Cook Miller	November 6, 1997	February 3, 1998	96–0	November 6, 1997 (Note: Recess appointment; subsequently confirmed. Was previously appointed by Ronald Reagan and served since December 10, 1982.)	February 4, 2013	March 1, 2013
2	Lawrence Baskir	March 29, 1996	October 21, 1998	voice vote	October 22, 1998	April 2, 2013	Incumbent
3	Emily C. Hewitt	September 28, 1998	October 21, 1998	voice vote	November 10, 1998	October 22, 2013	–
4	Lynn J. Bush	June 22, 1998	October 21, 1998	voice vote	October 22, 1998	October 22, 2013	Incumbent
5	Edward J. Damich	September 28, 1998	October 21, 1998	voice vote	October 22, 1998	October 22, 2013	Incumbent
6	Nancy B. Firestone	September 28, 1998	October 21, 1998	voice vote	October 22, 1998	October 22, 2013	October 3, 2022
7	Francis Allegra	July 30, 1998	October 21, 1998	voice vote	October 22, 1998	October 22, 2013	August 27, 2015
8	Sarah L. Wilson	January 3, 2001	N/A	N/A	January 19, 2001 (Note: Recess appointment; appointment expired November 22, 2002.)	November 22, 2002	–

=== United States Court of Veterans Appeals ===
#	Judge	Nomination date	Confirmation date	Confirmation vote	Began active service	Ended active service	Ended senior status
1	William P. Greene Jr.	May 19, 1997	November 5, 1997	voice vote	November 7, 1997	November 2010	Incumbent

=== United States Tax Court ===
#	Judge	Nomination date	Confirmation date	Confirmation vote	Began active service	Ended active service	Ended senior status
1	Herbert Chabot	September 7, 1993	October 7, 1993	voice vote	October 20, 1993	June 30, 2001	January 1, 2016
2	Maurice B. Foley	September 19, 1994 (Note: Renominated on January 5, 1995, after initial nomination expired.)	March 17, 1995	voice vote	April 10, 1995	March 29, 2025	Incumbent
3	Juan F. Vasquez	September 19, 1994	March 17, 1995	voice vote	May 1, 1995	June 24, 2018	Incumbent
4	Joseph H. Gale	October 10, 1995	December 22, 1995	voice vote	February 6, 1996	August 26, 2023	October 1, 2024
5	Mary Ann Cohen	September 19, 1997	October 30, 1997	voice vote	November 7, 1997	October 1, 2012	Incumbent
6	L. Paige Marvel	October 24, 1997	February 12, 1998	voice vote	April 6, 1998	December 6, 2019	Incumbent
7	Michael B. Thornton	October 8, 1997	February 12, 1998	voice vote	March 8, 1998	January 1, 2021	Incumbent
8	Joel Gerber	September 12, 2000	October 24, 2000	voice vote	December 15, 2000	June 1, 2006	July 16, 2020
9	Stephen Swift	September 12, 2000	October 24, 2000	voice vote	December 1, 2000	September 8, 2008	January 1, 2016

== Territorial courts (Article IV) ==
#	Judge	Court	Nomination date	Confirmation date	Confirmation vote	Began active service	Ended active service	Ended senior status
1	Raymond L. Finch	D.V.I.	March 22, 1994	May 6, 1994	voice vote	September 1, 1994	August 15, 2008	August 22, 2018
2	Alex R. Munson	D. N. Mar. I.	September 28, 1998	October 21, 1998	voice vote	November 18, 1998	February 28, 2010	December 5, 2025

== Notes ==
Courts

Renominations

Recess appointments

== Sources ==
- Federal Judicial Center
