= Michael Joseph Reagan =

American judge

Chief Judge of the United States District Court for the Southern District of Illinois
- In office October 1, 2014 – March 31, 2019
- Preceded by: David R. Herndon
- Succeeded by: Nancy J. Rosenstengel

Judge of the United States District Court for the Southern District of Illinois
- In office October 13, 2000 – March 31, 2019
- Appointed by: Bill Clinton
- Preceded by: Seat established by 71 Stat. 586
- Succeeded by: Stephen P. McGlynn

Personal details
- Born: March 27, 1954 (age 71) Albuquerque, New Mexico, U.S.
- Education: Bradley University (B.S.); St. Louis University School of Law (J.D.)

Michael Joseph Reagan (born March 27, 1954) is a former United States district judge of the United States District Court for the Southern District of Illinois.

== Education and career ==
Born in Albuquerque, New Mexico, Reagan received a Bachelor of Science degree from Bradley University in 1976 and a Juris Doctor from St. Louis University School of Law in 1980. He was a law clerk in the Office of the Appellate Defender for the Fifth Appellate District of Illinois in 1978. He was in private practice from 1979 to 2000, also working as an instructor in business law, Belleville Area College from 1980 to 1983 and as an adjunct assistant professor of law at St. Louis University from 1982 to 1988. He was an assistant public defender for St. Clair County, Illinois from 1996 to 2000.

== Federal judicial service ==
On May 11, 2000, Reagan was nominated by President Bill Clinton to a new seat on the United States District Court for the Southern District of Illinois new seat created on November 2, 2002, by 116 Stat. 1758. (Note: Seat superseded Seat 6 on October 11, 2001 pursuant to 71 Stat. 586. Seat made permanent on November 2, 2002 by 116 Stat. 1758 after the certification of Paul E. Riley as disabled.) Reagan was confirmed by the United States Senate on October 3, 2000, and received his commission on October 13, 2000. He was designated Chief Judge on October 1, 2014. He retired from active service on March 31, 2019.

== Sources ==
Legal offices
Preceded by Seat established by 71 Stat. 586	Judge of the United States District Court for the Southern District of Illinois; 2000–2019	Succeeded by Stephen P. McGlynn
Preceded by David R. Herndon	Chief Judge of the United States District Court for the Southern District of Illinois; 2014–2019	Succeeded by Nancy J. Rosenstengel
