= Staci M. Yandle =

American judge (born 1961)

Staci Yandle
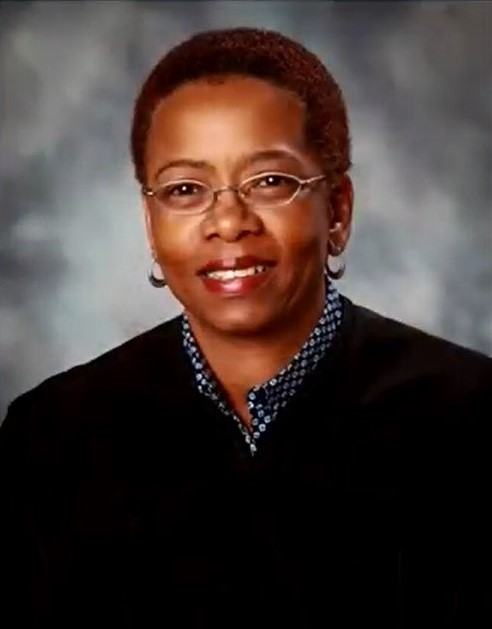

Chief Judge of the United States District Court for the Southern District of Illinois
- Incumbent
- Assumed office January 1, 2026
- Preceded by: Nancy J. Rosenstengel

Judge of the United States District Court for the Southern District of Illinois
- Incumbent
- Assumed office June 19, 2014
- Appointed by: Barack Obama
- Preceded by: John Gilbert

Personal details
- Born: Staci Michelle Yandle; July 27, 1961 (age 65) Centreville, Illinois, U.S.
- Education: University of Illinois, Urbana-Champaign (BS); Vanderbilt University (JD)

Staci Michelle Yandle (born July 27, 1961) is the chief United States district judge of the United States District Court for the Southern District of Illinois.

== Biography ==
Yandle received a Bachelor of Science degree in political science in 1983 from the University of Illinois. She received a Juris Doctor in 1987 from the Vanderbilt University School of Law. From 1987 to 2003, she was an associate with the law firm of Carr, Korein, Schlichter, Kunin, Montroy, Glass & Bogard. in East St. Louis.

From 2003 to 2007, she was a partner with The Rex Carr Law Firm LLC in East St. Louis. At this firm ,she was the first woman and African American partner. Here Yandle focused her practice on personal injury law, nursing home negligence, and medical malpractice.

From 2007 to 2014, she was a sole practitioner in O'Fallon, Illinois. When she was a sole practitioner, she focused on civil litigation in federal and state courts. In addition to her practice of law, she served on the Illinois Advisory Committee to the United States Commission on Civil Rights from 1992 to 1996, and by appointment on the Illinois Gaming Board, from 1999 to 2001.

She has also served on the board of governors of the American Association for Justice and the St. Clair County Bar Association. She is a former president of the Metro East Bar Association.

=== Federal judicial service ===
On January 16, 2014, President Barack Obama nominated Yandle to serve as a United States district judge of the United States District Court for the Southern District of Illinois, to the seat being vacated by Judge John Phil Gilbert, who assumed senior status on March 15, 2014. She received a hearing before the United States Senate Committee on the Judiciary on March 12, 2014. On April 3, 2014 her nomination was reported out of committee by a 17–1 vote. On June 12, 2014, Senate Majority Leader Harry Reid filed for a motion to invoke cloture on the nomination. On Monday, June 16, 2014 the United States Senate invoked cloture on her nomination by a 55–37 vote. On Tuesday, June 17, 2014, her nomination was confirmed by a 52–44 vote. She received her judicial commission on June 19, 2014. Yandle was sworn in on August 21, 2014. She became the chief judge of the court in 2026.

=== Notable cases ===
In United States v. Iyman Faris Yandle denied a motion seeking to take away citizenship from Iyman Faris on July 11, 2018. Faris became a naturalized citizen in 1999. He was prisoned after pleading guilty to his involvement to a 2003 terrorism plot to cut the cables of the Brooklyn Bridge. He was sentenced to 20 years.

== Personal life ==
In the fall of 1984, at the age of 23 year old, Yandle was diagnosed with a brain aneurism that needed emergency attention. Her prognosis warned her that she might lose her sight, ability to talk, and that she needed to leave law school. However, she left the hospital 10 days later to return to Vanderbilt in January. Yandle's medical journey led her to come out as a lesbian.

Yandle’s father died the summer before her final semester of law school.

Yandle is openly lesbian. She is the first openly gay judge in the Seventh Circuit, which covers Illinois, Indiana and Wisconsin. She also is the first African-American district judge ever to sit on the federal bench in the Southern District of Illinois. She was the second woman federal judge in the Southern District, only after Nancy Rosenstengel was confirmed in May 2014.

== See also ==
- List of African-American federal judges
- List of African-American jurists
- List of first women lawyers and judges in Illinois
- List of first women lawyers and judges in the United States
- List of LGBT jurists in the United States

Legal offices
| Preceded by John Gilbert | Judge of the United States District Court for the Southern District of Illinois; 2014–present | Incumbent |
| Preceded by Nancy J. Rosenstengel | Chief Judge of the United States District Court for the Southern District of Illinois; 2026–present | Incumbent |
