= Stephen R. Wigginton =

American attorney

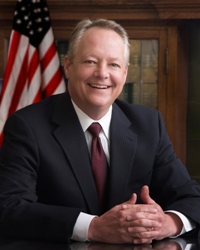

United States Attorney for the Southern District of Illinois
- In office August 27, 2010 – December 11, 2015
- President: Barack Obama
- Preceded by: A. Courtney Cox
- Succeeded by: Steven D. Weinhoeft

Personal details
- Party: Democratic
- Education: Southern Illinois University; Saint Louis University (J.D.)
- Profession: Attorney

Stephen Ray Wigginton is an American attorney who served as the United States Attorney for the Southern District of Illinois from 2010 to 2015.

== Biographical sketch ==
Stephen Ray Wigginton was raised in Southern Illinois and attended Southern Illinois University at Edwardsville and later the Saint Louis University School of Law. He began a career in corporate law before choosing to become a litigator with the St. Louis’ Circuit Attorney’s Office. Two years later, he returned to the private sector as a litigator. He would later go on to form the firm Weilmuenster & Wigginton PC and serve as a part-time Assistant State's Attorney in Madison County, Illinois.

Governor Rod Blagojevich appointed Wigginton to be a member of the Southern Illinois University Board of Trustees for a term commencing August 8, 2005 and ending January 17, 2011 to which he was confirmed by the Illinois Senate. Wiggington resigned from the Southern Illinois University Board of Trustees in 2010. Governor Pat Quinn appointed Donna L. Manering of Makanda, Illinois to succeed Wigginton and she was later confirmed by the Illinois Senate.

In 2009, Senator Dick Durbin sent a short list consisting of Wigginton and the then-sitting U.S. Attorney A. Courtney Cox to President Barack Obama for consideration. President Obama announced his intention to appoint Wigginton the United States Attorney for the Southern District of Illinois in 2010. The United States Senate Committee on the Judiciary voted favorably on Wigginton's nomination on June 24, 2010 and the full United States Senate voted to confirm Wigginton by voice vote on August 5, 2010. Wigginton was sworn in on August 27, 2010. On November 24, 2015, he announced his resignation as U.S. Attorney effective midnight on December 11, 2015.

| Preceded by A. Courtney Cox | United States Attorney for the Southern District of Illinois; August 27, 2010 - December 11, 2015 | Succeeded by Steven D. Weinhoeft |
