= William Donald Stiehl =

American judge

Senior Judge of the United States District Court for the Southern District of Illinois
- In office November 30, 1996 – February 8, 2016

Chief Judge of the United States District Court for the Southern District of Illinois
- In office 1992–1993
- Preceded by: James L. Foreman
- Succeeded by: John Phil Gilbert

Judge of the United States District Court for the Southern District of Illinois
- In office June 16, 1986 – November 30, 1996
- Appointed by: Ronald Reagan
- Preceded by: Seat established by 98 Stat. 333
- Succeeded by: G. Patrick Murphy

Personal details
- Born: William Donald Stiehl; December 3, 1925 Belleville, Illinois, U.S.
- Died: February 8, 2016 (aged 90) Belleville, Illinois, U.S.
- Spouse: Celeste M. Stiehl
- Education: Saint Louis University School of Law (LL.B.)

William Donald Stiehl (December 3, 1925 – February 8, 2016) was a United States district judge of the United States District Court for the Southern District of Illinois.

== Education and career ==
Born in Belleville, Illinois, Stiehl was in the United States Navy Lieutenant during World War II, from 1943 to 1946 and again from 1950 to 1952. He received a Bachelor of Laws from Saint Louis University School of Law in 1949. In 1948, Stiehl was elected to the Belleville Town High School and Junior College Board of Education and served as its President. Stiehl also served of the Illinois Constitution Study Commission. He was in private practice in Belleville from 1952 to 1986. He was an assistant state's attorney of Belleville from 1956 to 1960. He was a special assistant attorney general of State of Illinois from 1970 to 1973.

== Federal judicial service ==
Stiehl was nominated by President Ronald Reagan on May 14, 1986, to the United States District Court for the Southern District of Illinois, to a new seat created by 98 Stat. 333. He was confirmed by the United States Senate on June 13, 1986, and received his commission on June 16, 1986. He served as Chief Judge from 1992 to 1993. He assumed senior status on November 30, 1996. Stiehl died on February 8, 2016, in Belleville, at the age of 90. His wife Celeste M. Stiehl served in the Illinois House of Representatives.

== Sources ==
Legal offices
Preceded by Seat established by 98 Stat. 333	Judge of the United States District Court for the Southern District of Illinois; 1986–1996	Succeeded by G. Patrick Murphy
Preceded by James L. Foreman	Chief Judge of the United States District Court for the Southern District of Illinois; 1992–1993	Succeeded by John Phil Gilbert
