= United States District Court for the Southern District of Illinois =

United States federal district court in Illinois

Coordinates: 38.6238°N 90.1565°W

- (S.D. Ill.)

- Map indicating the changing Districts of Illinois
- Location: Melvin Price Federal Building and U.S. Courthouse (East St. Louis) More locations: Benton; Alton; Cairo
- Appeals to: Seventh Circuit
- Established: February 13, 1855
- Judges: 4
- Chief Judge: Staci M. Yandle

Officers of the court
- U.S. Attorney: Steven D. Weinhoeft
- U.S. Marshal: David C. Davis
- www.ilsd.uscourts.gov

The United States District Court for the Southern District of Illinois (in case citations, S.D. Ill.) is a federal district court covering approximately the southern third of the state of Illinois.

Appeals from the Southern District of Illinois are taken to the United States Court of Appeals for the Seventh Circuit (except for patent claims and claims against the U.S. government under the Tucker Act, which are appealed to the Federal Circuit).

It has three courthouses, at Benton, Cairo, and East St. Louis. At present, four judges are assigned to this district.

== History ==
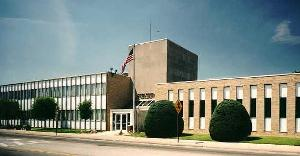
The Benton Federal Building and U.S. Courthouse is located a block from the town square and approximately 300 miles south of Chicago. Constructed in 1959, the two-story building houses U.S. District and Bankruptcy courts. The Benton Courthouse was constructed in 1959 from steel and block with brick veneer and clip-on aluminum panels.

The United States District Court for the District of Illinois was established by a statute passed by the United States Congress on March 3, 1819, 3 Stat. 502. The act established a single office for a judge to preside over the court. Initially, the court was not within any existing judicial circuit, so the district court exercised the jurisdiction of both a district court and a circuit court, with appeals and writs of error taken directly to the United States Supreme Court. In 1837, Congress placed the District of Illinois within the newly created Seventh Circuit, and the district court resumed its normal jurisdiction, 5 Stat. 176.

The Southern District itself was created by a statute passed on February 13, 1855, 10 Stat. 606, which subdivided the District of Illinois into the Northern and the Southern Districts. The boundaries of the District and the seats of the courts were set forth in the statute:

The counties of Hancock, McDonough, Peoria, Woodford, Livingston, and Iroquois, and all the counties in the said State north of them, shall compose one district, to be called the northern district of Illinois, and courts shall be held for the said district at the city of Chicago; and the residue of the counties of the said State shall compose another district, to be called the southern district of Illinois, and courts shall be held for the same at the city of Springfield.

The district has since been re-organized several times. The United States District Court for the Eastern District of Illinois was created on March 3, 1905, by 33 Stat. 992, by splitting counties out of the Northern and Southern Districts. It was later eliminated in a reorganization on October 2, 1978, which replaced it with a Central District, 92 Stat. 883, formed primarily from parts of the Southern District, and returning some counties to the Northern District.

== Jurisdiction ==
The jurisdiction of the Southern District of Illinois comprises the following counties: Alexander, Bond, Calhoun, Clark, Clay, Clinton, Crawford, Cumberland, Edwards, Effingham, Fayette, Franklin, Gallatin, Hamilton, Hardin, Jackson, Jasper, Jefferson, Jersey, Johnson, Lawrence, Madison, Marion, Massac, Monroe, Perry, Pope, Pulaski, Randolph, Richland, Saline, St. Clair, Union, Wabash, Washington, Wayne, White, and Williamson. The district was created in 1979. It has jurisdiction over the eastern suburbs of St. Louis and the city of Carbondale.

The United States Attorney's Office for the Southern District of Illinois represents the United States in civil and criminal litigation in the court. The current United States Attorney is Rachelle Crowe, who was sworn in on June 21, 2022.

== Current judges ==
As of January 1, 2026:

#	Title	Judge	Duty station	Born	Term of service			Appointed by
#	Title	Judge	Duty station	Born	Active	Chief	Senior	Appointed by
22	Chief Judge	Staci M. Yandle	Benton	1961	2014–present	2026–present	—	Obama
21	District Judge	Nancy J. Rosenstengel	East St. Louis	1968	2014–present	2019–2025	—	Obama
23	District Judge	Stephen P. McGlynn	East St. Louis	1962	2020–present	—	—	Trump
24	District Judge	David W. Dugan	East St. Louis	1960	2020–present	—	—	Trump
16	Senior Judge	John Phil Gilbert	Benton	1949	1992–2014	1993–2000	2014–present	G.H.W. Bush

== Former judges ==
#	Judge	Born–died	Active service	Chief Judge	Senior status	Appointed by	Reason for termination
1	Samuel Hubbel Treat Jr.	1811–1887	1855–1887	—	—	Pierce	death
2	William J. Allen	1829–1901	1887–1901 (Note: Recess appointment; formally nominated on December 20, 1887, confirmed by the United States Senate on January 19, 1888, and received commission the same day.)	—	—	Cleveland	death
3	J. Otis Humphrey	1850–1918	1901–1918	—	—	McKinley	death
4	Louis FitzHenry	1870–1935	1918–1933	—	—	Wilson	elevation
5	Charles Guy Briggle	1883–1972	1932–1958	1948–1958	1958–1972	Hoover	death
6	James Earl Major	1887–1972	1933–1937 (Note: Recess appointment; formally nominated on January 8, 1934, confirmed by the Senate on January 23, 1934, and received commission on January 26, 1934.)	—	—	F. Roosevelt	elevation
7	J. Leroy Adair	1887–1956	1937–1956	—	—	F. Roosevelt	death
8	Frederick Olen Mercer	1901–1966	1956–1966	1958–1966	—	Eisenhower	death
—	William George Juergens	1904–1988	—	—	1979–1988 (Note: Reassigned from the Eastern District of Illinois.)	Eisenhower/Operation of law	death
9	Omer Poos	1902–1976	1958–1973	1966–1972	1973–1976	Eisenhower	death
10	Robert Dale Morgan	1912–2002	1967–1979	1972–1979	—	L. Johnson	reassignment
11	James L. Foreman	1927–2012	1979–1992	1979–1992	1992–2012	Nixon/Operation of law	death
12	Harlington Wood Jr.	1920–2008	1973–1976	—	—	Nixon	elevation
13	James Waldo Ackerman	1926–1984	1976–1979	—	—	Ford	reassignment
14	William Louis Beatty	1925–2001	1979–1992	—	1992–2001	Carter	death
15	William Donald Stiehl	1925–2016	1986–1996	1992–1993	1996–2016	Reagan	death
17	Paul E. Riley	1942–2001	1994–2001	—	—	Clinton	death
18	G. Patrick Murphy	1948–present	1998–2013	2000–2007	—	Clinton	retirement
19	David R. Herndon	1953–present	1998–2019	2007–2014	—	Clinton	retirement
20	Michael Joseph Reagan	1954–present	2000–2019	2014–2019	—	Clinton	retirement

== Chief judges ==
Chief judges have administrative responsibilities with respect to their district court. Unlike the Supreme Court, where one justice is specifically nominated to be chief, the office of chief judge rotates among the district court judges. To be chief, a judge must have been in active service on the court for at least one year, be under the age of 65, and have not previously served as chief judge.

A vacancy is filled by the judge highest in seniority among the group of qualified judges. The chief judge serves for a term of seven years, or until age 70, whichever occurs first. The age restrictions are waived if no members of the court would otherwise be qualified for the position.

When the office was created in 1948, the chief judge was the longest-serving judge who had not elected to retire, on what has since 1958 been known as senior status, or declined to serve as chief judge. After August 6, 1959, judges could not become or remain chief after turning 70 years old. The current rules have been in operation since October 1, 1982.

== Succession of seats ==
Seat 1
Seat established on February 13, 1855 by 10 Stat. 606
Treat, Jr.	1855–1887
Allen	1887–1901
Humphrey	1901–1918
FitzHenry	1918–1933
Major	1934–1937
Adair	1937–1956
Mercer	1956–1966
Morgan	1967–1979
Seat reassigned to Central District on March 31, 1979 by 93 Stat. 6

Seat 2
Seat established on February 20, 1931 by 46 Stat. 1196
Briggle	1932–1958
Poos	1958–1973
Wood, Jr.	1973–1976
Ackerman	1976–1979
Seat reassigned to Central District on March 31, 1979 by 93 Stat. 6

Seat 3
Seat reassigned from Eastern District on March 31, 1979 by 93 Stat. 6
Foreman	1979–1992
Gilbert	1992–2014
Yandle	2014–present

Seat 4
Seat established on March 31, 1979 by 93 Stat. 6
Beatty	1979–1992
Herndon	1998–2019
Dugan	2020–present

Seat 5
Seat established on July 10, 1984 by 98 Stat. 333
Stiehl	1986–1996
Murphy	1998–2013
Rosenstengel	2014–present

Seat 6
Seat established on December 1, 1990 by 104 Stat. 5089 (temporary)
Riley	1994–2001
Seat abolished on October 11, 2001 (temporary judgeship expired)

Seat 7
Seat established on December 10, 1999 pursuant to 71 Stat. 586 (temporary)
Seat superseded Seat 6 on October 11, 2001 pursuant to 71 Stat. 586
Seat made permanent on November 2, 2002 by 116 Stat. 1758
Reagan	2000–2019
McGlynn	2020–present

== United States Attorneys for the Southern District of Illinois ==
The United States Attorney's Office for the Southern District of Illinois is the federal prosecuting office for cases arising in 38 counties in Southern Illinois. The Office is headquartered in Fairview Heights and also has branch offices in Benton and East St. Louis.

- William E. Trautmann (1905-10)
- Charles A. Karch (1914-1918?)
- James G. Burnside (1918–22)
- W. O. Potter (1922–26)
- Harold G. Baker (1926–31)
- Paul F. Jones (1931–35)
- Arthur Roe (1935–42)
- Henry Grady Vien (1942–43)
- William W. Hart (1943–53)
- Clifford M. Raemer (1953–57)
- Carl W. Feickert (1957–65)
- James R. Burgess Jr.* (April 1979–January 1982)
- Frederick J. Hess* (January 1982–June 1993)
- Clifford J. Proud (June 1993–November 1993)
- W. Charles Grace* (December 20, 1993–January 30, 2002)
- Robert J. Cleary (January 30, 2002–May 29, 2002)
- Laura J. Jones (May 30, 2002–August 6, 2002)
- Miriam F. Miquelon* (August 7, 2002–September 1, 2003)
- Richard E. Byrne (September 2, 2003–November 15, 2003)
- Ronald J. Tenpas* (November 16, 2003–November 20, 2005)
- Edward E. McNally (November 21, 2005–March 11, 2006)
- Randy G. Massey (March 12, 2006–November. 4, 2007)
- Courtney Cox (November 5, 2007–August 26, 2010)
- Stephen R. Wigginton* (August 27, 2010–December 11, 2015)
- James L. Porter (December 12, 2015–July 7, 2016)
- Donald S. Boyce (July 8, 2016–July 22, 2018)
- Steven D. Weinhoeft (July 23, 2018–June 21, 2022)
- Rachelle Aud Crowe* (June 21, 2022–February 18, 2025)
- Ali M. Summers (acting) (February 18–28 2025)
- Steven D. Weinhoeft* (February 28, 2025–Present)

(*) Presidential appointment

== See also ==
- Courts of Illinois
- List of current United States district judges
- List of United States federal courthouses in Illinois
