= Stephen P. McGlynn =

American judge (born 1962)

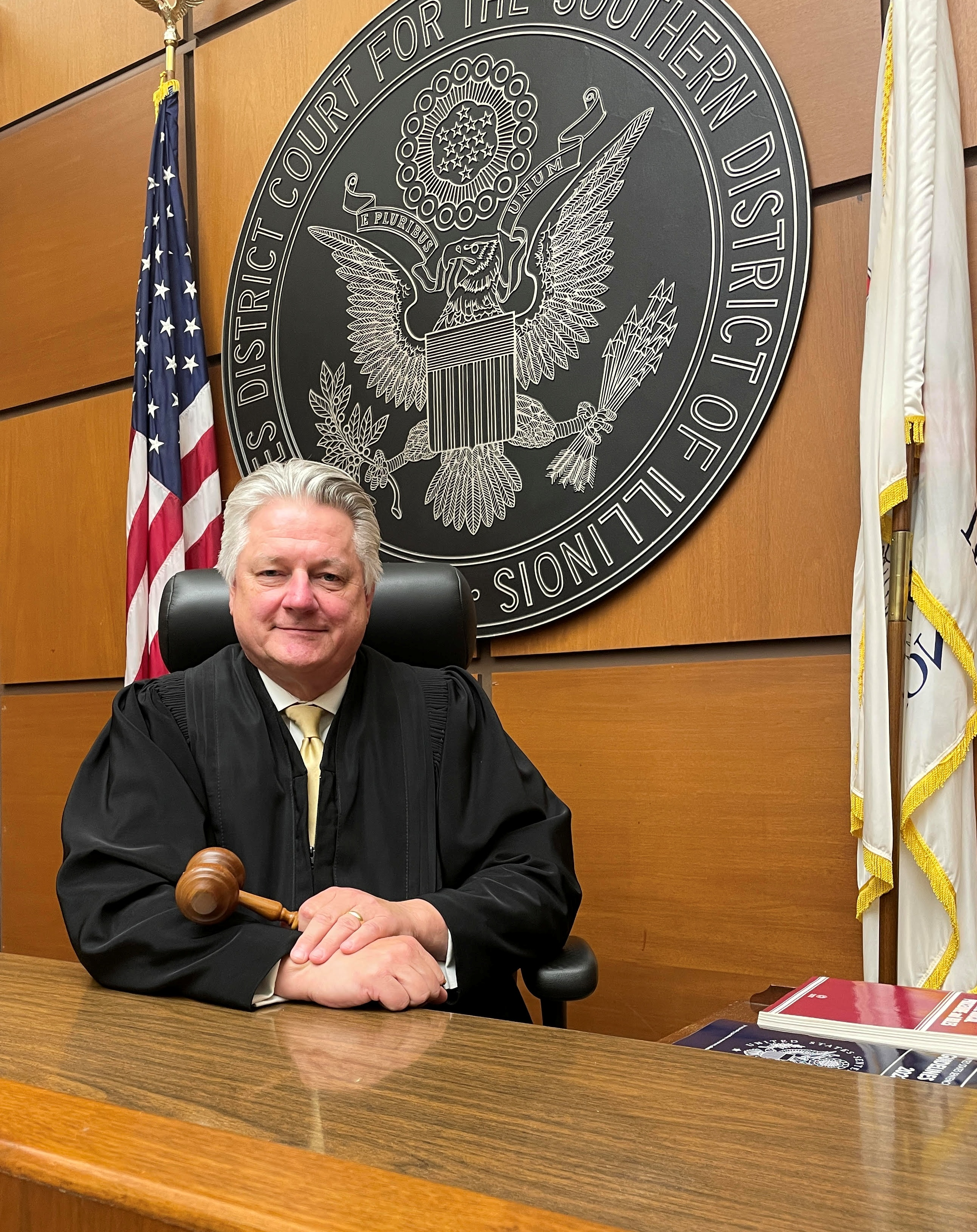

Judge of the United States District Court for the Southern District of Illinois
- Incumbent
- Assumed office September 18, 2020
- Appointed by: Donald Trump
- Preceded by: Michael Joseph Reagan

Judge of the Circuit Court of Illinois for the 20th Judicial Circuit
- In office July 1, 2013 – September 18, 2020
- Appointed by: Supreme Court of Illinois
- In office September 2010 – December 2012
- Appointed by: Supreme Court of Illinois

Justice of the Illinois Appellate Court from the 5th district
- In office July 8, 2005 – December 4, 2006
- Appointed by: Supreme Court of Illinois

Personal details
- Born: 1962 (age 63–64) East St. Louis, Illinois, U.S.
- Party: Republican
- Education: University of Dayton (BA); Saint Louis University (JD)

Stephen Patrick McGlynn (born 1962) is a United States district judge of the United States District Court for the Southern District of Illinois.

== Education ==
McGlynn earned his Bachelor of Arts from the University of Dayton and his Juris Doctor from the Saint Louis University School of Law.

== Legal career ==
McGlynn was in private practice at McGlynn & McGlynn, Attorneys at Law. He has also served as a Special Assistant Attorney General of Illinois from 1996 to 2005 under both Republican and Democrat Attorney Generals. McGlynn served as General Counsel for Kaskaskia Regional Port District.

McGlynn was admitted to practice law in Illinois in 1978, Missouri in 1988, before the U.S. Supreme Court in 1994, and before the 8th Circuit Court of Appeals in 1995.

=== State judicial service ===
On June 8, 2005, the Illinois Supreme Court announced its appointment of McGlynn to succeed Justice Clyde L. Kuehn, an interim appointee, as a justice of the Appellate Court of the 5th Judicial District, effective July 8, 2005.

In 2010, on the recommendation of Judge Lloyd A. Karmeier, the Illinois Supreme Court appointed McGlynn to a judgeship in the St. Clair Circuit Court.

From 2013 to 2020, McGlynn again served as a Judge for the St. Clair County Circuit Court after being appointed by the Supreme Court of Illinois. McGlynn's service as a state court judge ended when he became a federal district judge.

=== Federal judicial service ===
On December 23, 2019, President Donald Trump announced his intent to nominate McGlynn to serve as a United States district judge of the United States District Court for the Southern District of Illinois. On February 4, 2020, his nomination was sent to the United States Senate. President Trump nominated him to the seat vacated by Judge Michael Joseph Reagan, who retired on March 31, 2019. A hearing on his nomination before the Senate Judiciary Committee was held on June 24, 2020. On July 30, 2020, his nomination was reported out of committee by a 13–9 vote. On September 16, 2020, the United States Senate invoked cloture on his nomination by a 55–42 vote. His nomination was confirmed later that day by a 55–41 vote. He received his judicial commission on September 18, 2020.

=== Judicial ratings ===
- Well Qualified (2020) - American Bar Association Committee on Federal Judiciary: unanimous rating
- Highly Qualified (2012) - Illinois State Bar Association rating for the Illinois Appellate Court
- Qualified (2006) - Illinois State Bar Association rating for the Illinois Appellate Court

=== Awards ===
- Illinois Jurist of the Year (2017) - Illinois Family Support and Enforcement Association
- Humanitarian Award (2004) - NAACP East St. Louis Chapter
- Equal Justice for All Award (2002) - NAACP East St. Louis Chapter

== Non-judicial positions ==
- Chairman (2007 to 2020) - Diocesan Review Board for the Catholic Dioces of Belleville; appointed by Bishop Edward Brayton
- Guest Instructor (2018) - Illinois Judicial Conference; Tax Deeds
- Director (2005 to Present) - Catholic Social Services of Southern Illinois; appointed by Bishop Wilton Gregory
- Co-Chairman (2002 to 2005) - Illinois Republican Party
- Committee Member (1998 to 2005) - Illinois Republican State Central Committee, 12th Congressional District.
- Treasurer (1998 to 1999) - St. Louis St. Patrick's Day Parade Committee
- Guest Instructor - Notre Dame Law School; Intensive Trial Advocacy

== Notable opinions ==
- In November 2024, McGlynn held that the Protect Illinois Communities Act, a 2023 law banning assault rifles, large capacity magazines, and other gun accessories, was unconstitutional under the Second Amendment.

Legal offices
| Preceded by Michael N. Cook | Judge of the 20th Judicial Circuit Court of Illinois; 2013–2020 | Vacant |
| Preceded by Michael Joseph Reagan | Judge of the United States District Court for the Southern District of Illinois; 2020–present | Incumbent |
