= Celeste M. Stiehl =

American politician (1925–2026)

Member of the Illinois House of Representatives
- In office 1975–1983

Personal details
- Born: September 7, 1925 St. Louis, Missouri, U.S.
- Died: March 22, 2026 (aged 100) Glen Carbon, Illinois, U.S.
- Party: Republican
- Spouse: William D. Stiehl (died 2016)

Celeste M. Stiehl (née Sullivan; September 7, 1925 – March 22, 2026) was an American politician.

== Life and career ==
Born in St. Louis on September 7, 1925, Stiehl went to Belleville public schools and the Katherine Gibbs School in New York. She was involved with civic and political activities. Stiehl served in the Illinois House of Representatives from 1975 until 1983 and was a Republican. Her husband was William Donald Stiehl who served as a United States District Court judge. Stiehl died on March 22, 2026, at the age of 100.
