= List of University of Illinois Urbana-Champaign people =

This is a list of notable people affiliated with the University of Illinois Urbana-Champaign, a public research university in Illinois.

== Notable alumni ==
Not all listed alumni graduated from the university, and are so noted if the information is known.

=== Nobel Prize winners ===
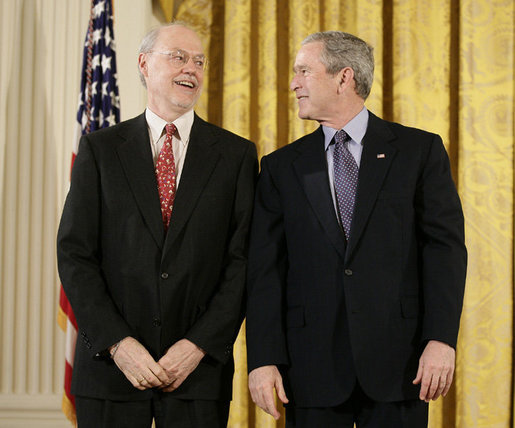
Phillip Allen Sharp with President George W. Bush

- Edward Doisy, B.S. 1914, M.S. 1916 – Physiology or Medicine, 1943
- Vincent Du Vigneaud, B.S. 1923, M.S. 1924 – Chemistry, 1955; also served as faculty member
- Robert W. Holley, B.A. 1942 – Physiology or Medicine, 1968
- Jack Kilby, B.S. 1947 – Physics, 2000; inventor of the integrated circuit
- Edwin G. Krebs, B.A. 1940 – Physiology or Medicine, 1992
- Polykarp Kusch, M.S. 1933, Ph.D. 1936 – Physics, 1955
- John Schrieffer, M.S. 1954, Ph.D. 1957 – Physics, 1972; also served as faculty member
- Phillip Sharp, Ph.D. 1969 – Chemistry, 1993
- Hamilton O. Smith, attended 1948-50 – Physiology or Medicine, 1978
- Wendell Stanley, M.S. 1927, PhD. 1929 – Chemistry 1946
- Omar M. Yaghi, Ph.D. 1990 – Chemistry, 2025
- Rosalyn Yalow, M.S. 1942, Ph.D. 1945 – Physiology or Medicine, 1977

=== Pulitzer Prize winners ===
- Leonora LaPeter Anton, B.S. 1986 – Investigative Journalism, 2016
- Barry Bearak, M.S. 1974 – International Reporting, 2002
- Michael Colgrass, B.A. 1956 – Music, 1978
- George Crumb, M.A. 1952 – Music, 1968
- David Herbert Donald, M.A. 1942, Ph.D. 1946 – Biography, 1961 and 1988
- Roger Ebert, B.S. 1964 – Criticism, 1975
- Roy J. Harris, B.A. 1925 – Public Service, 1950
- Beth Henley – Drama, 1981
- Paul Ingrassia, B.S. 1972 – Beat Reporting, 1993
- Allan Nevins, B.A. 1912, M.A. 1913 – Biography, 1933 and 1937
- Richard Powers, B.A. 1978, M.A. 1980 – Fiction, 2019
- James Reston, B.S. 1932 – National Reporting, 1945 and 1957
- Robert Lewis Taylor, B.A. 1933 – Fiction, 1959
- Carl Van Doren, B.A. 1907 – Biography, 1939
- Mark Van Doren, B.A. 1914 – Poetry, 1940

=== Academia ===
==== Notable professors and scholars ====
- Warren Ambrose, B.S. 1935, M.S. 1936, Ph.D. 1939 – mathematics, professor emeritus of mathematics at MIT; often considered one of the fathers of modern geometry
- Icek Ajzen, M.A. 1967, Ph.D. 1969 – social psychology, professor emeritus at University of Massachusetts Amherst; considered the most influential social psychologist; known by his work on the theory of planned behavior; by 2021 had over 350,000 citations
- Steven Bachrach, B.S., Ph.D. (University of California, Berkeley) – dean of science at Monmouth University, previously the Dr D. R. Semmes Distinguished Professor of Chemistry at Trinity University in San Antonio, Texas
- George C. Baldwin, Ph.D. 1943 – theoretical and experimental physicist; professor of nuclear engineering, at General Electric Company, Rensselaer Polytechnic Institute, and Los Alamos National Laboratory
- John Bardeen – Endowed Chair Emeritus in Electrical and Computer Engineering and Physics at UIUC, member of National Academy of Engineering in Electronics, Communication & Information Systems Engineering and Materials Engineering for contributions to development of semiconductor controlled rectifiers, light emitting diodes, and diode laser, two-time Nobel Prize winner in Physics for work on the transistor and then for the BCS theory of superconductivity
- Nancy Baym, M.A. 1988, Ph.D. 1994 – professor of communication studies at the University of Kansas
- Arnold O. Beckman, B.S. 1922, M.S. 1923 – former professor of chemistry at Caltech
- Saint Elmo Brady, Ph.D. 1916 – notable HBCU educator, first African-American to obtain a Ph.D. degree in chemistry in the United States
- Roger Crossgrove, M.F.A. 1951 – professor of art emeritus at the University of Connecticut
- John Dossey, Ph.D. 1971 – distinguished professor of mathematics at Illinois State University
- Paul S. Dunkin, M.A. 1931, B.S. 1935, Ph.D. 1937 – professor emeritus of library services at Rutgers University
- Daniel Farber, B.A. 1971, M.A. 1972, J.D. 1975 – Sho Sato Professor of Law at the UC Berkeley School of Law
- Abdul Haque Faridi – Bangladeshi academic
- Gerald R. Ferris, Ph.D. 1982 – Francis Eppes Professor of Management and professor of psychology at Florida State University
- Thomas Gillespie, B.S., Ph.D. (University of Florida) – professor and chair of Environmental Sciences at Emory University
- Jessica Greenberg – assistant professor of Anthropology and Russian, East European, and Eurasian Studies
- Marva Griffin Carter, Ph.D. – musicologist, author, and professor of music at Georgia State University
- Allan Hay, Ph.D. 1955 – Tomlinson Emeritus Professor of Chemistry at McGill University
- Nick Holonyak, Jr., B.S. 1950, M.S. 1951, Ph.D. 1954–
- John Honnold, William A. Schnader Professor of Commercial Law at University of Pennsylvania Law School
- Frances A. Karnes, Ph.D. 1973 – Professor at University of Southern Mississippi
- Fakhreddine Karray – Loblaws Research Chair of Artificial Intelligence at the University of Waterloo
- Cheris Kramarae, Ph.D. 1975 – feminist scholar
- Clark R. Landis, B.A. 1980 – academic and professor of chemistry at University of Wisconsin–Madison
- A.C. Littleton, B.S. 1912, M.S. 1918, Ph.D. 1931 – professor and accounting historian at University of Illinois, editor-in-chief of The Accounting Review, Accounting Hall of Fame inductee
- Douglas A. Melton, B.S. – biologist, Xander University Professor at Harvard University
- Jennifer Mercieca, Ph.D. – rhetorical scholar and professor at Texas A&M University, author of Demagogue for president: The Rhetorical Genius of Donald Trump
- Michael Moore – professor of theoretical physics at the University of Manchester
- Andrew R. Neureuther – professor of electrical engineering and computer sciences at the University of California, Berkeley
- James Purdy – scholar of digital rhetoric
- Nora C. Quebral, Ph.D. – proponent of the development communication discipline; Professor Emeritus of development communication at University of the Philippines Los Baños
- Mark Reckase – University Distinguished Professor Emeritus of Michigan State University
- Maurice H. Rees – medical educator and dean of University of Colorado School of Medicine 1925–1945
- Bernard Rosenthal, Ph.D. 1968 – professor emeritus of English at Binghamton University
- Clifford E. Singer – professor emeritus and director of the Program in Arms Control, Disarmament, and International Security
- Jessie Carney Smith, Ph.D. 1964 – librarian emeritus of Fisk University; first African-American to earn a Ph.D. in library science at UI
- Guy Standing, M.A. 1972 – professor of Development Studies at the School of Oriental and African Studies (SOAS), University of London
- William O. Stanley – former professor in the University of Illinois at Urbana-Champaign at the Urbana College of Education
- Gilbert Y. Steiner, Ph.D. 1950 – fourth president of the Brookings Institution
- Dewey Stuit – educational psychologist; dean of the College of Arts at the University of Iowa 1948–1977
- Clyde Summers, B.S. 1939, J.D. 1942 – labor lawyer and law professor at the Yale Law School and University of Pennsylvania Law School, subject of In re Summers
- Maurice Cole Tanquary, A.B. 1907, M.A. 1908, Ph.D. 1912 – professor of entomology at several universities and member of the Crocker Land Expedition
- James Thomson, B.S. 1981 – professor of microbiology, University of Wisconsin – Madison
- Janis Driver Treworgy, M.A. 1983, Ph.D. 1985 – academic and sedimentary geologist
- James Vrentas, B.S. 1958 – chemical engineer
- Juyang Weng, M.Sc. 1985, Ph.D. 1989 – Chinese-American computer engineer, neuroscientist, author, and academic

==== College presidents and vice-presidents ====
- Benjamin J. Allen, M.A. economics 1973; Ph.D. economics 1974 – former president, University of Northern Iowa; former interim president, Iowa State University
- John L. Anderson, M.S., Ph.D. – eighth president, Illinois Institute of Technology; former provost, Case Western Reserve University
- Robert M. Berdahl, M.A. – president of American Association of Universities, former chancellor of UC Berkeley, former president of University of Texas at Austin
- Warren E. Bow, M.A. – president of Wayne State University
- Alvin Bowman, Ph.D. – president, Illinois State University
- Tom Buchanan, Ph.D. – twenty-third president, University of Wyoming
- David L. Chicoine, Ph.D. – president, South Dakota State University
- Coching Chu, B.S. 1913 – sixteenth president, Zhejiang University (National Chekiang University period); former vice president, Chinese Academy of Sciences
- Ralph J. Cicerone, M.S. 1967, Ph.D. 1970 – president, National Academy of Sciences, former chancellor of UC Irvine
- Lewis Collens, B.S., M.A. – seventh president, Illinois Institute of Technology
- John E. Cribbet, J.D. – legal scholar, dean of the University of Illinois College of Law, and chancellor of the University of Illinois
- Lois B. DeFleur, Ph.D. – president, Binghamton University, former provost of University of Missouri
- W. Kent Fuchs, M.S. 1982, Ph.D. 1985 – twelfth president, University of Florida
- Philip Handler, Ph.D. 1939 – president, National Academy of Sciences
- Tori Haring-Smith, Ph.D. – president, Washington & Jefferson College
- Freeman A. Hrabowski III, M.A., Ph.D. – president, University of Maryland, Baltimore County
- Emil Q. Javier, B.S. 1964 – seventeenth president, University of the Philippines
- Alain E. Kaloyeros, Ph.D. 1987 – first president, State University of New York Polytechnic Institute
- Robert W. Kustra, Ph.D. – president, Boise State University
- Judy Jolley Mohraz. Ph.D. 1974 – ninth president, Goucher College
- John Niland, Ph.D. 1970 – fourth president, University of New South Wales, Australia
- J. Wayne Reitz, M.S. 1935 – fifth president, University of Florida
- Steven B. Sample, B.S. 1962, M.S. 1963, Ph.D. 1965 – tenth president, University of Southern California
- David J. Schmidly, Ph.D., – twentieth president, University of New Mexico
- Justin Schwartz, B.S. 1985 – chancellor of the University of Colorado Boulder
- Michael Schwartz, B.S. 1958, M.A. 1959, Ph.D. 1962 – president, Cleveland State University
- James J. Stukel, M.S. 1963, Ph.D. 1968 – fifteenth president, University of Illinois
- Dianne Boardley Suber, M.Ed. 1973 – tenth president of Saint Augustine's University
- William D. Underwood, J.D. – eighteenth president, Mercer University
- Marvin Wachman, Ph.D. – president, Temple University, former president of Lincoln University
- Arnold R. Weber, B.S. 1950 – fourteenth president, Northwestern University
- Herman B Wells – president, Indiana University
- Chen Xujing – vice president, Nankai University and Zhongsan University; president, Lingnan University and Jinan University

==== College provosts and vice provosts ====
- Joseph A. Alutto, M.A. – provost, Ohio State University
- Richard C. Lee, Ph.D. – vice provost, University of Nevada, Las Vegas

=== Architecture ===
- Max Abramovitz, B.S. 1929 – architect on many campus and prominent international buildings including the United Nations Building, Assembly Hall (since renamed to State Farm Center) and the Avery Fisher Hall at Lincoln Center in New York City
- Henry Bacon – architect of the Lincoln Memorial in Washington, D.C.
- Temple Hoyne Buell – architect for the first American central mall
- Jeanne Gang, B.S. 1986 – architect
- Walter Burley Griffin, B. Arch. 1899 – architect and designer of Canberra
- Ralph Johnson, B. Arch 1971 – principal architect of the Perkins&Will
- Arthur Rolland Kelly, B. Arch 1902
- Ron Labinski – founder of HOK Sport
- David Miller, M. Arch 1972 – principal architect of the Miller/Hull partnership, FAIA
- César Pelli, M. Arch. 1954 – architect of the Petronas Twin Towers
- William Pereira, M. Arch. 1930 – notable mid-20th century architect in Los Angeles, known for Transamerica Pyramid and Geisel Library
- Nathan Clifford Ricker, D. Arch. 1871 – first architect to receive a degree in architecture from an American institution
- Patricia Saldaña Natke, B. Arch. 1986 – architect
- William L. Steele – architect of the Prairie School during the early-twentieth century
- Ralph A. Vaughn (1907–2000) – academic, architect and film set designer; founded the Pi Psi chapter of Omega Psi Phi

=== Art ===
- Ivan Albright – painter
- Mark Staff Brandl, B.F.A. 1978 – artist, art historian and critic
- Christopher Brown, B.F.A. 1973 – painter, printmaker, and professor
- Patty Carroll, B.F.A. 1968 – art photographer
- Annie Crawley – underwater photographer
- Greg Drasler, B.F.A. 1980; M.F.A. 1983 – artist and educator
- Leslie Erganian – artist and writer
- Dan Estabrook, M.F.A. 1993 – photographer
- Hart D. Fisher, B.A. 1992 – comics book creator, comics publisher
- Tom Goldenberg, B.F.A. 1970 – artist and educator
- David Klamen, B.F.A. 1983 – artist and academic
- Susan Rankaitis, B.F.A. 1971 – artist
- Angela M. Rivers, B.F.A. 1975 – artist, art curator
- Leo Segedin, B.F.A. 1948; M.F.A. 1950 – artist and educator
- Deb Sokolow, B.A. 1996 – artist
- Lorado Taft – sculptor, writer and educator
- Charles H. Traub, B.A. – photographer and educator
- Don Weeke, B.S. 1969 – fiber and gourd artist
- William Wegman, M. F. A. 1967 – painter and photographer
- Vivian Zapata – painter, official artist of the 2005 Latin Grammys
- Barbara Zeigler – artist

=== Astronauts ===
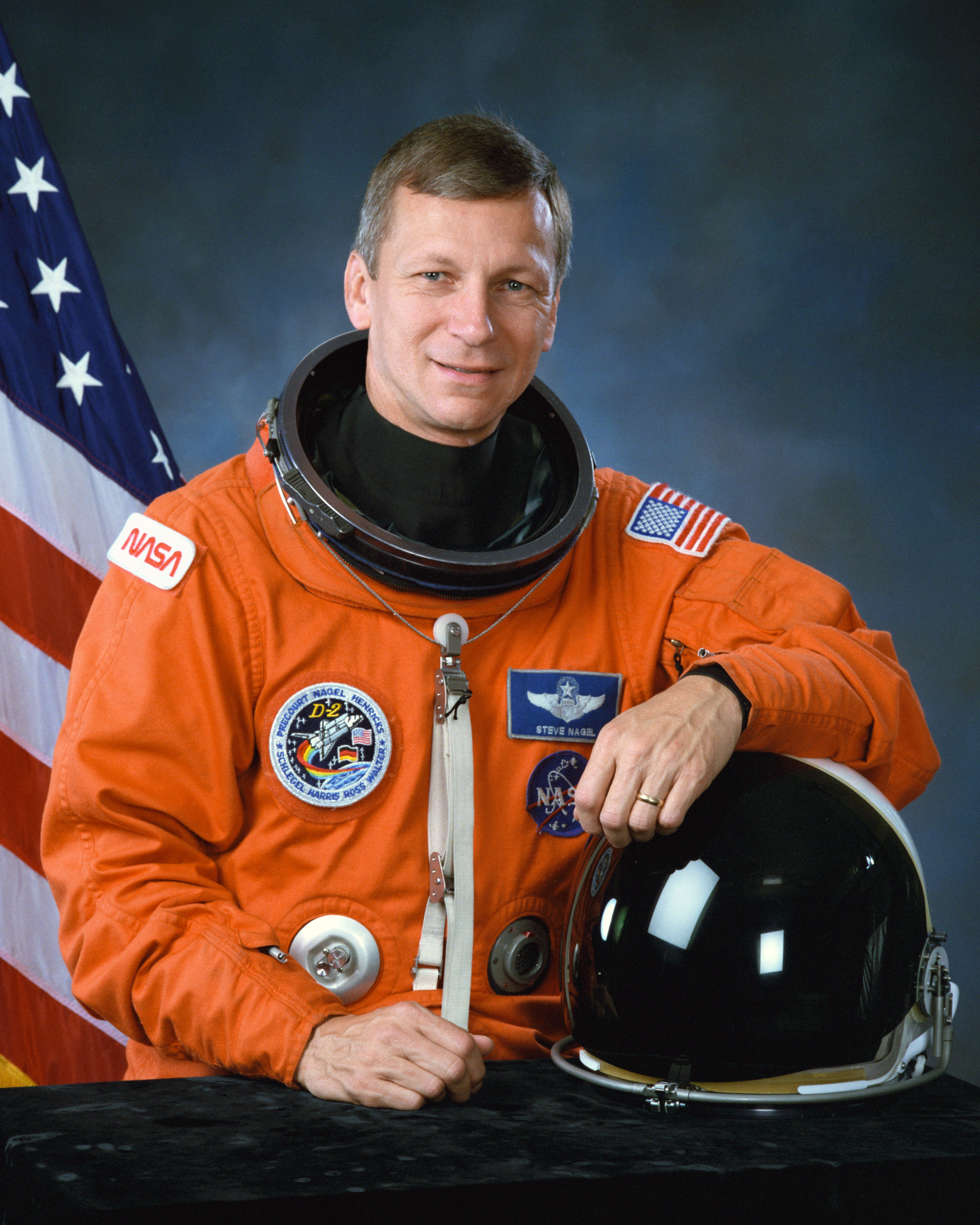
Steven R. Nagel

- Scott Altman, B.S. 1981
- Lee J. Archambault, B.S. 1982, M.S. 1984
- Dale A. Gardner, B.S. 1970
- Michael S. Hopkins, B.S. 1992
- Steven R. Nagel, B.S. 1969
- Joseph R. Tanner, B.S. 1973

=== Business ===
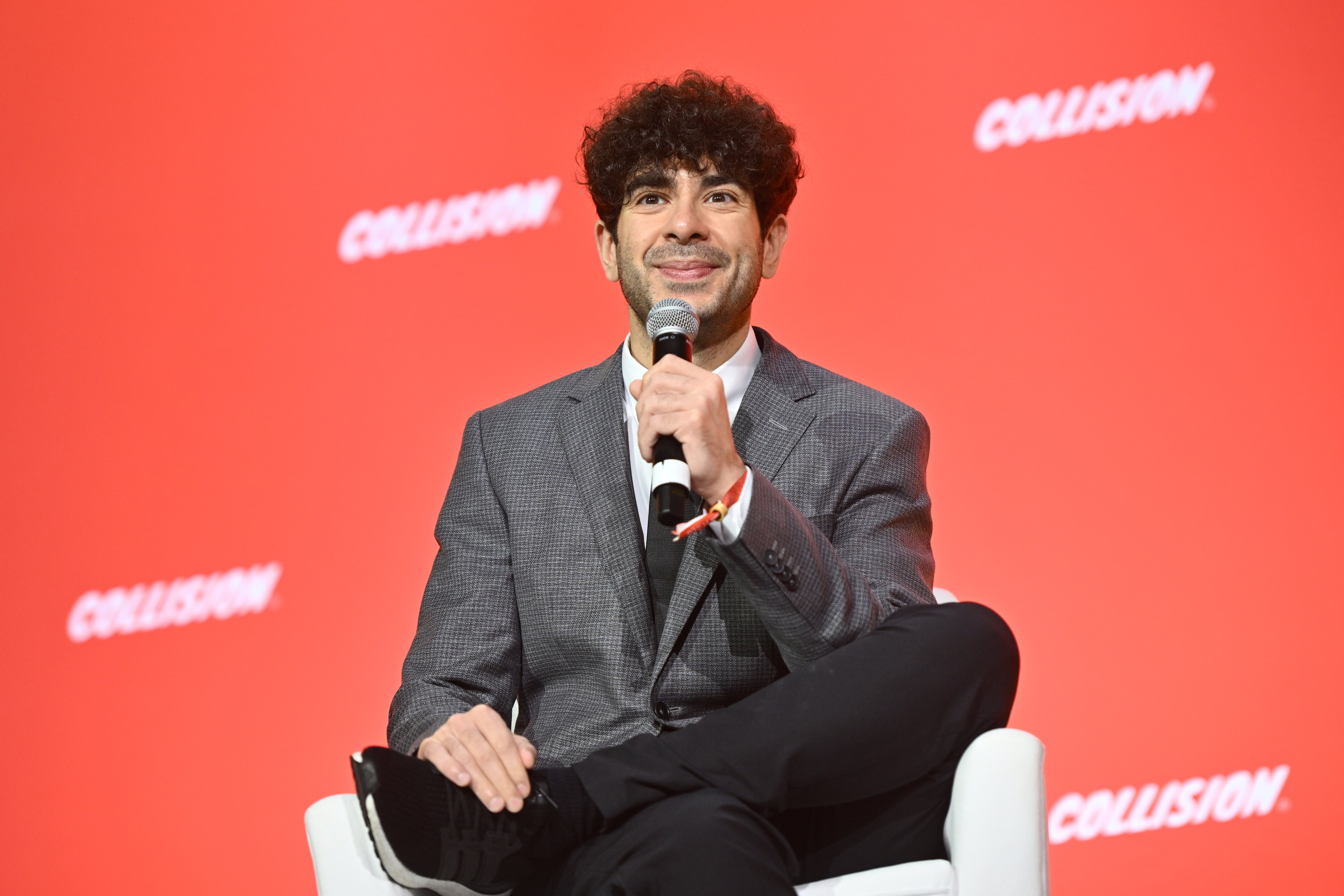
Tony Khan, founder and president of AEW and Ring of Honor

- Irving Azoff, attended – CEO of Ticketmaster (2008–present); executive chairman of Live Nation Entertainment
- Sunil Benimadhu, M.B.A 1992 – chief executive officer of the Stock Exchange of Mauritius (2002–present)
- Jim Cantalupo, 1966 – chairman and chief executive officer of McDonald's (1991–2004)
- Stephen Carley, A.B. circa 1973 – chief executive officer of El Pollo Loco, former president and chief operating officer of Universal City Hollywood
- Jerry Colangelo, B.S. 1962 – president and chief executive officer of Phoenix Suns; managing general partner of Arizona Diamondbacks
- Jon Corzine, A.B. 1969 – chairman and chief executive officer of Goldman Sachs (1994–1999), cross listed in Politics section
- Bob Dudley, B.S. – managing director and chief executive officer-designate of BP
- Martin Eberhard, 1960 – co-founder and chief executive officer of Tesla Motors
- George T. Felbeck, B.S.M.E. 1919, M.S.M.E. 1921 – president of Union Carbide (1944–1962)
- George M.C. Fisher, 1962 – chief executive officer of Eastman Kodak (1993–2000)
- Ravin Gandhi – founder of GMM Nonstick Coatings
- John Georges, 1951 – chief executive officer of International Paper (1985–1996)
- Harry Gray, 1941 – chief executive officer of United Technologies (1974–1986)
- E.B. Harris, 1935 – president of the Chicago Mercantile Exchange
- Robert L. Johnson – founder of Black Entertainment Television; principal owner of the Charlotte Bobcats
- Tony Khan, B.S. 2007 – founder, co-owner, president, and CEO of All Elite Wrestling (AEW); co-owner and senior vice president of football administration & technology for the Jacksonville Jaguars; owner and chairman of Fulham F.C.
- Marcin Kleczynski, B.S. 2012 – founder and CEO of Malwarebytes
- Pete Koomen, M.S. 2006 – co-founder of Optimizely
- Bruce Krasberg, 1930 – business executive and horticulturist
- Michael P. Krasny, B.S. 1975 – founder and chairman emeritus of CDW
- Arvind Krishna, M.S. 1987, Ph.D. 1990 – chief executive officer of IBM
- Stephen McLin, B.S. 1968 – former Bank of America executive
- Christopher Michel, B.A. 1990 – founder and chief executive officer of Military.com (1999–2007); founder and chief executive officer of Affinity Labs
- Steven L. Miller, B.S. 1967 – chief executive officer of Shell Oil (1999–2002)
- Tom Murphy, B.S. 1938 – chairman of General Motors
- Jim Oberweis – chairman of Oberweis Dairy
- Ron Popeil, attended (left after one year) – inventor of the infomercial
- C. W. Post, attended (left after two years) – breakfast cereal magnate
- Jasper Sanfilippo, Sr. – businessman and industrialist who led and substantially grew his family's nut business, John B. Sanfilippo & Son, Inc., into one of the largest in the world
- Abe Saperstein – creator of the Harlem Globetrotters
- Steve Sarowitz (born 1965/1966) – billionaire founder of Paylocity
- Reshma Saujani – founder and CEO of Girls Who Code
- Therese Tucker – CEO and founder of BlackLine
- Barbara Turf – CEO of Crate & Barrel (2008–2012)
- Jack Welch, M.S. 1959, Ph.D. 1961 – chief executive officer of General Electric (1981–2001)
- C. E. Woolman, 1912 – founder of Delta Air Lines
- Yi Gang, Ph.D. 1986 – director of State Administration of Foreign Exchange
- John D. Zeglis, B.S. 1969 – former president of AT&T; former chairman and chief executive officer of AT&T Wireless

=== Engineering and technology ===
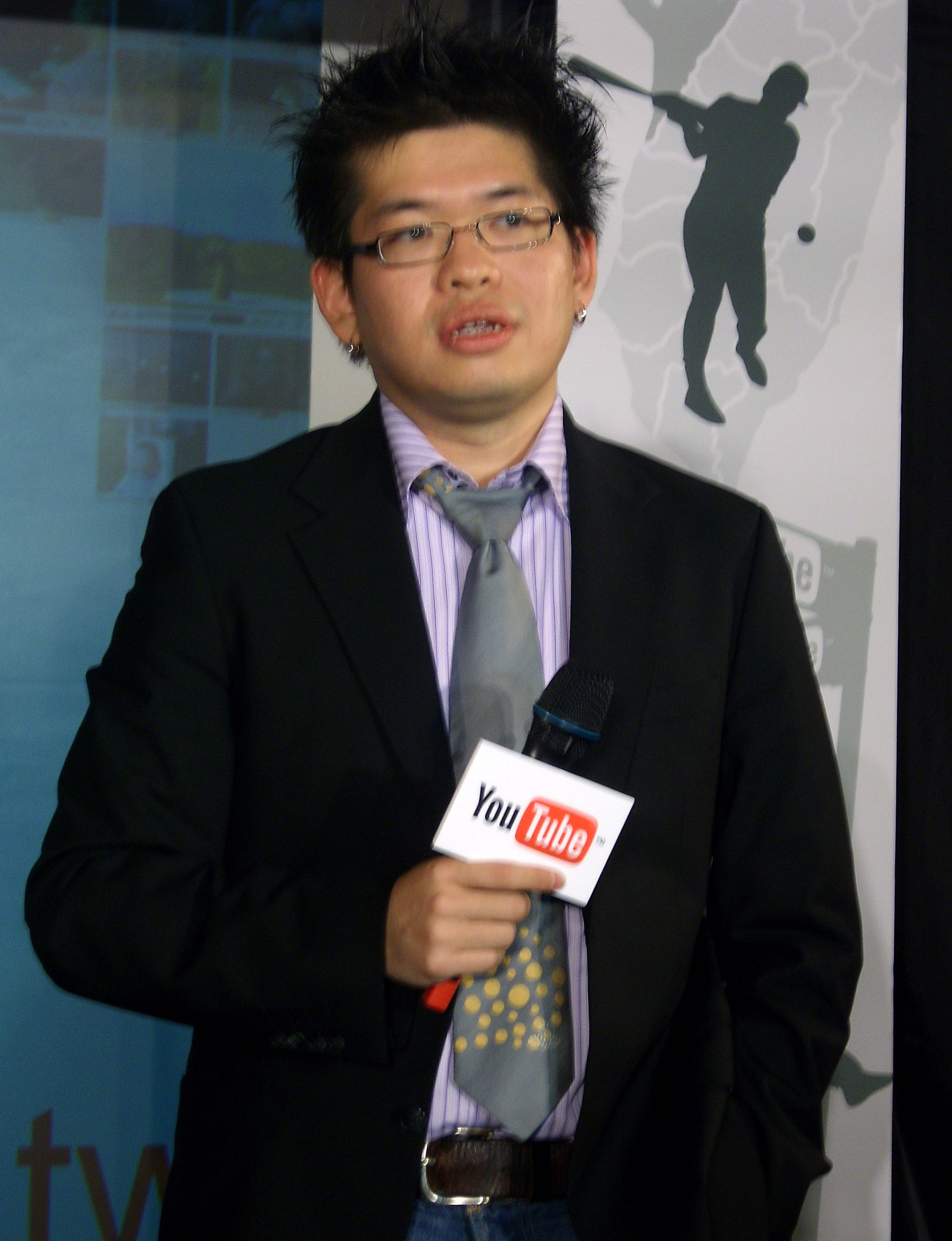
Steve Chen, co-founder of YouTube

- Shoaib Abbasi, B.S. 1980, M.S. 1980 – president and chief executive officer of Informatica
- Harlan Anderson, B.S., M.S. – computer pioneer and founder of Digital Equipment Corporation
- Marc Andreessen, B.S. 1993 – co-creator of Mosaic, co-founder of Netscape, currently co-founder of venture-capital firm Andreessen Horowitz
- Nathan Gettings, B.A. in mathematics, 1998 – co-founder of Palantir.
- Bruce Artwick, M.S. 1976 – creator of Microsoft Flight Simulator
- Algirdas Avižienis, B.S. 1954, M.S. 1955, Ph.D. 1960 – IEEE fellow
- William F. Baker, M.S. 1980 – best known for being the structural engineer of Burj Khalifa, the world's tallest man-made structure
- Ken Batcher, Ph.D. 1969 – ACM/IEEE Eckert-Mauchly Award winner for work on parallel computers
- Arnold O. Beckman, B.S. 1922, M.S. 1923 – inventor of the pH meter, founder of Beckman Instruments; major donor to the university which included a gift to found the Beckman Institute; namesake of the Beckman Quadrangle
- Eric Bina, B.S. 1986, M.S. 1988 – co-creator of the Mosaic and among the first employees of Netscape
- Donald Bitzer, B.S. 1955, M.S. 1956, Ph.D. 1960–2003 – Emmy Award in Technical Achievement for the invention of the plasma display
- Ed Boon, B.S. 1986 – creator of the Mortal Kombat video game series
- Paul Bragiel, B.S. 1999 – co-founder of Meetro & Bragiel Brothers, Colombian National Team cross-country skier
- Keith Brendley, B.S., 1980 – leading authority on active protection systems and president of Artis, a research and development company
- Mike Byster, 1981 – mental calculator, mathematician
- Steve Chen – co-founder of YouTube
- Yixin Chen – professor of Computer Science and Engineering at Washington University in St. Louis
- Ven Te Chow, Ph.D. – professor of hydrology
- John Cioffi, B.S. 1978 – father of DSL (broadband internet connection), Marconi Prize winner, founder of Amati Communications (sold to Texas Instruments), IEEE Fellow
- Jason David Danielson, B.S. – comedian in Japan
- Alan M. Davis, M.S. 1973, Ph.D. 1975 – IEEE Fellow for contributions to software engineering, author, entrepreneur
- Lemuel Davis, M.S. – software engineer in the field of computer animation; winner of a 1992 Academy of Motion Picture Arts and Sciences Scientific and Engineering Award
- James DeLaurier, B.S. – designed the first microwave-powered aircraft, the first engine-powered ornithopter, and the first human-carrying ornithopter
- Daniel W. Dobberpuhl, B.S. 1967 – creator of Alpha and StrongARM microprocessors at DEC
- Steve Dorner, B.S. 1983 – creator of Eudora
- Russell Dupuis, B.S. 1970, M.S. 1971, Ph.D. 1972 – professor at the Georgia Institute of Technology; co-recipient of the 2002 National Medal of Technology; awarded the 2007 IEEE Edison Medal; pioneer in metalorganic chemical vapor deposition and the commercialization of LEDs
- Brendan Eich, M.S. 1986 – creator of JavaScript; chief technology officer of Mozilla Corporation
- Larry Ellison, attended (left after sophomore year) – founder of Oracle Corporation
- Walter Gonzalez Gonzalez, M.S. 1956 - president of the Society of Bolivian Engineers (1965-66), chief of the Alto Beni project, dean of school of engineering at the Universidad Mayor de San Andres (UMSA), Fulbright scholar, founding member of The National Geographic Society's "Cartographer's Circle" for his exploration of the Bolivian Amazon basin in the early 1960s.
- Michael Hart, B.A. 1973 – founder of Project Gutenberg
- Tomlinson Holman, B.S. 1968 – creator of THX, professor at the USC School of Cinematic Arts
- John C. Houbolt, B.S. 1940, M.S. 1942 – retired NASA engineer who successfully promoted lunar orbit rendezvous for Apollo Space Program
- Jawed Karim, B.S. 2004 – co-founder of YouTube
- Fazlur Khan, Ph.D. 1955 – designer and builder of the Sears Tower, the tallest building in the world when it was built in 1973
- Shahid Khan, B.S. 1971 – owner of the Jacksonville Jaguars; owner of Fulham F.C.; founder and CEO of Flex-N-Gate; recipient of the Mechanical Science and Engineering Distinguished Alumni Award (1999)
- Ed Krol – author of Whole Internet User's Guide and Catalog
- Chris Lattner – author of LLVM and related projects, such as the compiler Clang and the programming language Swift; Tesla Motors's vice president of autopilot software
- Max Levchin, B.S. 1997 – co-founder of PayPal
- Jenny Levine, M.L.I.S. 1992 – evangelist for library technology and American Library Association Internet strategist
- Russel Simmons – co-founder and chief technical officer of Yelp!
- Bob Miner, B.A. (mathematics) 1963 – co-founder of Oracle Corporation
- Ray Ozzie, B.S. 1979 – creator of Lotus Notes cofounder of Lotus, co-president of Microsoft
- Anna Patterson, Ph.D. 1988 – vice president of Engineering, Artificial Intelligence at Google and co-founder of Cuil
- Emily S. Patterson, M.S., 1996, Ph.D., 1999 – professor at Ohio State University College of Medicine
- Cecil Peabody – writer, graduate of MIT (1877) and professor at MIT
- Jerry Sanders, B.S. 1958 – co-founder and former chief executive officer of Advanced Micro Devices
- Peter Shirley, Ph.D. 1991 – Distinguished Scientist at NVIDIA recognized for contributions to real time ray tracing
- Thomas Siebel, B.A. 1975, M.B.A. 1983, M.S. 1985 – founder of Siebel Systems
- H. Gene Slottow, Ph.D. 1964 – 2003 Emmy Award in Technical Achievement for the invention of the plasma display
- Nadine Barrie Smith, B.S. 1985, M.S. 1989, Ph.D. 1996 – biomedical researcher in therapeutic ultrasound
- Jeremy Stoppelman – co-founder and chief executive officer of Yelp!
- Bill Stumpf – designer of the Aeron and Ergon ergonomic chairs
- Jakub Szefer, B.S. – computer engineering professor
- Parisa Tabriz – head of security at Google Chrome
- Mark Tebbe, B.S. 1983 – co-founder of Lante Corporation and Answers.com
- Craig Vetter, BFA Industrial Design c. 1966 – founder of Vetter Fairing Company and Motorcycle Hall of Fame inductee
- Kevin Warwick, Senior Beckman Fellow, 2004 – cyborg scientist, University of Reading

=== Journalism and non-fiction broadcasting ===
- Jabari Asim, scholar-in-residence 2008–2010 – former editor-in-chief of The Crisis, The Washington Post Book World deputy editor, columnist; author
- Dan Balz, B.A. 1968, M.A. 1972 – Washington Post national political reporter and editor; author
- Claudia Cassidy, 1921 – Chicago Tribune music and drama critic
- John Chancellor – political analyst and newscaster for NBC Nightly News
- Roger Ebert, B.S. 1964 – film critic
- Sean Evans, B.A. 2008 – host of YouTube series Hot Ones
- Bill Geist, 1968 – CBS News correspondent
- Robert Goralski, 1949 – NBC News correspondent
- Bob Grant – radio talk show personality
- Steven Hager – editor of High Times and founder of the Cannabis Cup
- Herb Keinon – columnist and journalist for The Jerusalem Post
- Frederick C Klein, B.A. 1959 – sportswriter for The Wall Street Journal and author
- Will Leitch – writer and founding editor of Deadspin
- Jane Marie, B.A. 2002 – journalist and podcaster, former producer of This American Life and founder of Little Everywhere
- Carol Marin, A.B. 1970 – former news anchor; 60 Minutes correspondent; Illinois Journalist of the Year (1988)
- Tom Merritt, B.S. journalism – technology journalist and broadcaster on TWiT.tv
- Charlie Meyerson, B.S., 1977; M.S., 1978, journalism – radio, newspaper and internet reporter
- Robert Novak, B.A. 1952 – political commentator and columnist
- Suze Orman, B.A. 1976 – financial adviser and author
- Steve Osunsami, B.S. 1993 – senior national correspondent, ABC News
- Reginald Owens – journalist
- Ian Punnett – radio talk-show personality, and Saturday-night host of Coast to Coast AM
- Marcus Eli Ravage, M.A. 1910 – author and journalist, known for An American in the Making (1917) and as European correspondent for The Nation; honorary member of Phi Beta Kappa 1933
- B. Mitchel Reed, B.S., M.A. – radio personality in Los Angeles and New York City
- Taylor Rooks, B.S. broadcast journalism – Big Ten Network television personality and sideline reporter
- Dan Savage – advice columnist ("Savage Love") and theater director
- Gene Shalit, 1949 – film critic
- Loren Tate – sports journalist
- Patricia Thompson, 1969 – film and television producer
- Terry Teachout, M.A. music – theater critic and writer
- Douglas Wilson – television personality and designer (Trading Spaces)
- Gregor Ziemer – author and journalist, provided expert testimony during the Nuremberg Trials

=== Literature ===
- Nelson Algren, B.S. 1931 – author of 1950 National Book Award-winning The Man With the Golden Arm
- William Attaway, B.A. 1935 – author of Blood on the Forge
- Ann Bannon, B.A. 1955 – pulp-fiction writer, author of The Beebo Brinker Chronicles
- Marianne Boruch, B.A. 1972 – poet
- Dee Brown, M.S. 1951 – author of Bury My Heart at Wounded Knee
- John F. Callahan, M.A., Ph.D. – literary executor for Ralph Ellison
- Iris Chang, B.A. 1989 – author of The Rape of Nanking
- Mary Tracy Earle (1864–1955) – author
- Dave Eggers, attended 1980s and 90s, B.S. 2002 – author of A Heartbreaking Work of Staggering Genius, What Is the What, and Zeitoun
- Stanley Elkin, B.A. 1952, Ph.D. 1961 – National Book Critics Circle Award winner for George Mills in 1982 and for Mrs. Ted Bliss in 1995
- Lee Falk, 1932 – creator of The Phantom and Mandrake the Magician
- Rolando Hinojosa, Ph.D. 1969 – author of Klail City Death Trip Series
- Irene Hunt, B.A. 1939 – Newbery Medal-winning author of Up a Road Slowly
- Richmond Lattimore, Ph.D. 1935 – poet; translator of the Iliad and the Odyssey
- William Keepers Maxwell, Jr., B.A. 1930 – novelist and fiction editor of The New Yorker (1936–1976)
- Tulika Mehrotra, B.A 2002 – author of Delhi Stopover and Crashing B-Town; writer for magazines including Harper's Bazaar, Vogue, India Today, and Men's Health
- Nnedi Okorafor, B.A. 1996 – author of Binti, Who Fears Death, and Akata Witch
- Porsha Olayiwola, B.A. 2010 – Afrofuturist writer and poet laureate of Boston
- Harry Mark Petrakis, attended – novelist
- Richard Powers, M.A. 1979 – novelist and writer
- Shel Silverstein, attended (expelled) – poet, singer-songwriter, musician, composer, cartoonist, screenwriter and author of children's books (Where the Sidewalk Ends)
- Will Schwartz, M.F.A. 2018 – The 2017 winner of The Briar Cliff Review literature prize and singer-songwriter.
- Anne Valente, M.S. 2007 – novelist, author of Our Hearts Will Burn Us Down and By Light We Knew Our Name
- Larry Woiwode, 1964 – poet and novelist

=== Media ===
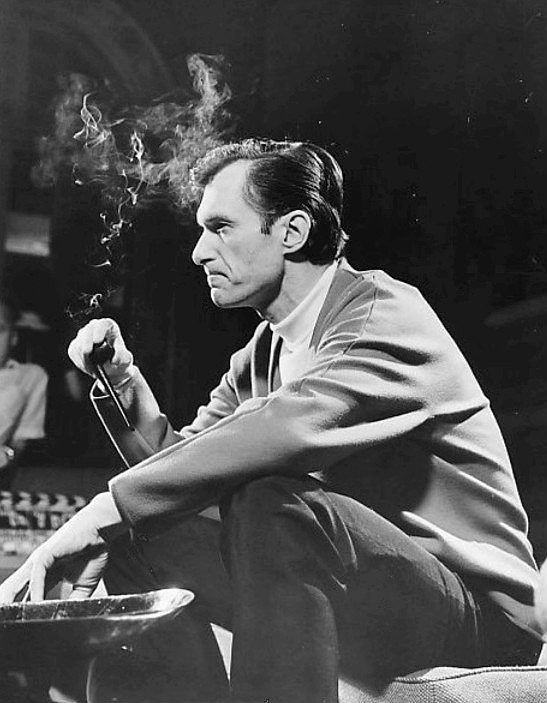
Hugh Hefner, cultural icon and founder of Playboy magazine

- Robert "Buck" Brown – Playboy cartoonist, creator of the libidinous "Granny" character, whose drawings also regularly addressed racial equality issues
- Dianne Chandler – Playboy Playmate of the Month, 1966
- Mina Sue Choi – South Korean media personality, Miss Earth 2022
- Christina Ernst – social media content creator
- Judith Ford (Judi Nash), B.S. – Miss America 1969
- Brant Hansen – radio personality for Air 1 network
- Erika Harold – Miss America 2003
- Hugh Hefner, B.A. 1949 – founder of Playboy magazine and entertainment
- Nicole Hollander, B.A. 1960 – syndicated cartoonist of Sylvia
- James Holzhauer, B.S. 2005 – Jeopardy record-breaker and professional gambler
- Ken Paulson, J.D. – editor-in-chief of USA Today (2004–2008)
- Henry Petroski, Ph.D. 1968 – civil engineer and writer
- Irna Phillips, 1923 – creator of the soap opera

=== Military ===
- Lew Allen, Jr., M.S. 1952, Ph.D. 1954 – chief of staff of the United States Air Force
- Kenneth D. Bailey 1935 – Medal of Honor recipient
- Casper H. Conrad Jr., B.S. 1922 – U.S. Army brigadier general
- Reginald C. Harmon, LLB 1927 – first United States Air Force Judge Advocate General
- Thomas R. Lamont, J.D. 1972 – United States Assistant Secretary of the Army (Manpower and Reserve Affairs)
- Ronald F. Silva – U.S. Coast Guard rear admiral
- Jerald D. Slack – U.S. Air National Guard major general, adjutant general of Wisconsin
- Herbert Sobel – U.S. Army lieutenant colonel, commander of Easy Company, 506th Infantry Regiment during World War II, featured in Band of Brothers
- Eugene L. Tattini – U.S. Air Force lieutenant general
- David M. Van Buren, B.S. 1971 – Assistant Secretary of the Air Force (Acquisition)

=== Music ===
- Anton Armstrong – choral director
- Jay Bennett – musician for band Wilco
- Charles L. Bestor – composer and music educator
- Marty Casey, B.A. – lead vocalist of the band Lovehammers
- Rene Clausen – composer, conductor
- Ron Dewar – jazz saxophonist
- Alexander Djordjevic – pianist
- Neal Doughty, attended late 1960s – keyboard player and founding member of REO Speedwagon
- Dan Fogelberg – singer-songwriter
- GAWNE – rapper, singer, and songwriter
- Nathan Gunn – baritone, opera singer
- John B. Haberlen – director of Georgia State University school of music
- Jerry Hadley – opera singer
- Chan Hing-yan – composer and music educator
- Kenneth Jennings – composer and music educator
- Craig Hella Johnson – choir conductor
- Curtis Jones – house music producer
- Mike Kinsella, 1999 – indie-rock musician; frontman of the band American Football
- Brian Krock – multi-instrumentalist, composer, arranger and bandleader of Big Heart Machine and liddle
- Carolyn Kuan – conductor, pianist, music director for Hartford Symphony Orchestra
- Jeffrey Kurtzman – musicologist and music editor
- Jim McNeely – jazz pianist, composer, and arranger
- Donald Nally – choral director
- Bob Nanna – indie-rock musician; founder of the bands Friction, Braid, Hey Mercedes, and The City on Film
- John Pierce (born 1959) – operatic tenor and academic voice teacher
- Noam Pikelny – banjo player; recipient of Steve Martin Award for Excellence in Banjo and Bluegrass
- Psalm One – hip-hop artist
- Mary McCarty Snow – composer
- The Male Pattern, M.F.A. 2018 – singer-songwriter.
- John Summit – house music producer
- SuperKnova – guitarist and indie-pop musician, singer, and producer
- Matt Wertz – singer-songwriter
- Brian Courtney Wilson – Grammy-nominated gospel artist

=== Performing arts ===
- Ruth Attaway – Broadway and film actress (You Can't Take It With You, Raintree County, Porgy and Bess, and Being There)
- Barbara Bain, B.S. – winner of three consecutive Emmy Awards for the role of Cinnamon Carter in Mission: Impossible
- Betsy Brandt, B.F.A. 1996 – television actress (Marie Schrader in Breaking Bad)
- Timothy Carhart – film and television actor (Pink Cadillac, The Hunt for Red October)
- Terrence Connor Carson – singer and stage, voice, and television actor
- Arden Cho – actress
- Andrew Davis – film director (The Fugitive)
- Janice Ferri Esser, B.F.A. 1981, M.S. 1982 – Daytime Emmy-winning writer (The Young & the Restless)
- Dominic Fumusa, M.F.A. 1994 – actor (Nurse Jackie)
- Grant Gee – film director (Meeting People Is Easy)
- Nancy Lee Grahn, briefly attended – Daytime Emmy-winning actress
- Gene Hackman, attended – five-time Academy Award-nominated actor
- Jonathan Hammond – film director (We All Die Alone)
- Shanola Hampton – actor (Shameless)
- Arte Johnson, 1949 – Laugh-In television personality
- Margaret Judson – television actress (The Newsroom)
- Chris Landreth, B.S. 1984, M.S. 1986 – Academy Award-winning animator (Best Animated Short Film, 2004, '"Ryan")
- Ang Lee, B.F.A. 1980 – Academy Award-winning movie director (Best Director, 2005, Brokeback Mountain; 2012, Life of Pi)
- Ned Luke, 1979 – actor (Grand Theft Auto V)
- John Franklin, 1983– Isaac (Children of the Corn (1984 film))
- Mary Elizabeth Mastrantonio, 1980 – actress (Scarface, Robin Hood: Prince of Thieves, The Color of Money)
- John McNaughton – film and television director (Henry: Portrait of a Serial Killer, Wild Things)
- Ryan McPartlin – actor (Chuck)
- Donna Mills – film and television actress (Knots Landing)
- Ben Murphy – television actor (Alias Smith and Jones)
- Lucas Neff – actor (Raising Hope)
- Nick Offerman, 1993 – actor (Parks and Recreation)
- Jerry Orbach, B.A. – Broadway, film and television actor (Dirty Dancing, Detective Lennie Briscoe in Law & Order)
- Peter Palmer – actor and singer; played "Li'l Abner" on Broadway and film
- Larry Parks – Academy Award-nominated actor; blacklisted in Hollywood after testifying before the House Un-American Activities Committee
- Andy Richter, briefly attended – actor and Conan O'Brien sidekick
- Alan Ruck – actor (Ferris Bueller's Day Off, Star Trek Generations, Spin City, Succession)
- Jonathan Sadowski – actor ($#*! My Dad Says)
- Allan Sherman – comedian (known for the Grammy Award-winning novelty song "Hello Muddah, Hello Faddah"; television writer and producer (co-creator of I've Got a Secret)
- Jessica Steinrock – intimacy coordinator and TikToker
- Sushanth, B.E. – Telugu actor
- Lynne Thigpen, B.A. 1970–1997 – Tony Award-winning actress (Where in the World Is Carmen Sandiego?)
- Prashanth Venkataramanujam, B.S. 2009 – television comedy writer and producer
- Grant Williams – film actor (The Incredible Shrinking Man) and operatic tenor
- Roger Young, M.S. – Emmy Award-winning TV and movie director

=== Politics and government ===
==== U.S. Senate ====
- Juliana Stratton, BS 1987 – United States Senator-elect (Illinois, 2027-); 48th Lieutenant Governor of Illinois(2019-2027); [Illinois House of Representatives](2017-2019).
- Carol Moseley Braun – first African-American female United States senator (Illinois, 1993–1999); U.S. ambassador to New Zealand and Samoa (1999–2001)
- Prentiss M. Brown – United States senator from Michigan (1936–1943); U.S. representative from Michigan (1933–1936)
- Jon Corzine, A.B. 1969 – governor of New Jersey (2006–2010) and U.S. senator from New Jersey (2001–2006), cross listed in Business section
- Alan J. Dixon, B.S. – United States senator from Illinois (1981–1993); 34th Illinois Secretary of State
- John Porter East, Law, 1959 – United States senator from North Carolina (1981–1986)
- Kelly Loeffler, B.S. 1992 – administrator of the Small Business Administration (2025–present) and United States senator from Georgia (2020–2021)

==== U.S. House of Representatives ====
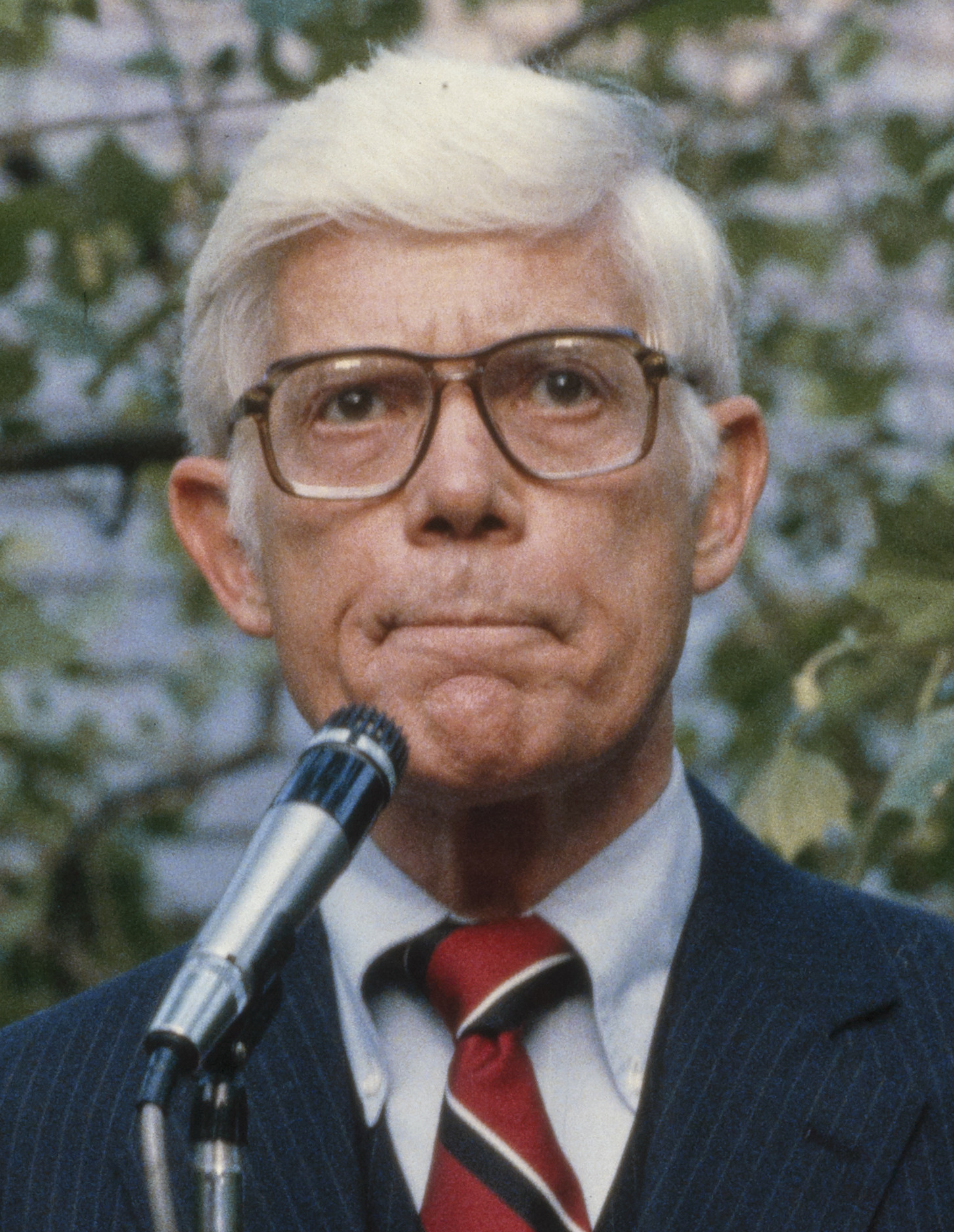
Rep. John Anderson in 1980

- John Anderson – U.S. representative from Illinois (1961–1981); 1980 presidential candidate
- Willis J. Bailey, 1879 – United States representative and the 16th Governor of Kansas
- Terry L. Bruce – U.S. representative from Illinois's 19th congressional district (1985–1993); earned B.A. in 1966 and J.D. in 1969
- Larry Bucshon – U.S. representative from Indiana (since 2011)
- Nikki Budzinski – U.S. representative from Illinois (Since 2023)
- Edwin V. Champion – U.S. representative from Illinois (1937–1939)
- Donald C. Dobbins – U.S. representative from Illinois (1933–1937)
- William J. Graham, B.L. 1893 – U.S. representative from Illinois (1917–1924)
- George Evan Howell, B.S. 1927, LL.B. 1930 – U.S. representative from Illinois (1941–1947)
- Jesse Jackson, Jr., J.D. 1993 – U.S. representative from Illinois (1995–2012)
- Tim Johnson, B.A. 1969, J.D. 1972 – U.S. representative from Illinois (2001–2013)
- Lynn Morley Martin, B.A. 1960 – U.S. representative from Illinois (1981–1991) and secretary of labor in the cabinet of George H. W. Bush (1991–1993)
- Peter Roskam, B.A. 1983 – U.S. representative from Illinois (since 2007), House Republican Chief Deputy Whip (2011–2014)
- Kurt Schrader, B.S. 1975, D.V.M. 1977 – U.S. representative from Oregon (since 2009)
- Jan Schakowsky, B.S. 1965 – U.S. representative from Illinois (since 1999)
- Steve Schiff, B.A. 1968 – U.S. representative from New Mexico (1989–1998)
- Harold H. Velde, J.D. 1937 – U.S. representative from Illinois (1949–1957)
- Jerry Weller, B.S. 1979 – U.S. representative from Illinois (1995–2009)

==== Executive branch officials ====
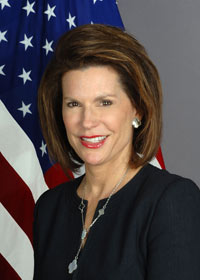
Ambassador Nancy G. Brinker

- Nancy Brinker, 1968 – founder of Susan G. Komen for the Cure; Chief of Protocol of the United States, United States ambassador to Hungary (2001–2003)
- Mark Filip, B.A. 1988 – acting attorney general of the United States (2009); deputy attorney general of the United States (2008–2009); judge for the U.S. District Court for the Northern District of Illinois (2004–2008)
- William Marion Jardine – served as the United States secretary of agriculture and the U.S. ambassador to Egypt
- Neel Kashkari, B.S. 1995, M.S. 1997 – interim assistant secretary of the treasury for financial stability in the United States Department of the Treasury
- Julius B. Richmond, B.S., M.S. 1939 – 12th United States Surgeon General and the United States Assistant Secretary for Health (1977–1981); vice admiral in the United States Public Health Service Commissioned Corps; first national director of Project Head Start
- Samuel K. Skinner, 1960 – secretary of transportation (1989–1991); White House chief of staff during the George H. W. Bush Administration (1992)
- Louis E. Sola, M.S. 1998 – commissioner, Federal Maritime Commission
- Phillips Talbot – United States diplomat, United States ambassador to Greece (1965–1969)

==== Statewide offices ====
- Leslie Munger – former Illinois comptroller (2015–2017)
- Russell Olson, attended – 39th lieutenant governor of Wisconsin (1979–1983)
- Ashton C. Shallenberger – 15th governor of Nebraska
- Samuel H. Shapiro – 34th governor of Illinois (1968); 38th lieutenant governor of Illinois (1961–1968)
- Juliana Stratton – 48th lieutenant governor of Illinois
- Frank White, 1880 – eighth governor of North Dakota

==== State legislators ====
- Paul Faraci, B.S. 1989 – Illinois State Senate (2023–present)
- Tom Fink, J.D. 1952 – speaker of the Alaska House of Representatives (1973), mayor of Anchorage (1987–1994)
- Allen J. Flannigan – Wisconsin state assemblyman (1957–1966)
- Jehan Gordon-Booth – Illinois House of Representatives (since 2009)
- Chuck Graham, B.S. 1987 – Missouri House of Representatives (1996–2002), Missouri State Senate 2004
- Kiah Morris, B.S. 2006 – Vermont House of Representatives (since 2014)
- David S. Olsen, B.S. 2011 – Illinois House of Representatives (since 2016–2019)
- Aaron Ortiz, B.A. 2013 – Illinois House of Representatives, Chicago 14th Ward committeeman (since 2018)
- Robert W. Pritchard – Illinois House of Representatives (since 2003), former chairman of the DeKalb County Board (1998–2003)
- Thomas P. Sinnett, 1909 – Illinois House of Representatives (1924–1940), Democratic Party floor leader (1932–1934)

==== Judiciary ====
- Wayne Andersen, J.D. 1970 – judge of the United States District Court for the Northern District of Illinois
- Harold Baker, J.D. 1956 – judge of the United States District Court for the Central District of Illinois
- Charles Guy Briggle, LL.B. 1904 – judge of the United States District Court for the Southern District of Illinois
- Colin S. Bruce, B.A. 1986, J.D. 1989 – judge of the United States District Court for the Central District of Illinois
- Owen McIntosh Burns, B.A. 1916, LL.B. 1921 – judge of the United States District Court for the Western District of Pennsylvania
- Thomas R. Chiola, J.D. 1977 – judge of the Illinois Circuit Court of Cook County, first openly gay elected official in Illinois
- Brian Cogan, B.A. 1975 – judge of the United States District Court for the Eastern District of New York
- Bernard Martin Decker, B.A. 1926 – judge of the United States District Court for the Northern District of Illinois
- Arno H. Denecke, LL.B. 1939 – chief justice of the Oregon Supreme Court
- Richard Everett Dorr, B.S. 1965 – judge of the United States District Court for the Western District of Missouri
- Thomas M. Durkin, B.S. 1975 – judge of the United States District Court for the Northern District of Illinois
- Mark Filip, B.A. 1988 – judge of the United States District Court for the Northern District of Illinois
- James L. Foreman, B.S. 1950, J.D. 1952 – judge of the United States District Court for the Southern District of Illinois
- Rita B. Garman, B.S. 1965 – justice of the Illinois Supreme Court (since 2001)
- John Phil Gilbert, B.S. 1971 – judge of the United States District Court for the Southern District of Illinois
- William J. Graham, B.L. 1893 – judge of the United States Court of Customs and Patent Appeals
- James F. Holderman, B.S. 1968, J.D. 1971 – judge of the United States District Court for the Northern District of Illinois
- George Evan Howell, B.S. 1927, LL.B. 1930 – judge of the United States Court of Claims
- William F. Jung, J.D. 1983 – judge of the United States District Court for the Middle District of Florida
- Frederick J. Kapala, J.D. 1976 – judge of the United States District Court for the Northern District of Illinois
- Lloyd A. Karmeier, B.A. 1962, J.D. 1964 – justice of the Illinois Supreme Court (since 2004)
- Alfred Younges Kirkland Sr., B.A. 1941, J.D. 1943 – judge of the United States District Court for the Northern District of Illinois
- Ray Klingbiel, LL.B. 1924 – chief justice of the Illinois Supreme Court
- Walter C. Lindley, LL.B. 1904, J.D. 1910 – judge of the United States Court of Appeals for the Seventh Circuit
- J. Warren Madden, B.A. 1911 – judge of the United States Court of Claims
- George M. Marovich, B.S. 1952, J.D. 1954 – judge of the United States District Court for the Northern District of Illinois
- Prentice Marshall, B.S. 1949, J.D. 1951 – judge of the United States District Court for the Northern District of Illinois
- William J. Martinez, B.A. 1977, B.S. 1977 – judge of the United States District Court for the District of Colorado
- Frederick Olen Mercer, LL.B. 1924 – judge of the United States District Court for the Southern District of Illinois
- Patricia Millett, B.A. 1985 – judge of the United States Court of Appeals for the District of Columbia Circuit
- Ramon Ocasio III – 6th Judicial Subcircuit judge, Cook County, Illinois (since 2006)
- George True Page – judge of the United States Court of Appeals for the Seventh Circuit
- Casper Platt, B.A. 1914 – judge of the United States District Court for the Eastern District of Illinois
- Philip Godfrey Reinhard, B.A. 1962, J.D. 1964 – judge of the United States District Court for the Northern District of Illinois
- Scovel Richardson, B.A. 1934, M.A. 1936 – judge of the United States Court of International Trade
- Nancy J. Rosenstengel, B.A. 1990 – judge of the United States District Court for the Southern District of Illinois
- Stanley Julian Roszkowski, B.S. 1949, J.D. 1954 – judge of the United States District Court for the Northern District of Illinois
- Howard C. Ryan – chief justice of the Illinois Supreme Court
- Roy Solfisburg, J.D. 1940 – chief justice of the Illinois Supreme Court
- Robert C. Underwood, LL.B. 1939 – justice of the Illinois Supreme Court (1962–1984)
- Fred Louis Wham, LL.B. 1909 – judge of the United States District Court for the Eastern District of Illinois
- Harlington Wood Jr., B.A. 1942, J.D. 1948 – judge of the United States Court of Appeals for the Seventh Circuit
- Staci Michelle Yandle, B.S. 1983 – judge of the United States District Court for the Southern District of Illinois

==== Local offices ====
- Michael Cabonargi – commissioner of the Cook County Board of Review
- Johanna Contreras – acting executive of Ulster County, New York, 2022
- Bob Fioretti, B.A. in Political Science 1975 – Chicago alderman, 2007–2015
- M.J. Khan, Master's in Engineering – former member of the Houston City Council
- Dick Murphy, B.A. 1965 – mayor of San Diego (2000–2005)
- Eileen O'Neill Burke – Cook County state's attorney (2024–present)
- Thomas D. Westfall (1927–2005) – former mayor of El Paso, Texas

==== Activists ====
- Alida Bowler, 1911 – social worker and educator who advocated for Indigenous Americans in Nevada
- James Brady, 1962 – White House press secretary under Ronald Reagan, hand-gun-control advocate
- Dorothy Day, 1918 – founder of the Catholic Worker Movement
- Jesse Jackson – civil-rights leader; presidential candidate; founder of the Rainbow/PUSH Coalition
- Victor Kamber, B.S. 1965 – formed the Kamber Group, working for Democratic Party candidates and labor unions
- Vashti McCollum – political activist for the separation of religion and public education and the plaintiff of the McCollum case
- Carlos Montezuma (Wassaja), B.S. 1884 – Native American activist and a founding member of the Society of American Indians
- Atour Sargon, B.A. – Assyrian American activist, first ethnic Assyrian elected to the Lincolnwood board of trustees
- Albert Shanker – president of the United Federation of Teachers (1964–1984); president of the American Federation of Teachers (1974–1997)

==== International figures ====
- Berhane Abrehe, M.S. 1972 – third Minister of Finance of Eritrea
- Bambang Brodjonegoro, Prof., S.E., M.U.P., Ph.D. – 13th Minister of National Development Planning of Indonesia (2016-now) & 29th finance minister of Indonesia (27 October 2014 – 27 July 2016)
- Lin Chuan, Ph.D. – current premier of Taiwan and former Minister of Finance
- Rafael Correa, Ph.D. 2001 – president and former secretary (minister) of Finances of Ecuador
- Cüneyd Düzyol, M.S. 1996 – Turkish minister of development
- Atef Ebeid, Ph.D. 1962 – former prime minister of Egypt (1999–2004)
- Mustafa Khalil, M.S. 1948, Ph.D., 1951 – former prime minister of Egypt (1978–1980)
- Giorgi Kvirikashvili, M.S. 1998 – prime minister of Georgia
- Sixtus Lanner – Austrian member of Parliament
- Annette Lu, LL.M. 1971 – former vice-president of Taiwan (2000–2008)
- Oran McPherson – former speaker of the Legislative Assembly of Alberta; Minister of Public Works for the United Farmers of Alberta government
- Maxwell Mkwezalamba, Ph.D. 1995 – commissioner for Economic Affairs for the African Union Commission (since 2004)
- Rajai Muasher, M.Sc. 1966, Ph.D. 1971 – Jordan's deputy prime minister and minister of state for prime ministry affairs
- Sri Mulyani Indrawati, M.Sc., Ph.D. – 26th finance minister of Indonesia (2016–present) & managing director of the World Bank Group (2010–2016)
- Fidel V. Ramos M.S, 1951 – former president of the Philippines (1992–1998)
- Kandeh Yumkella, Ph.D. 1991 – director-general of the United Nations Industrial Development Organization

==== Other ====
- Louisan E. Mamer, B.A. 1931 – home economist of the Rural Electrification Administration
- Jill Wine-Banks, B.S. – Watergate prosecutor; general counsel of the Army (1977–1980); executive director of the American Bar Association

=== Science and mathematics ===
- MiMi Aung, BSEE 1988, MS 1990 – lead engineer on the Mars Helicopter Ingenuity
- Rudolf Bayer, Ph.D. 1966 – mathematician and computer scientist known for b-tree and red–black tree
- Ahmet Nihat Berker, Ph.D. 1977 – condensed matter physicist; president of Sabancı University, Istanbul
- David Blackwell, Ph.D. 1941 – mathematician; 2010 Rao–Blackwell theorem; first African-American to be inducted into the National Academy of Sciences (1965); first black tenured faculty member at the University of California, Berkeley
- Murray S. Blum – entomologist, authority on chemical ecology and pheromones
- Harold E. Brooks, Ph.D. 1990 – atmospheric scientist; tornado climatology expert
- John Carbon, B.S. 1952 – biochemist; National Academy of Sciences member
- Stephen S. Chang, Ph.D. 1952 – food scientist; recipient, IFT Stephen S. Chang Award for Lipid or Flavor Science
- Alfred Y. Cho, B.S. 1960, M.S. 1961, Ph.D. 1968 – father of molecular beam epitaxy; received the National Medal of Science in 1993
- Karl Clark, Ph.D. – discovered the hot water oil separation process
- Cutler J. Cleveland, Ph.D. – editor-in-chief of the Encyclopedia of Energy and the Encyclopedia of Earth
- Ronald Cohn, B.S. 1965, M.S. 1967, Ph.D. 1971 – researcher and cameraman who helped document Koko, the mountain gorilla
- Ronald Fuchs, M.S. 1955, PhD in 1957 – physicist
- Donald Geman, B.A. 1965 – applied mathematician, who discovered the Gibbs sampler method in computer vision, Random forests in machine learning, and the Top Scoring Pairs (TSP) classifier in bioinformatics; professor at Johns Hopkins University
- Josephine Burns Glasgow, A.B., 1909, master's degree, Ph.D. in mathematics, 1913 – second woman to receive a Ph.D. from Illinois University
- Gene H. Golub, B.S. 1953, M.A. 1954, Ph.D. 1959 – B. Bolzano Gold Medal for Merits in the Field of Mathematics
- T. R. Govindachari, post-doc 1946–49 – natural product chemist, Shanti Swarup Bhatnagar laureate
- Temple Grandin, Ph.D. 1989 – animal scientist; bestselling author; consultant to the livestock industry in animal behavior; her biopic (about her life as a woman diagnosed with autism at age two) won five Emmy Awards in 2010
- Paul Halmos, B.S. 1935, Ph.D. 1938 – mathematician
- Richard Hamming, Ph.D. 1942 – mathematician; developed Hamming code and Hamming distance; winner of 1968 ACM Turing Award; namesake of the IEEE's Richard W. Hamming Medal
- Leslie M. Hicks, Ph.D. 2005 – analytical chemist
- Donald G. Higman, Ph.D. 1952 – mathematician, discovered the Higman–Sims group
- Deborah M. Hinton, M.S. 1976, Ph.D. 1980, microbiologist, chief of the gene expression and regulation section in the laboratory of cell and molecular biology at the National Institute of Diabetes and Digestive and Kidney Diseases
- Donald Johanson, B.S. 1966 – anthropologist, discoverer of oldest known hominid, "Lucy"
- W. Dudley Johnson, B.S. 1951 – cardiac surgeon known as the father of coronary artery bypass surgery
- David A. Johnston, B.S. 1971 – USGS volcanologist killed in the 1980 eruption of Mount St. Helens
- Charles David Keeling, B.S. 1948 – chemist, alerted the world about the possible connection between climate change and human activity
- Michael Lacey, Ph.D. 1987 – awarded the Salem Prize for solving conjectures about the Bilinear Hilbert Transform
- Richard Leibler, Ph.D. 1939 – mathematician and cryptanalyst; formulated the Kullback–Leibler divergence, a measure of similarity between probability distributions; directed the Princeton center of the Institute for Defense Analysis
- Sandra Leiblum, Ph.D. – sexologist
- Stephanie A. Majewski, B.S. 2002; Ph.D. Stanford University 2007 – physicist
- Eloisa Biasotto Mano (1924–2019) – Brazilian chemist, professor
- Jeffrey S. Moore, Ph.D. 1989 – chemist
- Catherine J. Murphy, B.S. 1986 – chemist
- P. T. Narasimhan, Post-doc 1957–59 – theoretical chemist, Shanti Swarup Bhatnagar laureate
- Rahul Pandit, MS and PhD 1977–82 – condensed matter physicist, Shanti Swarup Bhatnagar laureate
- Francine Patterson, B.S. 1970 – researcher who taught a modified version of American Sign Language to a mountain gorilla named Koko
- Alessandro Piccolo – chemist and agricultural scientist Humboldt Prize in Chemistry 1999
- Mary Lynn Reed, Ph.D. 1995 – chief of Mathematics Research at the National Security Agency and president of the Crypto-Mathematics Institute
- Harold Reetz, Ph.D. crop physiology and ecology, agronomist and former president of the Foundation for Agronomic Research
- Idun Reiten, Ph.D. 1971 – professor of mathematics; considered one of Norway's greatest living mathematicians
- John A. Rogers – physical chemist and materials scientist
- Allan Sandage, B.S., 1948 – astronomer and cosmologist; winner of 1991 Crafoord Prize
- David G. Schaeffer, B.S. 1963 – mathematician
- Pierre Sokolsky, Ph.D. 1973 – astrophysicist, Panofsky Prize Laureate, directed the HiRES Cosmic Ray Detector project and pioneer in ultra-high-energy cosmic ray physics
- K. R. Sridhar, M.S. 1984, Ph.D. 1989 – founder of Bloom Energy
- Leia Stirling – American Association for the Advancement of Science Leshner Leadership Fellow and Massachusetts Institute of Technology Professor in Human–computer interaction
- Steven Takiff, Ph.D. 1970 – mathematician
- Charles W. Woodworth, B.S. 1885, M.S. 1886 – founder of the Division of Entomology, University of California, Berkeley; the PBESA gives the C. W. Woodworth Award
- Andrew Chi-Chih Yao, Ph.D. 1975 – computer scientist, winner of 2000 ACM Turing Award

=== Sports ===
==== Administration ====
- Ron Guenther, B.S. 1967, M.S. 1968 – Illinois Fighting Illini athletic director (1992–2011)
- Tony Khan, B.S. 2007 – president of All Elite Wrestling, senior vice president of Football Administration and Technology of Jacksonville Jaguars, vice chairman and director of Football Operations of Fulham F.C., son of Shahid Khan
- Doug Mills (1926–1930) – Illinois Fighting Illini athletic director (1941–1966), Illinois Fighting Illini men's basketball head coach (1936–1947)
- Jim Phillips, B.S. 1990 – Northern Illinois Huskies athletic director (2004–2008), Northwestern Wildcats athletic director (2008–2021), Atlantic Coast Conference commissioner (2021–present)
- Chester Pittser, B.S. 1924 – Miami University football and basketball coach (1924–1931), Montclair State College football, basketball and baseball coach (1934–1943)
- Josh Whitman, B.S. 2001, J.D. 2008 – Illinois Fighting Illini athletic director (2016–present), former NFL player

==== Baseball ====
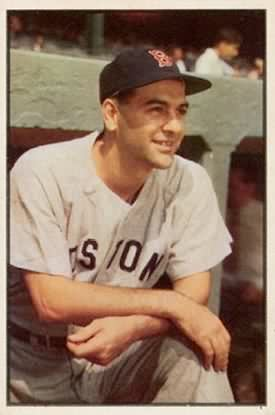
Lou Boudreau

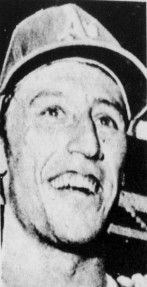
Ken Holtzman

- Jason Anderson – Major League Baseball player
- Dick Barrett – former Major League Baseball player, member of Pacific Coast League Hall of Fame
- Fred Beebe – late Major League Baseball player
- Lou Boudreau – late Major League Baseball player; member of the Baseball Hall of Fame
- Mark Dalesandro – former Major League Baseball catcher and third baseman
- Hoot Evers – former Major League Baseball outfielder (two-time All-Star)
- Darrin Fletcher – former Major League Baseball catcher
- Moe Franklin – Major League Baseball player
- Tom Haller – former Major League Baseball catcher
- Ken Holtzman – former Major League Baseball 2-time All-Star pitcher and Israel Baseball League manager
- Tanner Roark – Major League Baseball pitcher, Washington Nationals
- Marv Rotblatt – Major League Baseball pitcher, Chicago White Sox
- Scott Spiezio – has played for the St. Louis Cardinals, Oakland Athletics, Anaheim Angels, and Seattle Mariners
- Terry Wells – retired Major League Baseball pitcher

==== Basketball ====
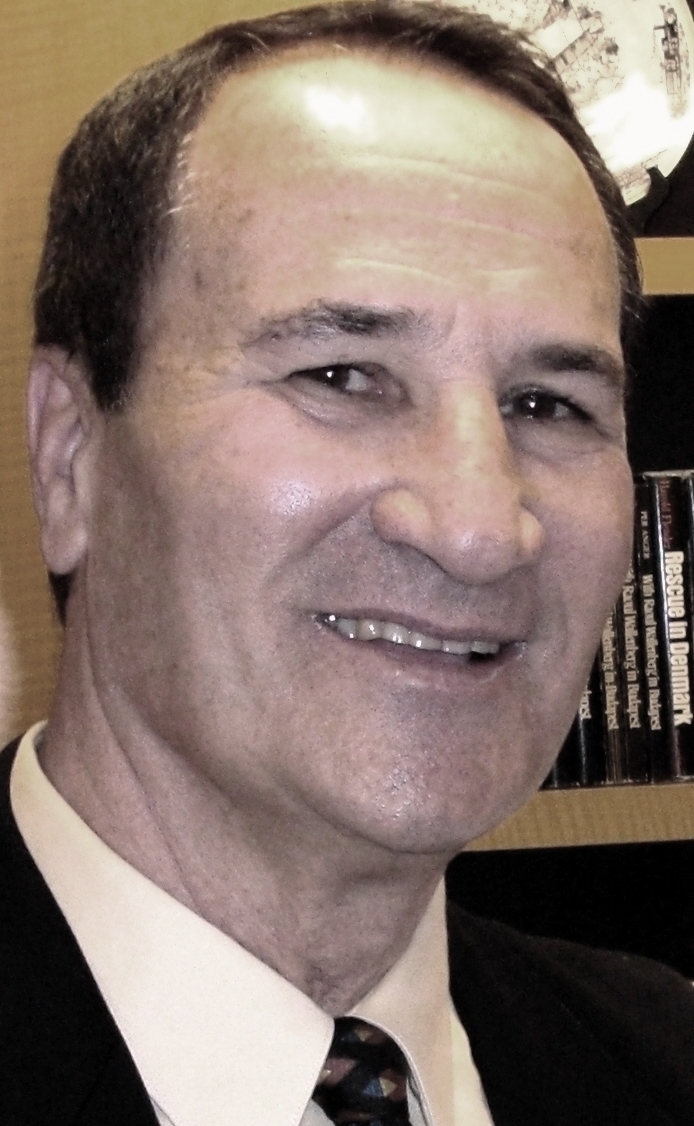
Tal Brody

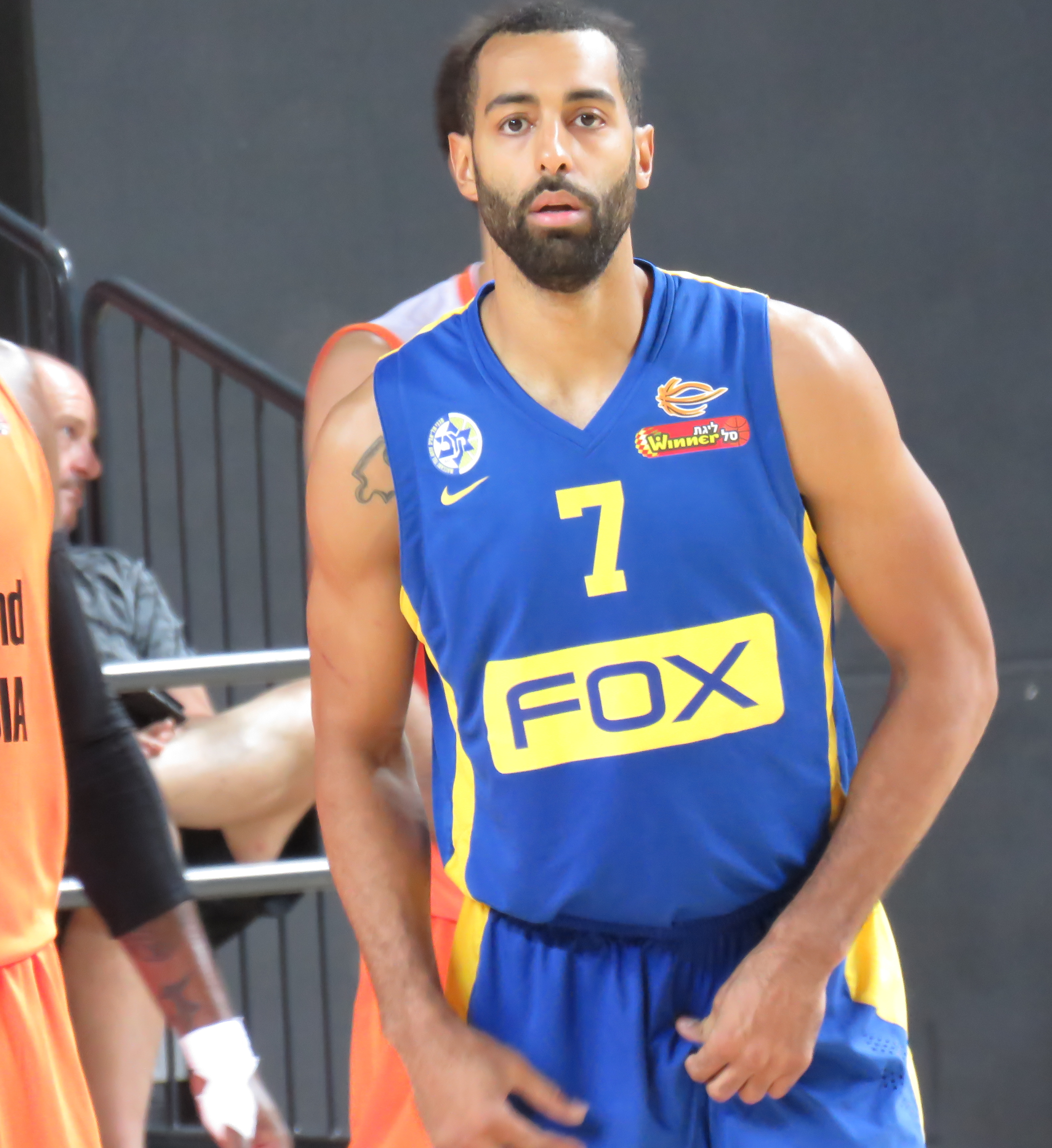
Brian Randle

- Nick Anderson (1987–1989) – played professionally for the NBA's Orlando Magic and Sacramento Kings
- James Augustine – basketball (2002–2006), played two seasons for the NBA's Orlando Magic, all-time leader in rebounds at Illinois
- Steve Bardo – former National Basketball Association player, current ESPN & Big Ten Network basketball analyst
- Kenny Battle – played in 4 NBA seasons for the Phoenix Suns, Denver Nuggets, Boston Celtics and Golden State Warriors
- Tal Brody – American-Israeli former Euroleague basketball player
- Dee Brown – former National Basketball Association player
- Chuck Carney (1918–1921) – first Big Ten athlete to be named a football and basketball All-American, Helms Foundation College Basketball Player of the Year (1922), twice named a Helms Foundation All-American for basketball (1920 & 1922)
- Jerry Colangelo (1958–1962) – former owner of the NBA's Phoenix Suns, the WNBA's Phoenix Mercury, the CISL's Arizona Sandsharks, the Arena Football League's Arizona Rattlers and MLB's Arizona Diamondbacks
- Brian Cook (1999–2003) – fifth all-time scorer for the Illini, played professionally in NBA
- Ayo Dosunmu – professional basketball player for the National Basketball Association's Chicago Bulls
- Nnanna Egwu – professional basketball player for the National Basketball League of Australia and New Zealand
- Kendall Gill (1986–1990) – 1990 consensus All-American and Big 10 Player of the Year, played professionally for 15 seasons in the NBA
- Lowell Hamilton (1985–1989) – played professional basketball in Greece
- Derek Harper (1980–1983) – played professionally for 16 seasons in the NBA, ranked 11th all-time in steals and 17th in assists
- Luther Head (2001–2005) – guard for the Sacramento Kings
- Malcolm Hill (2013–2017) – professional basketball player for the Star Hotshots of the Philippine Basketball Association
- Eddie Johnson – played professionally for 17 seasons in the NBA, and the league's 35th all-time leading scorer
- Johnny "Red" Kerr – member of the 1952 Final Four team; played professionally for 11 seasons in the NBA; first head coach for both the Chicago Bulls and Phoenix Suns; former broadcaster for Chicago Bulls
- Meyers Leonard (2010–2012) – center for the Portland Trail Blazers, eleventh overall pick in 2012 NBA draft
- Demetri McCamey – Turkish Basketball League player
- Ken Norman (1984–1987) – played professionally for 10 seasons in the NBA
- Don Ohl – basketball (1954–1958), played 10 seasons (1960–1970) in the NBA for three teams (Detroit Pistons, Baltimore Bullets, St. Louis/Atlanta Hawks), 5xNBA All-Star
- Johnny Orr – basketball (1944–45), Named the National Coach of the Year for the 1976 season and Big Ten Coach of the Year in college basketball while coaching at Michigan
- Stan Patrick – former National Basketball Association player
- Andy Phillip – basketball (1941–1943, 1946–1947), member of the "Whiz Kids", played 11 seasons of professional basketball for the Chicago Stags, Philadelphia Warriors, Fort Wayne Pistons and Boston Celtics (1947–1958), Head Coach of the St. Louis Hawks (1958–1959), 5xNBA All-Star, 2x Consensus All-American
- Roger Powell – former National Basketball Association player
- Brian Randle (born 1985) – basketball player for Maccabi Tel Aviv of the Israeli Basketball Super League
- Jennifer Ruddell (born 1978) – wheelchair basketball player
- Dave Scholz – former National Basketball Association player
- Cindy Stein – basketball, head women's basketball coach at the University of Missouri since 1998
- Jaylon Tate – professional basketball player in the National Basketball League of Canada
- Deon Thomas – American-Israeli former Euroleague basketball player
- Deron Williams – National Basketball Association player
- Frank Williams – has been part of the NBA's New York Knicks, Denver Nuggets, Chicago Bulls, and Los Angeles Clippers
- Ray Woods – basketball (1913–1917), Names Helms Foundation College Basketball Player of the Year (1917), 3x Helms Foundation All-American (1915–1917), 3x First Team All-Big Ten

==== Football ====
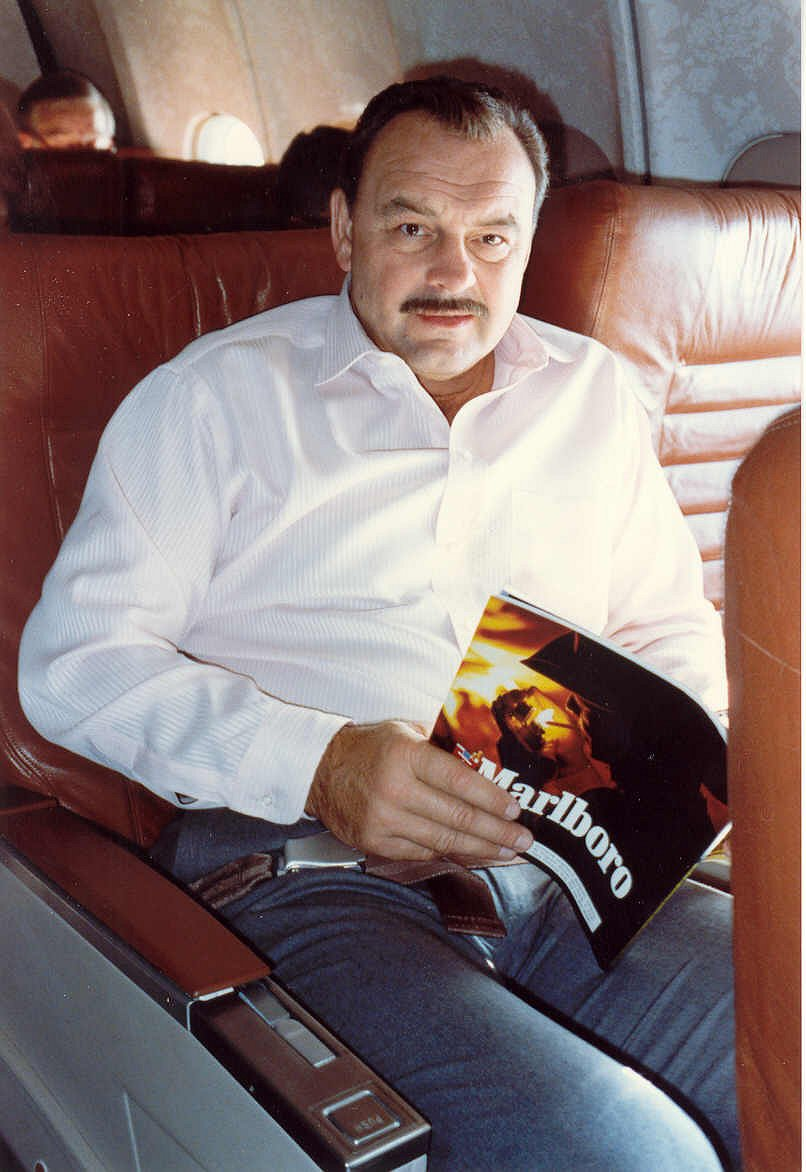
Dick Butkus

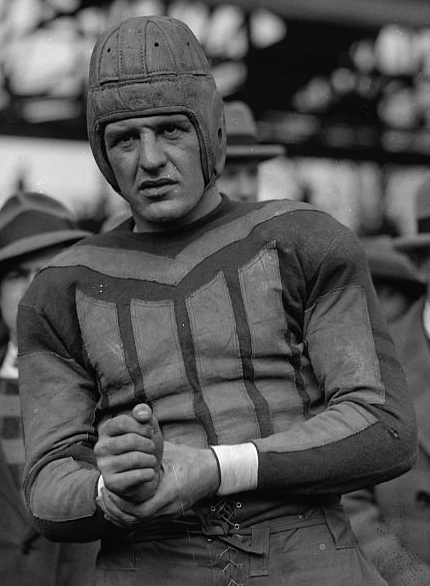
Red Grange

- Paul Adams – former Deerfield High School coach
- Alex Agase – former National Football League player, Cleveland Browns, Member of the College Football Hall of Fame
- Ron Acks – former National Football League player, linebacker for the Atlanta Falcons
- Jeff Allen – football (2008–2011), offensive tackle for the Kansas City Chiefs
- Alan Ball – National Football League player, cornerback for the Jacksonville Jaguars
- Arrelious Benn – National Football League player, wide receiver for the Tampa Bay Buccaneers
- Chuck Boerio – National Football League player, linebacker for the Green Bay Packers
- Ed Brady – former National Football League player, linebacker for the Cincinnati Bengals
- Josh Brent – National Football League player, defensive tackles for the Dallas Cowboys
- Bill Brown – former National Football League player, running back for the Minnesota Vikings
- Darrick Brownlow – former National Football League player, linebacker for the Dallas Cowboys
- Lloyd Burdick – National Football League tackle
- Dick Butkus – National Football League linebacker; member of the Pro Football Hall of Fame
- Luke Butkus – National Football League coach, offensive line coach for the Chicago Bears, nephew of Dick Butkus
- J. C. Caroline – former National Football League player, defensive back and halfback for the Chicago Bears
- Danny Clark IV – National Football League player, linebacker for the New Orleans Saints
- Steve Collier – National Football League player, offensive tackle for the Green Bay Packers
- Jameel Cook – former National Football League player, fullback for the Tampa Bay Buccaneers
- Vontae Davis – National Football League player, cornerback for the Indianapolis Colts
- Mark Dennis – former National Football League player, offensive tackle for the Miami Dolphins
- David Diehl – National Football League player, offensive guard for the New York Giants
- Doug Dieken – former National Football League player, offensive tackle for the Cleveland Browns
- Ken Dilger (1991–1994) – played professionally for the Indianapolis Colts and Tampa Bay Buccaneers; starting tight end in Super Bowl XXXVII
- Charles Carroll "Tony" Eason (1979–1983) – played professionally for the New England Patriots; led team to Super Bowl XX
- Moe Gardner – former National Football League player, former defensive line for the Atlanta Falcons
- Jeff George – first overall pick of 1990 NFL draft by the Indianapolis Colts, also played for a variety of teams including the Atlanta Falcons, Oakland Raiders, and the Washington Redskins
- Lou Gordon – former National Football League player, defensive end for the Chicago Cardinals
- Red Grange – charter member of the Pro Football Hall of Fame
- Howard Griffith – former National Football League player, fullback for the Denver Broncos
- George Halas – former National Football League coach for the Chicago Bears; charter member of the Pro Football Hall of Fame
- Don Hansen – former National Football League player, linebacker for the Atlanta Falcons
- Kevin Hardy – played professionally for the NFL's Jacksonville Jaguars, Dallas Cowboys, and Cincinnati Bengals
- Kelvin Hayden – National Football League player, cornerback for the Chicago Bears
- John Holecek – 1990–1994, NFL (1995–2022) with the Bills, Chargers & Falcons; head coach of Loyola Academy, 2006–2022, 185-26 record, 3 state titles
- Brad Hopkins – first round pick in the 1993 NFL draft by the Tennessee Titans; all-pro
- Michael Hoomanawanui (2007–2009) – tight end for the New England Patriots
- A.J. Jenkins (2008–2011) – wide receiver for the Kansas City Chiefs, thirtieth overall pick in 2012 NFL draft
- Henry Jones – former National Football League player, safety for the Buffalo Bills
- Brandon Jordan – Canadian Football League player, defensive tackle for the BC Lions
- William G. Kline – head coach of the University of Florida and Nebraska Cornhuskers football and basketball teams
- Mikel Leshoure – National Football League player, running back for the Detroit Lions
- Greg Lewis – National Football League player, wide receiver for the Philadelphia Eagles
- Brandon Lloyd (1999–2002) – wide receiver for the San Francisco 49ers, 2010 Pro Bowler and 2010 NFL receiving yards leader
- Corey Liuget (2008–2010) – defensive end for the San Diego Chargers, eighteenth overall pick in 2011 NFL draft
- Rashard Mendenhall – National Football League player, running back for the Arizona Cardinals and Pittsburgh Steelers
- Whitney Mercilus (2009–2011) – linebacker for the Houston Texans, twenty-sixth overall pick in the 2012 NFL draft
- Brandon Moore – former National Football League player, former offensive guard for the New York Jets
- Aaron Moorehead – National Football League player, wide receiver for the Indianapolis Colts
- Ray Nitschke – played professionally for the NFL's Green Bay Packers, and an enshrined member of the Pro Football Hall of Fame
- Tony Pashos – National Football League player, offensive tackle for the Baltimore Ravens
- Preston Pearson (1963–1967) – played 13 seasons in the NFL for the Colts, Steelers and Cowboys despite not playing college football
- Frosty Peters – former National Football League player
- Neil Rackers – National Football League player, kicker for the Houston Texans
- Simeon Rice – former National Football League player, defensive end
- Scott Studwell – football (1972–1976), played 14 seasons (1977–1990) for the Minnesota Vikings, 2-time Pro-Bowler
- Marques Sullivan – Playboy All-American Tackle, played 4 seasons with NFL's Buffalo Bills, New York Giants, and New England Patriots
- Pierre Thomas – National Football League player, running back for the New Orleans Saints
- Bruce Thornton – former National Football League player, defensive tackle for the Dallas Cowboys
- Fred Wakefield – National Football League player, offensive guard for the Arizona Cardinals
- Steve Weatherford – National Football League player, punter for the New York Giants
- Isiah John "Juice" Williams – football (2006–2009), NFL free agent
- Eugene Wilson – National Football League player, defensive back for the New England Patriots

==== Golf ====
- Bob Goalby – professional golfer; won 1968 Masters Tournament
- Thomas Pieters (2010–2013) – PGA golfer (2013–present)
- D. A. Points – golf, PGA golfer (1999–present)
- Steve Stricker (1986–1990) – PGA golfer (1990–present)

==== Tennis ====
- Kevin Anderson – finalist at Wimbledon and U. S. Open
- Amer Delic – N.C.A.A. singles champion
- Rajeev Ram – 3 Grand Slam men's doubles and 2 Grand Slam mixed doubles titles

==== Wrestling ====
- Jesse Delgado – wrestler, three-time All-American, two-time National Champion at 125 lbs
- Lindsey Durlacher – two-time All-American Greco-Roman wrestler
- Mark Jayne – wrestler; two-time NWCA All-Star Member
- Jeff Monson – wrestler; two-time gold medalist ('99 and '05) ADCC Submission Wrestling World Championships, current mixed martial artist, formerly for the Ultimate Fighting Championship
- David Otunga – professional wrestler; two-time WWE Tag Team Champion

==== Olympics ====
- Kevin Anderson – Olympian in men's tennis 2008 Summer Olympics in Beijing
- Michelle Bartsch-Hackley – gold medalist in women's volleyball 2020 (2021) Summer Olympics in Tokyo
- Avery Brundage, B.S. 1909 – Olympian, International Olympic Committee (IOC) president (1952–1972)
- Dike Eddleman (1947–1949) – also tied for 2nd at the 1948 Summer Olympics in the high jump
- Abie Grossfeld – Olympic, Pan Am, and Maccabiah Games gymnast and coach
- George Kerr (1958–1960) – all-time Big Ten Olympian list, champion sprinter and 400/800 meter runner from Jamaica, 1960 Rome, Italy Summer Olympic bronze medal 800 meter winner
- Don Laz – track & field, record-setting pole vaulter; silver medalist at the 1952 Olympic Games in Helsinki, Finland
- Daniel Kinsey – gold medalist in men's 110 m hurdles, 1924 Summer Olympics in Paris
- Jonathan Kuck – silver medalist in speed skating in the 2010 Winter Olympics in Vancouver
- Tatyana McFadden – USA paralympian athlete competing mainly in category T54 sprint events, team member for the 2012 London Olympics
- Herb McKenley – silver medalist in 400 m, 1948 Summer Olympics in London; silver medal in 100 m and 400 m, gold medal in 4 × 400 m relay, 1952 Summer Olympics in Helsinki
- Harold Osborn – won two gold medals in the 1924 Summer Olympics, charter member of U.S. Track & Field Hall of Fame
- Jordyn Poulter – gold medalist in women's volleyball 2020 (2021) Summer Olympics in Tokyo
- Bob Richards – gold medalist in pole vault in the 1952 Helsinki and 1956 Melbourne Games
- Ashley Spencer – bronze medalist in 2016 Rio de Janeiro Olympics, 400 meter hurdles; 2013 world champion, 4-x-400 relay
- Justin Spring (2002–2006) – member of the bronze medal-winning men's gymnastics team at the 2008 Summer Olympics
- Craig Virgin – long-distance runner, 1975 NCAA cross country champion, 1980 and 1981 world cross-country champion
- Deron Williams – USA basketball team member for the 2012 London Olympics

==== Soccer ====
- Hope Breslin – first player drafted by Angel City FC, professional soccer player for Brooklyn FC
- Vanessa DiBernardo – first player in program history to be drafted in the NWSL, made over 150 appearances with the Chicago Red Stars, current player with Kansas City Current

==== Other ====
- Billy Arnold – race driver and winner of the 1930 Indianapolis 500 mile race
- Perdita Felicien – first woman in Illinois history to win a gold medal in an individual event at the World Championships
- Belal Muhammad (Law) – UFC, welterweight champion, mixed martial arts
- Frank Vecera – paralympic athlete, snooker and wheelchair basketball player

=== Miscellaneous ===
- Shay Craig, Episcopal bishop
- Fred Goetz, aka "Shotgun" George Ziegler – Prohibition-era gunman and associate of mobsters Gus Winkler and Fred Burke
- Steven Kazmierczak – perpetrator of the 2008 Northern Illinois University shooting

=== Fictional ===
- Lt. Col. Henry Blake, portrayed by McLean Stevenson on M*A*S*H
- Cam Tucker, portrayed by Eric Stonestreet on Modern Family

== Notable faculty ==
=== Nobel laureates ===
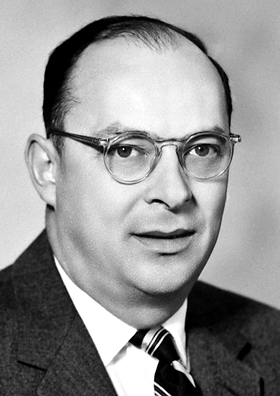
John Bardeen

- John Bardeen, 1951–1991 – awarded Nobel Prizes for Physics in 1953 for co-inventing the transistor and again in 1972 for work on superconductivity (one of the four people in the world to win multiple Nobel Prizes and the only one who won twice in Physics)
- Elias James (E.J.) Corey, 1951–1959 – Nobel laureate (Chemistry, 1990)
- Leonid Hurwicz, 1950–1951, 2001 – Nobel laureate (Economics, 2007)
- Paul Lauterbur, 1985–2007 – Nobel laureate (Physiology or Medicine, 2003)
- Anthony James Leggett, 1983 – Nobel laureate (Physics, 2003)
- Salvador Luria, 1950–1959 – Nobel laureate (Physiology or Medicine, 1969)
- Rudolph Marcus, 1964–1968 – Nobel laureate (Chemistry, 1992)
- Franco Modigliani, 1948–1952 – Nobel laureate (Economics, 1985)
- Alvin E. Roth, 1974–1982 – Nobel laureate (Economics, 2012 )

=== Pulitzer Prize winners ===
- Leon Dash, faculty – Explanatory Journalism, 1995
- Bill Gaines, faculty – Investigative Reporting, 1976 and 1988
- Richard Powers, faculty – Fiction, 2019

=== Other ===
- Elmer H. Antonsen, Ph.D. 1961, faculty 1967–1996 – chair of the Department of Germanic Languages and Literatures, later chair of the Department of Linguistics
- William Bagley, faculty 1908–1917 – an original proponent of educational essentialism
- Tamer Başar – Swanlund Endowed Chair & CAS Professor of Department of Electrical and Computer Engineering; winner of Richard E. Bellman Control Heritage Award in 2006
- Gordon Baym – professor emeritus in physics, theoretician in a wide range of fields including condensed matter physics, nuclear physics, and astrophysics
- Nina Baym – professor of English 1963–2004, literary critic and literary historian
- Rakesh M. Bhatt, MA 1987, PHD 1994 – linguist
- Richard Blahut – former chair of the Electrical and Computer Engineering Department at the University of Illinois Urbana-Champaign, best known for his Blahut–Arimoto algorithm used in rate–distortion theory; winner of IEEE Claude E. Shannon Award in 2005 and the recipient of IEEE Third Millennium Medal
- Leonard Bloomfield, faculty 1910–1921 – linguist who led the development of structural linguistics
- Eleanor Blum – professor emerita of Library Science at the University of Illinois Urbana-Champaign
- Jean Bourgain, faculty – Fields Medal in Mathematics of International Mathematical Union, 1994
- Zong-qi Cai – leads the Forum on Chinese Poetic Culture
- Ira Carmen, 1968–2009 – first political scientist elected to the Human Genome Organization; co-founder of the social science subdiscipline of genetics and politics
- Wallace Hume Carothers – organic chemist, inventor of nylon and first synthetic rubber (Neoprene)
- Weng Cho Chew – professor of electrical and computer engineering, member of National Academy of Engineering
- Ron Dewar – music educator, jazz saxophonist, leader of influential Memphis Nighthawks
- Anne Haas Dyson – professor in Curriculum and Instruction
- Jan Erkert – chair of the Department of Dance; Fulbright scholar
- Joseph L. Doob, faculty 1935–1978 – developed a theory of mathematical martingales
- Donald B. Gillies, 1928–1975 – professor of mathematics, pioneer in computer science and game theory
- Nelly Sfeir Gonzalez, 1930-2020 - professor of library science, bibiliographer, journal editor
- Heini Halberstam, 1980–1996 – professor of mathematics, known for the Elliott–Halberstam conjecture Elliott–Halberstam conjecture
- David Gottlieb, 1946–1982 – discovered chloramphenicol; Guggenheim Fellow, Biology-Plant Science, 1963
- Donald J. Harris, 1966–1967 – asst. professor of economics, later prof. of economics at Stanford University; father of Vice President Kamala D. Harris
- William Walter Hay – 1956–1977 professor of railway engineering remembered with the American Railway Engineering and Maintenance-of-Way Association Hay Award
- Lejaren Hiller, faculty 1952–1968 – chemist and composer; invented process for dyeing Orlon; pioneer in music composition by computer (1950s)
- Walter Höllerer, faculty 1973–1996 – modern German literature professor, novelist, poet
- Nick Holonyak, Jr. – Lemelson-MIT Prize (2004), National Medal of Technology (2002), National Medal of Science (1990); credited for the invention of the LED and the first semiconductor laser to operate in the visible spectrum
- Sri Mulyani Indrawati, M.A., Ph.D. 1992 – managing director of the World Bank Group (since 2010), former finance minister of Indonesia (2005–2010)
- Anthony Jacobi – mechanical science and engineering professor
- Ivan R. King, 1956–1954 – professor of astronomy
- Keith W. Kelley, 1976-2011- professor Emeritus of Immunophysiology.
- Donald William Kerst, 1938–1957 – developed the betatron
- Petar V. Kokotovic – winner of Richard E. Bellman Control Heritage Award in 2002
- Frederick Wilfrid Lancaster – Library and Information Science Professor 1972–1992; promoted to professor emeritus (a position he held until 2013) of Library and Information Science
- Jean-Pierre Leburton – Gregory E. Stillman Professor of Electrical and Computer Engineering and professor of Physics
- Stephen E. Levinson – professor of Electrical and Computer Engineering
- Stephen P. Long – environmental plant physiologist, Fellow of the Royal Society and member of the National Academy of Sciences studying how to improve photosynthesis to increase the yield of food and biofuel crops
- Francis Wheeler Loomis, head of Physics Department 1929–1957 – former Guggenheim Fellow; established school's physics department
- Catherine J. Murphy – professor of chemistry
- Lisa Nakamura – director of the Asian American Studies Program; author of Digitizing Race: Visual Cultures of the Internet (2008), Cybertypes: Race, Ethnicity and Identity on the Internet (2002)
- Marie Hochmuth Nichols, faculty 1939–1976 – influential rhetorical critic
- Mangalore Anantha Pai – power engineer, Shanti Swarup Bhatnagar laureate
- Don Patinkin (1922–1995) – Israeli-American economist, and president of the Hebrew University of Jerusalem
- Herbert Penzl, faculty 1938–1950 – Austrian-American linguist specialized in Germanic philology
- Ernst Alfred Philippson, faculty 1947–1968 – German philologist, longtime editor of the Journal of English and Germanic Philology
- Catherine Prendergast – scholar of English and intellectual history, 2004 Guggenheim Fellowship recipient
- Irmengard Rauch, faculty 1968–82 – scholar of Germanic linguistics
- Abram L. Sachar, 1923–1948 – founding president of Brandeis University
- Theodore Sougiannis – distinguished professor of accountancy
- Timothy D. Stark, since 1991 – professor of Geotechnical Engineering in the Department of Civil and Environmental Engineering
- Dora Dougherty Strother, 1949–1950 – aviation instructor, test pilot, Women Airforce Service Pilot, one of the first women to pilot a B-29 bomber
- Fred W. Tanner, 1923–1956 – food microbiologist; charter member of the Institute of Food Technologists; founder of scientific journal Food Research (now the Journal of Food Science)
- Alexandre Tombini – governor of the Central Bank of Brazil
- Brian Wansink, 1997–2005 – Julian Simon professor and author of Mindless Eating: Why We Eat More Than We Think
- William Warfield, 1976–1990 – bass-baritone singer; chair of the Division of Voice in the College of Music
- Carl Woese – Crafoord Prize recipient (bioscience, 2003); professor of microbiology; foreign member of the Royal Society; defined the Archaea
- Charles Zeleny – zoologist
- Ladislav Zgusta, faculty 1971–1995 – chair of the Department of Linguistics; director of the Center for Advanced Study; historical linguist and lexicographer from Czechoslovakia

== See also ==
- List of people from Illinois
- Pinto Bean, a piebald squirrel who lived on the campus
