= William Stanley =

William Stanley or Bill Stanley may refer to:

== Politicians and noblemen ==
- William Stanley, 3rd Baron Monteagle (1528–1581), English politician, MP for Lancashire
- William Stanley, 6th Earl of Derby (1561–1642), English politician
- William Stanley, 9th Earl of Derby (c. 1655 – 1702), English politician
- William Stanley (MP for Southampton) (1610–1678), English merchant and politician
- William Stanley (1640–1670), English politician, MP for Liverpool
- William Owen Stanley (1802–1884), British MP and lord lieutenant of Anglesey
- William Eugene Stanley (1844–1910), American politician, Governor of Kansas
- William Stillman Stanley Jr. (1838–?), Wisconsin jeweler and legislator
- Bill Stanley (politician) (William M. Stanley Jr., born 1967), American politician

== Military figures ==
- William Stanley (soldier) (died 1495), English leader in the Wars of the Roses
- William Stanley (born 1548), English officer under Elizabeth I
- William A. Stanley (1831–?), American Civil War sailor and Medal of Honor recipient

== Other people ==
- William Stanley (composer) (1820–1902), English-born Australian classical music composer
- William Stanley (inventor) (1829–1909), British architect and inventor
- William Stanley (priest) (1647–1731), English churchman and college head
- William Stanley (Hawaii judge) (1872–1939), Irish lawyer and judge of the Republic of Hawaii
- William Stanley (football manager), British footballer and first manager of Coventry City F.C.
- William O. Stanley (William Oliver Stanley, Jr., fl. 1930s), American professor
- William Stanley Jr. (1858–1916), American physicist
- Bill Stanley (American football) (fl. 1924)
- Bill Stanley (mammalogist) (William T. Stanley, c. 1957–2015)
- Bill Stanley (javelin thrower) (born 1994), American javelin thrower, 2013 All-American for the Ohio State Buckeyes track and field team
- William Stanley Hoole (1903–1990), pen name Will Stanley, American librarian, historian, writer, and professor
