= Jessica Greenberg =

American Anthropologist

Jessica Greenberg is a social anthropologist who is an associate professor of Anthropology and Jewish Culture, and Russian, East European, and Eurasian Studies, at the University of Illinois at Urbana–Champaign. As a political anthropologist, Greenberg's research has focused on questions of democracy, post-socialism, protest, citizenship, state, and revolution as well as her regional interests in Eastern Europe, the Former Yugoslavia (Serbia specifically) and Europe.

== Early education and college ==
Beginning in her teen years, Greenberg became active in a variety of issues through clubs and volunteer projects, such as volunteering at a local aquarium in high school, was a member of an environmental club, fenced, and enjoyed writing poetry. After high school, Greenberg attended Columbia University. She became interested in anthropology as an undergraduate and began as a women's and gender studies major, with a concentration in anthropology. She joined the feminist movement on campus, the literary review, and the Reform Jewish community. In her senior year she worked for the World Federalist Association, a non-governmental organization that collaborates with the United Nations among other organizations to work towards achieving and maintaining peace. She also participated in the Network of East West Women in New York City, a communication network dedicated to aiding the formation of independent women's movements.

The summer after her junior year in college, Greenberg spent six weeks as a volunteer at the Volunteer Project Pakrac in Croatia, which was intended to rebuild infrastructure and social ties in Western Slavonia, which sparked her interest in the former Yugoslavia. Upon completing her volunteering and returning to college, she volunteered for different non-governmental organization, one of which focused on gender and advocacy in the former Yugoslavia.

She pursued a career in anthropology because it combined her interests in scholarly work and in living and working abroad. She received her Doctorate in Anthropology from the University of Chicago in 2007.

== Awards ==
Greenberg has been awarded a Mellon Foundation Fellowship in the Humanities, the Fulbright-Hays Dissertation research fellowship, and awards from the International Research & Exchanges Board and the American Council of Learned Societies.

== Career and work ==
Greenberg taught at Northwestern University in the Department of Communication Studies for four years as an assistant professor. She now teaches at the University of Illinois at Urbana-Champaign in the Department of Anthropology.

== Research ==
Greenberg's dissertation, Citizen Youth: Student Organizations and the Making of Democracy in Post-socialist Serbia, drew on Greenberg's research, as well as her experience in formerly socialist Eastern Europe, where she had been traveling to since 1966. The falling of the Berlin Wall occurred when she was 14, and this left a lasting impression on her. She began questioning what existed "behind the wall" and became curious about what the aftermath of this event would be. She takes special interest in the area's democratic political transformations and student movements such as Otpor! – A Serbian student resistance movement, and wrote a book entitled After the Revolution: Youth, Democracy and the Politics of Disappointment in Post-socialist Serbia.

== Selected works ==
- (2011) On the Road to Normal: Negotiating Agency and State Sovereignty in Post-socialist Serbia
- (2012) Gaming the System: Semiotic Indeterminacy and Political Circulation in the New Age of Revolution
- (2014) After the Revolution: Youth, Democracy and the Politics of Disappointment in Serbia
