= Anthony Jacobi =

American scientist and engineer

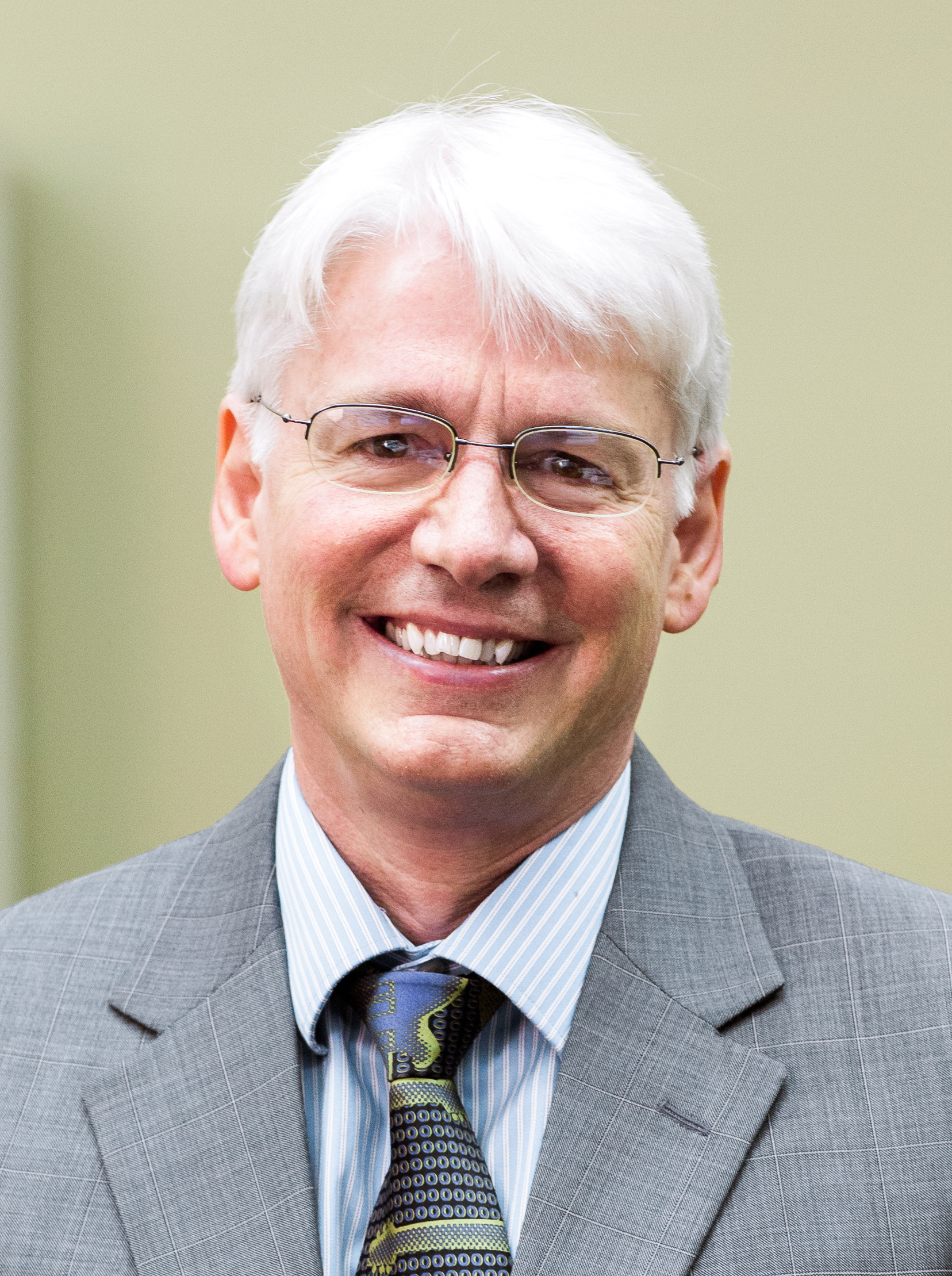
- Anthony Jacobi in 2015
- Born: 1960 (age 65–66)
- Title: Richard W. Kritzer Distinguished Professor

Academic background
- Education: Purdue University
- Doctoral advisor: Victor Goldschmidt
- Website: https://mechse.illinois.edu/people/profile/a-jacobi

Anthony Jacobi is an American engineer who is the Richard W. Kritzer Distinguished Professor at the University of Illinois. Jacobi is an Elected Fellow of the American Society of Mechanical Engineers and American Society of Heating, Refrigerating and Air-Conditioning Engineers.

== Early life ==
Jacobi was born in Louisville, Kentucky in the United States to Judy (née Shea; January 26, 1939 - July 2, 2021) and Kenneth Jacobi (December 26, 1939 - ). He grew up in southern Indiana and east-central Kentucky where his family farmed tobacco.

== Career ==
Anthony Jacobi completed a PhD at Purdue University in 1989, where he was advised by Victor Goldschmidt. He was assistant professor at the Johns Hopkins University from 1989 to 1992, before moving to the University of Illinois Urbana-Champaign. He became Professor in 2001, and was named the Richard W. Kritzer Distinguished Professor in 2004. From 1997 to 2015, he was Associate Director then Co-director of the Air Conditioning and Refrigeration Center, an industry-university cooperative research center, founded by the U.S. National Science Foundation. Anthony Jacobi became the 21st Head of Mechanical Science and Engineering at the University of Illinois in 2015.

After serving as Head for eleven years, Professor Jacobi returned to full-time teaching and research in August, 2026.
