= Ronald F. Silva =

Retired United States Coast Guard admiral

Ronald F. Silva is a retired Rear Admiral in the United States Coast Guard.

== Career ==
Early in his military service, Ronald F. Silva was stationed aboard the USCGC Escanaba (WHEC-64), the USCGC Mendota (WHEC-69) and the USCGC Sherman (WHEC-720). He would eventually become the Chief Engineer at Coast Guard Headquarters and Commander of the Ninth Coast Guard District.

Silva retired from the military in 2004. Decorations he received during his career included the Coast Guard Distinguished Service Medal, the Legion of Merit, the Meritorious Service Medal, the Coast Guard Commendation Medal and the Coast Guard Achievement Medal.

== Education ==
- United States Coast Guard Academy
- University of Illinois Urbana-Champaign
- George Washington University
