= Anne Haas Dyson =

American professor

Academic background
- Education: University of Texas at Austin College of Education

Academic work
- Discipline: Literacy; Pedagogy
- Institutions: University of Illinois

Anne Haas Dyson is a professor at the University of Illinois. Her fields are the study of literacy, pedagogy, and contemporary, diverse childhoods. Using qualitative and sociolinguistic research procedures, Dyson examines the use of written language from children's perspectives within their social worlds, and as they engage with popular culture. Books she has published include The Brothers and Sisters Learn to Write, Popular Literacies in Childhood and School Cultures (2003), Writing Superheroes, Contemporary Childhood, Popular Culture, and Classroom Literacy (1997), Social Worlds of Children Learning to Write in an Urban Primary School (1993), Multiple Worlds of Child Writers: Friends Learning to Write (1989). Dyson has also written articles for professional journals.

== Education ==
Dyson received a Bachelor of Science degree (concentration: English) at the University of Wisconsin–Madison in 1972. Following this, she obtained a M.Ed., in Curriculum and Instruction (1976) and a Ph.D. in Education (1981) at the University of Texas, Austin.

== Statement of Teaching Philosophy ==
Throughout Dyson's career, Dyson has strived to engage students with their own interests, while helping them develop common skills. In Dyson's words: “As a teacher and a researcher, I think intellectual, political, and moral issues of teaching and learning are best understood—and grappled with—when they are embodied in everyday human experiences of teachers and students, in and out of school; conversely, I think teachers immersed in the very human context of classroom life (which is not neat, not orderly, and not predictable) must also see the larger issues implicit in their daily decisions.”

Continuing, Dyson states, “Finally, my identities as a teacher of the young and not-so-young merge in the kind of engagement I require of my students. Having struggled to help a 6-year-old realize that fish starts with F, not God or water, I do not equate lecturing with teaching. There is nothing lonelier than standing in front of a class when I’m not sure they are, intellectually, with me—and nothing is more satisfying than when we are all making progress together. Then teaching is its own reward.”

Additionally, Dyson stresses the importance of unstructured playtime in preschool and kindergarten as a “fundamental avenue” for learning. Attempts by parents and educators to bombard children with information to give children's cognitive abilities an early boost may be well-intentioned, but is ultimately counterproductive. According to Dyson (2009), “That approach doesn’t appreciate the role of play and imagination in a child’s intellectual development. Play is where children discover ideas, experiences and concepts and think about them and their consequences. This is where literacy and learning really begins.” Although Dyson sees some value in teaching the ABCs to children in pre-kindergarten, she believes that attempting to accelerate learning actually works against a child's development. According to Dyson, kindergarten and preschool should be a place for children to experience play as intellectual inquiry, before they become taken over by the tyranny of high-stakes testing. She states, “I’m certainly not opposed to literacy in the early grades, but the idea that we can eliminate play from the curriculum doesn’t make sense. Kids don’t respond well to sitting still in their desks and listening at that age. They need stimulation. We have to intellectually engage kids. We have to give them a sense of their own agency, their own capacity, and an ability to ask questions and solve problems. So we have to give them more open-ended activities that allow them the space they need to make sense of things.”

== Career ==
Beginning in the early seventies, Dyson began teaching and has taught all of her adult life. She began by teaching Mexican American children in a poor Catholic diocese in El Paso, then taught adults in an English Academy, migrant preschoolers, and bilingual first graders in public schools. Presently, Dyson teaches adults, but her teaching sensibilities and goals are deeply rooted in her identify as a teacher of the young.

Dyson began her career in higher education at the University of Georgia, where she was an assistant professor (1981–1985) in the Department of Language Education and belonged to the Graduate Faculty, Graduate School (1984–1985). She began at the University of California, Berkeley in the Division of Language, Literacy and Culture as a visiting assistant professor (1984–1985), then an assistant professor (1985–1987), an associate professor (1987–1991), and became a professor (1991–2002). Dyson then became a professor in the Department of Teacher Education at Michigan State University (2002–2006). Most currently, Dyson is a professor in Curriculum and Instruction at the University of Illinois at Urbana-Champaign (2006–present).

== Awards and honors ==
=== Research Awards and Honors ===
Dyson received the David H. Russell Award for Distinguished Research in the Teaching of English from the National Council of Teachers of English in 1994 for her book-length ethnographic study, Social Worlds of Children Learning to Write in an Urban Primary School. The following year, Dyson received the Choice Outstanding Academic Book of the Year (1995), and in 2002 she received the Purves Award from the National Council of Teachers of English as an author of the Research of Teaching English article from the previous year judged as likely to have the greatest impact on educational practice. In 2006, Dyson received the Janet Emig Award for exemplary scholarship from the National Council of Teachers for her article “What Difference does Difference Make? Teacher Perspectives on Diversity, Literacy, and the Urban Primary School” published in ‘’English Education’’ in May, 1995. Again she received the Janet Emig Award in 2006 for the article, “Crafting ‘The Humble Prose of Living’: Rethinking Oral/Written Relations in the Echoes of Spoken Word,” which was published in English Education in 2004. And in 2007, she was selected for the honorable position of “Scholar” by the Hofstra University.

=== Teaching Award ===
Dyson received the Distinguished Teaching Award from the University of California-Berkeley in 1998.

== Dyson's Research ==
=== Dissertation ===
Dyson's dissertation entitled, “A Case Study Examination of the Role of Oral Language in the Writing Processes of Kindergarteners” helped to set the stage for her future research of children's writing in a sociocultural context. In her dissertation, Dyson drew heavily from scholars such as Britton, Vygotsky, Ferreiro, and others who emphasized the critical role that oral language has in literacy learning. For instance, Britton was quoted by Dyson as stating: “All that the children write, your response to what they write, their response to each other, all this takes place afloat upon a sea of talk. Talk is what provides the links between you and them and what they have written, between what they have written and each other.” In her dissertation, Dyson elected qualitative research to investigate the role of oral language in the early writing processes of five kindergarten students over a three-month period. During her case study she collected data, such as observational notes, audio recordings of children's talk, written products, daily log entries, child and parent interviews, and informal assessment tasks. At the conclusion of this study, some of Dyson's findings include: that talk is an integral part of the early writing process, young children write for different purposes, and that there is no one early writing process.

=== Research Focus ===
Anne Haas Dyson's research focuses on the study of early childhood literacies from a sociocultural perspective. Known mainly by her works, Dyson immerses herself in ethnographic research that examines children's writing, in particular story making. Common threads found throughout Dyson's work include her study of primary grade children in urban schools with culturally diverse populations over the course of a year or more. In Dyson's words, “My research focuses on language and literacy development in the early childhood years. I use qualitative and sociolinguistic research procedures to examine written language use from children’s points of view - from within their own social lives” Additionally, Dyson studies the influences of popular culture on young children's literacy development. She comments, “My projects include an interest in written language as part of children’s symbolic repertoire (e.g., talk, drawing, dramatic movement) and in the intersection of childhood cultures and school literacy learning. What matters most to school children is often other children. Written language can become woven into their unofficial childhood practices in ways that co-exist with, contribute to, or conflict with the official school world. Young children’s literacy use often entails their participation in popular culture. So I have become interested in changing notions of written language and of the texts through which people learn and play (particularly those of popular culture), in how children’s literacy use reflects these changing notions, and in how schools should respond to those changes”

=== Methodology ===
Dyson's approach to research through ethnography has allowed her to explore children's language and literacy development holistically as it occurs naturally in sociocultural contexts. Typical of ethnography, her research has sought to explain, describe, and provide insight into human behavior in context. In Dyson's in-depth ethnographies, she reported the devotion of many days and weeks of observation in a new classroom before knowing what would be considered data for her study, stressing the importance of building trust and a rapport between herself, as a researcher, and the classroom members. As reported in her book, The Brothers and Sisters Learn to Write (2003), Dyson describes the importance of being unobtrusive in her observations of children in the classrooms, while at the same time demonstrating interest in their activities: “ …I made no effort to become one of the gang. I was ‘busy' with writing in my notebook, I was ‘interested’ in ‘children,’ and I wouldn’t ‘tell on them.’ So, as Rita [classroom teacher] taught a lesson, circulated among the children, or modeled working on her product, I sat, pen in hand, legal pad on lap, watching and writing without looking at the pad (a feat that never fails to impress first graders). (p. 21).

Dyson deliberately chooses classrooms contusive to her research interest: how young children construct their understandings of symbolic communication, including learning to write. She therefore seeks classroom teachers whose instruction allows children the freedom to construct their own understandings of literacy in an accepting environment. In these classrooms, Dyson seeks child informants who actively produce evolving constructions of writing and who are relaxed enough to open up to Dyson in order to talk about their work and answer questions regarding it. In Dyson's book-length ethnographic studies, she pulls together the pieces of her studies into meaningful wholes through the interpretation of triangulated data (e.g., field notes, tape recordings, interviews, artifacts, etc.). By doing this, she tells the stories of children's literacy experiences that meet at the crossroads of official (e.g., classroom, school curriculum, etc.) and unofficial (e.g., peer groups, family, neighborhoods, popular media, etc.) worlds.

=== The Brothers and Sisters Learn to Write ===
An example of Dyson's work is given in her book The Brothers and Sisters Learn to Write: Popular Literacies in Childhood and School Cultures (2003). The book is an ethnographic study that takes place in a first grade classroom in an urban school over an academic year. The school in this study had a socioeconomic mix consisting of approximately 50% African American, a third European American, and the remaining was of varied Latino and Asian ancestries. Approximately 40% of the student population qualified for free or reduced lunch. Dyson typically seeks out schools such as this in order to examine their complex classroom communities which are rich in cultural and social diversity. Dyson looks from inside a child's culture out toward the school's demands in order to provide conceptual substance for a theoretical view of written language development that considers broad conceptions of children's literacy resources and learning pathways. She expresses concern for the narrow windows that educators inside the official school world view children's lives, where, Dyson states, “children’s cultural worlds as children--the breadth of their textual experience, the depth of their social and symbolic adaptability—disappear.” (p. 5)

The focus is on six African American children, known as “the brothers and sisters”: Marcel, Wenona, Denise, Vanessa, Noah, and Lakeisha, who bonded together at school and considered themselves “fake” siblings. During the study, Dyson observed these children as they negotiated their way among the official worlds of school and the unofficial worlds that were governed by their peers, family, homes, churches, neighborhoods, the popular media, etc. Her study focused on children's interactions in and out of official and unofficial worlds and how this influenced their literacy learning. Drawing heavily from Bakhtin (1981), Dyson situates children on a “landscape of voices” that allows her to portray how children maneuver through social space, rather than only how they participate in the recurrent practices of the official world over time. Additionally, Dyson explored certain types of cultural material (sports, music, movies, etc.) as well as particular children's processes of transforming it into official practices (i.e., writing stories, journal entries, etc.). This ethnographic study is representative of Dyson's work in that it focuses on literacy development from a sociocultural perspective and explores the effects of the popular media on literacy learning.

== Selected articles ==
Dyson, A. H. (1984). Emerging alphabetic literacy in school contexts: Toward defining the gap between school curriculum and child mind. Written Communication, 1(1), 5-55.

Dyson, A. H. (1987). Individual differences in beginning composing: An orchestral vision of learning to compose. Written Communication, 4(4), 411-442.

Dyson, A. H. (1990). Weaving possibilities: Rethinking metaphors for early literacy development. The Reading Teacher, 44(3), 202-213.

Dyson, A. H. (1992). The case of the singing scientist: A performance perspective on the" stages" of school literacy. Written Communication, 9(1), 3-47.

Dyson, A. H. (1995). Writing children: Reinventing the development of childhood literacy. Written Communication, 12(1), 4-46.

Dyson, A. H. (1998). Folk processes and media creatures: Reflections on popular culture for literacy educators. The Reading Teacher, 51(5), 392-402.

Dyson, A. H. (1999). Coach bombay. Research in the Teaching of English, 33(4), 367-402.

Dyson, A. H. (1988). Negotiating among multiple worlds: The Space/Time dimensions of young children (Report No. 15). Berkeley, CA: California University Center for the Study of Writing. (ERIC Document Reproduction Service No. ED297334)

Dyson, A. H. (1989). Multiple worlds of child writers: Friends learning to write. NY: Teachers College Press.

Dyson, A. H. (1990). Research in review. symbol makers, symbol weavers: How children link play, pictures and print. Young Children, 45(2), 50-57.

Dyson, A. H. (1992). "Whistle for willie," lost puppies, and cartoon dogs: The sociocultural dimensions of young children (Report No. CSW-TR-63). Berkeley, CA: National Center for the Study of Writing and Literacy. (ERIC Document Reproduction Service No. ED355513)

Dyson, A. H. (1993). Social worlds of children learning to write in an urban primary school. New York: Teachers College Press.

Dyson, A. H. (1993). A sociocultural perspective on symbolic development in primary grade classrooms. New Directions for Child and Adolescent Development, (61), 25-39.

Dyson, A. H., & Genishi, C. (1994). The need for story: Cultural diversity in classroom and community. Urbana, IL: National Council of Teachers of English.

Dyson, A. H. (1995). Children out of bounds: The power of case studies in expanding visions of literacy development (Report No. CSW-TR-73). Berkeley, CA: National Center for the Study of Writing and Literacy. (ERIC Document Reproduction Service No. ED384869)

Dyson, A. H. (1997). Writing superheroes: Contemporary childhood, popular culture, and classroom literacy,. NY: Teachers College Press.

Dyson, A. H. (2001). Donkey kong in little bear country: A first grader's composing development in the media spotlight. The Elementary School Journal, 101(4), 417-433.

Dyson, A. H. (2003). "Welcome to the jam": Popular culture, school literacy, and the making of childhoods. Harvard Educational Review, 73(3), 328-361.

Dyson, A. H. (2005). Crafting "the humble prose of living": Rethinking Oral/Written relations in the echoes of spoken word. English Education, 37(2), 149-164.

Dyson, A. H. (2006). Literacy in a child's world of voices, or, the fine print of murder and mayhem. Research in the Teaching of English, 41(2), 147-153.

Dyson, A. H. (2006). On saying it right (write):" fix-its" in the foundations of learning to write. Research in the Teaching of English, 41(1), 8-42.

Dyson, A. H. (2003). The brothers and sisters learn to write: Popular literacies in childhood and school cultures. New York: Teachers College Press.

Dyson, A. H. (2003). Popular literacies and the" all" children: Rethinking literacy development for contemporary childhoods. Language Arts, 81(2), 100-109.

Dyson, A. H. (2013). ReWRITING the basics: literacy learning in children's cultures. NY: Teachers College Press.

Dyson, A. H. (2016). Child Cultures, schooling, and literacy: Global perspectives on composing unique lives. NY: Routledge.
