= Timothy D. Stark =

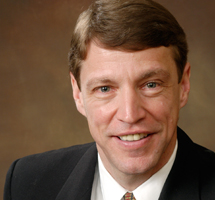
- Dr. Timothy D. Stark, Ph.D., P.E.
- Born: December 25, 1963
- Occupation(s): Civil engineer, Geotechnical engineer

Timothy D. Stark is a Professor of Geotechnical Engineering in the Department of Civil and Environmental Engineering at the University of Illinois at Urbana–Champaign since 1991. Dr. Stark teaches undergraduate and graduate courses in Foundation Engineering and Earth Structures, respectively, in the Department of Civil and Environmental Engineering at the UIUC and numerous short courses for various entities. Stark has served as a consultant and expert on a range of domestic and international projects including levees and dams, buildings, bridges, slopes, geosynthetics, seismic issues, waste containment facilities, and highways.

== Honors and awards ==
Stark has received a number of awards for his activities including the Thomas A. Middlebrooks Award from the American Society of Civil Engineers (ASCE) in 2012 and 1998; being selected Editor in 2013 and Associate Editor of the Year in 2012 of the ASCE Journal of Geotechnical and Geoenvironmental Engineering; R.M. Quigley Award from the Canadian Geotechnical Society in 2003; R.S. Ladd Standards Development Award from the ASTM in 2011 and 2002; Walter L. Huber Research Prize from the ASCE in 1999; University Scholar Award from UIUC in 1998; News Correspondent Award from the ASCE in 1995; Dow Outstanding New Faculty Award from the American Society for Engineering Education in 1994; Xerox Award for Faculty Research from UIUC in 1993; Arthur Casagrande Professional Development Award from the ASCE in 1992; and Edmund Friedman Young Engineer Award for Professional Achievement, from the ASCE in 1991. He is a registered Professional Engineer in Illinois, Colorado, Louisiana, and Washington.
