= Vivian Zapata =

American artist

Vivian Zapata was selected as the official artist of the 6th Annual Latin Grammy Awards held in Los Angeles, California.

Zapata's artwork was used as the official image for the event.
