= Janis Driver Treworgy =

American academic and sedimentary geologist

Janis D. Treworgy
- Born: February 6, 1954
- Died: April 7, 2015 (aged 61)
- Education: Principia College (BA, 1975); University of Illinois (MA, 1983); University of Illinois (PhD, 1985)
- Scientific career
- Fields: Sedimentary Geology

Janis Driver Treworgy (February 6, 1954 – April 7, 2015) was an American academic and sedimentary geologist.

== Early life and education ==
Treworgy was born on February 6, 1954, in Santa Monica, California. She received her Bachelor of Science from Principia College in 1975. She went to the University of Illinois and received her Masters in 1983 and her PhD in 1985.

== Career ==
Treworgy was a Paleozoic stratigrapher and sedimentary geologist for 25 years. She made significant contributions towards the creation of a highly detailed network of structural cross sections of the Paleozoic succession in the Illinois Basin.

Treworgy cofounded the Countryside School of Champaign, a K-8 independent school, where she served as the first president of the board from 1992-1995, and a board member until 1999. She also functioned as the Head of School before an official position was created, in addition to filling other roles at the school.

Treworgy was involved with the National Association of Geoscience Teachers (NAGT) since the mid-1990s. She developed the Illinois state curriculum materials for NAGT, later being involved with the organization at a national level and serving as the Central Section secretary/treasurer, 1st vice president, 2nd vice president, and president; and as president helped NAGT transition the Journal of Geoscience Education to an online publication, begin publication of In the Trenches, and establish Geo2YC.

In 2000, Treworgy became a teacher at Principia College. Around that time a mammoth tooth was accidentally unearthed on campus by workman and she led a team to excavate the full mammoth skeleton found in the area, which was a significant find in the central United States. She also led trips for students to study classic geological features around the United States. Treworgy was the chair of the Department of Geology at Principia College and a member of the Illinois State Geological Survey (ISGS). Her research primarily focused on the Illinois Basin particularly the stratigraphy, depositional environments, and tectonic history.

== Personal life ==
Treworgy was married to Colin Treworgy for forty years and they had two children. They lived in Grafton, Illinois.

She died on April 7, 2015.

== Publications ==
- Treworgy, Janis Driver (1985). Stratigraphy and depositional settings of the Chesterian (Mississippian) Fraileys/Big Clifty and Haney Formations in the Illinois Basin (Thesis). ProQuest 303343597.
- Partnering to improve undergraduate teaching: NAGT and AGU join forces (Jun 2012)
- Paradigms and proboscideans in the southern Great Lakes region, USA (Apr 2010)
- Mammoth (Mammuthus sp.) excavation on a college campus in Western Illinois, USA (Jul 2007)
- Role of Large Scale Fluid-Flow in Subsurface Arsenic Enrichment (May 2007)
- Depositional facies and sequence stratigraphy of a Lower Carboniferous bryozoan-crinoidal carbonate ramp in the Illinois Basin, mid-continent USA (Jan 1998)
- Reservoir development in bryozoan bafflestone facies of the Ullin (Warsaw) Limestone (Middle Mississippian) in the Illinois basin (Aug 1994)
- Illinois Basin--Tectonically Influenced Ramp During Chesterian (Jan 1986)
- Coal resources of Illinois, Colchester (No. 2), Dekoven, and Jamestown coals
- Depositional history of the Mississippian Ullin and Fort Payne Formations in the Illinois Basin
- Coal resources of Illinois, Davis, Murphysboro, and Seelyville coals
- Stratigraphy and depositional settings of the Chesterian (Mississippian) Fraileys/Big Clifty and Haney formations in the Illinois Basin
