= Josephine Burns Glasgow =

American mathematician

Josephine Elizabeth Burns Glasgow
- Born: July 22, 1887
- Died: January 22, 1969 (aged 81)
- Education: the University of Illinois.
- Occupation: an American mathematician

Josephine Elizabeth Burns Glasgow (July 22, 1887 – January 22, 1969) was an American mathematician whose Ph.D. thesis, "The abstract definitions of the groups of degree 8" was published in the American Journal of Mathematics. She was the second woman to receive a PhD from the University of Illinois.

== Life ==
Glasgow was born in Greenville, Illinois. She was the third of four children. Her parents were Ida Jane and James Clinton Burns. Her father was a professor of history at Western Illinois University.

She married Robert D. Glasgow in 1916.

In 1928 Glasgow's husband took a post as state entomologist of New York State and the couple moved to Albany. Josephine became active in the American Association of University Women, rising through various roles to be the vice president of the national board of directors in 1952. In 1951 the Albany section named a fellowship in her honour.

== Career ==
Glasgow received her A.B. degree in 1909 and her master's degree in mathematics in 1911. She received her PhD from the University of Illinois in 1913, being the second woman to do so at that university. Her doctoral supervisor was George Abram Miller.

She was an instructor at the University of Illinois.
