= Jessica Steinrock =

American intimacy coordinator

Jessica Steinrock is an American intimacy coordinator.

== Education ==
Steinrock earned a bachelor's degree in advertising from the University of Illinois, Urbana-Champaign, graduating in 2014. She went on to receive a master’s degree in theater at the school, graduating in 2017. Her focus was on consent in improvisational theater. She also completed a PhD from the University of Illinois, graduating in 2020.

== Career ==
Steinrock's interest in intimacy coordination came from her background in improv comedy, where she was sometimes touched or talked about in ways she found uncomfortable. Her first work as an intimacy coordinator was for an orgy scene in the TNT show Claws.

Steinrock is the chief executive of Intimacy Directors and Coordinators, which was founded in 2019. The organization is "the leading training and accreditation organization in the field," according to The New York Times. In this role, Steinrock participated in a working group for the Screen Actors Guild to update the group's safety standards for intimate scenes.

Steinrock's work in television has included TNT's Animal Kingdom, Netflix's Never Have I Ever, Hulu's Little Fires Everywhere, HBO's Winning Time: The Rise of the Lakers Dynasty, and Showtime's Yellowjackets. She also worked on the set of 2021 film Moxie.

Steinrock is on SAG-AFTRA's intimacy coordinator registry.

== Online presence ==
In April 2022, Steinrock started a TikTok account. Her content includes education about her job, including answering questions and showing modesty garments, and breakdowns of sexual scenes in popular television shows and films. By August 2022, she had accumulated 400,000 followers and 9.2 million likes; by 2023, this had increased to 40 million likes.

== Personal life ==
Steinrock is based in Chicago. She met her husband, Zev, a fight director and an associate theater professor at the University of Illinois, through her work as an intimacy coordinator.
