= Rakesh M. Bhatt =

American linguist

Rakesh Mohan Bhatt is a professor of Linguistics at the University of Illinois at Urbana-Champaign. He received his MA in linguistics with a specialization in sociolinguistics from The University of Pittsburgh in 1987. He also received his PhD in linguistics with a specialization in syntax from the University of Illinois at Urbana-Champaign in 1994. He is the author of two published books: Verb Movement and the Syntax of Kashmiri and World Englishes: The Study of New Linguistic Varieties (co-authored with Rajend Mesthrie). He is famous for his works on Migration, Minorities, and Multilingualism, Language Contact and Code-switching, and Language Ideology, Planning, Maintenance and Shift. His work on Code-switching and Optimal Grammar of Bilingual Language Use (Co-authored with Agnes Bolonyai) offers a new perspective on the study of motivations for code-switching.
