= Thomas Gillespie (epidemiologist) =

American ecologist and epidemiologist

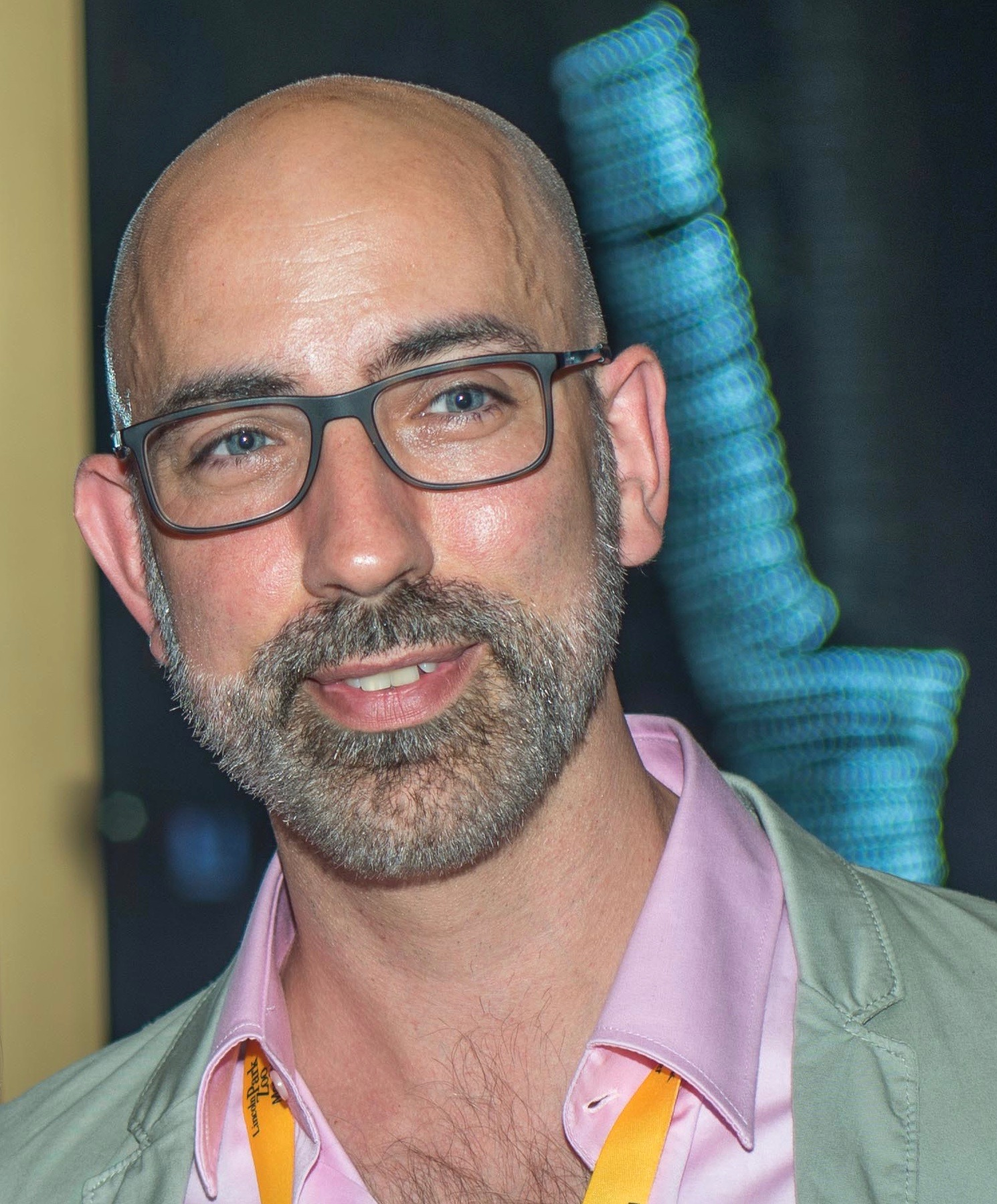
- Thomas Gillespie in Chicago in 2016
- Born: Thomas Gillespie; U.S.A.
- Education: Undergraduate:University of Illinois at Urbana–Champaign, Graduate:University of Florida
- Occupations: Ecologist, Epidemiologist, Primatologist, Conservationist

Thomas Gillespie is a disease ecologist and conservation biologist recognized for his integrative approach to the conservation of biodiversity and mitigation of emerging infectious diseases. He is currently Professor and Chair of Environmental Sciences at Emory University.

Gillespie was among the first to demonstrate that human impact on the environment can alter the dynamics of natural pathogens in wildlife, and create opportunities for pathogens to jump between species. His efforts serve as demonstration projects of the One Health Approach. He has, also, guided international efforts to protect endangered species from human diseases and prevent future pandemics.
