= Deborah M. Hinton =

American microbiologist

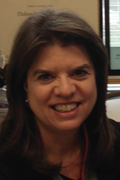
- Born: 1953 (age 72–73)
- Education: University of North Carolina at Chapel Hill (BS); University of Illinois at Urbana–Champaign (MS, PhD)
- Scientific career
- Workplaces: National Institute of Diabetes and Digestive and Kidney Diseases
- Thesis: The synthesis of oligodeoxyribonucleotides with RNA ligase (1980)

Deborah Meetze Hinton (born 1953) is an American microbiologist. She is a senior investigator and chief of the gene expression and regulation section in the laboratory of cell and molecular biology at the National Institute of Diabetes and Digestive and Kidney Diseases.

== Life ==
Hinton completed a B.S. at University of North Carolina at Chapel Hill in 1974. Her undergraduate honors thesis was titled Electrochemical generation of metal dendrites as field desorption emitters. Hinton earned a M.S. (1976) and Ph.D. (1980) from University of Illinois at Urbana–Champaign. Her dissertation was titled The synthesis of oligodeoxyribonucleotides with RNA ligase. Her doctoral advisor was R.I. Gumport. She was a postdoctoral fellow of the American Cancer Society from 1980 to 1982.

Hinton is a senior investigator and chief of the gene expression and regulation section in the laboratory of cell and molecular biology at the National Institute of Diabetes and Digestive and Kidney Diseases. She researches how the process of transcription initiation and activation is regulated at a molecular level. Her scientific focus areas include microbiology, infectious diseases, molecular biology, and biochemistry.

Hinton became a member of the American Society for Microbiology in 2009.
