= Stephen McLin =

Stephen McLin was a longtime executive in the banking industry who came to the industry from an engineering, rather than a finance background.

McLin, the oldest of six children, was the son of an Air Force doctor. He grew up moving every few years, including almost three years in Wiesbaden, Germany, where his father was chief of surgery. Returning to the United States, McLin went to high school in Laredo, Texas, and graduated in 1964. McLin's father was then named hospital commander at Chanute Air Force Base in Rantoul, Illinois, so McLin went to college at the nearby University of Illinois at Urbana–Champaign. He majored in chemical engineering (now called the Department of Chemical and Biomolecular Engineering) and graduated with a Bachelor of Science in 1968.

== Career ==
After graduation, McLin took a job with Atlantic Richfield (ARCO) in Anaheim, California. After working there for a year, McLin attended Stanford University and earned a master's degree in mechanical engineering (1970). Along the way he discovered he was more interested in finance, so then stayed at Stanford and earned an MBA in 1972.

McLin worked much of his career at Bank of America (BofA), buying and selling other companies. He started out as assistant vice president in the cashiers division and in seven years rose to become BofA's top strategist. His first major deal was BofA's purchase of Charles Schwab Corporation, a major discount broker, in 1981. This transaction developed into what New York Times reporter Tom Friedman called a “historic test case for Federal banking laws.” McLin also “engineered” the purchase of failing Seattle-based bank, Seafirst, which enabled Bank of America to enter a state outside California, where it was based. McLin invented a financial structure, which he called “shrink-to-fit financing,” that protected BofA if Seafirst's losses in the energy sector became even worse than they already were.,

In 1985 McLin was BankAmerica's third-highest-paid executive, receiving $285,330 in salary. In 1986 McLin became executive vice president and BankAmerica Corp. a subsidiary of Bank of America. In the course of his career at Bank of America, America First and STM Holdings, LLC, McLin negotiated more than 40 transactions, acquisitions and sales, which represented total assets in excess of $32 billion.

In 1987, at the age of 40, McLin left BofA to become president of America First Financial Fund. There he raised $100 million in equity capital to buy two Northern California S&Ls. When America First shut down a decade later it had returned more than $500 million in dividends and gains to its shareholders.

McLin retired at age 51, created the McLin Family Foundation, and served on the Schwab board from 1988 to 2019.
