= William O. Stanley =

William Oliver Stanley, Jr. is a former professor in the University of Illinois at Urbana-Champaign at the Urbana College of Education. He was one of the founders of the social foundations of education, an approach to the sociology of education.

== Journalist, communist, anti-communist ==
Stanley was a former journalist and combatant for the Republicans in the Spanish Civil War, and a member of the Communist Party of the USA in the 1930s. After World War II, he became a member of the early anti-Communist Congress for Cultural Freedom, but was shocked by later excesses of McCarthyism.

== Sociology ==
He was the author of "Education and Social Integration," Bureau of Publications, Teachers college Columbia University, New York, 1953. In Chapter 10, Approaches to a Disciplined Methodology of Discussion, and Chapter 11, Method and the Democratic Ethic in the Formulation of Public Policy, he anticipates the major theme of Jurgen Habermas' major work The theory of Communicative Action.
