= 1971 in science =

The year 1971 in science and technology involved some significant events, listed below.

== Astronomy and space exploration ==
- January 31 – Apollo program: Astronauts aboard Apollo 14 lift off for a mission to the Moon.
- February 5 – Apollo 14 lands on the Moon.
- February 9 – Apollo program: Apollo 14 returns to Earth after the third crewed Moon landing.
- May 19 – Mars probe program: Mars 2 is launched by the Soviet Union.
- May 30 – Mariner program: Mariner 9 is launched toward Mars.
- June 30 – The crew of the Soyuz 11 spacecraft are killed when their air supply leaks out through a faulty valve during re-entry preparations, the only human deaths to occur outside Earth's atmosphere.
- July 26 – Apollo program: Launch of Apollo 15. On July 31 the Apollo 15 astronauts become the first to ride in a lunar rover a day after landing on the Moon's surface.
- November 13 – Mariner program: Mariner 9 enters Mars orbit.

== Biology ==
- July – Francis G. Howarth discovers communities of specialized thermophile cave animals living in lava tubes at Hawaii Volcanoes National Park.
- C. A. W. Jeekel publishes Nomenclator Generum et Familiarum Diplopodorum.
- John O'Keefe discovers place cells in the mammalian brain.

== Computer science ==
- July 4 – Michael S. Hart posts the first e-book, a copy of the United States Declaration of Independence, on the University of Illinois at Urbana–Champaign's mainframe computer, the origin of Project Gutenberg.
- November 3 – The Unix Programmer's Manual is published.
- November 15 – Intel release the world's first microprocessor, the 4004.
- November/December – Computer Space is released, the first arcade video game.
- Ray Tomlinson sends the first ARPAnet e-mail between host computers, at BBN, Cambridge, Massachusetts, with the first use of the @ sign in an address.
- Kenbak-1 goes on sale, considered to be the world's first personal computer by the Computer History Museum and the American Computer Museum.
- The earliest floppy disks, 8 inches in diameter, become commercially available as components of products shipped by IBM, their inventor.

== Conservation ==
- February 2 – The international Ramsar Convention for the conservation and sustainable utilization of wetlands is signed in Ramsar, Mazandaran, Iran.

== Earth sciences ==
- February 9 – The San Fernando (Sylmar) earthquake occurs in southern California with a magnitude of 6.6 and a perceived intensity of XI (extreme) on the Modified Mercalli intensity scale.

== Mathematics ==
- Stephen Cook introduces the concept of NP-completeness in computational complexity theory at the 3rd Annual ACM Symposium on Theory of Computing.
- Daniel Quillen publishes a proof of the Adams conjecture.
- Steven Takiff introduces Takiff algebras.
- The Quine–Putnam indispensability argument is first presented explicitly, by Hilary Putnam in his book Philosophy of Logic.

== Medicine ==
- April 1 – Alternating hemiplegia of childhood is first characterized.
- October 1 – Godfrey Hounsfield's invention, X-ray computed tomography, is first used on a patient with a cerebral cyst at Atkinson Morley Hospital in Wimbledon, London.
- Boston Women's Health Book Collective publishes Our Bodies, Ourselves in the U.S.
- E. G. L. Bywaters characterizes adult-onset Still's disease, a rare form of inflammatory arthritis.
- Smallpox is eradicated from the Americas.

== Paleontology ==
- August 3 – The Fighting Dinosaurs, a fossil specimen featuring a Velociraptor and a Protoceratops in combat, is first located in the Late Cretaceous Djadochta Formation of Mongolia by a Polish-Mongolian team.

== Physics ==
- Roger Penrose proposes the Penrose process.

== Psychology ==
- August 14–20 – Stanford prison experiment.
- Konrad Lorenz publishes Studies in Animal and Human Behavior, Volume II.

== Technology ==
- Richard H. Frenkiel, Joel S. Engel and Philip T. Porter of Bell Labs in the United States set out the parameters for a practical cellular telephone network.
- J. J. Stiffler publishes his book Theory of Synchronous Communications and edits a special issue of IEEE Transactions on Communication Technology on error correction codes.

== Institutions ==
- Paris Descartes University begins to function in continuation of the medical department of the University of Paris.

== Awards ==
- Nobel Prizes
  - Physics – Dennis Gabor
  - Chemistry – Gerhard Herzberg
  - Medicine – Earl W Sutherland, Jr
- Turing Award – John McCarthy

== Births ==
- May 29 – Howard Gobioff (d. 2008), American computer scientist.
- June 28 – Elon Musk, South African-born Canadian-American entrepreneur, engineer, inventor and investor.
- July 4 – Sivakumar Veerasamy, Indian plant geneticist.
- July 21 – Sara Seager, Canadian-American astrophysicist.
- August 2 – Ruth Lawrence, English-born mathematician.
- November 18 – Karl Deisseroth, American optogeneticist, Nobel Prize laureate.

== Deaths ==
- January 23 – Fritz Feigl (b. 1891), Austrian-born Brazilian chemist
- January 25 – Donald Winnicott (b. 1896), English child psychiatrist.
- February 16 – Heinrich Willi (b. 1900), Swiss pediatrician.
- February 25 – Theodor Svedberg (b. 1884), Swedish chemist, Nobel Prize laureate
- March 11 – Philo T. Farnsworth (b. 1906), American television pioneer.
- April 1 – Dame Kathleen Lonsdale (b. 1903), Irish-born crystallographer.
- April 6 – Margaret Newton (b. 1887), Canadian plant pathologist.
- April 12 – Igor Tamm (b. 1895), Russian physicist, Nobel Prize laureate
- June 6 – Edward Andrade (b. 1887), English physicist.
- June 15
  - Hillel Oppenheimer (b. 1899), German-born Israeli botanist.
  - Wendell Meredith Stanley (b. 1904), American chemist, Nobel Prize laureate.
- June 30 – Soviet cosmonauts
  - Georgy Dobrovolsky (b. 1928)
  - Vladislav Volkov (b. 1935)
  - Viktor Patsayev (b. 1933)
- September 15 – Benno Mengele (b. 1898), Austrian electrical engineer
