= 2008 in science =

The year 2008 involved numerous significant scientific events and discoveries, some of which are listed below.

== Astronomy ==
- 10 January - NASA's Spitzer Space Telescope detects massive black holes in anomalously small galaxies.
- 15 January - NASA's MESSENGER spacecraft makes the first of its three flybys of Mercury at an altitude of 200 kilometres (120 mi), decreasing its velocity for its 2011 orbital insertion.
- 20 January – British space experts begin constructing an ion drive for a Mercury-bound spacecraft.
- 23 January – NASA's S-3 Viking aircraft returns to the agency's Glenn Research Center after extensive modifications to transform it from a carrier-based military aircraft to a state-of-the-art icing research aircraft.
- 7 February – An annular solar eclipse takes place.
- 5 March – Scientists solve a 40-year-old puzzle by identifying the origin of the intense radio waves in the Earth's upper atmosphere that control the dynamics of the Van Allen radiation belts.
- 12 March – The Cassini spacecraft performed a close flyby of Enceladus, coming within 50 kilometres (31 mi) of the moon's surface, its closest encounter yet with the sixth-largest moon of Saturn.
- 19 March – The gamma-ray burst GRB 080319B, the farthest object that could be seen by the naked eye, is observed.
- 8 June – NASA's Pluto probe New Horizons crosses the orbit of Saturn, after a journey of over two years.
- 1 August – A total solar eclipse takes place, visible in northern Canada, Siberia, Mongolia and northern China.
- 25 September – Shenzhou 7, the third spaceflight of the Chinese space program and their first to include extra-vehicular activity, launches from the Jiuquan Satellite Launch Center.
- 28 September – Falcon 1 Flight 4 was the first successful orbital launch of any privately funded and developed, liquid-propelled carrier rocket, the SpaceX Falcon 1.
- 6 October – NASA's MESSENGER spacecraft makes the second of its three flybys of Mercury.
- 7 October – 2008 TC3 becomes the first Earth-impacting meteoroid spotted and tracked prior to impact.

== Biology ==
- 2 January – Researchers report that just four months of hormonal therapy before and with standard external beam radiation therapy can slow cancer growth by as much as eight years – especially the development of bone metastases – and increase survival rates in older men with potentially aggressive prostate cancer.
- 3 January – Gene therapy can reduce long-term drinking among rodents “An ‘experiment of nature’ is observed in some individuals of East Asian origin, who are 66 to 99 percent protected against alcoholism,” explained Yedy Israel, professor of pharmacological and toxicological chemistry.
- 7 January
  - Researchers identify a gene linked to cerebral venous thrombosis, a condition that causes blood clots in the veins of the brain that can lead to stroke. The condition is more common in young and middle-aged women.
  - New research reveals that Pleistocene cave bears, a species which became extinct 20,000 years ago, ate both plants and animals and competed for food with the other contemporary animals, instead of being vegetarian as previously assumed.
- 10 January
  - Overweight people who lose a moderate amount of weight get an immediate benefit in the form of better heart health, according to a study conducted at Washington University School of Medicine.
- 11 January – Biologists create baker's yeast capable of living to 800 in yeast years – a tenfold increase in longevity – without apparent side effects.
- 13 January
  - An international study of 20,000 people discovers seven genes that influence blood cholesterol levels.
  - Following studies involving more than 35,000 people and a survey across the entire human genome, an international team supported in part by the National Institutes of Health (NIH) discovers that common genetic variants linked to osteoarthritis are also involved in governing human height.
  - University of Minnesota researchers create a functioning heart in the laboratory by using whole organ decellularization.
- 16 January – NASA begins a collaboration with charities and universities to investigate the potential of carbon nanotubes to diagnose and treat brain tumors.
- 24 January – Scientists develop a pill-sized medical camera that can be safely swallowed by patients, allowing illnesses to be diagnosed more quickly.
- 28 January – Researchers confirm a genetic alteration that triggers prostate cancer in both mice and humans.
- 1 February – Research from Vanderbilt University proves that the brain processes aggression as a reward, offering insights into the human preoccupation with violence.
- 4 February – American researchers demonstrate microneedles that can be used to efficiently transfer medicines into the bloodstream without the use of conventional syringes.
- 5 February – Two proteins studied by a University at Buffalo immunologist appear to have the potential to enhance the production of antibodies against a multitude of infectious agents.
- 26 February – Encyclopedia of Life website launched.
- 20 March – The U.S. Food and Drug Administration approves a new medical adhesive – a fibrin sealant called Artiss – for use in attaching skin grafts to burn patients.
- 2 April – A hybrid human-cow embryo survives a third straight day after being fertilized at Newcastle University, England. A director for embryonic stem cell laboratories at the Australian Stem Cell Centre says that the "99-per-cent human" embryo could improve research within the field of human diseases. However, the Catholic Church states that the creation is "monstrous", and says that the later destruction of it is unethical.
- June – Spanish surgeon Paolo Macchiarini carries out the world's first tissue-engineered whole organ transplant, successfully replacing a Colombian woman's tuberculosis-damaged windpipe with a new windpipe made with the patient's own stem cells.

== Computer Science ==
- 5 January – Designer Avery Holleman develops the concept of a Napkin PC, a device that uses e-paper and radio frequency (RF) technology to enable creative groups to collaborate more effectively.
- 8 January – SanDisk Corporation begins to sample 12-gigabyte (GB) microSDHC flash memory cards to major phone manufacturers for testing and evaluation.
- 17 January – Duke University scientists use the brain activity of a monkey to control the real-time walking patterns of a robot halfway around the world.
- 20 November – The Conficker computer worm is first detected.

== Earth Science ==
- 4 January – The National Science Foundation (NSF) and the National Aeronautics and Space Administration (NASA) jointly achieve a new milestone in scientific ballooning in Antarctica, by launching and operating three long-duration suborbital flights within a single Southern Hemisphere summer.
- 19 January – The first evidence of a volcanic eruption from beneath Antarctica’s most rapidly changing ice sheet is published in the journal Nature Geoscience.
- 2 May – The Chaitén volcano in Chile enters a new eruptive phase for the first time since around 1640.
- 3 May – Cyclone Nargis passes through Myanmar, killing more than 138,000 people.
- 12 May – An earthquake measuring 7.9 on the moment magnitude scale strikes Sichuan, China, killing an estimated 87,000 people.
- November–December – A scientific expedition to Lake Untersee in Antarctica finds chemolithotropes.

== Finance ==
- 1 November – Bitcoin is first proposed in a mailing posted to The Cryptography Mailing by a developer under the name of Satoshi Nakamoto.

== Material Science ==
- 14 January – An American scientist creates the darkest known material, around four times darker than the previous record holder.
- 15 January – University of Pennsylvania engineers and physicians develop a carbon nanopipette thousands of times thinner than a human hair that can measure electric currents and deliver fluids into cells.
- 25 January – European researchers develop a breakthrough interface that allows users to touch, stretch and pull virtual fabrics that feel like the real thing.
- June – The mineral magnesiopascoite is formally described.

== Palaeontology ==
- 14 January – Scientists find that dinosaurs' growth and sexual maturation were surprisingly similar to that of mammals, even encompassing teenage pregnancy.

== Physics ==
- 25 January – Researchers at the Max Planck Institute for Gravitational Physics and Leibniz University Hanover produce a laser beam of especially high quality.
- 10 September – The Large Hadron Collider (LHC) at CERN begins proton beam tests.
- 19 September – A magnet in the LHC fails, damaging several other magnets and requiring substantial repairs.

== Technology ==
- 28 January – Scientists build the world's first all-nanotube transistor radios.
- 1 April – A handheld 3D imaging device is developed for use in forensics and medical imaging.
- 24 September – The world's first commercial wave farm begins operation off the coast of Portugal.
- 10 November – The Martin Jetpack flies for 46 seconds, 13 seconds longer than any previous jetpack.

== Prizes ==
=== Abel Prize ===
- 2008 Abel Prize: John G. Thompson and Jacques Tits

=== Nobel Prize ===
- 2008 Nobel Prize in Physiology or Medicine: Harald zur Hausen, Françoise Barré-Sinoussi and Luc Montagnier
- 2008 Nobel Prize in Physics: Makoto Kobayashi, Toshihide Maskawa and Yoichiro Nambu
- 2008 Nobel Prize in Chemistry: Osamu Shimomura, Martin Chalfie and Roger Y. Tsien

== Deaths ==
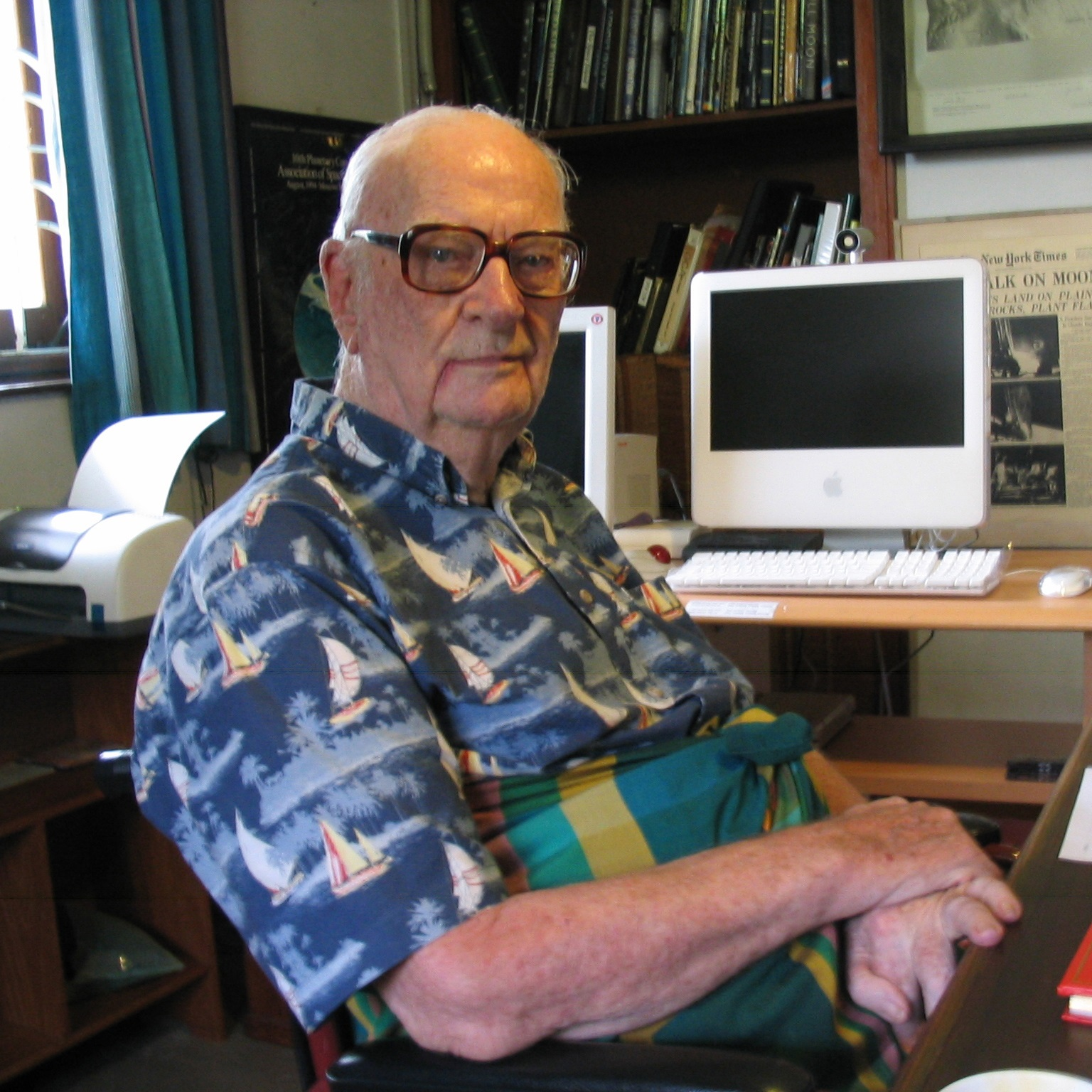
19 March 2008: Arthur C. Clarke, a British futurist and science fiction author, dies aged 90.

- 12 January – Howard Dalton (b. 1944), British microbiologist.
- 11 February – Norbert Pfennig (b. 1925), German microbiologist.
- 5 March – David Challinor (b. 1920), American biologist, naturalist, and scientific administrator at the Smithsonian Institution.
- 11 March – Howard Gobioff (b. 1971), American computer scientist.
- 19 March – Arthur C. Clarke (b. 1917), British science fiction author, futurist and inventor.
- 8 April – Graham Higman (b. 1917), British mathematician.
- 13 April – John Wheeler (b. 1911), American theoretical physicist, coined the terms black hole and wormhole.
- 16 April – Edward Norton Lorenz (b. 1917), American mathematician and meteorologist, coined the term butterfly effect.
- 29 April – Albert Hofmann (b. 1906), Swiss chemist, synthesizer of LSD.
- 15 May – Willis Lamb (b. 1913), American physicist, winner of the 1955 Nobel Prize in Physics.
- 20 May – Jürgen Ehlers (b. 1929), German physicist.
- 15 June – Arthur Galston (b. 1920), American botanist and bioethicist.
- 22 July – Victor A. McKusick (b. 1921), American geneticist, known as the "Father of Genetic Medicine".
- 5 August – Neil Bartlett (b. 1932), British chemist who prepared the first compound of a noble gas.
- 23 August – Thomas Huckle Weller (b. 1915), American virologist and co-winner of the 1954 Nobel Prize in Physiology or Medicine for his work on polio.
- 8 September – Ruxandra Sireteanu (b.1945), Romanian neuroscientist.
- 8 October – George Emil Palade (b. 1912), Romanian cell biologist, winner of the 1974 Nobel Prize in Physiology or Medicine, discoverer of the ribosomes of the endoplasmic reticulum.
- 10 November – George Rédei (b. 1921), Hungarian biologist.
- 14 November – Adrian Kantrowitz (b. 1918), American cardiac surgeon.
- 30 November – Ralph A. Lewin (b. 1921), Anglo-American biologist, known as "the father of green algae genetics".
- 12 December – Daniel Carleton Gajdusek (b. 1923), Hungarian-Slovak-American physician, winner of the 1976 Nobel Prize in Physiology or Medicine, famous for his work on kuru, the first human prion disease demonstrated to be infectious.

== See also ==
- 2008 in archaeology
- 2008 in paleontology
- 2008 in spaceflight
- List of emerging technologies
