= Lee M. Talbot =

American ecologist (1930–2021)

Lee Merriam Talbot (1930–2021) was an American ecologist, who became Chief Scientist to the Council on Environmental Quality. He was Director-General of the International Union for Conservation of Nature (IUCN) from 1980 to 1982.

== Early life ==
He was the son of Murrell Williams Talbot (Merle), a forester and ecologist, and colleague in the 1920s of Aldo Leopold, and his wife Zenaida Merriam, daughter of Clinton Hart Merriam, an ethnologist and naturalist. His father had a career in the Bureau of Plant Industry and Forest Service, becoming an associate director of the California Forest Experiment Station set up in 1926 at the University of California, Berkeley (later the Pacific Southwest Research Station); and was a consultant to the Charles Lathrop Pack Forestry Foundation on watershed management.

After a year at the Smithsonian Institution as Resident Ecologist in 1948–9, Talbot was at Deep Springs College in 1951. He graduated Associate of Arts at the University of California, Berkeley in 1951, and A.B. there in 1953. He then served in South Korea, after the Korean War, in the United States Marine Corps.

== Ecologist ==
In 1954 Talbot was appointed Staff Ecologist of the Survival Service Commission of the IUCN, a post he held to 1956. There was a particular focus on rangeland management. In his first year, Talbot made a trip stretching from Africa and Indonesia, researching animals such as the Arabian oryx, Indian rhinoceros and Asiatic lion; he visited around 30 countries over the period. A 1960 report by Talbot on the plight of the oryx, for the Fauna Preservation Society, led to action on 1963 by the Society to preserve the species in captivity. In 1955 Hal Coolidge of the IUPN asked Talbot to visit colonial Tanganyika, to investigate whether the Ngorongoro Highlands were to be excluded from the Serengeti National Park. This turning out to be the case, Talbot wrote a paper for the British Colonial Secretary, Anthony Greenwood. An ecological study was arranged, backed by the Fauna Preservation Society, and carried out by William Pearsall.

Talbot met with Paul Brooks of Houghton Mifflin in the fall of 1955. At the meeting Brooks, having been prompted by a book proposal from Rachel Carson raised the issue of the environmental impact of pesticides; and Talbot gave him some history of the concerns of the IUPN (as the IUCN then was) about it going back to their 1949 meeting at Lake Success. Carson's celebrated book, Silent Spring, appeared in 1962.

From 1959 when he married, to 1963, with breaks, Talbot was running an ecological project in East Africa, with his wife Marty. They were centrally interested in wildebeest, and used a "capture gun", a type of dart gun, to make studies that included tissue samples and parasites. While there Talbot was involved via Nick Arundel in discussions that led to the African Wildlife Foundation. He also helped convene the 1961 Arusha Conference at which game wardens discussed anti-poaching. They indicated the wildlife trade as a driver, and Talbot took that conclusion forward to the IUCM.

In 1965 Sidney Dillon Ripley hired Talbot to work for the Smithsonian Institution on its activities in international conservation, Marty Talbot also getting a research post. The Talbots worked in 1967 with the filmmaker Des Bartlett. From 1968 Talbot worked under Helmut Karl Buechner at the Smithsonian's Office of Ecology. In 1970, with David Challinor and Francis Raymond Fosberg, Talbot was involved in research on the Mekong Delta and the ecological impact of dams and irrigation.

== Government scientist ==
The Council on Environmental Quality was created in 1970 by the National Environmental Policy Act. Russell Train, its first chair, recruited Talbot as one of its main advisers. He then worked towards the 1972 United Nations Conference on the Human Environment in Stockholm, and made sure that endangered species were considered, with the World Heritage Convention also endorsed by the United States. At the conference that preceded CITES, Talbot worked closely with Nathaniel Reed, and together they used that experience to contribute to the drafting of the Endangered Species Act of 1973.

The neologism "sustainability" in the broad ecological sense dates from that period, variously attributed to the Stockholm conference, to Thomas Sowell discussing Say's law, or (in the German language) to the Swiss civil engineer Ernst Basler (see de:wikt:Nachhaltigkeit). Talbot used it in a speech in 1980. The editors of Foundations of Environmental Sustainability (2008) wrote:

Lee Talbot's career marks, and substantially helped to bring about, the transition from the concept of conservation to the concept of sustainability.

== Later life ==
Talbot was chosen Director-General of the IUCN in 1980, over Don McMichael and Adrian Phillips who was the IUCN Director of Programmes. He was met by immediate financial troubles. These he met by an outside audit and retrenchment, with voluntary reductions in senior staff, and by prioritizing the Conservation for Development Centre. He also sought external governmental funding.

In later life, Talbot was an academic at George Mason University, from about 1992.

== Works ==
- A Look at Threatened Species (1960)
- The Wildebeest in Western Masailand, East Africa (1963), with Martha Talbot
- Conservation of the Hong Kong Countryside (1965), report with Martha Talbot. In 1965 Talbot and his wife were working for the International Commission on National Parks.
- The Meat Production Potential of Wild Animals in Africa: A Review of Biological Knowledge (1965), Commonwealth Agricultural Bureaux
- Wild Animals as a Source of Food (1966)
- Conservation in Tropical South East Asia: Proceedings (1968), editor with Martha Talbot
- Man, Beast and the Land, NBC-TV film (1968); an account by Lee and Martha Talbot of their ecological studies in the Serengeti National Park.
- To Feed the Earth: Agro-ecology for Sustainable Development (1987) with Michael J. Dover, for the World Resources Institute.
- Biological Diversity and Forests, with Daniel Botkin, in Narendra P. Sharma (ed.), Managing the World's Forests: Looking for Balance Between Conservation and Development (1992). This was a World Bank paper from 1991.

== Family ==
Talbot married on 16 May 1959 Martha Hayne (Marty), daughter of Francis Bourn Hayne and his wife Anna Walcott. She was founder with Elizabeth Cushman of the Student Conservation Association, had graduated from Vassar College in 1954, and had gone to work for the National Parks Association. The couple had met at the Sierra Club. They had two sons, Lawrence and Russell Merriam.
