= Martha Hayne Talbot =

American conservationist, writer, ecologist, biologist

Marty Hayne Talbot
- Born: August 3, 1932 (age 93); San Francisco, California, United States
- Education: Vassar College
- Spouse: Lee Merriam Talbot
- Children: Russell Merriam Talbot and Lawrence Hayne Talbot

Martha (Marty) Hayne Talbot (born August 3, 1932) is an American conservation activist, biologist, author, ecologist and co-founder of the Student Conservation Association. She is also an active participant on Boards of scientific, environmental and community organisations.

== Early life ==
Martha Hayne was born in San Francisco, California, United States, the daughter of Francis Bourn Hayne and his wife Anna Walcott. She attended the Katharine Branson School and graduated Vassar College, in 1954 with a Bachelor of Arts. While she was at Vassar, she helped her friend Elizabeth Cushman respond to minatory remarks by Bernard DeVoto on the state of the US National Parks. Cushman first wrote a senior thesis on the maintenance issue for the parks system and youth service. Then the two set up the Student Conservation Association, with funding from the National Parks Association.

== Career ==
After college, went to work for the National Parks Association. For the first six years of her marriage, from 1959, she worked with her husband Lee Talbot on the ecology of the East African plains. They then traveled very widely for several years, backpacking in a number of tropical areas. Marty Talbot went on to conduct environmental research in more than 60 countries.

Talbot has served as President of the Society of Women Geographers, Vice President of Rachel Carson Council, part of Rachel's Network Council and Director of the Student Conservation Association, which she co-founded.

Talbot has co-written and edited six books and monographs and she has spoken at conferences in Africa, Asia, Europe, Latin and North America. She has been accredited for her services to conservation and scientific research both nationally and internationally, pioneering in organic viticulture.

== Honors and awards ==
- Recipient, CINE Golden Eagle Award, Documentary Film, 1968 or 1969
- Inductee, Worldwide Lifetime Achievement, 2016

== Family ==
Martha Hayne married the ecologist Lee Merriam Talbot on May 16, 1959; and they had two children: Lawrence and Russell Merriam.
