= Steven Takiff =

American mathematician

Steven Joel Takiff
- Education: University of Illinois at Urbana-Champaign
- Scientific career
- Fields: Mathematics
- Workplaces: Michigan State University
- Doctoral advisor: R. Ranga Rao

Steven Joel Takiff is an American mathematician who introduced what became Takiff algebras in 1971.

== Publications ==
- Takiff, S. J. (1971), "Rings of invariant polynomials for a class of Lie algebras", Transactions of the American Mathematical Society, 160: 249–262, doi:10.2307/1995803, ISSN 0002-9947, JSTOR 1995803, MR 0281839
- Takiff, S. J. (1972), "Invariant Polynomials on Lie algebras of Inhomogeneous Unitary and Special Orthogonal Groups", Transactions of the American Mathematical Society, 170: 221–230, doi:10.2307/1996305, ISSN 0002-9947, JSTOR 1995803, MR 0281839
