= Napkin PC =

The Napkin PC is a concept for a next-generation computer entered into the 2009 Next-Gen PC Design Competition by Avery Holleman. The concept won first prize, the Chairman's Award. The award was personally presented to Holleman by Microsoft founder Bill Gates. Holleman received $20,000 in prize money for the accolade.

There is currently no plan to build the device; it remains a concept. The technology is based on current technologies, like e-paper and radio frequency.

== Design ==
A "napkin" holder functions as a base-station for the technology. The base-station is filled with e-paper "napkins", as well as a place for some coloured pens. The user can simply pick up a pen and interact with the napkin using the pen. The napkin and pen communicate using short-range RF technology, while both connect with the base-station using long-range RF waves.

Holleman has also stated that the napkins can easily be shared. The napkins are also modular. The pen wirelessly powers the napkin when it comes into close range.

== Production ==
Images of the concept released by Holleman show the device running a variant of Windows.

Holleman hopes that the Napkin PC will encourage creative groups to collaborate better because of the conference abilities of the concept.

The device will require very little power. It will rely on not a battery, but a single-layer flexible circuit board for inductive power. Holleman also hopes that the device will help cut down on paper waste and reduce the need for printers in modern society.
