= Howard Gobioff =

American computer scientist

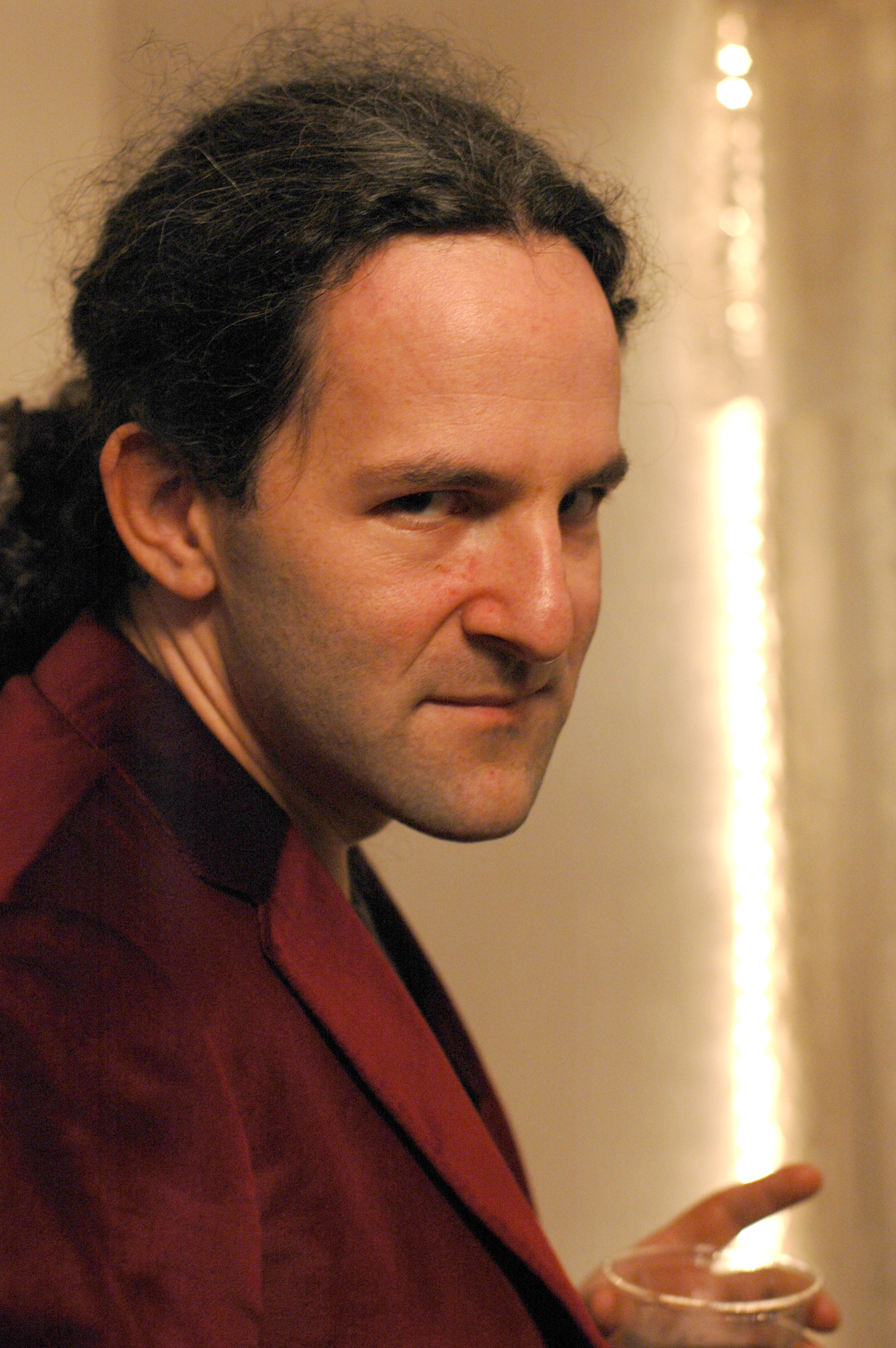
- Born: 1971
- Died: 2008 (aged 36)
- Scientific career
- Fields: Computer science
- Institutions: Google

Howard Gobioff (1971 – 2008) was an American computer scientist and software engineer. He was one of the architects of the Google File System and a co-author of the 2003 paper "The Google File System". At Google, he worked on advertising, crawling, and indexing systems, and later led the company's Tokyo research and development center. He died from lymphoma in 2008.

== Education ==
Gobioff graduated from the University of Maryland, College Park, where he studied computer science and mathematics. He later earned a PhD in computer science from Carnegie Mellon University, where he worked on the Network-Attached Secure Disks project.

== Career ==
In 1999, Gobioff joined Google, which was then a 40-person startup. As a software engineer, he worked on the company's advertising system and its crawling and indexing systems. In 2004, as an engineering director, he launched and led Google's Tokyo research and development center.

Gobioff was named as a co-inventor on 11 U.S. patents, many of which were related to distributed file systems, data replication, namespace locking, record append operations, garbage collection, and search engine crawling.

=== Google File System ===
Gobioff was one of the architects of the Google File System, a distributed file system developed by Google for large-scale data processing. With Sanjay Ghemawat and Shun-Tak Leung, he co-authored "The Google File System", a 2003 paper that described the system's design, measurements, and use in production at Google.

Apache Hadoop's MapReduce and Hadoop Distributed File System components were originally derived respectively from Google's MapReduce and Google File System papers. Using the Google File System and MapReduce, or the Hadoop Distributed File System and MapReduce, a project can perform a computation over 300 Tbytes of data using 1,000 nodes, which previously would have been unachievable for most projects.

== Gobioff Foundation ==
Gobioff founded the Gobioff Foundation in 2007. After his death, the foundation continued to support arts and human rights initiatives, including arts microgrants in the Tampa Bay area.

In 2014, the Gobioff Foundation joined a team of Florida grantmakers led by the Florida Philanthropic Network on Capitol Hill to meet with Florida's congressional delegation to discuss local philanthropic efforts and related legislative and public policy issues. These meetings were part of the annual Foundations on the Hill event organized by the Forum of Regional Associations of Grantmakers, in partnership with the Council on Foundations and the Alliance for Charitable Reform.
