= Takiff algebra =

In mathematics, a Takiff algebra is a Lie algebra over a truncated polynomial ring. More precisely, a Takiff algebra of a Lie algebra g over a field k is a Lie algebra of the form g[x]/(x^{n+1}) = g⊗_{k}k[x]/(x^{n+1}) for some positive integer n. Sometimes these are called generalized Takiff algebras, and the name Takiff algebra is used for the case when n = 1. These algebras (for n = 1) were studied by Takiff (1971), who in some cases described the ring of polynomials on these algebras invariant under the action of the adjoint group.
