= Elizabeth Cushman Titus Putnam =

American conservationist

Elizabeth Titus Putnam
- Born: Elizabeth Cushman Titus Putnam; April 3, 1933 (age 93); Sands Point, New York
- Other name: Liz Putnam
- Occupation: Conservationist
- Years active: 1957-1990
- Known for: founding the Student Conservation Association

Elizabeth Cushman Titus Putnam is an American conservationist and founder of the Student Conservation Association.

== Early life and education ==
Putnam graduated from Miss Porter's School in 1952 and from Vassar in 1955.

=== Founding SCA ===
As a student at Vassar College in the 1950s, Putnam admired the natural heritage of America's national parks, but worried limited federal financial resources would prevent proper maintenance of the pristine parklands.

In 1955, Putnam wrote her senior thesis at Vassar College, "A Proposed Student Conservation Corps". The idea, modeled after the federal Civilian Conservation Corps program (1933–42), was to take the burden of labor-intensive jobs such as entrance fee collecting or trail work from the National Park Service and shift to the proposed SCC.

== Career ==
After founding the Student Conservation Association in 1957, Putnam served as its President until her retirement in 1990.

She currently resides in Shaftsbury, Vermont.

== Awards and honors ==
- In 2018, Vassar and the Hudson Valley chapter of the Student Conservation Association (SCA) planted a tree in her honor at the 415 acre Vassar Ecological Preserve.
- 2016 - The Wilderness Society's Robert Marshall Award
- 2015 - New York State Outdoor Education Association Leadership Award
- 2014 - Doctor of Humane Letters, College of Wooster
- 2012 - The Corps Network Lifetime Achievement
- In 2011, the Vermont legislature passed act R-107 to honor Putnam.
- In 2010, Putnam won the second highest civilian award, the Presidential Citizens Medal, from President Barack Obama, making her the first conservationist to win the honor.
- 1982 - President Reagan - President's Volunteer Action Award
- 1982 - Student Conservation Association - 25th Anniversary Award
- 1980 - Garden Club of America - Conservation Achievement Award
- 1974 - U.S. Department of the Interior - Distinguished Service Award
- 1971 - Arizona Federated Garden Clubs - Distinguished Service Award
- 1966 - Garden Club of America - Margaret Douglas Award

== Gallery of the Student Conservation Association at work - an organization founded by Putnam in 1957 ==
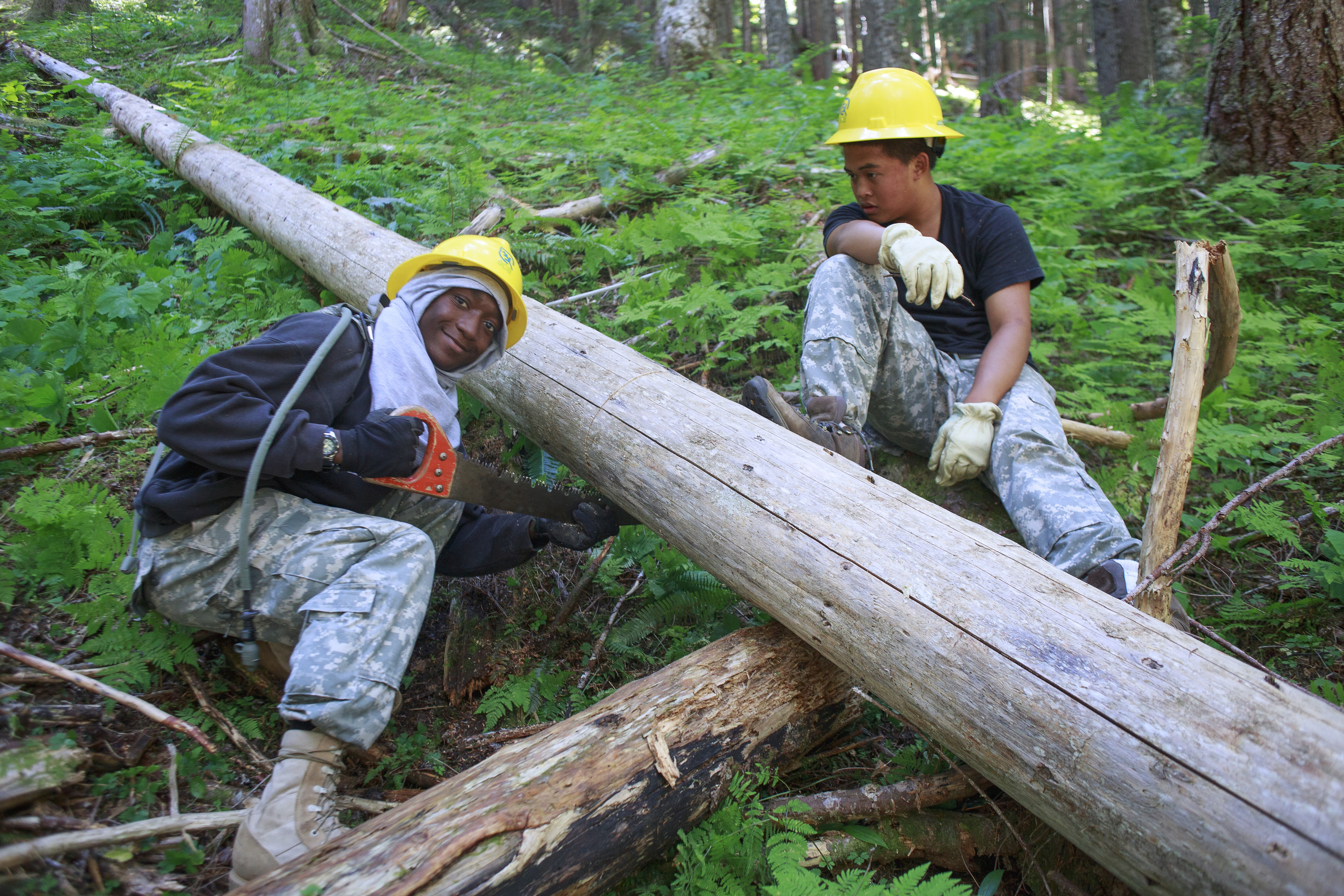

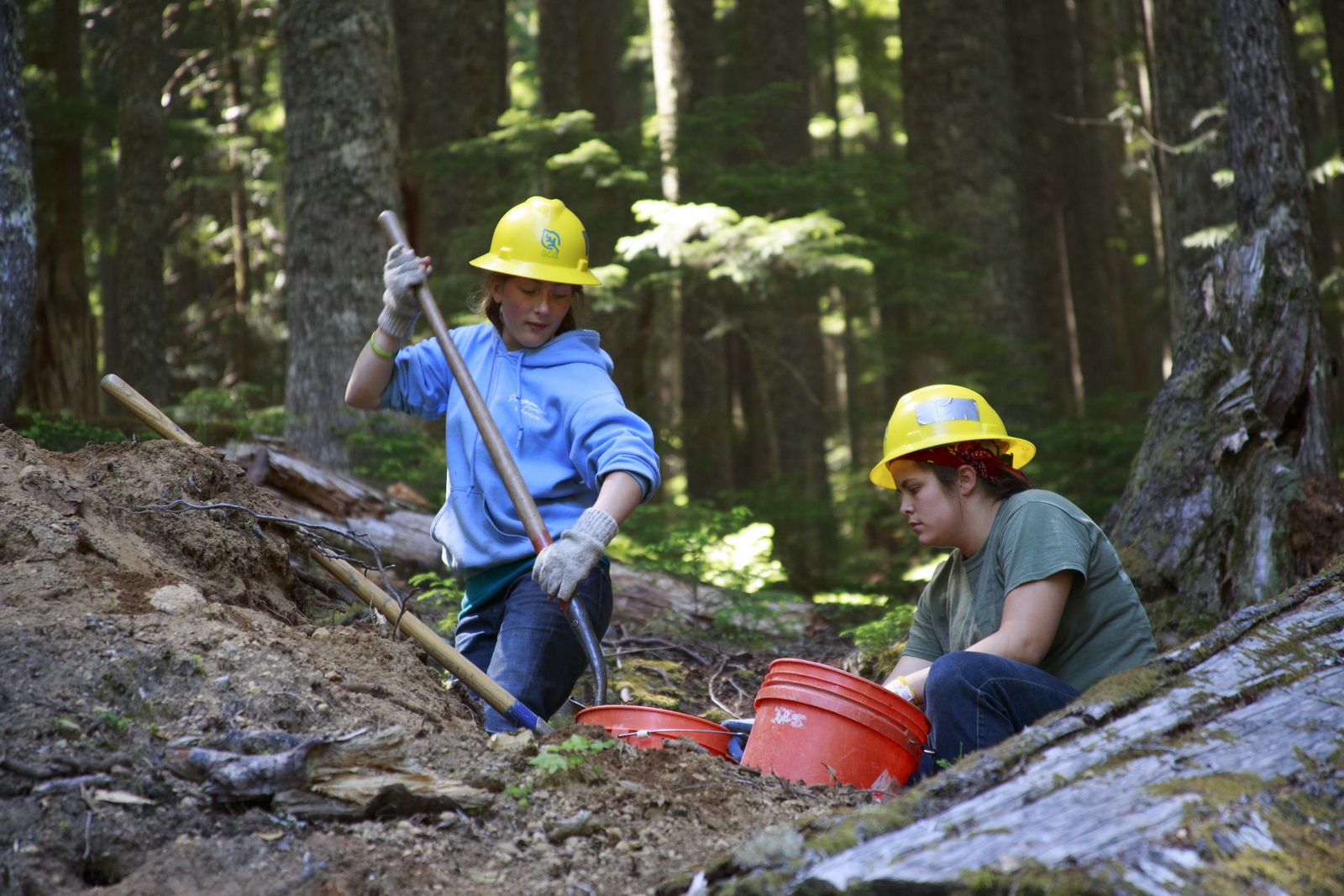

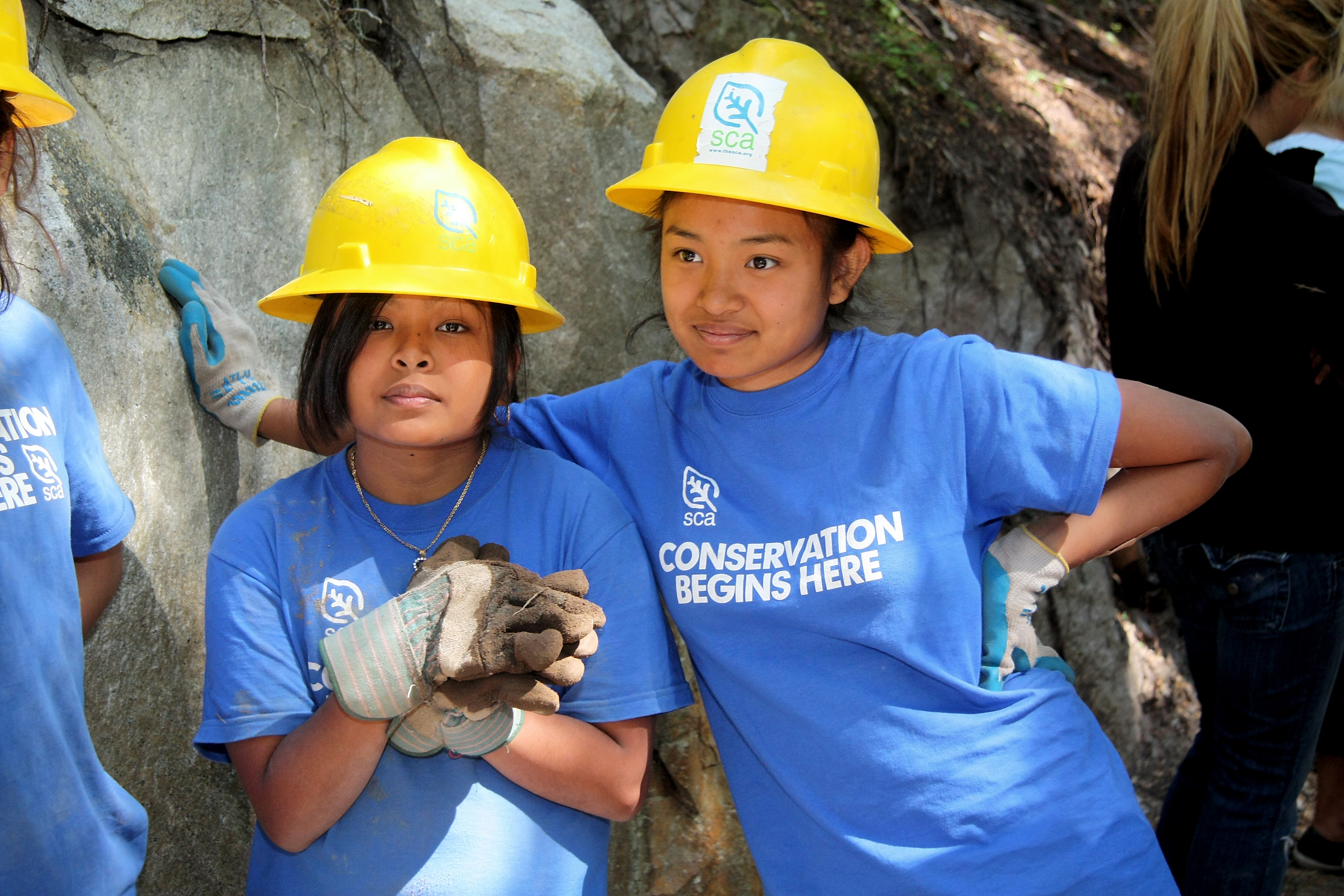

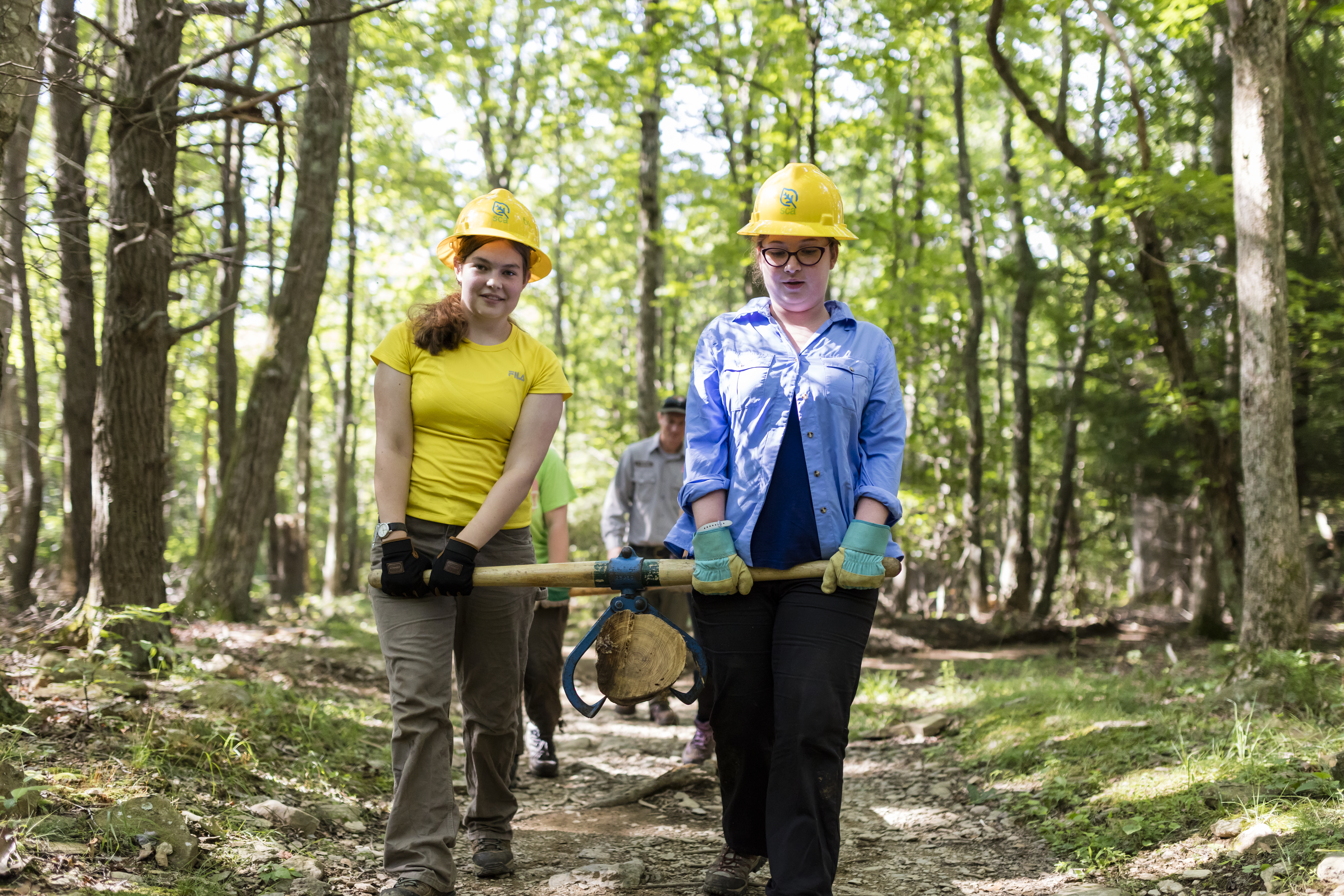

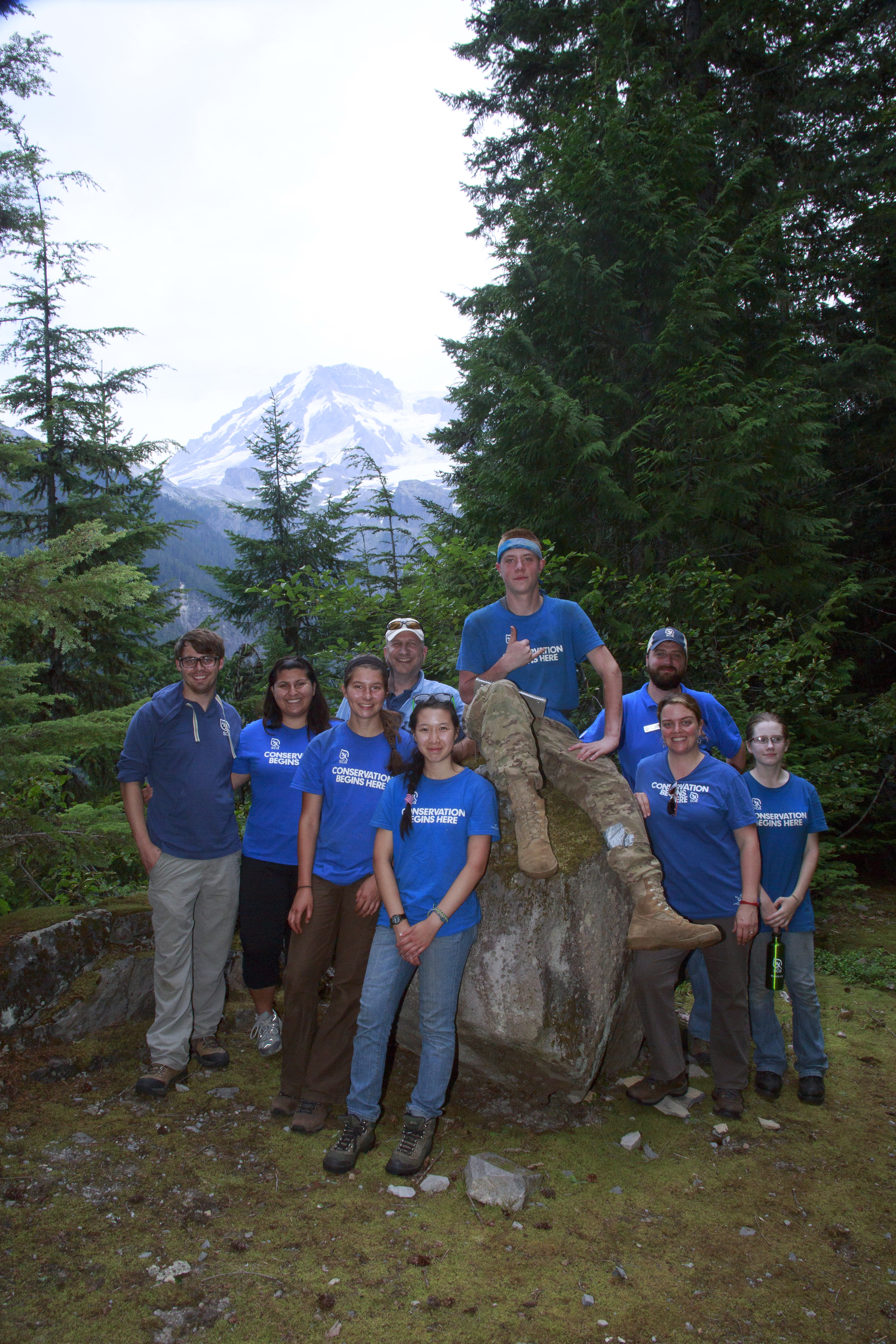

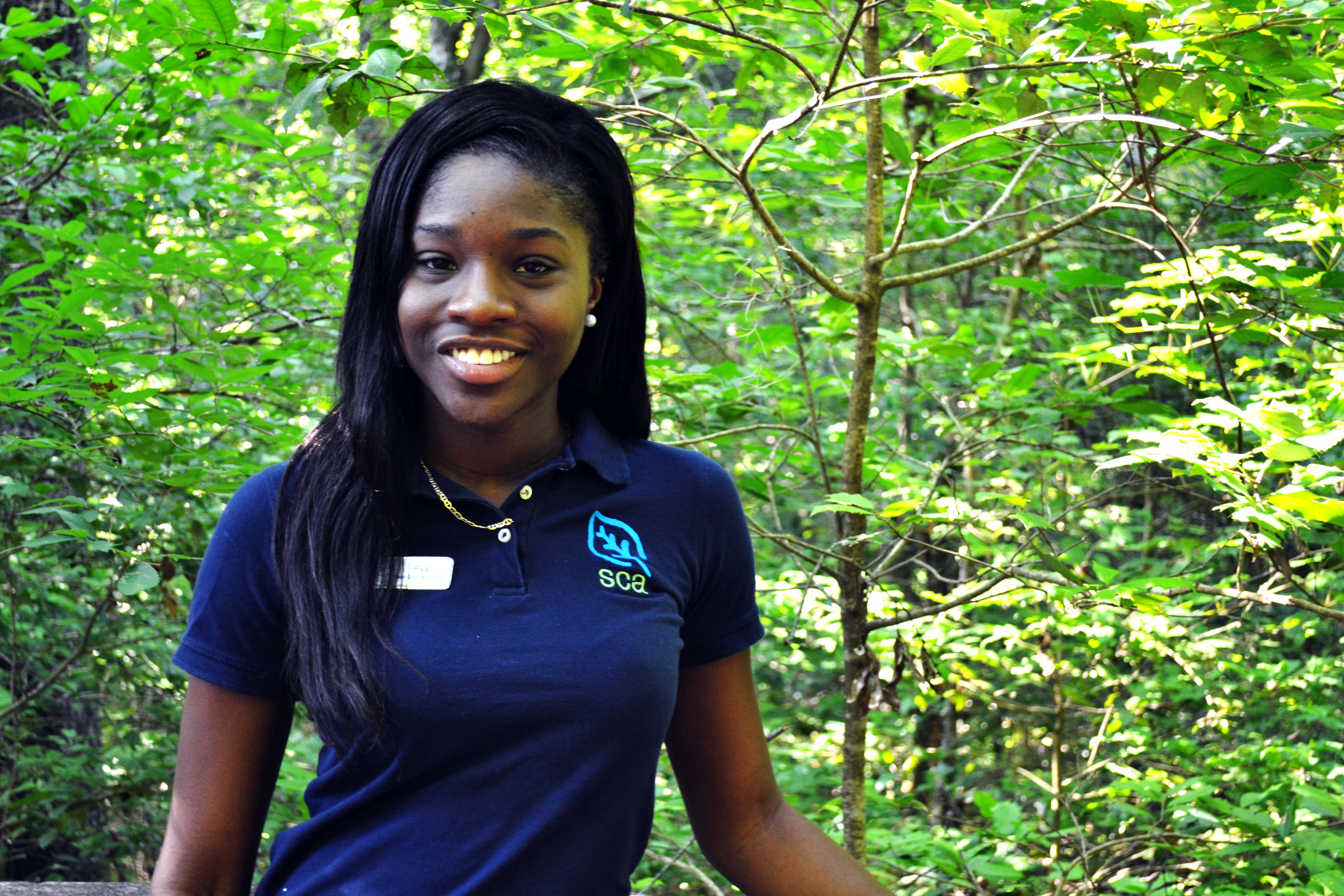

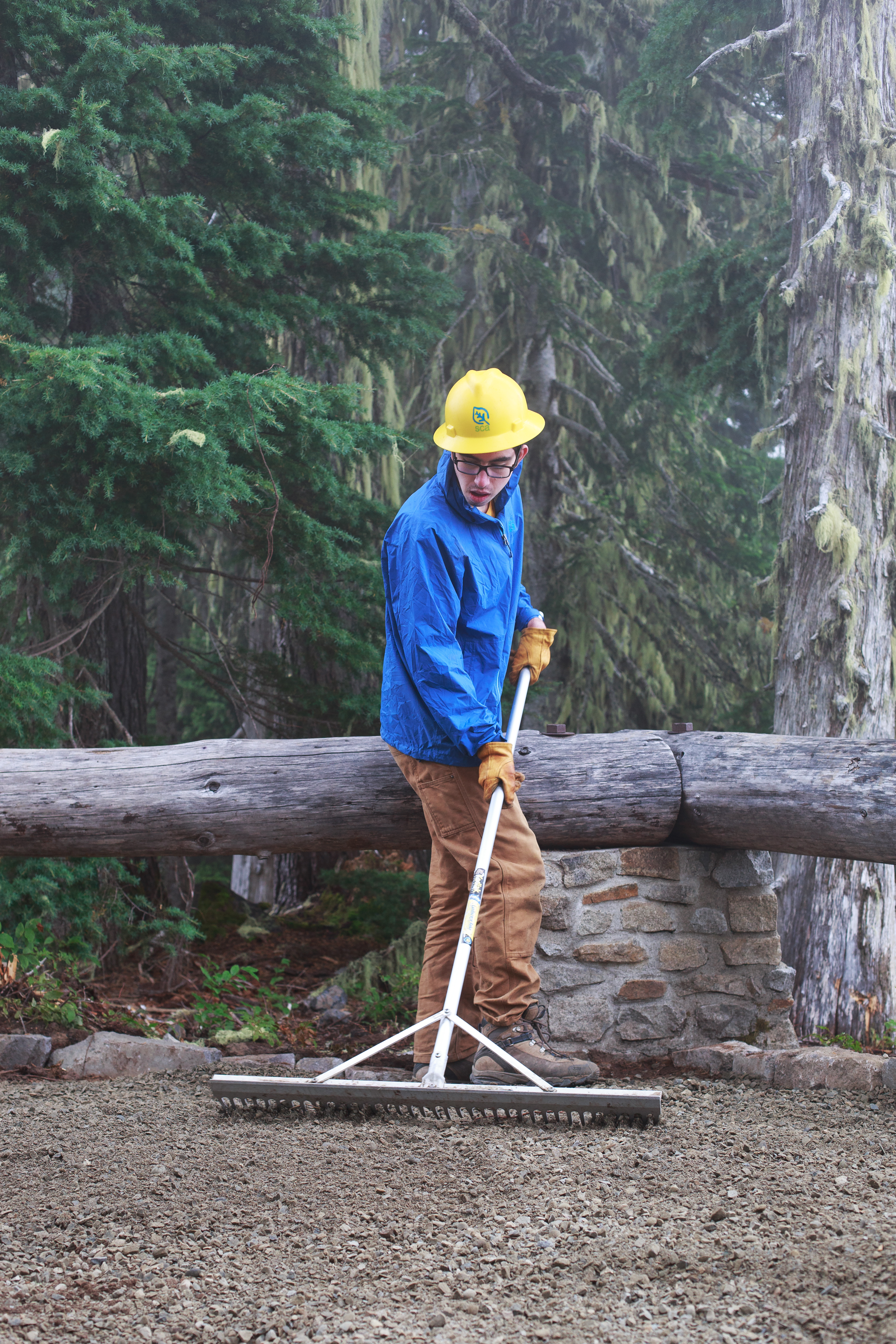

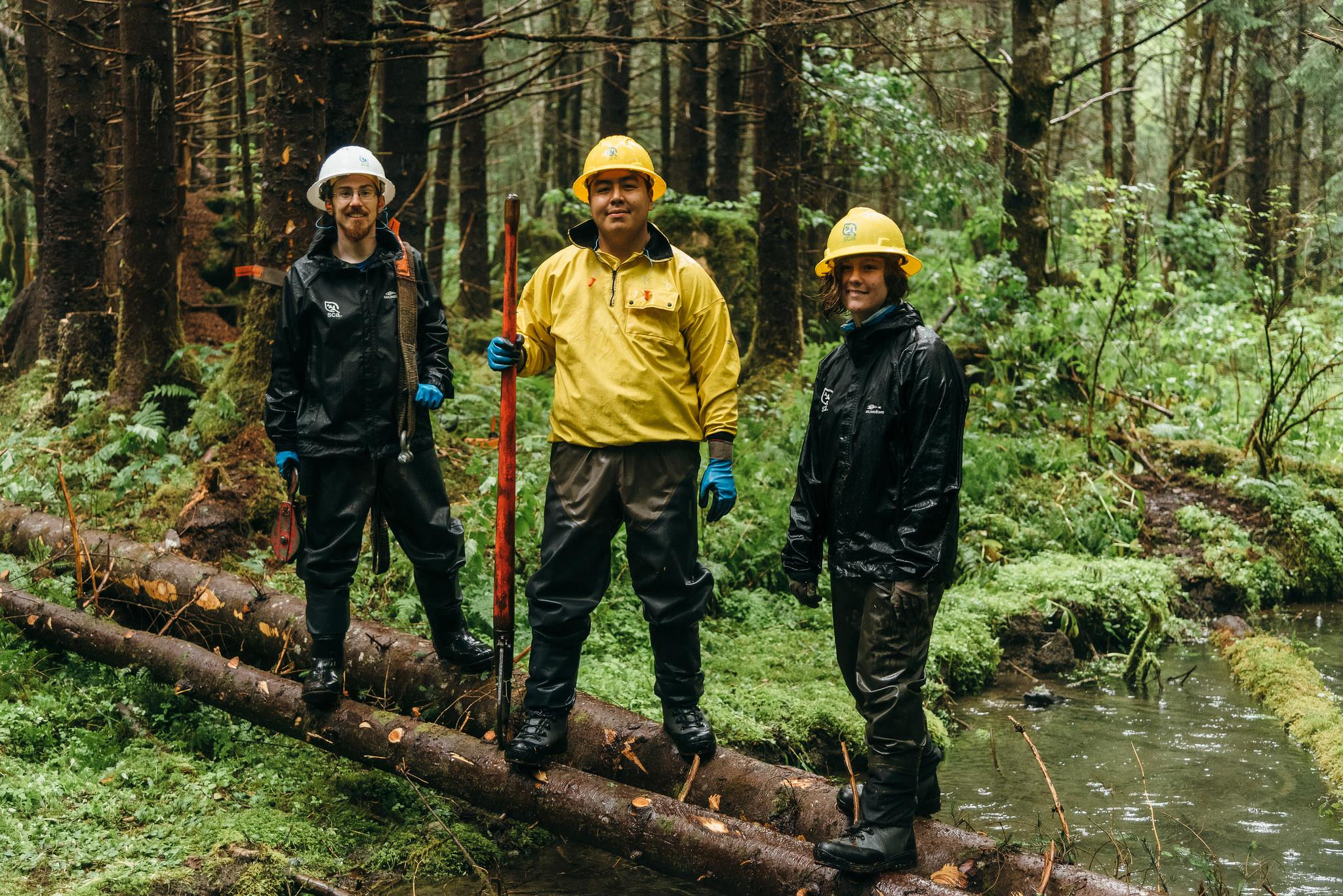

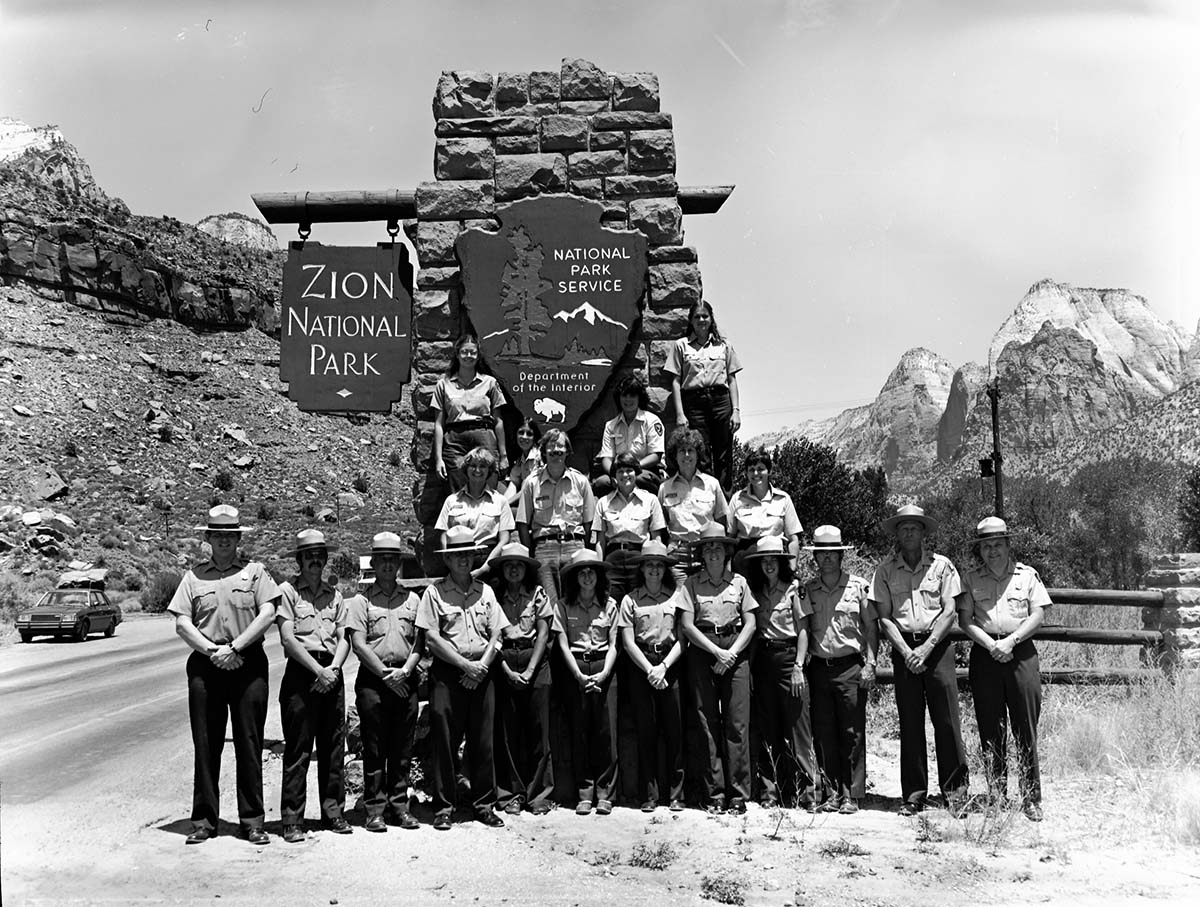

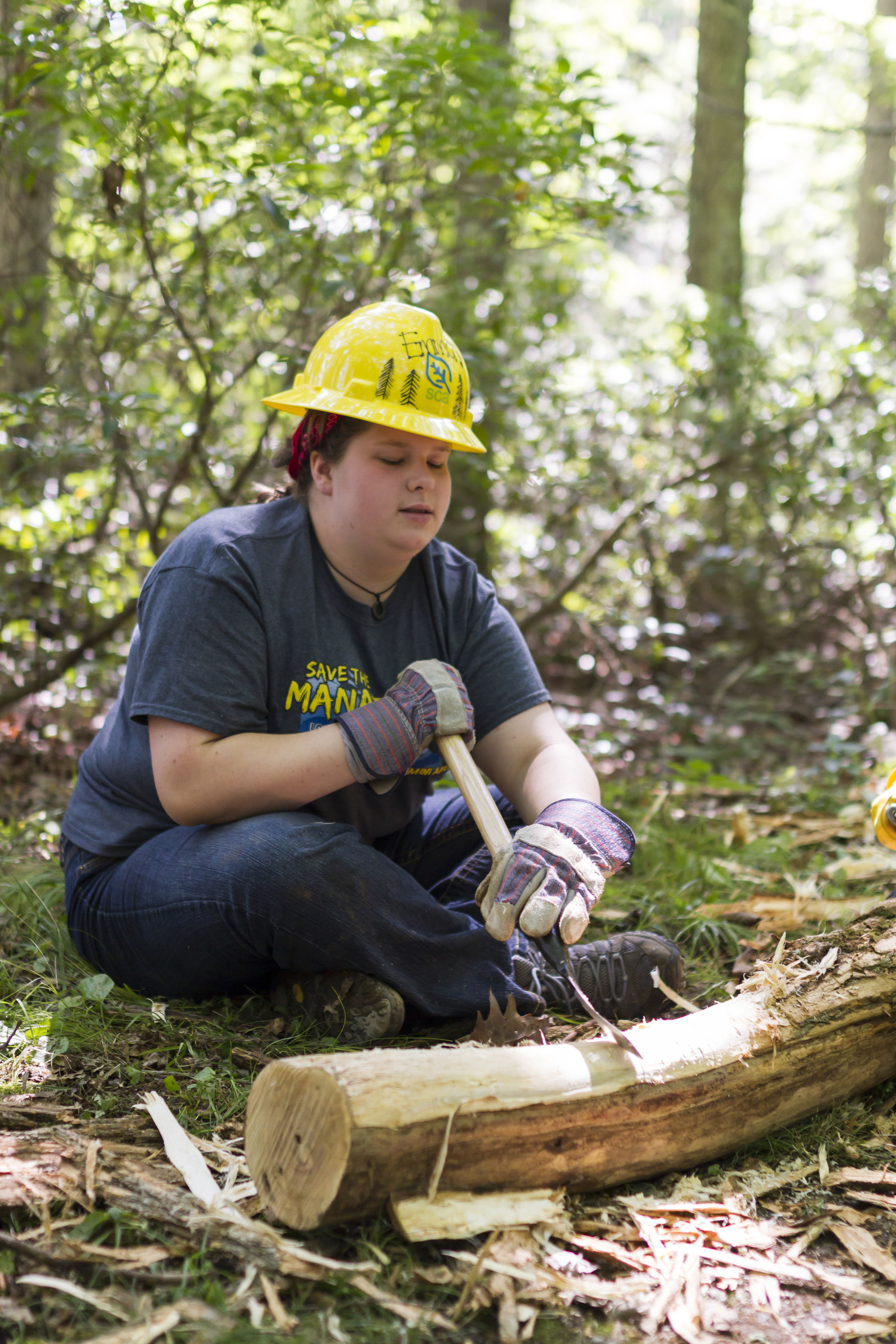

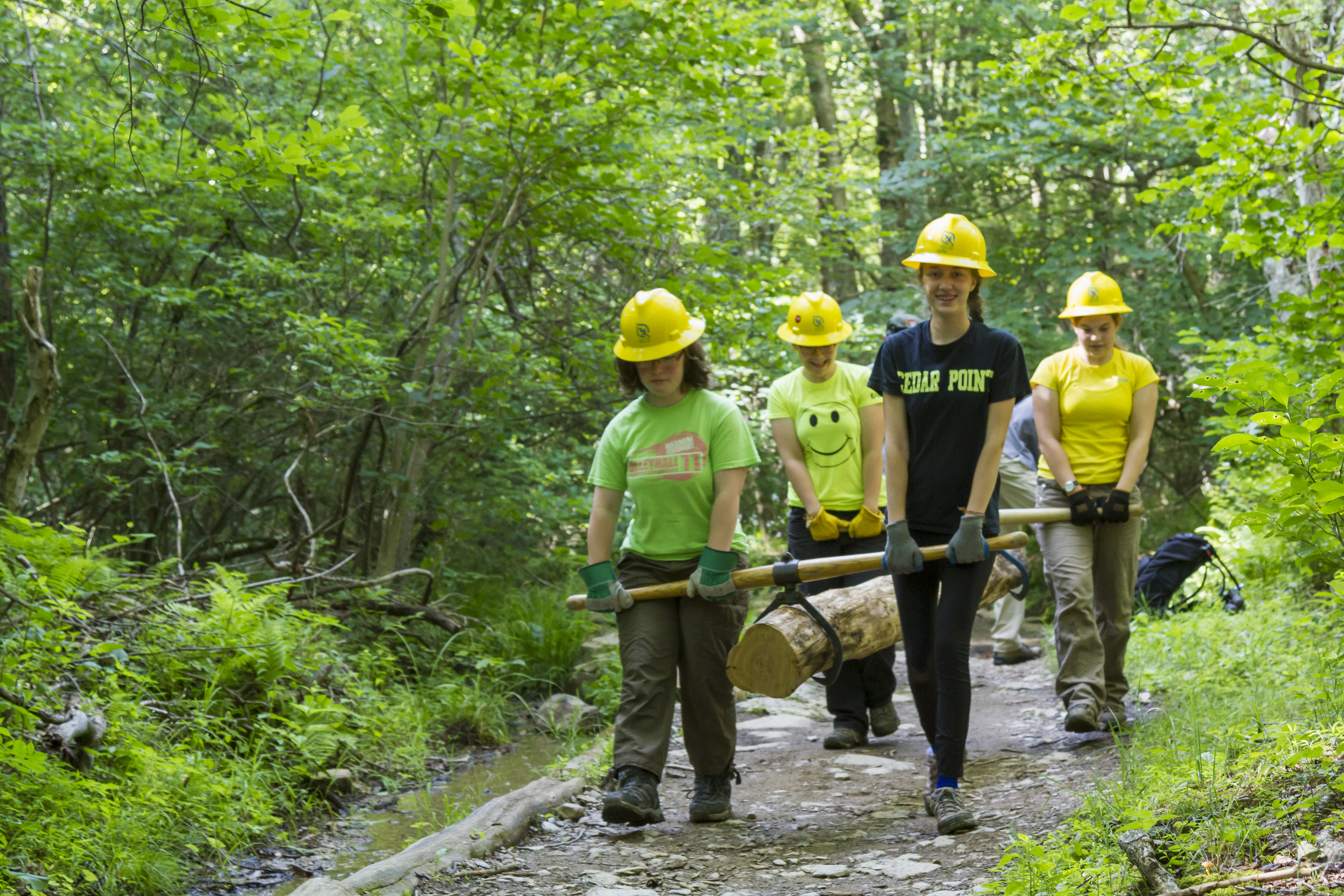

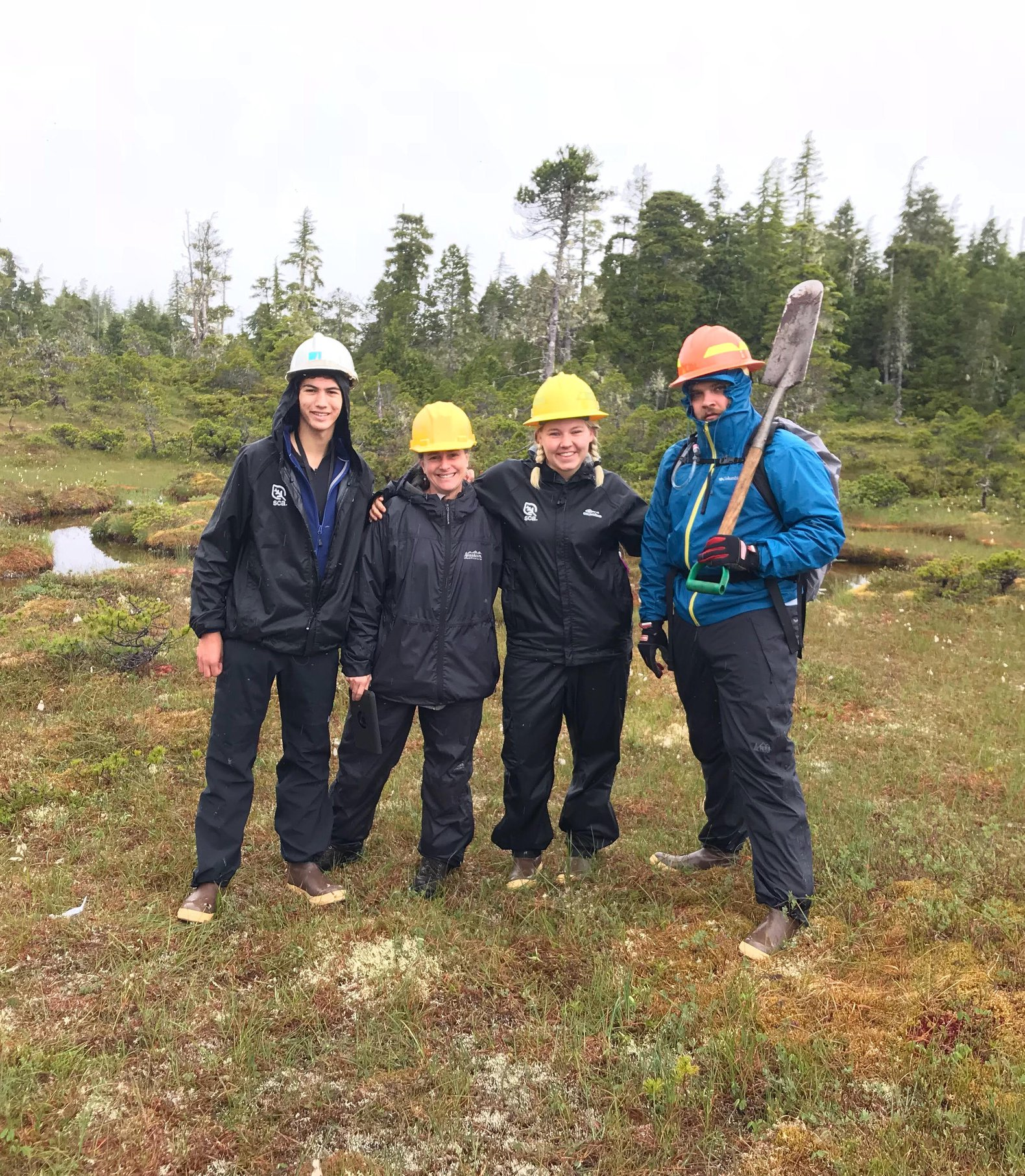

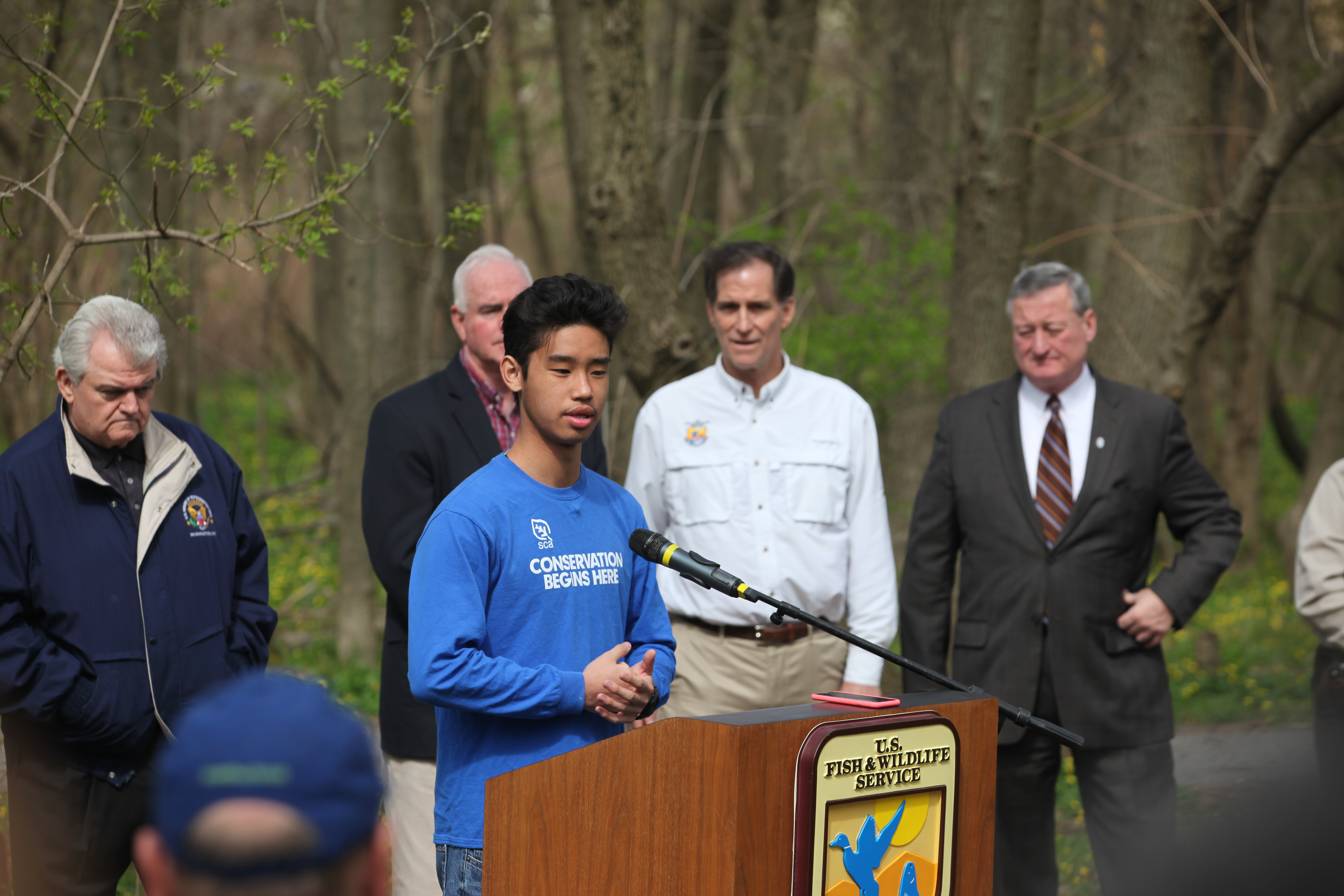

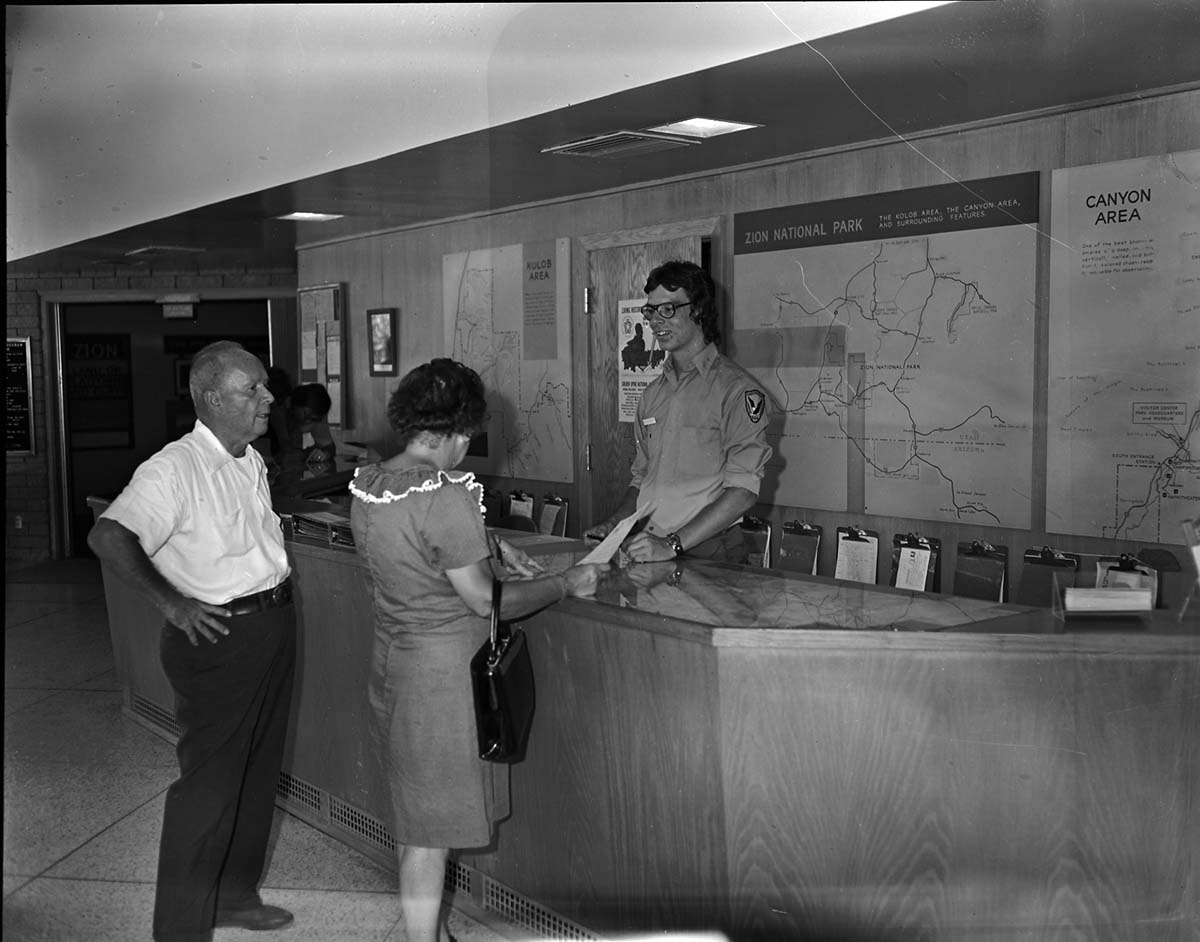

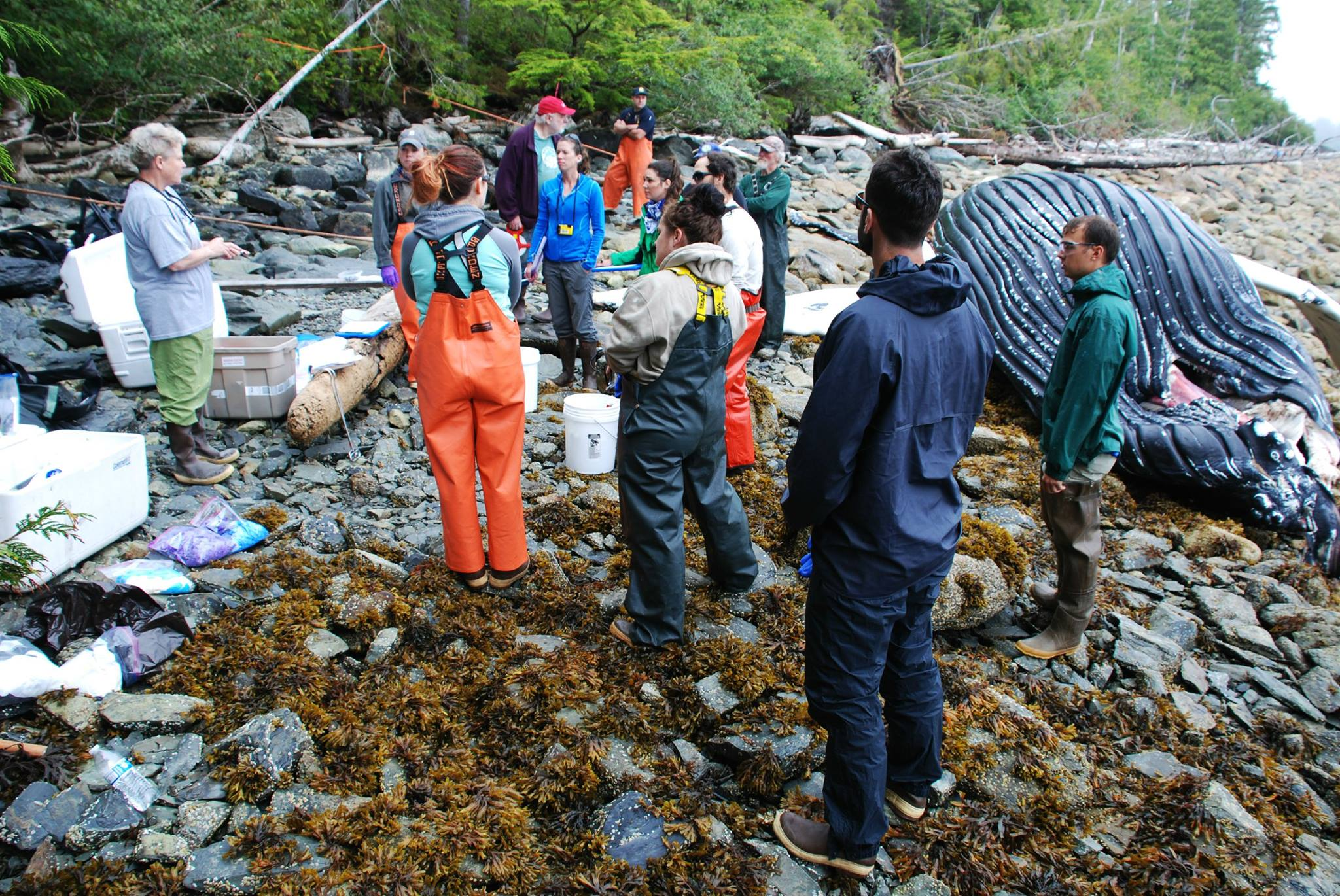

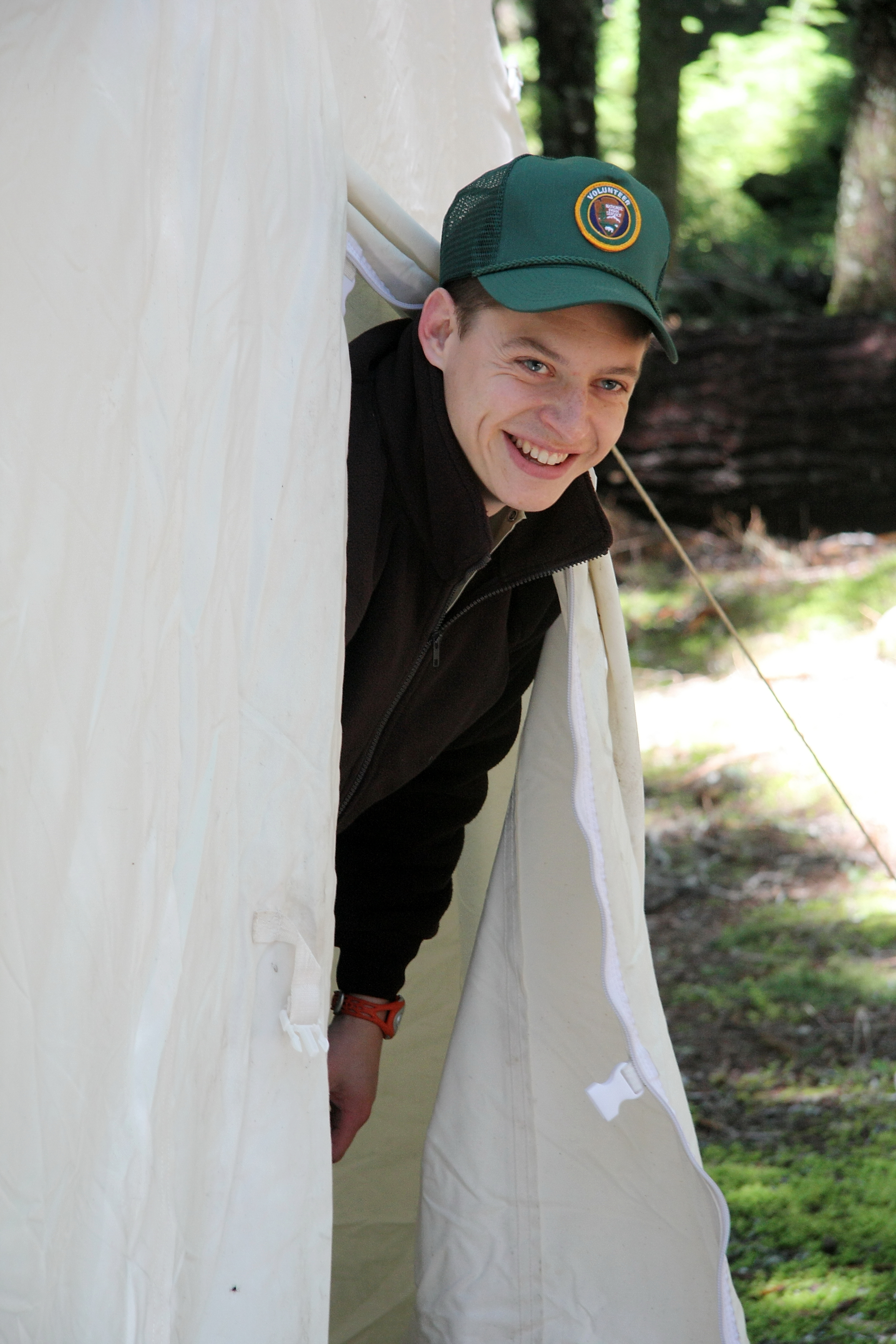

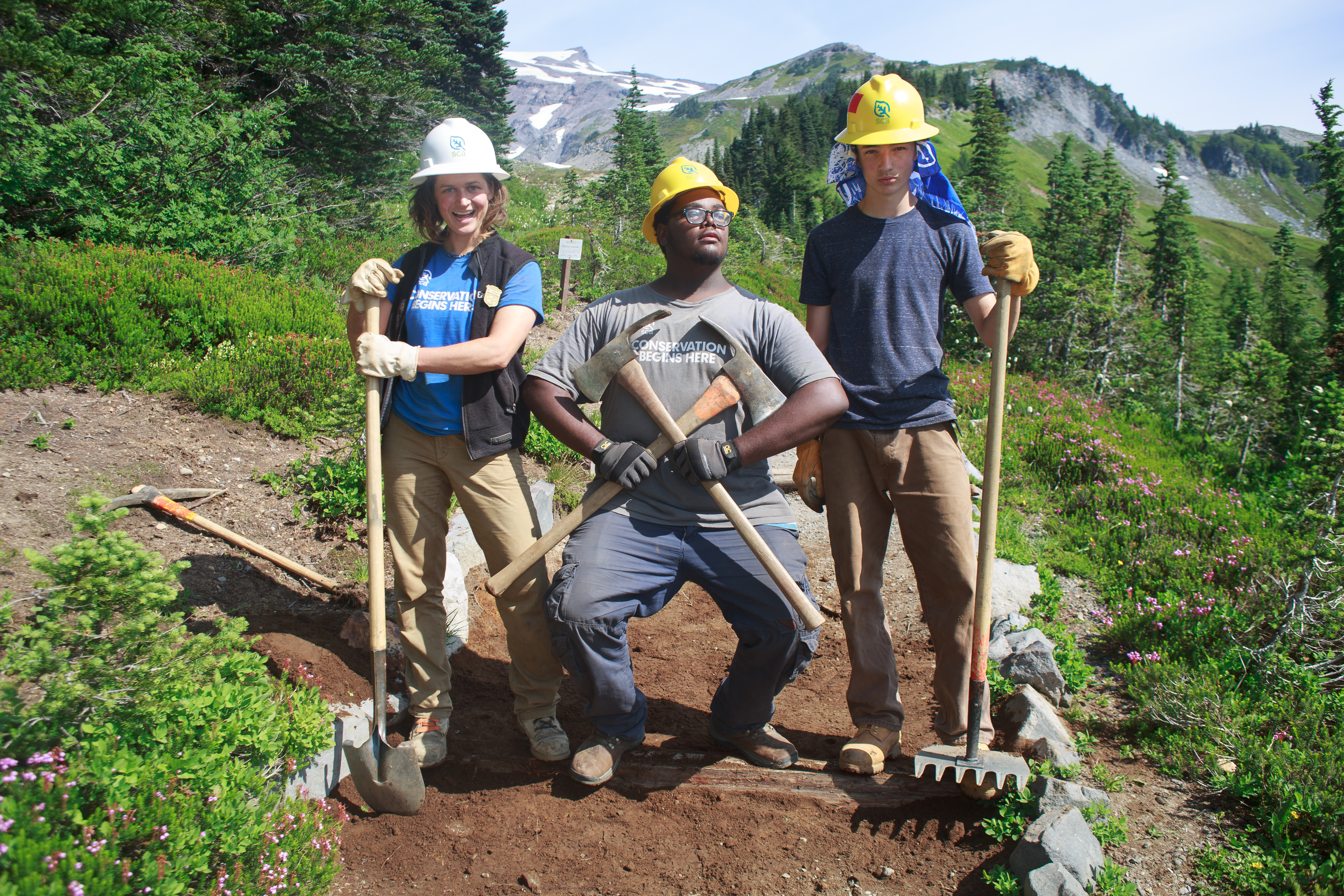

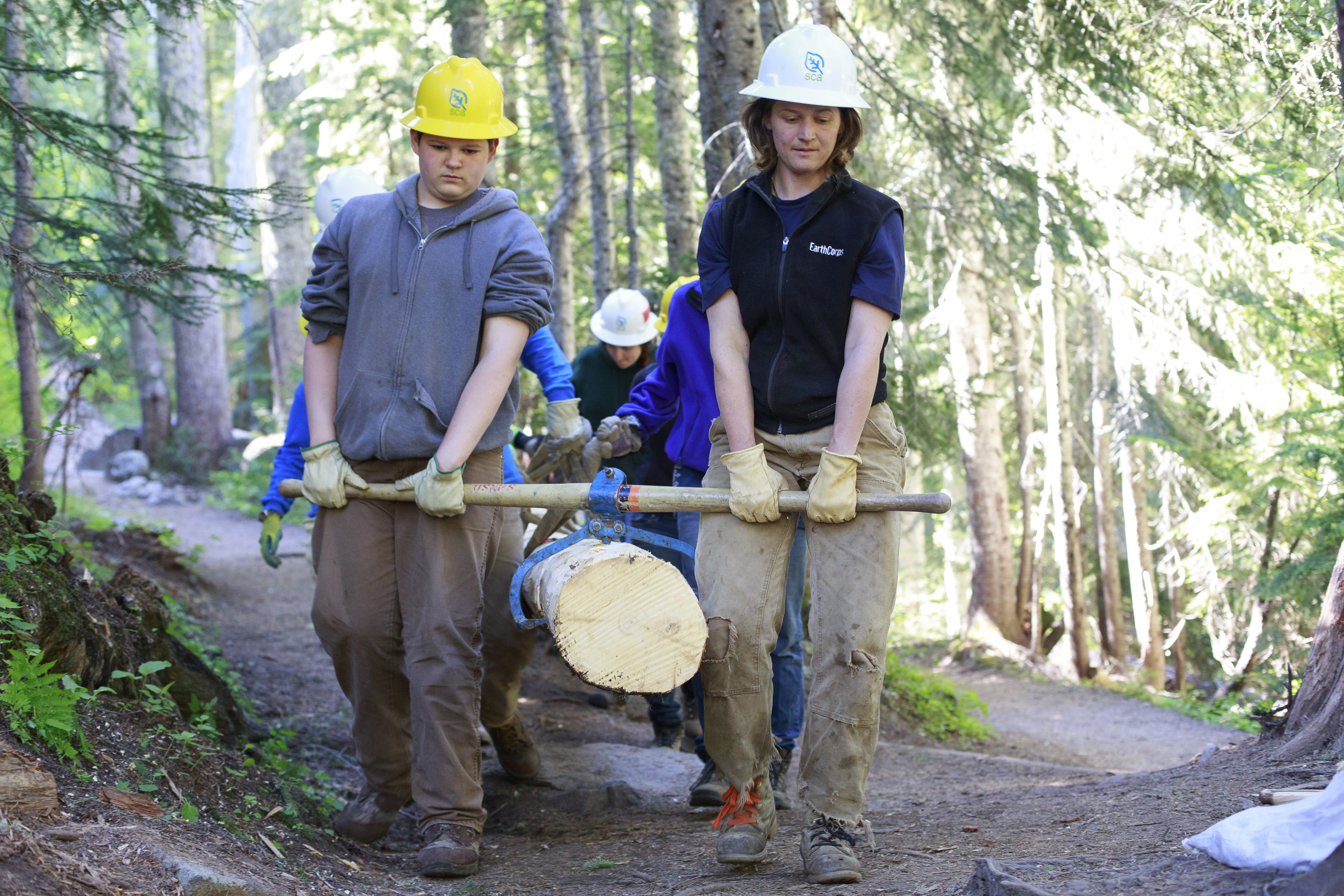

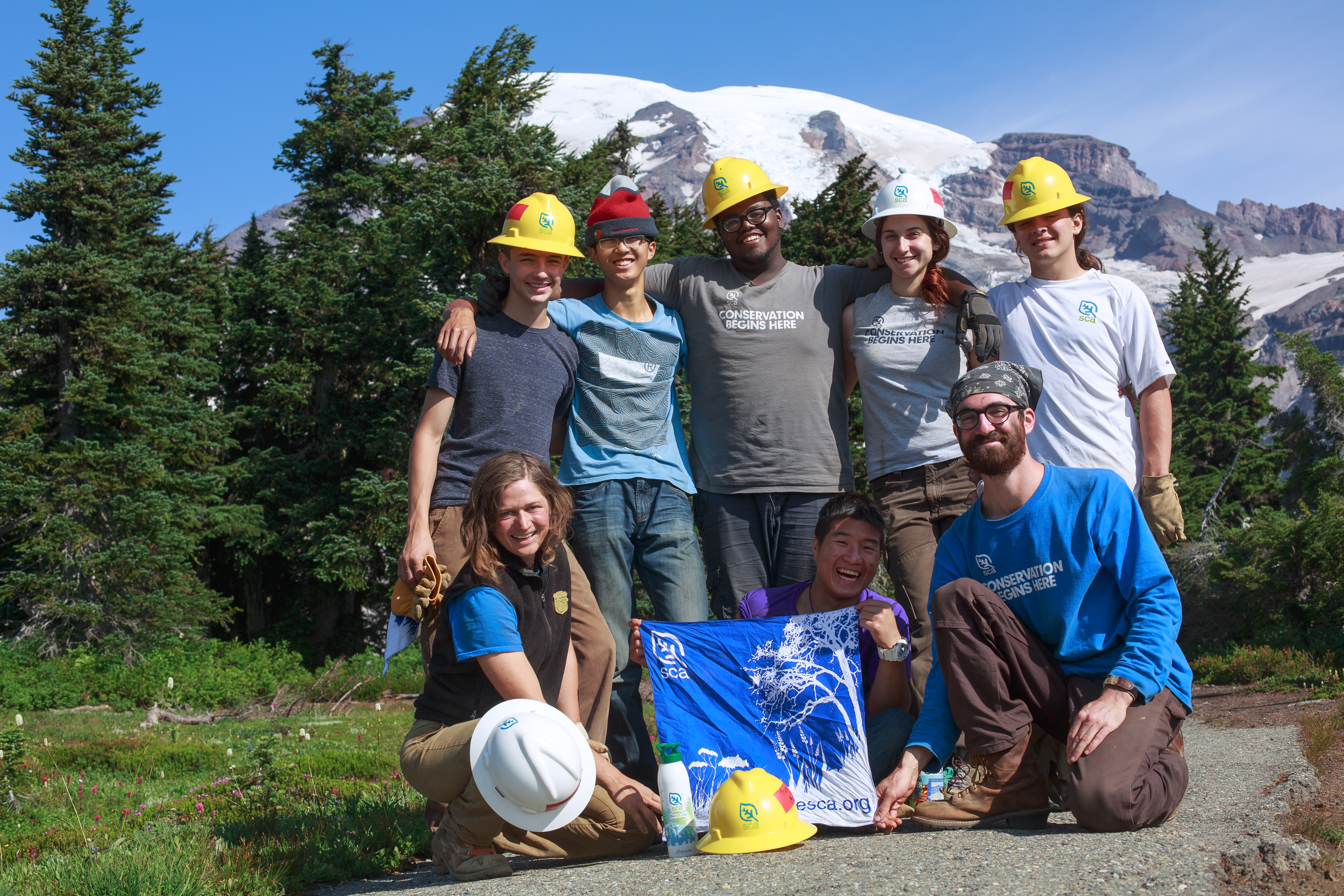

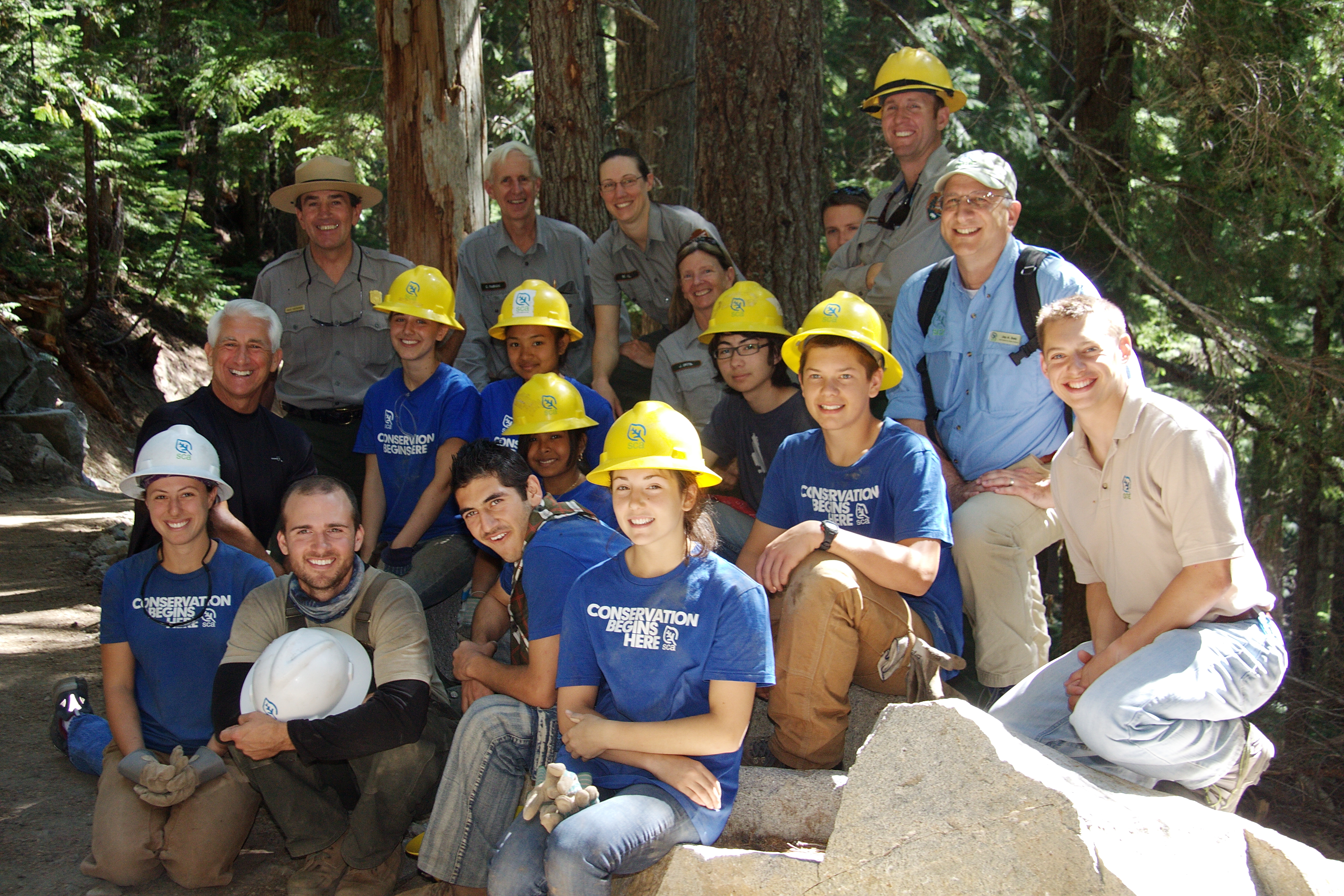

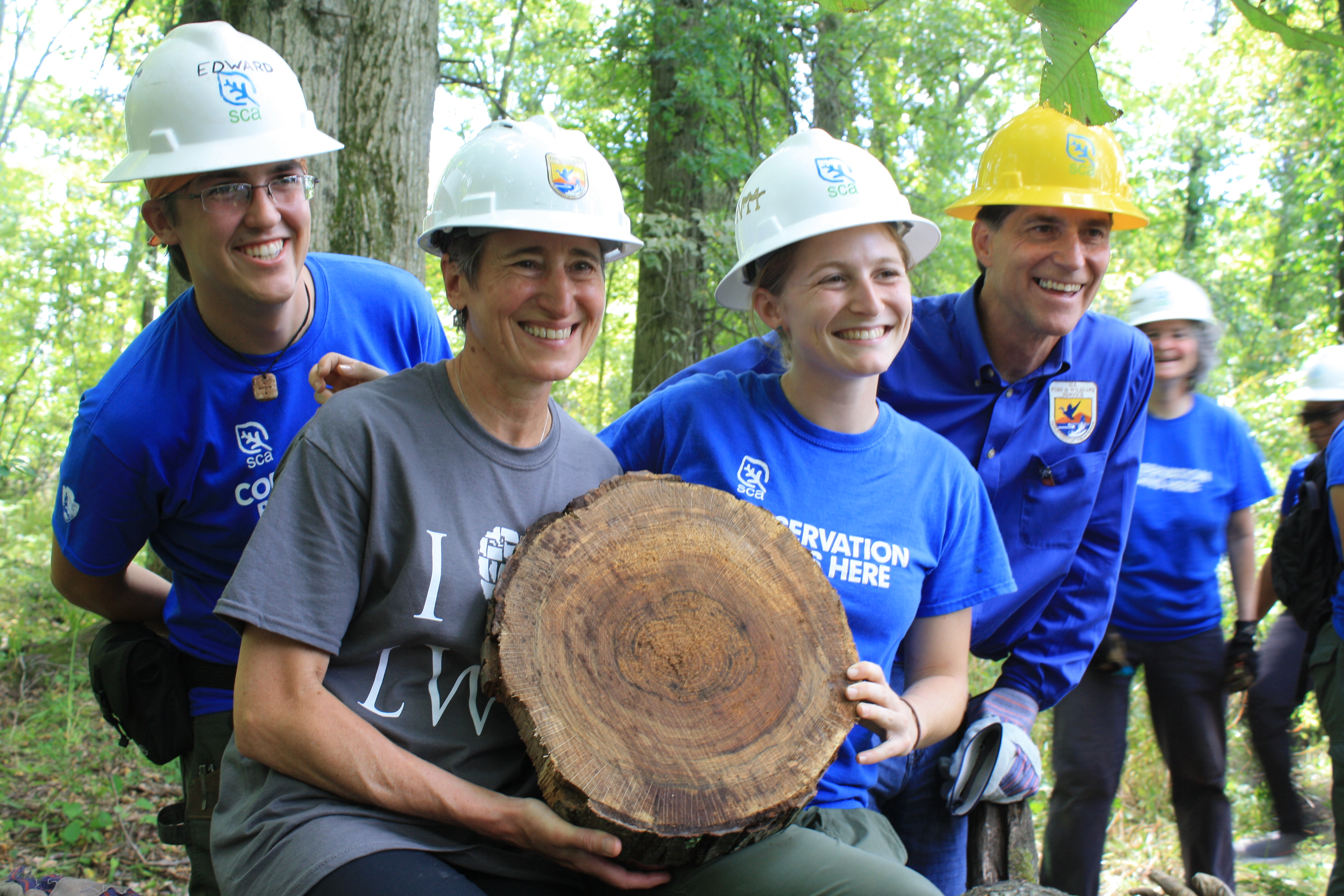

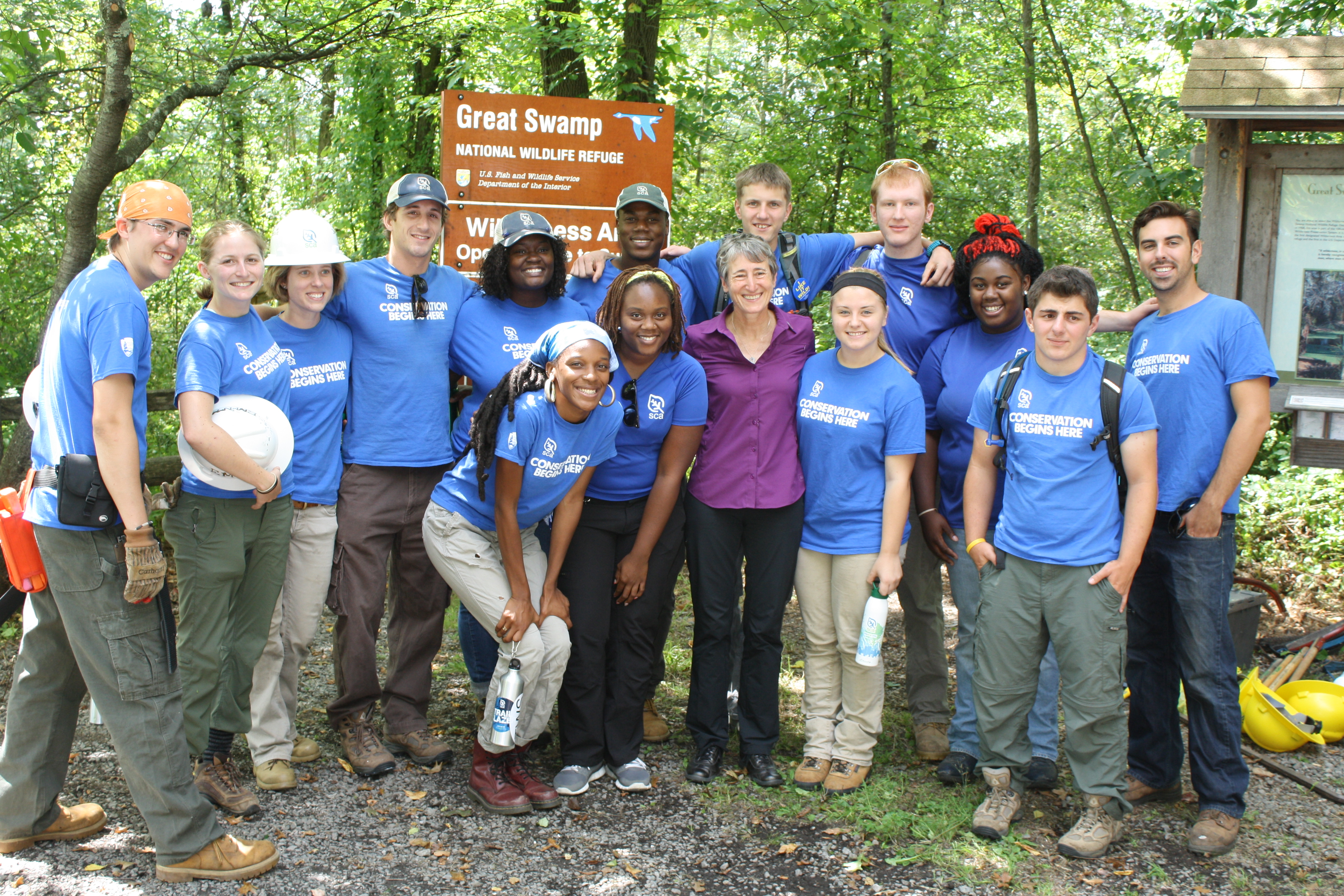

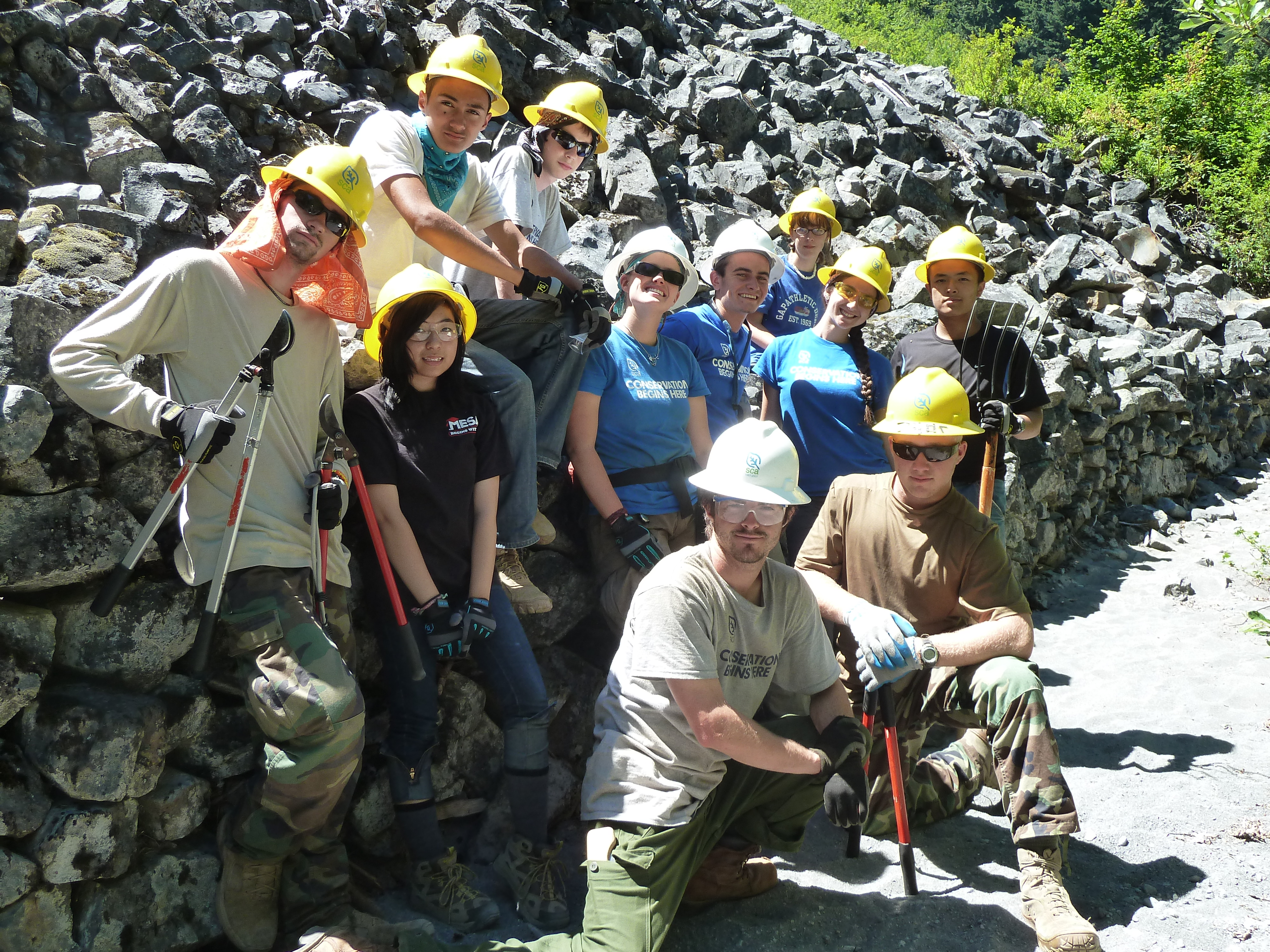

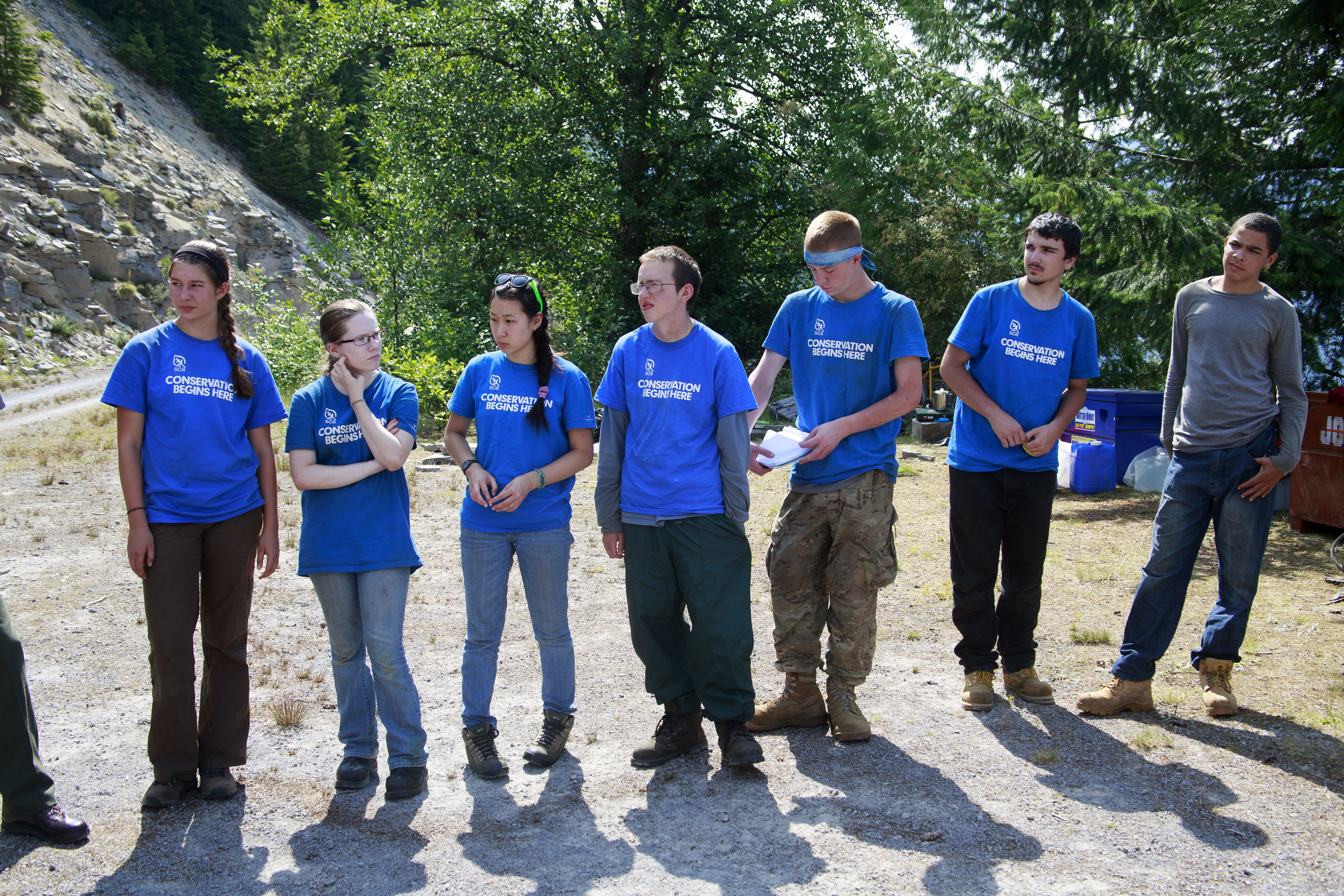

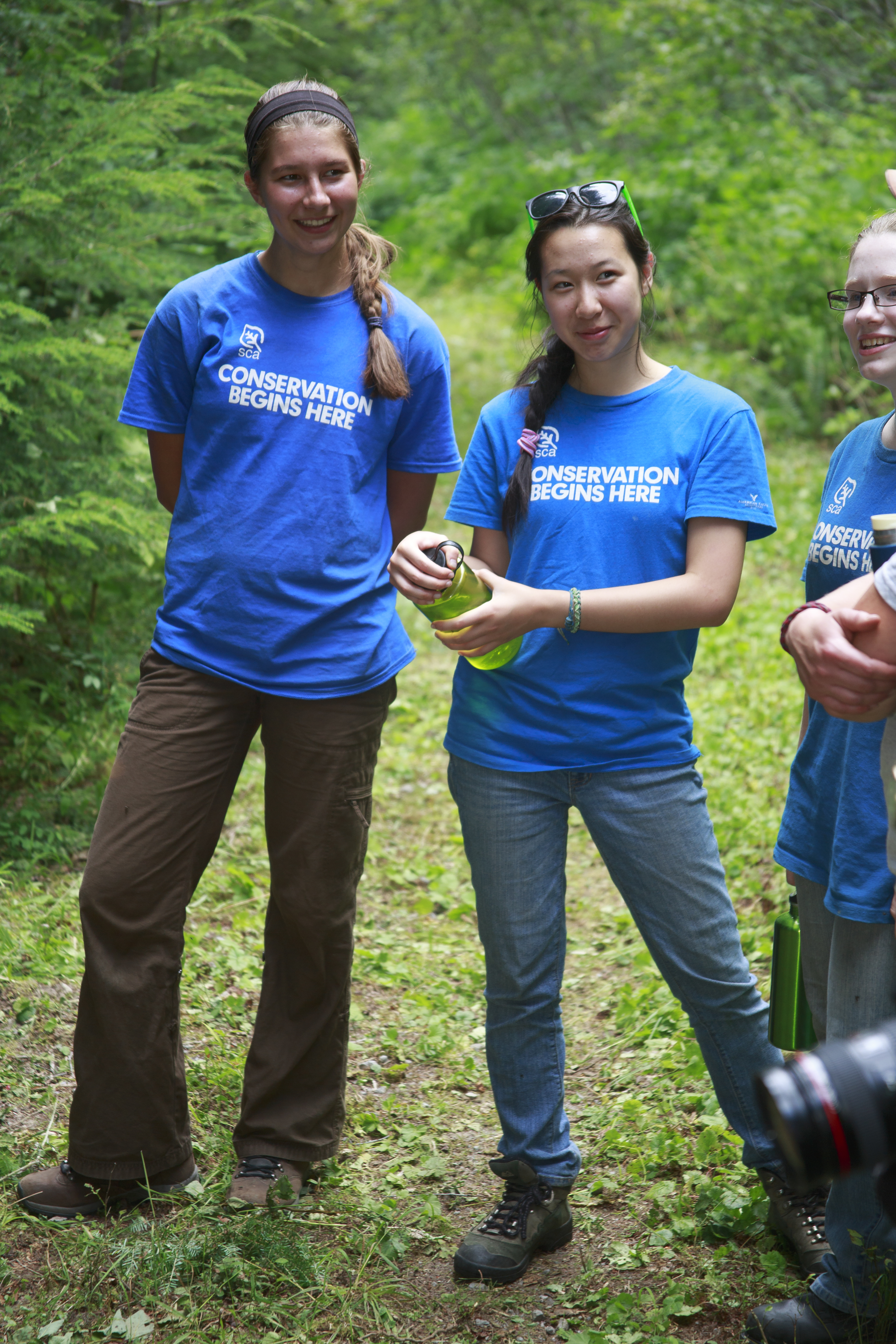

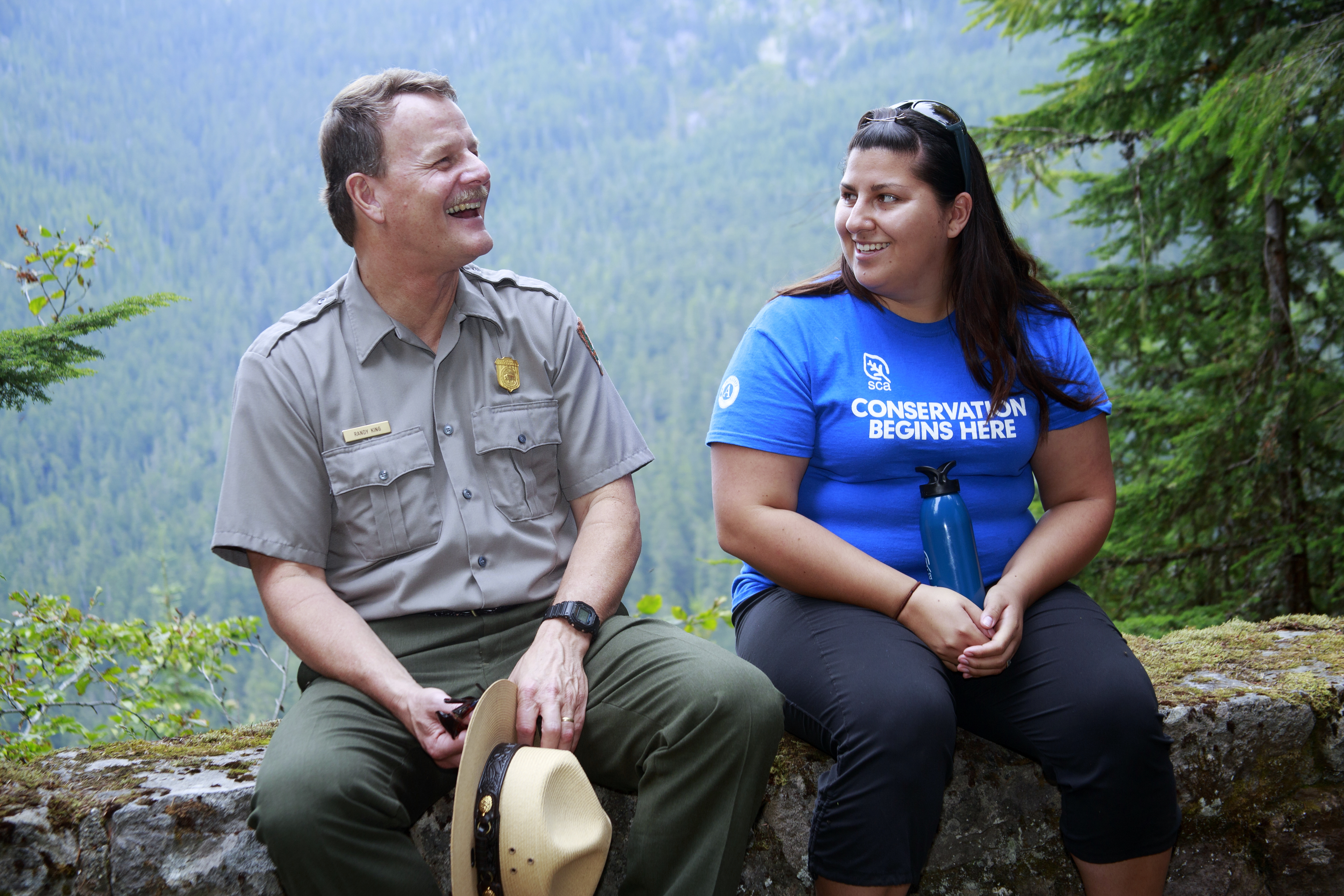

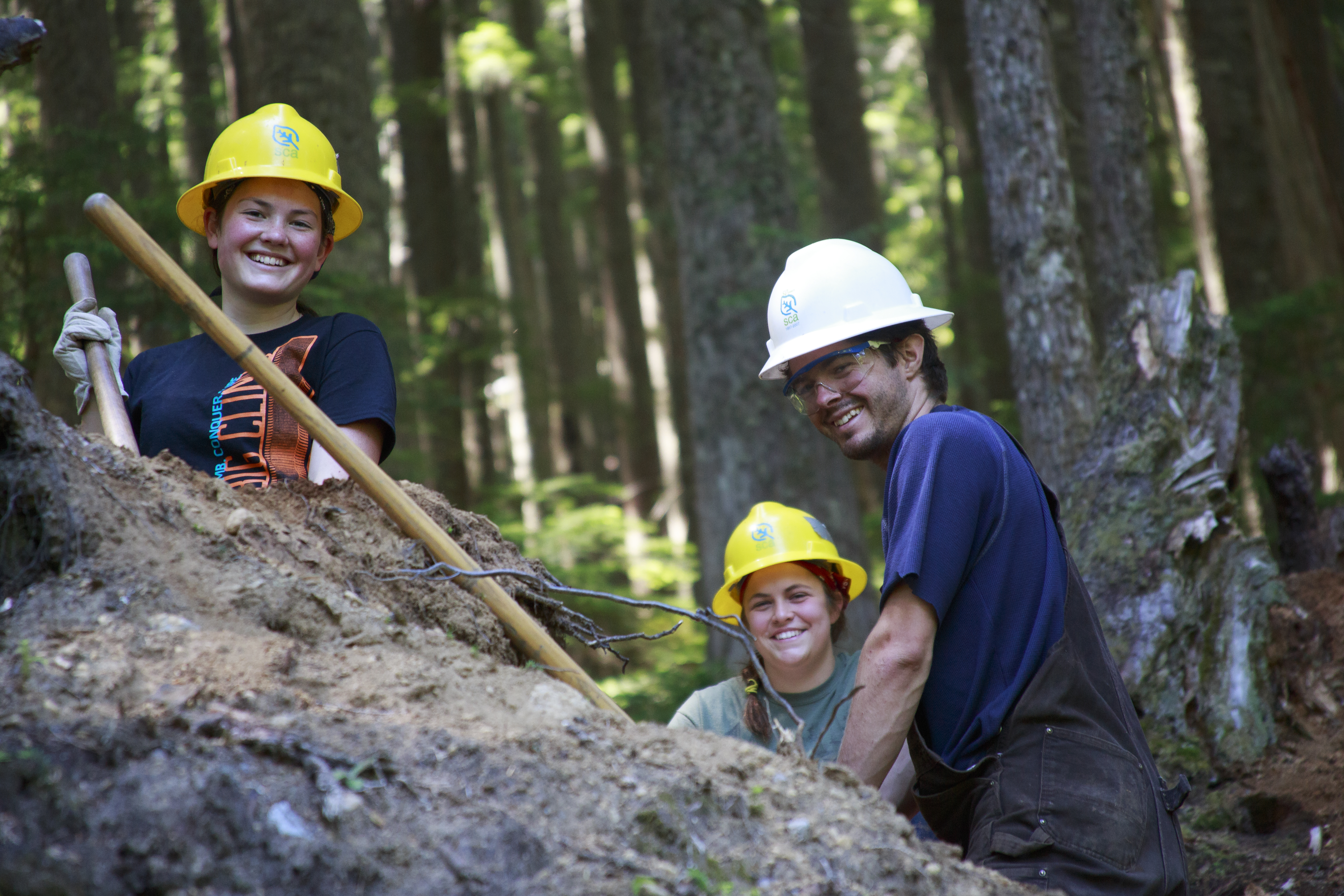

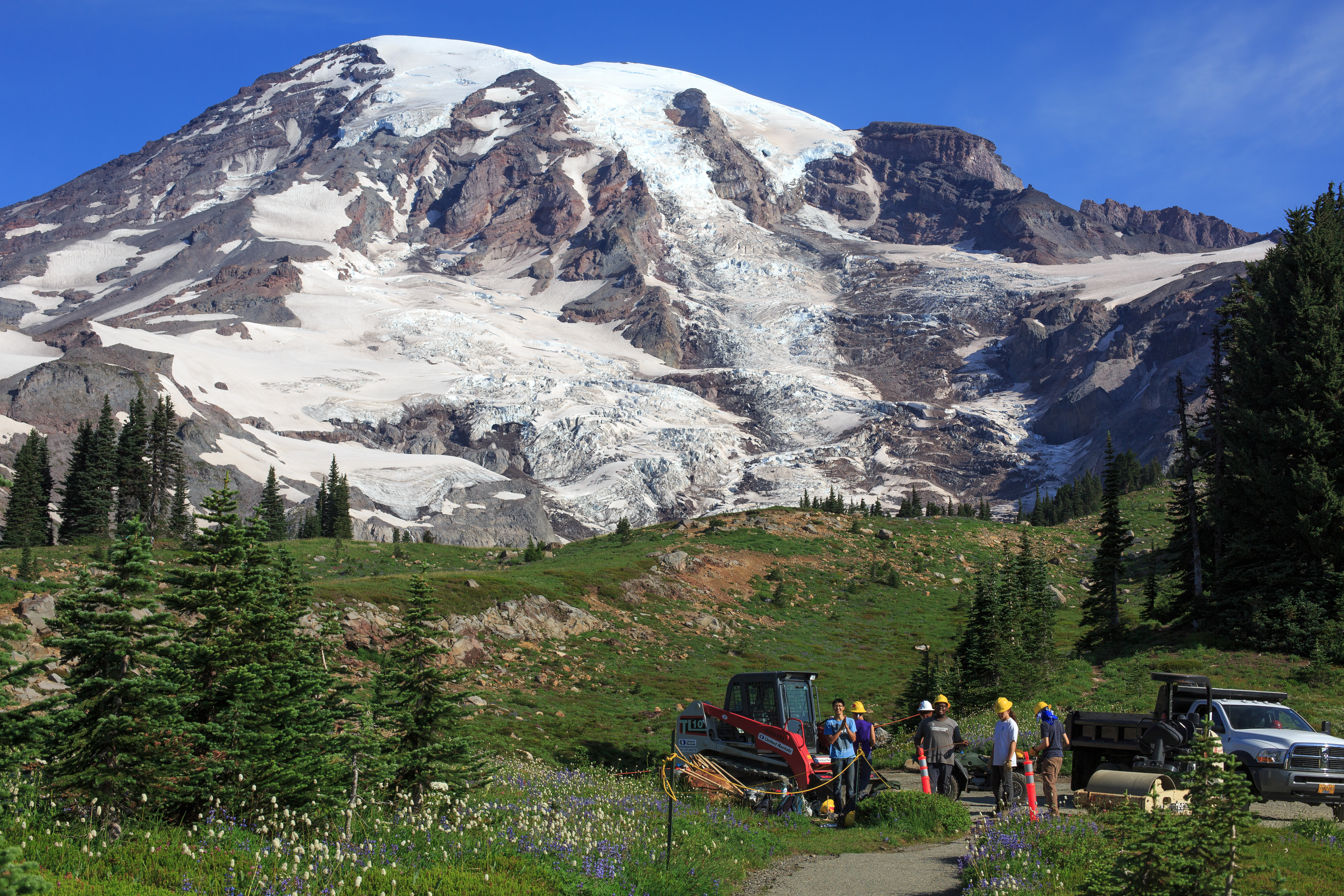

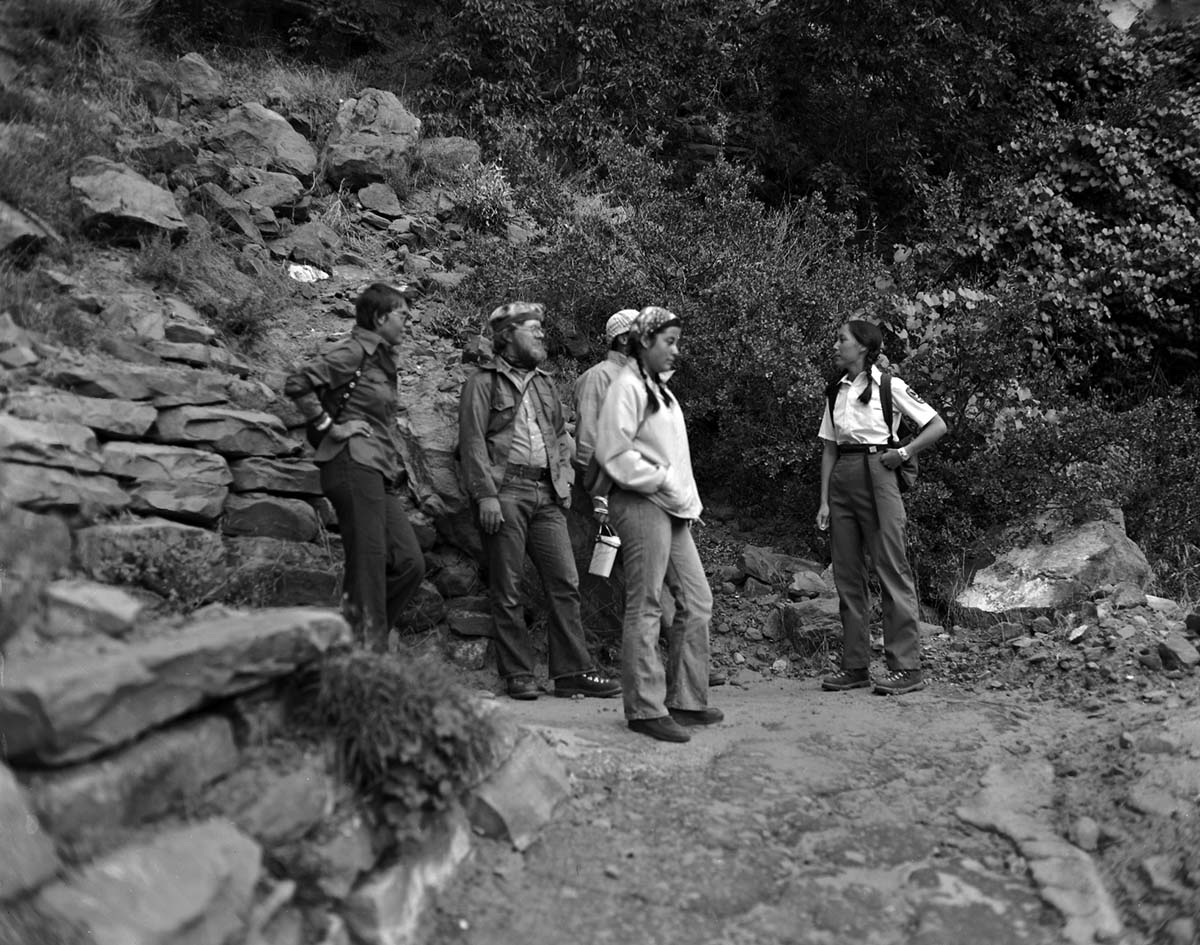

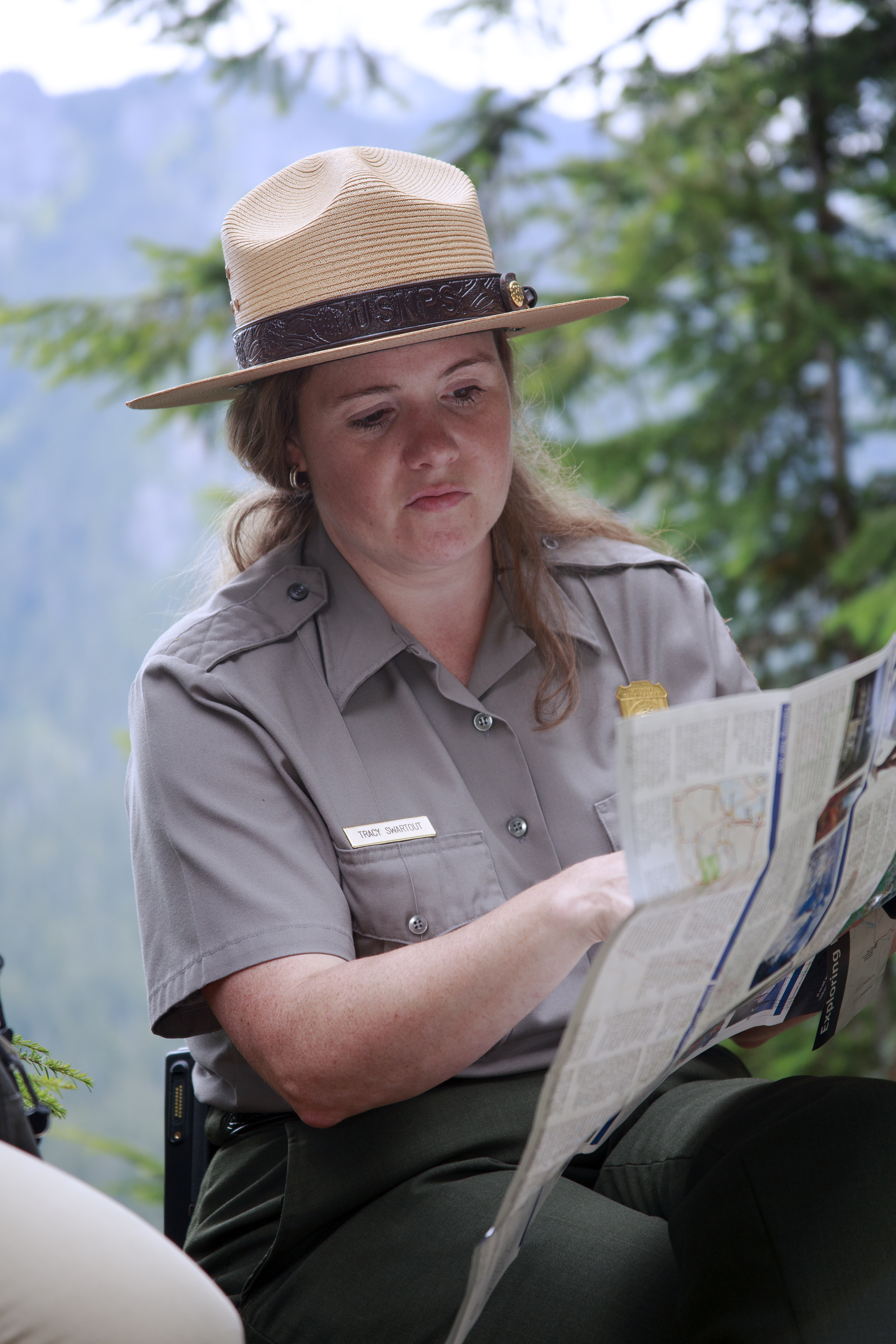
