= David Challinor =

- Born: July 11, 1920; Manhattan, NY, US
- Died: March 5, 2008 (aged 87); Washington, US
- Education: Harvard University
- Scientific career
- Fields: Biology

David Challinor (1920–2008) was an American biologist, naturalist, and Assistant Secretary for Science at the Smithsonian. His papers are archived at the Smithsonian.

He was an undergraduate at Harvard in the 1940s, and did graduate work at Yale receiving a PhD in 1966, after which he joined the Smithsonian.

== Books (author or contributor) ==
- "Trees of North America (A Golden Field Guide from St Ma…". Goodreads.
- Robinson, Michael H. (1995). Zoo animals. David Challinor, Holly Webber. New York, NY: Macmillan USA, MacMillan Publishing Company. ISBN 978-0-02-860407-7.
- Hoage, R. J. (October 17, 1989). PERCEPTIONS OF ANIMALS IN AMERN CUL (National Zoological Park Symposia for the Public). Smithsonian. ISBN 978-0-87474-493-4.
- Hoage, R.J. (December 17, 1985). ANIMAL EXTINCTIONS.
