= University of Illinois College of Law alumni =

Following is a list of notable alumni of the University of Illinois College of Law.

== Academia ==
- William Bennett Bizzell 1912 – president of the University of Oklahoma and the Agricultural and Mechanical College of Texas (now Texas A&M University)
- Ralph L. Brill – Professor of Law at Chicago-Kent College of Law and legal writing innovator
- John E. Cribbet 1947 – dean of the University of Illinois College of Law and chancellor of the University of Illinois
- Daniel Farber 1975 – Sho Sato Professor of Law at the UC Berkeley School of Law
- Nekima Levy-Pounds 2001 – activist, former president of Minneapolis NAACP and former professor at University of St. Thomas School of Law
- Philip J. McConnaughay 1978 – dean of Peking University School of Transnational Law and dean of Pennsylvania State University - Dickinson Law
- Clyde Summers 1942 – labor lawyer and law professor at the Yale Law School and University of Pennsylvania Law School, subject of In re Summers
- William D. Underwood – eighteenth president of Mercer University

== Entertainment ==
- Paul M. Lisnek 1983 – author, television and radio talk show host and interviewer
- Michael Masser – composer and producer of popular music

== Judges ==
=== Federal ===
- Wayne Andersen 1970 – United States federal judge on the United States District Court for the Northern District of Illinois
- Harold Baker 1956 – United States federal judge on the United States District Court for the Central District of Illinois
- Charles Guy Briggle 1904 – United States federal judge on the United States District Court for the Southern District of Illinois
- Colin S. Bruce 1989 – United States federal judge on the United States District Court for the Central District of Illinois
- Owen McIntosh Burns 1929 – United States federal judge on the United States District Court for the Western District of Pennsylvania
- James L. Foreman 1952 – United States federal judge on the United States District Court for the Southern District of Illinois
- James F. Holderman 1971 – United States federal judge on the United States District Court for the Northern District of Illinois
- George Evan Howell 1930 – United States federal judge on the United States Court of Claims
- William F. Jung 1983 – United States federal judge on the United States District Court for the Middle District of Florida
- Frederick J. Kapala 1976 – United States federal judge on the United States District Court for the Northern District of Illinois
- Alfred Younges Kirkland, Sr. 1943 – United States federal judge on the United States District Court for the Northern District of Illinois
- David Laro 1967 – senior judge on the United States Tax Court
- Walter C. Lindley 1910 – United States federal judge on the United States Court of Appeals for the Seventh Circuit
- George Michael Marovich 1954 – United States federal judge on the United States District Court for the Northern District of Illinois
- Prentice Henry Marshall 1967 – United States federal judge on the United States District Court for the Northern District of Illinois
- Frederick Olen Mercer 1924 – United States federal judge on the United States District Court for the Southern District of Illinois
- William A. Moorman 1970 – judge on the United States Court of Appeals for Veterans Claims
- Philip Godfrey Reinhard 1964 – United States federal judge on the United States District Court for the Northern District of Illinois
- Stanley Julian Roszkowski 1954 – United States federal judge on the United States District Court for the Northern District of Illinois
- Fred Louis Wham 1909 – United States federal judge on the United States District Court for the Eastern District of Illinois
- Harlington Wood, Jr. 1948 – United States federal judge on the United States Court of Appeals for the Seventh Circuit

=== State ===
- Thomas R. Chiola 1977 – judge of the Illinois Circuit Court of Cook County, first openly gay elected official in Illinois
- Arno H. Denecke 1939 – Chief Justice Oregon Supreme Court
- Byron O. House 1926 – Chief Justice Supreme Court of Illinois
- Lloyd A. Karmeier 1964 – Chief Justice Supreme Court of Illinois
- Ray Klingbiel 1924 – Chief Justice Supreme Court of Illinois
- Howard C. Ryan – Chief Justice Supreme Court of Illinois
- Roy Solfisburg 1940 (LL.B) – Chief Justice Supreme Court of Illinois
- Robert C. Underwood 1939 – Chief Justice Supreme Court of Illinois

=== Other ===
- Antonio Herman de Vasconcellos e Benjamin (LL.M) – judge of the Superior Court of Justice of Brazil
- R. Grant Hammond (LL.M) – judge of the New Zealand Court of Appeal

== Law ==
- Albert E. Jenner, Jr. 1930 (LL.B.) – one of the name partners at the law firm of Jenner & Block
- Jerome W. Van Gorkom 1941 – CEO of TransUnion, U.S. Under Secretary of State for Management 1982–83, best known as the named party in the landmark corporate law case of Smith v. Van Gorkom, 488 A.2d 858 (Del. 1985).

== Literature and journalism ==
- Leonard V. Finder – newspaper editor and publisher
- Michael Fumento – journalist and author

== Military ==
- Reginald C. Harmon 1927 – First United States Air Force Judge Advocate General
- Thomas R. Lamont 1972 – United States Assistant Secretary of the Army (Manpower and Reserve Affairs)

== Politics ==
- Al Salvi 1985 – Illinois House, US Senate candidate, Managing Partner of Salvi & Maher, LLP
- John Bayard Anderson 1946 – United States House of Representatives and presidential candidate
- William W. Arnold 1901 – United States House of Representatives
- Jason Barickman 2006 – Illinois State Senate
- Terry Lee Bruce 1969 –United States House of Representatives
- John Porter East 1959 – U.S. Senator
- Tom Fink 1952 – Speaker of the Alaska House of Representatives; Mayor of Anchorage
- Otis Ferguson Glenn 1910 – U.S. Senator
- William J. Graham 1893 – United States House of Representatives
- William Perry Holaday 1905 – United States House of Representatives
- George Evan Howell 1930 – United States House of Representatives
- Jesse Jackson, Jr. 1993 – United States House of Representatives
- Tim Johnson 1972 – United States House of Representatives
- Annette Lu 1971 – 8th Vice President of the Republic of China
- B. J. Pak – United States Attorney for the Northern District of Georgia; Member of the Georgia House of Representatives
- Samuel H. Shapiro 1929 – Governor of Illinois
- James C. Soper 1931 – Illinois Senate
- William L. Springer 1935 – United States House of Representatives
- Michael Strautmanis 1994 – Chief Counsel and the Director of Public Liaison and Intergovernmental Affairs on the Barack Obama presidential transition team
- Sheadrick Turner – Illinois House of Representatives
- Harold H. Velde 1937 – United States House of Representatives
- Samuel H. Young 1947 – United States House of Representatives

== Sports ==
- Josh Whitman, 2008 – Athletic director at the University of Illinois, former NFL player
