= Seiler =

Seiler (German for "roper") is a surname. Notable people with the surname include:

- Alexander Seiler I (1819–1891), Swiss Hotel Pioneer
- Alexander J. Seiler (1928–2018), Swiss documentary filmmaker
- Bernhard Seiler (1930–2025), Swiss agronomist and politician
- Cole Seiler (born 1994), American former soccer player
- Eugen Seiler (born 1984), German politician
- Franz Seiler (1897–1966), Swiss lawyer and hotelier
- Hanspeter Seiler (born 1933), Swiss former politician
- Hermann Seiler (1876–1961), Swiss Hotel Pioneer & Politician
- Jack Seiler (born 1963), American politician and Mayor of Fort Lauderdale, Florida
- Jacques Seiler (1928–2004), French actor
- Jordan Seiler, American public space artist
- Kerim Seiler (born 1974), Swiss artist and architect
- Les Seiler (born 1941), American politician from Nebraska
- Lewis Seiler (1890–1964), American film director
- Lutz Seiler (born 1963), German poet and novelist
- Michael J. Seiler, American behavioral real estate scholar
- Michael T. Seiler (born 1967), former Texas state court judge
- Midori Seiler (born 1969), German-Japanese violinist
- Natalie Seiler (born 1968), Swiss gymnast
- Nathaniel Seiler (born 1996), Filipino-German racewalker
- Paul Seiler (1945–2001), American football player
- Randy Seiler (1946–2023), American attorney
- Reinhard Seiler (1909–1989), German Luftwaffe pilot
- Robert Eldridge Seiler (1912–1998), American judge on the Missouri Supreme Court
- Sara Seiler (born 1983), German ice hockey player
- Sebastian Seiler (1810–1890), German journalist
- Sonny Seiler (1933–2023), American attorney and bulldog owner
- Stephan Seiler (born 2000), Swiss footballer of Brazilian descent
- Theo Seiler (born 1949), German ophthalmologist and physicist
- Walter Seiler (born 1954), Swiss footballer
- Wolfgang Seiler (born 1940), German biogeochemist and climatologist

== See also ==
- Henry Seiler Wise (1909–1982), United States district judge
- Sailer (disambiguation)
- Sayler
- Seyler
- Seiler Instrument & Mfg. Co.
- Seiler Pianofortefabrik GmbH
