= Michael Seiler =

Michael Seiler may refer to:

- Michael T. Seiler, district judge in Texas
- Michael J. Seiler, American behavioral real estate scholar
