= Nicole Baukus =

American criminal

- Born: April 2, 1989 (age 37); Houston, Texas, US
- Status: Inmate at Mountain View Unit in Gatesville, Texas
- Convictions: Intoxication manslaughter (2 counts); Intoxication assault
- Penalty: 38 years imprisonment

Nicole Nadra Baukus (born April 2, 1989) is an American woman convicted of two counts of vehicular manslaughter stemming from a fatal car collision on June 29, 2012, in which she was driving intoxicated. Baukus pleaded guilty to the charges and was sentenced to 38 years in prison with the possibility of parole. Highway surveillance cameras showed Baukus' vehicle traveling on the wrong side of Interstate 45 after she had consumed alcohol at a nearby bar. A later request for a new trial was denied. Baukus attended and graduated from Oak Ridge High School in Conroe, Texas.

== Trial ==
Baukus was charged with two counts of second-degree felony intoxication manslaughter and one count of third-degree felony intoxication assault. After initially pleading not guilty to the charges against her, she pleaded guilty to two counts of vehicular manslaughter on August 1, 2013. Baukus was sentenced to a maximum of 15 years in prison on each count. She is currently eligible for parole in 2021. The judge in her trial, Michael Seiler, resigned from the bench to avoid prosecution from matters unrelated to this case.

== Appeal ==
Baukus filed an appeal of her conviction, which was denied with a dissenting opinion in the Texas 9th District Court of Appeals. She filed a petition for discretionary review with the Texas Court of Criminal Appeals, which was refused. On September 11, 2017, Baukus filed a writ of habeas corpus in the 435th District Court of Montgomery County, Texas with allegations of police misconduct, planting of evidence, prosecutorial misconduct, and ineffective assistance of her trial lawyer. The case is now pending before the Texas Court of Criminal Appeals.
