= Judge Ackerman =

Judge Ackerman may refer to:

- Harold A. Ackerman (1928–2009), judge of the United States District Court for the District of New Jersey
- J. Waldo Ackerman (1926–1984), judge of the United States District Courts for the Southern and Central Districts of Illinois
