= Robert B. Chiperfield =

American politician (1899–1971)

Robert Bruce Chiperfield
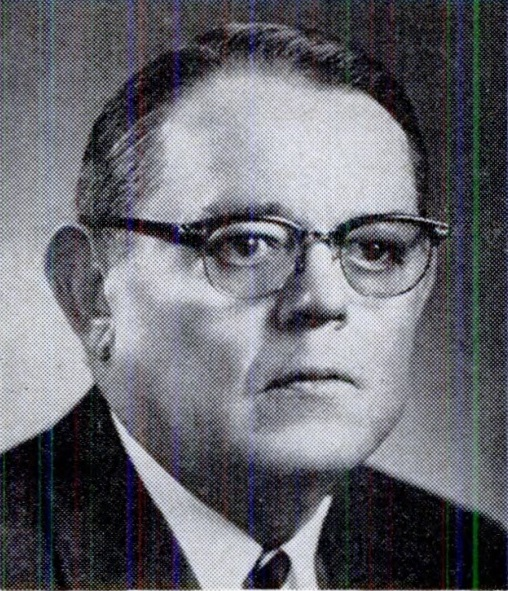
- From 1959's Pocket Congressional Directory of the Eighty-sixth Congress

Member of the U.S. House of Representatives from Illinois
- In office January 3, 1939 – January 3, 1963
- Preceded by: Lewis L. Boyer
- Succeeded by: Robert T. McLoskey
- Constituency: 15th district (1939-1949); 19th district (1949-1963)

Personal details
- Born: November 20, 1899 Canton, Illinois, US
- Died: April 9, 1971 (aged 71) Canton, Illinois, US
- Resting place: Greenwood Cemetery, Canton
- Party: Republican
- Spouse(s): Katherine "Kitty" Newbern; Eunice K. Anderson
- Children: 2
- Education: Harvard College; Boston University
- Occupation: Lawyer

Military service
- Rank: Private
- Battles/wars: World War I

Robert Bruce Chiperfield (November 20, 1899 - April 9, 1971), son of United States Congressman Burnett Mitchell Chiperfield, was an Illinois lawyer and 12-term U.S. Representative from Illinois. He served as chairman of the House Committee on Foreign Affairs during the early years of the Eisenhower administration.

== Early life and education ==
Born on November 20, 1899, in Canton, Illinois, Robert B. Chiperfield was the second of three children and the older of the two sons of Burnett M. Chiperfield and Clara Louise Ross. Robert Chiperfield's father served as a Republican member of the U.S. House of Representatives, representing Illinois' at-large congressional district from 1915 to 1917 and Illinois's 15th congressional district from 1930 to 1933. Robert's mother was a granddaughter of Ossian M. Ross, who was a prominent Illinois pioneer and the founder of Lewistown, Illinois. Robert's younger brother, Claude Burnett Chiperfield, served as a U.S. consul in Athens, Greece in 1938.

Robert Chiperfield received his early education in the public schools of Canton, Illinois, and also in Washington, D.C., during the years that his father served in Congress. Robert attended Phillips Exeter Academy in Exeter, New Hampshire from 1916 to 1918. He served as a private in the U.S. Army during World War I. Chiperfield attended Knox College in Galesburg, Illinois for one year, before transferring to Harvard College in Cambridge, Massachusetts, where he received a Bachelor's degree in 1922. He attended Harvard Law School for two years, and then received his law degree from Boston University in 1925. In the fall of 1941, Chiperfield returned briefly to the classroom, enrolling in a freshman-level public speaking course at George Washington University.

== Marriage and children ==
On July 1, 1930, Robert Chiperfield married Katherine "Kitty" Alice Newbern, age 25. The couple had two children: Robert Newbern Chiperfield (1934 – 2015) and Virginia Chiperfield (1942 – 2016). Kitty Chiperfield died of cancer on April 22, 1955, at a treatment center in Berkeley, California.

Chiperfield married his second wife, Eunice Kathryn Anderson, age 54, an employee of the U.S. Department of Agriculture, on March 21, 1963, in Chevy Chase, Maryland.

== Professional life ==
Chiperfield was admitted to the bar of Illinois in 1925. He commenced the practice of law in Canton, Illinois, joining the law firm of Chiperfield and Chiperfield, which was founded by his father and his uncle, Judge Claude E. Chiperfield. Clients included the Chicago, Quincy & Burlington Railroad and the International Harvester Company.

Chiperfield also served as the city attorney of Canton in 1926. He was a member of the American Legion, Forty and Eight, Phi Delta Theta and Phi Delta Phi fraternities, Freemasons, Benevolent and Protective Order of Elks, Fraternal Order of Eagles, and Loyal Order of Moose.

== Political service ==
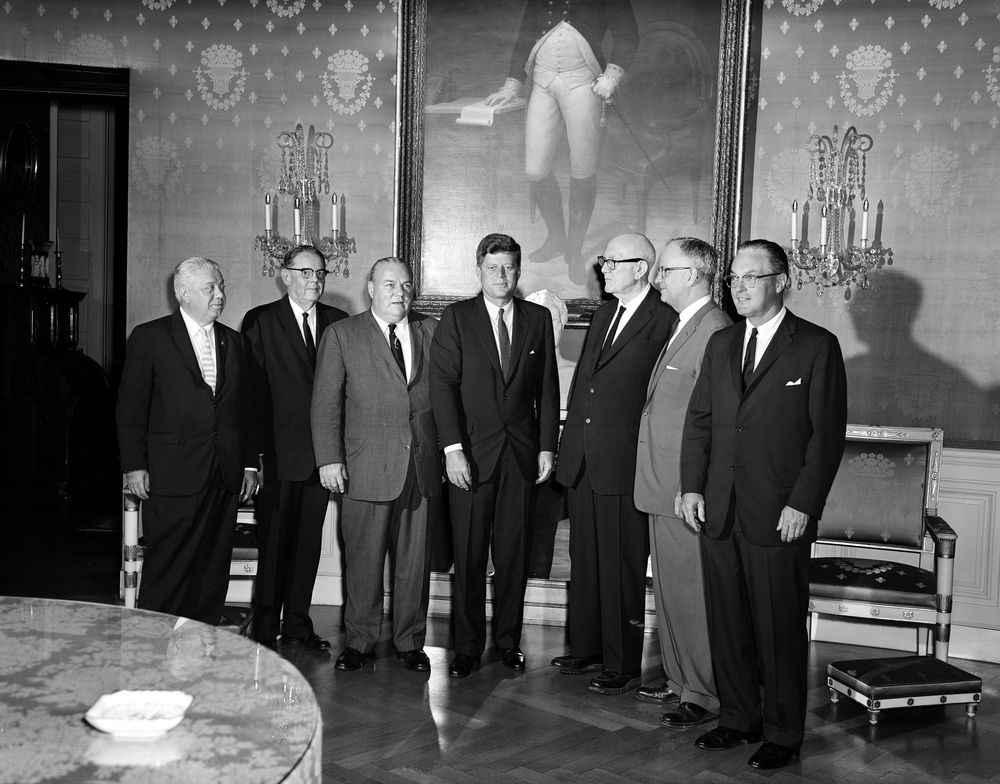
Hon. Robert B. Chiperfield (2nd from left) at a congressional coffee hour with President John F. Kennedy (center) and other congressmen on 14 September 1961 (White House Photographs, John F. Kennedy Presidential Library and Museum).

In 1938, Robert Chiperfield was elected as a Republican to the Seventy-sixth Congress, representing Illinois' 15th congressional district, a seat that his father had held previously. Robert Chiperfield was then reelected to the eleven succeeding Congresses, serving continuously from January 3, 1939, to January 3, 1963. In 1949, the congressional districts of Illinois were reorganized, and Chiperfield represented the 19th district after that date. In 1962, he decided not to run for reelection, stating that he wanted to "get rid of the heavy responsibilities of Congress" and "lead a normal happy life."

Chiperfield was appointed to the House Committee on Foreign Affairs in 1939. He served as committee chairman from 1953 to 1955 (Eighty-third Congress), having won the chairmanship position in a coin toss between himself and another Republican who had entered Congress at the same time, Representative John M. Vorys of Ohio. Chiperfield lost the chairmanship when the Democrats organized the Eighty-fourth Congress in 1955. Chiperfield voted in favor of the Civil Rights Act of 1957 and the 24th Amendment to the U.S. Constitution, but did not vote on the Civil Rights Act of 1960. However, he remained the ranking Republican member of the House Foreign Affairs Committee until his retirement from Congress.

During the Kennedy administration, Chiperfield remained active in foreign affairs. Several photographs of Congressman Robert Chiperfield attending official events during the presidency of John F. Kennedy are contained in the digital archives of the John F. Kennedy Presidential Library and Museum. These events include a dinner in honor of the president of Pakistan in 1961; congressional coffee hours with President Kennedy in 1961; a visit with Vice President Lyndon B. Johnson following Johnson's return from Southeast Asia in 1962; and signings of the Foreign Assistance Act and the Philippines War Damage Bill by President Kennedy in 1962. On September 4, 1962, Chiperfield was one of seven congressmen who attended a meeting with congressional leadership on Cuba, in which President Kennedy and other government officials discussed strategies to deal with the deployment of Soviet missiles in Cuba prior to the Cuban Missile Crisis.

== Political views ==
Chiperfield generally opposed foreign involvement by the U.S. and favored limited spending for U.S. military defense. He voted against the Lend-lease bill of 1941 and was critical of President Truman's foreign policy and foreign spending. He was against the establishment of a naval base at Guam (February 1939), voted against the Greek-Turkish aid bill (1947) opposed the granting of economic aid to Korea (February 1950), and was against universal military training and extension of the draft (April 1951). A confidential analysis of the House Foreign Affairs Committee prepared for the British Foreign Office in 1943 described Robert Chiperfield as:

An out-and-out pre-Pearl Harbour Isolationist. One of the four Republican members who constitute the real Opposition in the committee. Suspicious of the President and of the executive's alleged attempts to bypass and undermine Congressional authority. A sour and intransigent figure. In close relations with the Chicago Tribune. A Congregationalist; age 44. Nationalist.

— Isaiah Berlin, Dispatch No. 292, British Embassy, Washington, D.C. to the London Foreign Office, April 19, 1943.

In an article published in The Reader's Digest in 1951, Chiperfield presented evidence for his belief that the U.S. had been "the principal source of supply for Iron Curtain armament," through the Lend-lease program and the United Nations Relief and Rehabilitation Administration, and indirectly through funds allocated to Europe under the Marshall Plan. He contended that public opinion was "aroused and indignant" at this state of affairs, and that Congress should effectively declare: "Not one dollar for any country which supplies, directly or indirectly, an iota of military potential to the Kremlin's arsenal of aggression."

In 1953, Chiperfield published his perspective as committee chairman on the history, composition, and role of the House Committee on Foreign Affairs. In this article, he emphasized the increasing role of Congress in foreign relations during the period following World War II, which he pointed out was inevitable given Congress' "constitutional power over 'the purse.'" He also stressed the "need for closer Executive-Congressional collaboration and participation in basic decisions affecting foreign policy."

== Later life and death ==
Following his years of service as a U.S. congressman, Robert Chiperfield returned to Canton, Illinois, where he resided with his second wife until his death from a heart attack on April 9, 1971. He was interred in the Chiperfield plot in Greenwood Cemetery in Canton. His memorial reads in part: "Lawyer-Statesman-U.S. Congress 1938-1962."

U.S. House of Representatives
Preceded by Lewis L. Boyer	Member of the U.S. House of Representatives from Illinois's 15th congressional district 1939-1949	Succeeded by Noah M. Mason
Preceded by Rolla C. McMillen	Member of the U.S. House of Representatives from Illinois's 19th congressional district 1949-1963	Succeeded by Robert T. McLoskey
