= Burnett M. Chiperfield =

American politician

Burnett Mitchell Chiperfield
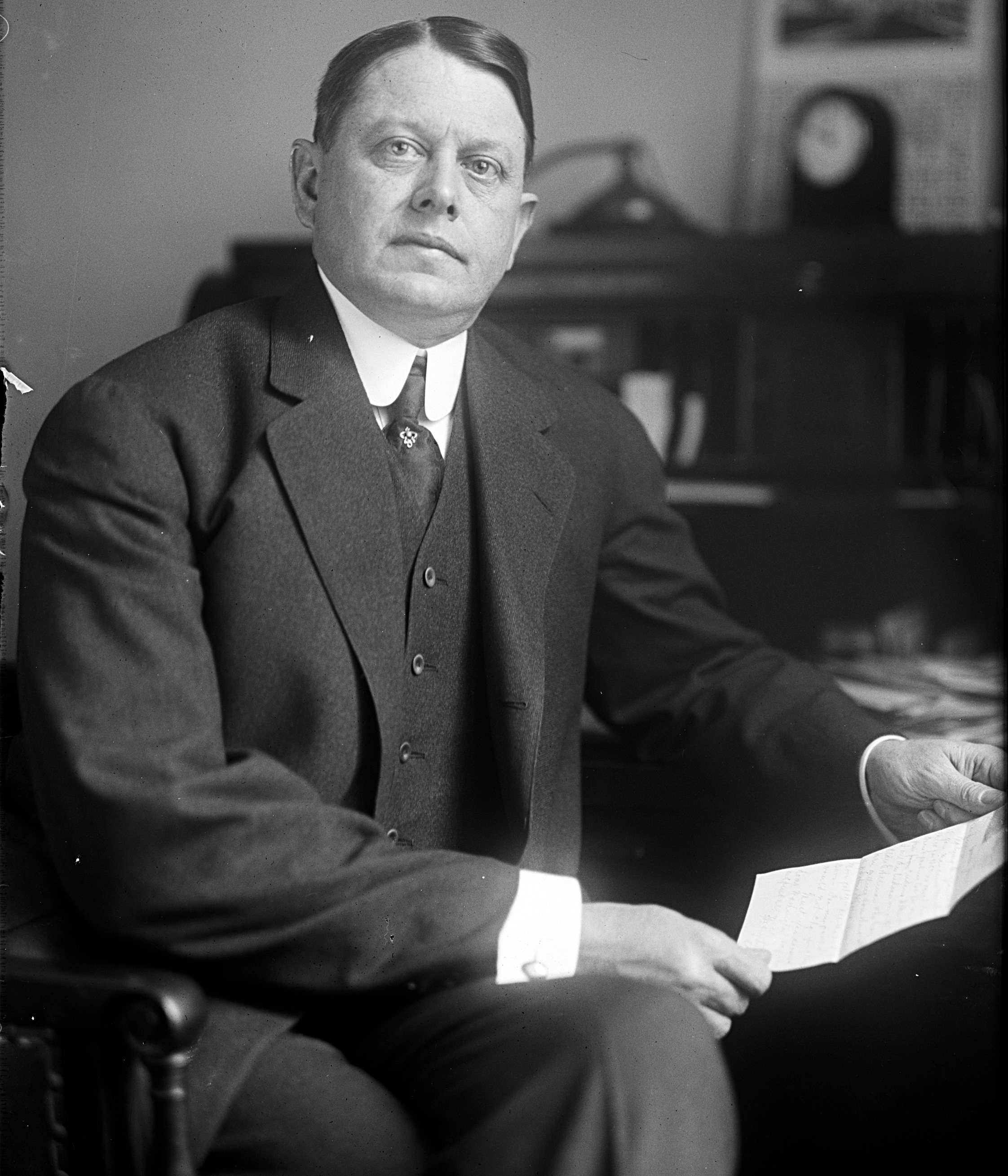

Member of the U.S. House of Representatives from Illinois's at-large district
- In office March 4, 1915 – March 3, 1917
- Preceded by: Lawrence B. Stringer
- Succeeded by: Joseph M. McCormick

Member of the U.S. House of Representatives from Illinois's 15th district
- In office November 4, 1930 – March 3, 1933
- Preceded by: Edward J. King
- Succeeded by: J. Leroy Adair

Member of the Illinois House of Representatives
- In office 1903-1913

Personal details
- Born: June 14, 1870 Dover, Illinois, U.S.
- Died: June 24, 1940 (aged 70) Canton, Illinois, U.S.
- Resting place: Greenwood Cemetery
- Party: Republican

Burnett Mitchell Chiperfield (June 14, 1870 – June 24, 1940) was a U.S. representative from Illinois, father of Robert Bruce Chiperfield.

== Early life and military service ==
Born in Dover, Illinois, Chiperfield attended the public schools of Illinois and Hamline University, St. Paul, Minnesota, and later studied law. He was admitted to the bar in 1891 and was a lawyer in private practice and prosecuting attorney for Fulton County, Illinois, from 1896 to 1900. He served as a member of the Illinois House of Representatives from 1903 to 1913. He was secretary and trustee of the Western Illinois State Normal School (now Western Illinois University), Macomb, Illinois, from 1904 to 1909.

He served as an officer in the Illinois National Guard for twenty years. He served in the Spanish–American War, and was later in the United States Army Judge Advocate General's Corps from 1917 to 1919 and 1921 to 1934 and rose to the rank of lieutenant colonel. In this capacity, he investigated claims of subversion in the Army and he also oversaw dozens of courts-martial. He also served in France during World War I, and was in civil affairs with the Army of Occupation in Koblenz after the war.

He was also a banker.

== Congressional career ==
Chiperfield was an unsuccessful candidate for election to the Sixty-third Congress in 1912. He was elected as a Republican to the Sixty-fourth Congress (March 4, 1915 – March 3, 1917). He did not seek renomination, but was an unsuccessful candidate for the United States Senate. He served as delegate to the Republican National Conventions in 1920 and 1936.

Chiperfield was elected simultaneously as a Republican to the Seventy-first and Seventy-second Congresses to fill the vacancy caused by the death of United States Representative-elect Edward J. King (November 4, 1930 – March 3, 1933).

He was an unsuccessful candidate for reelection to the Seventy-third Congress in 1932 and for election to the Seventy-fourth Congress in 1934.

He died on June 24, 1940, in Canton, Illinois, and was interred in Greenwood Cemetery.

U.S. House of Representatives
Preceded by Lawrence B. Stringer	Member of the U.S. House of Representatives from Illinois's at-large congressional district March 4, 1915 – March 3, 1917	Succeeded by Joseph M. McCormick
Preceded by Edward J. King	Member of the U.S. House of Representatives from Illinois's 15th congressional district November 4, 1930 – March 3, 1933	Succeeded by J. Leroy Adair
