= Swiss School of Tourism and Hospitality =

Coordinates: 46.8302°N 9.5475°E

EHL Hotel School Passugg
- EHL Hotelfachschule Passugg
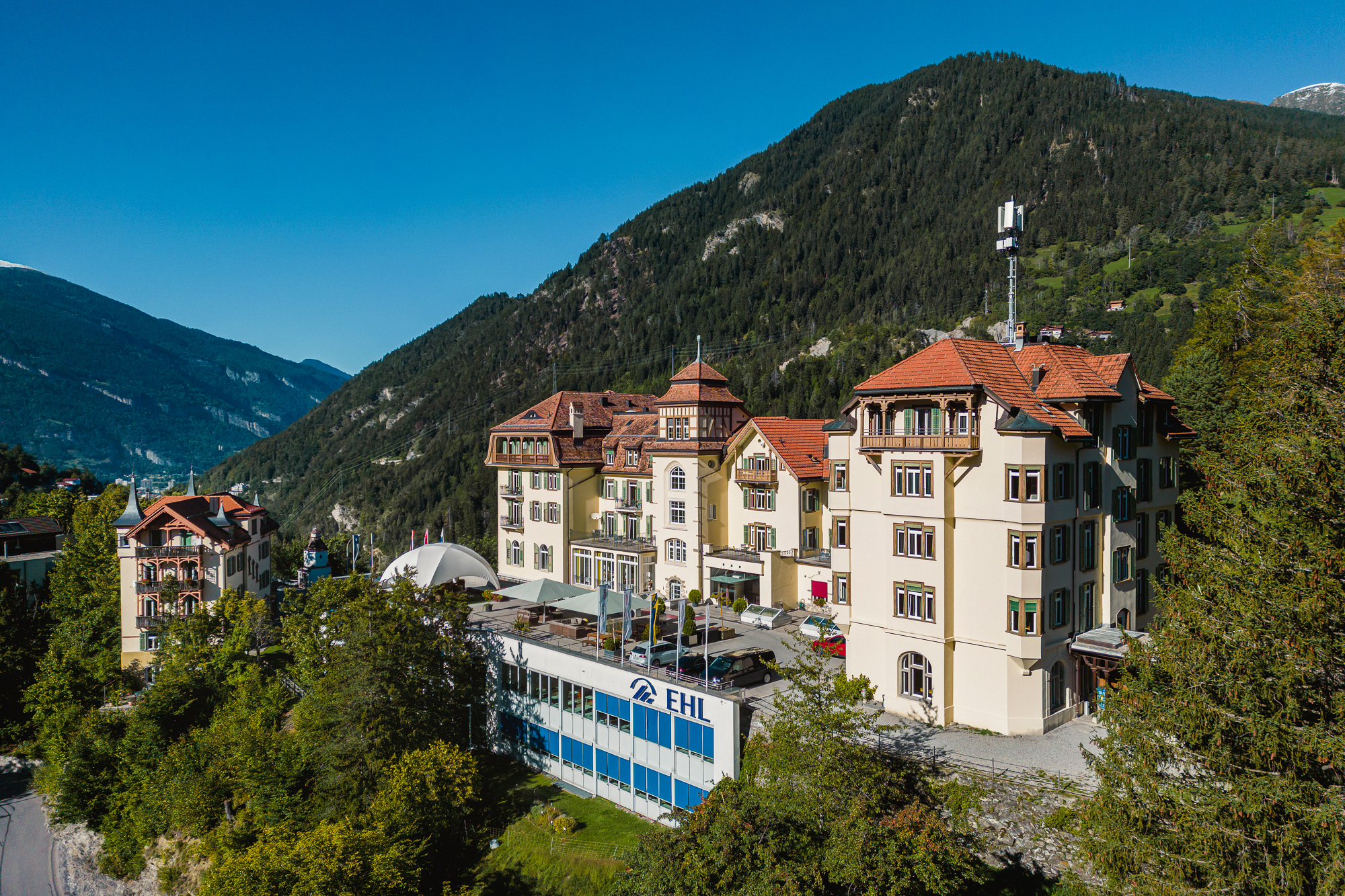
- Type: vocational education tertiary education
- Established: 1966
- Affiliations: Hotelleriesuisse Ecole hôtelière de Lausanne
- Director: Ulrike Kuhnhenn
- Faculty: 60
- Students: 400
- Location: https://de.wikipedia.org/wiki/Passugg, Graubünden, Switzerland
- Campus: EHL Campus Passugg
- Website: passugg.ehl.edu

The EHL Hotel School Passugg / EHL Hotelfachschule Passugg (former EHL Swiss School of Tourism and Hospitality / EHL SSTH) is a Swiss hotel management school located in Passugg, a village outside of Chur, Switzerland. The school was founded in 1966, and joined the EHL group in 2013. An average of 400 students from 40 different countries are educated each semester. The hotel management school offers federally recognized qualifications, ranging from basic vocational training and higher education to Bachelor of Science degrees. The EHL Campus Passugg is built around a 19th-century spa hotel and includes several buildings, offering accommodations and five in-house restaurants.

== History ==
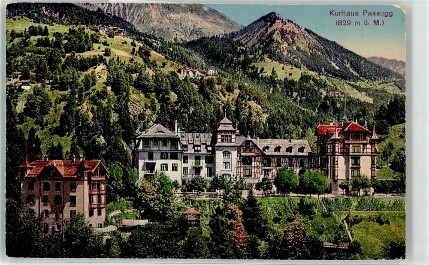
Old picture from EHL Campus Passugg

In 1966, Markus Christoffel founded the hotel division of the Hotelsekretariatsschule in Chur to educate skilled professionals and future leaders for the hospitality and gastronomy industries. In the years that followed, the business school continuously expanded its program offerings.

In 1972, the first Special Course taught in English was launched. Thanks to the strong international reputation of the Swiss education system, the program attracted students particularly from the Far East.

Step by step, the school evolved into a higher education institution offering multi-level academic programs in both German and English. Since 1991, EHL Hotelfachschule Passugg has been located in the historic Kurhotel Passugg. The former spa hotel now serves as the heart of the EHL Campus Passugg.

== Member of the EHL Group ==
EHL Hotel School Passugg has been part of the EHL Group since 2013. The EHL Group is the owner of EHL Hospitality Business School (formerly École hôtelière de Lausanne).

EHL Hospitality Business School and EHL Hotelfachschule Passugg work closely together.

== Programs ==
All programs (initial vocational education and training, the Advanced Federal Diploma in Hotel Management, and the Bachelor's degree in International Hospitality Management) are federally recognized in Switzerland.

The following qualifications can be earned on EHL Campus Passugg:

- Hotel Communication Specialist (EFZ)
- Swiss Professional Degree in Hospitality Management (officially called: Advanced Federal Diploma of Higher Education in Hospitality Management, formerly Advanced Federal Diploma as Hôtelière-Restauratrice / Hôtelier-Restaurateur)
- Bachelor of Science in International Hospitality Management

== Campus ==
More than 200 apprentices and students from 40 nationalities live on the EHL Campus Passugg. They are housed in three buildings: the School Hotel, Fontana, and the Bachelor Village.

== Restaurants ==
Five training restaurants are located under one roof at the EHL Campus Passugg. The restaurants are operated by apprentices and students under the guidance of industry professionals.

- At Umami, guests enjoy Asian cuisine, including dishes such as sushi, poké bowls, and noodle soups.
- Da Fortunat is dedicated to Swiss cuisine, with a strong focus on regional and organic products. It is also awarded with two Bio Cuisine stars from Bio Suisse. Local specialties from the canton of Graubünden, such as Maluns and Capuns, are featured on the menu.
- The bistro and bar, Campigiana, serves burgers, club sandwiches, and salads at lunchtime in a relaxed setting.
- At The Essence, students focus on the core elements of classical culinary and service training. In the kitchen, they learn to prepare large pièces and present them on platters. In service, they are trained in two styles: guéridon service - where dishes are finished, plated, and carved in front of the guest - and banquet service. Guests enjoy a freshly prepared, classic three-course menu, including wine service.
- The Market is the campus dining hall and operates as a self-service restaurant. It offers a salad bar, a vegetarian main course, a meat-based main course, and dessert. Some dishes are prepared live in front of guests following the marché concept.

== Partnerships and Collaborations ==
EHL Hotel School Passugg maintains particularly close partnerships with Campus Tourismus Graubünden and HotellerieSuisse.

Through its collaboration with Campus Tourismus Graubünden, the school actively supports the educational mission within the region. HotellerieSuisse appoints a representative to the Board of Directors of EHL Hotel School Passugg.

In addition, EHL Hotel School Passugg is a C2Q-accredited member of THE-ICE (International Centre of Excellence in Tourism and Hospitality), a recognized quality label for tourism and hospitality education.

== See also ==
- List of Hospitality Management Schools in Switzerland
