= Robert Dale Morgan =

American judge

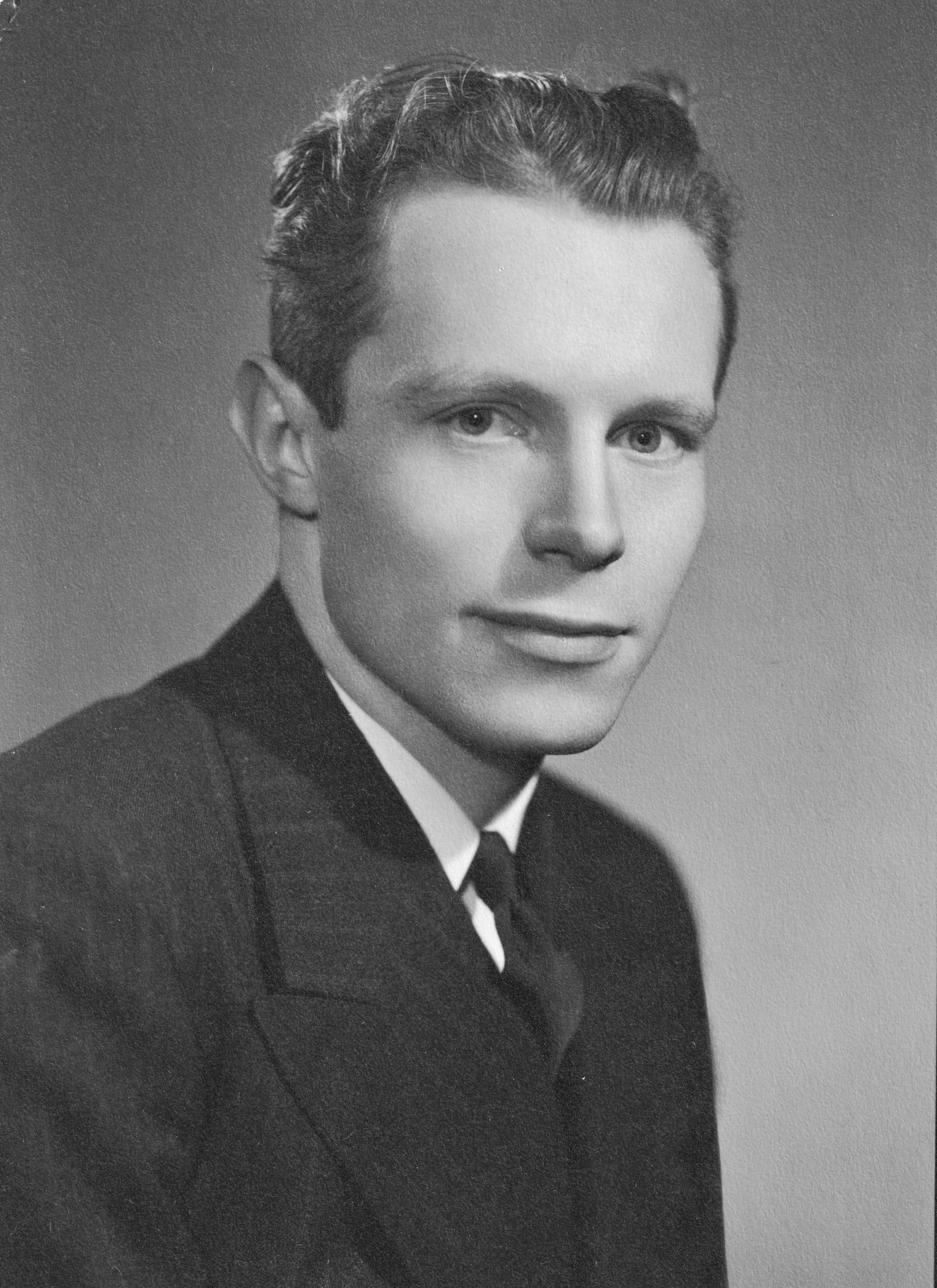
- Judge Robert Dale Morgan, c. 1968

Senior Judge of the United States District Court for the Central District of Illinois
- In office May 28, 1982 – May 29, 2002

Chief Judge of the United States District Court for the Central District of Illinois
- In office 1979–1982
- Preceded by: Office established
- Succeeded by: J. Waldo Ackerman

Judge of the United States District Court for the Central District of Illinois
- In office March 31, 1979 – May 28, 1982
- Appointed by: operation of law
- Preceded by: Seat established by 93 Stat. 6
- Succeeded by: Michael M. Mihm

Chief Judge of the United States District Court for the Southern District of Illinois
- In office 1972–1979
- Preceded by: Omer Poos
- Succeeded by: James L. Foreman

Judge of the United States District Court for the Southern District of Illinois
- In office June 12, 1967 – March 31, 1979
- Appointed by: Lyndon B. Johnson
- Preceded by: Frederick Olen Mercer
- Succeeded by: Seat abolished

Mayor of Peoria
- In office 1953–1957
- Preceded by: Joseph O'Neill Malone
- Succeeded by: Eugene L. Leiter

Personal details
- Born: Robert Dale Morgan; May 27, 1912 Peoria, Illinois, U.S.
- Died: May 29, 2002 (aged 90) Peoria, Illinois, U.S.
- Education: Bradley University (B.A.); University of Chicago Law School (J.D.)

Robert Dale Morgan (May 27, 1912 – May 29, 2002) was a United States district judge of the United States District Court for the Central District of Illinois and the United States District Court for the Southern District of Illinois. A member of the Republican Party, he also served as Mayor of Peoria, Illinois, from 1953 to 1957.

== Education and career ==
Born in Peoria, Illinois, he was a direct descendant of the frontiersman David Morgan (1721–1813), a Revolutionary War veteran and a personal friend of George Washington. Through his mother, Eleanor Ellis, he was also descended from Thones Kunders (1653–1729), a German Quaker whose Germantown, Pennsylvania, home was the site of the 1688 Germantown Petition Against Slavery, the first formal antislavery petition in American history.

Morgan received a Bachelor of Arts degree from Bradley University in 1934. He received a J.D. degree from University of Chicago Law School in 1937. He was in private practice of law in Peoria from 1937 to 1942. He was a United States Commissioner of the United States District Court for the Southern District of Illinois from 1938 to 1946. He was in the United States Army from 1942 to 1946. He was in private practice of law in Peoria from 1946 to 1967. He was Mayor of Peoria from 1953 to 1957.

== Military service ==
He served in the United States Army Signal Corps during World War II from 1942 to 1946, attaining the rank of major.

== Mayor of Peoria ==
A member of the Republican Party, Morgan was elected Mayor of Peoria in 1953 and served until 1957, becoming the first mayor under the new council–city manager form of government.

He ran on a reform platform to crack down on gambling and prostitution, which had given Peoria a national reputation as a “wide open” vice city. During his tenure there were two attempts to bomb (dynamite) his home, and he received multiple death threats, widely seen as retaliation for his anti-vice campaigns. Despite this, he continued vice raids and pledged not to back down, earning a reputation locally as a determined reformer.

== Federal judicial service ==
Morgan was nominated by President Lyndon B. Johnson on May 24, 1967, to a seat on the United States District Court for the Southern District of Illinois vacated by Judge Frederick Olen Mercer. He was confirmed by the United States Senate on June 12, 1967, and received his commission the same day. He served as Chief Judge from 1972 to 1979. He was reassigned by operation of law on March 31, 1979, to the United States District Court for the Central District of Illinois to a new seat established by 93 Stat. 6. He served as Chief Judge from 1979 to 1982. He assumed senior status on May 28, 1982. His service was terminated on May 29, 2002, due to his death in Peoria.

== Personal ==
Morgan married Betty Harbers Morgan of Peoria on October 14, 1939; she died in September 2010. They had two sons. He was active in veterans’ organizations, including the American Legion, reflecting his World War II service.

== See also ==
- List of mayors of Peoria, Illinois

== Sources ==
Legal offices
Preceded by Frederick Olen Mercer	Judge of the United States District Court for the Southern District of Illinois; 1967–1979	Succeeded by Seat abolished
Preceded by Omer Poos	Chief Judge of the United States District Court for the Southern District of Illinois; 1972–1979	Succeeded by James L. Foreman
Preceded by Seat established by 93 Stat. 6	Judge of the United States District Court for the Central District of Illinois; 1979–1982	Succeeded by Michael M. Mihm
Preceded by Office established	Chief Judge of the United States District Court for the Central District of Illinois; 1979–1982	Succeeded by J. Waldo Ackerman
