= William George Juergens =

American judge

Senior Judge of the United States District Court for the Southern District of Illinois
- In office March 31, 1979 – December 7, 1988

Senior Judge of the United States District Court for the Eastern District of Illinois
- In office April 26, 1972 – March 31, 1979

Chief Judge of the United States District Court for the Eastern District of Illinois
- In office 1965–1972
- Preceded by: Casper Platt
- Succeeded by: Henry Seiler Wise

Judge of the United States District Court for the Eastern District of Illinois
- In office June 22, 1956 – April 26, 1972
- Appointed by: Dwight D. Eisenhower
- Preceded by: Fred Louis Wham
- Succeeded by: James L. Foreman

Personal details
- Born: William George Juergens; September 7, 1904 Steeleville, Illinois, U.S.
- Died: December 7, 1988 (aged 84)
- Education: Carthage College (AB); University of Michigan (JD)

William George Juergens (September 7, 1904 – December 7, 1988) was an American attorney and jurist who served as a United States district judge of the United States District Court for the Eastern District of Illinois and the United States District Court for the Southern District of Illinois.

== Early life and education ==
Born in Steeleville, Illinois, Juergens received an Artium Baccalaureus degree from Carthage College in 1925 and a Juris Doctor from the University of Michigan Law School in 1928.

== Career ==
He was in private practice in Chester, Illinois from 1928 to 1938, also serving as a city attorney of Chester from 1930 to 1938. He was a county judge of Randolph County, Illinois from 1938 to 1950, and a Circuit Judge of the Third Judicial Circuit of Illinois from 1951 to 1956.

=== Federal judicial service ===
Juergens was nominated by President Dwight D. Eisenhower on June 7, 1956, to a seat on the United States District Court for the Eastern District of Illinois vacated by Judge Fred Louis Wham. He was confirmed by the United States Senate on June 21, 1956, and received his commission the next day. He served as Chief Judge from 1965 to 1972. He assumed senior status on April 26, 1972. Juergens was reassigned by operation of law to the United States District Court for the Southern District of Illinois on March 31, 1979, under the provisions of 92 Stat. 883.

== Death ==
Juergens died on December 7, 1988.

== Sources ==
Legal offices
| Preceded by Fred Louis Wham | Judge of the United States District Court for the Eastern District of Illinois; 1956–1972 | Succeeded by James L. Foreman |
| Preceded by Casper Platt | Chief Judge of the United States District Court for the Eastern District of Illinois; 1965–1972 | Succeeded by Henry Seiler Wise |
