= John T. Rogers (journalist) =

American journalist

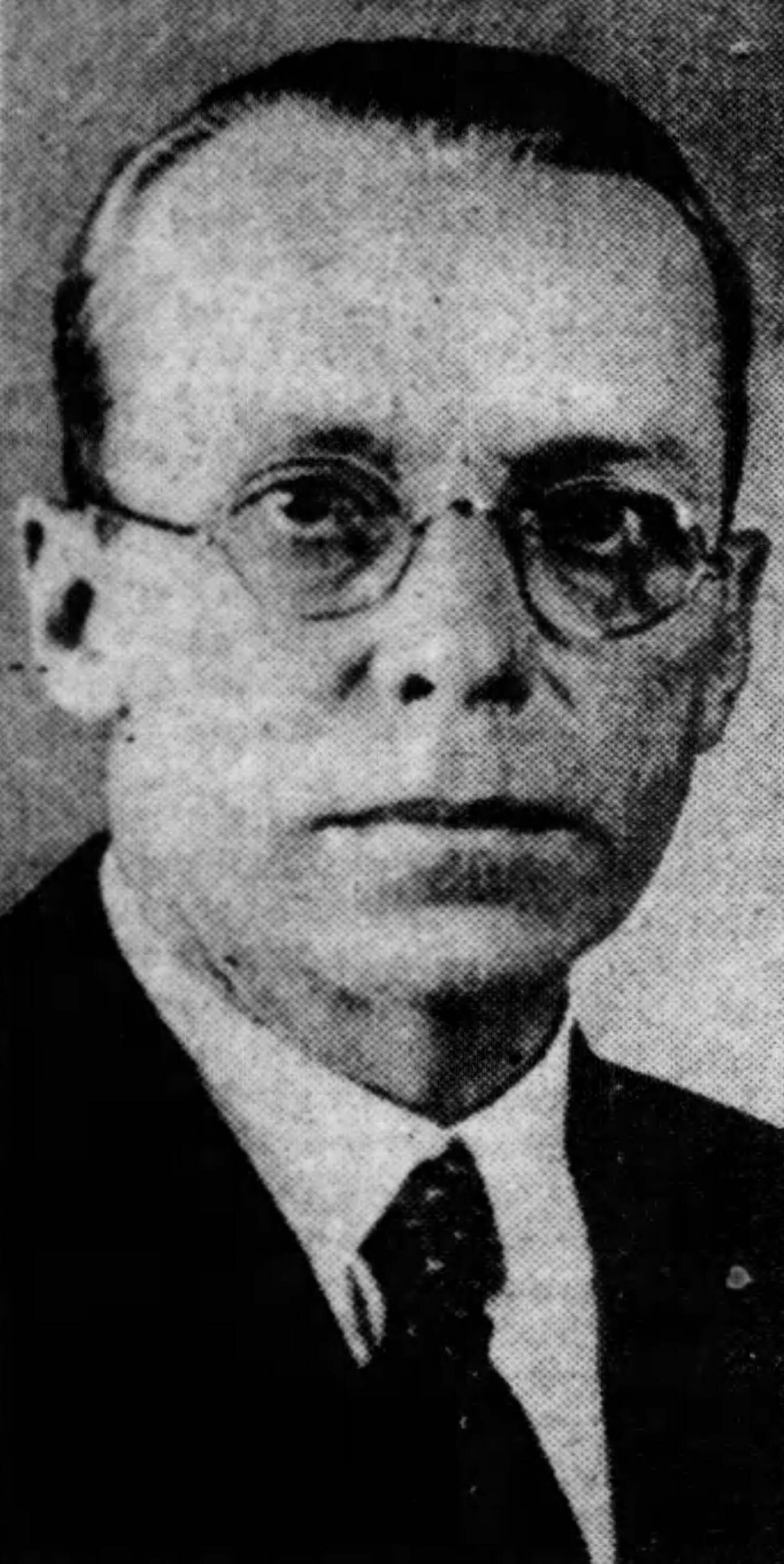
John T. Rogers

John T. Rogers (1881 – 3 March 1937) won the 1927 Pulitzer Prize for Reporting, based on his coverage of the inquiry leading to the impeachment of federal judge George W. English. He was a journalist for the St. Louis Post-Dispatch.

In 1922, the St. Louis Post-Dispatch assigned Rogers to interview Louisiana Governor John. M. Parker in conjunction with his appeal to President Warren G. Harding for federal assistance to investigate the disappearance of two young men on the highway outside of Bastrop, Louisiana. Ku Klux Klan involvement was widely reported in Morehouse Parish. Rogers rapidly expanded his inquiry to include klansmen, witnesses, and victims. While conducting his investigation, two mutilated bodies surfaced in Lake LaFourche after dynamite was detonated near the Nettles ferry barge landing. Autopsies conducted by Tulane University pathologist Charles Duval and Touro Hospital's John Lanford revealed extensive premortem torture, using some sort of industrial mechanized device. Rogers self-published his firsthand account in order to counter pro-KKK circulars that claimed the story was a conspiracy intended to discredit the Second Klan.
