= Lewis L. Boyer =

American politician (1886–1944)

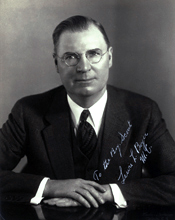

Member of the U.S. House of Representatives from Illinois's 15th district
- In office January 3, 1937 – January 3, 1939
- Preceded by: J. Leroy Adair
- Succeeded by: Robert B. Chiperfield

Personal details
- Born: May 19, 1886 Richfield Township, Illinois
- Died: March 12, 1944 (aged 57) Quincy, Illinois
- Party: Democratic

Lewis Leonard Boyer (May 19, 1886 – March 12, 1944) was a U.S. Representative from Illinois.

Born on a farm near Richfield Township, Illinois, Boyer attended the rural schools. He taught school at Douglas, Franklin, Pin Oak, and Liberty, Illinois from 1904 to 1915, and, while teaching, studied civil engineering. He moved to Quincy, Illinois, in 1915 and engaged in engineering as county superintendent of highways of Adams County, Illinois, from March 1915 until December 1936.

Boyer was elected as a Democrat to the Seventy-fifth Congress (January 3, 1937 – January 3, 1939). He was an unsuccessful candidate for reelection in 1938 to the Seventy-sixth Congress. He was an unsuccessful candidate for the State senate in 1940 and 1942. He died in Quincy, Illinois, March 12, 1944. He was interred in Xander Cemetery, Liberty, Illinois.

U.S. House of Representatives
Preceded by J. Leroy Adair	Member of the U.S. House of Representatives from Illinois's 15th congressional district 1937-1939	Succeeded by Robert B. Chiperfield
