= Franz Seiler =

Swiss lawyer and hotelier (1897–1966)

- Born: 1 May 1897; Brig, Switzerland
- Died: 24 December 1966 (aged 69); Zurich, Switzerland
- Occupations: Lawyer; hotelier
- Spouse: Victorine Vogt
- Children: Alexander J. Seiler
- Father: Alexander Seiler
- Relatives: Theodore E. Seiler (brother)

Franz Seiler (1 May 1897 – 24 December 1966) was a Swiss lawyer and hotelier. From 1926 he was director of the Swiss Hotel Trust Company in Zurich, and from 1945 he was for twenty years the first full-time president of the Swiss Hotel Association. From 1942 to 1966 he chaired the board of directors of Seiler Hotels AG; the restructuring of the family business after the critical war years was largely his achievement.

== Biography ==
Franz Seiler was born on 1 May 1897 in Brig, the son of Alexander Seiler. He was the brother of Theodore E. Seiler and a cousin of Eduard Seiler and Hermann Seiler. He married Victorine Vogt, a physician. His son was the documentary filmmaker Alexander J. Seiler.

Seiler studied in Lausanne and Bern and obtained a doctorate in law. From 1920 to 1922 he was a lawyer and notary in Brig. From 1923 he was a member of the management, and from 1926 director, of the Swiss Hotel Trust Company (Schweizerische Hotel-Treuhandgesellschaft) in Zurich. From 1945 he was for twenty years the first full-time president of the Swiss Hotel Association.

Seiler was a member of the board of directors of Seiler Hotels AG from 1921 to 1938, and its chairman and delegate of the board from 1942 to 1966. In 1951–1952 he was president of the International Hotel Association (Association internationale de l'hôtellerie). Among other bodies, he worked in the Tourism Committee of the OECD, on the board of the Swiss National Tourist Office (Schweizerische Verkehrszentrale) and in the Swiss Chamber of Commerce (Schweizerische Handelskammer). The restructuring of the family business after the critical war years was largely his achievement. He died on 24 December 1966 in Zurich.

== Bibliography ==
- Biographisches Lexikon verstorbener Schweizer, 6, 1969, 445
