= June Kovach =

American-born Swiss film director, film editor and concert pianist

- Born: 1932; Chicago, Illinois, U.S.
- Died: October 30, 2010 (aged 77–78); Zürich, Switzerland
- Occupations: Concert pianist, film director
- Spouse: Alexander J. Seiler

June Kovach (1932 – October 30, 2010) was an American-born Swiss film director, film editor and concert pianist. She was a concert pianist until 1961 when she took to working on documentary films.

== Life ==
Kovach was born in 1932 in Chicago to parents who came from Hungary. Her skills and training made her into a concert pianist. Her concert career started in 1949 and in 1951 she won the piano prize given each year by the Walter W. Naumburg Foundation. Her concert career took her to the UK, the Netherlands, Italy, Austria and Switzerland. From 1961 she put aside concerts and she began to work as a film director with her husband, Alexander J. Seiler. He and Rob Gnant had created the Seiler + Gnant film production company, which they ran from 1963 to 1971. In 1963 their film In Changing Gradients won the Short Film Palme d'Or at the Cannes Film Festival in 1963. Rob Gnant and her husband were credited as directors and Kovach was the editor.

She worked with Rob Gnant and her husband to create the documentary film Siamo Italiani which in 1964 highlighted the discrimination experienced by Italian workers in Switzerland. She co-directed, edited, and wrote the film as well as being the sound engineer. Three years later the trio created another documentary The Music Festival.

In 2003 she was sole director of the film Black Flowers - Gretler's Panoptikum which tells the story of Gretler, a farmer, who was about to retire when he realizes that something strange has occurred when all the flowers in his fields turn black.

Kovach died in Zürich in 2010.

== Selected works ==
1964: Siamo Italiani - The Italians - Documentary, 86 min. By June Kovach, Alexander J. Seiler and Rob Gnant
1966: During the year
1967: Music competition - documentary film, 72 min. By June Kovach, Alexander J. Seiler and Rob Gnant
1967: … via Zurich - documentary, by June Kovach, Alexander J. Seiler and Rob Gnant
1968: Fifteen - documentary, 21 min. By June Kovach, Alexander J. Seiler and Rob Gnant
1974: Whoever Lies Once or Viktor and Upbringing - Documentary, 68 min.
1981: Lust or Gutknecht's Dream - 58 min.
1995: Honeyland - Documentary
2003: Black Flowers - Gretler's Panoptikum
