= J. Leroy Adair =

American judge

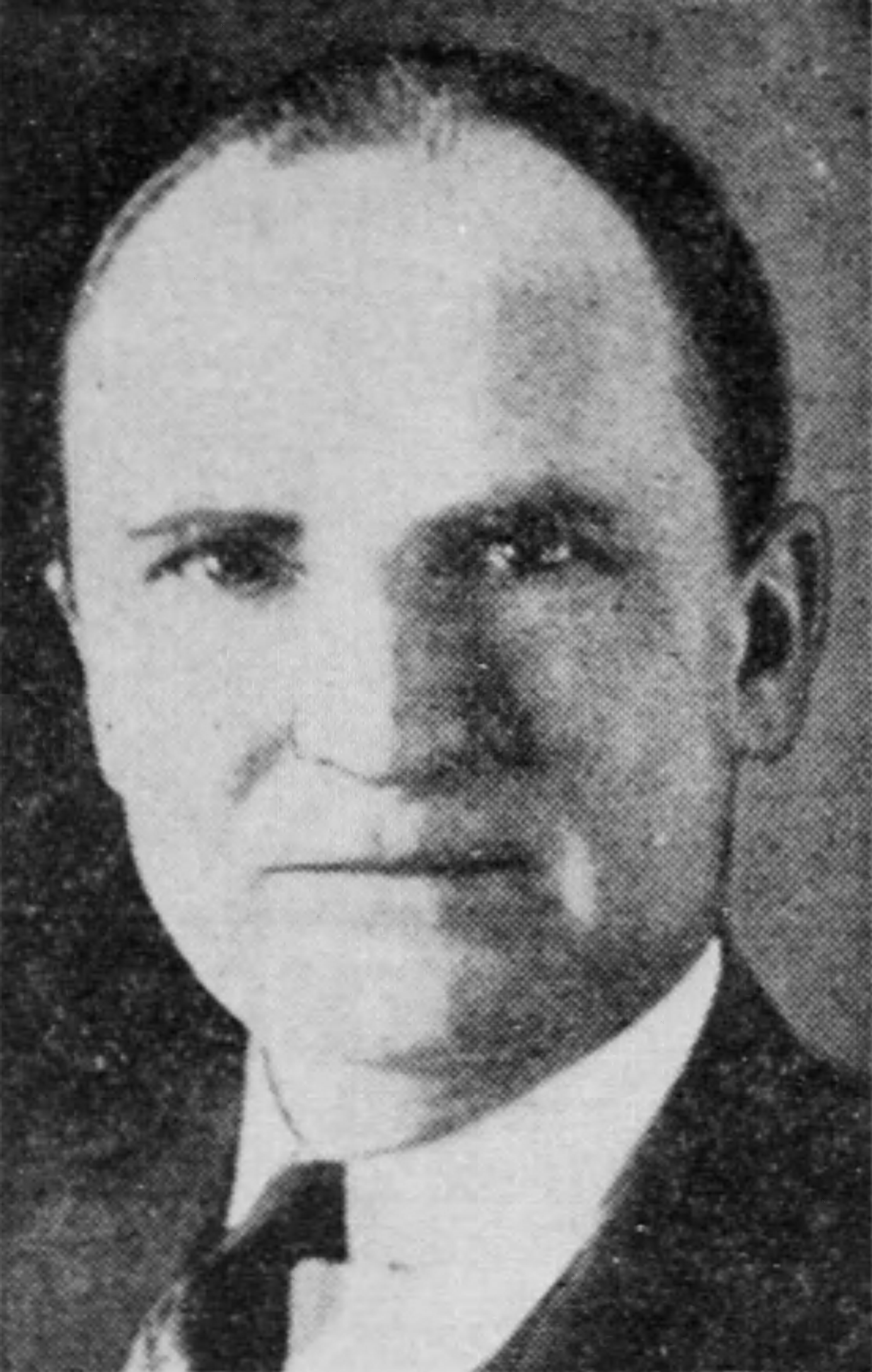

Judge of the United States District Court for the Southern District of Illinois
- In office April 27, 1937 – January 19, 1956
- Appointed by: Franklin D. Roosevelt
- Preceded by: James Earl Major
- Succeeded by: Frederick Olen Mercer

Member of the U.S. House of Representatives from Illinois's 15th district
- In office March 4, 1933 – January 3, 1937
- Preceded by: Burnett M. Chiperfield
- Succeeded by: Lewis L. Boyer

Member of the Illinois Senate from the 36th district
- In office 1928-1932

Personal details
- Born: Jackson Leroy Adair; February 23, 1887 Clayton, Illinois, US
- Died: January 19, 1956 (aged 68) Quincy, Illinois, US
- Resting place: South Side Cemetery; Clayton, Illinois, US
- Party: Democratic
- Education: University of Michigan Law School (LL.B.)

Jackson Leroy Adair (February 23, 1887 – January 19, 1956) was a United States representative from Illinois and a United States district judge of the United States District Court for the Southern District of Illinois.

== Education and career ==
Adair was born in Clayton, Illinois, attending public high school, and Illinois College in Jacksonville, Illinois. He graduated from the University of Michigan Law School in 1911 with a Bachelor of Laws. He was admitted to the bar the same year and commenced practice in Muskogee, Oklahoma. He moved to Quincy, Illinois, in 1913 and continued the practice of law. He also engaged in agricultural pursuits and in the manufacture of medicine for livestock. He served as city attorney of Quincy from 1914 to 1916. He served as prosecuting attorney of Adams County, Illinois, from 1916 to 1920 and from 1924 to 1928. He was in private practice in Adams County from 1920 to 1924. He served as a member of the Illinois Senate from 1928 to 1932, from the 36th District.

== Congressional service ==
Adair was elected as a Democrat to the 73rd and 74th United States Congresses, serving from March 4, 1933, to January 3, 1937. He was not a candidate for renomination in 1936.

== Federal judicial service ==
Adair was nominated by President Franklin D. Roosevelt on March 24, 1937, to a seat on the United States District Court for the Southern District of Illinois vacated by Judge James Earl Major. He was confirmed by the United States Senate on April 20, 1937, and received his commission on April 27, 1937. His service terminated on January 19, 1956, due to his death in Quincy. He was interred in South Side Cemetery in Clayton.

U.S. House of Representatives
| Preceded by Burnett M. Chiperfield | Member of the U.S. House of Representatives from Illinois's 15th congressional district 1933–1937 | Succeeded by Lewis L. Boyer |
Legal offices
| Preceded by James Earl Major | Judge of the United States District Court for the Southern District of Illinois; 1937–1956 | Succeeded by Frederick Olen Mercer |
