= Casper Platt =

American judge

Chief Judge of the United States District Court for the Eastern District of Illinois
- In office 1956–1965
- Preceded by: Fred Louis Wham
- Succeeded by: William George Juergens

Judge of the United States District Court for the Eastern District of Illinois
- In office October 13, 1949 – September 16, 1965
- Appointed by: Harry S. Truman
- Preceded by: Walter C. Lindley
- Succeeded by: Henry Seiler Wise

Personal details
- Born: Casper Platt; June 6, 1892 Danville, Illinois, U.S.
- Died: September 16, 1965 (aged 73)
- Education: University of Illinois at Urbana–Champaign (B.A.); University of Chicago Law School (J.D.)

Casper Platt (June 6, 1892 – September 16, 1965) was a United States district judge of the United States District Court for the Eastern District of Illinois.

== Education and career ==
Born in Danville, Illinois, Platt received a Bachelor of Arts degree from the University of Illinois at Urbana–Champaign in 1914 and a J.D. degree from the University of Chicago Law School in 1916. He was in private practice in Danville from 1916 to 1917, and was in the United States Army during World War I from 1917 to 1918. After the war, he returned to private practice in Danville until 1933, also working as a city attorney for Danville from 1927 to 1928. He was a Judge of the Fifth Circuit Court of Illinois from 1933 to 1949.

== Federal judicial service ==
On September 15, 1949, Platt was nominated by President Harry S. Truman to a seat on the United States District Court for the Eastern District of Illinois vacated by Judge Walter C. Lindley. Platt was confirmed by the United States Senate on October 12, 1949, and received his commission on October 13, 1949. He served as Chief Judge from 1956 until his death on September 16, 1965.

== See also ==
- List of Jewish American jurists

== Sources ==
Legal offices
Preceded by Walter C. Lindley	Judge of the United States District Court for the Eastern District of Illinois; 1949–1965	Succeeded by Henry Seiler Wise
Preceded by Fred Louis Wham	Chief Judge of the United States District Court for the Eastern District of Illinois; 1956–1965	Succeeded by William George Juergens
