= George W. English =

United States federal judge

George English
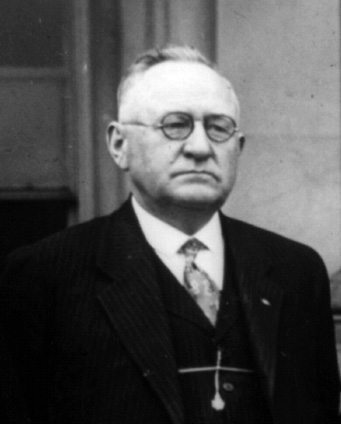

Judge of the United States District Court for the Eastern District of Illinois
- In office May 3, 1918 – November 4, 1926
- Appointed by: Woodrow Wilson
- Preceded by: Francis Marion Wright
- Succeeded by: Fred Louis Wham

Member of the Illinois House of Representatives
- In office 1907–1912

Personal details
- Born: George Washington English; May 9, 1866 Vienna, Illinois, U.S.
- Died: July 19, 1941 (aged 75) Fort Lauderdale, Florida, U.S.
- Party: Democratic
- Education: Illinois Wesleyan University (LLB)

George Washington English (May 9, 1866 – July 19, 1941) was a United States district judge of the United States District Court for the Eastern District of Illinois. Charged with abuse of power and other offenses, English was impeached by the United States House of Representatives on April 1, 1926, and resigned his position before proceedings could continue.

== Education and career ==
Born on May 9, 1866, near Vienna, Illinois, English received a Bachelor of Laws in 1891 from the now defunct law school at Illinois Wesleyan University. He was chief deputy sheriff of Johnson County, Illinois from 1891 to 1892. He entered private practice in Vienna from 1893 to 1912. He served as city attorney of Vienna. He was a member of the Illinois House of Representatives from 1907 to 1912. He continued private practice in Centralia, Illinois from 1912 to 1914. He was a special income tax attorney for the United States Department of the Treasury from 1914 to 1918.

== Federal judicial service ==
English was nominated by President Woodrow Wilson on April 22, 1918, to a seat on the United States District Court for the Eastern District of Illinois vacated by Judge Francis Marion Wright. He was confirmed by the United States Senate on May 3, 1918, and received his commission the same day.

=== Impeachment and resignation ===
English's service terminated on November 4, 1926, due to his resignation, after being impeached by the United States House of Representatives on April 1, 1926.

In March, 1926, the House Judiciary Committee voted 15–6 to recommend English's impeachment. A subcommittee of the Judiciary Committee was appointed to write articles of impeachment. The House voted to impeach by a vote of 306–60, on April 1, 1926.

The five articles of English's impeachment were:

- Tyranny and oppression, and abuse of the powers of his office.
- Partiality and favoritism, particularly to Charles B. Thomas, his referee in bankruptcy, to whom he was “under great obligation financial and otherwise.”
- Improper and unlawful conduct in connection with a “bankruptcy ring” operating in his district.
- Manipulation of bankruptcy and other funds, in conjunction with his referee in bankruptcy, for the pecuniary benefit of the referee, himself and his son.
- A general course of conduct constituting misbehavior and misdemeanor in office.

An impeachment trial was preliminarily begun, but ended before full-blown proceedings were initiated and without a verdict, with the Senate dismissing impeachment charges at the House's request after English resigned from his office. He had been accused of abusive treatment of attorneys and litigants appearing before him.

=== Coverage ===
John T. Rogers of St. Louis Post-Dispatch won the 1927 Pulitzer Prize for Reporting with his coverage of the inquiry leading to English's impeachment.

== Death ==
English died on July 19, 1941, in Fort Lauderdale, Florida. He was interred in Evergreen Cemetery in Fort Lauderdale.

== Sources ==
- Justice Learning Timeline
- The New York Times, November 5, 1926

Legal offices
Preceded by Francis Marion Wright	Judge of the United States District Court for the Eastern District of Illinois; 1918–1926	Succeeded by Fred Louis Wham
