= Omer Poos =

American judge

Senior Judge of the United States District Court for the Southern District of Illinois
- In office August 31, 1973 – August 11, 1976

Chief Judge of the United States District Court for the Southern District of Illinois
- In office 1966–1972
- Preceded by: Frederick Olen Mercer
- Succeeded by: Robert Dale Morgan

Judge of the United States District Court for the Southern District of Illinois
- In office August 21, 1958 – August 31, 1973
- Appointed by: Dwight D. Eisenhower
- Preceded by: Charles Guy Briggle
- Succeeded by: Harlington Wood Jr.

Personal details
- Born: Omer Poos; August 22, 1902 Mount Olive, Illinois
- Died: August 11, 1976 (aged 73)
- Education: Saint Louis University School of Law (LL.B.)

Omer Poos (August 22, 1902 – August 11, 1976) was a United States district judge of the United States District Court for the Southern District of Illinois.

== Education and career ==
Born in Mount Olive, Illinois, Poos received a Bachelor of Laws from Saint Louis University School of Law in 1924. He was in private practice in Mount Olive from 1924 to 1939, and then in Hillsboro, Illinois until 1958.

== Federal judicial service ==
On August 16, 1958, Poos was nominated by President Dwight D. Eisenhower to a seat on the United States District Court for the Southern District of Illinois vacated by Judge Charles Guy Briggle. Poos was confirmed by the United States Senate on August 19, 1958, and received his commission on August 21, 1958. He served as Chief Judge from 1966 to 1972, assuming senior status on August 31, 1973. Poos served in that capacity until his death on August 11, 1976.

== Death ==
Poos died on August 11, 1976 at a Hillsboro hospital at the age of 73.

== Sources ==
Legal offices
Preceded by Charles Guy Briggle	Judge of the United States District Court for the Southern District of Illinois; 1958–1973	Succeeded by Harlington Wood Jr.
Preceded by Frederick Olen Mercer	Chief Judge of the United States District Court for the Southern District of Illinois; 1966–1972	Succeeded by Robert Dale Morgan
