= Seyler =

Seyler is a surname, and may refer to:

- Seyler family, a Swiss-German family of artists and bankers, including
  - Abel Seyler (1730–1801), Swiss theatre director
  - Friederike Sophie Seyler (1737/38–1789), German actress and librettist
  - Ludwig Edwin Seyler (1758–1836), German banker
  - Seyler theatrical company
  - Berenberg-Gossler-Seyler banking dynasty
- Athene Seyler (1889–1990), English actress
- Harry E. Seyler (1908–1994), American politician and educator
- Tomas Seyler (born 1974), German darts player

== See also ==
- Hoppe-Seyler
- Seiler
- Sailer (disambiguation)
