= James L. Foreman =

American judge

Senior Judge of the United States District Court for the Southern District of Illinois
- In office June 1, 1992 – June 3, 2012

Chief Judge of the United States District Court for the Southern District of Illinois
- In office 1979–1992
- Preceded by: Robert Dale Morgan
- Succeeded by: William Donald Stiehl

Judge of the United States District Court for the Southern District of Illinois
- In office March 31, 1979 – June 1, 1992
- Appointed by: operation of law
- Preceded by: Seat established by 93 Stat. 6
- Succeeded by: John Phil Gilbert

Chief Judge of the United States District Court for the Eastern District of Illinois
- In office 1978–1979
- Preceded by: Henry Seiler Wise
- Succeeded by: Office abolished

Judge of the United States District Court for the Eastern District of Illinois
- In office March 7, 1972 – March 31, 1979
- Appointed by: Richard Nixon
- Preceded by: William George Juergens
- Succeeded by: Seat abolished

Personal details
- Born: James L. Foreman; May 12, 1927 Metropolis, Illinois, U.S.
- Died: June 3, 2012 (aged 85) Paducah, Kentucky, U.S.
- Education: University of Illinois at Urbana–Champaign (B.S.); University of Illinois College of Law (J.D.)

James L. Foreman (May 12, 1927 – June 3, 2012) was a United States district judge of the United States District Court for the Eastern District of Illinois and of the United States District Court for the Southern District of Illinois.

== Education and career ==
Born in Metropolis, Illinois, Foreman was in the United States Navy from 1945 to 1946. He received a Bachelor of Science degree from the University of Illinois at Urbana–Champaign in 1950, and a Juris Doctor from the University of Illinois College of Law in 1952. From 1952 to 1972, he was in private practice in Metropolis. He was the assistant state attorney general of Illinois from 1953 to 1960, and then a state's attorney of Massac County, Illinois until 1964.

== Federal judicial service ==
On February 16, 1972, Foreman was nominated by President Richard Nixon to a seat on the United States District Court for the Eastern District of Illinois vacated by Judge William George Juergens. Foreman was confirmed by the United States Senate on March 2, 1972, and received his commission on March 7, 1972. He served as Chief Judge from 1978 until March 31, 1979, when the districts of Illinois were reorganized and he was reassigned by operation of law to the United States District Court for the Southern District of Illinois. He then served as Chief Judge of his new district until 1992, assuming senior status on June 1, 1992, and assuming inactive senior status May 12, 2007. He died on June 3, 2012, in Paducah, Kentucky.

== Sources ==
Legal offices
| Preceded by William George Juergens | Judge of the United States District Court for the Eastern District of Illinois; 1972–1979 | Succeeded by Seat abolished |
| Preceded by Henry Seiler Wise | Chief Judge of the United States District Court for the Eastern District of Illinois; 1978–1979 | Succeeded by Office abolished |
| Preceded by Seat established by 93 Stat. 6 | Judge of the United States District Court for the Southern District of Illinois; 1979–1992 | Succeeded by John Phil Gilbert |
| Preceded by Robert Dale Morgan | Chief Judge of the United States District Court for the Southern District of Illinois; 1979–1992 | Succeeded by William Donald Stiehl |
