= Frederick Olen Mercer =

American judge

Chief Judge of the United States District Court for the Southern District of Illinois
- In office 1958–1966
- Preceded by: Charles Guy Briggle
- Succeeded by: Omer Poos

Judge of the United States District Court for the Southern District of Illinois
- In office June 19, 1956 – April 3, 1966
- Appointed by: Dwight D. Eisenhower
- Preceded by: J. Leroy Adair
- Succeeded by: Robert Dale Morgan

Personal details
- Born: Frederick Olen Mercer; March 11, 1901 Vermont, Illinois
- Died: April 3, 1966 (aged 65)
- Education: University of Illinois, Urbana-Champaign (LL.B.)

Frederick Olen Mercer (March 11, 1901 – April 3, 1966) was a United States district judge of the United States District Court for the Southern District of Illinois.

== Education and career ==
Born in Vermont, Illinois, Mercer received a Bachelor of Laws from the University of Illinois College of Law in 1924. He was an assistant state's attorney of Fulton County, Illinois from 1924 to 1926. He was a county judge of Fulton County from 1926 to 1934. He was in private practice in Lewistown, Illinois from 1934 to 1940. He was in private practice in Canton, Illinois from 1940 to 1956.

== Federal judicial service ==
Mercer was nominated by President Dwight D. Eisenhower on May 17, 1956, to a seat on the United States District Court for the Southern District of Illinois vacated by Judge J. Leroy Adair. He was confirmed by the United States Senate on June 13, 1956, and received his commission on June 19, 1956. He served as Chief Judge from 1958 to 1966. Mercer served in that capacity until his death on April 3, 1966.

== Sources ==
Legal offices
Preceded by J. Leroy Adair	Judge of the United States District Court for the Southern District of Illinois; 1956–1966	Succeeded by Robert Dale Morgan
Preceded by Charles Guy Briggle	Chief Judge of the United States District Court for the Southern District of Illinois; 1958–1966	Succeeded by Omer Poos
