= Fred Louis Wham =

American judge

Senior Judge of the United States District Court for the Eastern District of Illinois
- In office March 3, 1956 – February 2, 1967

Chief Judge of the United States District Court for the Eastern District of Illinois
- In office 1949–1956
- Preceded by: Office established
- Succeeded by: Casper Platt

Judge of the United States District Court for the Eastern District of Illinois
- In office March 1, 1927 – March 3, 1956
- Appointed by: Calvin Coolidge
- Preceded by: George W. English
- Succeeded by: William George Juergens

Personal details
- Born: Fred Louis Wham; June 15, 1884 Marion County, Illinois, U.S.
- Died: February 2, 1967 (aged 82)
- Education: University of Illinois College of Law (LL.B.)

Fred Louis Wham (June 15, 1884 – February 2, 1967) was a United States district judge of the United States District Court for the Eastern District of Illinois.

== Education and career ==
Born in Marion County, Illinois, Wham received a Bachelor of Laws from the University of Illinois College of Law in 1909. He was in private practice in Fort Smith and Fayetteville, Arkansas from 1909 to 1915. He was an Assistant Solicitor in the United States Department of Agriculture in Washington, D.C. from 1915 to 1917. He was in private practice in Centralia, Illinois from 1917 to 1927.

== Federal judicial service ==
On February 26, 1927, Wham was nominated by President Calvin Coolidge to a seat on the United States District Court for the Eastern District of Illinois vacated by Judge George W. English. Wham was confirmed by the United States Senate on March 1, 1927, and received his commission the same day. He served as Chief Judge from 1949 to 1956, assuming senior status on March 3, 1956, and serving in that capacity until his death on February 2, 1967.

== Sources ==
Legal offices
Preceded by George W. English	Judge of the United States District Court for the Eastern District of Illinois; 1927–1956	Succeeded by William George Juergens
Preceded by Office established	Chief Judge of the United States District Court for the Eastern District of Illinois; 1949–1956	Succeeded by Casper Platt
