= Leonard V. Finder =

American lawyer (1910–1969)

Leonard Victor Finder (June 27, 1910 – July 3, 1969) was an American lawyer and newspaper editor and publisher.

== Early career ==
Leonard Finder was born in Chicago and graduated at the top of his class from the University of Illinois College of Law in 1933. He practiced law in Chicago from 1933 to 1938, then helped establish the Anti-Defamation League office in NYC before starting a public relations firm in New York City in 1944. During the 1950s he was a senior VP for the Universal Match Corporation in St. Louis, Missouri.

== Newspaper career ==
From 1947 to 1951 he was publisher for the Manchester Evening-Leader, where he became friends with General Dwight D. Eisenhower and an early supporter of his candidacy. In 1962 he became editor and publisher for the Sacramento Union. Despite that brief tenure, he twice won the top award for a California editorial writer, in support of civil rights and against real estate redlining of minorities. The year in-between those awards he was runner-up, highest that could be achieved since there was a policy that no newspaper could win in consecutive years. After being forced from the Sacramento Union in 1966 by a hostile takeover by the Copleys (who ran the San Diego Union, at the time the most right wing daily paper in the country), he devoted his time to lecturing and writing—lecturing primarily at the University of California at Davis and, following a world tour in 1966, working on a book manuscript entitled "Reflections in Asia" as well as numerous newspaper and magazine articles. During this period he was also active in the California Republican Party and the Republican Council, The National Council on Crime and Delinquency, the Sacramento Area Mental Health Association, and the Sacramento Committee for Peace in the Middle East. His papers are archived at the Eisenhower Presidential Library and at UC Davis.
