= Seiler Instrument & Mfg. Co. =

Seiler Instrument & Mfg. Co. is a manufacturer specializing in optical fire control equipment as well as a major distributor of surveying software and instruments, microscopes, and Zeiss planetariums. There are several main divisions within the company which include Manufacturing, Geospatial-Survey, Medical, Seiler Design Solutions, LLC., GeoDrones and Planetarium. The company is headquartered in St. Louis, Missouri with Geospatial-Survey sales offices located in Kansas, Kentucky, Iowa, Illinois, Indiana, Michigan, Nebraska.

== History ==
Seiler Instrument was founded in 1945 by Eric H. Seiler and his wife Dora L. Seiler. Seiler had been trained in the field of optical design and construction by the Zeiss Jena School of Fine Optics in Jena, Germany. He had originally worked for Zeiss Jena, the first incarnation of what is now Carl Zeiss AG, but continued to work in the optical field for the David White company in Wisconsin after emigrating to the United States. Seiler began his own optical company at 922 Pine Street which specialized in repairing existing survey instruments. Since this time, the company's focus has shifted toward designing or retailing survey, military, medical, and planetarium systems.

In 2009 Seiler Instrument & Mfg. Co., Inc. relocated their Corporate Headquarters, along with their Manufacturing, Survey and Microscope divisions in Webster Groves, Missouri to a single 148,000 square foot facility located in Tree Court Industrial Park in Kirkwood, Missouri. The move combines all of Seiler’s unique multiple disciplines under one location.

In 2010, Seiler Instrument admitted that some parts were improperly certified as compliant with the Buy American Act. The pretrial diversion agreement stated that Seiler would pay $1,500,000.00 in forfeiture. The agreement reflects that Seiler Instrument took measures to fix the problems and has agreed to a compliance program to be monitored by the Department of Defense.

In 2021, Seiler Instrument was awarded a maximum $23,475,982 firm-fixed-price, indefinite-delivery/indefinite-quantity contract for M119A1 Light Towed Howitzer panoramic telescopes.

In 2022, Seiler Instrument acquired the assets of Precision Midwest to provide Trimble Geospatial products for the state of Iowa, all of northern Illinois, and the northwest counties of Lake and Porter, Indiana.

== Manufacturing ==
Seiler Instrument’s Manufacturing Division specializes in manufacturing precision optical instruments and components primarily for the United States Military. Seiler is the Original Equipment Manufacturer of the optical fire control used on all United States howitzer and mortar systems as well as many howitzer systems used around the world. From start to finish, Seiler is responsible for the machining, assembly, and testing of all components of the optical fire control system. Along with manufacturing optical instrument assemblies, Seiler also specializes in refurbishing artillery optical fire control equipment which can extend the life of a weapon system.

== Geospatial-Survey ==
Seiler Instrument’s Geospatial-Survey Division is segmented into various industries: Survey, Transportation, Utilities, Engineering, Mapping GIS/GPS and more. Seiler specializes in product sales, training, implementation, support, rentals, and repairs. Seiler is an Autodesk Gold Partner, Autodesk Training Center, There are ten office locations across the Midwestern United States. Seiler Instrument is also a Trimble Preferred Service Provider with authorized service and repair centers located in St. Louis, Indianapolis, and Milwaukee.

=== Seiler Design Solutions, LLC ===
Seiler Design Solutions provides architecture, engineering, and construction software with sales, training, technical support, and implementation, as a Autodesk Gold Partner and Bluebeam Gold Partner. Also, under this umbrella falls the Seiler GeoDrones business segment, providing custom drones for those who are focused on Geospatial (Survey/GIS) applications, including agriculture, forensics, inspection, mapping/survey, mining, construction, and public safety.

== Medical ==
Seiler Instrument’s Medical Division was created in 1950 when Seiler formed an agreement with Carl Zeiss (Jena) to distribute their microscope line in North America. After many successful years as a North American dealer for Zeiss, Seiler and Zeiss parted ways. This split allowed Seiler to create a new microscope to compete with the Zeiss product line and to develop partnerships in Germany, South America, and Asia. Seiler’s Microscope Division provides optics and services to the medical and dental industry. Seiler offers a line of medical microscope products including: Colposcopes, Ear Nose and Throat (ENT), Audiology, Compound and Laboratory Microscopes, Multidisciplinary Surgery Microscopes and Surgical Loupes. They also offer dental microscopy products including: Surgical Microscopes, Dental Loupes, Loupe Lights, and Dental Stools.

== Planetarium ==
In 1987, Seiler Instrument and Carl Zeiss reunited through their planetarium line, and the Seiler Instrument Planetarium Division was created. Seiler Instrument is the sole distributor and first point of contact for sales, service, and repairs on all Carl Zeiss Planetariums in the United States and Canada. Over 600 Zeiss Planetariums around the world have been installed to date for the purposes of simulation, education, and entertainment. Seiler has installed and serviced these projectors in planetariums and science centers such as the Noble Planetarium at the Fort Worth Museum of Science and History.
