= Harlington Wood Jr. =

American judge (1920–2008)

Senior Judge of the United States Court of Appeals for the Seventh Circuit
- In office January 15, 1992 – December 29, 2008

Judge of the United States Court of Appeals for the Seventh Circuit
- In office May 7, 1976 – January 15, 1992
- Appointed by: Gerald Ford
- Preceded by: John Paul Stevens
- Succeeded by: Ilana Rovner

Judge of the United States District Court for the Southern District of Illinois
- In office July 18, 1973 – May 28, 1976
- Appointed by: Richard Nixon
- Preceded by: Omer Poos
- Succeeded by: J. Waldo Ackerman

United States Assistant Attorney General for the Civil Division
- In office 1972–1973
- President: Richard Nixon
- Preceded by: L. Patrick Gray
- Succeeded by: Carla Anderson Hills

United States Attorney for the Southern District of Illinois
- In office 1958–1961
- President: Dwight Eisenhower

Personal details
- Born: Harlington Wood Jr. April 17, 1920 Springfield, Illinois, U.S.
- Died: December 29, 2008 (aged 88) Petersburg, Illinois, U.S.
- Education: University of Illinois at Urbana–Champaign (AB, JD)
- Website: www.harlingtonwoodjr.com

Harlington Wood Jr. (April 17, 1920 – December 29, 2008) was an American lawyer, jurist, political figure and an amateur actor. He served as a United States circuit judge of the United States Court of Appeals for the Seventh Circuit from 1976 until his death in 2008, after earlier serving as a United States district judge of the United States District Court for the Southern District of Illinois. He was considered one of the country's leading legal historians on the life and legacy of former lawyer and United States President Abraham Lincoln, but is perhaps best known for his involvement as an Assistant Attorney General for the United States Department of Justice in two separate Native American armed protests: the first being the occupation at Alcatraz Island, in San Francisco Bay, from 1969 through the summer of 1971, and the second being the Wounded Knee incident in 1973 at Wounded Knee, South Dakota. His accomplishments and impact as both jurist and statesman included participation in many recent events around the world, which he circled three times, including Russia, Outer Mongolia, Europe, Cambodia, Greenland, China, Japan and South America.

== Early life and education ==
Wood was born in Springfield, Illinois, the son of Harlington Wood Sr., a lawyer who also served as a Sangamon County, Illinois, judge for sixteen years. He earned his Artium Baccalaureus degree in 1942 from the University of Illinois at Urbana–Champaign. He served in the United States Army during World War II, attaining the rank of Major, and was present at the signing of the surrender of Tomoyuki Yamashita and Vice Admiral Denhici Okochi, Commander of the Japanese Navy in the Philippines, where they gave up the entire Imperial Japanese Armed Forces to American authorities at the High Commissioner's Residence in Camp John Hay in Baguio, Philippines on September 3, 1945, marking the end of World War II. Upon returning from the Pacific, Wood entered law school at the University of Illinois College of Law at Champaign, graduating in 1948 with a Juris Doctor. After passing the bar, he went into private practice in Springfield, Illinois, with his father, from 1948 to 1958.

== Legal career ==
In 1958, Wood was appointed United States Attorney for the southern district of Illinois by President Dwight D. Eisenhower. He returned to private practice in Springfield, from 1961 to 1968. In 1969 he was named Director of the Executive Office for United States Attorneys in the United States Department of Justice in Washington, D.C. In 1972 he was appointed Assistant Attorney General for the Civil Division of the Department of Justice by President Richard Nixon. During his time in the Department of Justice he was given many special assignments specifically dealing with issues of peacekeeping in locations around the United States: Wounded Knee; Culebra; Alcatraz; anti-war demonstrations in Washington, D.C.; and national political nominating conventions in Miami, Florida.

=== Wounded Knee ===
On Feb. 27, 1973, almost two hundred armed Oglala Sioux from the Pine Ridge Indian Reservation with members of an activist group, the American Indian Movement (AIM), took over the reservation town of Wounded Knee, the site of a massacre in 1890 of three hundred Sioux by American soldiers. Their stated intent was to focus attention to what they considered government mistreatment of Indians, corruption within the Bureau of Indian Affairs and the tribal government's complicity in discrimination. United States marshals and American troops subsequently surrounded the town, and for ten weeks the two sides traded intermittent gunfire, and two Sioux were killed. On March 13, Wood — then assistant attorney general for the Civil Division of the US Justice Department — became the first government official who was allowed to enter Wounded Knee, under armed escort of residents of the reservation. He met with AIM leaders for two hours and, while he shortly thereafter became ill and did not conclude the negotiation, he is credited as the "icebreaker" between the government and AIM. The stand-off ended in an agreement on May 6 to end the occupation without further bloodshed.

== Federal judicial service ==
Wood was nominated by President Richard Nixon on May 11, 1973, to a seat on the United States District Court for the Southern District of Illinois vacated by Judge Omer Poos. He was confirmed by the United States Senate on July 13, 1973, and received his commission on July 18, 1973. His service was terminated on May 28, 1976, due to elevation to the Seventh Circuit.

Wood was nominated by President Gerald Ford on April 14, 1976, to a seat on the United States Court of Appeals for the Seventh Circuit vacated by Judge John Paul Stevens. He was confirmed by the Senate on May 6, 1976, and received his commission on May 7, 1976. He assumed senior status on January 15, 1992, serving in that status until his death, though he did not hear cases after 2003.

Wood served on United States Judicial Conference Committees dealing with Bankruptcy Legislation, Court Administration, Automation, and Long Range Planning for the Federal Judiciary. He received United States Department of State and United States Information Agency assignments to Mexico, Russia, and Romania. Wood served as an adjunct professor at University of Illinois College of Law and as a distinguished visiting professor at St. Louis University School of Law.

=== Legal decisions ===
In the 1977 appellate case of Stump v. Sparkman, Judge Luther Swygert, writing for a panel including Judge Wood as well as Judge William G. East and himself, found that judicial immunity is available only when a judge has jurisdiction over the subject-matter of a case and that it is not available when he acts in "clear absence of all jurisdiction." Although Indiana statute law permitted the sterilization of institutionalized persons under certain circumstances, it provided for the right to notice, the opportunity to defend and the right to appeal. The Court of Appeals found no basis in statutory or common law for a court to order the sterilization of a minor child simply upon a parent's petition. It also held that Judge Stump's action could not be justified as a valid exercise of the power of courts to fashion new common law. In 1978, the United States Supreme Court reversed the Seventh Circuit's decision.

== Personal life ==
"Woody" to his friends, Wood was often referred to as "Lincolnesque" in appearance and demeanor. In 1952, he was chosen to portray Abraham Lincoln in a professional theatrical production of Kermit Hunter's Forever This Land in nearby New Salem, despite being an untrained amateur. More surprisingly, the production was attended by esteemed politicians of the day, such as Illinois Senator Scott W. Lucas, Vice President Alben W. Barkley, Wood (in Lincoln theatrical makeup) and Illinois Governor Adlai Stevenson. The play was reviewed by esteemed film critic Brooks Atkinson of The New York Times, who wrote favorably of both it and its star.

The part of Lincoln is played modestly and honestly by Harlington Wood Jr., a tall, loose-jointed young lawyer in Springfield ... (who) seems to be using his voice unnaturally, striving after an effect that he does not entirely achieve. But according to historians in the neighborhood, his manner, his height, his weight and his appearance are remarkably authentic for the part; and his performance solves happily the greatest problem in a Lincoln play.

=== Death ===
Wood stopped hearing cases in 2003, and lived in a convalescent facility until his death on December 29, 2008, in Petersburg, Illinois.

== Legacy ==
Fellow appellate judge William J. Bauer notes that Wood "was simply a very good judge; he didn't lean to one side or the other" He further reflected that "every case he wrote, he wrote very well."

U.S. Senator Dick Durbin (D-Ill.) recalled:

My first solo jury trial in the United States District Court in Springfield, Illinois was before Judge Harlington Wood Jr. No nervous young attorney could have drawn a better venue. He was fair and patient and softened the embarrassment of my rookie mistakes in his courtroom. Riding An Unmarked Trail with Judge Wood will take you from the ROTC horse cavalry at the University of Illinois to tense negotiations at Wounded Knee. From a law practice in Springfield, his life story takes us on far-flung adventures and reaches the highest levels of the Department of Justice in Washington. Long and lean with a sparkle in his eye and a wry grin, Harlington Wood has left his mark not just on this attorney, but on our nation. Abe Lincoln is his hero and Wood played him convincingly in local theatre. But his connection with that great Prairie lawyer is more than just a dramatic pose. Harlington Wood's public life brought that great Lincoln tradition to his courtrooms and to all who were fortunate to share his journey.

As well, Circuit Judge and legal author Richard A. Posner notes in the foreword for Wood's posthumously published book, An Unmarked Trail:

Harlington and I have been colleagues on the Seventh Circuit for many years, but until I read his fascinating memoir I had only a dim idea of his extraordinary life, including distinguished service in World War II and his decisive contribution on behalf of the Justice Department in resolving the Wounded Knee crisis in 1973. Nor had I realized what an extraordinary world traveler Harlington was — how intrepid, resilient and adventurous. His modesty is excessive, but cannot quite conceal his sterling character and a life of great public service seasoned with excitement.

Alison Davis Wood (no relation), a producer at WILL-TV (PBS), noted that Wood demonstrated "how great men can live among us in quiet unassuming ways. She remarks that his life was a "true reflection of the American Dream — a Midwestern boy's own desire for adventure takes him around the world and back".

Wood traveled extensively, including three trips around the world, five trips to the former Soviet Union and one trip to Russia. During some of those travels, he worked with foreign judges in former Iron Curtain countries, helping them establish democratic legal systems.

He was a former president of the Abraham Lincoln Association and former chairman of the Lincoln Legal Papers research project.

Judge Wood's papers are held by the Illinois History and Lincoln Collections at the University of Illinois Library at Urbana-Champaign.

== Articles and briefs authored ==
- "Composition and Procedure Before International Criminal Court," World Peace Through Law Center, 1970
- "The Crooked Christmas Tree," 1993
- "Judiciary Reform," American University Law Review 44(5): June 1995
- "Last Look," American Heritage (New Series) 50(2): Apr. 1999 [Stalin article]
- "Leader of the Seventh," Journal of Contemporary Health Law and Policy 17(1): 2000 Judge Richard Posner tribute
- "Real Judges," New York University Annual Survey of American Law 58(2): 2001
- "Footnote to History: a Personal Account of Wounded Knee 1973 told for Lauren and Alex," University of Illinois Law Review, 1995
- "Footnote to History"

Legal offices
Preceded by Omer Poos	Judge of the United States District Court for the Southern District of Illinois; 1973–1976	Succeeded by J. Waldo Ackerman
Preceded by John Paul Stevens	Judge of the United States Court of Appeals for the Seventh Circuit; 1976–1992	Succeeded by Ilana Rovner
