= Alexander J. Seiler =

Swiss documentary filmmaker (1928–2018)

- Born: 6 August 1928; Zurich, Switzerland
- Died: 22 November 2018 (aged 90)
- Occupations: Documentary filmmaker; film producer; journalist
- Spouse: June Kovach (m. 1955)
- Father: Franz Seiler
- Awards: Palme d'Or, Cannes (1963); Zurich Film Prize (1990)

Alexander J. Seiler (6 August 1928 – 22 November 2018) was a Swiss documentary filmmaker. From 1961 he produced feature films and, above all, documentaries with his wife June Kovach and Rob Gnant. With Siamo italiani (1964) he created a groundbreaking example of the sociopolitical and aesthetic documentary film, and he is counted among the most important Swiss documentary filmmakers. In 1963 he won the Palme d'Or at the Cannes Film Festival.

== Biography ==
Alexander J. Seiler was born on 6 August 1928 in Zurich, the son of Franz Seiler. In 1955 he married June Kovach, a pianist, film editor and filmmaker. From 1947 to 1951 and from 1955 to 1957 he studied German literature, musicology, art history, philosophy and theatre studies in Basel, Zurich, Paris, Munich and Vienna, and obtained a doctorate (Dr. phil.). From 1951 to 1955 and from 1958 to 1961 he worked as a journalist in Zurich and Basel.

From 1961 Seiler produced feature films and, above all, documentaries with Kovach and Rob Gnant, from 1963 to 1971 as Seiler & Gnant Filmproduktion, from 1972 to 1982 as Nemo Film and from 1982 to 2002 as Zyklop Film. From 1965 to 1970 he was secretary of the Verband Schweizerischer Filmgestalter (association of Swiss filmmakers) and he remained on its board until 1984. He co-founded the Swiss Film Center (Schweizerisches Filmzentrum), in which he was involved from 1968 to 1984, and was a member of the Federal Film Commission (Eidgenössische Filmkommission) from 1969 to 1971. From 1987 to 1991 he was co-editor of the magazine Einspruch.

Seiler, who created a groundbreaking example of the sociopolitical and aesthetic documentary film with Siamo italiani (1964), is counted among the most important Swiss documentary filmmakers. He won the Palme d'Or at the Cannes Film Festival in 1963 and the Zurich Film Prize (Zürcher Filmpreis) in 1990. He died on 22 November 2018.

== Works ==
- Daneben geschrieben, 2008 (with a filmography)

== Bibliography ==
- Filmbulletin, 1993, no. 4 (special issue)
- H. Dumont and M. Tortajada (eds.), Histoire du cinéma suisse 1966–2000, 2 vols., 2007

=== Archives ===
- Swiss Literary Archives, Bern: personal papers (Nachlass)
