= Walter C. Lindley =

American judge (1880–1958)

Judge of the United States Court of Appeals for the Seventh Circuit
- In office October 13, 1949 – January 3, 1958
- Appointed by: Harry S. Truman
- Preceded by: Sherman Minton
- Succeeded by: Winfred George Knoch

Judge of the United States District Court for the Eastern District of Illinois
- In office September 22, 1922 – October 23, 1949
- Appointed by: Warren G. Harding
- Preceded by: Seat established by 42 Stat. 837
- Succeeded by: Casper Platt

Personal details
- Born: Walter C. Lindley; July 12, 1880 Neoga, Illinois, U.S.
- Died: January 3, 1958 (aged 77)
- Education: University of Illinois at Urbana–Champaign (AB); University of Illinois College of Law (LLB, JD)

Walter C. Lindley (July 12, 1880 – January 3, 1958) was a United States circuit judge of the United States Court of Appeals for the Seventh Circuit and previously was a United States district judge of the United States District Court for the Eastern District of Illinois.

== Education and career ==
Born in Neoga, Illinois, Lindley received an Artium Baccalaureus degree from the University of Illinois at Urbana–Champaign, a Bachelor of Laws in 1904 from the University of Illinois College of Law and a Juris Doctor in 1910 from the same institution. He was in private practice in Danville, Illinois from 1904 to 1922. He was a master in chancery for the United States District Court for the Eastern District of Illinois from 1912 to 1918. He was a member of the Vermillion County, Illinois Board of Supervisors from 1916 to 1920.

== Federal judicial service ==
Lindley was nominated by President Warren G. Harding on September 20, 1922, to the United States District Court for the Eastern District of Illinois, to a new seat authorized by 42 Stat. 837. He was confirmed by the United States Senate on September 22, 1922, and received his commission the same day. His service terminated on October 23, 1949, due to his elevation to the Seventh Circuit.

Lindley served as a Judge of the Emergency Court of Appeals from 1944 to 1958. In 1932 when Oliver Wendell Holmes Jr. retired from the Supreme Court, Lindley was on President Herbert Hoover’s list of possible replacements, although the seat ultimately went to Benjamin N. Cardozo.

Lindley was nominated by President Harry S. Truman on September 15, 1949, to a seat on the United States Court of Appeals for the Seventh Circuit vacated by Judge Sherman Minton. He was confirmed by the Senate on October 12, 1949, and received his commission on October 13, 1949. His service terminated on January 3, 1958, due to his death.

== See also ==
- List of United States federal judges by longevity of service

== Sources ==
Legal offices
Preceded by Seat established by 42 Stat. 837	Judge of the United States District Court for the Eastern District of Illinois; 1922–1949	Succeeded by Casper Platt
Preceded by Sherman Minton	Judge of the United States Court of Appeals for the Seventh Circuit; 1949–1958	Succeeded by Winfred George Knoch
