= J. Waldo Ackerman =

American judge (1926–1984)

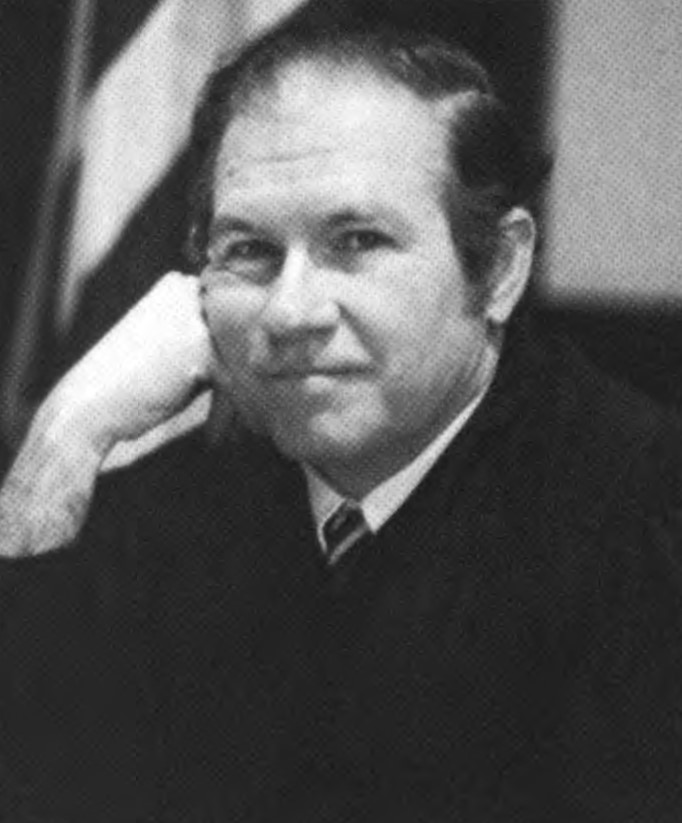

Chief Judge of the United States District Court for the Central District of Illinois
- In office 1982–1984
- Preceded by: Robert Dale Morgan
- Succeeded by: Harold Baker

Judge of the United States District Court for the Central District of Illinois
- In office March 31, 1979 – November 23, 1984
- Appointed by: operation of law
- Preceded by: Seat established by 93 Stat. 6
- Succeeded by: Richard Henry Mills

Judge of the United States District Court for the Southern District of Illinois
- In office July 2, 1976 – March 31, 1979
- Appointed by: Gerald Ford
- Preceded by: Harlington Wood Jr.
- Succeeded by: Seat abolished

Personal details
- Born: James Waldo Ackerman; January 1, 1926 Jacksonville, Florida, U.S.
- Died: November 23, 1984 (aged 58) Springfield, Illinois, U.S.
- Education: Marquette University (BS); Marquette University Law School (JD)

James Waldo Ackerman (January 1, 1926 – November 23, 1984) was a United States district judge of the United States District Court for the Southern District of Illinois and the United States District Court for the Central District of Illinois.

== Education and career ==
Born in Jacksonville, Florida, Ackerman received a Bachelor of Science degree from Marquette University in 1947 and a Juris Doctor from Marquette University Law School in 1949. He served in the United States Navy, from 1944 to 1946 and again from 1952 to 1954. In the interim, he was in private practice of law in Sangamon County, Illinois. He was an assistant state's attorney for Sangamon County from 1954 to 1956, and then state's attorney in that county until 1960, when he returned to private practice. While in private practice, he was counsel to the municipal corporation of Springfield, Illinois from 1961 to 1962, assistant state treasurer for Illinois from 1963 to 1964, and deputy state attorney general from 1968 to 1971. He was a judge of the Illinois Circuit Court from 1971 to 1976.

== Federal judicial service ==
Ackerman was nominated by President Gerald Ford on June 18, 1976, to a seat on the United States District Court for the Southern District of Illinois vacated by Judge Harlington Wood Jr. He was confirmed by the United States Senate on July 2, 1976, and received his commission on July 2, 1976. His service terminated on March 31, 1979, due to reassignment by operation of law to a new seat on the United States District Court for the Central District of Illinois created by 93 Stat. 6. He served as Chief Judge of the Central District from 1982 to 1984. His service terminated on November 23, 1984, due to his death in Springfield.

== Sources ==
Legal offices
Preceded by Harlington Wood Jr.	Judge of the United States District Court for the Southern District of Illinois; 1976–1979	Succeeded by Seat abolished
Preceded by Seat established by 93 Stat. 6	Judge of the United States District Court for the Central District of Illinois; 1979–1984	Succeeded by Richard Henry Mills
Preceded by Robert Dale Morgan	Chief Judge of the United States District Court for the Central District of Illinois; 1982–1984	Succeeded by Harold Baker
