= HotellerieSuisse =

Employers' organization of Swiss hoteliers

- Company type: Club
- Industry: Employers' organization for Hotels
- Founded: 1882; 143 years ago (as Schweizer Hotelier-Verein, SHV)
- Headquarters: Bern, Switzerland 46.93550°N 7.436375°E
- Key people: Christian Hürlimann (Director); Martin von Moos (President)
- Number of employees: 70
- Website: hotelleriesuisse.ch

Hotelleriesuisse (common spelling HotellerieSuisse, actually Schweizer Hotelier-Verein, SHV; also Swiss Hotel Association) is the Employers' organization of the Swiss accommodation industry and represents the interests of accommodation establishments in Switzerland.

== History and organisation ==
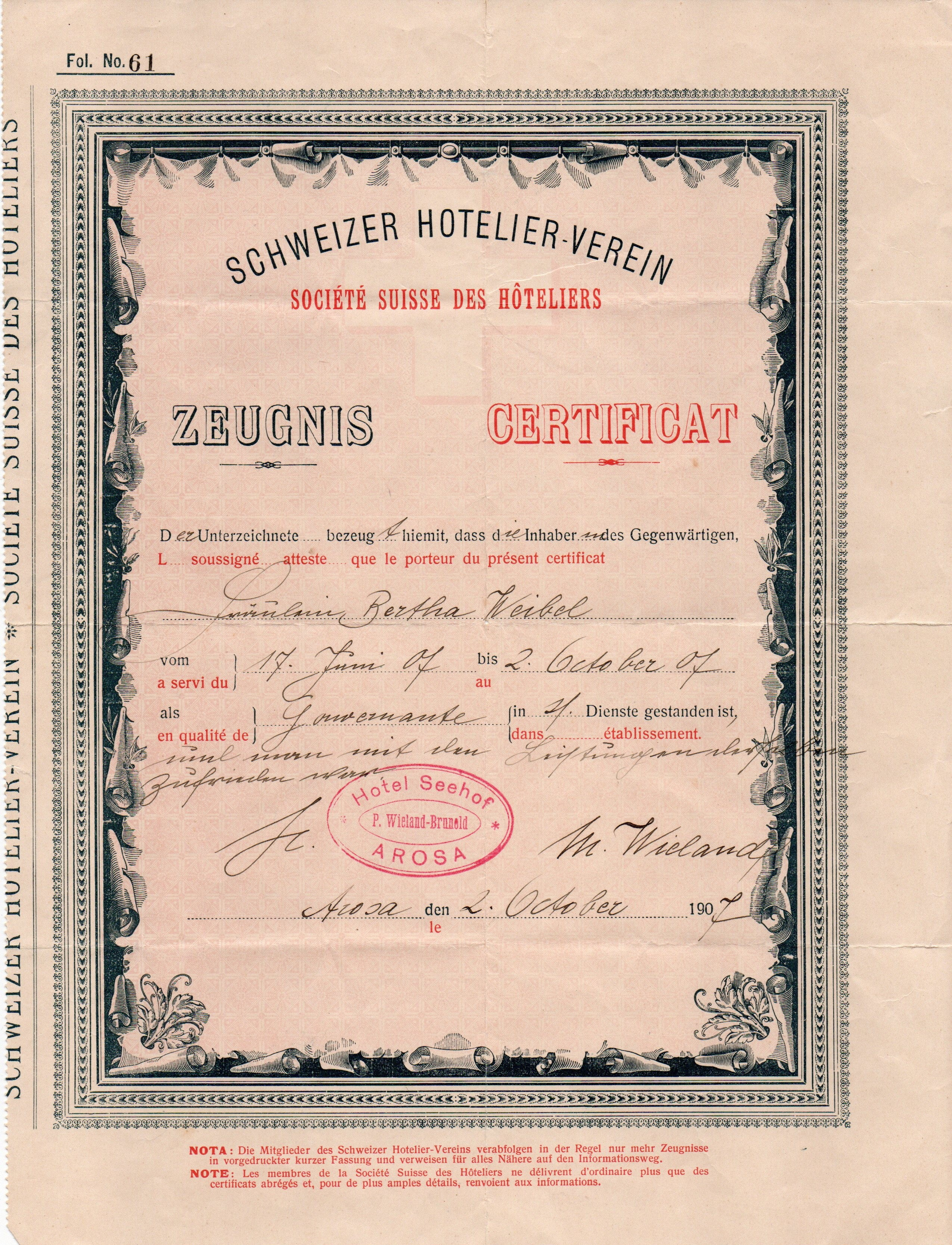
Job reference of the Swiss Hotel Association

The association was founded on 11 February 1882 as the Schweizer Hotelier-Verein (SVH).

The member companies of HotellerieSuisse account for two-thirds of Switzerland's accommodation establishments and generate around three-quarters of the corresponding overnight stays. As the umbrella organization of 13 regional associations, HotellerieSuisse is present in all parts of the country and language regions and employs around 70 people in Bern.

== Agendas ==
HotellerieSuisse supports its member companies in their business management, in ensuring the availability of qualified specialists for the industry, and in advocating for industry- and employer-friendly framework conditions at a political level.

Tourism is also one of Switzerland's five most important export industries. As a representative of a sub-sector of tourism, HotellerieSuisse is a member of various umbrella organisations and maintains strategic partnerships in the tourism sector.

=== Areas of activity ===
- Representation of economic policy interests for tourism in Switzerland
- Swiss hotel rating
- Management of the comprehensive Swiss hotel database
- Promotion of young talent, training and further education
- Advice and information service
- Maintaining the social partnership via the national collective labour agreement (L-GAV) for the hospitality industry
- Publication of the independent Swiss trade journal for tourism htr hotel revue and other specialised publications
- Offer of a social insurance solution together with HOTELA

HotellerieSuisse is also a shareholder of the Switzerland Travel Centre AG.

=== Hotel rating ===
In 1978, the association introduced the hotel rating system in Switzerland. A new rating system for awarding hotel stars has been in force in Switzerland since 1 January 2011. The Swiss hotel rating system is based on a catalogue of standards drawn up by HotellerieSuisse together with European partner associations. The harmonised hotel rating system is run by the Hotelstars Union, which was founded in 2009. It is held under the auspices of HOTREC, the European umbrella organisation for hotels, restaurants and cafés in Europe. HotellerieSuisse is a founding member of HOTREC.

=== Educational services ===
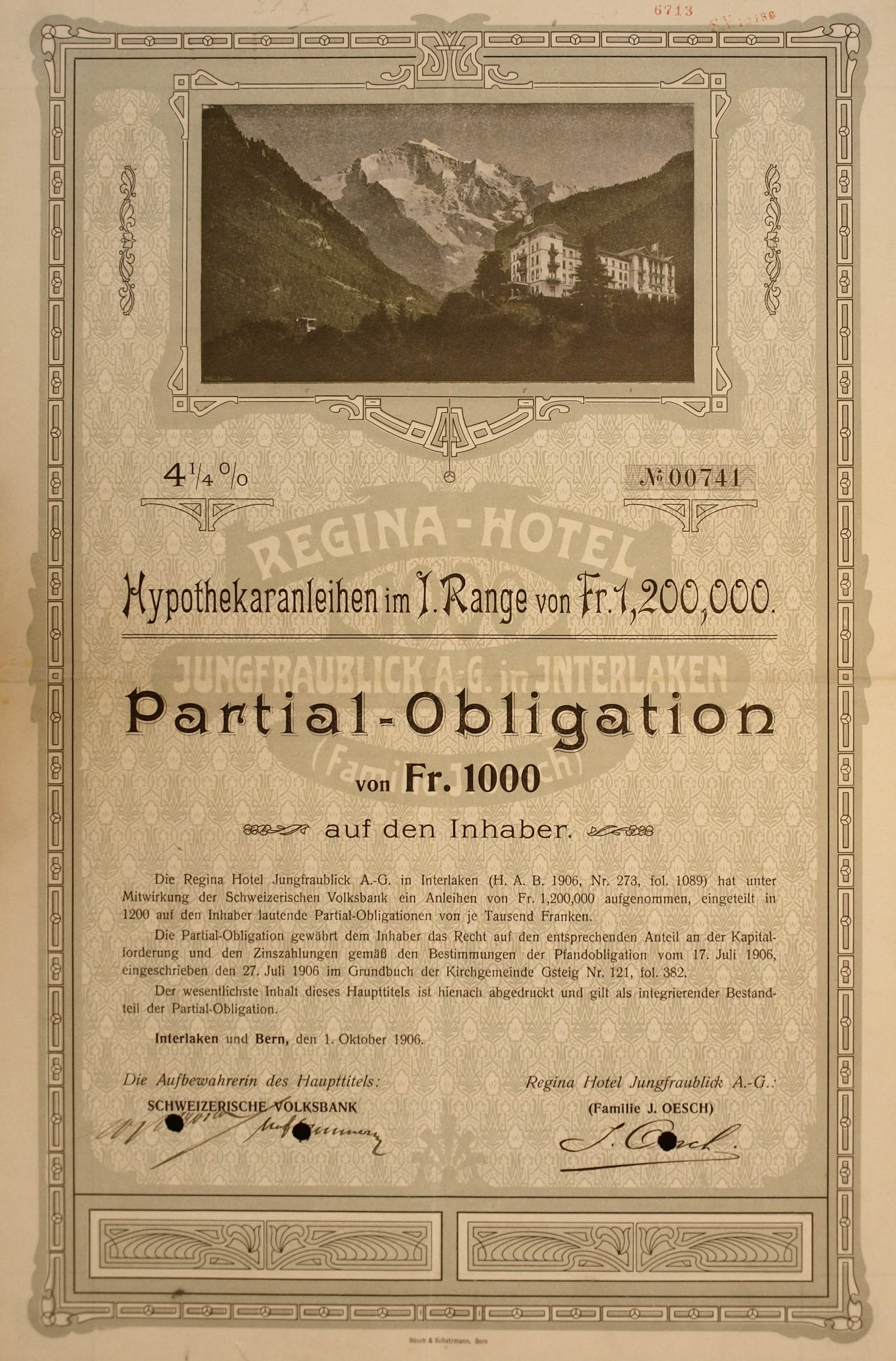
Partial bond of the Regina-Hotel Jungfraublick AG dated 1 October 1906 with illustration of today's Regina school hotel from HotellerieSuisse

Education is a central concern of the association. HotellerieSuisse is the founder of the Thun Hotel Management School and a minority shareholder of the Swiss School of Tourism and Hospitality as well as the founder of the École hôtelière de Lausanne. HotellerieSuisse is also one of the supporting organisations of Hotel & Gastro formation, which, as an OdA, is, among other things, an examination organiser and provider of various training courses leading to a federal diploma or a federal professional certificate. The sector records around 3,500 completed apprenticeships and around 800 higher professional education qualifications every year.
