= Charles Guy Briggle =

American judge

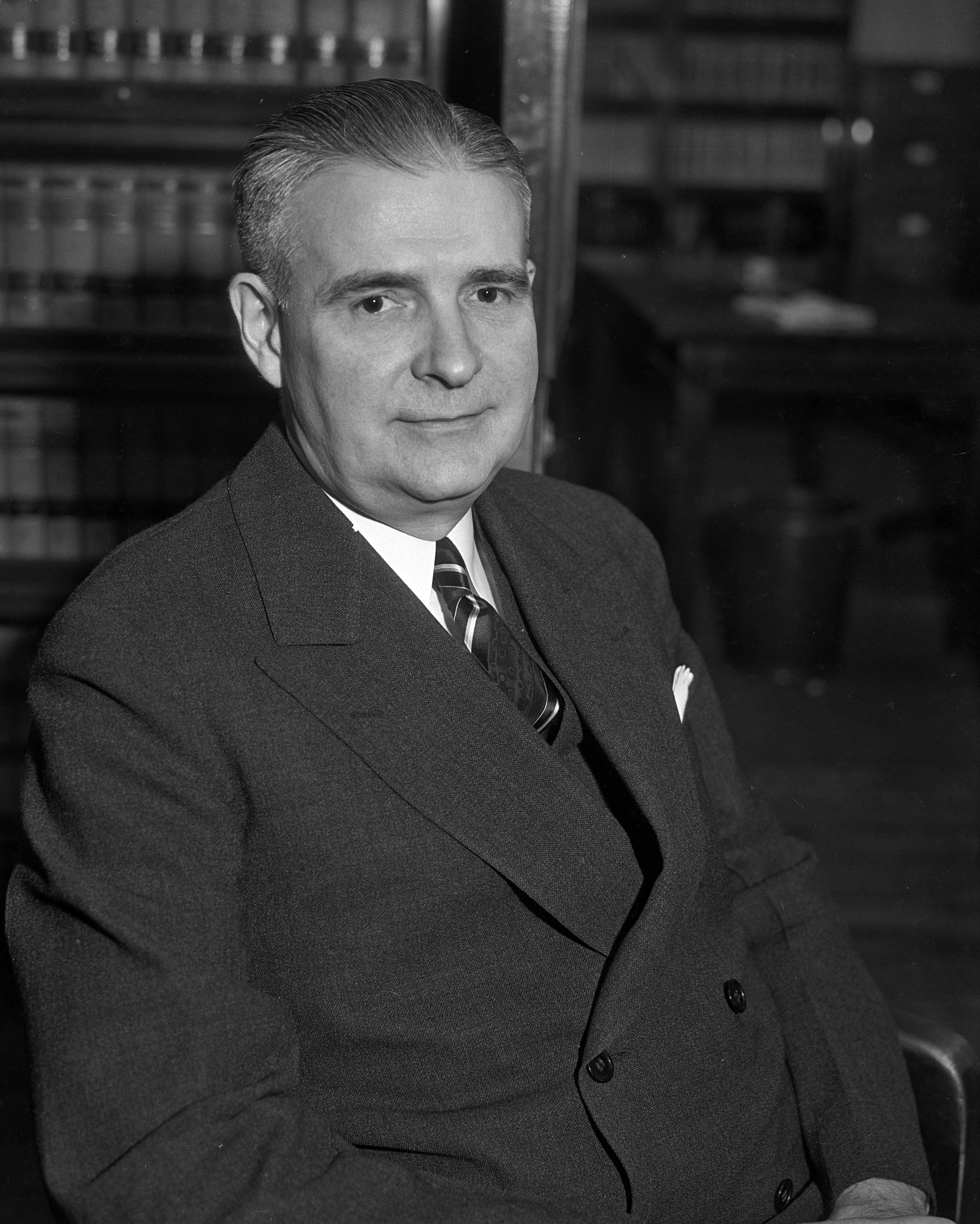
- Briggle in 1935

Senior Judge of the United States District Court for the Southern District of Illinois
- In office August 1, 1958 – June 6, 1972

Chief Judge of the United States District Court for the Southern District of Illinois
- In office 1948–1958
- Preceded by: Office established
- Succeeded by: Frederick Olen Mercer

Judge of the United States District Court for the Southern District of Illinois
- In office January 25, 1932 – August 1, 1958
- Appointed by: Herbert Hoover
- Preceded by: Seat established by 46 Stat. 1196
- Succeeded by: Omer Poos

Personal details
- Born: Charles Guy Briggle; January 27, 1883 Rushville, Illinois
- Died: June 6, 1972 (aged 89)
- Education: University of Illinois College of Law (LL.B.)

Charles Guy Briggle (January 27, 1883 – June 6, 1972) was a United States district judge of the United States District Court for the Southern District of Illinois.

== Education and career ==
Born in Rushville, Illinois, Briggle received a Bachelor of Laws from the University of Illinois College of Law in 1904. He was in private practice in Morris, Illinois from 1905 to 1907, and in Springfield, Illinois from 1907 to 1927, also serving as a Master in Chancery for the Illinois Circuit Court in Sangamon County from 1917 to 1927. He then served as a Judge of the Illinois Circuit Court in Sangamon County until 1932.

== Federal judicial service ==
On January 8, 1932, Briggle was nominated by President Herbert Hoover to a new seat on the United States District Court for the Southern District of Illinois created by 46 Stat. 1196. He was confirmed by the United States Senate on January 20, 1932, and received his commission on January 25, 1932. He served as Chief Judge from 1948 to 1958, assuming senior status on August 1, 1958. He served in that capacity until his death on June 6, 1972.

== Sources ==
Legal offices
Preceded by Seat established by 46 Stat. 1196	Judge of the United States District Court for the Southern District of Illinois; 1932–1958	Succeeded by Omer Poos
Preceded by Office established	Chief Judge of the United States District Court for the Southern District of Illinois; 1948–1958	Succeeded by Frederick Olen Mercer
