= Henry Seiler Wise =

American judge

Senior Judge of the United States District Court for the Central District of Illinois
- In office March 31, 1979 – March 16, 1982

Senior Judge of the United States District Court for the Eastern District of Illinois
- In office March 31, 1978 – March 31, 1979

Chief Judge of the United States District Court for the Eastern District of Illinois
- In office 1972–1978
- Preceded by: William George Juergens
- Succeeded by: James L. Foreman

Judge of the United States District Court for the Eastern District of Illinois
- In office September 21, 1966 – March 31, 1978
- Appointed by: Lyndon B. Johnson
- Preceded by: Casper Platt
- Succeeded by: Harold Baker

Personal details
- Born: Henry Seiler Wise; July 16, 1909 Mt. Carmel, Illinois, U.S.
- Died: March 16, 1982 (aged 72) Danville, Illinois, U.S.
- Education: Washington University in St. Louis (A.B.); Washington University School of Law (LL.B.)

Henry Seiler Wise (July 16, 1909 – March 16, 1982) was a United States district judge of the United States District Court for the Eastern District of Illinois and the United States District Court for the Central District of Illinois.

== Education and career ==
Born in Mt. Carmel, Illinois, Wise received an Artium Baccalaureus degree from Washington University in St. Louis in 1933 and a Bachelor of Laws from Washington University School of Law in 1933. He was in private practice in Danville, Illinois from 1934 to 1966. He was a Commissioner of the Illinois Court of Claims from 1949 to 1953. He was a member of the Illinois Parole and Pardon Board from 1961 to 1966.

== Federal judicial service ==
Wise was nominated by President Lyndon B. Johnson on August 17, 1966, to a seat on the United States District Court for the Eastern District of Illinois vacated by Judge Casper Platt. He was confirmed by the United States Senate on September 20, 1966, and received his commission on September 21, 1966. He served as Chief Judge from 1972 to 1978, assuming senior status on March 31, 1978. Wise was reassigned by operation of law to the United States District Court for the Central District of Illinois on March 31, 1979, by 92 Stat. 883. His service terminated on March 16, 1982, due to his death in Danville.

== Sources ==
Legal offices
Preceded by Casper Platt	Judge of the United States District Court for the Eastern District of Illinois; 1966–1978	Succeeded by Harold Baker
Preceded by William George Juergens	Chief Judge of the United States District Court for the Eastern District of Illinois; 1972–1978	Succeeded by James L. Foreman
