= Bernhard Seiler =

Swiss politician (1930–2025)

Member of the Council of States
- In office 1987–1999

President of the Grand Council of Schaffhausen
- In office 1983–1983

Member of the Grand Council of Schaffhausen
- In office 1969–1987

Personal details
- Born: 8 March 1930 Bibern, Schaffhausen, Switzerland
- Died: 22 February 2025 (aged 94)
- Party: Swiss People's Party (formerly PAB)
- Spouse: Irmgard Murbach (m. 1957)
- Education: ETH Zurich; University of Dublin
- Profession: Agronomist

Bernhard Seiler (8 March 1930 – 22 February 2025) was a Swiss agronomist and politician. He served as a member of the Council of States from 1987 to 1999 and was president of the Grand Council of Schaffhausen in 1983.

== Early life and education ==
Seiler was born on 8 March 1930 in Bibern, Canton of Schaffhausen. He was the son of Emil Seiler, a farmer and cantonal judge, and held citizenship of Bibern, Hofen, and Schaffhausen. He completed his secondary education at the gymnasium in Schaffhausen before studying at the Swiss Federal Institute of Technology (ETH) in Zurich from 1951 to 1955, where he earned a diploma in agricultural engineering. He pursued additional training at the University of Dublin from 1955 to 1956.

== Career ==
After completing his studies, Seiler operated a dairy farm near Montreal from 1956 to 1960. Upon returning to Switzerland, he served as an agronomy instructor in Sissach from 1961 to 1962, then became a teacher of crop production at the agricultural school of Charlottenfels in Neuhausen am Rheinfall from 1962 to 1993. He directed the school from 1975 to 1987. In the military, he attained the rank of colonel.

== Political career ==
A member of the Farmers, Traders and Citizens' Party (PAB), later the Swiss People's Party (SVP/UDC), Seiler began his political career on the municipal council of Thayngen, where he served from 1969 to 1984 and presided three times. He was a member of the Grand Council of Schaffhausen from 1969 to 1987, serving as its president in 1983.

From 1987 to 1999, Seiler represented the Canton of Schaffhausen in the Council of States, where he served on the management commission. During this period, he was also a member of the Parliamentary Assembly of the Council of Europe, where he chaired the Committee on Agriculture and Rural Development before becoming an honorary member. He led the Schaffhausen section of the SVP from 1999 to 2001 and directed the societies and corporations of Schaffhausen from 1992.

== Personal life ==
In 1957, Seiler married Irmgard Murbach, daughter of Emil Murbach, a merchant. He died on 22 February 2025.
