= United States District Court for the Eastern District of Illinois =

Defunct federal district court

- (E.D. Ill.)
- Defunct
- Map indicating the changing Districts of Illinois
- Location: Melvin Price Federal Building and U.S. Courthouse (East St. Louis) More locations: Danville; Cairo; Benton
- Appeals to: Seventh Circuit
- Established: March 3, 1905
- Abolished: March 31, 1979

The United States District Court for the Eastern District of Illinois (in case citations, E.D. Ill.) is a former federal district court for the state of Illinois. The court was established on March 3, 1905, by 33 Stat. 992. The Northern and Southern Districts had been established on February 13, 1855. The statute establishing the Eastern District specified the counties to be included in that District as follows:

Kankakee, Iroquois, Ford, Vermilion, Champaign, Piatt, Moultrie, Douglas, Edgar, Shelby, Coles, Clark, Cumberland, Effingham, Fayette, Marion, Clay, Jasper, Crawford, Lawrence, Richland, Clinton, Saint Clair, Washington, Jefferson, Wayne, Edwards, Wabash, White, Hamilton, Franklin, Perry, Randolph, Monroe, Gallatin, Saline, Williamson, Jackson, Hardin, Pope, Johnson, Union, Alexander, Pulaski, and Massac.

On October 2, 1978, Illinois was reorganized into the Northern, Central, and Southern Districts, with thirteen judgeships authorized for the Northern District, two for the Central District, and two for the Southern District.

== Former judges ==
#	Judge	Born–died	Active service	Chief Judge	Senior status	Appointed by	Reason for termination
1	Francis Marion Wright	1844–1917	1905–1917	—	—	T. Roosevelt	death
2	George W. English	1866–1941	1918–1926	—	—	Wilson	resignation
3	Walter C. Lindley	1880–1958	1922–1949	—	—	Harding	elevation
4	Fred Louis Wham	1884–1967	1927–1956	1949–1956	1956–1967	Coolidge	death
5	Casper Platt	1892–1965	1949–1965	1956–1965	—	Truman	death
6	William George Juergens	1904–1988	1956–1972	1965–1972	1972–1979	Eisenhower	reassignment
7	Henry Seiler Wise	1909–1982	1966–1978	1972–1978	1978–1979	L. Johnson	reassignment
8	James L. Foreman	1927–2012	1972–1979	1978–1979	—	Nixon	reassignment
9	Harold Baker	1929–2023	1978–1979	—	—	Carter	reassignment

== Chief judges ==
Chief Judge
Wham	1949–1956
Platt	1956–1965
Juergens	1965–1972
Wise	1972–1978
Foreman	1978–1979
Abolished on March 31, 1979 by 92 Stat. 883

Chief judges have administrative responsibilities with respect to their district court. Unlike the Supreme Court, where one justice is specifically nominated to be chief, the office of chief judge rotates among the district court judges. To be chief, a judge must have been in active service on the court for at least one year, be under the age of 65, and have not previously served as chief judge.

A vacancy is filled by the judge highest in seniority among the group of qualified judges. The chief judge serves for a term of seven years, or until age 70, whichever occurs first. The age restrictions are waived if no members of the court would otherwise be qualified for the position.

When the office was created in 1948, the chief judge was the longest-serving judge who had not elected to retire, on what has since 1958 been known as senior status, or declined to serve as chief judge. After August 6, 1959, judges could not become or remain chief after turning 70 years old. The current rules have been in operation since October 1, 1982.

== Succession of seats ==
Seat 1
Seat established on March 3, 1905 by 33 Stat. 992
Wright	1905–1917
English	1918–1926
Wham	1927–1956
Juergens	1956–1972
Foreman	1972–1979
Seat reassigned to Southern District on March 31, 1979 by 93 Stat. 6

Seat 2
Seat established on September 14, 1922 by 42 Stat. 837
Lindley	1922–1949
Platt	1949–1965
Wise	1966–1978
Baker	1978–1979
Seat reassigned to Central District on March 31, 1979 by 93 Stat. 6

== See also ==
- Courts of Illinois
- List of United States federal courthouses in Illinois
