= Michael J. Seiler =

American behavioral real estate scholar

Michael Joseph Seiler
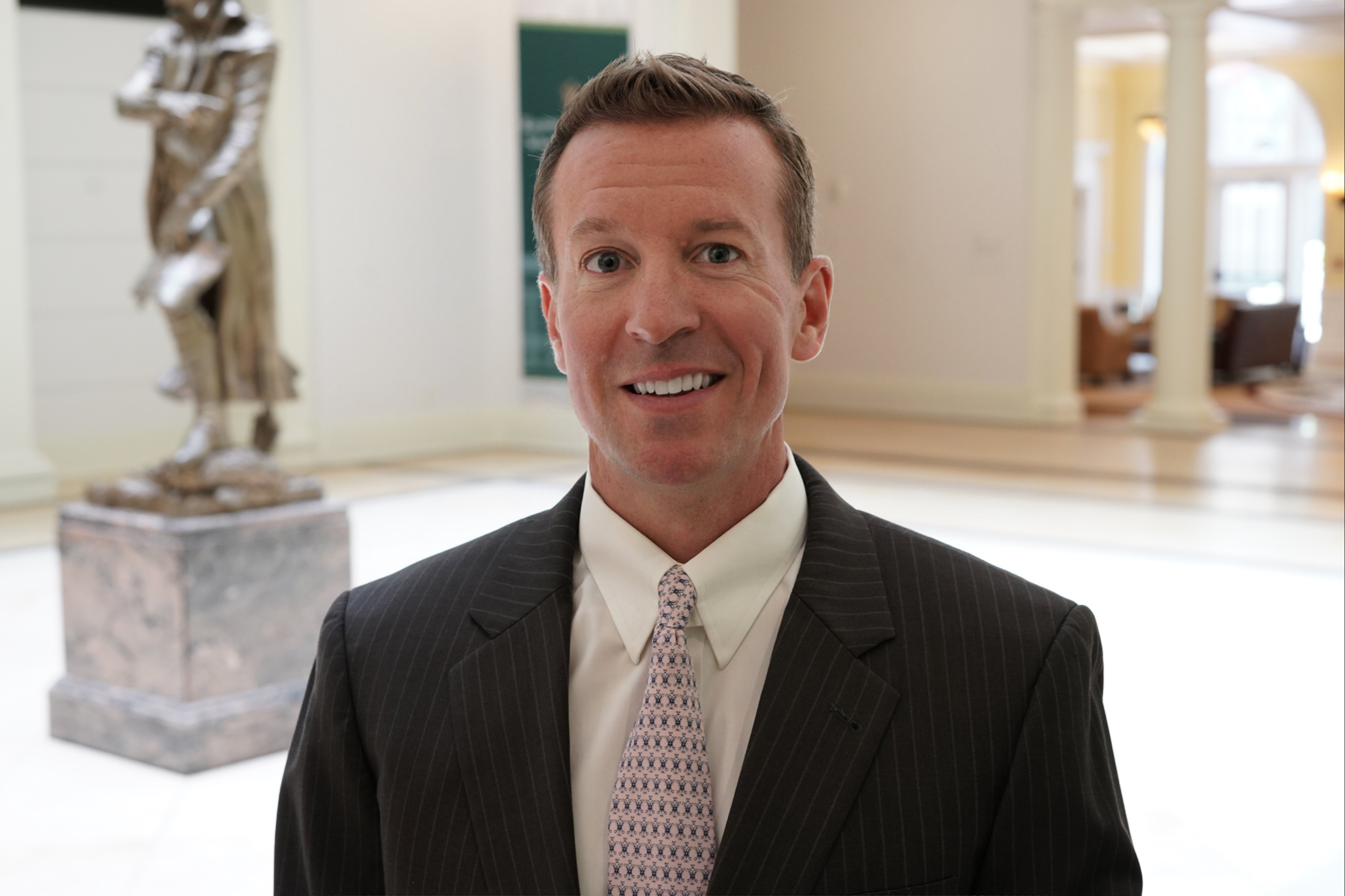
- Michael Seiler at College of William and Mary
- Born: Hahn, Germany
- Citizenship: United States
- Employer: College of William and Mary
- Office: J. Edward Zollinger Endowed Chair Professor of Finance and Real Estate

Michael Joseph Seiler is an American behavioral real estate scholar who works at the College of William & Mary in Williamsburg, Virginia, where he is the J. Edward Zollinger Endowed Chair Professor of Finance and Real Estate. He is best known for his works in designing and conducting behavioral experiments in consumer decision-making.

== Early life ==
Michael J. Seiler's mother, Jayne H. Seiler, was a professional artist and his father, Paul J. Seiler, was a Purple Heart Award recipient and fighter pilot in the United States Air Force and later became a commercial airline pilot with American Airlines. Michael was born in Hahn, Germany, where his father was stationed at the time. When orders came down to move back to the states, the family moved to Sebring, Florida, where he grew up.

== Career ==
Seiler started his career as an assistant professor at Hawaii Pacific University in Honolulu, Hawaii in 1997. Seiler was most recently a visiting scholar at the Federal Housing Finance Agency (FHFA) in Washington DC and before that a visiting scholar at Harvard University, University of Cambridge, London School of Economics, and a visiting professor at the Massachusetts Institute of Technology (MIT), Johns Hopkins University and the Australian National University.

Since its inception in 2015, Michael Seiler has been ranked #1 on the Real Estate Academic Leadership (REAL) rankings, which reflects the number of publications in the top three real estate journals (Real Estate Economics, Journal of Real Estate Research, and Journal of Real Estate Finance and Economics) over the last five rolling year period (American Real Estate Society). Seiler has been an expert witness for a number of real estate disputes and has been hired by legal firms and even the Consumer Financial Protection Bureau (CFPB).

Michael further delivers keynote speaking addresses at national and international conferences on a wide array of topics that generally reflect the original results from his research. He is often quoted in national newspapers like the Wall Street Journal, Washington Post, LA Times and NY Times.

In 2009, Seiler was named the William N. Kinnard Young Scholar Award winner. In 2015, Michael was named among the most Innovative Thinkers in Housing Market Research. In 2018, he was given the James A. Graaskamp Award. In 2022, Michael received the Richard Ratcliff Award. In 2024, he was awarded the David Ricardo Medal by the American Real Estate Society for his published research in academic and refereed professional journals.

== Selected research ==
- Seiler, Michael J.; Siebert, Ralph B.; Yang, Liuming (2023-05-15). "Airbnb or not Airbnb? That is the question: How Airbnb bans disrupt rental markets". Real Estate Economics. 52 (1): 239–270. doi:10.1111/1540-6229.12440. ISSN 1080-8620.
- Seiler, Michael J.; Yang, Liuming (2023-08-18). "Gun-ownership disclosure and localized home prices". Real Estate Economics. 51 (6): 1399–1436. doi:10.1111/1540-6229.12454. ISSN 1080-8620.
- Seiler, Michael J.; Yang, Liuming (2023). "The burgeoning role of iBuyers in the housing market". Real Estate Economics. 51 (3): 721–753. doi:10.1111/1540-6229.12384.
- Gneezy, Uri; Hoffman, Moshe; Lane, Mark A; List, John A; Livingston, Jeffrey A; Seiler, Michael J (2022-04-28). "Can wishful thinking explain evidence for overconfidence? An experiment on belief updating". Oxford Economic Papers. 75 (1): 35–54. doi:10.1093/oep/gpac015. ISSN 0030-7653.
- Harrison, David M.; Luchtenberg, Kimberly F.; Seiler, Michael J. (2021-11-16). "Improving Mortgage Default Collection Efforts by Employing the Decoy Effect". The Journal of Real Estate Finance and Economics. 66 (4): 840–860. doi:10.1007/s11146-021-09876-8. ISSN 0895-5638.
- Anderson, Jackson T.; Harrison, David M.; Seiler, Michael J. (2021-05-14). "Reducing Strategic Forbearance under the CARES Act: an Experimental Approach Utilizing Recourse Attestation". The Journal of Real Estate Finance and Economics. 65 (2): 230–260. doi:10.1007/s11146-021-09842-4. ISSN 0895-5638. PMC 8120016. PMID 38624868.
- Anderson, Jackson T.; Freybote, Julia; Lucus, David; Seiler, Michael J.; Simon, Lauren (2021-12-22). "Using Artificial Intelligence to Identify Strategic Mortgage Default Attitudes". Journal of Real Estate Research. 44 (3): 429–445. doi:10.1080/08965803.2021.2009621. ISSN 0896-5803.
- Siebert, Ralph B.; Seiler, Michael J. (2021-04-26). "Why Do Buyers Pay Different Prices for Comparable Products? A Structural Approach on the Housing Market". The Journal of Real Estate Finance and Economics. 65 (2): 261–292. doi:10.1007/s11146-021-09841-5. hdl:10419/219155. ISSN 0895-5638.
- He, Xin; Lin, Zhenguo; Liu, Yingchun; Seiler, Michael J. (2017-10-29). "Search Benefit in Housing Markets: An Inverted U-Shaped Price and TOM Relation". Real Estate Economics. 48 (3): 772–807. doi:10.1111/1540-6229.12221. ISSN 1080-8620.
- Gibson, Scott; Seiler, Michael J.; Walden, Eric (2016-06-13). "Using Experimental and Neurological Data to Gain a Deeper Understanding of Realization Utility Theory". Real Estate Economics. 47 (4): 1119–1162. doi:10.1111/1540-6229.12164. ISSN 1080-8620.
- Seiler, Michael J. (2016-11-11). "Asymmetric Dominance and Its Impact on Mortgage Default Deficiency Collection Efforts". Real Estate Economics. 46 (4): 971–990. doi:10.1111/1540-6229.12176. ISSN 1080-8620.
- Seiler, Michael J. (2016-01-28). "Do Liquidated Damages Clauses Affect Strategic Mortgage Default Morality? A Test of the Disjunctive Thesis". Real Estate Economics. 45 (1): 204–230. doi:10.1111/1540-6229.12142. ISSN 1080-8620.
- Seiler, Michael J. (2017-07-01). "A Search for the Genetic Contributors to Strategic Mortgage Default: The Catechol-O-Methyltransferase (COMT) Gene". Journal of Real Estate Research. 39 (3): 349–372. doi:10.1080/10835547.2017.12091477. ISSN 0896-5803.
- Seiler, Michael J. (June 2016). "The perceived moral reprehensibility of strategic mortgage default". Journal of Housing Economics. 32: 18–28. doi:10.1016/j.jhe.2016.03.001. ISSN 1051-1377.
- Cardella, Eric; Seiler, Michael J. (2016). "The effect of listing price strategy on real estate negotiations: An experimental study". Journal of Economic Psychology. 52: 71–90. doi:10.1016/j.joep.2015.11.001. ISSN 0167-4870.
- Seiler, Michael J. (2015). "The role of informational uncertainty in the decision to strategically default". Journal of Housing Economics. 27: 49–59. doi:10.1016/j.jhe.2015.02.006. ISSN 1051-1377.
- Seiler, Michael J. (2015-04-01). "Do as I Say, Not as I Do: The Role of Advice versus Actions in the Decision to Strategically Default". Journal of Real Estate Research. 37 (2): 191–216. doi:10.1080/10835547.2015.12091412. ISSN 0896-5803.
- Collins, Andrew J.; Harrison, David M.; Seiler, Michael J. (2015-07-01). "Mortgage Modification and the Decision to Strategically Default: A Game Theoretic Approach". Journal of Real Estate Research. 37 (3): 439–470. doi:10.1080/10835547.2015.12091425. ISSN 0896-5803.
- Seiler, Michael J.; Walden, Eric (2014-07-31). "A Neurological Explanation of Strategic Mortgage Default". The Journal of Real Estate Finance and Economics. 51 (2): 215–230. doi:10.1007/s11146-014-9479-7. ISSN 0895-5638.
- Beracha, Eli; Seiler, Michael J. (2013-05-12). "The Effect of Listing Price Strategy on Transaction Selling Prices". The Journal of Real Estate Finance and Economics. 49 (2): 237–255. doi:10.1007/s11146-013-9424-1. ISSN 0895-5638.
- Seiler, Michael; Walden, Eric (2014-01-01). "Lender Characteristics and the Neurological Reasons for Strategic Mortgage Default". Journal of Real Estate Research. 36 (3): 341–362. doi:10.1080/10835547.2014.12091398. ISSN 0896-5803.
- Seiler, Michael J.; Lane, Mark A.; Harrison, David M. (2012-09-21). "Mimetic Herding Behavior and the Decision to Strategically Default". The Journal of Real Estate Finance and Economics. 49 (4): 621–653. doi:10.1007/s11146-012-9386-8. ISSN 0895-5638.
- Seiler, Michael J. (2012-09-20). "The Effect of Perceived Lender Characteristics and Market Conditions on Strategic Mortgage Defaults". The Journal of Real Estate Finance and Economics. 48 (2): 256–270. doi:10.1007/s11146-012-9388-6. ISSN 0895-5638.
- Seiler, Michael; Collins, Andrew; Fefferman, Nina (2013-01-01). "Strategic Mortgage Default in the Context of a Social Network: An Epidemiological Approach". Journal of Real Estate Research. 35 (4): 445–476. doi:10.1080/10835547.2013.12091371. ISSN 0896-5803.
- Seiler, Michael J. (July 2012). "Forward and Falsely Induced Reverse Information Cascades". Journal of Behavioral Finance. 13 (3): 226–240. doi:10.1080/15427560.2012.708688. ISSN 1542-7560.
