= Michael T. Seiler =

Former District Judge in Texas

Judge of the 435th District Court of Texas
- In office June 5, 2008 – February 15, 2016
- Nominated by: Rick Perry
- Succeeded by: Patty Maginnis

Personal details
- Born: Michael Thomas Seiler; June 18, 1967 (age 59)
- Party: Republican
- Education: University of Kansas; Creighton University School of Law

Resignation acceptance letter from Governor Abbott

Michael T. Seiler (born June 18, 1967) is a former District Judge in Texas who resigned from the bench on February 15, 2016 in order to avoid criminal prosecution for the solicitation of former juror support in his 2016 reelection bid.

== Bias in civil commitment program ==
Seiler was the judge appointed to oversee the civil commitment program in Texas and all repeat sex offenders were tried for civil commitment in his court. His bias on the issue was well documented and he was forced to recuse himself from several cases. Additionally, Seiler was reprimanded by the Texas state Commission on Judicial Conduct and stripped of his role as the sole judge to oversee the civil commitment program in Texas.

BallotPedia wrote that "On April 24, 2015, Seiler was publicly reprimanded by the Texas Commission on Judicial Conduct for his conduct and behavior towards attorneys representing sex offenders in his courtroom. Specifically, the commission found that Seiler "engaged in numerous instances in which he treated attorneys from the State Counsel for Offenders office, as well as one of their expert witnesses, in a manner that was less than patient, dignified and courteous.

== Resignation from the bench in lieu of criminal prosecution ==
Seiler was forced to resign from his seat on the bench in February 2016 to avoid prosecution for contacting former jurors of his court to support him in his contested reelection bid.
