= 1964 Illinois House of Representatives election =

- November 3, 1964

All 177 seats in the Illinois House of Representatives 89 seats needed for a majority
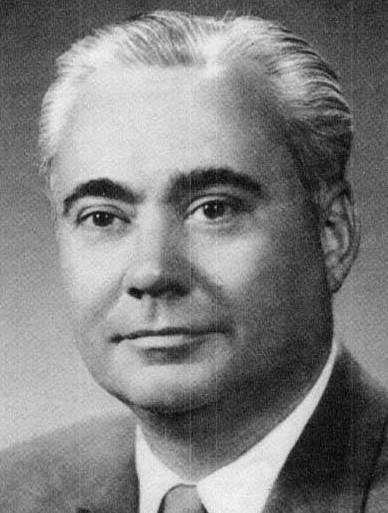

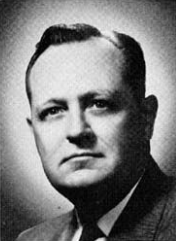
	Majority party	Minority party
Leader	John Touhy	John W. Lewis Jr.
Party	Democratic	Republican
Last election	87	90
Seats won	118	59
Seat change	▲31	▼31
Popular vote	273,638,326 (Note: Popular vote figures represent the total amounts of Democratic and Republican votes. Since every voter could vote for 177 candidates, this sums to a grand total much larger than the population of Illinois.)	252,085,214
Percentage	52.05%	47.95%
Composite vote by county
Democrats
50–60%
60–70%
Republicans
50–60%
60–70%
Speaker before election
John W. Lewis Jr.
Republican
Elected Speaker
John Touhy
Democratic

The U.S. state of Illinois held an election on November 3, 1964, for all 177 members of the state's House of Representatives for the 74th Illinois General Assembly, alongside other state and federal elections. Due to the state's failure to redistrict, all of the seats were elected at-large by plurality block voting, with voters choosing up to 177 candidates to support. Each party was only allowed to nominate 118 candidates. All 118 Democratic candidates won, flipping control of the chamber to Democrats with a two-thirds supermajority.

From 1901 to 1954, the state had failed to conduct legislative redistricting, at which point a constitutional amendment to force regular redistricting of the House was passed. Under its provisions, if the legislature and a backup redistricting commission failed to enact a map, an election would be held at-large. For the 1960 redistricting cycle, the state's governor was Democrat Otto Kerner Jr., while both chambers of the legislature were controlled by Republicans. The legislature passed a map along partisan lines which was vetoed by Kerner, and the commission faced similar partisan deadlock. Following a ruling by the Supreme Court of Illinois, an at-large election was held.

The ballot for the election was 33 inches (84 cm) long. Both parties nominated their candidates at party conventions, which were made up of delegates elected on the old legislative lines. Candidates did little campaigning outside of their home regions. Due to straight-ticket voting and the coattails of Lyndon B. Johnson in the concurrent presidential election, every Democrat was elected, receiving more votes than every Republican. The Republicans elected were mainly those endorsed by Chicago-area newspapers.

Reactions to the election were mixed. Politicians in both political parties received significant criticism for their failure to redistrict. Some pundits predicted significant voter confusion, and a high number of undervotes, but this did not happen. The legislature elected in 1964 pushed for governmental reform, starting the process that eventually led to the 1970 rewrite of the Constitution of Illinois. This election is the only time the lower house of a state legislature has been elected entirely at-large in the United States.

== Background ==
=== Constitutional procedure ===
Prior to the 1960s, Illinois had redistricted its House of Representatives only once since 1901. While the Constitution of Illinois stated that the legislature was required to redistrict the state after each United States census, it did not provide any method of enforcement if the legislature did not. Population shifts in the state had resulted in Chicago having a higher percentage of the state's population, and downstate legislators did not want their region to lose influence. Therefore, starting in the cycle after the 1910 United States census, legislators chose not to redistrict the state and the courts chose not to intervene to force redistricting. A constitutional convention, approved by voters in 1918, aimed to deal with the issue, but voters rejected its proposed constitution in 1922. The 1901 legislative map had 51 districts, with 19 located in Cook County, which contains Chicago and many of its suburbs. (Note: Districts were used for both the House of Representatives and the Senate. Each district elected one member to the Senate and three to the House of Representatives with a version of cumulative voting, where each voter had three votes, and had the option to vote multiple times for a single candidate. This system was intended to ensure a bipartisan delegation from each district.)

As the population of Chicago and Cook County grew, the level of malapportionment continued to increase. In the 1930 United States census, Cook County contained a majority of the state's population, but it continued to contain only 37.3% of the state's legislative districts. Throughout the 1920s and 1930s, residents of the Chicago area, most notably John B. Fergus and John W. Keogh, argued before both state and federal courts in unsuccessful attempts to force redistricting. In the 1930s, there were various efforts supported by governors Louis L. Emmerson and Henry Horner to allow Cook County proportional representation in either the Illinois House of Representatives or the Illinois Senate, while limiting its representation in the other, but these proposals died due to strong bipartisan opposition from downstate politicians.

By 1953, William Stratton, the newly elected governor of Illinois, viewed redistricting as a priority amidst increasing public pressure over malapportionment. Through a number of compromises, he managed to convince the legislature to pass a constitutional amendment to establish new redistricting procedures. The amendment allotted the 58 districts of the Illinois Senate into three areas: 18 to Chicago, 6 to Cook County, and 34 to downstate. The amendment, written to keep the Senate in downstate control, did not provide for periodic reapportionment of the Senate, intending to lock in the districts drawn in 1954 indefinitely, but it did provide that for the House's 59 districts, requiring redistricting after every decennial U.S. census. Initially, 23 districts would be assigned to Chicago, 7 to suburban Cook County, and 29 to downstate. To ensure regular reapportionment, the constitution contained two separate procedures in case the legislature failed to redistrict. First, redistricting would be done by a ten-member commission, with five members appointed from each political party by the governor. If that commission failed to create districts after four months, an at-large election would be held.

Opposition to the amendment was disorganized, while supporters included many state politicians and newspapers. The new redistricting process was approved by voters in a 1954 referendum with about 80% of the vote. Following the passage of the amendment, new districts were drawn in 1955. At this time, both chambers were Republican-controlled, as was the governorship, leading to a relatively non-controversial redistricting cycle. Each chamber created a map for their own chamber and passed the map that the other chamber created, with the maps being signed by Stratton. The map used for the House of Representatives was fairly apportioned, while the Senate's map still retained significant malapportionment. However, the maps were overall considered a significant improvement.

=== 1960 redistricting cycle ===
Following the 1962 elections, Republicans controlled both chambers of the legislature, albeit with a one-seat majority in the House. Governor Otto Kerner Jr., however, was a Democrat, resulting in a divided government. Redistricting for the House was required to take place in 1963, in preparation for the 1964 elections. In data from the 1960 census, the state's population had shifted towards suburbs of Chicago, particularly in Cook County, Lake County, and DuPage County. Using population-based apportionment, two districts would be shifted from Chicago to the suburbs, and two more from southern Illinois to northeastern Illinois. On April 23, 1963, Republicans in the legislature introduced a plan to that effect. Democrats responded on the same day with a plan to instead have districts that would include parts of both Chicago and its suburbs, allowing the city to have control of 23 districts, arguing that this was fair given Chicago's under-representation in the Senate.

Democrats received no Republican support for their redistricting plan, while Republicans failed to pass their plan over southern Illinois lawmakers in their caucus, who objected to the plan's proposed removal of two districts from their area. As a compromise, Republicans passed a plan that would only remove one district from southern Illinois, at the expense of a district planned for Lake County. However, this bill was vetoed by Kerner on July 1, as he deemed it "unfair". Kerner had previously promised to veto any partisan redistricting plan, and his veto message referred to the deliberate under-representation of Republican areas (which occurred as a result of the compromises made to appease downstate lawmakers). Kerner's veto was challenged at the Supreme Court of Illinois, where it was upheld. The failure of the legislature to redistrict caused the responsibility to fall to the backup commission.

=== Special commission deadlock ===
Each party's state central committee nominated ten candidates for the redistricting commission. Kerner appointed five from each party on August 14, 1963. The five Democrats appointed were George Dunne, finance chairman (and future president) of the Cook County Board of Commissioners; Ivan Elliott, former Illinois Attorney General; Alvin Fields, mayor of East St. Louis; Daniel Pierce, a member of the Democratic state central committee; and James Ronan, the chairman of the Democratic state central committee. The five Republicans appointed were Edward Jenison, a former U.S. representative; David Hunter, a former state legislator; Michael J. Connolly, the Republican leader in Chicago's 5th Ward; Eldon Martin, an attorney from Wilmette; and Fred G. Gurley, former president of the Atchison, Topeka and Santa Fe Railway. Dunne served as the Democratic spokesman on the commission, while Gurley served as the Republican spokesman. Kerner avoided appointing some of the more prominent politicians whom parties nominated for the commission: he did not appoint former governor Stratton, nominated by Republicans, and did not appoint Paul Powell, the Democratic minority leader in the House, or John Touhy, the Democratic minority whip.

The redistricting commission deadlocked over a similar issue to what prevented a bipartisan map from passing the legislature – namely, the number of districts in Chicago. Democrats on the commission argued for maintaining 23 districts in Chicago, and refused to accept a map with less than 22, while Republicans would only accept a map with 21 districts in the city, with two districts being moved to the Cook County suburbs. Starting on November 14, the Republicans on the commission began boycotting the meetings due to Democrats' insistence that Chicago control 23 districts. Republicans only resumed attending the meetings on December 12, two days before the final deadline to agree on a new map. Negotiations continued up until the deadline, with Democrats eventually proposing a map with only 22 Chicago-based districts, but the commission ultimately could not reach a compromise. The commission faced harsh criticism in editorials for its failure to agree on a map, with particularly strong criticism directed at the Democratic members for insisting on more Chicago-based districts than the city's population warranted.

=== Court rulings and special legislative session ===
Before the commission's ultimate failure to create maps, Republican state representative Gale Williams sued to overturn Kerner's veto of the legislative map, arguing that the governor had no authority to veto a redistricting bill. Kerner's actions were defended by the Illinois Attorney General, William G. Clark. This lawsuit was initially dismissed by Sangamon County Circuit Court judge Dewitt S. Crow on July 16. Williams appealed to the Illinois Supreme Court, which dismissed his case on November 13.

Two lawsuits were decided by the Supreme Court on January 4, 1964. First, a lawsuit filed by Republican state representative Fred Branson challenged the legality of the commission, arguing that since the legislature had not "failed to act" on redistricting, as they had passed a map, a commission could not be established. This lawsuit instead requested that the election be held using the previous redistricting cycle's map. The court rejected this argument, ruling that an at-large election had to take place. Secondly, a lawsuit filed by Chicago lawyer Gus Giannis argued that an at-large election also had to take place for the State Senate. In response to this case, Attorney General Clark issued a ruling stating that an at-large election would be required for the Senate as well. The Supreme Court rejected this argument, ruling that the constitution would only mandate an at-large election for the Senate if the chamber had not been redistricted in 1956, as the constitution did not otherwise require the Senate to be redistricted. (Note: People Ex Rel. Giannis v. Carpentier, 30 Ill. 2d 24 (Supreme Court of Illinois January 4, 1964).)

Following the court's decisions, Kerner called a special session of the legislature on January 6 to set up procedures for the at-large election. Kerner proposed procedures for the election, which the legislature was to consider. Notably, Illinois's practice of cumulative voting for the House of Representatives would be suspended, and instead minority party representation was to be guaranteed by only allowing each party to nominate 118 candidates for the 177 seats available.

An initial bill was passed unanimously by the House, but sunk by Republicans in the Senate over concerns that each party would choose to nominate fewer than 118 candidates, leading to an uncompetitive election unfairly favorable to incumbents. The Senate passed an amendment requiring that at least 118 candidates be nominated. However, the House refused to adopt this amendment. On January 28, nearing the deadline for the legislation, the Senate passed the House's bill, which suggested each party nominate 100 candidates while limiting each party to 118 candidates. The vote on the final bill was 161–0 in the House and 46–6 in the Senate. Kerner signed the bill on January 29.

== Election procedure and campaign ==
A sample ballot for the election from Lake County

Under the terms of the special session's emergency bill, each party could nominate up to 118 candidates at their party convention. Delegates to each party's convention were elected using the previous districts during the state's April primary. The House recommended that each party nominate 100 candidates, to protect incumbent House members and ensure the minority party would have at least 77 seats. Third-party and independent candidates could also run, though they needed to gather 25,000 signatures to make the ballot.

The election was held on November 3, 1964, as part of the 1964 Illinois elections.

=== Candidate selection ===
Both the Democratic and Republican conventions were held on June 1 in Springfield. The Republican convention, held at a local Elks Club building, was controlled by delegates loyal to Charles H. Percy, the party's candidate for governor. Delegates loyal to Percy refused to renominate nine incumbent legislators from the Chicago area, a part of the so-called "West Side bloc", who were viewed as loyal to the Democratic political machine in Cook County. (Note: Of these nine candidates, three, Gale Williams, J. Lisle Laufer, and Hector Brouillet, were not elected as convention delegates. The remaining six were W. J. Murphy, Robert Austin, Peter Granata, Louis Capuzi, Peter J. Miller, and Walter McAvoy.) In the end, 70 Republican incumbents were renominated. The Democratic convention, held at the St. Nicholas Hotel, delegated the responsibility for preparing a slate of candidates to an executive committee. The convention met again on June 20 to approve the candidates; all 68 incumbents who chose to run were renominated with little controversy. Both parties nominated slates of 118 candidates in total.

There were multiple attempts to run a "Third Slate" of candidates. The Better Government Association of Chicago, along with some downstate politicians, presented a "blue ribbon" slate of candidates. However, with both parties putting up what were deemed to be acceptable slates of candidates, and Republicans choosing not to renominate the West Side bloc and nominating some blue ribbon candidates instead, this Third Slate effort disbanded.

Another attempt to put a Third Slate on the ballot was backed by various civil rights groups and labor unions, including the International Brotherhood of Electrical Workers and the United Auto Workers. Their planned platform focused on election reform and civil rights. The Third Slate intended on nominating 59 candidates, allowing a voter to straight-ticket vote for the slate as well as one of the two major parties. However, this Third Slate failed to make the ballot, with the Illinois State Board of Elections ruling on August 21 that they had failed to gather the 25,000 signatures necessary.

Popular names were picked to run on each party's ticket. Democrats nominated Adlai Stevenson III, the son of Adlai Stevenson II (a popular former governor), and John A. Kennedy, a businessman with a similar name (but no relation) to president John F. Kennedy, who had been assassinated the previous year. Republicans ran Earl D. Eisenhower, the brother of popular former president Dwight D. Eisenhower.

=== Ballot ===
The ballot for the State House election was separate from the ballot for other concurrent elections. Voters were allowed to cast up to 177 votes, with a straight-ticket voting option available to vote for all 118 candidates of a party's slate. Voters who voted straight-ticket could also vote for up to 59 candidates from the other party. Both parties recommended utilizing straight-ticket voting. The ballot was 33 inches (84 cm) long and was often referred to as the "bedsheet ballot".

Both parties used the same method to order their candidates on the ballot. Incumbent legislators were placed at the top, ordered by seniority, alternating between candidates from Cook County and downstate. The remaining candidates were then listed, also alternating between Cook County and downstate candidates.

There were four ballots given to voters in 1964: a white ballot, containing most of the typical races (such as for president and governor); a green ballot, voting on the retention elections for various judges; a blue ballot, containing two constitutional amendments to be voted on; and the orange ballot, solely reserved for the House of Representatives election. Before the election, the sheer number of ballots to be voted on led to predictions of a high number of undervotes in the House of Representatives election, but post-election analysis revealed that this did not take place.

=== Campaigning and endorsements ===
Both parties encouraged a straight-ticket vote. Republicans explicitly discouraged voting for any Democratic candidates, arguing that voting for Democrats would cause the legislature to become controlled by Richard J. Daley, the mayor of Chicago. The Democratic campaign, run by the Democratic State Central Committee, argued that a straight-ticket vote would "assure representation from every district in Illinois". Individual candidates for the legislature generally avoided campaigning across the state, instead only campaigning around their home region, if at all.

Many newspapers endorsed a partisan slate. The Field Enterprises newspapers, (Note: Includes the Chicago Daily News and the Chicago Sun-Times.) the Chicago Tribune, the Champaign News-Gazette, and the Illinois State Journal endorsed the Republican slate. However, the Illinois State Register, which was, like the Illinois State Journal, under Copley ownership, had a different editorial team and endorsed the Democratic slate. Given the unique electoral system allowing voters to vote for candidates of both parties, some newspapers made bipartisan endorsements of candidates, either in addition to their partisan endorsements, or without making an overall partisan endorsement. The Lindsay-Schaub group (Note: Includes The Southern Illinoisan, the Champaign–Urbana Courier, the Decatur Herald and Review, and the East St. Louis Journal.) of newspapers endorsed 48 Democrats and 48 Republicans after sending a questionnaire to all candidates in the election, suggesting voters choose a straight-ticket and all of the newspaper's endorsed candidates of the opposing party. Likewise, the Daily Herald, a newspaper serving the suburbs of Chicago, endorsed seven candidates (four Republicans and three Democrats) who they believed had a good understanding of suburban issues.

== Results ==
=== Reporting ===
Results were not known immediately after the election; while the results in other statewide races were known on November 4, the statewide tally and canvass for the House elections took multiple weeks. Based on early reported returns in some downstate precincts, Democrats declared victory on November 4, predicting that they had elected their entire slate. However, Republicans did not yet concede, believing they still had a chance of victory. Cook County's results were fully counted by November 9, though not reported until later. Unofficial results for 100 counties, excluding Cook and DuPage, were reported on November 26, showing a strong performance by Democrats. Unofficial statewide results were reported on December 3, showing that every Democratic candidate had won, with many Republican incumbents losing re-election.

Five Republican candidates (Note: Lewis V. Morgan, Jack T. Knuepfer, Jack Bowers, Arthur J. Reis, and Edward A. Bundy) obtained an injunction over the results in DuPage County, claiming that there were errors in the vote count in five precincts. The injunction was issued by circuit judge Philip Locke on November 30. After the release of statewide results, it became apparent that the discrepancies would not affect the overall balance of power in the legislature. On December 14, Democratic Attorney General William G. Clark filed a motion to move the case to the Illinois Supreme Court, to force the vote count to be released. The Illinois Supreme Court acted on this on January 6, 1965, releasing the DuPage results only hours before legislators were sworn in. Locke interpreted the Supreme Court's order as allowing him to order recounts in certain precincts, which he did. The recounts found only minor errors with no significant impact on the results.

=== Analysis ===
Elected members by county

Number of members elected from each county
91 members
5 members
4 members
3 members
2 members
1 member

Partisanship of each county's delegation
Only Democrats
Majority Democrats
Only Republicans
Majority Republicans
Tied

No members

Straight-ticket votes elected Democrats to the majority, with every Democrat receiving more votes than any Republican, resulting in the election of all 118 Democratic candidates. The strong Democratic performance was attributed to coattails from Democratic president Lyndon B. Johnson's victory over Republican Barry Goldwater in the 1964 United States presidential election in Illinois. However, voters who did not vote only straight-ticket had a significant impact as well: they determined the 59 Republicans who were elected, as well as the order of the winning Democratic candidates.

Contrary to many preelection predictions, voting was not driven by ballot order, with little correlation between where candidates were placed on the ballot and how many votes they received. The top-placing Democrat was Adlai E. Stevenson III, while the top-placing Republican was Earl D. Eisenhower. Both were listed on the bottom half of their respective side of the ballot (Stevenson was the 102nd Democratic candidate listed, and Eisenhower the 79th Republican). The results were strongly influenced by endorsements. In downstate Illinois, these were mainly those of the Illinois Agricultural Association and the Illinois AFL-CIO, as well as the Lindsay-Schaub group of downstate newspapers. However, the election was mainly decided in Chicago and its suburbs, where the endorsements of the Field Enterprises newspapers, and to a lesser extent the Chicago American, were mostly responsible for the results. There were also relatively few undervotes; post-election estimates showed that only about 5% of those who voted in the presidential election did not vote in the House election.

Among the Democrats elected, 68 were incumbents while 50 were new members, and among the Republicans, 31 were incumbents and 28 were new members. 37 incumbent Republicans who ran for reelection lost their seats. Geographically, candidates living in Cook County won a narrow majority of seats. About half of counties had no representatives, and a majority of representatives from both Cook County and from downstate were Democrats. (Note: The exact membership counts differ slightly between McDowell 2007 and the 1965–1966 Illinois Blue Book, which it cites as its source.)

1964 Illinois House of Representatives election
Party	Candidate	Votes	%
Democratic	Adlai E. Stevenson III	2,417,978	0.46%
Democratic	John K. Morris (incumbent)	2,410,365	0.46%
Democratic	Anthony Scariano (incumbent)	2,385,622	0.45%
Democratic	John P. Touhy (incumbent)	2,378,228	0.45%
Democratic	Abner J. Mikva (incumbent)	2,377,439	0.45%
Democratic	William A. Redmond (incumbent)	2,371,134	0.45%
Democratic	Joseph T. Connelly	2,369,556	0.45%
Democratic	John E. Cassidy, Jr.	2,368,063	0.45%
Democratic	John A. Kennedy	2,367,755	0.45%
Democratic	Bernard M. Peskin (incumbent)	2,367,287	0.45%
Democratic	Chester P. Majewski (incumbent)	2,366,785	0.45%
Democratic	Daniel M. Pierce	2,364,469	0.45%
Democratic	James P. Loukas (incumbent)	2,363,338	0.45%
Democratic	Esther Saperstein (incumbent)	2,361,847	0.45%
Democratic	Mrs. Dorah Grow	2,360,574	0.45%
Democratic	Harold D. Stedelin	2,358,491	0.45%
Democratic	Lloyd (Curly) Harris (incumbent)	2,357,709	0.45%
Democratic	Paul F. Elward (incumbent)	2,357,524	0.45%
Democratic	William E. Hartnett	2,356,700	0.45%
Democratic	Marvin S. Lieberman	2,356,576	0.45%
Democratic	Robert E. Mann (incumbent)	2,356,342	0.45%
Democratic	Harold A. Katz	2,355,168	0.45%
Democratic	James Moran	2,354,684	0.45%
Democratic	Cecil A. Partee (incumbent)	2,351,757	0.45%
Democratic	Eugenia S. Chapman	2,351,257	0.45%
Democratic	Raymond J. Welsh, Jr. (incumbent)	2,349,573	0.45%
Democratic	Joe (Joseph) Callahan	2,348,350	0.45%
Democratic	J. W. (Bill) Scott (incumbent)	2,343,772	0.45%
Democratic	William Pierce (incumbent)	2,341,983	0.45%
Democratic	James C. Kirie	2,340,388	0.45%
Democratic	Edward A. Warman	2,340,263	0.45%
Democratic	Leland Rayson	2,339,745	0.45%
Democratic	E. J. (Zeke) Giorgi	2,339,506	0.45%
Democratic	Phillip C. Goldstick	2,337,565	0.44%
Democratic	John Merlo (incumbent)	2,337,425	0.44%
Democratic	Allen T. Lucas (incumbent)	2,333,588	0.44%
Democratic	James A. McLendon	2,332,951	0.44%
Democratic	John M. Daley	2,332,665	0.44%
Democratic	Leland J. Kennedy (incumbent)	2,331,981	0.44%
Democratic	Paul E. Rink (incumbent)	2,331,722	0.44%
Democratic	James D. Carrigan (incumbent)	2,330,860	0.44%
Democratic	Joe W. Russell (incumbent)	2,330,466	0.44%
Democratic	Melvin McNairy	2,328,466	0.44%
Democratic	Harold Washington	2,328,125	0.44%
Democratic	John Jerome (Jack) Hill (incumbent)	2,328,023	0.44%
Democratic	Clyde Lee (incumbent)	2,326,629	0.44%
Democratic	Clyde L. Choate (incumbent)	2,324,383	0.44%
Democratic	Charles Ed Schaefer (incumbent)	2,324,100	0.44%
Democratic	James D. Holloway (incumbent)	2,323,732	0.44%
Democratic	Chester R. Wiktorski, Jr. (incumbent)	2,321,044	0.44%
Democratic	Robert V. Walsh (incumbent)	2,320,956	0.44%
Democratic	William J. Schoeninger	2,320,724	0.44%
Democratic	James Von Boeckman	2,320,580	0.44%
Democratic	Roy Curtis Small	2,320,211	0.44%
Democratic	C. R. (Butch) Ratcliffe (incumbent)	2,318,456	0.44%
Democratic	Joseph P. Stremlau (incumbent)	2,316,029	0.44%
Democratic	Francis X. Mahoney	2,315,855	0.44%
Democratic	Carl H. Wittmond (incumbent)	2,315,638	0.44%
Democratic	Miles E. Mills (incumbent)	2,315,065	0.44%
Democratic	Elmo (Mac) McClain	2,314,645	0.44%
Democratic	Corneal A. Davis (incumbent)	2,313,943	0.44%
Democratic	Robert Craig (incumbent)	2,313,925	0.44%
Democratic	Tobias (Toby) Barry (incumbent)	2,312,923	0.44%
Democratic	Fred J. Schraeder	2,312,797	0.44%
Democratic	William A. Moore, M.D.	2,311,742	0.44%
Democratic	Bert Baker (incumbent)	2,311,412	0.44%
Democratic	Leo F. O'Brien	2,309,250	0.44%
Democratic	John J. McNichols	2,306,601	0.44%
Democratic	Leo Pfeffer (incumbent)	2,306,163	0.44%
Democratic	John W. Alsup (incumbent)	2,306,002	0.44%
Democratic	Michael H. McDermott (incumbent)	2,305,217	0.44%
Democratic	Frank C. Wolf (incumbent)	2,304,540	0.44%
Democratic	William J. Frey	2,303,934	0.44%
Democratic	Dan E. Costello (incumbent)	2,303,723	0.44%
Democratic	Daniel O'Neill	2,303,161	0.44%
Democratic	Howard R. Slater	2,301,528	0.44%
Democratic	Charles F. Armstrong (incumbent)	2,301,421	0.44%
Democratic	Michael E. Hannigan (incumbent)	2,299,077	0.44%
Democratic	H. B. Tanner	2,298,128	0.44%
Democratic	Thomas J. Hanahan, Jr.	2,297,898	0.44%
Democratic	Francis J. Loughran (incumbent)	2,297,846	0.44%
Democratic	Frank X. Downey (incumbent)	2,296,178	0.44%
Democratic	Joseph Fennessey	2,295,190	0.44%
Democratic	Dan Teefey (incumbent)	2,293,692	0.44%
Democratic	Joseph Tumpach	2,293,423	0.44%
Democratic	Leo B. Obernuefemann	2,292,278	0.44%
Democratic	Matt Ropa (incumbent)	2,291,587	0.44%
Democratic	James Y. Carter (incumbent)	2,291,419	0.44%
Democratic	Henry M. Lenard (incumbent)	2,291,033	0.44%
Democratic	Oral (Jake) Jacobs	2,290,242	0.44%
Democratic	John J. Houlihan	2,289,912	0.44%
Democratic	Frank J. Smith (incumbent)	2,287,950	0.44%
Democratic	Omer Sanders	2,287,943	0.44%
Democratic	Kenneth W. Course (incumbent)	2,285,860	0.43%
Democratic	Sam Romano (incumbent)	2,285,599	0.43%
Democratic	LaSalle J. DeMichaels	2,285,455	0.43%
Democratic	Andrew A. Euzzino (incumbent)	2,284,415	0.43%
Democratic	William A. Giblin	2,284,254	0.43%
Democratic	John P. Downes (incumbent)	2,283,416	0.43%
Democratic	John G. Fary (incumbent)	2,283,240	0.43%
Democratic	Edward J. Shaw (incumbent)	2,283,155	0.43%
Democratic	Peter J. Whalen (incumbent)	2,281,873	0.43%
Democratic	Robert F. McPartlin (incumbent)	2,281,797	0.43%
Democratic	John M. Vitek (incumbent)	2,281,726	0.43%
Democratic	John F. Leon (incumbent)	2,281,623	0.43%
Democratic	Edward F. Sensor	2,281,431	0.43%
Democratic	Joseph F. Fanta	2,281,018	0.43%
Democratic	Bernard B. Wolfe	2,280,958	0.43%
Democratic	Nicholas Zagone (incumbent)	2,280,192	0.43%
Democratic	Edward W. Wolbank (incumbent)	2,279,315	0.43%
Democratic	Frank Lyman (incumbent)	2,279,018	0.43%
Democratic	Peter M. Callan (incumbent)	2,278,241	0.43%
Democratic	Calvin L. Smith	2,278,068	0.43%
Democratic	Frank J. Broucek	2,276,080	0.43%
Democratic	Benedict Garmisa	2,275,684	0.43%
Democratic	Nick Svalina (incumbent)	2,275,432	0.43%
Democratic	Otis G. Collins	2,274,028	0.43%
Democratic	Lawrence DiPrima (incumbent)	2,262,258	0.43%
Republican	Earl D. Eisenhower	2,191,826	0.42%
Republican	Charles W. Clabaugh (incumbent)	2,186,592	0.42%
Republican	John Clinton Youle	2,184,069	0.42%
Republican	William E. Pollack (incumbent)	2,178,460	0.41%
Republican	Noble W. Lee (incumbent)	2,177,503	0.41%
Republican	Paul J. Randolph	2,176,388	0.41%
Republican	Mrs. Robert (Marjorie) Pebworth	2,175,501	0.41%
Republican	Frances L. Dawson (incumbent)	2,173,989	0.41%
Republican	Lawrence X. Pusateri	2,172,480	0.41%
Republican	Carl W. Soderstrom (incumbent)	2,172,032	0.41%
Republican	George F. Sisler	2,171,458	0.41%
Republican	John C. Parkhurst (incumbent)	2,169,751	0.41%
Republican	John W. Carroll (incumbent)	2,169,659	0.41%
Republican	Terrel E. Clarke (incumbent)	2,167,451	0.41%
Republican	Albert W. Hachmeister (incumbent)	2,166,786	0.41%
Republican	William D. Walsh (incumbent)	2,166,243	0.41%
Republican	J. David Jones	2,165,919	0.41%
Republican	Mrs. Brooks McCormick	2,165,415	0.41%
Republican	William L. Blaser	2,163,785	0.41%
Republican	George Thiem	2,162,963	0.41%
Republican	Maj. Gen. Robert M. Woodward	2,161,782	0.41%
Republican	Thomas F. Railsback (incumbent)	2,161,428	0.41%
Republican	Harris Rowe (incumbent)	2,159,212	0.41%
Republican	Richard A. Walsh (incumbent)	2,158,621	0.41%
Republican	Arthur E. Simmons (incumbent)	2,157,072	0.41%
Republican	George M. Burditt	2,156,996	0.41%
Republican	Clarence E. Neff (incumbent)	2,156,668	0.41%
Republican	Lewis V. Morgan, Jr. (incumbent)	2,155,932	0.41%
Republican	Alan R. Johnston (incumbent)	2,155,834	0.41%
Republican	John H. Conolly (incumbent)	2,155,828	0.41%
Republican	Ronald A. Hurst	2,155,622	0.41%
Republican	John W. Lewis, Jr. (incumbent)	2,154,348	0.41%
Republican	Leslie N. Jones	2,153,681	0.41%
Republican	G. William Horsley (incumbent)	2,152,602	0.41%
Republican	John Henry Kleine	2,152,221	0.41%
Republican	Herbert F. Geisler	2,151,603	0.41%
Republican	James H. Oughton, Jr.	2,150,431	0.41%
Republican	Paul P. Boswell, M.D.	2,149,578	0.41%
Republican	Edward H. Jenison	2,149,326	0.41%
Republican	Mary K. Meany	2,147,427	0.41%
Republican	Eugene F. Schlickman	2,145,913	0.41%
Republican	W. Robert Blair	2,145,703	0.41%
Republican	Jack T. Knuepfer	2,143,965	0.41%
Republican	Ralph T. Smith (incumbent)	2,143,304	0.41%
Republican	Wayne Fitzgerrell (incumbent)	2,142,955	0.41%
Republican	Robert R. Canfield	2,142,725	0.41%
Republican	Carl L. Klein	2,142,638	0.41%
Republican	Francis J. Berry	2,142,274	0.41%
Republican	Stanley A. Papierz	2,141,662	0.41%
Republican	Ben S. Rhodes (incumbent)	2,141,539	0.41%
Republican	Don A. Moore (incumbent)	2,140,695	0.41%
Republican	Bernard McDevitt (incumbent)	2,139,731	0.41%
Republican	C. L. McCormick (incumbent)	2,138,193	0.41%
Republican	Jack Bowers	2,137,573	0.41%
Republican	Dr Edwin E. Dale (incumbent)	2,137,486	0.41%
Republican	Dean McCully (incumbent)	2,136,128	0.41%
Republican	Ed Lehman (incumbent)	2,134,749	0.41%
Republican	Michael A. Ruddy (incumbent)	2,134,681	0.41%
Republican	William J. "Bill" Cunningham	2,134,243	0.41%
Republican	W. K. (Kenny) Davidson (incumbent)	2,132,504	0.41%
Republican	Louis Janczak (incumbent)	2,132,011	0.41%
Republican	W. J. McDonald	2,130,597	0.41%
Republican	Joseph R. Hale (incumbent)	2,128,570	0.40%
Republican	Fred Branson (incumbent)	2,127,908	0.40%
Republican	Nick Keller	2,126,958	0.40%
Republican	Charles M. (Chuck) Campbell (incumbent)	2,126,209	0.40%
Republican	Edward McBroom (incumbent)	2,126,189	0.40%
Republican	George S. Brydia (incumbent)	2,126,047	0.40%
Republican	Harland D. Warren (incumbent)	2,125,539	0.40%
Republican	Robert J. Lehnhausen	2,124,841	0.40%
Republican	Charles K. Willett (incumbent)	2,124,588	0.40%
Republican	A. B. McConnell (incumbent)	2,124,433	0.40%
Republican	William F. Martin	2,123,689	0.40%
Republican	John E. Velde, Jr.	2,122,408	0.40%
Republican	Meade Baltz (incumbent)	2,121,885	0.40%
Republican	H. B. Ihnen (incumbent)	2,120,757	0.40%
Republican	John W. Johnson	2,119,621	0.40%
Republican	John J. Donovan (incumbent)	2,119,546	0.40%
Republican	Frank A. Marek (incumbent)	2,119,175	0.40%
Republican	Garrel Burgoon (incumbent)	2,118,800	0.40%
Republican	Edward M. Finfgeld (incumbent)	2,118,682	0.40%
Republican	Edward Schneider (incumbent)	2,118,514	0.40%
Republican	Raymond E. (Ray) Anderson (incumbent)	2,118,462	0.40%
Republican	Merle K. Anderson (incumbent)	2,118,328	0.40%
Republican	Orval W. Hittmeier (incumbent)	2,118,246	0.40%
Republican	Paul F. Jones (incumbent)	2,117,605	0.40%
Republican	Claude A. Walker (incumbent)	2,117,257	0.40%
Republican	J. Horace Gardner (incumbent)	2,116,919	0.40%
Republican	Hubert A. Dailey	2,116,519	0.40%
Republican	Bradley L. Manning	2,116,339	0.40%
Republican	Albert E. Bennett	2,116,319	0.40%
Republican	Charles O. Miller (incumbent)	2,116,139	0.40%
Republican	Kenneth W. Miller (incumbent)	2,116,012	0.40%
Republican	Marshall R. Schroeder	2,115,493	0.40%
Republican	George P. Johns (incumbent)	2,115,224	0.40%
Republican	Edwin A. McGowan (incumbent)	2,115,107	0.40%
Republican	Elwood Graham (incumbent)	2,114,521	0.40%
Republican	Arthur J. Reis	2,114,337	0.40%
Republican	Ben C. Blades (incumbent)	2,114,263	0.40%
Republican	Carl T. Hunsicker (incumbent)	2,114,146	0.40%
Republican	Allan L. "Al" Schoeberlein (incumbent)	2,113,809	0.40%
Republican	John F. Wall (incumbent)	2,113,500	0.40%
Republican	Oscar Hansen (incumbent)	2,113,266	0.40%
Republican	Paul K. Zeman	2,113,065	0.40%
Republican	Jack E. Walker (incumbent)	2,112,532	0.40%
Republican	Edward A. Bundy	2,111,052	0.40%
Republican	Sydney L. "Syd" Perkins	2,109,299	0.40%
Republican	Eugene T. Devitt	2,108,237	0.40%
Republican	Jack D. Songer	2,107,794	0.40%
Republican	David W. Johnson	2,105,944	0.40%
Republican	Richard L. LoDestro (incumbent)	2,104,909	0.40%
Republican	James D. Heiple	2,104,813	0.40%
Republican	Romie J. Palmer	2,103,232	0.40%
Republican	J. Theodore Meyer	2,103,129	0.40%
Republican	Raymond J. Kahoun (incumbent)	2,098,387	0.40%
Republican	Norbert L. Lundberg	2,098,300	0.40%
Republican	Alfred B. Two	2,098,286	0.40%
Republican	Hellmut W. Stolle (incumbent)	2,094,314	0.40%
Total votes		525,723,540	100%

== Aftermath ==
The results provided a significant shake-up of the balance of power in the state. While Republicans maintained control of the Illinois Senate, Democrats held the governorship and won a two-thirds supermajority in the State House. Democrats elected John P. Touhy as the speaker of the House.

=== Governmental reform ===
The election of many "blue ribbon" candidates in both parties led to a focus on governmental reform, especially improvements to the operation of the legislature. The legislature formed the Illinois Commission on the Organization of the General Assembly, chaired by state representative Harold A. Katz. In 1967, the commission published a report—Improving the State Legislature—detailing 87 improvements it found that could be made to state government. Building on this, the 75th General Assembly (elected in 1966) proposed a constitutional convention, which was approved by voters in 1968, creating the Sixth Illinois Constitutional Convention. The convention was successful in creating a new constitution, which was approved by voters in 1970.

=== Redistricting ===
One of the first matters the newly elected legislature had to consider was redistricting. New maps for the State House had to be passed to avoid another at-large election, while new maps for the State Senate had to be passed to comply with the U.S. Supreme Court's ruling in Reynolds v. Sims, which required that state legislature districts be roughly equal in population. There was again difficulty in passing maps, with downstate and Chicago legislators not wanting to give up representation in favor of the suburbs, which had grown their relative share of the population. In the end, the Illinois Supreme Court and the United States District Court for the Northern District of Illinois agreed on a new map for the State Senate in compliance with Reynolds v. Sims, while a legislative committee appointed by the governor was responsible for redistricting the House. (Note: Scott v. Germano, 381 U.S. 407 (Supreme Court of the United States June 1, 1965).) The resulting maps were relatively fair to both parties, although they caused a significant shift of power from downstate to the Chicago area.

Illinois's constitution was rewritten in 1970. The new constitution modified the procedures for redistricting, adding a tie-breaking member to the redistricting commission that would be established if the legislature failed to redistrict. The tie-breaking member would only be added if the commission deadlocked, and would be randomly chosen by the Secretary of State, with one candidate nominated by each party.

The legislative process was not successful for redistricting in 1971, 1981, 1991, or 2001, necessitating a commission be formed in each case. In 1971, the commission was successful without a tie-breaker. A tie-breaker was needed in 1981, with a Democrat being chosen by Secretary of State Jim Edgar; the resulting map was biased in favor of the Democratic Party. In 1991, the legislature, controlled by Democrats, passed a map that was vetoed by now-governor Edgar. With the commission initially unsuccessful, Secretary of State George Ryan chose a Republican for the tie-breaker. However, the Illinois Supreme Court, controlled by Democrats, rejected the commission's initial plan, threatening an at-large election if the commission could not create a valid plan. Ryan described this as a potential constitutional crisis. The commission eventually enacted a map that survived court challenges after a Democrat on the court voted with the court's Republicans to uphold the map. In 2001, the commission needed a tie-breaker, with Secretary of State Jesse White selecting a Democrat by pulling a name out of a stovepipe hat; the commission passed its maps on a party-line basis.

The failure of the legislature to redistrict in six consecutive redistricting cycles (between 1963 and 2001), as well as the commission failing in most of those years without a tie-breaker, has received significant criticism. Politicians have been described as choosing to play "redistricting roulette" in attempts to get a favorable map, instead of compromising to draw a fair one. As of 2001, Illinois was the only state to use a randomly selected tie-breaker for its redistricting commission.

This was the only time in which a state legislative election was held at-large in the United States. However, at-large elections have been held for all of a state's congressional seats when states have failed to pass a congressional map. (Note: The U.S. Congress did not pass legislation requiring states redistrict following the 1930 United States census. Following this, in 1932, Kentucky, Minnesota, Missouri, North Dakota, and Virginia elected their House members at-large with plurality block voting. North Dakota continued to do so until 1960. Arizona did so in 1942, 1944, and 1946. Following the loss of a congressional seat in the 1960 United States census, Alabama elected all of its members at-large in 1962. New Mexico elected their members at-large starting in 1942, and Hawaii in 1962; both states continued doing so until this practice was banned in 1967 by the Uniform Congressional District Act.)

=== Members elected ===
The 1964 election helped launch the political careers of certain Democrats, including Adlai E. Stevenson III, who later represented Illinois in the U.S. Senate, and Harold Washington, who eventually became mayor of Chicago. The last member elected in 1964 to leave the House was Edolo J. Giorgi, a Democrat from Rockford, who served until his death in 1993.

In 2000, Pat Quinn, a state politician and future governor, proposed that some members of the Illinois legislature should be elected at-large, arguing that the 1964 election had produced many good legislators.
