= John D'Arco =

John D'Arco may refer to:

- John D'Arco Sr., American politician
- John D'Arco Jr., his son, American lawyer and attorney
