= Sisler =

Sisler or Šisler may refer to:

- Cathy Sisler, American artist
- Dave Sisler (1931–2011), former pitcher who played in Major League Baseball 1956–1962
- Dick Sisler (1920–1998), American player, coach and manager in Major League Baseball
- George Sisler (disambiguation), several people with this name, including:
  - George Sisler (1893–1973), American Major League Baseball first baseman and member of the National Baseball Hall of Fame
- Jan Šisler (born 1988), Czech footballer
- Jiří Šisler (born 1984), Czech footballer

== See also ==
- Sisler High School, the largest high school in the province of Manitoba with over 1700 students
- USNS Sisler (T-AKR-311), one of Military Sealift Command's nineteen Large, Medium-Speed Roll-on/Roll-off Ships
