= John W. Keogh =

American businessman (1862–1947)

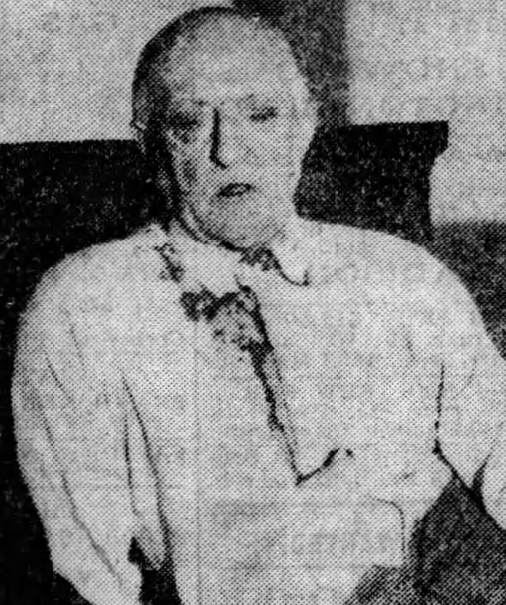
- Keogh in 1936
- Born: November 10, 1862; Chicago, Illinois, U.S.
- Died: August 24, 1947 (aged 84); Chester, Illinois, U.S.
- Occupations: Businessman, activist
- Known for: Killing attorney Christopher Kinney in court

John William Keogh (November 10, 1862 – August 24, 1947) was an American realty owner, redistricting advocate, and frequent pro se litigant in the Chicago area. He gained attention for the numerous legal cases he was involved in during the 1930s, in which he prominently raised the issue of Illinois having malapportioned legislative and congressional maps. He was best known for killing opposing attorney Christopher Kinney in a 1936 court case, again citing the need for redistricting as his motive; he was eventually declared insane for this and confined at a psychiatric hospital for the rest of his life.

== Early life and career ==
Keogh was born in 1862, the oldest of four children of William Henry Keogh (25 December 1826 – 26 December 1899) from the village of Gurtnanoe in Kilvellane, County Tipperary, Ireland, and Lura Dolly (née Benjamin, 21 November 1837 – 22 September 1914) from Truxton, New York. He inherited significant real estate from his father in 1899.

Keogh was responsible for the unusual shape of the London Guarantee Building in Chicago: he owned, and refused to sell, a property that was surrounded by the planned site of the building. Alfred S. Alschuler, the building's architect, designed the building to surround the property, using the area above Keogh's property as open space. Though the developers of the building eventually acquired Keogh's property in 1922, Alschuler kept the original outline, and only built to five stories on the portion that had been owned by Keogh.

== Court cases ==
Keogh was involved in at least a dozen court cases in the 1930s, in each case basing his arguments off of Illinois having malapportioned state legislative and congressional districts, as the state had not redistricted since 1901. Though not a member of the Illinois State Bar Association, Keogh represented himself in each case.

Keogh also was involved in multiple cases in Barnstable County, Massachusetts, as he had a summer home in Harwich Port. In one case, he successfully fought a traffic ticket he had received for keeping his vehicle in Massachusetts for multiple months while retaining an Illinois registration; he cited Dred Scott v. Sandford in arguing that he had the freedom to move his property between states. In another, he unsuccessfully fought a $0.50 plumbers' fee from the town of Harwich Port, despite the offer of the plumbers to waive the fee, with the goal of assessing whether the fee was constitutional.

=== Keogh v. Neely ===
In 1930, Keogh sought to avoid paying his 1929 federal income taxes by arguing Illinois's malapportioned districts violated the Guarantee Clause of the Constitution, and the federal government's failure to force Illinois to adopt fair districts invalidated its ability to levy taxes. The legality of the Revenue Act of 1928 was specifically challenged. The case was heard by judges Samuel Alschuler, Evan Alfred Evans, and William Morris Sparks, at the Court of Appeals for the Seventh Circuit. The court dismissed Keogh's arguments in 1931.

=== Keogh v. Horner ===
In 1934, Keogh sued to prevent certificates of election from being issued to those elected in the state's U.S. House elections by governor Henry Horner, arguing that the districts members had been elected on were illegal as they had not been reapportioned following the 1930 United States census. The case was heard by judge James Earl Major in the Southern District of Illinois on November 19. Assistant attorney general Manford Cox, on behalf of attorney general Otto Kerner, filed to dismiss the case, arguing that the federal court had no jurisdiction to determine who should sit in Congress, and that the governor had no authority to deny certification of the election, as he was not undertaking a judicial action. On November 21, Major ruled in favor of the state, dismissing the case.

=== Murder of Christopher Kinney ===
Keogh had taken out a $250,000 mortgage against a property he owned on Michigan Avenue with the New England Mutual Life Insurance Company. In 1934, the company repossessed the building and received an additional $25,000 deficiency judgement against Keogh in February 1935. The company, represented by Christopher G. Kinney, then sought access to a trust fund Keogh had established to cover this debt.

The case was heard by Cook County Circuit Court judge John Prystalski on January 13, 1936. Keogh argued that the case should be dismissed, arguing that the lack of reapportionment in the state resulted in the court lacking authority. Prystalski attempted to interrupt Keogh multiple times, infuriating him. Finally, Prystalski called for a bailiff to remove Keogh from the court room, at which point Keogh revealed a pistol and shot at both Prystalski and Kinney. Prystalski ducked and avoided being hit, while Kinney was shot through the heart at point-blank range, killing him almost instantly.

=== Arrest and prosecution ===
Immediately after killing Kinney, Keogh was disarmed and arrested by deputy sheriff John W. Ryan, with help from attorneys Jacob Legion Tenny and Stanislaus E. Basinski. He was then taken to Francis J. Gerty, the director of the Cook County psychopathic hospital, for assessment. Gerty declared him insane, saying that he had paranoia and senility. However, after a discussion with Gerty, Charles S. Dougherty, an assistant state's attorney, decided to prosecute Keogh anyway, as a finding of insanity in criminal court would significantly decrease Keogh's chances of being released in the future. During interrogation, Keogh indicated that he had no ill will towards either Kinney or Prystalski, and that he attempted to kill them only to bring attention to the cause of reapportionment.

A grand jury was asked on January 15 to indict Keogh for the murder. Following his indictment, a jury trial was held on January 17 to determine Keogh's sanity. Despite unanimous agreement between Dougherty, Keogh's daughter's attorney Albert S. Long, and public defender Benjamin Bachrach, that he was insane, Keogh objected to the declaration, arguing that he instead would like to enter a not guilty plea on the basis of self-defense. He then entered into a forty-five-minute diatribe on the subject of reapportionment, discussing his past legal cases on the subject. Many parts of his speech were humorous, causing laughter in the courtroom. After the speech, the jury declared Keogh sane and fit to stand trial for Kinney's murder, surprising the judge and all attorneys involved with the case.

On January 21, judge Denis J. Normoyle ordered another hearing to determine Keogh's sanity, ruling that the jury's initial finding was "manifestly against the weight of the evidence". Keogh attacked this hearing as unlawful, and objected to being represented by Long. The second hearing was held to determine Keogh's sanity on February 3. Keogh again discussed reapportionment, arguing that his actions had been those of a "clever, inventive lawyer". The jury, impressed by Keogh's arguments, initially could not come to a decision, but then ruled that he was insane on February 5. Keogh, continuing to act as his own lawyer, appealed the jury's determination, but was overruled by judge Joseph Burke on February 17. He was then transferred to the Chester Mental Health Center on March 14.

== Personal life, death, and legacy ==
Keogh's wife, Ruth Chamberlin Keogh, died on December 16, 1905. Keogh had a daughter, Ruth Keogh Dickinson, who lived in Covina, California, at the time of his murder trial. She fought on his behalf in court for him to be declared insane. Keogh had a summer home in Harwich Port, Massachusetts.

Keogh remained in the Chester Mental Health Center until his death in 1947.

Keogh's efforts gained more attention in the early 1950s, with an increasing interest in reapportionment in the state. This eventually led to the successful 1954 Illinois legislative apportionment amendment, which required the Illinois House of Representatives be redistricted each decade. Historian James L. McDowell took a dim view of Keogh, writing that while the cause of reapportionment was important, Keogh was primarily self-interested. McDowell unfavorably compares him to John B. Fergus, another Chicagoan who spent significant effort lobbying for redistricting in the 1920s by filing numerous lawsuits with the goal of forcing redistricting.
