= John Downes =

John Downes may refer to:

- John Downes (regicide) (1609–c. 1666), English commissioner convicted of regicide of Charles I of England at the restoration of Charles II
- John Downes (prompter) (died c. 1712), English theatre prompter for most of the Restoration period, 1660–1700
- John Downes (naval officer) (1786–1854), American commodore and ship captain in the United States Navy
- John Downes (admiral), rear admiral in the United States Navy during World War II
- John Downes (sailor) (1870–1943), British Olympic sailing gold medalist in 1908
- John Downes (runner), Irish athlete at the 1996 IAAF World Cross Country Championships – Senior men's race
- John K. Downes (1879–1944), Canadian politician, member of the Legislative Assembly of Manitoba, 1922–1927
- John P. Downes, member of the Illinois House of Representatives
- Sean Downes (1962–1984), known as John, ex-PIRA member who died when he was shot in the chest with a plastic bullet during the Troubles

== See also ==
- John Downs (disambiguation)
