= Ben Rhodes =

Ben Rhodes may refer to:

- Ben Rhodes (racing driver) (born 1997), American racing driver
- Ben Rhodes (sailor) (born 1981), British sailor
- Ben Rhodes (White House staffer) (born 1977), podcaster, political commentator, and former deputy national security advisor and assistant to US President Barack Obama
- Ben S. Rhodes, member of the Illinois House of Representatives
