= Fred Branson =

Fred Branson may refer to:

- Fred P. Branson (1881–1960), justice of the Oklahoma Supreme Court
- Fred Branson (politician) (1916–1985), member of the Illinois House of Representatives

== See also ==
- Frederick Woodward Branson, British chemist, glassblower, instrument maker and X-ray pioneer
