= Daniel O'Neill =

Dan O'Neill or Daniel O'Neill may refer to:

- Dan O'Neill (Gaelic footballer) (1933–2015), Irish Gaelic footballer
- Dan O'Neill (born 1942), American cartoonist
- Dan O'Neill (born 1948), founder of Mercy Corps
- Dan O'Neill (writer) (born 1950), Alaskan author and journalist
- Daniel O'Neill (painter) (1920–1974), Irish Romantic painter
- Daniel O'Neill (Royalist) (c. 1612–1664), Irish army officer, politician and courtier
- Daniel O'Neill (editor) (1830–1877), editor and owner of the Pittsburgh Dispatch newspaper
- Daniel O'Neill (Illinois politician), member of the Illinois House of Representatives

== See also ==
- Danny O'Neil (born 1971), American football player
- Danny O'Neil (American football), American football player
