= William Hartnett =

William Hartnett may refer to:

- William J. Hartnett (1932–2016), member of the Ohio House of Representatives
- William E. Hartnett (1919–2002), member of the Illinois House of Representatives
- Will Ford Hartnett (born 1956), member of the Texas House of Representatives
