= Goldstick =

Goldstick is a surname. Notable people with the surname include:

- Dan Goldstick (born 1940), Canadian philosopher, writer, and political activist
- Oliver Goldstick (born 1961), American television screenwriter and producer
- Phillip C. Goldstick (born 1931), American politician
