= John A. D'Arco Jr. =

American lawyer

John A. D'Arco Jr. (born October 19, 1944) is a former attorney and Illinois state legislator.

Born in Chicago, Illinois, D'Arco went to the University of Miami. He then received his bachelor's degree from Loyola University Chicago and his law degree from DePaul University College of Law. He practiced law and was involved in the Democratic Party. D'Arco served in the Illinois House of Representatives from 1973 to 1977 and then in the Illinois Senate from 1977 to 1992. His father John D'Arco Sr. also served in the Illinois General Assembly and was investigated by the United States government involving his relationship with the Chicago Outfit because of Operation GAMBAT, but was never indicted. D'Arco Sr. died in Chicago, Illinois. D'Arco Jr. was tried and convicted by the United States government of corruption as a result of Operation GAMBAT. https://apnews.com/article/f02831030a0f0734c570036251b0e375

Mr. D'Arco moved from Chicago to Florida in 1995 and presently resides in Ft. Lauderdale. His website can be found at https://jadpoet.com/

== Notes ==
Illinois House of Representatives
Preceded by Victor A. Arrigo; Peter C. Granata; Matt Ropa	Member of the Illinois House of Representatives from the 20th district 1973–1977; Served alongside: Richard A. Carter, Marvin R. Dee, Douglas Huff, Ronald A. Stearney	Succeeded by Marco Domico
Illinois Senate
Preceded by Sam Romano	Member of the Illinois Senate from the 20th district 1977–1983	Succeeded by Beverly Fawell
Preceded by Aldo DeAngelis	Member of the Illinois Senate from the 10th district 1983–1992	Succeeded by James DeLeo
