= Frank Lyman =

Frank Lyman may refer to:

- Frank H. Lyman (1863–1957), justice of the Supreme Court of Arizona
- Frank E. Lyman (1866–1938), member of the Massachusetts House of Representatives
- Frank Lyman (Illinois politician) (1917–1986), member of the Illinois House of Representatives

== See also ==
- Francis M. Lyman (1840–1916), member of the Church of Jesus Christ of Latter-day Saints
