= Clabaugh =

Clabaugh is a surname. Notable people with the surname include:

- Charles W. Clabaugh (1900–1983), American educator, businessman, and politician
- Harry M. Clabaugh (1856–1914), American judge
- Moose Clabaugh (1901–1984), American baseball player
