= Paul Randolph =

Paul Randolph may refer to:

- Paul Randolph (Canadian football) (born 1968), Canadian football linebacker
- Paul Randolph (musician), musician with Jazzanova
- Paul J. Randolph, member of the Illinois House of Representatives
- Paul Randolph (Under the Dome), fictional character
- Paul Randolph, fictional character by Jo Sinclair

== See also ==
- Randolph E. Paul, tax lawyer
