= John Yule =

John Yule may refer to:

- John Yule (Canadian politician) (1812–1886), Canadian businessman and political figure
- John Yule (botanist) (1762–1827), Scottish physician and botanist
- John Yule (California politician) (1833–c. 1888), Scottish-born American politician

== See also ==
- John Clinton Youle, American news editor, meteorologist and politician
