= J. W. Scott =

J. W. Scott may refer to:

- J. W. Scott (Illinois politician), Illinois state representative
- J. W. Scott (Kansas politician), Kansas state representative and Speaker of the Kansas Territorial House of Representatives in 1861
