= John Leon =

John Leon may refer to:

- Sir John Leon, 4th Baronet (born 1934)
- John Paul Leon (1972–2021), comic artist
- John F. Leon, member of the Illinois House of Representatives
