= Ron Hurst =

Ron Hurst may refer to:

- Ron Hurst (ice hockey) (1931–2026), Canadian NHL player
- Ron Hurst (musician) (born c. 1950), American musician; past member of rock band Steppenwolf

== See also ==
- Ronald Alan Hurst (1930–2024), American politician
