= Joseph Fennessey =

American politician (1916–1998)

Member of the Illinois House of Representatives
- In office January 6, 1965 – December 31, 1975
- Preceded by: At-large district created
- Succeeded by: James M. Riccolo

Personal details
- Born: March 20, 1916 Wallace Township, Illinois
- Died: September 20, 1998 (aged 82) Ottawa, Illinois, U.S.
- Party: Democratic
- Profession: Farmer; Politician

Joseph Fennessey (March 20, 1916 – September 20, 1998) was an American politician who served as a member of the Illinois House of Representatives.

Joseph Fennessey was born in Wallace Township, LaSalle County, Illinois on March 20, 1916. He was elected to the Illinois House of Representatives in the 1964 election at-large election. He was sworn into office on January 6, 1965, and reelected five times. The stalled reapportionment process, the cause of the 1964 at-large election, was resolved by the Illinois Supreme Court in 1965. Fennessey was drawn into the 40th district, which included his home county of LaSalle, along with Livingston, Marshall, and Putnam counties. In the 1971 reapportionment, he was drawn into the 38th district. He retained LaSalle and Livingston counties, but shed Marshall and Putnam counties while adding portions of DeKalb, Kane, and Kendall counties. He resigned from the Illinois House of Representatives to accept an appointment to serve as the Clerk of the Third District Appellate Court. He resigned December 31, 1975. The subsequent vacancy in the Illinois House was filled by twenty-seven year old James M. Riccolo of Dwight, Illinois, who had served as Fennessey's administrative assistant.

He retired as clerk effective October 15, 1985. He died at his home in Ottawa, Illinois on September 20, 1998, at the age of 82.
