= Hellmut W. Stolle =

American politician (1905–1977)

Member of the Illinois House of Representatives for the 14th district (1963–1965) and the 16th district (1967–1971)

Personal details
- Party: Republican

Hellmut W. Stolle (April 30, 1905 – October 1, 1977) was a German-born American politician from Illinois.

He was a member of the Illinois House of Representatives for the 14th district (1963–1965) and the 16th district (1967–1971).

In the 1964 Illinois House of Representatives election, he came in last place with the fewest votes cast, 2,094,314.

His second wife Eileen Stolle died on December 30, 2008.
