= John K. Morris =

American politician (1909–1995)

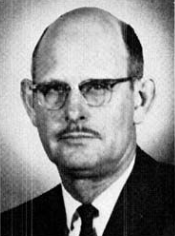
- Portrait from the 1965–1966 Illinois Blue Book

Member of the Illinois House of Representatives
- In office 1947 – January 11, 1967
- Constituency: At-large (1965–1967); 34th district (c. 1956)

Personal details
- Born: June 3, 1909 Lanark, Illinois, U.S.
- Died: January 15, 1995 (aged 85) Mount Carroll, Illinois, U.S.
- Party: Democratic
- Spouse: Ealy F. Grob (m. 1937; died 1991)
- Children: 2

John K. Morris (June 3, 1909 – January 15, 1995) was an American politician. He served as a member of the Illinois House of Representatives between 1947 and 1967. A member of the Democratic Party, he also served as justice of the peace from Carroll County.

== Early life and education ==
Morris was born on June 3, 1909, in Rock Creek Township. He graduated from Lanark High School in 1928, and received a Bachelor of Science in agriculture form the University of Illinois.

== Political career ==
Before being elected to the Illinois House of Representatives, Morris served as a justice of the peace.

=== Illinois House of Representatives ===
Morris was first elected to the Illinois House of Representatives in 1946 for the 12th district. He ran against two Republican candidates as a Democrat. As a member of the Illinois House of Representatives, he advocated for farmers' interests and tax reforms.

In 1955, Morris lead a filibuster in objection to bills that would authorize the construction of a large Chicago convention hall. The filibuster lasted a week and a half.

During the at-large 1964 Illinois House of Representatives election, Morris and 76 others were endorsed by the Better Government Association.

== Personal life and death ==
Morris resided in Chadwick, Illinois. Alongside politics, he was a farmer, real estate agent, and insurance broker. He had two children with his wife Ealy F. Grob, whom he married in 1937. Morris died at the Good Samaritan Nursing Home in Mount Carroll, Illinois, on January 15, 1995.
