= Cora Meek =

American artist (1889–2001)

- Born: 1889; Lerna, Illinois, United States
- Died: 2001 (aged 111–112); Charleston, Illinois, United States

Cora Meek (1889–2001) was an American quilter and supercentenarian. Her work is included in the collections of the Smithsonian American Art Museum, the Tarble Arts Center at Eastern Illinois University and the Art Institute of Chicago.
