= Sidney Korshak =

American lawyer (1907–1996)

- Born: June 6, 1907; Chicago, Illinois, U.S.
- Died: January 20, 1996 (aged 88); Beverly Hills, California, U.S.
- Resting place: Hillside Memorial Park
- Education: University of Wisconsin–Madison; DePaul University College of Law
- Occupations: Lawyer, fixer
- Spouse: Bernice Stewart (m. 1943)
- Children: 3

Sidney Roy Korshak (June 6, 1907 – January 20, 1996) was an American lawyer and "fixer" for businessmen in the upper echelons of power and the Chicago Outfit in the United States. His reputation as the Chicago mob's man in Los Angeles made him one of Hollywood's most fabled and influential fixers. His partnership with Chicago mobsters led him to be named "...the most powerful lawyer in the world" by the FBI.

== Early life ==
Sidney was born into a Jewish family, with four siblings, in Chicago's West Side Lawndale neighborhood, on June 6, 1907. His parents were Harry Korshak (1876–1931) and Rebecca Beatrice Lashkovitz (1883–1963), who were married on July 15, 1902, in Chicago. Sidney's father, Harry, was a wealthy Chicago contractor. Sidney's younger brother, Morris Jerome "Marshall" Korshak (1910–1996), became a longtime Chicago politician, city treasurer and state senator. Sidney attended Herzl Elementary School, the University of Wisconsin–Madison and obtained his law degree from the DePaul University College of Law.

== Career ==
Korshak's law practice brought him into contact with many mobsters, such as Al Capone, Frank Nitti, Sam Giancana, Tony Accardo and Moe Dalitz. His services were used by the upper ranks of both legitimate and illegitimate business in the United States.

Korshak numbered among his friends many Hollywood celebrities and leading figures in the entertainment industry, including MCA/Universal chiefs Jules C. Stein, Lew Wasserman and Sid Sheinberg, entertainment lawyer Paul Ziffren (the driving force behind bringing the 1984 Olympics to Los Angeles), MGM chief Kirk Kerkorian, Gulf+Western founder Charles Bluhdorn, Frank Sinatra, Ronald Reagan, William French Smith (labor attorney and future United States Attorney General), California governor Edmund "Pat" Brown and his son, California governor Edmund "Jerry" Brown, Governor of California Gray Davis, producer Robert Evans, Warren Beatty, Barron Hilton and Hugh Hefner.

Korshak was highly successful in the field of labor consulting and negotiations, and his client list included Hilton Hotels, Hyatt Hotels, MGM, Playboy, MCA/Universal, and Diners Club International. One of his clients was Jimmy Hoffa, notorious head of the International Brotherhood of Teamsters; Korshak was heavily involved in the Teamsters' west coast operations during a time when organized labor was at the peak of its activity.

Korshak was an attorney for various elements of the Chicago Outfit. Korshak bought the J.P. Seeburg Corporation immediately before the company stock rose from $35 to $141.50 a share. He then sold 143,000 shares to pivotal figures in the stock market including Bernard Cornfeld, who owned the FOF Property Fund, in Switzerland. Korshak received $5 million from the deal.

In 1954 he purchased $25,000 worth of stock in Allen Dorfman's insurance agency. In 1962 Korshak reached an agreement with Joe Glaser whereby he assigned all of the "voting rights, dominion and control" of his majority stock in the Associated Booking Corporation to both Korshak and himself. This meant that when Glaser died in 1969 control transferred to Korshak alone. Glaser designated Korhsak as the executor of his probate.

== Other ==
Sidney Korshak suggested actress Jill St. John to Eon Productions for the James Bond film, Diamonds Are Forever. Korshak had simultaneous affairs with St. John and actress Stella Stevens.

== Personal life ==
On August 17, 1943, Korshak married Bernice "Bee" Stewart (1919–2017), daughter of Omar Stewart (1884–1957) and Ethel (Granger) Stewart (1887–1983).

The couple had three children:

- Harry Stuart Korshak (born 1945)
- Stuart Rand Korshak (born 1947)
- Kathryn "Katy" Korshak (granddaughter whom Sidney and Bee adopted at age 5).

Korshak had a home in Bel Air, Los Angeles, not far from Hotel Bel-Air. He had a second home located in Palm Springs, California.

== Death ==
Sidney Korshak died on January 20, 1996, without ever having a criminal conviction against him (or even an indictment, according to his New York Times obituary). He was buried at the Hillside Memorial Park in Culver City, California. Marshall Korshak predeceased his brother by one day.

In 2021 it was announced that actor Jonah Hill would portrayed Korshak in a miniseries to be developed by William Monahan and titled "The Last Mogul". The series was set to focus on Korshak and his relationship with Lew Wasserman. Allen Shapiro and Mark Canton were designated executive producers.
