= John A. Kennedy (Illinois politician) =

American politician (1921–1997)

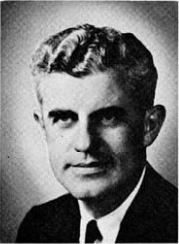
- Portrait from the 1965–1966 Illinois Blue Book

Member of the Illinois House of Representatives from the at-large district
- In office January 13, 1965 – January 11, 1967

Personal details
- Born: John Allen Kennedy; December 29, 1921 Chicago, Illinois, U.S.
- Died: August 17, 1997 (aged 75) Evanston, Illinois, U.S.
- Party: Democratic

John Allen Kennedy (December 29, 1921 – August 17, 1997) was an American politician and businessman.

== Early life and education ==
Kennedy was born on December 29, 1921, in Chicago. He attended Lane Tech College Prep High School and received a Bachelor of Science in Electrical Engineering degree from Northwestern University.

== Military and business career ==
Kennedy served in the United States Navy as an engineer from 1943 to 1946. He served at the Oak Ridge National Laboratory in 1943, working on the Manhattan Project. He then served in the Pacific for two years repairing electronics.

After the war, Kennedy worked for Motorola from 1946 to 1949. He then founded James Electronics, a manufacturer of electronic components.

Kennedy served on numerous boards, including those of the St. Elizabeth's, St. Anne's, and St. Francis hospitals. He was a trustee at Barat College and at Northwestern's Technological Institute.

== Political career ==
In 1962, Kennedy ran for Illinois's 13th congressional district, but lost to Republican candidate Donald Rumsfeld. Kennedy was the co-founder and vice-chairman of the Winnetka Democratic Club.

Kennedy was elected to the Illinois House of Representatives in the 1964 election, which was held at-large due to the legislature's failure to redistrict. Kennedy was nominated for the Democratic Party's ticket due to his name's similarity to the recently slain John F. Kennedy, to whom he was unrelated.

Kennedy chaired Lyndon B. Johnson's 1965 Task Force on Intergovernmental Information. He also helped create Illinois's Management Information Division during his time in the legislature.

Kennedy ran for Illinois's 1st Senate district in the 1966 Illinois Senate election, but lost to the Republican incumbent W. Russell Arrington.

== Personal life and death ==
Kennedy lived in Winnetka, Illinois. He had four sons and five daughters with his wife Mary Ann Bremner. He died on August 17, 1997, at the Saint Francis Hospital of Evanston.

== Electoral history ==
1962 Illinois's 13th congressional district election
Party	Candidate	Votes	%
Republican	Donald Rumsfeld	139,230	63.52%
Democratic	John A. Kennedy	79,419	36.23%
Write-in		542	0.25%
Total votes		219,191	100%

1966 Illinois's 1st Senate district election
Party	Candidate	Votes	%
Republican	W. Russell Arrington (incumbent)	55,080	70.54%
Democratic	John A. Kennedy	23,005	29.46%
Total votes		78,085	100%
