= Calvin Smith (Illinois politician) =

American politician

Calvin L. Smith

Member of the Illinois House of Representatives from the 24th district
- In office 1965–1969

Personal details
- Born: 1907 Springfield, Ohio
- Died: 1968 (aged 60–61) Chicago
- Party: Democratic
- Education: University of Illinois at Urbana-Champaign
- Occupation: Pharmacist
- Profession: Politician

Calvin L. Smith (1907-1968) was a pharmacist, coroner, and member of the Illinois House of Representatives from 1965 until his death in 1968. A Democrat, he represented the 24th District in the 74th and 75th sessions of the Illinois General Assembly.

Born in Springfield, Ohio, Smith moved to Chicago at a young age with his family. He became a pharmacist, receiving his pharmacy degree from the University of Illinois Urbana-Champaign and then owning and operating a pharmacy with his father for the next 15 years. From 1951 to 1952, he was president of the Chicago Pharmacists Association. He served as chief pharmacist of the Cook County Jail, and was appointed deputy coroner of Cook County in 1961.

An active participant in civil society, Smith was a member of the Alpha Phi Alpha fraternity, the Prince Hall Masons, and Chicago's Pilgrim Baptist Church. He served in the 4th ward Democratic Organization, as captain of the 15th precinct and as executive secretary of the ward organization.

Smith was first elected to the Illinois House in 1964. The 1964 election was unprecedented in that the House's previous failure to approve a redistricting plan caused all representatives to be elected statewide. As a result, all 118 House candidates on the statewide Democratic slate were elected. In the 1966 election, Smith contended with fellow first-time representative James A. McLendon to represent the 24th District, with neither able to consolidate support within the Democratic Party organization.

During his two terms of office, his contributions included his support of legislation to compensate teachers based on workload, and to establish apprenticeship programs for African American students. In 1966, he was one of the four founding members of the study committee that gave rise to the Illinois Legislative Black Caucus.

On June 29, 1968, during his second term, Smith died at Chicago's Michael Reese Hospital of a heart attack.

== Works cited ==
- Williams, Erma Brooks (2008). Political Empowerment of Illinois' African-American State Lawmakers from 1877 to 2005. University Press of America. ISBN 9780761840183.
