= George Sisler (disambiguation) =

George Sisler (1893–1973) was an American Major League Baseball player and member of the National Baseball Hall of Fame.

George Sisler may also refer to:

- George F. Sisler (1896 or 1897–1992), American politician and businessman
- George Sisler Jr. (1917–2006), American minor league baseball general manager and president of the International League, son of the aforementioned George Sisler
- George K. Sisler (1937–1967), United States Army officer, recipient of the Medal of Honor for his actions in the Vietnam War
