= 1960 United States Senate election in Illinois =

- November 8, 1960
- Turnout: 84.24%

Nominee	Paul Douglas	Samuel W. Witwer
Party	Democratic	Republican
Popular vote	2,530,945	2,093,846
Percentage	54.63%	45.20%
- County results Douglas: 50–60% 60–70% Witwer: 50–60% 60–70%
U.S. senator before election
Paul Douglas
Democratic
Elected U.S. Senator
Paul Douglas
Democratic

The 1960 United States Senate election in Illinois took place on November 8, 1960. Incumbent Democratic United States Senator Paul Douglas was reelected to a third term.

== Background ==
The primary (held on April 12) and general election coincided with those for other federal offices (president and house) and those for state elections.

Turnout in the primaries was 32.98%, with a total of 1,678,954 votes cast.

Turnout during the general election was 84.24%, with 4,632,796 votes cast.

== Democratic primary ==
Incumbent Paul Douglas was renominated, running unopposed.

=== Results ===
Democratic primary results
Party	Candidate	Votes	%
Democratic	Paul H. Douglas (incumbent)	916,951	100
Write-in		8	0.00
Total votes		916,959	100

== Republican primary ==
Samuel W. Witwer won a crowded Republican primary. Witwer was an attorney known for his work on both state and federal constitutional reforms.

=== Candidates ===
- John R. Harrell
- John W. Lewis Jr., Illinois state senator
- William H. Rentschler, newspaper publisher
- Samuel W. Witwer, attorney
- Warren E. Wright, former Illinois treasurer

=== Results ===
Republican primary results
Party	Candidate	Votes	%
Republican	Samuel W. Witwer	249,849	32.79
Republican	Warren E. Wright	226,449	29.72
Republican	William H. Rentschler	202,600	26.59
Republican	John W. Lewis, Jr.	48,989	6.43
Republican	John R. Harrell	34,106	4.48
Write-in		2	0.00
Total votes		761,995	100

== Socialist Labor nomination ==
The Socialist Labor Party of America nominated Louis Fisher.

== General election ==
=== Results ===
United States Senate election in Illinois, 1966
Party	Candidate	Votes	%
Democratic	Paul H. Douglas (incumbent)	2,530,943	54.63%
Republican	Samuel W. Witwer	2,093,846	45.20%
Socialist Labor	Louis Fisher	8,007	0.17%
Majority		437,097	9.43%
Turnout		4,632,796	
Democratic hold			

== See also ==
- 1960 United States Senate elections
