= Lerna, Illinois =

Lerna
- Village
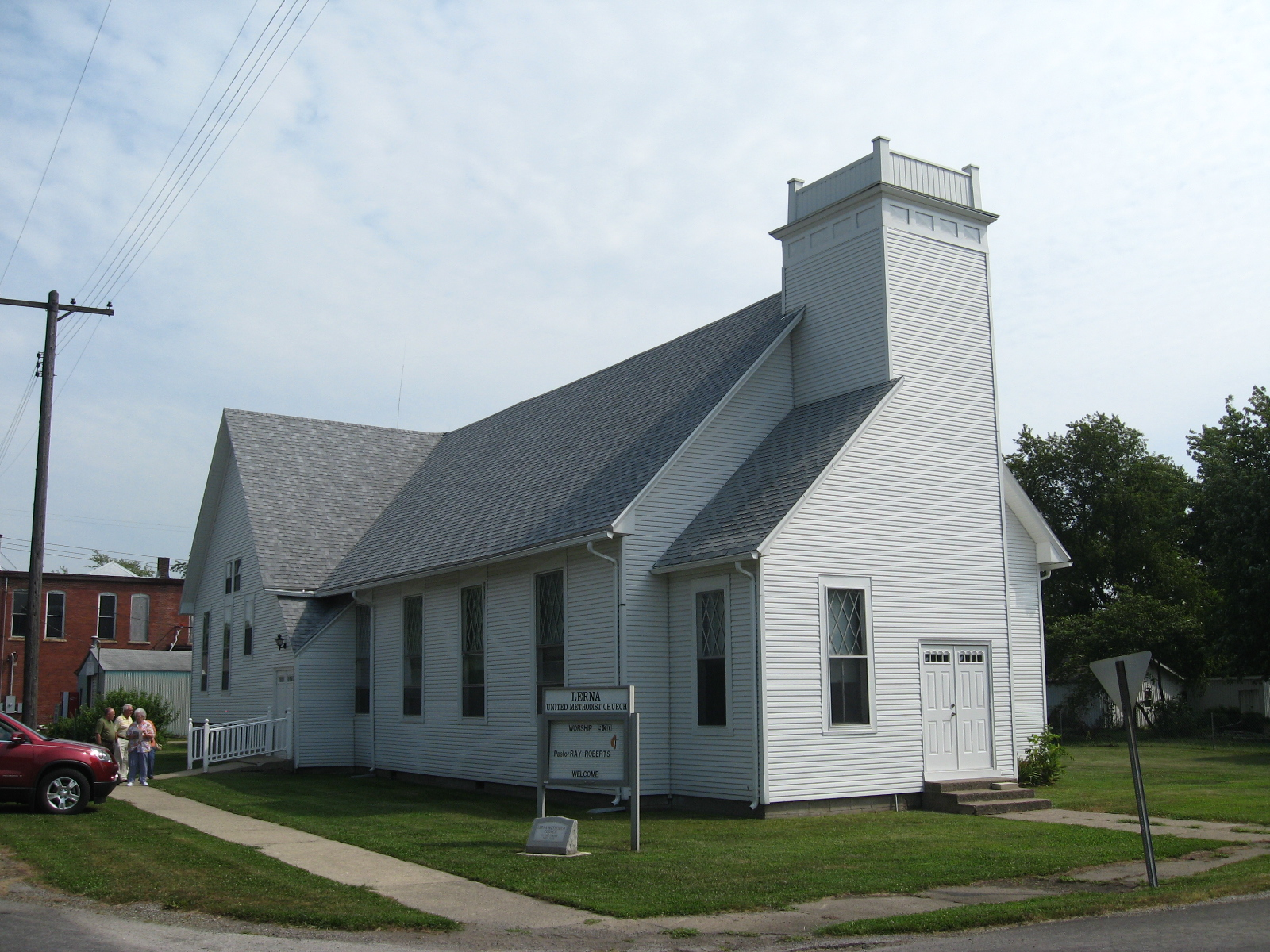
- Lerna United Methodist Church

- Location of Lerna in Coles County, Illinois.
- Coordinates: 39°25′04″N 88°17′20″W
- Country: United States
- State: Illinois
- County: Coles
- Township: Pleasant Grove

Area
  - Total: 0.12 sq mi (0.30 km^{2})
  - Land: 0.12 sq mi (0.30 km^{2})
  - Water: 0 sq mi (0.00 km^{2})
- Elevation: 751 ft (229 m)

Population (2020)
  - Total: 226
  - Density: 1,965.6/sq mi (758.91/km^{2})
- Time zone: UTC-6 (CST)
  - Summer (DST): UTC-5 (CDT)
- ZIP code: 62440
- Area code: 217
- FIPS code: 17-42938
- GNIS ID: 2398424

Lerna is a village in Coles County, Illinois, United States. The population was 226 at the 2020 census. It is part of the Charleston–Mattoon Micropolitan Statistical Area. Thomas Lincoln, the father of President Abraham Lincoln, spent the later part of his life on a homestead a few miles from Lerna, which is now preserved as the Lincoln Log Cabin State Historic Site. Thomas Lincoln and his second wife Sarah Bush Lincoln are buried in Shiloh Cemetery south of town.

== Geography ==
According to the 2021 census gazetteer files, Lerna has a total area of 0.12 square miles (0.31 km^{2}), all land.

== Demographics ==
Historical population
Census	Pop.	Note	%±
1900	396		—
1910	391		−1.3%
1920	366		−6.4%
1930	331		−9.6%
1940	301		−9.1%
1950	304		1.0%
1960	296		−2.6%
1970	288		−2.7%
1980	386		34.0%
1990	301		−22.0%
2000	322		7.0%
2010	286		−11.2%
2020	226		−21.0%
U.S. Decennial Census

As of the 2020 census there were 226 people, 110 households, and 69 families residing in the village. The population density was 1,965.22 inhabitants per square mile (758.78/km^{2}). There were 118 housing units at an average density of 1,026.09 per square mile (396.18/km^{2}). The racial makeup of the village was 94.25% White, 1.33% Asian, 0.44% from other races, and 3.98% from two or more races. Hispanic or Latino of any race were 1.77% of the population.

There were 110 households, out of which 18.2% had children under the age of 18 living with them, 49.09% were married couples living together, 0.91% had a female householder with no husband present, and 37.27% were non-families. 30.00% of all households were made up of individuals, and 12.73% had someone living alone who was 65 years of age or older. The average household size was 2.62 and the average family size was 2.28.

The village's age distribution consisted of 16.7% under the age of 18, 11.6% from 18 to 24, 25.5% from 25 to 44, 22.8% from 45 to 64, and 23.5% who were 65 years of age or older. The median age was 38.6 years. For every 100 females, there were 107.4 males. For every 100 females age 18 and over, there were 102.9 males.

The median income for a household in the village was $44,286, and the median income for a family was $54,583. Males had a median income of $30,625 versus $32,250 for females. The per capita income for the village was $19,442. About 8.7% of families and 20.2% of the population were below the poverty line, including 29.4% of those under age 18 and 5.1% of those age 65 or over.

== Transportation ==
Coles County Zipline provides dial-a-ride bus transit service to the city. The nearest passenger rail service is at Mattoon station, where Amtrak operates to Chicago, Carbondale, New Orleans, and other destinations.

== Education ==
Lerna, Illinois, Bridges School

It is in the Charleston Community Unit School District 1.

== Notable people ==
- Charles W. Clabaugh, Illinois state representative, educator, and businessman
- Cora Meek (1889–2001), quilter and supercentenarian
