= John Downs =

John Downs may refer to:

- John M. Downs (died 2019), American sketch artist
- John G. Downs (1873–1956), American farmer and politician from New York
- Johnny Downs (1913–1994), American child actor
- Dickie Downs (John Thomas Downs, 1886–1949), footballer

== See also ==
- John Downes (disambiguation)
