= George F. Sisler =

American politician and businessman

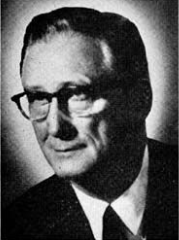
- Portrait from the 1965–1966 Illinois Blue Book

Member of the Illinois House of Representatives from the at-large district
- In office January 13, 1965 – January 11, 1967

Personal details
- Born: 1896 or 1897 Epworth, Iowa, U.S.
- Died: September 24, 1992 (aged 95) Chicago, Illinois, U.S.
- Party: Republican

George F. Sisler (1896 or 1897 – September 24, 1992) was an American politician and businessman.

== Early life and career ==
Sisler was born on a farm in Epworth, Iowa.

Sisler received an undergraduate degree from the University of Dubuque. In 1921, he received a Master of Arts degree from the University of Chicago; he later received a divinity degree from there as well.

In his early career, Sisler worked as a railroad conductor, before serving as a private in World War I. After the war, he was a teacher at Lake Forest Academy. In the 1930s, he began working at First National Bank, where he stayed until the 1960s. He then started Sisler & Krebs, a consulting firm, where he worked until his retirement in 1989.

== Political career ==
Sisler was elected as a "blue ribbon" Republican candidate in the 1964 Illinois House of Representatives election, which was held at-large. Sisler was endorsed in that election by the Independent Voters of Illinois, who later rated him as one of the best freshman legislators elected that year.

In the House, Sisler backed a pay raise for legislators, which intended to raise yearly salaries from $6,000 to $9,000, arguing that legislators were not paid adequately compared to what businessmen would be paid for doing a similarly important job.

Sisler ran for the 12th district of the Illinois Senate in 1966. He was unopposed in the Republican primary, but was defeated in the general election by Democratic incumbent Joseph L. DeLaCour.

Sisler ran for City Treasurer of Chicago in 1967. He was the Cook County Republican Party's preferred candidate, defeating Daniel M. Dumo by a wide margin for the party's nomination in the February 28 primary election. He faced Democratic candidate Marshall Korshak. The Chicago Tribune made no endorsement in the race, stating that both candidates were qualified. Sisler lost the general election to Korshak by a wide margin; however, he outperformed John L. Waner, the Republican nominee in the concurrent mayoral election.

== Personal life ==
Sisler served as the president of various organizations, including the Church Federation of Greater Chicago and the Rotary Club of Chicago.

Sisler was the cousin of George H. Sisler, a first baseman who played primarily for the St. Louis Browns.

Sisler died on September 24, 1992 in Chicago at the age of 95.

== Electoral history ==
1966 Illinois's 12th Senate district Republican primary election
Party	Candidate	Votes	%
Republican	George F. Sisler	5,379	100.0
Total votes		5,379	100.0

1966 Illinois's 12th Senate district election
Party	Candidate	Votes	%
Democratic	Joseph L. DeLaCour (incumbent)	28,256	53.40
Republican	George F. Sisler	24,653	46.60
Total votes		52,909	100.0

1967 Chicago City Treasurer Republican primary election
Party	Candidate	Votes	%
Republican	George F. Sisler	61,407	85.74
Republican	Daniel M. Dumo	10,215	14.26
Total votes		71,622	100.0

1967 Chicago City Treasurer election
Party	Candidate	Votes	%
Democratic	Marshall Korshak	776,282	73.59
Republican	George F. Sisler	278,579	26.41
Total votes		1,054,861	100.0
