= Meade Baltz =

American businessman and politician

Paul Meade Baltz (January 29, 1912 – March 1, 1994) was an American businessman and politician.

Born in Troy Township, Will County, Illinois, Meade went to the public schools in Joliet, Illinois. He owned a retail paint and wallpaper business in Joliet, Illinois. He served as a township supervisor for Joliet Township. Baltz served on the Will County Board from 1951 to 1960 and was chairman of the county board. He served in the Illinois House of Representatives from 1961 to 1964 and was a Republican. Baltz then served in the Illinois Senate from 1966 to 1972. He died at St. Joseph Medical Center in Joliet, Illinois.
