= Robert Craig (Illinois politician) =

American politician (1921–2000)

Member of the Illinois House of Representatives

Personal details
- Born: October 28, 1921 Oakwood, Illinois, U.S.
- Died: September 20, 2000 (aged 78)
- Party: Democratic

Robert William Craig (October 28, 1921 – September 20, 2000) was an American politician who served as a member of the Illinois House of Representatives. Craig died on September 20, 2000, at the age of 78.
