= John Touhy =

American politician (1919–1983)

John P. Touhy
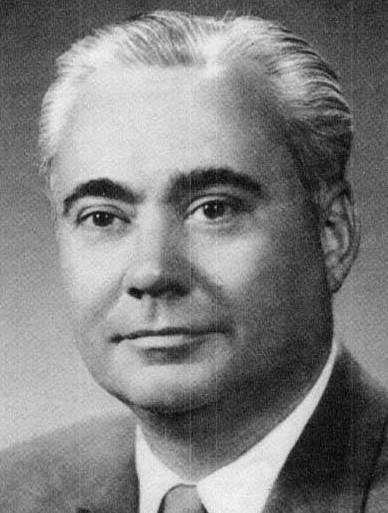
- John P. Touhy, Speaker of the Illinois House of Representatives (c. 1966)

Speaker of the Illinois House of Representatives
- In office January 6, 1965 – January 4, 1967
- Preceded by: John W. Lewis Jr.
- Succeeded by: Ralph T. Smith

Personal details
- Born: April 19, 1919 Chicago, Illinois, U.S.
- Died: September 28, 1983 (aged 64) Chicago, Illinois, U.S.
- Party: Democratic
- Education: Georgetown University (BA)

John P. Touhy (April 19, 1919 – September 28, 1983) was an American politician.

Born in Chicago, Illinois, Touhy went to Campion High School in Prairie du Chien, Wisconsin and received his bachelor's degree from Georgetown University. He then served in the United States Army during World War II. Touhy then studied law at DePaul University College of Law and was a sales representative for McKay Construction Company in Bensenville, Illinois. From 1949 until 1971, Touhy served in the Illinois House of Representatives and served as speaker of the house in 1965. Touhy was involved with the Democratic Party.
