= Melvin McNairy =

American politician (1908–1975)

Member of the Illinois House of Representatives

Personal details
- Born: October 22, 1908 St. Louis, Missouri, U.S.
- Died: January 1975 (aged 66) Chicago, Illinois, U.S.
- Party: Democratic

Melvin McNairy (October 22, 1908 – January 1975) was an American politician who served as a member of the Illinois House of Representatives. He was born in St. Louis, Missouri on October 22, 1908, and died in Chicago in January 1975, at the age of 66.
