= Michael E. Hannigan =

American politician

Member of the Illinois House of Representatives

Personal details
- Born: Chicago, Illinois
- Party: Democratic

Michael E. Hannigan was an American politician who served as a member of the Illinois House of Representatives.
