= Louis Janczak =

American politician

Member of the Illinois House of Representatives

Personal details
- Born: August 25, 1896 Chicago, Illinois
- Party: Republican

Louis Janczak was an American politician who served as a member of the Illinois House of Representatives.
