= James D. Carrigan =

American politician

Member of the Illinois House of Representatives
- In office 1947–1971

Personal details
- Born: March 15, 1905 Peoria, Illinois
- Died: 1979 (aged 73–74)
- Party: Democratic

James D. Carrigan (March 15, 1905 – 1979) was an American politician who served as a member of the Illinois House of Representatives from 1947 to 1971.
