= Dan Teefey =

American politician (1923–1976)

Member of the Illinois House of Representatives
- In office 1961–1967
- Constituency: 50th district (1961–1965) at-large (1965–1967)

Personal details
- Born: November 14, 1923 Mount Sterling, Illinois, U.S.
- Died: August 29, 1976 (aged 52) Mount Sterling, Illinois, U.S.
- Party: Democratic

Dan Teefey (November 14, 1923 – August 29, 1976) was an American politician who served as a member of the Illinois House of Representatives. He died at the age of 52 in Mount Sterling, Illinois, on August 29, 1976.
