= Raymond J. Welsh Jr. =

American politician

Member of the Illinois House of Representatives

Personal details
- Born: 1918 Chicago, Illinois
- Party: Democratic

Raymond J. Welsh Jr. was an American politician who served as a member of the Illinois House of Representatives.
