= Fred J. Schraeder =

American politician and businessman (1923-2016)

Member of the Illinois House of Representatives

Personal details
- Party: Democratic

Fred J. Schraeder (December 26, 1923 – September 28, 2016) was an American politician and businessman who served as a Democratic member of the Illinois House of Representatives.

== Biography ==
Schraeder was born in Clifton, Illinois and raised in Peoria, Illinois. He served in thee United States Army during World War II. Schraeder lived in Peoria with his wife and family.

Schraeder was an active member of the Democratic Party serving as a precinct committeeman and chairman of the local Democratic Party in Peoria County. He was also involved with the labor union movement, as an employee of Pabst Brewing Company, serving as business representative for Brewery Workers Local Union No. 77, an executive board member and chairman of the Illinois ICU-CIO, and as president of the Illinois Brewery Workers Council.

Schraeder served in the Illinois House of Representatives in 1965 and 1966, from 1973 to 1977, and from 1979 to 1983. Schraeder was a Democrat. Schreader died at St. John's Hospital in Springfield, Illinois.
