= Robert V. Walsh =

American politician

Member of the Illinois House of Representatives

Personal details
- Born: Grayville, Illinois
- Party: Democratic

Robert V. Walsh was an American politician who served as a member of the Illinois House of Representatives.
