= Leo Pfeffer (politician) =

American politician

Member of the Illinois House of Representatives

Personal details
- Born: November 26, 1908 Seymour, Illinois
- Party: Democratic

Leo Pfeffer was an American politician who served as a member of the Illinois House of Representatives.
