= G. William Horsley =

American politician (1910–1996)

Member of the Illinois House of Representatives

Personal details
- Born: July 15, 1910 Creal Springs, Illinois, U.S.
- Died: July 14, 1996 (aged 85)
- Party: Republican

George William Horsley (July 15, 1910 – July 14, 1996) was an American politician who served as a member of the Illinois House of Representatives. Horsley died on July 14, 1996, one day before his 86th birthday.
