= John Jerome Hill =

American machinist and politician

Mayor of Aurora, Illinois
- In office 1977–1985

Member of the Illinois House of Representatives
- In office 1959–1977

Personal details
- Born: October 27, 1918 Aurora, Illinois, U.S.
- Died: June 13, 1986 (aged 67) Aurora, Illinois, U.S.
- Party: Democratic
- Education: Marmion Academy; St. Ambrose University
- Occupation: Politician, machinist

Military service
- Allegiance: United States
- Branch/service: United States Army
- Battles/wars: World War II

John Jerome Hill (October 27, 1918 – June 13, 1986) was an American machinist and politician.

Hill was born in Aurora, Illinois. He graduated from Marmion Academy and went to St. Ambrose University. Hill served in the United States Army during World War II. Hill was a machinist, who worked in a factory in Aurora, and was involved with the United Steel Worker union. Hill served on the Aurora City Council and was a Democrat. He served in the Illinois House of Representatives from 1959 until 1977. Hill then served as Mayor of Aurora from 1977 until 1985. Hill died at his home in Aurora, Illinois.
