= Leo B. Obernuefemann =

American politician (1927–1974)

Member of the Illinois House of Representatives

Personal details
- Born: November 28, 1927 O'Fallon, Illinois, U.S.
- Died: May 10, 1974 (aged 46)
- Party: Democratic

Leo B. Obernuefemann (November 28, 1927 – May 10, 1974) was an American politician who served as a member of the Illinois House of Representatives.
