= James P. Loukas =

American politician (1916–1976)

Member of the Illinois House of Representatives

Personal details
- Born: December 25, 1916 Chicago, Illinois, U.S.
- Died: July 6, 1976 (aged 59)
- Party: Democratic

James Peter Loukas (December 25, 1916 – July 6, 1976) was an American politician who served as a member of the Illinois House of Representatives. Loukas was born in Chicago on December 25, 1916, and died on July 6, 1976, at the age of 59.
