= Stanley A. Papierz =

American politician (1918–1983)

Member of the Illinois House of Representatives

Personal details
- Born: January 28, 1918 Chicago, Illinois, U.S.
- Died: July 6, 1983 (aged 65)
- Party: Republican

Stanley Andrew Papierz (January 28, 1918 – July 6, 1983) was an American politician who served as a member of the Illinois House of Representatives. Papierz died on July 6, 1983, at the age of 65.
