= Nick Svalina =

American politician (1910–??)

Member of the Illinois House of Representatives

Personal details
- Born: October 16, 1910 Chicago, Illinois, U.S.
- Party: Democratic

Nick Svalina was an American politician who served as a member of the Illinois House of Representatives.
