= Edward J. Shaw =

American politician

Member of the Illinois House of Representatives

Personal details
- Born: Chicago, Illinois
- Party: Democratic

Edward J. Shaw was an American politician who served as a member of the Illinois House of Representatives.
