= Chester P. Majewski =

American politician (1928–1983)

Member of the Illinois House of Representatives

Personal details
- Party: Democratic

Chester P. Majewski (1928–1983) was an American politician who served as a Democratic member of the Illinois House of Representatives and a Commissioner of the Metropolitan Water Reclamation District of Greater Chicago.

== Biographical sketch ==
Majewski was born March 9, 1928, in Chicago. He attended high school at Steinmetz High School. He earned a Bachelor of Science from Northwestern University in 1952 and a Juris Doctor from Northwestern University Law School in 1956. He served overseas in the United States Army in the Far East Command's 25th Infantry Division. He reached the rank of sergeant. During his legal career, he was assistant corporation counsel for the City of Chicago and an assistant public defender for Cook County, Illinois, including in Appeals Division. He was elected as one of 118 at-large members to the Illinois House of Representatives. He was a member of the Committees on Education, Insurance and Revenue. He was elected to the board of commissioners of the Metropolitan Water Reclamation District of Greater Chicago in 1968 and re-elected in 1974 and 1980. He died July 9, 1983.
