= Michael H. McDermott =

American politician

Member of the Illinois House of Representatives

Personal details
- Born: June 30, 1901 Chicago, Illinois
- Party: Democratic

Michael H. McDermott was an American politician who served as a member of the Illinois House of Representatives.
