= William Pierce (Illinois politician) =

American politician

Member of the Illinois House of Representatives

Personal details
- Born: January 28, 1898 Chicago, Illinois
- Party: Democratic

William Pierce was an American politician who served as a member of the Illinois House of Representatives.
