= Butch Ratcliffe =

American politician

Member of the Illinois House of Representatives

Personal details
- Born: Beardstown, Illinois, U.S.
- Party: Democratic

C. R. "Butch" Ratcliffe was an American politician who served as a member of the Illinois House of Representatives.
