= Edward W. Wolbank =

American politician

Member of the Illinois House of Representatives

Personal details
- Born: 14 April 1913 New York City, New York
- Party: Democratic

Edward W. Wolbank was an American politician who served as a member of the Illinois House of Representatives.
