= John D'Arco Sr. =

Italian-born American politician

John D'Arco

Chicago alderman from the 1st ward
- In office 1952–1963

Member of the Illinois House of Representatives
- In office 1945–1952

Chicago, Illinois First Ward Democratic Committeeman
- In office 1952–1992

Personal details
- Born: March 27, 1912 Chicago, Illinois, US
- Died: October 27, 1994 (aged 82) Chicago, Illinois, US
- Party: Democratic
- Children: John A. D'Arco Jr.

John D'Arco Sr. (March 27, 1912 – October 27, 1994) was an American politician, who was involved in organized political corruption, illegal gambling and prostitution activities in Chicago, Illinois, US.

== Early life ==
D'Arco was born in Chicago, Illinois, on March 27, 1912 to parents of Italian ancestry. Growing up in the Near West Side, he allegedly developed connections with street gangs in Chicago's Little Italy, during the 1920s.

== Rise to power and politics ==
By 1951, D'Arco had already become a powerful Democratic ward boss of the 1st Ward and, in 1945, he was a Democratic Committeeman, as well. He also served in the Illinois House of Representatives from 1945 to 1952 as a Democrat. He was known for providing protection to the Chicago criminal gangs, including the Chicago Outfit, and participating in a variety of criminal activities, ranging from organized corruption of city officials to prostitution.

== Later years, investigations, and death ==
During the 1970s, D'Arco was investigated by the US federal government for his alleged involvement in an attempt to fix the 1977 murder trial of reputed hitman Harry Aleman, but he was never indicted. D'Arco died in Chicago, Illinois.

== See also ==
- John A. D'Arco Jr., D'Arco's son, also a prominent Illinois politician
