= Alan R. Johnston =

American politician (1914–1999)

Member of the Illinois House of Representatives

Personal details
- Born: April 21, 1914 Chicago, Illinois, U.S.
- Died: December 24, 1999 (aged 85) Vero Beach, Florida, U.S.
- Party: Republican

Alan Rogers Johnston (April 21, 1914 – December 24, 1999) was an American politician who served as a member of the Illinois House of Representatives. Johnston died in Vero Beach, Florida on December 24, 1999, at the age of 85.
