= Arthur E. Simmons (politician) =

American politician

Member of the Illinois House of Representatives

Personal details
- Born: January 25, 1905 Lake County, Illinois
- Died: August 1, 1986 (aged 81) Clearwater, Florida
- Party: Republican

Arthur E. Simmons was an American politician who served as a member of the Illinois House of Representatives.

Simmons served as mayor of Skokie, Illinois, and represented Niles and Maine Township in the legislature for 16 years. As of 1965, he was serving his fifth term.

He died in Clearwater, Florida, at the age of eighty one. Simmons and his wife, Elizabeth, had one son and one daughter.
