= William J. Schoeninger =

American politician

Member of the Illinois House of Representatives

Personal details
- Born: December 13, 1898 Chicago, Illinois
- Party: Democratic

William J. Schoeninger was an American politician who served as a member of the Illinois House of Representatives.
