= Peter J. Whalen =

American politician

Member of the Illinois House of Representatives

Personal details
- Born: September 20, 1898 Chicago, Illinois
- Party: Democratic

Peter J. Whalen was an American politician who served as a member of the Illinois House of Representatives.
