= Howard R. Slater =

American politician

Member of the Illinois House of Representatives

Personal details
- Party: Democratic

Howard R. Slater (July 12, 1917 – September 6, 1987) was an American lawyer and politician.

Slater was born in Brooklyn, in New York City, New York. He graduated from Boy High School in Brooklyn and received his law degree from Columbia Law School. Slater also went to the Northwestern University. Slater worked in the United States Department of Agriculture in the Surplus Marketing Administration. He then served in the United States Army during World War II and was commissioned a lieutenant in the transportation corps. Slater lived in Highland Park, Illinois, with his wife and family and practiced law in Chicago, Illinois. He served in the Illinois House of Representatives in 1965 and 1966 and was a Democrat. He died at the Rush-Presbyterian-St. Luke's Medical Center in Chicago, Illinois.
