= Omer Sanders =

American politician

Member of the Illinois House of Representatives

Personal details
- Born: January 4, 1906 Marion, Illinois
- Party: Democratic

Omer Sanders was an American politician who served as a member of the Illinois House of Representatives.
