= Henry M. Lenard =

American politician

Member of the Illinois House of Representatives

Personal details
- Party: Democratic

Henry Madart Lenard (September 23, 1903 – January 23, 1983) was an American politician.

Lenard was born in Chicago, Illinois. He graduated Tilden Technical High School. Lenard served as chief bailiff for the City of Chicago. He served in the Illinois House of Representatives from 1953 to 1972 and was a Democrat. He died at his home in Chicago, Illinois in the Riverdale, Chicago neighborhood.
