= Lawrence DiPrima =

American politician

Member of the Illinois House of Representatives

Personal details
- Party: Democratic

Lawrence DiPrima (June 24, 1910 – May 24, 1991) was an American politician.

Born in Chicago, Illinois, DiPrima served in the United States Army. He went to the Carnegie Institute and was a city maintenance inspector. DiPrima served in the Illinois House of Representatives from 1963 to 1985. During the United States 1984 Election, DiPrima served as the chairman of the Illinois Democrats for the Reagan-Bush Committee. DiPrima died at Our Lady of the Resurrection Medical Center in Chicago, Illinois after heart surgery.

== Army service ==
He joined the United States Army in July 1942 at Camp Grant, Illinois and conducted his training at Camp Atterbury, Indiana and Camp Breckinridge, Kentucky. He served as a combat medic for C Company, 308th Medical Battalion, 331st Infantry Regiment, 83rd Infantry Division in the European Theater of Operations of World War II. He went to England and then on June 17, 1944, he went to France. He was awarded the Bronze Star Medal. He was discharged in July 1945 as a corporal.
