= Joseph Tumpach =

American politician (1912-1968)

Member of the Illinois House of Representatives

Personal details
- Party: Democratic

Joseph Tumpach (December 7, 1912 – October 20, 1968) was an American businessman and politician.

Born in Baltimore, Maryland, Tumpach was a businessman and owned a motel. He was also involved with the Congress of Industrial Organizations (CIO) and was chairman of the DuPage County, Illinois Democratic Party. Tumpach lived in Downers Grove, Illinois. From 1965 until his death in 1968, he served in the Illinois House of Representatives. Tumpach and his wife Cecelia were killed in an automobile accident in Westmont, Illinois, as they were leaving a dinner for Tumpach at a union hall. Tumpach was seeking a third term in the Illinois General Assembly.
