= LaSalle J. DeMichaels =

American politician

Member of the Illinois House of Representatives

Personal details
- Born: October 12, 1900 London, England
- Party: Democratic

LaSalle J. DeMichaels (October 12, 1900 - ) was an American politician who served as a member of the Illinois House of Representatives.
