= Marshall Korshak =

American lawyer and politician

Morris Jerome "Marshall" Korshak (February 6, 1910 – January 19, 1996) was an American lawyer and politician who served as a Democratic member of the Illinois Senate.

== Early life ==
Marshall Korshak was born in Chicago, Illinois on February 6, 1910. His brother was Sidney Korshak. He was raised in the then-predominantly Jewish Lawndale area and graduated from Marshall Metropolitan High School. He then went to University of Wisconsin and received his law degree from Chicago-Kent College of Law. He was admitted to the Illinois bar. He served as the Secretary to Cook County Treasurers Robert Sweitzer and later Joseph L. Gill from 1934 to 1939. He then moved to the Civil Department of the Cook County State's Attorney's office and served there from 1939 to 1947. He then entered private practice.

== Illinois Senate ==
Korshak served in the Illinois Senate from 1951 to 1963 and was a Democrat. During his first term in the Senate, he was assigned the following committees: Education; Industrial Affairs; Judiciary; and Municipalities. He also served as a member of the Illinois Public Aid Commission and the Commission on Sex Offenders.

== Post-legislative career ==
He then served as a trustee for the Chicago Metropolitan Samitary District and as director of the Illinois Revenue Department. In 1967, Korshak was elected City Treasurer of Chicago on Mayor Richard J. Daley's slate. As Korshak could not succeed himself as Treasurer, Daley slated Joseph G. Bertand and Bertrand was elected as Korshak's successor.

While holding various elected and appointed offices, Korshak also served for many years as Democratic Committeeman of the 5th Ward of Chicago. Korshak died in a hospital in Chicago, Illinois.
