= Joseph Burke (judge) =

American judge

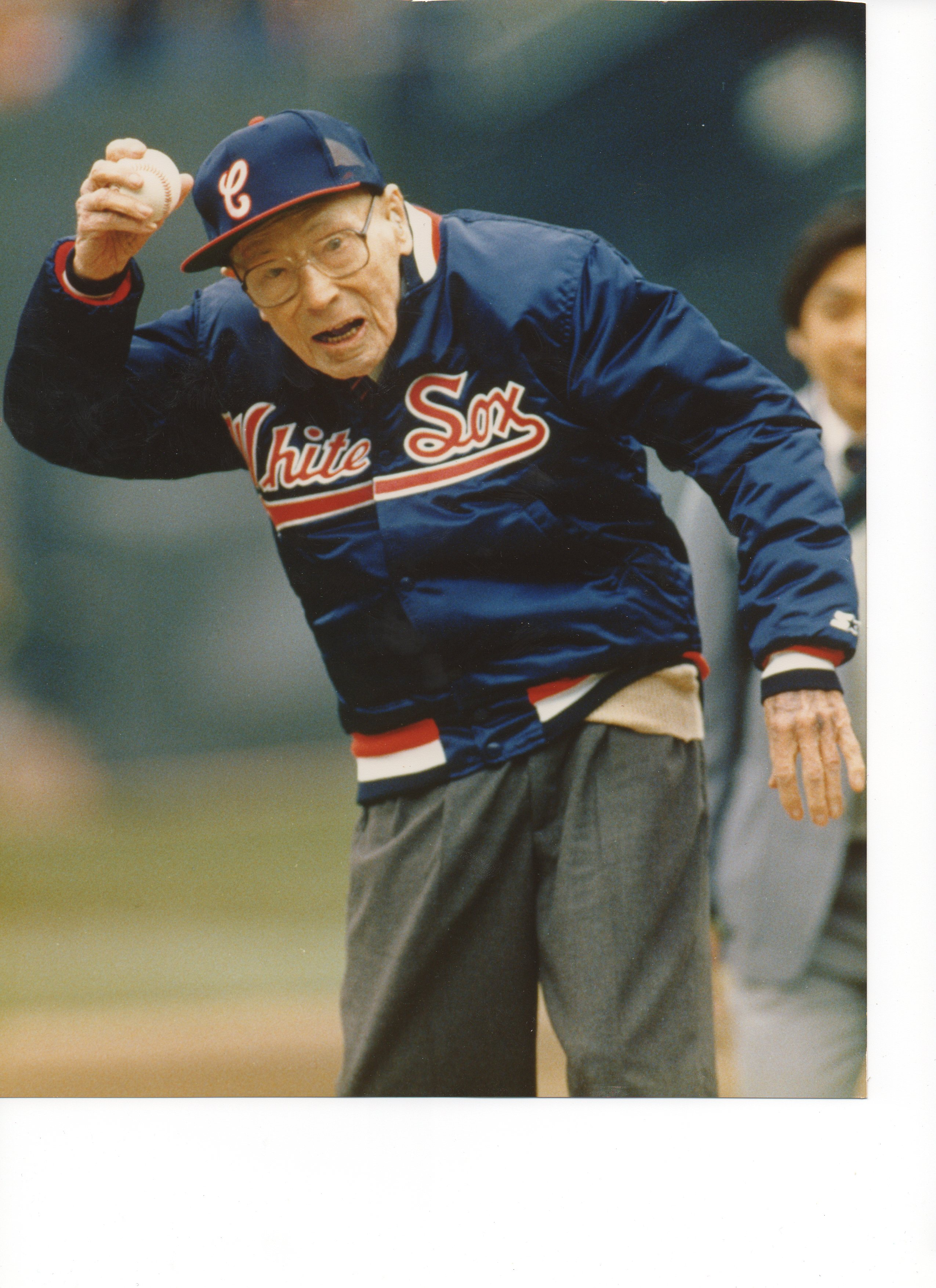
- Burke on Opening Day in 1988
- Born: Joseph Burke; March 2, 1888; Claremorris, County Mayo, Ireland
- Died: January 31, 1990 (aged 101); Chicago, Illinois, U.S.
- Occupation: Judge

Joseph Burke (March 2, 1888 – January 31, 1990) was the longest-tenured judge in the history of the Illinois Appellate Court.

Judge Burke was born in Claremorris, County Mayo, Ireland in 1888, son of Patrick Burke. His family emigrated to America in 1895, going through Ellis Island and then on to Chicago where they settled on the Near West Side.

Burke worked as a newsboy, selling the Chicago Daily News for eight years. He graduated from DePaul Law School in 1909 and began practicing law in 1911.

In 1917 he enlisted in the United States Army.

After the war, he organized the American Legion's Blackhawk Post and was its first commander.

Burke was elected to the municipal court in 1922. In 1930 he was appointed a circuit judge, and was permanently assigned to the Illinois Appellate Court in 1939.

He served on the Appellate Court until 1976, retiring as chief justice for the 1st District Appellate Court.

His last public appearance was in April 1988 at age one hundred when he threw out the first pitch at the Chicago White Sox game on Opening Day. Joseph was a lifelong fan of the White Sox.

He and his spouse Catherine Ryan Burke had five children named Edmund, Francis, Richard, Jerome and Shirley.

He had 18 grandchildren and 13 great-grandchildren when he died.
