= Edward F. Sensor =

American politician

Member of the Illinois House of Representatives

Personal details
- Born: Cary, Illinois
- Party: Democratic

Edward F. Sensor was an American politician who served as a member of the Illinois House of Representatives.
