= Dean McCully =

American politician

Member of the Illinois House of Representatives

Personal details
- Born: 1907 Marshall County, Illinois
- Party: Republican

Dean McCully was an American politician who served as a member of the Illinois House of Representatives.
