= Roy Curtis Small =

American politician

Member of the Illinois House of Representatives
- In office 1965–1967
- Constituency: at-large

Personal details
- Born: June 12, 1932 Harrisburg, Illinois, U.S.
- Died: February 21, 2012 (aged 79) Cambridge, Maryland, U.S.
- Party: Democratic

Roy Curtis Small (June 12, 1932 – February 21, 2012) was an American politician who served as a member of the Illinois House of Representatives from 1965 to 1967. A reporter and photographer, he served as general manager of The Daily Register in Harrisburg from 1980 to 1988. He died at the age of 79 on February 21, 2012, in Cambridge, Maryland.
