= Joseph R. Hale =

American politician

Member of the Illinois House of Representatives
- In office 1963–1965
- Constituency: 59th district

Personal details
- Born: June 12, 1927 Ridgway, Illinois, U.S.
- Died: November 29, 1993 (aged 66) Shawneetown, Illinois, U.S.
- Party: Republican

Joseph Robert Hale (June 12, 1927 – November 29, 1993) was an American politician who served as a member of the Illinois House of Representatives from 1963 to 1965. An attorney, he served as judge of Gallatin County, Illinois, from 1955 to 1967, and he was an elector in the 1976 and 1980 electoral colleges. He died at the age of 66 at his home in Shawneetown, Illinois, on November 29, 1993.
