= Lewis V. Morgan =

American lawyer, judge, and politician (1929–2018)

Member of the Illinois House of Representatives

Personal details
- Born: December 17, 1929 Elmhurst, Illinois, U.S.
- Died: October 4, 2018 (aged 88) Wheaton, Illinois, U.S.
- Party: Republican

Lewis V. Morgan, Jr. (December 17, 1929 – October 4, 2018) was an American lawyer, judge, and politician.

Morgan was born in Elmhurst, Illinois. He lived with his family in Wheaton, Illinois and graduated from Wheaton High School. He served in the United States Army and was stationed in Germany. Morgan received his bachelor's degree from DePauw University in 1951 and his J.D. degree from the University of Chicago Law School in 1954. Morgan was admitted to the Illinois bar and practiced law in Wheaton, Illinois. Morgan served in the Illinois House of Representatives from 1963 to 1970 and was a Republican. Morgan then served as an Illinois associate judge and as an Illinois circuit judge from 1975 to 1986. His wife, Linda, was nearly a victim of the 1982 Chicago Tylenol murders after she purchased a cyanide-laced package of Tylenol, but did not consume any of the pills. Morgan died in Wheaton, Illinois.
