= Harold D. Stedelin =

American politician

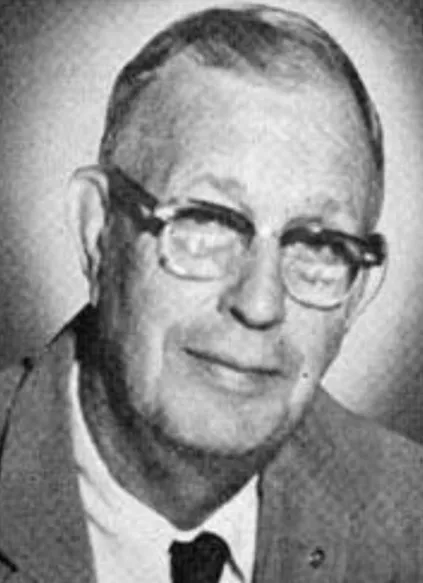
- Stedelin in the 1960s

Member of the Illinois House of Representatives
- In office 1965–1975

Personal details
- Born: November 8, 1902 Sparta, Illinois, U.S.
- Died: May 2, 1981 (aged 78)
- Party: Democratic

Harold D. Stedelin (November 8, 1902 – May 2, 1981) was an American politician. He served as a Democratic member of the Illinois House of Representatives.

== Life and career ==
Stedelin was born in Sparta, Illinois.

Stedelin served in the Illinois House of Representatives from 1965 to 1975.

Stedelin died on May 2, 1981, at the age of 78.
