= William A. Moore (Illinois politician) =

American politician

Member of the Illinois House of Representatives

Personal details
- Party: Democratic

William A. Moore was an American politician who served as a member of the Illinois House of Representatives.
