= Raymond J. Kahoun =

American politician

Member of the Illinois House of Representatives from the 26th district

Personal details
- Born: December 28, 1936 Chicago, Illinois, U.S.

Raymond J. Kahoun (December 28, 1936 – June 13, 2025) was an American politician who served as a member of the Illinois House of Representatives.
