= Leo F. O'Brien =

American lawyer and politician

Member of the Illinois House of Representatives

Personal details
- Party: Democratic

Leo F. O'Brien (June 26, 1924 – March 21, 1968) was an American lawyer and politician.

O'Brien was born in Galesburg, Illinois. He went to Corpus Christi High School and to Knox College. O'Brien also went to Nancy-Université and University of Connecticut. O'Brien served in the United States Army during World War II and was commissioned a sergeant. In 1950, O'Brien received his law degree from University of Illinois College of Law. He served as an Illinois Assistant Attorney General for eight years. O'Brien served in the Illinois House of Representatives from 1965 until his death in 1968 and was a Democrat. O'Brien died in an automobile accident while driving in Galesburg, Illinois on U.S. Route 150.
