= William E. Pollack =

American politician

Member of the Illinois House of Representatives

Personal details
- Born: December 2, 1908 Chicago, Illinois
- Party: Republican

William E. Pollack was an American politician who served as a member of the Illinois House of Representatives.
