= William A. Giblin =

American politician

Member of the Illinois House of Representatives

Personal details
- Born: Utica, Illinois
- Party: Democratic

William A. Giblin was an American politician who served as a member of the Illinois House of Representatives.
