= Frank J. Broucek =

American politician

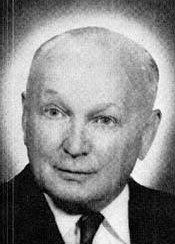

Member of the Illinois House of Representatives

Personal details
- Born: October 8, 1896 Chicago, Illinois
- Died: July 24, 1972 (age 75) Maywood, Illinois
- Party: Democratic

Frank J. Broucek (October 8, 1896 – July 24, 1972) was an American politician who served as a member of the Illinois House of Representatives.

== Biography ==
He died at the hospital on July 24, 1972 in Maywood, Illinois.
