= Noble W. Lee =

American politician

Member of the Illinois House of Representatives
- Incumbent
- Assumed office 1941 - 1969

Personal details
- Born: August 27, 1898 Buffalo, New York
- Died: October 8, 1978 (aged 80) Chicago, Illinois
- Party: Republican
- Education: Harvard College (BA); John Marshall Law School (LLB)

Noble W. Lee was an American politician who served as a member of the Illinois House of Representatives.
