= Ed Lehman =

American politician

Member of the Illinois House of Representatives

Personal details
- Born: March 1, 1907 East Saint Louis, Illinois
- Party: Republican

Ed Lehman was an American politician who served as a member of the Illinois House of Representatives.
