= Edwin E. Dale =

American politician

Member of the Illinois House of Representatives

Personal details
- Born: August 9, 1918 McLeansboro, Illinois
- Died: August 12, 2004 (aged 86)
- Party: Republican

Edwin E. Dale (August 9, 1918 - August 12, 2004) was an American politician who served as a member of the Illinois House of Representatives.

He died in Johnson City, Tennessee in 2004.
