= Francis X. Mahoney =

American politician

Member of the Illinois House of Representatives from the at-large district
- In office 1965–1967

Personal details
- Party: Democratic

Francis X. "F.X." Mahoney (March 21, 1922 – February 3, 2017) was an American politician who served as a Democratic member of the Illinois House of Representatives and a Judge of the Illinois Circuit Court.

Mahoney was born in 1922 in Peabody, Massachusetts. He earned an A.B. degree from Boston College in 1943. During World War II he served in the United States Navy's amphibious forces. He received his juris doctor from Northwestern University School of Law in 1946. He was a partner in the Law Firm of Nettles and Mahoney, engaged in the general practice of law in Freeport, Illinois. He practiced law in Illinois and Wisconsin. He was an active member of the Democratic Party in Stephenson County, Illinois. He was elected to the Illinois House of Representatives in 1964 as one of 177 members elected statewide. He served a single term during the 74th Illinois General Assembly He served for a time as the member of the Illinois Democratic Central Committee from what was then Illinois's 16th congressional district. In 1978, Mahoney was elected a judge of the 15th Circuit Court, which included Jo Daviess, Carroll, Ogle, Lee, and Stephenson counties, a rare feat for a Democratic candidate. Mahoney served as a circuit judge until his retirement effective August 3, 1991. Eric S. DeMar of Galena, Illinois was appointed to the Mahoney vacancy. Mahoney died February 3, 2017.
