= Andrew A. Euzzino =

American politician

Member of the Illinois House of Representatives

Personal details
- Born: New York City
- Party: Democratic

Andrew A. Euzzino was an American politician who served as a member of the Illinois House of Representatives.
