= Peter M. Callan =

American politician

Peter Callan

Member of the Illinois House of Representatives
- In office 1959 – January 9, 1965

Personal details
- Born: January 17, 1894 Chicago, Illinois
- Died: January 9, 1965 (aged 70) Chicago, Illinois
- Party: Democratic
- Education: Loyola University Chicago

Peter M. Callan (January 17, 1894 – January 9, 1965) was an American politician who served as a member of the Illinois House of Representatives from 1959 to 1965.

== Early life and education ==
Born in Chicago, Illinois, Callan went to Holy Family School, St. Ignatius College Prep, and Loyola University Chicago.

== Career ==
Callan worked for the Commonwealth Edison Company and the LaSalle Extension University. He was the chief clerk for the Cook County Highway Department. He was involved with the Democratic Party. Callan served in the Illinois House of Representatives from 1959 until his death in 1965.

== Personal life ==
Callan died at St. Anne's Hospital, in Chicago, Illinois, from a heart ailment.
