= Bernard McDevitt =

American politician

Member of the Illinois House of Representatives

Personal details
- Born: July 24, 1902 Chicago, Illinois
- Party: Republican

Bernard McDevitt was an American politician who served as a member of the Illinois House of Representatives.
