= John W. Lewis Jr. =

American politician (1905–1977)

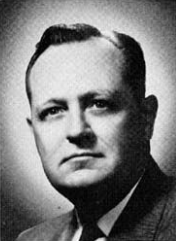
- Lewis in 1965

32nd Secretary of State of Illinois
- In office 1970–1973
- Governor: Richard B. Ogilvie
- Preceded by: Paul Powell
- Succeeded by: Michael Howlett

59th Speaker of the Illinois House of Representatives
- In office January 9, 1963 – January 6, 1965
- Preceded by: Paul Powell
- Succeeded by: John Touhy

Personal details
- Born: September 6, 1905 Marshall, Illinois, U.S.
- Died: August 12, 1977 (aged 71)
- Education: University of Illinois

John W. Lewis Jr. (September 6, 1905 – August 12, 1977) was an American politician.

Born in Marshall, Illinois, Lewis graduated from Marshall Township High School and then went to University of Illinois. He was a farmer auctioneer, and livestock dealer. He served in the Illinois House of Representatives from 1940 until 1958 and was a Republican. In 1958, he was then elected to the Illinois State Senate. However, in 1962 Lewis was again elected to the Illinois House of Representatives and served until 1968 and served as speaker. Lewis was appointed director of the Illinois Department of Agriculture in 1969. In 1970, he was appointed Illinois Secretary of State and served until 1973.

He unsuccessfully sought the Republican nomination for United States Senator in 1960.

== Notes ==
Political offices
Preceded by Paul Powell	Secretary of State of Illinois; 1970–1973	Succeeded by Michael Howlett
