= J. David Jones =

American politician (1912–1980)

Member of the Illinois House of Representatives

Personal details
- Born: January 3, 1912 Springfield, Illinois, U.S.
- Died: October 2, 1980 (aged 68)
- Party: Republican

John David Jones (January 3, 1912 – October 2, 1980) was an American politician who served as a member of the Illinois House of Representatives. He died on October 2, 1980, at the age of 68.
