= Leslie N. Jones =

American politician (born 1898)

Member of the Illinois House of Representatives

Personal details
- Born: June 1, 1898 Flora, Illinois
- Party: Republican

Leslie N. Jones was an American politician who served as a member of the Illinois House of Representatives.
