= Dorah Grow =

American politician

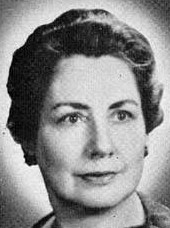

Member of the Illinois House of Representatives

Personal details
- Born: Oklahoma
- Party: Democratic

Dorah Grow was an American politician who served as a member of the Illinois House of Representatives.
