= John H. Kleine =

American politician (1911–1993)

Member of the Illinois House of Representatives

Personal details
- Born: November 28, 1911 Chicago, Illinois, U.S.
- Died: October 6, 1993 (aged 81) Chicago, Illinois, U.S.
- Party: Republican

John Henry Kleine (November 28, 1911 – October 6, 1993) was an American politician who served as a member of the Illinois House of Representatives. Kleine died in Chicago on October 6, 1993, at the age of 81.
