= Chester R. Wiktorski Jr. =

American politician

Member of the Illinois House of Representatives
- In office 1957–1969
- Constituency: 15th district (1957–1965, 1967–1969) at-large (1965–1967)

Personal details
- Born: May 14, 1934 Chicago, Illinois, U.S.
- Died: February 18, 2005 (aged 70)
- Party: Democratic

Chester R. Wiktorski Jr. (May 14, 1934 – February 18, 2005) was an American politician who served as a Democratic member of the Illinois House of Representatives from 1957 to 1969. He died at the age of 70 on February 18, 2005.
