= Frank C. Wolf =

American politician

Member of the Illinois House of Representatives

Personal details
- Born: Chicago, Illinois
- Party: Democratic

Frank C. Wolf was an American politician who served as a member of the Illinois House of Representatives.
