= Joseph T. Connelly =

American politician

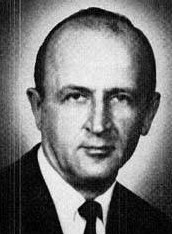

Member of the Illinois House of Representatives
- Incumbent
- Assumed office 1965

Personal details
- Born: 1924/1926 Marshall, Illinois
- Party: Democratic

Joseph T. Connelly (born 1925/1926) was an American politician who served as a member of the Illinois House of Representatives.

== Biography ==
Connelley served as an alderman in Urbana, Illinois from 1954 to 1958 after which he worked as an assistant professor at Eastern Illinois University. Connelley was elected to the Illinois House of Representatives in 1964.
