= Jack E. Bowers =

American politician and lawyer

Member of the Illinois House of Representatives

Personal details
- Party: Republican

Jack Eldon Bowers (August 28, 1925 – December 11, 2007) was an American politician and lawyer.

Born in Warsaw, Indiana, Bowers went to Manchester College in North Manchester, Indiana, and then received his J.D. degree from University of Chicago Law School. He practiced law in Downers Grove, Illinois. Bowers served in the United States Army Air Forces during World War II. He served as state's attorney for DuPage County, Illinois and as chairman of the Illinois Pardon and Parole Board. Bowers served in the Illinois House of Representatives from 1965 to 1967 and was a Republican. He then served in the Illinois Senate from 1977 to 1983. Bowers died in Normal, Illinois.
