= Gale R. Williams =

American businessman and politician

Gale R. Williams (August 3, 1922 – November 3, 2007) was an American businessman and politician.

Williams was born in Ava, Illinois. He went to Trico High School, in Campbell Hill, Illinois, and Southern Illinois University. Williams served in the United States Marine Corps during World War II. He owned a rental apartment and mobile home business in Murphysboro, Illinois. From 1955 to 1960, Williams served as coroner for Jackson County, Illinois. Williams then served in the Illinois House of Representatives from 1961 to 1973. Williams died at St. Louis University Hospital in St. Louis, Missouri.
