= Frank X. Downey =

American politician

Member of the Illinois House of Representatives

Personal details
- Born: February 3, 1906 Chicago, Illinois
- Party: Democratic

Frank X. Downey was an American politician who served as a member of the Illinois House of Representatives.
