= Clarence E. Neff =

American politician (1909–1988)

Member of the Illinois House of Representatives

Personal details
- Born: August 3, 1909 Springfield, Illinois, U.S.
- Died: July 16, 1988 (aged 78) Rochester, Minnesota, U.S.
- Party: Republican

Clarence E. Neff (August 3, 1909 – July 16, 1988) was an American politician who served as a member of the Illinois House of Representatives.
