= Carl H. Wittmond =

American politician

Member of the Illinois House of Representatives

Personal details
- Born: February 24, 1905 Brussels, Illinois
- Party: Democratic

Carl H. Wittmond (February 24, 1905, Illinois) was an American politician who served as a member of the Illinois House of Representatives.
