= Sample ballot =

Document sent to voters to help them prepare for an election

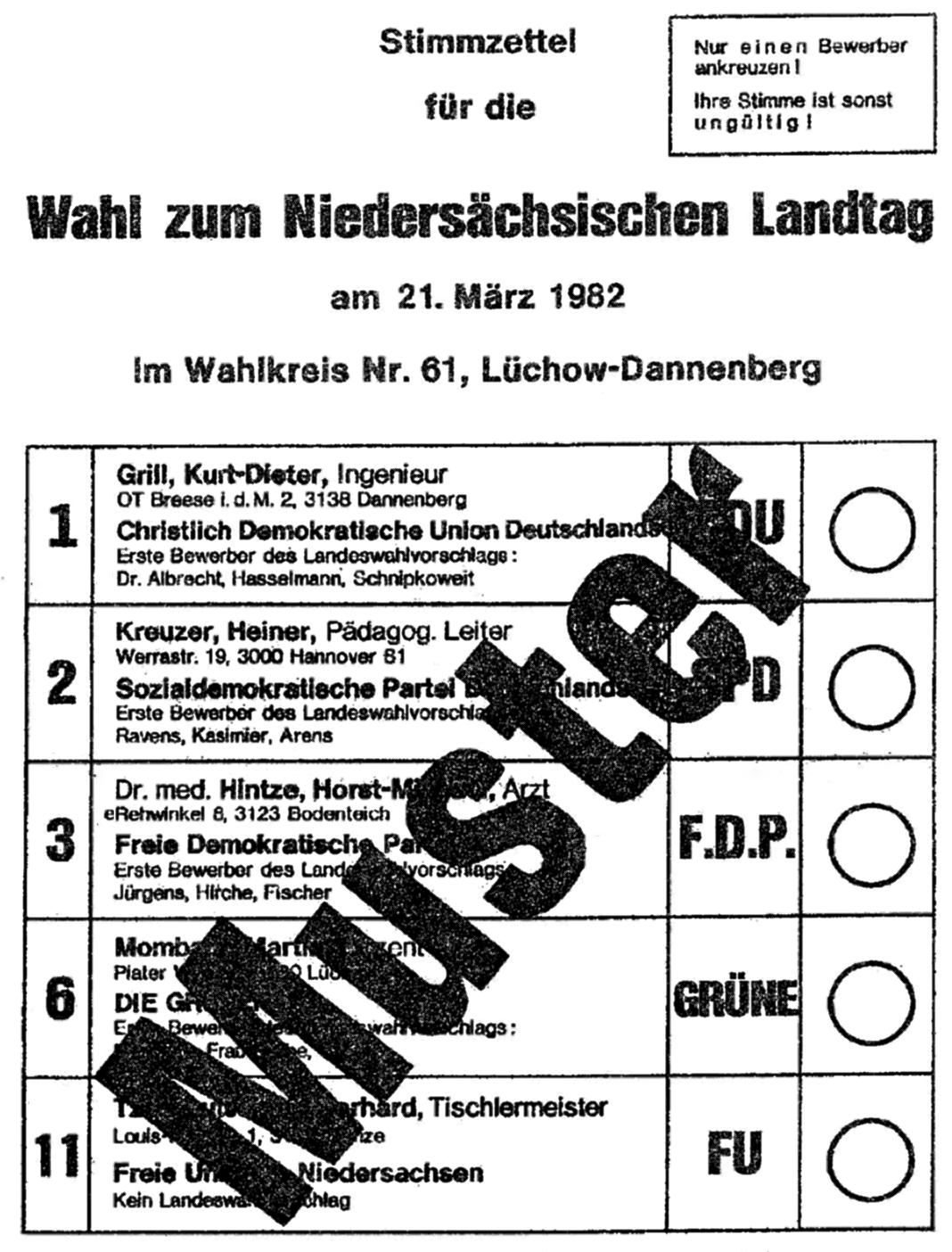

A sample ballot is a document sent to registered voters to help them prepare for an election. A sample ballot usually provides the voter's polling place and hours, and contains an image of what the actual ballot looks like, including candidates, questions, and instructions for voting.
