= Metro-East Journal =

The Metro-East Journal was a newspaper published in East St. Louis, Illinois, from 1888 to 1979.

== History ==
The newspaper was founded as the East St. Louis Journal in 1888. The paper's name was changed to the St. Clair and Madison Counties Evening and Sunday Journal in 1958 and the Metro-East Journal in 1964. When Decatur, Illinois-based Lindsay-Schaub Newspapers, which had owned the paper since 1932, was sold to Lee Enterprises in 1979, the Journal was not included in the purchase. Attempts to find another buyer failed, and the Journal published its last edition on March 30, 1979.

Several factors reportedly contributing to the demise of the Journal included changing demographics in East St. Louis, failure to upgrade newspaper facilities and competition from the Belleville News-Democrat for many of the same readers.
