= Dan E. Costello =

American politician (born 1909)

Member of the Illinois House of Representatives

Personal details
- Born: December 15, 1909 East Saint Louis, Illinois
- Party: Democratic

Dan E. Costello (born December 15, 1909) was an American politician who served as a member of the Illinois House of Representatives.
