= Elmo McClain =

American educator and politician

Elmo "Mac" McClain

Member of the Illinois House of Representatives for the 15th district

Personal details
- Born: 4 August 1917
- Died: 15 June 1972 (aged 54) Springfield, Sangamon County, Illinois, USA
- Party: Democratic
- Spouse: Margaret "Margie" McClain
- Children: Eight, including Michael

Elmo "Mac" McClain (August 4, 1917 – June 15, 1972) was an American educator and politician.

McClain graduated from Quincy University and received a master's degree in education from Western Illinois University. While enrolled at Quincy, McClain was a member of the basketball team.

He served in the United States Army during World War II. McClain lived with his wife and family in Quincy, Illinois. He taught history and was a basketball coach in several Illinois high schools.

McClain served in the Illinois House of Representatives for the 15th district from 1965 until his death in 1972. Upon his election to the house he served on the Illinois School Problems Committee.

McClain died at St. John's Hospital in Springfield, Illinois after suffering a heart attack whilst voting on the Equal Rights Amendment at the Illinois House of Representatives in Springfield, Illinois.

After McClain's passing, his son Michael McClain took over his seat, serving until he was defeated by Jeff Mays. Michael McClain was a close ally of House Speaker Michael Madigan whom he would face corruption charges with in 2024.

In 1978 McClain was inducted into the Illinois Basketball Coach's Hall of Fame
