= Charles Ed Schaefer =

American politician

Member of the Illinois House of Representatives

Personal details
- Born: c.1902 near Nokomis, Illinois, U.S.
- Died: March 27, 1967
- Party: Democratic

Charles Ed Schaefer (c. 1902 – March 27, 1967) was an American politician who served as a member of the Illinois House of Representatives.
