= Bernard M. Peskin =

American politician and attorney (1922–2016)

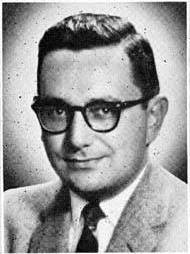

Member of the Illinois House of Representatives
- In office January 7, 1959 – January 4, 1967
- Preceded by: Thomas J. Halpin
- Constituency: 6th district (1959–1965); At-large (1965–1967)

Personal details
- Born: September 22, 1922 Chicago, Illinois, U.S.
- Died: April 24, 2016 (aged 93)
- Party: Democratic

Bernard M. Peskin (September 22, 1922 – April 24, 2016) was an American politician and attorney who served as a member of the Illinois House of Representatives from 1958 to 1966.

== Early life and education ==
Peskin was born on September 22, 1922, in Chicago.

== Political career ==
Peskin was first elected to the Illinois House of Representatives in 1958, running on a platform of constitutional reformation, mental health, and revenue. He left the legislature in 1966.

Peskin was a member of the Northfield Township Democratic Committee.

== Personal life ==
In the late 1960s, after his tenure in the Illinois House of Representatives, Peskin paid around $55,000 to several former officials in the village of Hoffman Estates, to hastily approve zoning for the Kaufman and Broad Barrington Square development. He was convicted of bribery, tax evasion, and conspiracy.

Peskin died on April 24, 2016.
