= Paul J. Randolph =

American politician

Member of the Illinois House of Representatives

Personal details
- Born: Logan County, Illinois
- Party: Republican

Paul J. Randolph was an American politician who served as a member of the Illinois House of Representatives.
