= J. W. Scott (Illinois politician) =

American politician

Member of the Illinois House of Representatives
- In office 1956–1967

Personal details
- Born: April 18, 1915 McLean County, Illinois, US
- Died: October 8, 1967 Bloomington, Illinois, US
- Party: Democratic
- Spouse: Lola Harmeson (m. 1940)
- Education: Illinois State University

J. W. "Bill" Scott (1915–1967) was an American politician who served as a member of the Illinois House of Representatives.

== Biography ==
J. W. Scott was born in McLean County, Illinois on April 18, 1915. He graduated from Arrowsmith High School and Illinois State University.

He married Lola Harmeson in Decatur on Christmas, 1940. He served in the United States Navy from 1942 to 1945.

He was elected to the Illinois House of Representatives in 1956, and was reelected five times.

Scott died from a heart attack at his home in Bloomington on October 8, 1967.
