= John Clinton Youle =

American news editor, meteorologist and politician

Member of the Illinois House of Representatives

Personal details
- Party: Republican

John Clinton Youle (April 4, 1916 – July 23, 1999) was an American news editor, meteorologist and politician.

Youle was born in Chicago, Illinois. He graduated from Wheaton College. Youle served in the United States Army Air Forces during World War II and was commissioned a major. He lived in Scales Mound, Illinois with his wife and family. He worked as a news editor, meteorologist, and owned several newspapers in Illinois. Youle was also involved with cattle raising, investment banking and oil wells. He was one of the world's first weathermen on television. Youle served in the Illinois House of Representatives in 1965 and 1966 and was a Republican. He died at a hospital in Galena, Illinois.
