= Matt Ropa =

American politician

Member of the Illinois House of Representatives

Personal details
- Born: Chicago, Illinois, U.S.
- Party: Democratic

Matt Ropa was an American politician who served as a member of the Illinois House of Representatives.
