= John F. Leon =

American politician

Member of the Illinois House of Representatives

Personal details
- Born: March 9, 1910 Chicago, Illinois, U.S.
- Died: December 21, 1987 (aged 77)
- Party: Democratic

John Francis Leon (March 9, 1910 – December 21, 1987) was an American politician who served as a member of the Illinois House of Representatives.
