= 1954 Illinois elections =

- November 2, 1954
- Turnout: 65.34%

Elections were held in Illinois on Tuesday, November 2, 1954.

Primaries were held April 13, 1954.

== Election information ==
1954 was a midterm election year in the United States.

=== Turnout ===
In the primary election, turnout was 32.06% with 1,695,491 ballots cast (957,042 Democratic and 738,449 Republican).

In the general election, turnout was 65.34% with 3,455,173 ballots cast.

== Federal elections ==
=== United States Senate ===
Democratic Senator Paul Douglas was reelected to a second term.

=== United States House ===
All 25 Illinois seats in the United States House of Representatives were up for election in 1954.

Democrats flipped three Republican-held seats, leaving the Illinois House delegation to consist of 13 Republicans and 12 Democrats.

== State elections ==
=== Treasurer ===
1954 Illinois State Treasurer election
- November 2, 1954
- Turnout: 61.91%
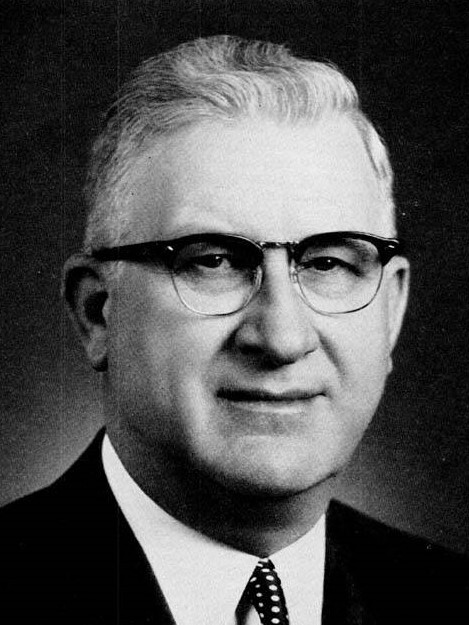

Nominee	Warren Wright	David F. Mallett
Party	Republican	Democratic
Popular vote	1,641,272	1,632,331
Percentage	50.14%	49.86%
- County results Wright: 50–60% 60–70% 70–80% Mallett: 50–60% 60–70%
Treasurer before election
Elmer J. Hoffman
Republican
Elected Treasurer
Warren Wright
Republican

Incumbent first-term Treasurer, Republican Elmer J. Hoffman, did not seek reelection. Republican Warren Wright, a former one-term holder of the office, was elected to succeed him.

This was the final Illinois Treasurer election to a two-year term, as voters also approved a constitutional amendment which extended term length to four-years beginning in the following election.

==== Democratic primary ====
Treasurer Democratic primary
Party	Candidate	Votes	%
Democratic	David F. Mallett	531,647	100
Write-in	Others	2	0.00
Total votes		531,649	100

==== Republican primary ====
Former Illinois Treasurer Warren Wright won the Republican primary. He defeated fellow former Illinois Treasurer Conrad F. Becker, as well as Robert J. Branson.

Treasurer Republican primary
Party	Candidate	Votes	%
Republican	Warren E. Wright	329,565	42.40
Republican	Conrad F. Becker	256,308	32.98
Republican	Robert J. Branson	191,417	24.63
Write-in	Others	1	0.00
Total votes		777,291	100

==== General election ====
Treasurer election
Party	Candidate	Votes	%
Republican	Warren E. Wright	1,641,272	50.14
Democratic	David F. Mallett	1,632,331	49.86
Total votes		3,273,603	100

=== Superintendent of Public Instruction ===
1954 Illinois Superintendent of Public Instruction election
- November 2, 1954
- Turnout: 61.81%
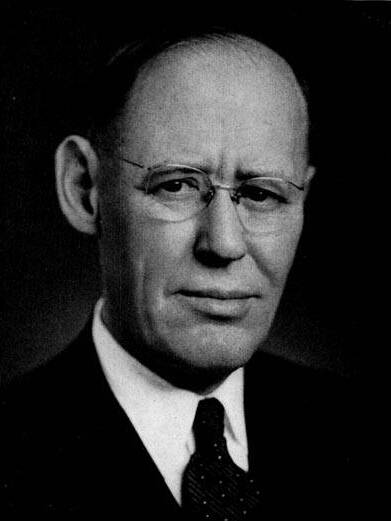

Nominee	Vernon L. Nickell	Mark A. Peterman
Party	Republican	Democratic
Popular vote	1,653,174	1,615,325
Percentage	50.58%	49.42%
- County results Nickell: 50–60% 60–70% 70–80% Peterman: 50–60% 60–70%
Superintendent before election
Vernon L. Nickell
Republican
Elected Superintendent
Vernon L. Nickell
Republican

Incumbent Superintendent of Public Instruction Vernon L. Nickell, a Republican, was elected to a fourth term.

==== Democratic primary ====
Superintendent of Public Instruction Democratic primary
Party	Candidate	Votes	%
Democratic	Mark A. Peterman	523,876	100
Total votes		523,876	100

==== Republican primary ====
Superintendent of Public Instruction Republican primary
Party	Candidate	Votes	%
Republican	Vernon L. Nickell (incumbent)	701,257	100
Write-in	Others	9	0.00
Total votes		701,266	100

==== General election ====
Superintendent of Public Instruction election
Party	Candidate	Votes	%
Republican	Vernon L. Nickell (incumbent)	1,653,174	50.58
Democratic	Mark A. Peterman	1,615,325	49.42
Write-in	Others	12	
Total votes		3,268,511	100

=== State Senate ===
Seats in the Illinois Senate were up for election in 1954. Republicans retained control of the chamber.

=== State House of Representatives ===
Seats in the Illinois House of Representatives were up for election in 1954. Republicans retained control of the chamber.

=== Trustees of University of Illinois ===
1954 Trustees of University of Illinois election
- November 2, 1954

An election was held for three of nine seats for Trustees of University of Illinois.

The election saw the reelection of Democrat former member Kenney E. Williamson (who previously had served one full term and a partial term), and first-term Democratic incumbents George Wirt Herrick, Frances Best Watkins.

Trustees of the University of Illinois election
Party	Candidate	Votes	%
Democratic	Kenney E. Williamson	1,683,790½	17.45
Democratic	George Wirt Herrick (incumbent)	1,672,794½	17.34
Democratic	Frances Best Watkins (incumbent)	1,648,798½	17.09
Republican	Dr. Ralph H. Kunstadter	1,582,397½	16.40
Republican	Vernon L. Heath	1,562,347	16.19
Republican	Maurice Gantzert	1,498,812½	15.53
Total votes		9,648,943	100

=== Judicial elections ===
==== Supreme Court ====
===== Fifth Supreme Court Judicial District =====
A judicial election was held on June 7, 1954, for the Fifth Supreme Court Judicial District. Republican Joseph E. Daily was unopposed.

Fifth Supreme Court Judicial District
Party	Candidate	Votes	%
Republican	Joseph E. Daily (incumbent)	985	99.90
Others	Others	1	0.10
Total votes		986	100

==== Lower courts ====
On November 2, 1954, a special election was held to fill a vacancy on the Circuit Court of Cook County.

=== Ballot measures ===
Three ballot measures were put before voters in 1954. All three were legislatively referred constitutional amendments.

In order to be approved, legislatively referred state statues required the support of a majority of those voting on the statute. In order to be placed on the ballot, proposed legislatively referred constitutional amendments needed to be approved by two-thirds of each house of the Illinois General Assembly. In order to be approved, they required approval of either two-thirds of those voting on the amendment itself or a majority of all ballots cast in the general elections.

==== Illinois Michigan Canal Amendment ====
The Illinois Michigan Canal Amendment was approved. It eliminated from the constitution the requirement that the Illinois and Michigan Canal or other canal and or waterway could only be sold or leased with specific approval of a majority of voters participating in a general state election. It also removed from the constitution the provision under which the Illinois deep waterway was both financed and constructed.

Illinois Michigan Canal Amendment
Option	Votes	% of votes on measure	% of all ballots cast
Yes	2,011,134	79.34	58.20
No	523,572	20.66	15.15
Total votes	2,534,706	100	73.97
Voter turnout	47.93%		

Amendment results by county Yes: 80–90%; 70–80%; 60–70%; 50–60%; No: 80–90%; 70–80%; 60–70%; 50–60%

==== Legislative Apportionment Amendment ====
Legislative Apportionment Amendment, a legislatively referred constitutional amendment which amended Sections 6, 7, and 8 of Article IV of the 1870 Constitution of Illinois was approved by voters. Among other specifications, it directed the Illinois General Assembly to elect one Senator from each of 58 senatorial districts and three representatives from each of 59 representative districts.

In order for constitutional amendments to be passed by voters, they required either two-thirds support among those specifically voting on the measure or 50% support among all ballots cast in the elections.

Legislative Apportionment Amendment
Option	Votes	% of votes on measure	% of all ballots cast
Yes	2,085,224	79.87	60.35
No	525,502	20.13	15.21
Total votes	2,610,726	100	75.56
Voter turnout	49.37%		

Amendment results by county Yes: 80–90%; 70–80%; 60–70%; 50–60%; No: 80–90%; 70–80%; 60–70%; 50–60%

==== State Treasurer Amendment ====
State Treasurer Amendment, a legislatively referred constitutional amendment which amended Sections 1, 2, and 3 of Article IV of the 1870 Constitution of Illinois was approved by voters. Among its changes was, beginning with the 1956 election, making the term of the State Treasurer be expanded from two to four years.

In order for constitutional amendments to be passed by voters, they required either two-thirds support among those specifically voting on the measure or 50% support among all ballots cast in the elections.

State Treasurer Amendment
Option	Votes	% of votes on measure	% of all ballots cast
Yes	2,024,483	79.21	58.59
No	531,318	20.79	15.38
Total votes	2,555,801	100	73.97
Voter turnout	48.33%		

Amendment results by county Yes: 80–90%; 70–80%; 60–70%; 50–60%; No: 80–90%; 60–70%; 50–60%

== Local elections ==
Local elections were held.
