= Ronald Alan Hurst =

American politician (1930–2024)

Member of the Illinois House of Representatives

Personal details
- Born: April 16, 1930 Fond du Lac, Wisconsin, U.S.
- Died: May 7, 2024 (aged 94)
- Party: Republican

Ronald Alan Hurst (April 16, 1930 – May 7, 2024) was an American politician. He served as a Republican member of the Illinois House of Representatives.

Hurst died on May 7, 2024, at the age of 94.
