= Phillip C. Goldstick =

American politician (1931–2025)

Philip C. Goldstick
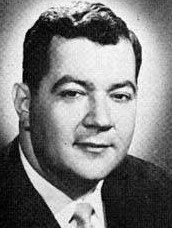

Member of the Illinois House of Representatives
- In office 1965–1967

Personal details
- Born: March 23, 1931 (age 95) Chicago, Illinois, U.S.
- Died: February 5, 2025 Scottsdale, Arizona
- Party: Democratic
- Children: 2

Philip Charles Goldstick (March 23, 1931 – 5 February 2025) was an American lawyer and politician who served as a member of the Illinois House of Representatives in the 1960s. Goldstick began his career as a lawyer after receiving his license to practice law in 1958, working as a real estate attorney. Goldstick married Beverly Kramer in 1951. He is the namesake for the Goldstick Initiative for the Study of Communication Disorders.

== Early life and education ==
He was educated in Brywn Elementary, and Morton High School. Between 1953 and 1955 he served in the military as a first lieutenant. He graduated from DePaul College of Law in 1956.

== Later life ==
Goldstick was elected to the board of the University of Illinois, and later became a life member.

== See also ==
- Phillip C. Goldstick obituary in the Chicago Tribune
