= Daniel O'Neill (Illinois politician) =

American politician

Member of the Illinois House of Representatives

Personal details
- Born: September 2, 1928 (age 97) Alton, Illinois, U.S.
- Party: Democratic

Daniel O'Neill is a former American politician who served as a member of the Illinois House of Representatives.
