= John P. Downes =

American politician

Member of the Illinois House of Representatives

Personal details
- Party: Democratic

John P. Downes was an American politician who served as a member of the Illinois House of Representatives.
