= Ben S. Rhodes =

American politician

Member of the Illinois House of Representatives

Personal details
- Born: April 11, 1889 Saunemin, Illinois
- Died: Unknown
- Party: Republican

Ben S. Rhodes was an American politician who served as a member of the Illinois House of Representatives.
