= Charles W. Clabaugh =

American educator, businessman, and politician (1900–1987)

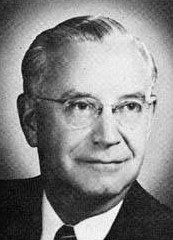

Member of the Illinois House of Representatives
- In office 1939–1974

Personal details
- Born: August 15, 1900 Lerna, Illinois, U.S.
- Died: March 23, 1987 (aged 86) Champaign, Illinois, U.S.
- Party: Republican
- Education: Eastern Illinois University

Charles Wesley Clabaugh (August 15, 1900 – March 23, 1983) was an American educator, businessman, and politician.

Clabaugh was born in Lerna, Coles County, Illinois. He graduated from Urbana High School in Urbana, Illinois. He received his bachelor's degree in education from Eastern Illinois University and taught school in Lerna, Illinois and Farmington, Illinois. Clabaugh owned the Champaign Weather Strip Company in Champaign, Illinois. Clabaugh served in the Illinois House of Representatives from 1939 until 1974 and was a Republican. Clabaugh died at a nursing home in Champaign, Illinois.
