= Frank Lyman (Illinois politician) =

American politician (1917–1986)

Member of the Illinois House of Representatives

Personal details
- Born: January 20, 1917 Chicago, Illinois, U.S.
- Died: June 29, 1986 (aged 69)
- Party: Democratic

James Frank Lyman (January 20, 1917 – June 29, 1986) was an American politician who served as a member of the Illinois House of Representatives. Lyman died on June 29, 1986, at the age of 69.
