= James A. McLendon =

American politician

Member of the Illinois House of Representatives

Personal details
- Born: Washington, Georgia
- Party: Democratic

James A. McLendon was an American politician who served as a member of the Illinois House of Representatives.
