= William E. Hartnett =

American lawyer and politician

Member of the Illinois House of Representatives

Personal details
- Party: Democratic

William E. Hartnett (December 4, 1919 – July 21, 2002) was an American lawyer and politician.

== Biography ==
Hartnett was born in Chicago, Illinois. He served in the United States Army as a pilot during World War II.

He graduated from the University of Virginia School of Law in 1947. He practiced law in Waukegan, Illinois and Woodstock, Illinois. Hartnett also served as an attorney for the National Labor Relations Board in St. Louis, Missouri.

Hartnett was involved in the Democratic Party and was involved with the labor union movement. In 1952, he ran for the United States House of Representatives and lost the election. Hartnett served in the Illinois House of Representatives in 1965 and 1966. In 1970, he ran for the Illinois Supreme Court and lost the election.

== Personal life ==
In 1986, Hartnett moved with wife to Lake Geneva, Wisconsin.

He died at his home in Lake Geneva, Wisconsin from heart failure.
