= Fred Branson (politician) =

American politician (1916–1985)

Member of the Illinois House of Representatives from the 55th district

Personal details
- Born: August 31, 1916; Salem, Illinois, U.S.
- Died: December 5, 1985 (aged 69)
- Political party: Republican

Fred Arthur Branson (August 31, 1916 – December 5, 1985) was an American politician who served as a member of the Illinois House of Representatives. Branson died on December 5, 1985, at the age of 69.
