= 74th Illinois General Assembly =

1965 to 1966 legislative session

←	73rd	75th	→
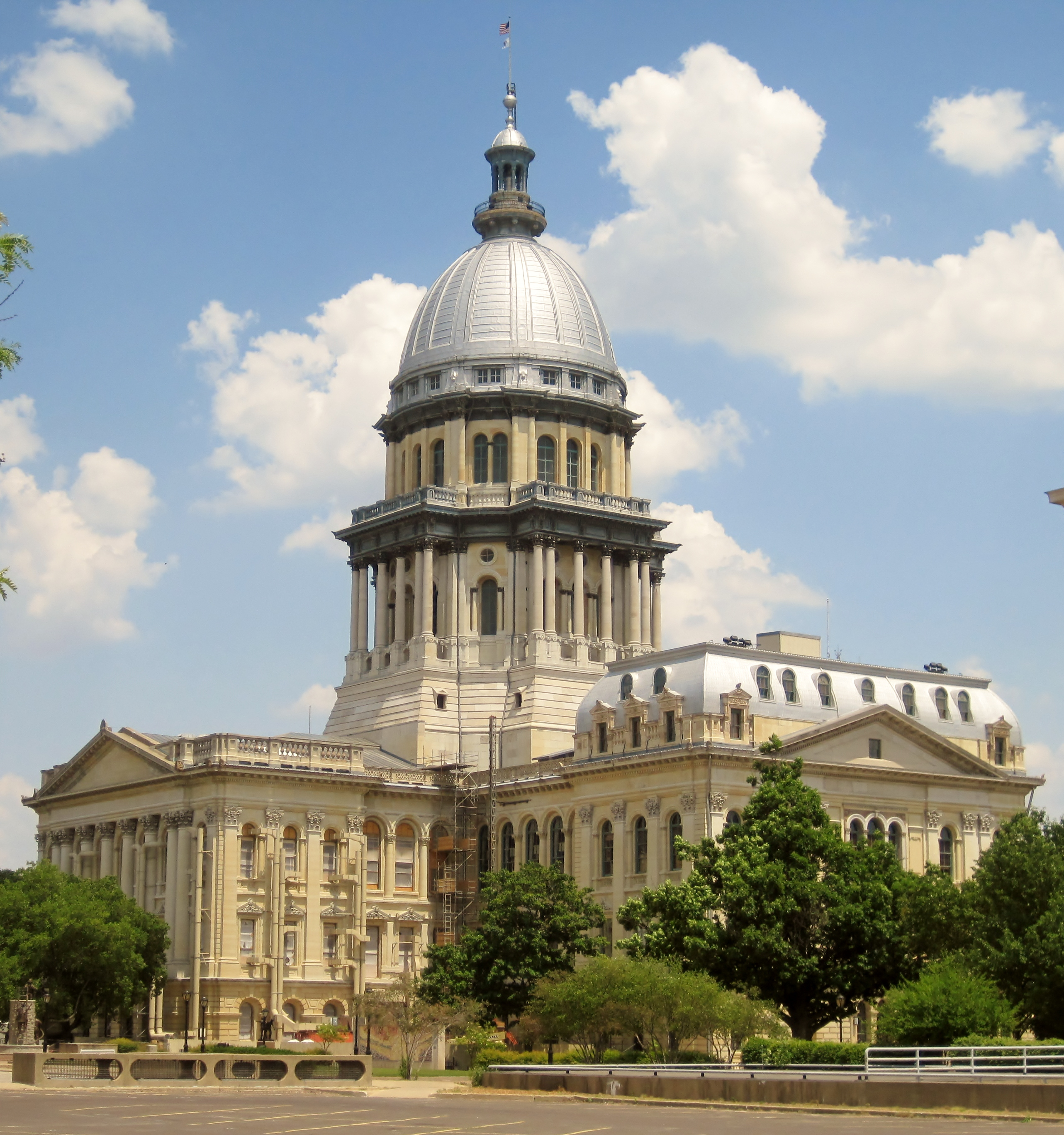
- The Illinois State Capitol

Overview
- Meeting place: Springfield, Illinois
- Term: 1965 – 1966
- Election: 1964

Illinois Senate
- President: Samuel H. Shapiro, Democrat
- President pro tempore: W. Russell Arrington, Republican

Illinois House of Representatives
- Speaker: John P. Touhy, Democrat

The 74th Illinois General Assembly convened on January 6, 1965, and adjourned sine die on June 30, 1965. The General Assembly consists of the Illinois House of Representatives and the Illinois Senate.

== Legislation ==
The 74th General Assembly set a record for the number of bills introduced, at 3,590. Of these, 2,211 were passed by both houses and sent to the governor. Governor Otto Kerner Jr. vetoed 267 in their entirety and 13 in part.

Notable laws enacted by the 74th General Assembly include the Local Governmental and Governmental Employees Tort Immunity Act, which provided sweeping protection from civil liability for government workers. The legislature also enacted a measure to curb the use of billboards on Illinois highways, which was amended several times thereafter, and the state's first Good Samaritan law making physicians who render assistance in emergencies immune from civil liability.

Notable failed legislation in the 74th General Assembly included a measure to abolish capital punishment in Illinois, which passed the House by a 97–69 vote. Had it been enacted, Illinois would have joined Iowa, New York, West Virginia, and Vermont in ending capital punishment that year. Instead, the Illinois death penalty remained on the books until 2011.

== Senate ==
Following the 1964 election, the Illinois Senate contained 58 members, one from each senate district. Under the Illinois Constitution of 1870, Senators served overlapping 4-year terms. Thus, the 29 senators representing even-numbered districts were elected in 1964, the remainder having been elected in 1962.

=== Senate leadership ===
Position	Image	Name	Party	District
Lieutenant Governor and President of the Senate		Samuel H. Shapiro	Democratic	—N/a
President Pro Tempore		W. Russell Arrington	Republican	4

=== Party composition ===
The Senate of the 74th General Assembly consisted of 33 Republicans and 25 Democrats. The number of Democrats soon fell to 24, however, when Theodore Swinarski of the 14th District was unseated due to a failure to meet residency requirements.

Affiliation	Members
Democratic Party	25
Republican Party	33
Total	58

=== State senators ===
District	Counties represented	Senator	Party	First year	Committees
1	Cook	Arthur J. Bidwill	Republican	1935	Member: Appropriations; Committee On Committees; Executive; (chair); Insurance; Municipalities; Public Utilities and Railroads (vice-chair)
2	Cook	Arthur W. Sprague	Republican	1957	Member: Committee On Committees; Education; Executive; Judiciary (chair); Municipalities; Reapportionment; Revenue (vice-chair)
3	Cook	John A. Graham	Republican	1957	Member: Elections (chair); Industrial Affairs; Municipalities; Public Utilities and Railroads; Revenue; Senate Affairs (vice-chair)
4	Cook	W. Russell Arrington	Republican	1955	Member: Executive; (vice-chair); Industrial Affairs; Insurance; Judiciary; Reapportionment; Revenue; Rules (chair)
5	Cook	Nathan J. Kinnally	Democratic	1963	Member: Education; Elections; Insurance; Judiciary; Municipalities; Rules
6	Cook	Frank M. Ozinga	Republican	1957	Member: Appropriations; Banks, Savings and Loan Associations (vice-chair); Committee On Committees; Elections; Highways and Traffic Regulations; License and Miscellany (chair); Public Utilities and Railroads; Senate Affairs
7	Cook	Anthony J. DeTolve	Democratic	1959	Member: Committee On Committees; Insurance; Judiciary; Municipalities; Revenue
8	Cook	Arthur R. Gottschalk	Republican	1961	Member: Elections; Executive; Industrial Affairs (chair); Public Utilities and Railroads; Public Welfare
9	Cook	Morgan M. Finley	Democratic	1959	Member: Appropriations; Banks, Savings and Loan Associations; Elections; Executive; Highways and Traffic Regulations; Reapportionment; Revenue; Senate Affairs
10	Cook	Thomas G. Lyons	Democratic	1965	Member: Aeronautics and Military Affairs; Committee On Committees; Education; Industrial Affairs; Judiciary; Municipalities; Revenue
11	Cook	Fred J. Smith	Democratic	1955	Member: License and Miscellany; Public Utilities and Railroads; Public Welfare
12	Cook	John J. Lanigan	Republican	1965	Member: Aeronautics and Military Affairs (vice-chair); Conservation; Elections; License and Miscellany; Pensions and Personnel; Public Welfare
13	Cook	Daniel Dougherty	Democratic	1955	Member: Appropriations; Education; Elections; Executive; Industrial Affairs; Municipalities; Reapportionment
14	Cook	Theodore Swinarski	Democratic	1965	
15	Cook	A. L. Cronin	Democratic	1955	Member: Agriculture; Appropriations; Executive; Judiciary; Public Utilities and Railroads
16	Livingston, Woodford	William C. Harris	Republican	1961	Member: Appropriations; Banks, Savings and Loan Associations; Committee On Committees (chair); Industrial Affairs; Public Utilities and Railroads; Revenue; Senate Affairs
17	Cook	Arthur Swanson	Republican	1963	Member: Aeronautics and Military Affairs; Highways and Traffic Regulations; License and Miscellany; Municipalities (chair); Public Welfare
18	Marshall, Peoria, Stark	Hudson R. Sours	Republican	1961	Member: Industrial Affairs (vice-chair); Judiciary; Pensions and Personnel; Reapportionment; Revenue (chair)
19	Cook	Robert F. Hatch	Republican	1963	Member: Elections; Judiciary; Municipalities; Reapportionment (chair); Revenue
20	Iroquois, Kankakee	Samuel E. Martin	Republican	1961	Member: Agriculture; Appropriations; Banks, Savings and Loan Associations; Highways and Traffic Regulations (chair); Public Utilities and Railroads; Revenue
21	Cook	Thomas A. McGloon	Democratic	1959	Member: Appropriations; Committee On Committees; Executive; Insurance; Judiciary; Public Utilities and Railroads
22	Edgar, Vermilion	Tom Merritt	Republican	1965	Member: Agriculture; Conservation; Highways and Traffic Regulations; Insurance; Municipalities; Pensions and Personnel (vice-chair)
23	Cook	Frank J. Kocarek	Democratic	1951	Member: Banks, Savings and Loan Associations; Conservation; Highways and Traffic Regulations; Industrial Affairs; Insurance; Municipalities; Pensions and Personnel; Revenue; Senate Affairs
24	Champaign, Moultrie, Piatt	Everett R. Peters	Republican	1941	Member: Appropriations (chair); Banks, Savings and Loan Associations; Committee On Committees (vice-chair); Education; Executive;
25	Cook	Joseph L. DeLaCour	Democratic	1963	Member: Aeronautics and Military Affairs; Insurance; Municipalities; Public Utilities and Railroads; Senate Affairs
26	Ford, McLean	David Davis	Republican	1951	Member: Agriculture; Banks, Savings and Loan Associations; Education (chair); Insurance; Judiciary; Reapportionment (vice-chair); Rules
27	Cook	Robert E. Cherry	Democratic	1955	Member: Appropriations; Education; Executive; Judiciary; Rules
28	De Witt, Logan, Macon	Robert W. McCarthy	Democratic	1961	Member: Committee On Committees; Elections; Executive; Judiciary; Revenue
29	Cook	Walter Hoffelder	Republican	1963	Member: Enrolling and Engrossing (chair); Highways and Traffic Regulations; Industrial Affairs; License and Miscellany (vice-chair); Municipalities
30	Mason, Menard, Tazewell	Egbert B. Groen	Republican	1953	Member: Banks, Savings and Loan Associations; Executive; Insurance (chair); Judiciary; Pensions and Personnel; Revenue
31	Cook	Bernard S. Neistein	Democratic	1959	Member: Appropriations; Executive; Pensions and Personnel; Revenue
32	Hancock, McDonough	Clifford B. Latherow	Republican	1965	Member: Agriculture; Conservation; Elections (vice-chair); Pensions and Personnel; Public Welfare
33	Cook	Thad L. Kusibab	Democratic	1959	Member: Banks, Savings and Loan Associations; Conservation; Elections; Insurance; Pensions and Personnel; Public Utilities and Railroads
34	Clark, Coles, Cumberland, Douglas	Paul Graham	Republican	1961	Member: Agriculture (vice-chair); Conservation (vice-chair); Executive; Highways and Traffic Regulations; License and Miscellany; Public Utilities and Railroads
35	De Kalb, Lee, Whiteside	Dennis J. Collins	Republican	1943	Member: Agriculture (chair); Appropriations; Education; Executive; Insurance (vice-chair); Judiciary
36	Adams, Calhoun, Pike, Scott	Thomas Awerkamp	Democratic	1965	Member: Aeronautics and Military Affairs; Agriculture; Conservation; Education; Highways and Traffic Regulations; Public Welfare
37	Bureau, Henry	Joseph R. Peterson	Republican	1957	Member: Assignment of Bills (vice-chair); Elections; Executive; Industrial Affairs; Judiciary; Reapportionment; Revenue; Rules (vice-chair)
38	Bond, Macoupin, Montgomery	William D. Lyons	Democratic	1961	Member: Banks, Savings and Loan Associations; Highways and Traffic Regulations; Industrial Affairs; License and Miscellany; Municipalities; Public Welfare
39	LaSalle, Putnam	Fred J. Hart	Republican	1951	Member: Appropriations (vice-chair); Banks, Savings and Loan Associations; Committee On Committees; Conservation; Contingent Expense (chair); Executive; Highways and Traffic Regulations; Senate Affairs
40	Christian, Fayette, Shelby	Stuart J. Traynor	Democratic	1965	Member: Agriculture; Assignment of Bills; Committee On Committees; Education; Elections; Insurance; Pensions and Personnel; Senate Affairs
41	Du Page, Will	Harris W. Fawell	Republican	1963	Member: Aeronautics and Military Affairs; Education; Insurance; Judiciary; Municipalities; Public Welfare (chair)
42	Clay, Clinton, Effingham, Marion	James Donnewald	Democratic	1965	Member: Aeronautics and Military Affairs; Agriculture; Conservation; Contingent Expense
43	Brown, Fulton, Schuyler	Robert A. Welch	Democratic	1959	Member: Agriculture; Banks, Savings and Loan Associations; Highways and Traffic Regulations; Public Utilities and Railroads
44	Jackson, Monroe, Randolph	John G. Gilbert	Republican	1961	Member: Banks, Savings and Loan Associations (chair); Conservation; Education; Highways and Traffic Regulations; Judiciary; Reapportionment
45	Cass, Morgan, Ogle County	Brian Stewart	Republican	2018	Member: Appropriations; Banks, Savings and Loan Associations; Committee On Committees; Executive; Insurance; Judiciary; Public Utilities and Railroads (chair); Rules
46	Edwards, Jefferson, Wabash, Wayne	Paul W. Broyles	Republican	1945	Member: Aeronautics and Military Affairs; Appropriations; Banks, Savings and Loan Associations; Committee On Committees; Education (vice-chair); Elections; Executive; Senate Affairs (chair)
47	Greene, Jersey, Madison	Paul Simon	Democratic	1963	Member: Committee On Committees; Conservation; Education; Public Welfare; Reapportionment
48	Crawford, Jasper, Lawrence, Richland	Philip B. Benefiel	Democratic	1965	Member: Agriculture; Conservation; Enrolling and Engrossing; Judiciary
49	Perry, St. Clair, Washington	Alan J. Dixon	Democratic	1963	Member: Appropriations; Elections; Executive; Judiciary; Reapportionment; Revenue; Rules
50	Alexander, Pulaski, Union, Williamson	William L. Grindle	Democratic	1957	Member: Banks, Savings and Loan Associations; Highways and Traffic Regulations; Industrial Affairs; License and Miscellany; Public Welfare
51	Hardin, Johnson, Massac, Pope, Saline	Gordon E. Kerr	Republican	1959	Member: Agriculture; Appropriations; Committee On Committees; Conservation (chair); Contingent Expense (vice-chair); Elections; License and Miscellany; Senate Affairs
52	Boone, Lake, McHenry	Robert E. Coulson	Republican	1963	Member: Aeronautics and Military Affairs; Assignment of Bills (chair); Education; Pensions and Personnel; Revenue
53	Henderson, Mercer, Rock Island	Donald D. Carpentier	Republican	1939	Member: Aeronautics and Military Affairs; Highways and Traffic Regulations (vice-chair); Insurance; License and Miscellany; Senate Affairs
54	Ogle, Winnebago	Bertil T. Rosander	Republican	1965	Member: Agriculture; Conservation; Highways and Traffic Regulations; Municipalities; Public Welfare (vice-chair)
55	Franklin, Gallatin, Hamilton, White	Paul A. Ziegler	Democratic	1957	Member: Appropriations; Banks, Savings and Loan Associations; Executive; Highways and Traffic Regulations; License and Miscellany; Revenue
56	Carroll, Jo Daviess, Stephenson	Everett Laughlin	Republican	1961	Member: Education; Insurance; Judiciary (vice-chair); Pensions and Personnel (chair); Public Welfare; Revenue; Rules
57	Knox, Warren	Richard R. Larson	Republican	1957	Member: Aeronautics and Military Affairs (chair); Appropriations; Committee On Committees; Education; Elections; Executive; Municipalities (vice-chair)
58	Grundy, Kane, Kendall	Robert Mitchler	Republican	1965	Member: Agriculture; Conservation; Enrolling and Engrossing (vice-chair); Industrial Affairs; Public Utilities and Railroads; Public Welfare

== House of Representatives ==
Under the Illinois Constitution of 1870, the state representatives were elected by cumulative voting, with each voter distributing three votes among the available candidates. The Illinois House of Representatives as elected in 1964 thus contained 177 members, representing three for each of the state's 59 House districts.

However, in a nationally unprecedented event, in 1964 all members of the Illinois State House were elected at-large statewide, as a result of the legislature's failure to agree on a redistricting plan the previous year. The resulting ballot was 33 inches (84 cm) long. Because of the length of the ballot, the election was remembered as the "bedsheet ballot" election.

Both parties ran slates of 118 candidates. The House had previously had a Republican majority, but in 1964 every Democratic candidate was elected, giving Democrats a two-thirds majority in the House. Representative Zeke Giorgi attributed the Democratic victory to the effect of the Democratic landslide in the presidential election. As a result, the election saw a very large number of Republican incumbents lose their seats. The election swept in 49 new Democratic representatives, launching the careers of several Democratic politicians who later became prominent, including Adlai E. Stevenson III and Harold Washington.

The members of the House represented a historically unusual proportion of Chicago-area representatives, because the at-large voting system eliminated the longstanding gerrymander in favor of downstate. Consequently, Illinois' 1965 redistricting, which implemented the one person, one vote rule imposed by the United States Supreme Court in Reynolds v. Sims, had little effect on the subsequent balance of power in the House.

=== House leadership ===
Position	image	Name	Party
Speaker of the House		John P. Touhy	Democratic
Majority Leader		Clyde L. Choate	Democratic
Majority Whip		Paul F. Elward	Democratic
Minority Leader		Albert W. Hachmeister	Republican
Minority Whip		John C. Parkhurst	Republican

=== Party composition ===
Affiliation	Members
Democratic Party	118
Republican Party	59
Total	177

=== State representatives ===
District	Counties represented	Representative	Party	First year	Committees
—N/a	—N/a	John W. Alsup	Democratic	1959	Member: Elections (vice-chair); Revenue; Roads and Bridges
—N/a	—N/a	Charles F. Armstrong	Democratic	1957	Member: Education (vice-chair); Judiciary; Roads and Bridges
—N/a	—N/a	Bert Baker	Democratic	1955	Member: License and Miscellany (chair); Liquor Regulation; Motor Vehicles and Traffic Regulation
—N/a	—N/a	Tobias Barry	Democratic	1961	Member: Banks and Savings and Loan Associations; Enrolling, Transcribing and Typing of Bills; Executive; Revenue; Rules
—N/a	—N/a	Francis J. Berry	Republican	1965	Member: Motor Vehicles and Traffic Regulation; Municipalities; Waterways, Conservation, Fish and Game
—N/a	—N/a	W. Robert Blair	Republican	1965	Member: Industry and Labor Relations; Municipalities; Public Utilities, Railroads and Aviation
—N/a	—N/a	William L. Blaser	Republican	1965	Member: Executive; Industry and Labor Relations; Personnel and Pensions
—N/a	—N/a	Paul P. Boswell	Republican	1965	Member: Motor Vehicles and Traffic Regulation; Personnel and Pensions; Public Aid, Health, Welfare and Safety; Reapportionment
—N/a	—N/a	Jack Bowers	Republican	1965	Member: Judiciary; Military and Veteran Affairs; Municipalities
—N/a	—N/a	Frank J. Broucek	Democratic	1965	Member: Elections; Personnel and Pensions; Revenue
—N/a	—N/a	George M. Burditt	Republican	1965	Member: Elections; Executive; Reapportionment; Roads and Bridges
—N/a	—N/a	Joseph R. Callahan	Democratic	1965	Member: Agriculture; Industry and Labor Relations; Public Utilities, Railroads and Aviation
—N/a	—N/a	Peter M. Callan	Democratic	1959	
—N/a	—N/a	Robert R. Canfield	Republican	1965	Member: Insurance; Judiciary; Public Aid, Health, Welfare and Safety
—N/a	—N/a	James D. Carrigan	Democratic	1947	Member: Liquor Regulation (chair); Motor Vehicles and Traffic Regulation; Reapportionment (vice-chair); Revenue
—N/a	—N/a	John W. Carroll	Republican	1957	Member: Appropriations; Enrolling, Transcribing and Typing of Bills; Public Aid, Health, Welfare and Safety; Roads and Bridges
—N/a	—N/a	James Y. Carter	Democratic	1955	Member: Banks and Savings and Loan Associations; Executive (vice-chair); Insurance
—N/a	—N/a	John E. Cassidy Jr.	Democratic	1965	Member: Judiciary; Revenue; Waterways, Conservation, Fish and Game
—N/a	—N/a	Eugenia S. Chapman	Democratic	1965	Member: Education; Public Aid, Health, Welfare and Safety; Roads and Bridges
—N/a	—N/a	Clyde L. Choate	Democratic	1947	
—N/a	—N/a	Charles W. Clabaugh	Republican	1939	Member: Appropriations; Contingent Expenses; Education; Waterways, Conservation, Fish and Game
—N/a	—N/a	Terrel E. Clarke	Republican	1957	Member: Executive; Motor Vehicles and Traffic Regulation; Revenue; Rules
—N/a	—N/a	Otis G. Collins	Democratic	1965	Member: Industry and Labor Relations; Personnel and Pensions; Public Aid, Health, Welfare and Safety
—N/a	—N/a	Joseph T. Connelly	Democratic	1965	Member: Education; Elections; Military and Veteran Affairs
—N/a	—N/a	John H. Conolly	Republican	1963	Member: Industry and Labor Relations; Insurance; Public Utilities, Railroads and Aviation
—N/a	—N/a	Dan E. Costello	Democratic	1965	Member: Enrolling, Transcribing and Typing of Bills; Industry and Labor Relations; Municipalities; Waterways, Conservation, Fish and Game
—N/a	—N/a	Kenneth W. Course	Democratic	1957	Member: Banks and Savings and Loan Associations; Executive; License and Miscellany
—N/a	—N/a	Robert Craig	Democratic	1955	Member: Agriculture; Education; Motor Vehicles and Traffic Regulation (vice-chair)
—N/a	—N/a	William J. Cunningham	Republican	1965	Member: Industry and Labor Relations; Municipalities; Public Utilities, Railroads and Aviation
—N/a	—N/a	Edwin E. Dale	Republican	1959	Member: Appropriations; Liquor Regulation; Waterways, Conservation, Fish and Game
—N/a	—N/a	John M. Daley	Democratic	1959	Member: Insurance; Judiciary; Public Utilities, Railroads and Aviation (chair)
—N/a	—N/a	Corneal A. Davis	Democratic	1943	Member: Executive; Motor Vehicles and Traffic Regulation; Public Aid, Health, Welfare and Safety (chair)
—N/a	—N/a	Frances L. Dawson	Republican	1957	Member: Education; License and Miscellany; Personnel and Pensions
—N/a	—N/a	LaSalle J. DeMichaels	Democratic	1961	Member: Contingent Expenses; Elections; Municipalities; Public Aid, Health, Welfare and Safety
—N/a	—N/a	Lawrence DiPrima	Democratic	1963	Member: Elections; Executive; Military and Veteran Affairs
—N/a	—N/a	John P. Downes	Democratic	1957	Member: Appropriations (vice-chair); Municipalities; Revenue
—N/a	—N/a	Frank X. Downey	Democratic	1957	Member: Elections; License and Miscellany; Liquor Regulation
—N/a	—N/a	Earl D. Eisenhower	Republican	1965	Member: Agriculture; Motor Vehicles and Traffic Regulation; Public Utilities, Railroads and Aviation
—N/a	—N/a	Paul F. Elward	Democratic	1957	Member: Rules (vice-chair)
—N/a	—N/a	Andrew A. Euzzino	Democratic	1943	Member: Insurance (chair); Judiciary; Municipalities
—N/a	—N/a	Joseph F. Fanta	Democratic	1957	Member: Elections; Municipalities; Personnel and Pensions
—N/a	—N/a	John G. Fary	Democratic	1955	Member: Appropriations; Insurance (vice-chair); Liquor Regulation
—N/a	—N/a	Joseph Fennessey	Democratic	1965	Member: Agriculture; Liquor Regulation; Motor Vehicles and Traffic Regulation
—N/a	—N/a	Wayne Fitzgerrell	Republican	1957	Member: Agriculture; Appropriations; Revenue
—N/a	—N/a	William J. Frey	Democratic	1965	Member: Agriculture; Motor Vehicles and Traffic Regulation; Public Utilities, Railroads and Aviation
—N/a	—N/a	Benedict Garmisa	Democratic	1965	Member: Appropriations; Public Utilities, Railroads and Aviation; Roads and Bridges
—N/a	—N/a	Herbert F. Geisler	Republican	1965	Member: Judiciary; Public Aid, Health, Welfare and Safety; Roads and Bridges
—N/a	—N/a	William A. Giblin	Democratic	1965	Member: Agriculture; Executive; Motor Vehicles and Traffic Regulation
—N/a	—N/a	Zeke Giorgi	Democratic	1965	Member: Industry and Labor Relations; License and Miscellany; Roads and Bridges
—N/a	—N/a	Phillip C. Goldstick	Democratic	1965	Member: Insurance; Judiciary; Public Utilities, Railroads and Aviation
—N/a	—N/a	Dorah Grow	Democratic	1965	Member: Appropriations; Education; Waterways, Conservation, Fish and Game
—N/a	—N/a	Albert W. Hachmeister	Republican	1953	
—N/a	—N/a	Thomas J. Hanahan	Democratic	1965	Member: Industry and Labor Relations; License and Miscellany; Roads and Bridges
—N/a	—N/a	Michael E. Hannigan	Democratic	1933	Member: Banks and Savings and Loan Associations; Insurance; Liquor Regulation (vice-chair)
—N/a	—N/a	Lloyd Harris	Democratic	1935	Member: Appropriations (chair); Municipalities; Personnel and Pensions; Rules
—N/a	—N/a	William E. Hartnett	Democratic	1965	Member: Education; Judiciary; Roads and Bridges
—N/a	—N/a	John Jerome Hill	Democratic	1959	Member: Executive; Industry and Labor Relations (vice-chair); Revenue
—N/a	—N/a	James D. Holloway	Democratic	1959	Member: Agriculture; Banks and Savings and Loan Associations; Public Utilities, Railroads and Aviation (vice-chair)
—N/a	—N/a	G. William Horsley	Republican	1947	Member: Appropriations; Education; Insurance; Rules
—N/a	—N/a	John J. Houlihan	Democratic	1965	Member: Industry and Labor Relations; Military and Veteran Affairs; Municipalities
—N/a	—N/a	Ronald Alan Hurst	Republican	1965	Member: Appropriations; License and Miscellany; Military and Veteran Affairs
—N/a	—N/a	Oral Jake Jacobs	Democratic	1965	Member: Industry and Labor Relations; License and Miscellany; Personnel and Pensions
—N/a	—N/a	Edward H. Jenison	Republican	1965	Member: Appropriations; Public Utilities, Railroads and Aviation; Waterways, Conservation, Fish and Game
—N/a	—N/a	Alan R. Johnston	Republican	1963	Member: Elections; Personnel and Pensions; Revenue
—N/a	—N/a	J. David Jones	Republican	1965	Member: Industry and Labor Relations; Military and Veteran Affairs; Public Utilities, Railroads and Aviation
—N/a	—N/a	Leslie N. Jones	Republican	1965	Member: Judiciary; Municipalities; Public Utilities, Railroads and Aviation; Reapportionment
—N/a	—N/a	Harold A. Katz	Democratic	1965	Member: Judiciary; Personnel and Pensions; Public Aid, Health, Welfare and Safety
—N/a	—N/a	John A. Kennedy	Democratic	1965	Member: Appropriations; Military and Veteran Affairs; Public Utilities, Railroads and Aviation
—N/a	—N/a	Leland J. Kennedy	Democratic	1945	Member: Industry and Labor Relations; License and Miscellany; Waterways, Conservation, Fish and Game (vice-chair)
—N/a	—N/a	James Kirie	Democratic	1965	Member: Appropriations; Insurance; Public Aid, Health, Welfare and Safety
—N/a	—N/a	Carl L. Klein	Republican	1965	Member: Banks and Savings and Loan Associations; Liquor Regulation; Waterways, Conservation, Fish and Game
—N/a	—N/a	John H. Kleine	Republican	1965	Member: Insurance; Motor Vehicles and Traffic Regulation; Public Aid, Health, Welfare and Safety
—N/a	—N/a	Jack T. Knuepfer	Republican	1965	Member: Executive; Industry and Labor Relations; Revenue
—N/a	—N/a	Clyde Lee	Democratic	1939	Member: Agriculture (chair); Appropriations; Education
—N/a	—N/a	Noble W. Lee	Republican	1941	Member: Judiciary; Municipalities; Personnel and Pensions; Rules
—N/a	—N/a	Ed Lehman	Republican	1963	Member: License and Miscellany; Liquor Regulation; Waterways, Conservation, Fish and Game
—N/a	—N/a	Henry M. Lenard	Democratic	1953	Member: Executive; License and Miscellany (vice-chair); Motor Vehicles and Traffic Regulation
—N/a	—N/a	John F. Leon	Democratic	1959	Member: Agriculture; Banks and Savings and Loan Associations; Liquor Regulation
—N/a	—N/a	John W. Lewis Jr.	Republican	1941	Member: Agriculture; License and Miscellany; Motor Vehicles and Traffic Regulation
—N/a	—N/a	Marvin S. Lieberman	Democratic	1965	Member: Education; Judiciary; Military and Veteran Affairs
—N/a	—N/a	Francis J. Loughran	Democratic	1955	Member: Judiciary; Public Utilities, Railroads and Aviation; Waterways, Conservation, Fish and Game
—N/a	—N/a	James P. Loukas	Democratic	1957	Member: Appropriations; Executive; Revenue (vice-chair)
—N/a	—N/a	Allen T. Lucas	Democratic	1955	Member: Executive; Insurance; Motor Vehicles and Traffic Regulation (chair); Rules
—N/a	—N/a	Frank Lyman	Democratic	1959	Member: Banks and Savings and Loan Associations; Municipalities; Roads and Bridges (vice-chair)
—N/a	—N/a	Francis X. Mahoney	Democratic	1965	Member: Insurance; Judiciary; License and Miscellany
—N/a	—N/a	Chester P. Majewski	Democratic	1963	Member: Education; Insurance; Revenue
—N/a	—N/a	Robert E. Mann	Democratic	1963	Member: Education; Judiciary; Roads and Bridges
—N/a	—N/a	C. L. McCormick	Republican	1957	Member: Agriculture; License and Miscellany; Motor Vehicles and Traffic Regulation
—N/a	—N/a	Hope Baldwin McCormick	Republican	1965	Member: Education; Elections; Public Aid, Health, Welfare and Safety
—N/a	—N/a	Dean McCully	Republican	1951	Member: Agriculture; Banks and Savings and Loan Associations; Enrolling, Transcribing and Typing of Bills; Revenue
—N/a	—N/a	Michael H. McDermott	Democratic	1955	Member: Banks and Savings and Loan Associations; Military and Veteran Affairs (chair); Municipalities
—N/a	—N/a	Bernard McDevitt	Republican	1957	Member: Judiciary; Public Utilities, Railroads and Aviation; Waterways, Conservation, Fish and Game
—N/a	—N/a	Elmo McClain	Democratic	1965	Member: Education; Industry and Labor Relations; Military and Veteran Affairs
—N/a	—N/a	James A. McLendon	Democratic	1965	Member: Judiciary; Military and Veteran Affairs; Public Aid, Health, Welfare and Safety
—N/a	—N/a	Melvin McNairy	Democratic	1965	Member: Elections; Public Aid, Health, Welfare and Safety; Waterways, Conservation, Fish and Game
—N/a	—N/a	John J. McNichols	Democratic	1965	Member: Judiciary; Military and Veteran Affairs; Revenue
—N/a	—N/a	Robert F. McPartlin	Democratic	1961	Member: Enrolling, Transcribing and Typing of Bills (vice-chair); Motor Vehicles and Traffic Regulation; Municipalities; Public Utilities, Railroads and Aviation
—N/a	—N/a	Mary K. Meany	Republican	1965	Member: Education; Elections; Roads and Bridges
—N/a	—N/a	John Merlo	Democratic	1963	Member: Banks and Savings and Loan Associations; Insurance; Revenue; Rules
—N/a	—N/a	Abner J. Mikva	Democratic	1957	Member: Executive; Judiciary (chair); Public Aid, Health, Welfare and Safety
—N/a	—N/a	Miles E. Mills	Democratic	1941	Member: Education; Personnel and Pensions (vice-chair); Public Utilities, Railroads and Aviation
—N/a	—N/a	Don A. Moore	Republican	1963	Member: Elections; License and Miscellany; Roads and Bridges
—N/a	—N/a	William A. Moore	Democratic	1959	Member: Appropriations; Military and Veteran Affairs; Public Aid, Health, Welfare and Safety
—N/a	—N/a	James Moran	Democratic	1965	Member: Judiciary; Public Aid, Health, Welfare and Safety; Waterways, Conservation, Fish and Game
—N/a	—N/a	Lewis V. Morgan	Republican	1963	Member: Executive; Insurance; Judiciary
—N/a	—N/a	John K. Morris	Democratic	1947	Member: Appropriations; Education; Revenue (chair)
—N/a	—N/a	Clarence E. Neff	Republican	1963	Member: Agriculture; Banks and Savings and Loan Associations; Executive
—N/a	—N/a	Leo B. Obernuefemann	Democratic	1965	Member: Agriculture; Motor Vehicles and Traffic Regulation; Municipalities
—N/a	—N/a	Leo F. O'Brien	Democratic	1965	Member: Banks and Savings and Loan Associations; Municipalities; Waterways, Conservation, Fish and Game
—N/a	—N/a	Daniel O'Neill	Democratic	1965	Member: Education; Judiciary; Waterways, Conservation, Fish and Game
—N/a	—N/a	James H. Oughton	Republican	1965	Member: Liquor Regulation; Motor Vehicles and Traffic Regulation; Waterways, Conservation, Fish and Game
—N/a	—N/a	Stanley A. Papierz	Republican	1965	Member: Banks and Savings and Loan Associations; License and Miscellany; Municipalities
—N/a	—N/a	John C. Parkhurst	Republican	1959	Member: Elections (chair); Insurance; Public Utilities, Railroads and Aviation; Reapportionment; Rules
—N/a	—N/a	Cecil A. Partee	Democratic	1957	Member: Education; Elections; Public Aid, Health, Welfare and Safety
—N/a	—N/a	Marjorie Pebworth	Republican	1965	Member: Banks and Savings and Loan Associations (chair); Executive; Public Aid, Health, Welfare and Safety; Reapportionment; Rules
—N/a	—N/a	Bernard M. Peskin	Democratic	1959	Member: Agriculture; Appropriations; Executive (chair); Reapportionment
—N/a	—N/a	Leo Pfeffer	Democratic	1953	Member: Elections; Public Utilities, Railroads and Aviation; Reapportionment; Waterways, Conservation, Fish and Game
—N/a	—N/a	Daniel M. Pierce	Democratic	1965	Member: Executive; Industry and Labor Relations (chair); Public Aid, Health, Welfare and Safety
—N/a	—N/a	William Pierce	Democratic	1951	Member: Appropriations; Executive; Waterways, Conservation, Fish and Game
—N/a	—N/a	William E. Pollack	Republican	1951	Member: Appropriations; Executive; Waterways, Conservation, Fish and Game
—N/a	—N/a	Lawrence X. Pusateri	Republican	1965	Member: Banks and Savings and Loan Associations; Executive; Reapportionment; Roads and Bridges
—N/a	—N/a	Thomas F. Railsback	Republican	1963	Member: Education; Judiciary; Military and Veteran Affairs
—N/a	—N/a	Paul J. Randolph	Republican	1945	Member: Banks and Savings and Loan Associations; Insurance; Revenue
—N/a	—N/a	Butch Ratcliffe	Democratic	1947	Member: Motor Vehicles and Traffic Regulation; Public Utilities, Railroads and Aviation; Waterways, Conservation, Fish and Game (chair)
—N/a	—N/a	Leland Rayson	Democratic	1965	Member: Industry and Labor Relations; Public Utilities, Railroads and Aviation; Waterways, Conservation, Fish and Game
—N/a	—N/a	William A. Redmond	Democratic	1959	Member: Judiciary (vice-chair); Municipalities; Roads and Bridges
—N/a	—N/a	Ben S. Rhodes	Republican	1939	Member: Contingent Expenses; Elections; Liquor Regulation; Personnel and Pensions
—N/a	—N/a	Paul E. Rink	Democratic	1957	Member: Agriculture; Judiciary; Public Utilities, Railroads and Aviation
—N/a	—N/a	Sam Romano	Democratic	1955	Member: Elections; Municipalities; Personnel and Pensions (chair)
—N/a	—N/a	Matt Ropa	Democratic	1959	Member: Banks and Savings and Loan Associations; Contingent Expenses; Executive; Insurance
—N/a	—N/a	Harris Rowe	Republican	1961	Member: Elections; Executive; Insurance
—N/a	—N/a	Michael A. Ruddy	Republican	1929	Member: Banks and Savings and Loan Associations; Liquor Regulation; Public Utilities, Railroads and Aviation
—N/a	—N/a	Joe W. Russell	Democratic	1933	Member: Agriculture; Appropriations; Contingent Expenses (vice-chair); Public Utilities, Railroads and Aviation
—N/a	—N/a	Omer Sanders	Democratic	1965	Member: License and Miscellany; Military and Veteran Affairs; Motor Vehicles and Traffic Regulation
—N/a	—N/a	Esther Saperstein	Democratic	1957	Member: Appropriations; Education; Public Aid, Health, Welfare and Safety (vice-chair)
—N/a	—N/a	Anthony Scariano	Democratic	1957	Member: Appropriations; Education (chair); Revenue
—N/a	—N/a	Charles Ed Schaefer	Democratic	1947	Member: Appropriations; Contingent Expenses (chair); Revenue; Waterways, Conservation, Fish and Game
—N/a	—N/a	Eugene F. Schlickman	Republican	1965	Member: Insurance; Judiciary; Municipalities
—N/a	—N/a	William J. Schoeninger	Democratic	1965	Member: Elections; Revenue; Waterways, Conservation, Fish and Game
—N/a	—N/a	Fred J. Schraeder	Democratic	1965	Member: Industry and Labor Relations; Liquor Regulation; Personnel and Pensions
—N/a	—N/a	J. W. Scott	Democratic	1957	Member: Appropriations; Municipalities (vice-chair); Revenue
—N/a	—N/a	Edward F. Sensor	Democratic	1965	Member: Motor Vehicles and Traffic Regulation; Personnel and Pensions; Revenue
—N/a	—N/a	Edward J. Shaw	Democratic	1955	Member: Banks and Savings and Loan Associations; License and Miscellany; Liquor Regulation
—N/a	—N/a	Arthur E. Simmons	Republican	1957	Member: Industry and Labor Relations; Municipalities; Public Utilities, Railroads and Aviation
—N/a	—N/a	George F. Sisler	Republican	1965	Member: Banks and Savings and Loan Associations; Personnel and Pensions; Public Utilities, Railroads and Aviation
—N/a	—N/a	Howard R. Slater	Democratic	1965	Member: Appropriations; Revenue; Roads and Bridges
—N/a	—N/a	Roy Curtis Small	Democratic	1965	Member: Executive; Motor Vehicles and Traffic Regulation; Public Aid, Health, Welfare and Safety
—N/a	—N/a	Calvin L. Smith	Democratic	1965	Member: Elections; Liquor Regulation; Personnel and Pensions
—N/a	—N/a	Frank J. Smith	Democratic	1953	Member: Banks and Savings and Loan Associations; Executive; Insurance
—N/a	—N/a	Ralph T. Smith	Republican	1955	Member: Military and Veteran Affairs; Motor Vehicles and Traffic Regulation; Revenue
—N/a	—N/a	Carl W. Soderstrom	Republican	1951	Member: Agriculture; Judiciary; Liquor Regulation
—N/a	—N/a	Harold D. Stedelin	Democratic	1965	Member: Elections; Public Utilities, Railroads and Aviation; Waterways, Conservation, Fish and Game
—N/a	—N/a	Adlai E. Stevenson III	Democratic	1965	Member: Judiciary; Public Aid, Health, Welfare and Safety; Waterways, Conservation, Fish and Game
—N/a	—N/a	Joseph P. Stremlau	Democratic	1949	Member: Appropriations; Liquor Regulation; Roads and Bridges (chair)
—N/a	—N/a	Nick Svalina	Democratic	1957	Member: License and Miscellany; Military and Veteran Affairs (vice-chair); Municipalities
—N/a	—N/a	H. B. Tanner	Democratic	1965	Member: Agriculture; License and Miscellany; Motor Vehicles and Traffic Regulation
—N/a	—N/a	Dan Teefey	Democratic	1961	Member: Agriculture (vice-chair); Elections; Public Utilities, Railroads and Aviation
—N/a	—N/a	George Thiem	Republican	1965	Member: Agriculture; Appropriations; Revenue
—N/a	—N/a	John P. Touhy	Democratic	1949	Member: Reapportionment (chair); Rules (chair)
—N/a	—N/a	Joseph Tumpach	Democratic	1965	Member: Elections; Personnel and Pensions; Public Utilities, Railroads and Aviation
—N/a	—N/a	John Vitek	Democratic	1961	Member: Banks and Savings and Loan Associations; Executive; Roads and Bridges
—N/a	—N/a	James Von Boeckman	Democratic	1965	Member: Industry and Labor Relations; License and Miscellany; Waterways, Conservation, Fish and Game
—N/a	—N/a	Richard A. Walsh	Republican	1963	Member: Appropriations; Executive; Revenue
—N/a	—N/a	Robert V. Walsh	Democratic	1963	Member: Agriculture; Liquor Regulation; Motor Vehicles and Traffic Regulation
—N/a	—N/a	William D. Walsh	Republican	1961	Member: Education; Elections; Public Aid, Health, Welfare and Safety
—N/a	—N/a	Edward A. Warman	Democratic	1965	Member: Elections; Municipalities; Waterways, Conservation, Fish and Game
—N/a	—N/a	Harold Washington	Democratic	1965	Member: Executive; Judiciary; Personnel and Pensions
—N/a	—N/a	Raymond J. Welsh Jr.	Democratic	1957	Member: Banks and Savings and Loan Associations; Municipalities (chair); Public Utilities, Railroads and Aviation
—N/a	—N/a	Peter J. Whalen	Democratic	1957	Member: Banks and Savings and Loan Associations; License and Miscellany; Liquor Regulation
—N/a	—N/a	Chester R. Wiktorski Jr.	Democratic	1957	Member: Appropriations; Education; Insurance
—N/a	—N/a	Carl H. Wittmond	Democratic	1955	Member: Agriculture; Banks and Savings and Loan Associations (vice-chair); License and Miscellany
—N/a	—N/a	Edward W. Wolbank	Democratic	1963	Member: Elections; Public Utilities, Railroads and Aviation; Roads and Bridges
—N/a	—N/a	Frank C. Wolf	Democratic	1953	Member: Enrolling, Transcribing and Typing of Bills (chair); Executive; Motor Vehicles and Traffic Regulation; Public Utilities, Railroads and Aviation
—N/a	—N/a	Bernard B. Wolfe	Democratic	1965	Member: Judiciary; Liquor Regulation; Personnel and Pensions
—N/a	—N/a	Robert M. Woodward	Republican	1931	Member: Judiciary; License and Miscellany; Military and Veteran Affairs
—N/a	—N/a	John Clinton Youle	Republican	1965	Member: Banks and Savings and Loan Associations; Education; Reapportionment; Roads and Bridges
—N/a	—N/a	Nicholas Zagone	Democratic	1959	Member: Education; Insurance; Judiciary

== Works cited ==
- Paul Powell, Illinois Secretary of State (1965). Illinois Blue Book, 1965-1966.
- William J. Stratton, Illinois Secretary of State (1931). Illinois Blue Book, 1931--1932.
- Blue Book of the State of Illinois - Illinois Legislative Roster — 1818-2021 (PDF). 2021.
