= Terry L. Bruce =

American politician (1944–2026)

Terry Bruce
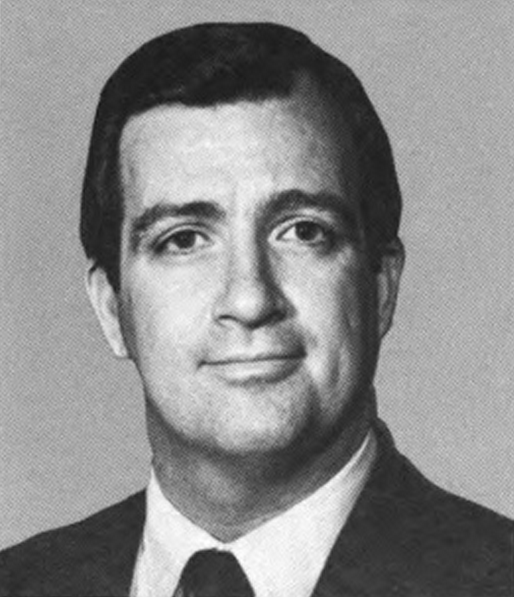

Member of the U.S. House of Representatives from Illinois's 19th district
- In office January 3, 1985 – January 3, 1993
- Preceded by: Dan Crane
- Succeeded by: Glenn Poshard

Member of the Illinois Senate
- In office January 3, 1971 – January 3, 1985
- Preceded by: Paul W. Broyles
- Succeeded by: William L. O'Daniel
- Constituency: 55th district (1971–1973); 54th district (1973–1985)

Personal details
- Born: Terry Lee Bruce; March 25, 1944 Olney, Illinois, U.S.
- Died: April 17, 2026 (aged 82) Springfield, Illinois, U.S.
- Party: Democratic
- Spouse: Charlotte Bruce
- Children: 2
- Education: University of Illinois, Urbana-Champaign (BA, JD)

Terry Lee Bruce (March 25, 1944 – April 17, 2026) was an American politician, lawyer, and educator from Illinois.

== Early life ==
Bruce was born in Olney, Illinois, on March 25, 1944. He attended the University of Illinois at Urbana-Champaign and then later the University of Illinois College of Law. He worked for a time at the United States Department of Labor on issues related to farmworkers and as an intern on the staff of Tom McGloon. He also worked on the staffs of Congressman George Shipley and State Senator Philip Benefiel.

He was admitted to the bar in 1969. When he announced his candidacy for the Illinois Senate in November 1969, he was occupied as an attorney in Olney, Illinois.

== Illinois Senate ==
Bruce's initial election to the Illinois Senate representing the 55th District in 1971 was in part made possible by the retirement of the incumbent, Paul W. Broyles. In 1972, the incumbent Bruce faced a challenge from Henry Hendren for representation of the 54th district.

While in the Senate, he was a leader of the Democratic Study Group which he jokingly termed the "Crazy 8". In 1977, Bruce ran against Thomas Hynes to succeed Cecil Partee as President of the Illinois Senate. After 186 ballots, Hynes was victorious over the other Democratic faction and the Republican caucus.

Bruce served as member of the Illinois Senate from 1971 to 1984 and assistant majority leader from 1975 to 1984. In 1981, Bruce was among those who opposed an "eleventh-hour action", ultimately accepted, to increase Illinois General Assembly compensation. Bruce resigned from the Illinois Senate effective January 3, 1985. Local Democratic leaders appointed former state legislator William L. O'Daniel to the vacancy created by Bruce's resignation.

== U.S. Congress ==
In 1977, Democratic incumbent George E. Shipley chose to retire after ten terms in the United States House of Representatives rather than run in the 1978 election. Bruce defeated Don Watson, Shipley's brother-in-law, for the Democratic nomination to succeed Shipley in Illinois's 22nd congressional district. Subsequently, in the general election there was an apathy towards Bruce's candidacy. Republican candidate Dan Crane, the brother of Chicago-area Congressman Phil Crane, was able to win several Democratic strongholds in the 22nd and the election.

On July 14, 1983, the House Ethics Committee recommended that Crane be reprimanded for having engaged in a sexual relationship with a 17-year-old female House page. In the 1984 election, Bruce defeated Crane.

Bruce was elected to the Ninety-ninth and to the three succeeding Congresses and represented Illinois's 19th congressional district from January 3, 1985 to January 3, 1993. He was unsuccessful for renomination in 1992, losing the primary to fellow incumbent Glenn Poshard when their districts were effectively merged in redistricting.

== Community college career ==
From 1996 to 2019 Bruce served as the chief executive officer of Illinois Eastern Community Colleges (IECC). Governor Pat Quinn appointed him to the Illinois Community College Board (ICCB) in September 2012. He replaced former ICCB member Dianne Meeks. His term expired on June 30, 2021. He at one point served as Vice Chairman of the board. Bruce was appointed again to the ICCB by Governor Bruce Rauner from March 20, 2015 until June 30, 2015 to succeed Rodolfo Valdez.

== Personal life and death ==
A resident of Olney, Illinois, Bruce was married to Charlotte (1944–2024) until her death. They have two daughters, Emily and Ellen.

Bruce died in Springfield, Illinois on April 17, 2026, at the age of 82.

Illinois Senate
Preceded by Paul W. Broyles	Member of the Illinois Senate from the 55th district 1971–1973	Succeeded by James Donnewald
Preceded by Kenneth Hall	Member of the Illinois Senate from the 54th district 1973–1985	Succeeded by William L. O'Daniel
U.S. House of Representatives
Preceded by Dan Crane	Member of the U.S. House of Representatives from Illinois's 19th congressional district 1985–1993	Succeeded by Glenn Poshard
