= Bert Baker (Illinois politician) =

American politician

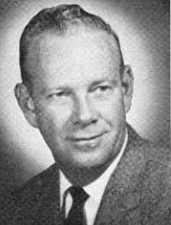

Member of the Illinois House of Representatives
- In office 1955–1967

Personal details
- Born: May 21, 1923
- Died: March 16, 1984 (age 60)
- Party: Democratic

Bert Baker was an American politician who served as a member of the Illinois House of Representatives serving from 1955 to 1967.

== Biography ==
Baker served as a state representative in the 50th District in the 69th Illinois General Assembly; in the 57th District in the 70th, 71st, 72nd, and 73rd Illinois General Assembly; and in the 74th Illinois General Assembly when all representatives were elected at-large.

Baker died on March 16, 1984.
