= James Donnewald =

American politician

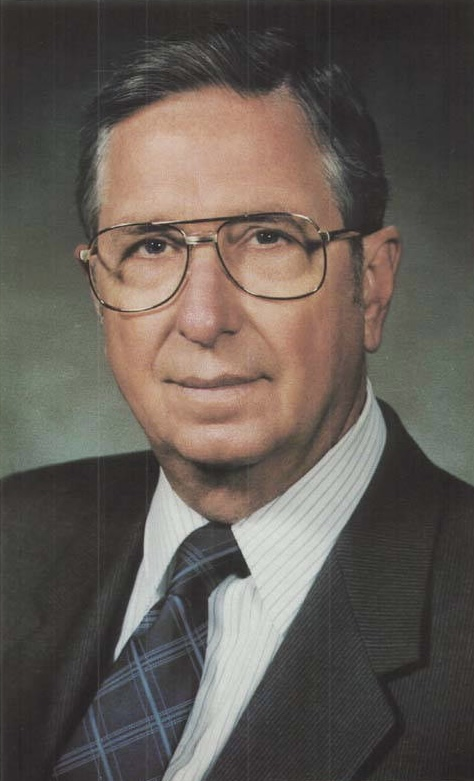
- Donnewald, circa 1983

68th Treasurer of Illinois
- In office January 10, 1983 – January 12, 1987
- Governor: Jim Thompson
- Preceded by: Jerome Cosentino
- Succeeded by: Jerome Cosentino

Personal details
- Born: January 29, 1925 Carlyle, Illinois, U.S.
- Died: September 18, 2009 (aged 84) St. Louis, Missouri, U.S.
- Party: Democratic
- Spouse: Ruth Evelyn Holtgrave
- Education: Saint Louis University; Lincoln College of Law

James H. Donnewald (January 29, 1925 – September 18, 2009) was an American politician from the state of Illinois. He was a Democrat who served as state Treasurer from 1983 until 1987.

== Early life and career ==
James H. Donnewald was born in Carlyle, Illinois on January 29, 1925. His family moved to Joliet, Illinois when he was in sixth grade, but returned to Carlyle his final year of high school. He entered Saint Louis University in 1942 and transferred to Lincoln College of Law in Springfield, Illinois in 1944. Donnewald joined the United States Army after the start of the Korean War and was honorably discharged in 1951. Donnewald began the practice of law in 1952. In 1948, Donnewald was elected as a Democratic precinct committeeman. He was elected as a Carlyle Township Supervisor in 1949 where he would serve until 1951. He served as the City Attorney of Breese, Illinois in 1956.

== Political career ==
He was elected to the Illinois House of Representatives in 1960 and re-elected in 1962. He was subsequently elected to the state Senate in 1964. During his tenure, he would serve as the assistant Senate majority leader. In 1982, he was elected as the state Treasurer. Despite the support for his reelection in 1986 by the Illinois Democratic Central Committee, including U.S. Senator Alan Dixon, Thom Serafin, and William Griffin, he was defeated by Jerome Cosentino, who was also his predecessor. He left office in 1987 and retired from elective politics.

== Death ==
Donnewald died on September 18, 2009, at Barnes-Jewish Hospital in St. Louis, Missouri. He was 84.

== Notes ==
Party political offices
Preceded by Jerome Cosentino	Democratic nominee for Treasurer of Illinois; 1982	Succeeded by Jerome Cosentino
Illinois House of Representatives
Preceded by Edwin R. Haag; Warren Billhartz	Member of the Illinois House of Representatives from the 55th district 1961–1965; Served alongside: Miles E. Mills, Fred Branson	Succeeded by At-large district created
Illinois Senate
Preceded by Dwight Friedrich	Member of the Illinois Senate from the 42nd district 1965–1967	Succeeded by Richard R. Larson
Preceded by Gordon E. Kerr	Member of the Illinois Senate from the 51st district 1967–1973	Succeeded by Robert W. McCarthy
Preceded by Terry L. Bruce	Member of the Illinois Senate from the 55th district 1973–1983	Succeeded by Frank Watson
Political offices
Preceded by Jerome Cosentino	Treasurer of Illinois; 1983–1987	Succeeded by Jerome Cosentino
