= John W. Alsup =

American politician

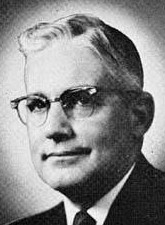

Member of the Illinois House of Representatives
- In office 1959–1975

Personal details
- Born: 1912 Austin Township, Macon County, Illinois
- Died: November 9, 1981 (age 68)
- Party: Democratic

John W. Alsup (1912 – November 9, 1981) was an American politician who served as a member of the Illinois House of Representatives serving from 1959 to 1975.

== Biography ==
Alsup served as a state representative in the 47th District in the 71st, 72nd, and 73rd Illinois General Assemblies; in the 74th Illinois General Assembly when all representatives were elected at-large; in the 52nd District in the 75th, 76th, and 77th Illinois General Assemblies; and in the 51st District in the 78th Illinois General Assembly.

Alsup died on November 9, 1981.
