= Senator Jacobs =

Senator Jacobs may refer to:

- Denny Jacobs (born 1937), Illinois State Senate
- Gilda Jacobs (born 1949), Michigan State Senate
- John C. Jacobs (1838–1894), New York State Senate
- Michael A. Jacobs (1860–1936), Wisconsin State Senate
- Mike Jacobs (Illinois politician) (born 1960), Illinois State Senate
- Nancy Jacobs (born 1951), Maryland State Senate
- Paul Jacobs (politician) (fl. 2020s), Illinois State Senate
- William H. Jacobs (1831–1882), Wisconsin State Senate

== See also ==
- Ken Jacob (born 1949), Missouri State Senate
