= Carl Schurz High School =

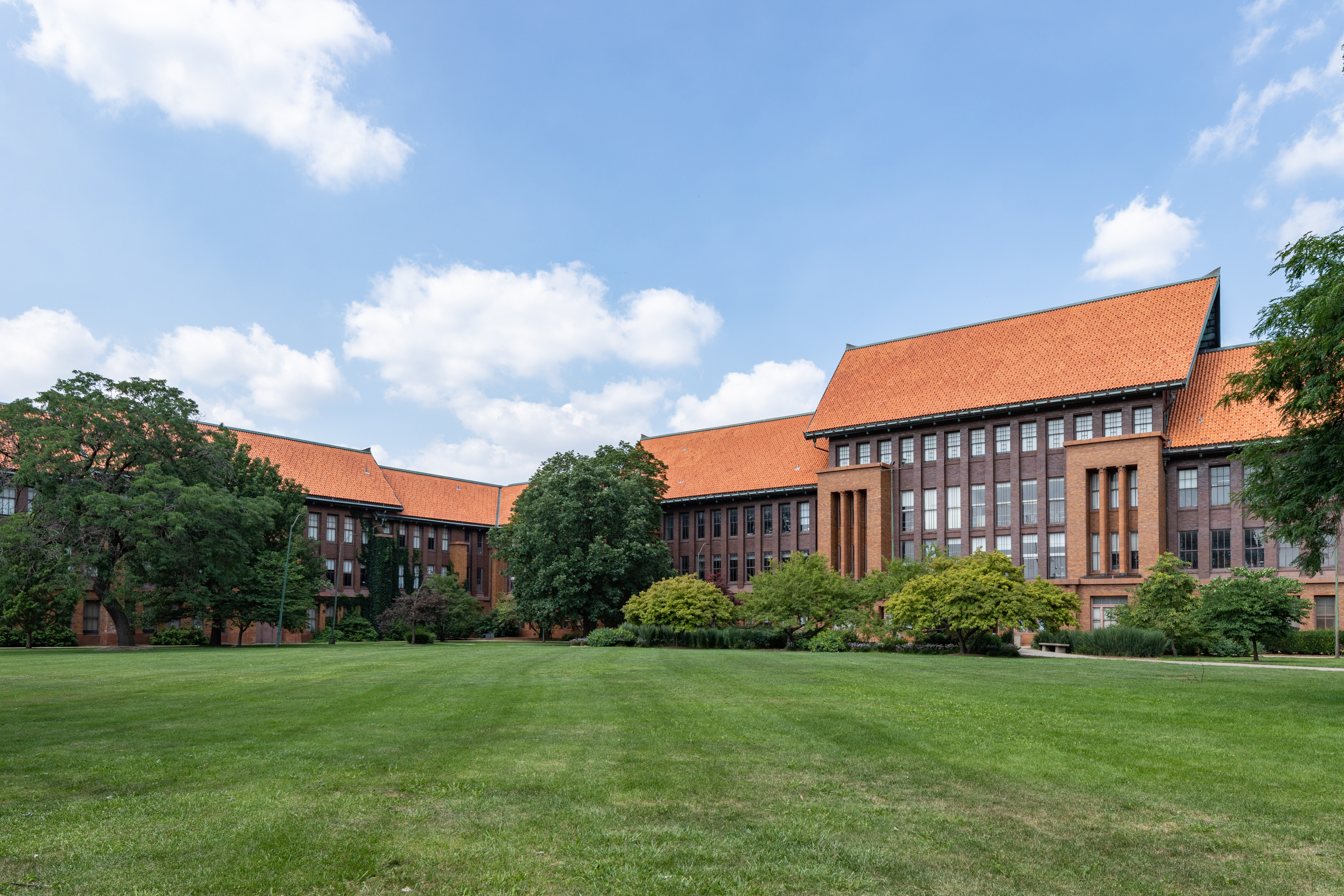

Location
- 3601 N. Milwaukee Avenue; Chicago, Illinois 60641; United States; 41.9474°N 87.7355°W

Information
- School type: Public Secondary
- Motto: A block long and a world wide.
- Opened: 1910
- School district: Chicago Public Schools
- CEEB code: 140700
- Principal: Dr. Heidy Moran
- Teaching staff: 100.00 (FTE)
- Grades: 9–12
- Gender: Coed
- Enrollment: 1,407 (2022-23)
- Student to teacher ratio: 14.07
- Campus type: Urban
- Colors: Purple; Gold
- Athletics conference: Chicago Public League
- Team name: Bulldogs
- Accreditation: North Central Association of Colleges and Schools
- Yearbook: Schurzone
- Nobel laureates: Vincent du Vigneaud (1955 Chemistry); Harry Markowitz (1990 Economics)
- Website: schurzhs.org
- Carl Schurz High School
- U.S. National Register of Historic Places
- Location: 3601 N Milwaukee Ave. Chicago
- NRHP reference No.: 11000031
- Added to NRHP: February 22, 2011

Carl Schurz High School is a public four-year high school located in the Irving Park neighborhood on the northwest side of Chicago, Illinois, United States. The school is named after German–American Carl Schurz, a statesman, soldier, and advocate of democracy in Germany. The school building, which represents a combination of the Chicago and Prairie schools of architecture, was designed in 1910 by Dwight H. Perkins and designated a Chicago Landmark on December 7, 1979. It is considered one of "150 great places in Illinois" by the American Institute of Architects. The AIA has described the school as Perkins's masterpiece, "an important example of early-twentieth century architecture, utilizing elements of both the Chicago and Prairie schools." In celebration of the 2018 Illinois Bicentennial, Carl Schurz High School was selected as one of the Illinois 200 Great Places by the American Institute of Architects Illinois component (AIA Illinois).

== History ==
The land upon which the current school is built was purchased in 1908, and is about two blocks south of an older building which was also Carl Schurz High School (located at 2338 N. 41st Court). The final site was approved in October 1908, with an estimated US$500,000 construction cost. Shortly after the school's opening, Carl Schurz's son donated a picture of his father and copies of his father's two published works to the school. The school was formally dedicated on the evening of 18 November 1910, with a presentation of a bust of the school's namesake. Able to accommodate 1,400 students, the building included an assembly hall, gymnasium, foundry, forge, a physiographical lab, and lunchroom.

Schurz High School has a twin on the south side of Chicago. Bowen High School at 2710 E. 89th st. was built using the same design.

== Athletics ==
Schurz competes in the Chicago Public League (CPL) and is a member of the Illinois High School Association (IHSA); the organization that governs most athletic and competitive activities in the state. Teams are stylized as the Bulldogs. The following teams finished in the top four of their IHSA sponsored state championship tournament:

- Baseball: state champions (1954–55, 1968–69)
- Cross country (boys): 4th place (1947–48)
- Soccer (boys): 2nd place (1977–78)
- Swimming and diving (boys): 3rd place (1946–47)

== Notable alumni ==
- Hadley Arkes is a political author and professor.
- Camila Ashland, actress (real name Camille Stanczewski), class of 1928
- Sybil Bauer was a swimmer who set 23 world records in her career. She won the first ever Olympic gold medal contested in the women's backstroke at the 1924 Summer Olympics.
- John William Chapman served as Lieutenant Governor of Illinois (1953–61).
- Rey Colón, alderman of the 35th ward of the City of Chicago
- Bill Conterio was a soccer player who played professionally in the National Soccer League of Chicago, and played for the United States men's national soccer team at the 1952 and 1956 Olympics.
- Ruth Cruz, alderwoman of the 30th ward of the City of Chicago
- David Diaz is a boxer who held the WBC world lightweight championship (2006–08).
- Adolph Dubs was the United States Ambassador to Afghanistan (1978–79). He was assassinated there, and was not replaced until 2002.
- Bruce DuMont is the host of the political radio talk show Beyond the Beltway. He also founded the Museum of Broadcast Communications.
- Vincent du Vigneaud was a biochemist who won the 1955 Nobel Prize in Chemistry for his work in the isolation, identification, and synthesis of oxytocin.
- Ed Earle played basketball for the Syracuse Nationals of the NBL (1953–54).
- Moe Franklin was a Major League Baseball player.
- Leo Freisinger was a speed skater who won a bronze medal in the 500m event at the 1936 Winter Olympics.
- Myrna Hansen was an actress who won the titles of Miss Illinois USA 1953 and Miss USA 1953.
- Sheldon Harnick is a Pulitzer Prize–winning lyricist (Fiorello!, Fiddler on the Roof).
- Walter Hoffelder was an Illinois state legislator and businessman.
- Emerson C. Itschner was an engineer who served in the United States Army, rising to the rank of Lieutenant General, leading the Army Corps of Engineers as Chief of Engineers (1956–61).
- Donald Johanson is a paleoanthropologist best known for his 1974 discovery of the fossil Lucy.
- Luke Johnsos was an NFL end (1929–36), playing his entire career for the Chicago Bears. From 1942–45, he shared head coaching duties for the Bears.
- David M. Maddox is a former four–star general who served as Commander in Chief, United States Army Europe (1992–94).
- Harry Markowitz is an economist who won the 1990 Nobel Prize in Economics for his work in Modern Portfolio Theory.
- Terrence McCann was a wrestler who won a gold medal in freestyle wrestling at the 1960 Olympics. He would go on to help found USA Wrestling, the national governing body for freestyle and Greco-Roman wrestling.
- George E. McNally was a city official and briefly the 87th Mayor of Mobile, Alabama.
- William S. Paley was a radio, recording industry, and television executive who built the Columbia Broadcasting System (CBS) into a national broadcasting and recording power.
- Abram Nicholas Pritzker was a businessman and philanthropist who was instrumental in founding the Hyatt Corporation and Marmon Group and member of the Pritzker family.
- Lenny Sachs was a pro football player and Loyola basketball coach. He was a 1961 inductee in the Basketball Hall of Fame.
- Vic Schwall was an NFL running back (1947–50) selected in the first round of the 1947 NFL draft. He played his entire career for the Chicago Cardinals, and was a member of their 1947 NFL Championship team.
- Ken Silvestri was a Major League Baseball catcher (1939–41, 1946–47, 1950–51), who later coached and briefly managed the Atlanta Braves (1967).
- Don Stonesifer was an NFL wide receiver (1951–56) playing his entire career for the Chicago Cardinals.
- Gene Sullivan was the head basketball coach at Loyola University and was the athletic director at Loyola and DePaul University.
- Norm Swanson briefly played with the NBA Rochester Royals.
- Stan Szukala, NBL player for the Chicago Bruins and Chicago American Gears.
- Waid Vanderpoel was the Chief Investment Officer of the First National Bank of Chicago and the two–time president of Citizens for Conservation.
- Thaddeus Weclew was a co–founder of the Academy of General Dentistry.
- Alvin Wistert was a collegiate tackle for the University of Michigan. He is the oldest football player ever to be named an All-American. He and his brothers Francis and Albert all have their uniform numbers retired at the University of Michigan, and are all in the College Football Hall of Fame.
- Whitey Wistert was a collegiate tackle for the University of Michigan who briefly pitched for Major League Baseball's Cincinnati Reds. He is a member of the College Football Hall of Fame.
- Richie Woit was an NFL defensive back (1955), playing his entire career for the Detroit Lions.
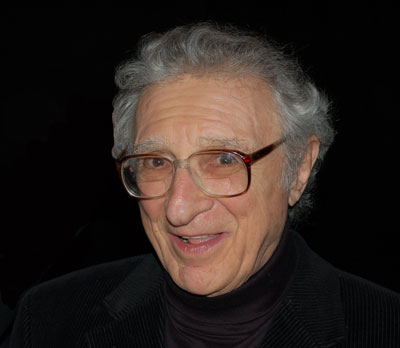
Sheldon Harnick

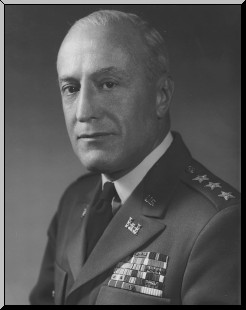
Lt. General Emerson C. Itschner

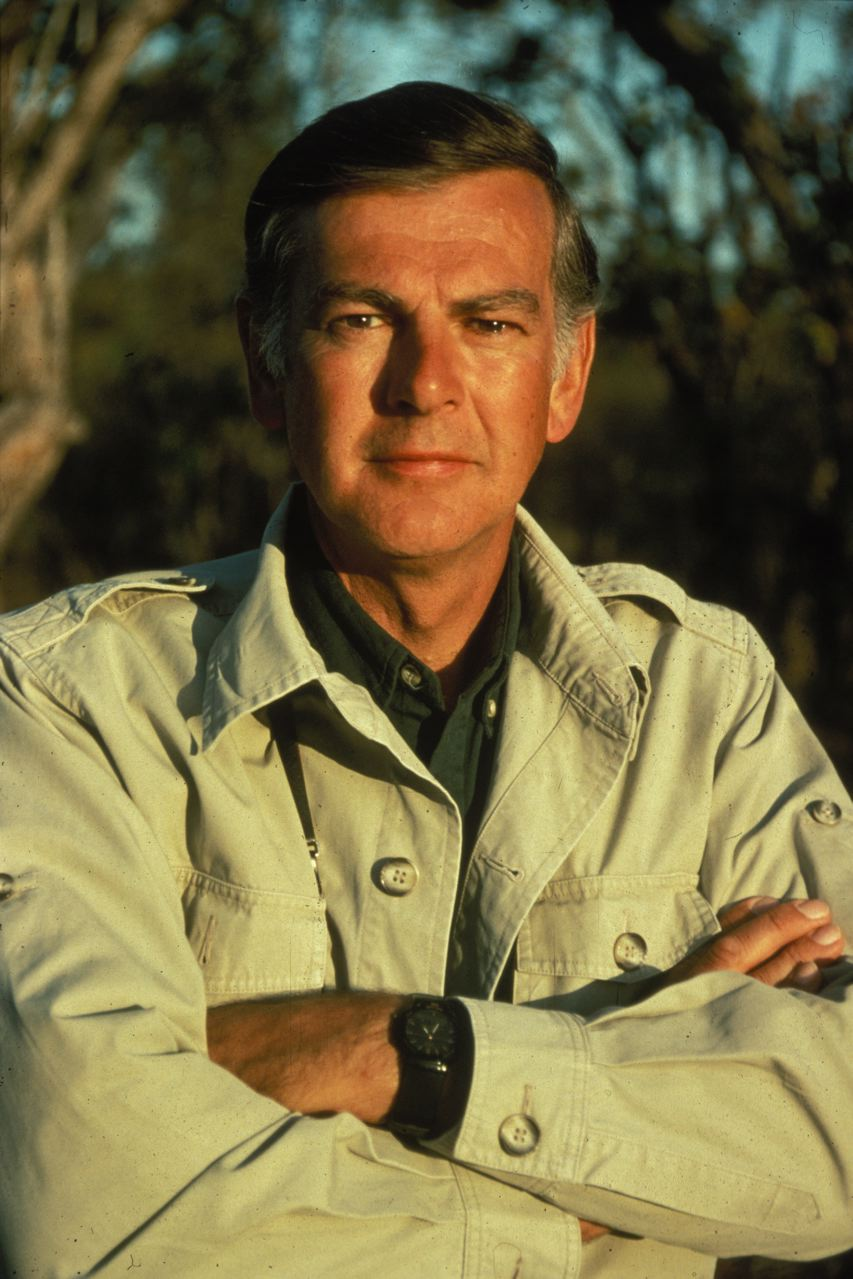
Donald C. Johanson

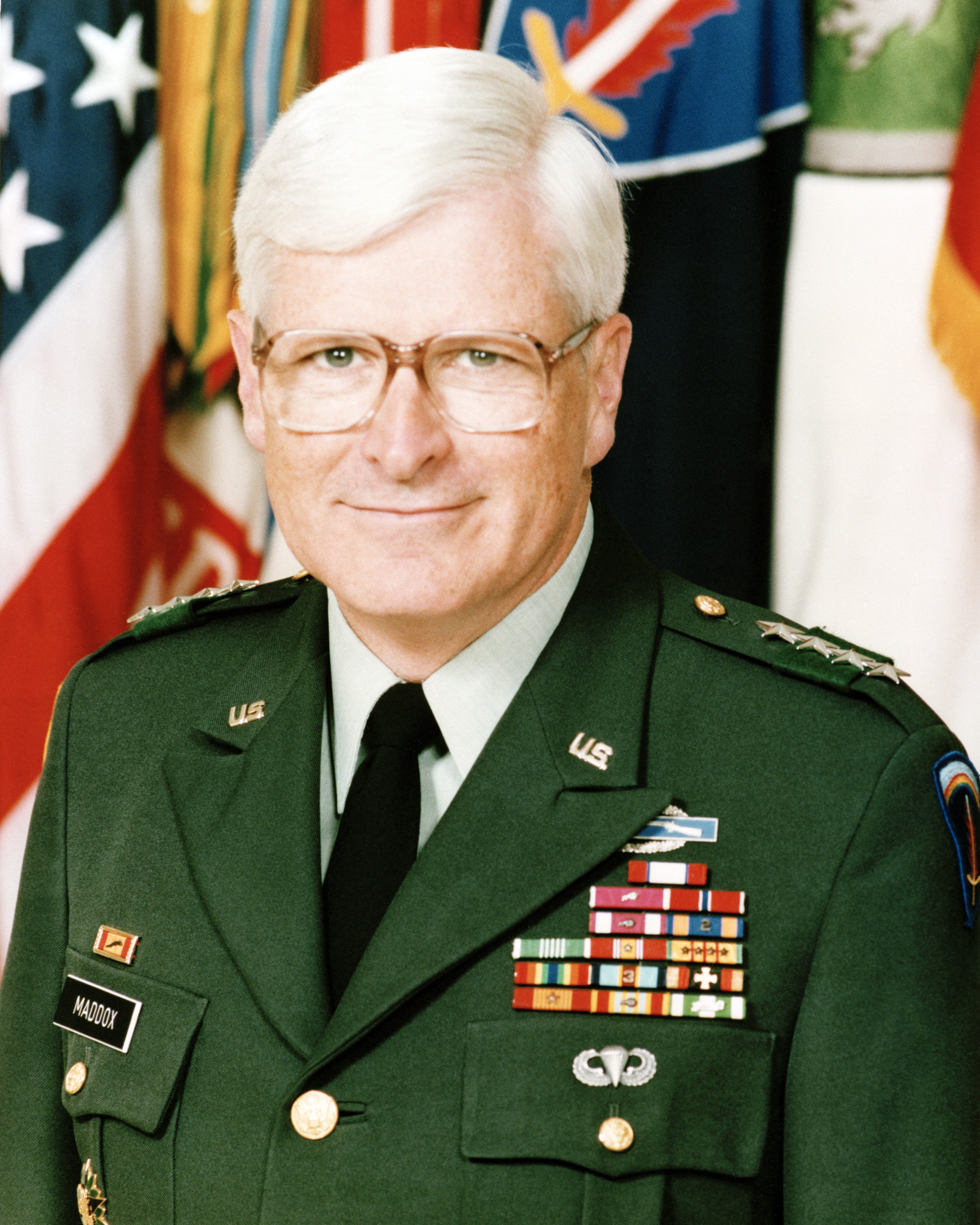
General David M. Maddox
