= Senator Roe =

Senator Roe may refer to:

- Dudley Roe (1881–1970), Maryland State Senate
- John B. Roe (born 1942), Illinois State Senate
