= Philip J. Rock =

American lawyer

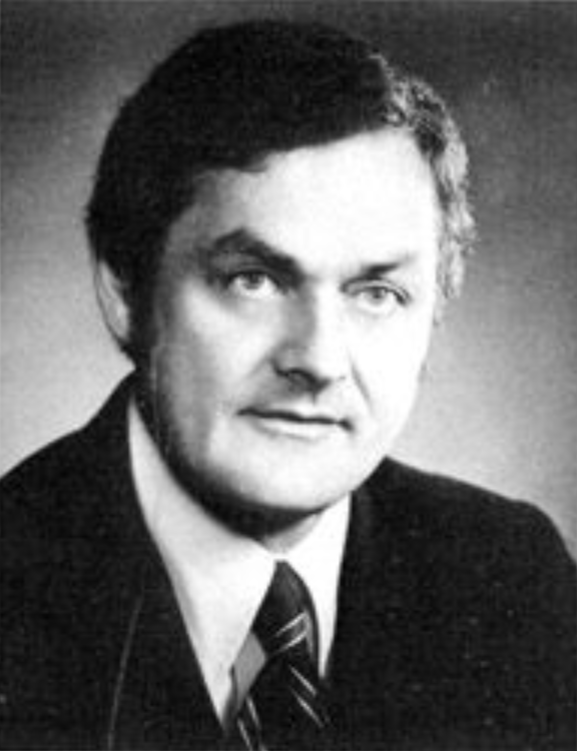
- Official portrait, circa. 1979

President of the Illinois Senate
- In office January 1979 – January 1993
- Preceded by: Thomas Hynes
- Succeeded by: James "Pate" Philip

Member of the Illinois Senate from the 8th district
- In office January 1971 – January 1993
- Preceded by: Thomas A. McGloon
- Succeeded by: Howard Carroll (redistricted)

Personal details
- Born: May 4, 1937 Chicago, Illinois, U.S.
- Died: January 29, 2016 (aged 78) Chicago, Illinois, U.S.
- Party: Democratic
- Spouse: Sheila Graber
- Children: 4
- Education: University of Saint Mary of the Lake; Loyola Universityl
- Profession: Attorney

Philip J. Rock (May 4, 1937 – January 29, 2016) was an American politician, and a long time Democratic member of the Illinois Senate who represented parts of the West Side of Chicago and Oak Park. During his time in the Senate, he became the longest serving President of the Illinois Senate with a fourteen-year tenure serving from 1979 to 1993.

== Early life and career ==
Rock was born on May 4, 1937, and raised in Logan Square, Chicago. He received both his bachelor's degree in philosophy and his master's degree in theology from the University of Saint Mary of the Lake, and in 1964 graduated from Loyola University School of Law. He served as an Assistant Attorney General under William G. Clark from 1965 until 1969 when he went to work for the Cook County State's Attorney.

== Illinois Senate ==
Rock was elected to the Illinois Senate in 1970 to succeed Thomas A. McGloon, who ran for and won a judgeship. After one term, he was named assistant minority leader and after the Democrats won back the Senate during a Democratic wave year in 1974, assistant majority leader. During his time in the Senate, the Illinois Deaf-Blind Service Center and School was established and the Regional Transportation Authority was created.

In 1979, Rock became President of the Illinois State Senate. After the 1991 decennial redistricting, the district that numerically was the 8th was represented by north side legislator Howard W. Carroll while his district was divided between several other districts.

== Post political-career ==
In 1996, Rock was appointed to the Illinois Board of Higher Education and became its chair in April 1999. He stepped down from the board in April 2002.

In 2012, Rock published his autobiography, Nobody Calls Just to Say Hello, co-authored with Ed Wojcicki.

== Death ==
On January 29, 2016, he died at the age of 78. At the time of his death, he had Lewy body dementia.
