= James Clayborne Jr. =

American politician

James Clayborne

Majority Leader of Illinois Senate
- In office January 3, 2009 – January 9, 2019
- Preceded by: Debbie Halvorson
- Succeeded by: Kimberly A. Lightford

Member of the Illinois Senate from the 57th district
- In office April 1995 – January 9, 2019
- Preceded by: Kenneth Hall
- Succeeded by: Christopher Belt

Personal details
- Born: December 29, 1963 (age 62) St. Louis, Missouri, U.S.
- Party: Democratic
- Spouse: Staci Clayborne
- Children: 4
- Education: Tennessee State University (BA); University of Miami (JD)

James Clayborne Jr. (born December 29, 1963) was a member of the Illinois Senate representing the 57th District from his appointment in 1995 until 2019. The 57th District, located in the Metro East region includes all or parts of Freeburg, Belleville, East St. Louis, O'Fallon, Madison, Fairview Heights, Shiloh and Scott Air Force Base.

At the time of his retirement, Clayborne was the second highest-ranking member of the Illinois Senate as the Senate Majority Leader. On September 21, 2017, Clayborne announced he would not run for reelection in 2018. He was succeeded by Christopher Belt.

== Early life and career ==
Senator Clayborne was born and raised in East St. Louis. After graduating from East St. Louis High School, he earned a Bachelor of Science from Tennessee State University and later a law degree from the University of Miami. While at the University of Miami, he met his future wife Staci, with whom he now has four sons.

He went on to serve as an assistant state’s attorney in St. Clair County as well as a child support prosecutor, a supervisor in the St. Clair County Juvenile Abuse and Neglect Division, a supervisor in Felony Probation Revocations and a felony prosecutor. He also was one of 50 attorneys selected nationwide to participate in the Federal Bureau of Investigation's National Law Institute in Quantico, Virginia. He later chose to enter private practice

== Illinois Senate ==
In 1995, Clayborne was appointed to complete the term of longtime Senator Kenneth Hall and was later elected in his own right in 1996. In 2009, he became the Senate Majority Leader after finishing second to John Cullerton in the race for Senate President.

Clayborne is the current chair of the Assignments Committee as well as the committees on Energy, Executive Appointments, Insurance, Public Pensions & State Investments and the subcommittees on Governmental Operations and Constitutional Amendments.

Clayborne also served as a delegate to the 2012 Democratic National Convention.

Clayborne was succeed in the Illinois Senate by Christopher Belt and as Majority Leader by Kimberly A. Lightford.

Illinois Senate
Preceded by Debbie Halvorson	Majority Leader of the Illinois Senate; 2009–2019	Succeeded by Kimberly A. Lightford
