= Rosander =

Rosander is a Swedish surname.

== Geographical distribution ==
As of 2014, 66.6% of all known bearers of the surname Rosander were residents of Sweden (frequency 1:6,260), 29.7% of the United States (1:514,603) and 2.1% of Norway (1:104,946).

In Sweden, the frequency of the surname was higher than national average (1:6,260) in the following counties:

1. Kalmar County (1:1,970)
2. Kronoberg County (1:3,137)
3. Skåne County (1:3,991)
4. Östergötland County (1:4,208)
5. Halland County (1:4,432)
6. Gotland County (1:4,499)
7. Örebro County (1:4,456)
8. Jönköping County (1:4,844)
9. Blekinge County (1:5,498)
10. Uppsala County (1:5,928)

== People ==
- Bertil T. Rosander (1912–2000), American politician and businessman
- Oscar Rosander (1901–1971), Swedish film editor
- Hans Rosander (1937–2016), Swedish footballer
- Hannah Widell (born 1975), née Rosander, Swedish television presenter
