= Ducoin v Viamonte =

Ducoin v. Viamonte was a 2009 legal decision in Florida that addressed the issue of whether or not a dentist has a right to announce credentials that are not recognized or approved by the American Dental Association.

Francis J. Ducoin D.D.S. is a dentist in Stuart, Florida who had become a Fellow of the American Academy of Implant Dentistry (AAID) in 1989. He had also earned Diplomate status with the American Board of Oral Implantology (ABOI). Joining in the lawsuit was Dr. Frederick Costello, an accredited member of the American Academy of Cosmetic Dentistry, and Dr. Steven C. Hewett, who also held credentials in implant dentistry from the American Academy of Implant Dentistry and the American Board of Oral Implantology. Drs. Costello and Hewett also held Fellowship credentials with the Academy of General Dentistry (AGD). All three of these dentists were contending that they had a right to announce these credentials to the public without restriction, but the Florida Board of Dentistry was restricting that right. The Board was requiring that any such announcements be accompanied by this disclaimer:

"(Name of announced area of dental practice) is not recognized as a specialty area by the American Dental Association or the Florida Board of Dentistry.

"(Name of referenced organization) is not recognized as a bona fide specialty accrediting organization by the American Dental Association or the Florida Board of Dentistry."

The Florida Circuit Court overturned the restriction and declared that the dentists had the right to advertise these credentials without restriction. There were two basic rationales for the decision. First, the court held that the disclaimer was an unreasonable restriction of free speech. In his opinion, Judge Frank Sheffield stated, "The Court finds that AGD, AACD, AAID and ABOI are reputable organizations that convey valid, meaningful, credentials," even though such credentials were not recognized by the American Dental Association and were in areas that the ADA doesn't recognize as specialties.

The second rationale was that the disclaimer conferred the force of law on the opinions of the American Dental Association, which is a trade association. The other organizations (AGD, AACD, AAID and ABOI) also had valid claims to legitimacy.

The decision in Ducoin v Viamonte had national reverberations. Since that time, it has come to be regarded as established law that dentists with credentials from these organizations have the right to announce those credentials to the public, without interference from boards of dentistry.
