= Senator Gottschalk =

Senator Gottschalk may refer to:

- Arthur R. Gottschalk (1925–2020), Illinois State Senate
- Fred Gottschalk (1902–1965), Nebraska State Senate
