= James C. McGloon =

American politician

James C. McGloon (August 22, 1879 – December 26, 1943) was an American lawyer and politician.

Born in Clinton, Iowa, McGloon moved to Chicago, Illinois in 1888. McGloon graduated from Loyola University Chicago School of Law and practiced law. McGloon served in the Illinois House of Representatives from 1915 to 1919 and was a Democrat. McGloon died at Illinois Research Hospital in Chicago, Illinois. His son was Thomas A. McGloon who also served in the Illinois General Assembly.
