= Marvin S. Lieberman =

American politician (1933–2016)

Member of the Illinois House of Representatives

Personal details
- Born: June 20, 1933 St. Louis, Missouri, U.S.
- Died: January 3, 2016 (aged 82) Santa Fe, New Mexico, U.S.
- Party: Democratic

Marvin Samuel Lieberman (June 20, 1933 – January 3, 2016) was an American politician who served as a member of the Illinois House of Representatives in the 74th Illinois General Assembly.

He died at his home in Santa Fe, New Mexico on January 3, 2016, at the age of 82.

== Personal life ==
He was Jewish.
