= Thaddeus Weclew =

Dentist Dr. Thaddeus V. Weclew (1906–1992) was one of the creators of the Academy of General Dentistry in 1952. He also was the founder and first chancellor of the Academy of Continuing Dental Education. Dr. Weclew served on the faculty of the University of Illinois at Chicago College of Dentistry and its dental radiology department for 32 years.

Throughout his career, Dr. Weclew received numerous honors, including the rank of officer, Ordre des Palmes Académiques, from the French government for his work with the Academy of General Dentistry.

Annually, the Academy of General Dentistry confers a Thaddeus V. Weclew Fellowship, and the University of Illinois at Chicago holds a Weclew Lecture, funded by a gift from the Academy of General Dentistry.

Dr. Weclew died October 16, 1992.
