= John O. Jones =

American politician (born 1940)

Member of the Illinois Senate from the 54th district
- In office 2003–2013
- Preceded by: William L. O'Daniel
- Succeeded by: Kyle McCarter

Personal details
- Born: October 8, 1940 (age 85) Broughton, Illinois
- Party: Republican
- Spouse: Mimi
- Profession: State Legislator

John O. Jones (born October 8, 1940) is a former Republican member of the Illinois Senate, representing the 54th district from 2003 to 2013. Jones previously served in the Illinois House of Representatives from 1995 to 2002.

== Early life ==
Jones was born in Broughton, Illinois. He graduated from Mount Vernon Township High School in 1958. He served four years in the United States Air Force and was discharged in 1962 as an Airman First Class. At the time of his election to the Illinois House of Representatives, he was the owner of Jones Trucking Services. He and his wife Mimi have two children and five grandchildren.

== Illinois General Assembly ==
In the 1994 general election, Jones won election to the 107th district. The district included all or parts of Jefferson, Wabash, Edwards, White, Lawrence, and Hamilton counties.

In the 2002 general election, Jones defeated Democratic incumbent William L. O'Daniel. In 2012, O. Jones' 54th district was redrawn and, in places, combined with Republican State Senator Kyle McCarter's 51st district to create the new 54th district. John. O. Jones proclaimed his retirement after failing to receive the 2,000 signatures needed for the Republican primary ballot. After considering running as an independent candidate, he told the Centralia Sentinel that he would instead retire from the state Senate, stating he felt that was best for the party and for the people.

Jones was lead sponsor of landmark senior citizen prescription assistance legislation that expanded the Circuit Breaker program by increasing the income eligibility requirements; member of Woodlands Task Force which protected landowners from skyrocketing property taxes on vacant woodland, grassland and wetlands; sponsored education reform bill creating a base level funding for each student; sponsored comprehensive legislation to revitalize the coal industry in Illinois and he has been a strong advocate for township government, school construction funding and ethanol promotion.

During his time in the Senate, he was assigned to the following committees: Committees on Licensed Activities (Minority Spokesperson); Agriculture and Conservation; Commerce and Economic Development; Judiciary Criminal Law; State Government and Veterans Affairs

=== Legislative Awards ===
Friend of 4-H - Illinois Association of Vocational Agriculture Teachers, Illinois Agriculture Association Activator - Friend of Agriculture Award, Friend of the Family Award, CARES Advisory Council - Carpe Diem Award, Guardian of Small Business Award, Illinois HomeCare Council - Legislator of the Year, Illinois Firefighters Association – Legislator of the Year, Township Officials of Illinois – Legislator of the Year, Township Officials of Effingham County – Legislator of the Year, Illinois Civil Justice League’s - Friend of Fairness.
