= William L. O'Daniel =

American farmer and politician (1923–2017)

William L. O'Daniel (December 4, 1923 – November 15, 2017) was an American farmer and politician.

O'Daniel was born in Union County, Kentucky, on December 4, 1923. O'Daniel attended high school in Albion, Illinois. During World War II, he was a paratrooper in the United States Army and saw service in the Philippines. For his service, he was awarded the Purple Heart, the Bronze Star and the Presidential Unit Citation. He later became a conservation contractor and went into full time farming in 1963. He served as Director of Wayne County Soil and Conservation District for ten years. He was a commissioner of the Wabash Valley Interstate Commission and of the Skillet Fork Drainage District respectively. O'Daniel lived in Mount Vernon, Illinois, with his wife and family.

In 1974, he became one of three representatives for the 54th district in the Illinois House of Representatives. At the time, was located in southeastern Illinois. O’Daniel served in the Illinois House of Representatives from 1974 to 1977. On October 31, 1977, he resigned from the House in 1977 to take a position as the Illinois director of the Agricultural Stabilization and Conservation Service. Robert V. Walsh, who served in the House from 1963 until 1967, was appointed to fill O'Daniel's vacancy.

In the 1984 general election, Senator Terry Bruce was elected to the United States House of Representatives from Illinois's 19th congressional district. Bruce resigned from the Illinois Senate effective January 4, 1985. Local Democratic leaders appointed O'Daniel to the vacancy created by Bruce's resignation. O'Daniel then served in the Illinois Senate from 1985 to 2003 and was a Democrat. In the 2002 general election, Republican candidate John O. Jones defeated O'Daniel.

O'Daniel died November 15, 2017, at a hospital in Fairfield, Illinois.
