= James Gitz =

American politician

James "Jim" Gitz

Mayor of Freeport
- In office May 2013 – May 2017
- Preceded by: George Gaulrapp
- Succeeded by: Jodi Miller
- In office May 1997 – May 2005
- Preceded by: Richard Weis
- Succeeded by: George Gaulrapp

Member of the Illinois Senate from the 35th district
- In office January 1979 – January 1983
- Preceded by: John B. Roe
- Succeeded by: Harlan Rigney

Personal details
- Born: September 19, 1948 (age 78) Florence Township, Illinois
- Party: Democratic
- Other political affiliations: Freeport Citizens Party
- Education: Bradley University (B.A.); Northwestern University (J.D.)

James Laverne Gitz is an American politician from Illinois who has served as mayor of Freeport, Illinois, and as a member of the Illinois Senate.

== Early life ==
Gitz was born September 19, 1948, and raised on a farm outside of Freeport, Illinois in Florence Township. He attended Bradley University where he was student body president in 1970 and graduated with a bachelor of arts. After graduating, Gitz worked in the 1972 George McGovern presidential campaign, and was executive director of the Association of Illinois Student Governments. He then served as a legislative liaison of the Capital Development Board of Illinois from 1975 to 1976. He was also a legislative consultant and aide to then Governor Dan Walker and during the 80th General Assembly he helped draft a bill in the last legislative session aimed at limiting foreign ownership of farmland.

== Illinois Senate ==
In 1978, Gitz ran on a platform that included support for the Equal Rights Amendment, giving a tax break on inheritance of family farms, overhauling the road fund to improve the downstate road system and restoring confidence in government. Gitz defeated Harold J. Adams of Davis Junction, to represent the 35th district, which at the time was located in the northwestern corner of Illinois and become the youngest member in the Illinois Senate at that time. In 1979, Gitz opposed authorizing the Illinois Department of Conservation giving back the Rock River Dam in Ogle County to ComEd, which gave the dam to the state in the 1950s.

In 1981, he proposed SB 610 to revise the membership of the Weather Modification Board, appoint the Institute of Natural Resources to oversee weather modification, eliminate licenses for weather modification operations but still require permits, and repeal the Weather Modification Control Act as of October 1, 1991. Also that year, Gitz worked on bills concerning reforms to the Illinois Commerce Commission including bills to prohibit construction works in progress (CWIP) and all other costs of nonutilized capacity, prohibit advertising costs from rate structure, prohibit CWIP and costs of unused land and grant General Assembly oversight of HCC-granted rate increases. After these bills failed to pass the Senate, he spoke out about the status quo on utilities in Illinois saying "what happens down here with bills on the Commerce Commission and utility reform is outrageous."

Gitz was defeated for re-election in 1982 by State Representative Harlan Rigney also of Freeport, Illinois. After leaving the Illinois Senate he began classes at Northwestern University School of Law. He graduated in 1986 and began a practice in Freeport. After his tenure, he also remained active as a member of the Illinois Democratic Central Committee from the 16th district and as Chair of the local Democratic Party in Stephenson County in the 1980s.

== Mayor of Freeport ==
In 1997, he succeeded Richard Weiss as mayor and was re-elected in 2001 over three other candidates. In 2001 he was appointed to the Illinois Municipal league board of directors where he served until he was defeated in a bid for re-election as Mayor of Freeport in 2005.

After losing re-election in 2005 he served as the city attorney for Urbana, Illinois, and the city administrator for Fond du Lac, Wisconsin. After eight years out of office, Gitz chose to run and in February 2013, he defeated his successor and incumbent mayor George Gaulrapp in the primary for the Citizen's Party. In April, he was elected Mayor of Freeport against People's Party candidate Jon Staben by 71 votes. During the election he was endorsed by the Freeport Police Benevolent and Protective Association Union and the Journal-Standard, a local newspaper in Freeport. In October 2013, he was once again appointed to the board of directors for the Illinois Municipal League. In 2016, the voters of Freeport, Illinois, abolished the position of full-time mayor. Instead, they voted for a change to a city manager form of government. James Gitz then announced that he would not seek the position of part-time mayor.
