= Kimberly Lightford =

American politician (born 1968)

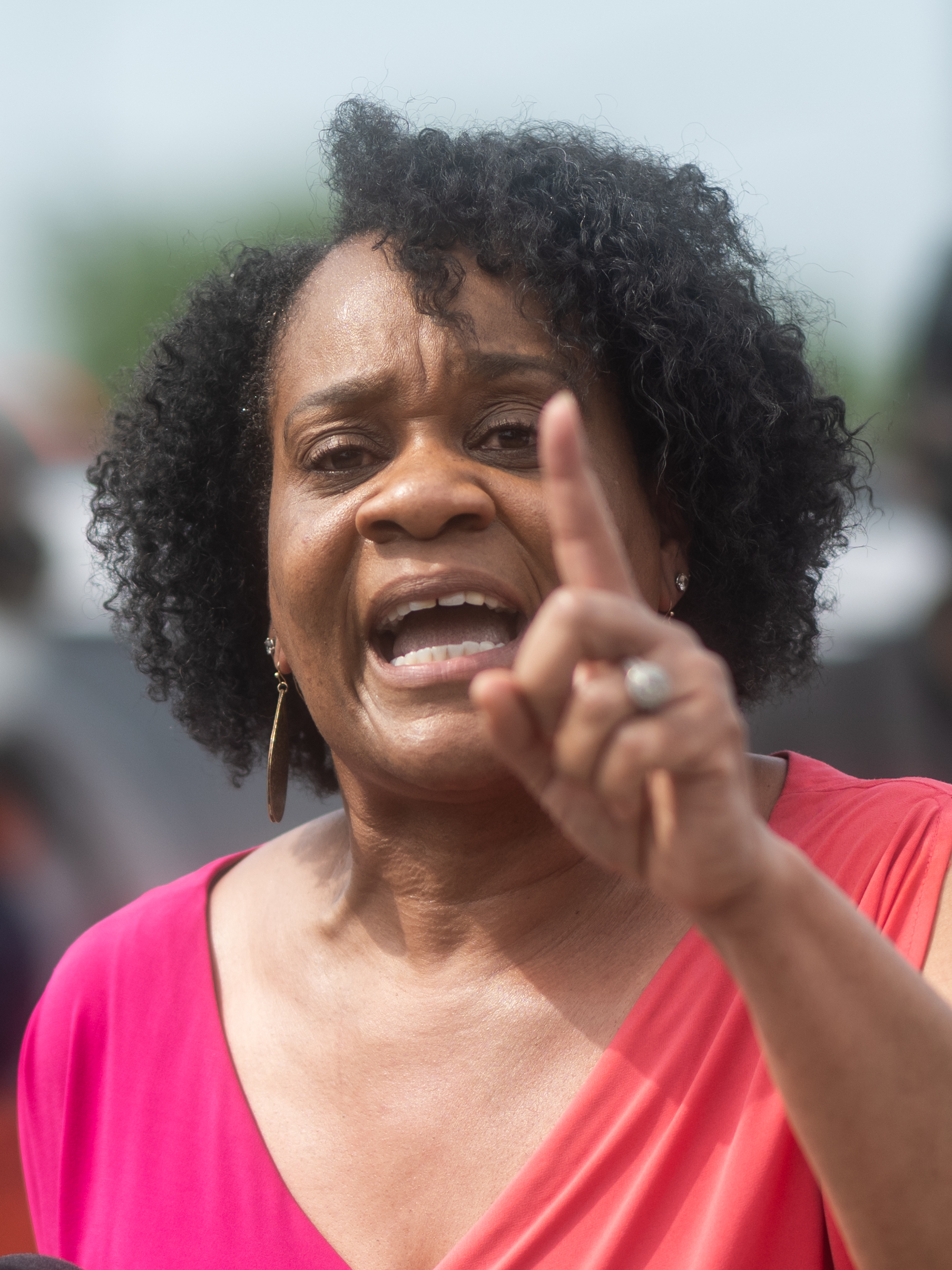

Majority Leader of the Illinois Senate
- Incumbent
- Assumed office January 9, 2019
- Preceded by: James Clayborne Jr.

Member of the Illinois Senate from the 4th district
- Incumbent
- Assumed office November 20, 1998
- Preceded by: Earlean Collins

Personal details
- Born: May 10, 1968 (age 58) Chicago, Illinois, U.S.
- Party: Democratic
- Education: Western Illinois University (BA); University of Illinois, Springfield (MPA)

Kimberly Ann Lightford (born May 10, 1968) is a Democratic member of the Illinois Senate, representing the 4th district since 1998. She is Senate Majority Leader and also serves on Labor, Education, Executive, Financial Institutions and Redistricting committees. She is also chair of the Senate Black Caucus and co-chair of the Illinois Commission of Intergovernmental Cooperation.

== Biography ==
Lightford attended Proviso East High School before going on to Western Illinois University, where she was initiated as a member of Delta Sigma Theta sorority. After college, she attended graduate school at the University of Illinois Springfield where she earned a master's degree in Public Administration (MPA) and completed an internship with the Illinois Department of Corrections. After graduation, she accepted a position with the Department of Corrections in Chicago. She successfully ran for Maywood Village Trustee after encouragement from her state representative. When State Senator Earlean Collins announced plans to retire, Lightford was elected in March 1998 and began serving in November, two months before the traditional inauguration, when Collins retired.

In July 2016, the Illinois Senate passed a stop-gap temporary budget bill. Within a few minutes, Lightford addressed the Senate. In her remarks, she said that legislators needed to get paid for their work. Although the only body in Illinois responsible for the state budget is the state legislature, Lightford said, "And I think it’s wrong for our income to be held for months, and months, and months, which is another game that’s being played."

In 2018, Governor-elect J. B. Pritzker appointed Lightford to the Educational Success transition committee, which is responsible for state education policy.

After Illinois Senate President John Cullerton announced his retirement, Lightford became a candidate to replace him. If she had been selected, she would have been the first woman to hold the position. She was ultimately beaten out for the position by Don Harmon. After losing to Harmon in closed-door Democratic Party negotiations, Lightford herself placed Harmon's name into nomination at the formal vote for Senate President.

Lightford was the victim of a carjacking on December 22, 2021, during which her husband was shot at. Her husband returned gunfire at the carjackers. She said, "I thought for sure they were gonna shoot me down... It was a lot of shots being fired. I think they were shooting at my husband and me and luckily enough my husband is concealed and carry and he was able to protect us."

As of July 2022, Senator Lightford is a member of the following Illinois Senate committees:

- Appropriations - Personnel and Procurement Committee (SAPP-SAPP)
- Appropriations - Education Committee (SAPP-SAED)
- (Chairwoman of) Assignments Committee (SCOA)
- Education Committee (SESE)
- Executive Committee (SEXC)
- Executive - Cannabis Subcommittee (SEXC-SEOC)
- (Chairwoman of) Executive - Government Operations Subcommittee (SEXC-SEGO)
- Executive - Special Issues Subcommittee (SEXC-SESI)
- Higher Education Committees (SCHE)
- Labor Committee (SLAB)
- (Chairwoman of) Redistricting - Chicago West and Western Cook County Subcommittee (SRED-SRWW)

== Political positions ==
Lightford supports the right of law abiding citizens to carry a concealed handgun.

== See also ==
- Chicago metropolitan area
- Gun violence in Chicago

Illinois Senate
Preceded by James Clayborne Jr.	Majority Leader of the Illinois Senate; 2019–present	Incumbent
