= Dan Crane =

American politician and dentist (1936–2019)

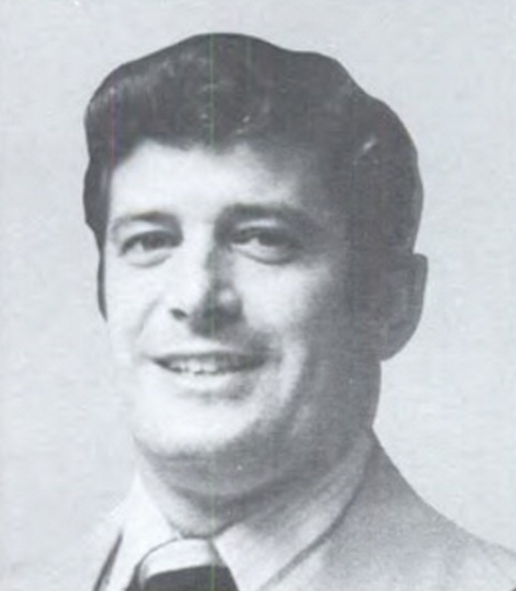
- Official portrait, c. 1979

Member of the U.S. House of Representatives from Illinois
- In office January 3, 1979 – January 3, 1985
- Preceded by: George E. Shipley
- Succeeded by: Terry L. Bruce
- Constituency: 22nd district (1979–1983); 19th district (1983–1985)

Personal details
- Born: Daniel Bever Crane; January 10, 1936 Chicago, Illinois, U.S.
- Died: May 28, 2019 (aged 83) Danville, Illinois, U.S.
- Party: Republican
- Spouse: Judy Crane (1970–2012 (her death))
- Children: 6
- Relatives: Phil Crane (brother)
- Education: Hillsdale College (BA); Indiana University, Indianapolis (DDS); University of Michigan

Military service
- Branch/service: United States Army
- Years of service: 1967–1970
- Rank: Captain
- Battles/wars: Vietnam War

Daniel Bever Crane (January 10, 1936 – May 28, 2019) was an American dentist and a member of the U.S. House of Representatives from Illinois. A Republican, he served in the House from 1979 to 1985. In 1983, Crane was censured by the House for having sex with a 17-year-old page.

== Early life, education, and military service ==
Crane, a native of Cook County, Illinois, was born on January 10, 1936. Crane attended Chicago public schools. He received his B.A. from Hillsdale College in 1958 and his D.D.S. from Indiana University in 1963. After doing graduate work at the University of Michigan in 1964 and 1965, Crane joined the United States Army in 1967, serving until 1970. Crane's military service included service in Vietnam during the Vietnam War.

== Career ==
Crane was elected to the U.S. House of Representatives as a Republican in 1978. He was re-elected in 1980 and in 1982. During his House tenure, he represented Illinois's 22nd and 19th congressional districts, respectively. According to The New York Times, in his campaigns, Crane "portrayed himself as a solid, churchgoing, family man, a conservative Republican who set himself apart from what he described as the fast-living 'Washington set'". Crane supported prayer in schools and opposed abortion rights.

On July 14, 1983, the House Committee on Standards of Official Conduct recommended that Crane and Rep. Gerry Studds (D-MA) be reprimanded for having engaged in sexual relationships with teenagers. Crane had engaged in sex with a 17-year-old female House page in 1980. He acknowledged the accuracy of the charges and supported his own censure. The full House voted to censure Crane on July 20, 1983. Crane was defeated for re-election in 1984 and returned to the practice of dentistry.

== Personal life ==
Crane was the brother of Phil Crane, also a Republican congressman from Illinois.

Crane married his wife, Judy, in 1970. The couple had six children. Judy Crane died in 2012. Crane died on May 28, 2019, at the age of 83.

== See also ==
- List of federal political sex scandals in the United States
- List of United States representatives expelled, censured, or reprimanded

U.S. House of Representatives
Preceded by George E. Shipley	Member of the U.S. House of Representatives from Illinois's 22nd congressional district 1979–1983	Succeeded by Paul Simon
Preceded by Tom Railsback	Member of the U.S. House of Representatives from Illinois's 19th congressional district 1983–1985	Succeeded by Terry L. Bruce
