= Kyle McCarter =

American politician and diplomat (born 1962)

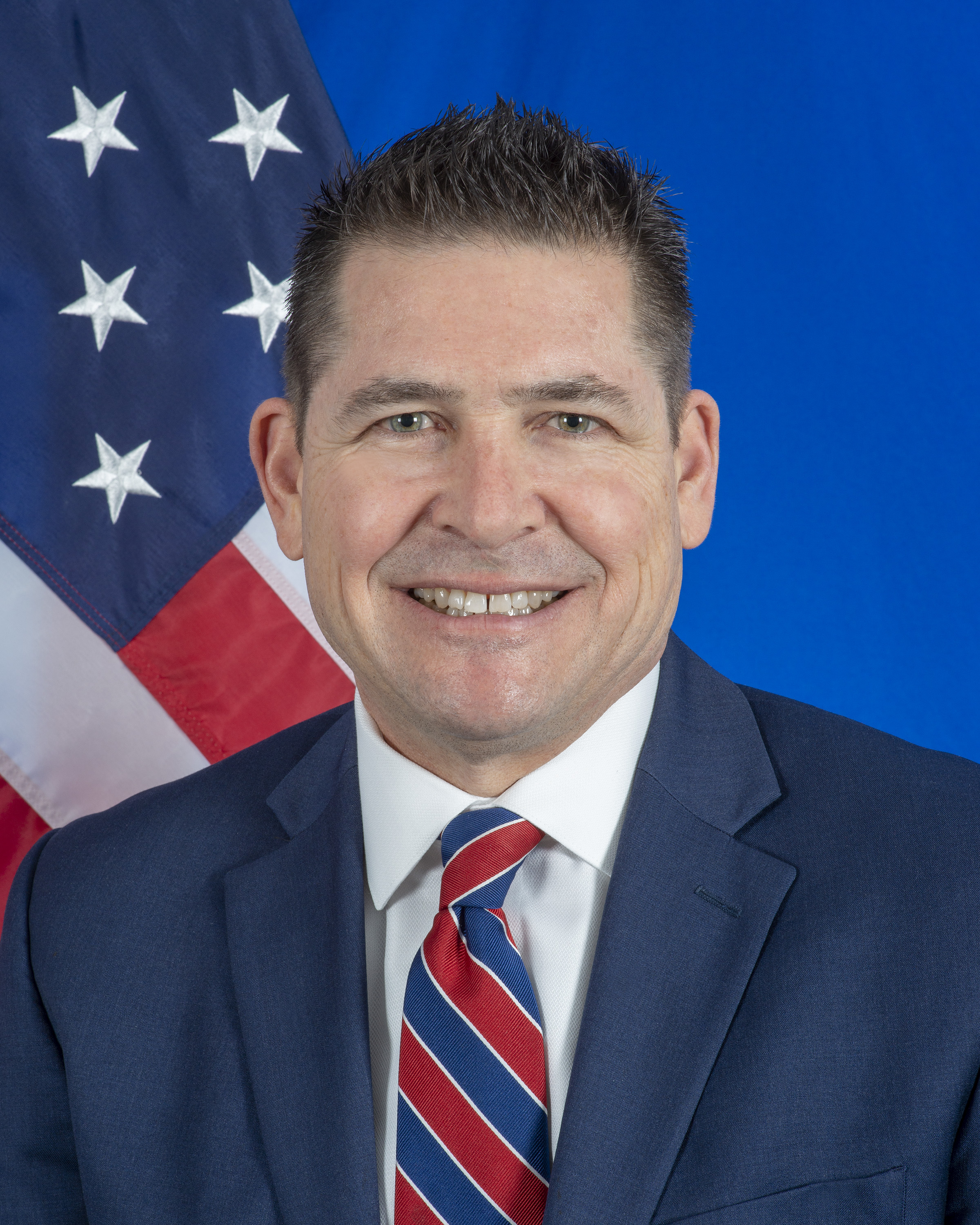

United States Ambassador to Kenya
- In office March 12, 2019 – January 20, 2021
- President: Donald Trump
- Preceded by: Robert F. Godec
- Succeeded by: Meg Whitman

Member of the Illinois Senate from the 54th district
- In office January 9, 2013 – January 9, 2019
- Preceded by: John O. Jones
- Succeeded by: Jason Plummer

Member of the Illinois Senate from the 51st district
- In office February 23, 2009 – January 9, 2013
- Preceded by: Frank Watson
- Succeeded by: Chapin Rose

Personal details
- Born: June 27, 1962 (age 64) Waco, Texas, U.S.
- Party: Republican
- Spouse: Victoria Ramatowski
- Children: 3
- Education: Oral Roberts University (BS)

Kyle McCarter (born June 27, 1962) is an American politician from Illinois and former diplomat. He served as the United States Ambassador to Kenya from 2019 to 2021. He previously served as a Republican member of the Illinois Senate from February 2009 to January 2019.

== Early life ==
McCarter was born in Waco, Texas, on June 27, 1962. He is the son of Mr. Calvin and Linda McCarter. He attended Muskogee High School and he completed his studies in 1980. McCarter graduated from Oral Roberts University in 1984 with a degree in accounting.

== Career ==
McCarter was a member of the St. Clair County board from 2000 until 2009, when he was appointed to the Illinois State Senate. McCarter also served for six years on the O'Fallon Chamber of Commerce board of directors, including two years as president and four years as chairman of the economic development committee.

=== Businesses ===
McCarter owns and operates Custom Product Innovations and Custom Coating Innovations in Lebanon, Illinois. McCarter's companies outsource parts of their production to China. McCarter said, "I go to China four to six times a year to visit with our manufacturers. It's a capitalist's dream over there."

=== Non-profits ===
McCarter and his wife, Victoria, lived and worked in Kenya for Each1Feed1, a Christian ministry that gives care and education for orphans and widows, in 1987–1988 and built Faith Medical Clinic. McCarter currently is the international director and Victoria is the director of education for Each1Feed1, and they travel to Kenya several times a year. McCarter is also a supporter of Mercy Ministries, a charitable Christian organization.

== Illinois State Senate ==
After Republican state senator Frank Watson resigned, shortly after suffering a stroke, McCarter was appointed to fill his place in the Illinois State Senate in February 2009. McCarter was described as "a reliable GOP vote in the state senate."

On May 31, 2011, McCarter accused Democratic state Sen. Mike Jacobs of punching him after a debate over an electricity rate increase, a claim Jacobs denied by saying in a televised interview that "the senator was full of shit" and "someone who couldn't even really polish my shoes". McCarter had noted that Jacobs' father was a registered lobbyist for the utility, but Jacobs' response was that "one thing he would not allow to happen would be for anyone to question my integrity." Jacobs also said this information had been fully disclosed, his constituents were aware of it, "and they would make a decision based on that". It was reported that McCarter filed a police statement over the incident.

After the Senate redistricting, parts of the old 51st, 54th, and 58th districts were combined to create the new 54th Senate District. Another incumbent Republican, John O. Jones, was also drawn into the 54th district. However, Jones failed to adequately meet the petition filing requirements and did not appear on the ballot. After Jones ruled out an independent bid, McCarter ran successfully for the 54th district.

He chose not to seek reelection in 2018. He was succeeded in the Illinois Senate by Jason Plummer.

=== Committee assignments ===
As of the 100th General Assembly, McCarter sits on the following committees: Appropriations II; *Environment and Conservation (Minority Spokesperson); Public Health; Local Government; Labor; and State Government.

=== Legislative positions ===
==== Anti-bullying bill ====
In May 2012, McCarter voted against a bill in the state senate that would have encouraged public schools to implement anti-bullying programs. McCarter voted against the bill because he believed such programs would be used to promote homosexuality. While answering questions about his vote, McCarter said, "Some of these programs are very good. They indeed encourage kids not to bully. But there are programs throughout the United States, used in some high schools and universities, that really have just a pro-homosexual agenda, and nothing but that."

== 2016 campaign for U.S. Congress ==
In October 2015, McCarter announced he would be running for the United States House of Representatives for the 15th district against fellow Republican incumbent John Shimkus, rather than run again for State Senate in 2018. While McCarter does not live in the 15th district, he lives close to the border and has said he is looking to move to Effingham.

McCarter has received Tea Party support, as well as support from other conservative groups, including the Club for Growth. McCarter is running to the right of Shimkus, saying he is insufficiently conservative and an "insider."

Prior to announcing his candidacy for Congress, McCarter used about $33,000 from his state campaign fund to pay a political consultant. That consultant, Elizabeth Van Holt of Isaiah Consulting, appeared with McCarter when he announced his congressional candidacy on October 7, 2015. State law prohibits the use of such campaign funds for federal races. McCarter said the money was paid for work related to his State Senate seat.

Prior to the second quarter of 2015, McCarter's campaign committee never reported more than $50,354 in any quarter since the 2010 election cycle. In early 2016, McCarter's campaign refunded $52,000 in campaign contributions that had been accepted against FEC rules.

McCarter ultimately lost the primary to Shimkus, receiving 39.63 percent of the vote.

== United States Ambassador to Kenya ==
On May 11, 2017, the seven Republican congressmen from Illinois, including John Shimkus who beat McCarter in the 2016 primary, encouraged President Donald Trump to nominate McCarter as the next United States Ambassador to Kenya. The delegation wrote that McCarter's work in Kenya with Each1Feed1 has provided him "heightened insight into the governmental operations and other political, economic, and social realities of both Kenya and the larger region of East Africa." On March 28, 2018, Trump announced he was nominating McCarter to the position. He was scrutinized by Democrats during his committee hearing and was reported out of committee on a 12–9 vote. The United States Senate confirmed McCarter by voice vote on January 2, 2019. He presented his credentials to President Uhuru Kenyatta on March 12, 2019. He left office on January 20, 2021.

== Later career ==
Following his ambassadorship, McCarter moved to Oklahoma. He considered, but ultimately declined, a run for U.S. Senate in 2022 special election in Oklahoma.

== Personal life ==
McCarter and his wife Victoria lived in Lebanon, Illinois before moving to Oklahoma after his ambassadorship. They have two living children: Zach and Austin. Their daughter Amber died in 2006 at the age of 21 from a heroin overdose.

Diplomatic posts
Preceded by Robert F. Godec	United States Ambassador to Kenya; 2019–2021	Succeeded by Meg Whitman
