= Walter Hoffelder =

American businessman and politician

Walter P. Hoffelder (December 25, 1900 – October 8, 1994) was an American businessman and politician.

== Personal life ==
Hoffelder was born in Chicago, Illinois. He went to Carl Schurz High School and to the Metropolitan Business College. Hoffelder lived in Chicago with his wife and family. He was involved with the trucking and bus transportation businesses. He was also involved with the landscape business and with investments. Hoffelder also owned a horse farm in Northbrook, Illinois. Hoffelder served in the Illinois House of Representatives from 1961 to 1963 and in the Illinois Senate from 1963 to 1971. Hoffeider was a Republican. Hoffelder died at Glenbrook Hospital in Glenview, Illinois. In the 1970 election Robert J. Egan defeated Hoffelder.
