= Clifford B. Latherow =

American farmer and politician (1915-1994)

Clifford B. Latherow (December 4, 1915 – October 25, 1994) was an American farmer and politician.

Latherow was born on a farm near Fountain Green, Hancock County, Illinois. He graduated from La Harpe High School in La Harpe, Illinois and from Western Illinois University. Latherow served in the United States Navy during World War II and was commissioned a lieutenant. He taught in high schools. Latherow was a grain ad livestock farmer. He lived in Carthage, Illinois with his wife and family. Latherow served as a township supervisor and on the local board of education. He was a Republican. Latherow served in the Illinois Senate from 1965 to 1977. He died at Quincy Blessing Hospital in Quincy, Illinois.
