= Everett R. Peters =

Everett Robert Peters Illinois State Senator

Everett Robert Peters (January 1894 – June 25, 1972) was an American farmer and politician who served in the Illinois Senate from 1940 until his retirement in 1970. He was a longtime resident of St. Joseph, Illinois, and descended from one of the town’s earliest settler families.

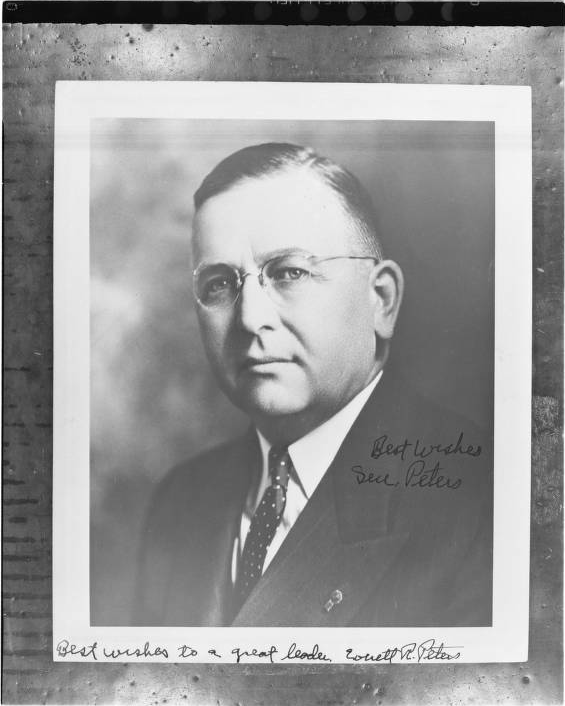
Photo of Senator Everett R. Peters taken by Eddie Winfred Doc Helm Published by Illinois Secretary of State

== Early life and family ==
Peters was born in January 1894, the only son of Isaac and Mary Peters. He descended from a long line of early Illinois settlers. His great-grandfather, William Peters, moved to the area in 1831 and established one of the largest farms in the region.

== Political career ==
Everett Peters began his public service in the early 1920s, serving as a township clerk and supervisor in St. Joseph. In 1934, he was nominated as a Republican to a seat in the Illinois House of Representatives, and won election, serving three terms. In his last term, he was appointed chair of the House Revenue Committee. His work in that office was lauded by Illinois House Speaker Hugh W. Cross, and in 1940, he was elected to the Illinois Senate, where he served continuously until retiring in 1970, completing over 50 years of public service.

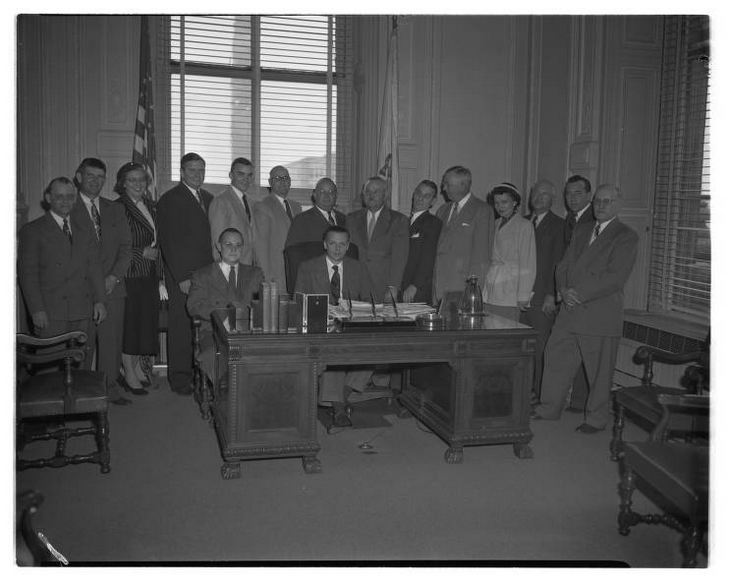
Group of Illinois state legislators in the mid-20th century, including Senator Everett Peters

In December 1971, Peters was indicted for alleged violations of the Illinois state ethics code in connection with the "race track stock" scandal, a broader investigation into political involvement in the state's horse racing industry. The charges included official misconduct related to his legislative position. Peters pleaded not guilty on December 17. His trial was postponed due to poor health. He died in June 1972 before the case went to trial.

== Personal life ==
Peters married Evelyn Messinger in December 1920. They had five children. He lived in the family home in St. Joseph throughout his life. He died on June 25, 1972, at the age of 78.

== Legacy ==
Peters was honored in the 1972 St. Joseph Centennial publication for his decades of public service and his role in local and state government. His photograph along with group photos from his legislative career were also preserved in the Illinois Digital Archives as part of the Eddie Winfred “Doc” Helm Photograph Collection.
