= John C. Parkhurst =

American politician

Member of the Illinois House of Representatives

Personal details
- Party: Republican

John Carlton Parkhurst (July 14, 1920 – October 17, 2009) was an American lawyer and politician.

Parkhurst was born in Springfield, Illinois. He lived in Peoria, Illinois with his family. He went to the Peoria public schools and graduated from Peoria High School in 1938. He graduated from Wabash College in 1942. Parkhurst served in the United States Army Air Forces during World War II. In 1948, Parkhurst graduated from the University of Michigan Law School and was admitted to the Illinois bar. He practiced law in Peoria and served as an Assistant Illinois Attorney General. Parkhurst served on the Peoria County Board from 1949 to 1958. He then served in the Illinois House of Representatives from 1959 to 1969 and was a Republican. Parkhurst served in the Illinois Constitutional Convention of 1969–1970. Parkhurst died at Lutheran Hillside Village in Peoria, Illinois.
