= Mike Jacobs (Illinois politician) =

American politician (born 1960)

Member of the Illinois Senate from the 36th district
- In office February 2005 – January 2015
- Preceded by: Denny Jacobs
- Succeeded by: Neil Anderson

Personal details
- Born: June 25, 1960 (age 66) Moline, Illinois, U.S.
- Party: Democratic
- Spouse: Beth Wendt (divorced)
- Relations: Oral Jacobs (grandfather); Denny Jacobs (father)
- Children: 1
- Education: University of Illinois

Mike Jacobs (born June 25, 1960) was a Democratic member of the Illinois Senate, who represented the 36th District from when he was appointed in 2005 until 2015. The 36th district, located in Western Illinois, includes all or parts of East Moline, Moline, Rock Island, Rock Falls and Sterling.

== Background ==
Jacobs was born in Moline, Illinois. He received his bachelor's degree in political science from University of Illinois at Springfield and his master's degree in political science from University of West Florida. Jacobs was appointed to the Illinois Senate on February 9, 2005.

== Political career ==
Following a 2007 meeting with Illinois Governor Rod Blagojevich, meant to convince Jacobs to vote for Blagojevich's health insurance proposals, Jacobs told reporters that the Governor "blew up at him like a 10-year-old child", acted as if he might hit Jacobs, screamed obscenities at him and threatened to ruin his political career if Jacobs didn't vote for the bill. Jacobs said if Blagojevich had talked to him like that at a tavern, "I would have kicked his tail end." Blagojevich would not comment on the alleged incident. Jacobs was presented with a pair of boxing gloves after returning to the Senate. Jacobs was succeeded by Republican Neil Anderson.

On May 31, 2011, Jacobs was accused by Republican state Sen. Kyle McCarter of punching him after a debate over an electricity rate increase, a claim he denied by saying in a televised interview that "the senator was full of shit" and "someone who couldn't even really polish my shoes". McCarter had noted that Jacobs' father was a registered lobbyist for the utility, but Jacobs' response was that "one thing he would not allow to happen would be for anyone to question my integrity". Jacobs also said this information had been fully disclosed, his constituents were aware of it, "and they would make a decision based on that". It was reported that McCarter filed a police statement over the incident.

== Family ==
His grandfather Oral Jacobs and his father Denny Jacobs also served in the Illinois General Assembly.
