= W. Russell Arrington =

American politician and lawyer

William Russell Arrington (July 4, 1906 – October 3, 1979) was an American politician and lawyer.

Born on Independence Day in Gillespie, Illinois, Arrington was educated in East St. Louis before proceeding to the University of Illinois, where he earned first a BA (1928) and then a JD from the University of Illinois College of Law in 1930. He was admitted to the Illinois bar and practiced law in Evanston, Illinois. He was a Republican. From 1945 to 1953, Arrington served in the Illinois House of Representatives, representing the 6th district. Then from 1955 to 1973, Arrington served in the Illinois State Senate, representing the 6th district (1955–1956), 4th district (1957–1966) and finally 1st district (1971–1972).

No less an authority than Michael Madigan, long-time Speaker of the Illinois House, said of Arrington, No doubt, Senator Arrington is the father of the modern General Assembly.. Among many key reforms, he spearheaded increased legislative staff, internship programs, and more frequent legislative sessions.

Arrington died at his home in Evanston, Illinois.

The Arrington Lagoon in Evanston's Dawes Park along the shore of Lake Michigan is dedicated in Russ Arrington's honor.
