= Oral Jacobs =

American politician (1911–1995)

Member of the Illinois House of Representatives
- In office 1969–1979
- In office 1965–1967

Personal details
- Born: July 20, 1911 Matherville, Illinois, U.S.
- Died: October 8, 1995 (aged 84) Sherman, Illinois, U.S.
- Party: Democratic
- Children: Denny Jacobs
- Relatives: Mike Jacobs (grandson)
- Occupation: Politician

Military service
- Allegiance: United States
- Branch/service: United States Navy
- Battles/wars: World War II

Oral "Jake" Jacobs (July 20, 1911 – October 8, 1995) was an American politician.

Jacobs was born in Matherville, Illinois. He went to the county schools in Mercer County, Illinois and Rock Island County, Illinois. Jacobs also went to tax schools. Jacobs served in the United States Navy during World War II. Jacobs lived with his wife and family in East Moline, Illinois and was involved in the consultant engineering business and worked for the Illinois Department of Revenue. Jacobs served on the East Moline City Council and was a Democrat. Jacobs served in the Illinois House of Representatives from 1965 to 1967 and from 1969 to 1979. He died in a nursing home in Sherman, Illinois. His son Denny Jacobs and his grandson Mike Jacobs also served in the Illinois General Assembly.
