= Everett Laughlin =

American politician (1915–2003)

Everett E. Laughlin (1915–2003) was an American politician and Republican member of the Illinois Senate from 1961–1973.

Everett Laughlin was born September 2, 1915. He was educated in Freeport, Illinois. He attended Cornell College and the University of Illinois College of Law. Laughlin began practicing law in 1939. He served as the President of the local school board for a term from 1948 to 1952. He then served as the State's Attorney for Stephenson County, Illinois from 1952 to 1956. Laughlin was elected to the Illinois Senate in 1960 and re-elected in 1964, 1966, and 1970. Laughlin opted not to run for a fourth term citing the financial constraints of the de facto full time role of a state legislator. In the 1972 general election, fellow Republican and Ogle County State's Attorney John B. Roe defeated Democratic candidate John E. Smith with 43,028 votes to Smith's 27,763. Laughlin died at age 87 in Rockford, Illinois on June 28, 2003.
