= John B. Roe =

American politician (1942–2020)

John B. Roe III

Member of the Illinois Senate from the 35th district
- In office January 1973 – January 1979
- Preceded by: Everett Laughlin
- Succeeded by: James Gitz

Personal details
- Born: November 21, 1942 Oregon, Illinois
- Died: November 27, 2020 (aged 78) Holmes Beach, Florida
- Party: Republican
- Education: Centre College (B.A.); University of Illinois (J.D.)
- Profession: Attorney; Judge

John Benjamin "Jack" Roe III (November 21, 1942―November 27, 2020) was an American lawyer and politician who served as a Republican member of the Illinois Senate.

== Early life ==
John Benjamin Roe III was born to Jane Gilbert and John B. Roe II on November 21, 1942, in Oregon, Illinois. He graduated from Oregon High School and received his bachelor's degree from Centre College. Roe received his J.D. degree from University of Illinois College of Law and was admitted to the Illinois bar. He practiced law in Oregon, Illinois. Roe served as an assistant state's attorney and as public defender in Ogle County, Illinois. Roe also served as state's attorney for Ogle County from 1968 to 1972. He was admitted to practice in the United States Supreme Court in 1969.

== Illinois Senate ==
Senator Everett Laughlin of Freeport opted not to run for reelection for a fourth term to the Illinois Senate. Roe announced his intention to run for the seat. Roe resigned to run for the Illinois Senate. He defeated Democratic candidate John E. Smith with 43,028 votes to Smith's 27,763. Roe served in the Illinois Senate representing the 35th district from 1973 to 1979. The 35th district, at the time, included all or parts of Boone, Carroll, Jo Daviess, Ogle, and Winnebago counties located in the northwest corner of the state. In the 1976 general election, Roe defeated Democratic candidate Willis McKinney, a school superintendent from Stockton. In 1978, Democratic candidate James Gitz defeated Republican candidate and state legislator Harold Adams to succeed Roe in the Senate.

== Post-legislative career ==
After he left the Senate, Governor James R. Thompson appointed Roe to replace Harry F. Polos as the Chief Justice of the Illinois Court of Claims for a term ending in 1985. His term as chief began on April 20, 1979. He served as chief until March 5, 1985, and his term on the court ended March 26, 1985. He was succeeded by as Chief Justice by James S. Montana, Jr. of Chicago and as a judge by Randy Patchett of Marion.

In 1995, he was appointed by the Illinois Supreme Court to a judgeship in 15th circuit of the Illinois Circuit Court. He was elected in 1996 and stepped down from the position in 2000. Other positions he held in the field of law included serving as an arbitrator for the New York Stock Exchange and Nasdaq.

== Death and legacy ==
Roe died of myelofibrosis on November 27, 2020. On November 1, 2021, Tom Demmer, whose district overlaps the area Roe had represented, introduced a resolution to designate the Rochelle State Route 251 overpass as the "Sen. John B. "Jack" Roe Overpass".
