= Nathan J. Kinnally =

American politician and lawyer

Nathan J. Kinnally (June 18, 1911 – July 20, 1968) was an American politician and lawyer.

Kinnally was born in Chicago, Illinois. Kinnally went to the Chicago parochial schools and graduated from Thomas Aquinas High School. He went to the University of Chicago and the Chicago-Kent College of Law. Kinnally was admitted to the Illinois bar and served an assistant state's attorney for Cook County, Illinois. Kinnally served in the United States Navy during World War II and was commissioned a lieutenant. Kinnally served in the Illinois House of Representatives from 1957 to 1963 and in the Illinois Senate from 1963 to 1967. Kinnally was a Democrat. In 1967, he served on the Illinois Crime Commission and was a co-chair of the crime commission. Kinnally died at the Illinois Central Hospital in Chicago, Illinois.
