= Denny Jacobs =

American politician (born 1937)

Dennis Jacobs

Member of the Illinois Senate
- In office 1987–2005

Personal details
- Born: November 8, 1937 (age 88) Rock Island County, Illinois, U.S.
- Party: Democratic
- Children: Mike Jacobs
- Parent: Oral Jacobs (father)
- Education: Augustana College (BBA)
- Occupation: Politician

Dennis Jacobs (born November 8, 1937) was an American politician.

Born in Rock Island County, Illinois, Jacobs received his bachelor's degree in business administration and political science from Augustana College. From 1987 until 2005, Jacobs served in the Illinois Senate and was a Democrat. He lives in East Moline, Illinois. Jacobs served on the East Moline City Council and on the Rock County Board. He also served as the county auditor. Jacobs also served as mayor of East Moline. His father Oral Jacobs served in the Illinois House of Representatives and his son Mike Jacobs also served in the Illinois Senate.
