= Thomas Awerkamp =

American politician

Thomas James Awerkamp (May 23, 1923 – July 2, 1992) was an American businessman and politician.

Born in Quincy, Illinois, Awerkamp served in the United States Army Air Forces during World War II. He worked in the real estate business in Quincy, Illinois. He served on the Adams County, Illinois Board of Commissioners and was a Democrat. Awerkamp served in the Illinois Senate from 1969 to 1969. Awerkamp died at a hospital in Keokuk, Iowa.
