= Lincoln College of Law =

Former law school in Springfield, Illinois

Lincoln College of Law was a law college in Springfield, Illinois from 1911 to 1953.

In 1924, the Lincoln College of Law added a junior college program for training paralegals.

== See also ==
- List of defunct law schools in the United States
