= Albert W. Hachmeister =

American publisher and politician

Member of the Illinois House of Representatives

Personal details
- Born: June 1, 1918 Chicago, Illinois, U.S.
- Died: July 28, 1980 (aged 62) Chicago, Illinois
- Party: Republican
- Education: Northwestern University

Albert William Hachmeister (June 1, 1918 – July 28, 1980) was an American publisher and politician who served as a member of the Illinois House of Representatives.

Hachmeister was elected to the Illinois House seven times for the 12th District of Chicago from 1952 to 1966 and served as the House minority leader.

He was born in Chicago to Walter Hachmeister and Margaret Becker. His maternal grandparents were German immigrants, and his paternal grandparents were first-generation German Americans. Hachmeister was educated at Lake View High School and Northwestern University. He worked as a publisher, editor, and marketing consultant. He was also vice chairman of the Boy Scouts of America.

He died at Northwestern Memorial Hospital, aged 62, after a lengthy illness.
