= Richard R. Larson (Illinois politician) =

American politician, businessman, and educator

Richard R. Larson (October 11, 1907 – December 20, 1985) was an American politician, businessman, and educator.

Larson was born in Galesburg, Illinois and went to the Galesburg public schools. Larson served in the United States Army Air Forces during World War II and was commissioned a sergeant. He graduated from Knox College in 1933. He taught school and was involved in the insurance business. Larson also worked for the railroad and was an assistant railroad track foreman. Larson served in the Illinois House of Representatives from 1953 to 1957 and in the Illinois Senate from 1857 to 1971. He was a Republican. Larson died at a nursing home in Phoenix, Arizona after suffering from a long illness.
