= Miles E. Mills =

American educator and politician

Member of the Illinois House of Representatives

Personal details
- Party: Democratic

Miles Eugene Mills (February 21, 1891–August 18, 1972) was an American educator and politician.

Mills was born on a farm near Vandalia, Illinois. He went to the public schools and to colleges in Illinois, Kansas, and Montana. He was a teacher, principal, and the superintendent of schools for Effingham County, Illinois. He also served as deputy sheriff for Efingham County. Mills lived in Effingham, Illinois with his wife and family. He served in the Illinois House of Representatives in 1941 and 1942 and from 1957 to 1969. Mills was a Democrat. Mills died in a hospital in Effingham, Illinois from cancer.
