= Bertil T. Rosander =

American politician

Bertil T. Rosander (March 6, 1912 – September 6, 2000) was an American businessman and politician.

Rosander was born in Sweden, and went to the Rockford public schools. He received his bachelor's degree from the University of Illinois and was involved in the accounting business. He served on the Rockford City Council in 1955 and 1959. Rosander was a Republican. He served in the Illinois House of Representatives from 1961 to 1965 and in the Illinois Senate from 1965 to 1973.
