= 71st Illinois General Assembly =

1959 legislative session

The 71st Illinois General Assembly convened on January 7, 1959, and adjourned sine die on June 30, 1959. The General Assembly consists of the Illinois House of Representatives and the Illinois Senate.

== Legislation ==
The 71st General Assembly introduced 2,699 bills, 1,652 in the House and 1,047 in the Senate. Of these, 1,464 were passed by both houses and sent to the governor. Governor William Stratton vetoed 215 in their entirety and 5 in part.
