= 72nd Illinois General Assembly =

1961 legislative session

The 72nd Illinois General Assembly convened on January 4, 1961, and adjourned sine die on June 30, 1961. The General Assembly consists of the Illinois House of Representatives and the Illinois Senate.

== Legislation ==
The 72nd General Assembly introduced 2,680 bills, 1,772 in the House and 908 in the Senate. Of these, 1,464 were passed by both houses and sent to the governor. Governor Otto Kerner Jr. vetoed 258 in their entirety and 9 in part.
