= Robert W. McCarthy =

American politician and lawyer

Member of the Illinois House of Representatives from the 28th district
- In office 1954–1961

Member of the Illinois Senate from the 28th District, 50th District, and 51st district
- In office 1961–1977

Personal details
- Born: May 28, 1924 Lincoln, Illinois, U.S.
- Died: March 19, 2015 (aged 90) Decatur, Illinois, U.S.
- Education: Lincoln College; University of Illinois
- Occupation: attorney

Robert W. McCarthy (May 28, 1924 – March 19, 2015) was an American politician in the state of Illinois.

McCarthy attended Lincoln College and the University of Illinois at Urbana–Champaign, earning a law degree. At the University of Illinois, he also played on the football team. He also served with the United States Army during World War II. McCarthy then practiced law in Decatur, Illinois (McCarthy, Rowden & Baker). He also was secretary-treasurer of the Arcade Loan Company and Lincoln Speedway, Inc., and a public administrator and sewer attorney in Logan County and the city of Lincoln respectively. He was elected as a Democrat to the Illinois House of Representatives in 1954 to serve the Decatur area, serving until 1961. In 1960, McCarthy was elected to the 28th Senatorial district, from which he was re-elected in 1964. He was redistricted into the 50th Senatorial District, from he was re-elected in 1966 and 1970. Finally, he was redistricted once more, into the 51st Senatorial District, from which he was re-elected in 1972. He would serve there until 1977, after losing a re-election bid in 1976 to Republican Decatur Mayor James H. Rupp. He returned to law practice after his legislative career.
