= Kenneth Hall (Illinois politician) =

American politician

Kenneth Hall Sr. (May 20, 1915 – March 21, 1995) was an American politician. A Democrat, he served in the Illinois House of Representatives and Illinois Senate.

== Biography ==
Hall was born in East St. Louis, Illinois. He went to Parks College in Cahokia, Illinois. Hall served in the Illinois House of Representatives from 1967 to 1971 and was a Democrat. He then served in the Illinois Senate from 1971 until his death in 1995. Hall was the first African-American to serve as assistant majority leader in the Illinois Senate. Hall died from pneumonia at the Saint Louis University Hospital in St. Louis, Missouri.

== Early Political Career ==
Mr. Hall was a Democratic Precinct Committeeman for several years and a former Chairman of the East St Louis City Democratic Central Committee. He was appointed to the State Rent Control Board by Governor Stevenson in 1949-1950. He was a Commissioner on the St Clair County Housing Authority for five years and served as Chairman for three years. He was also a member of the St Clair County Welfare Service Committee. He was elected as a Commissioner of the East St Louis Park District in 1959, and was also a former St. Clair County Sheriff’s Office Investigator.

== Legislative Career ==
Mr. Hall was elected to the Illinois House of Representatives in 1967 for two terms. He was then elected to the Illinois State Senate in 1970 and served there until his passing in 1995.

Senator Hall was the first African American to serve as an Illinois Senate Assistant Majority Leader. He also served as Chairman of the Illinois Senate Appropriations II Committee.

== Personal life ==
Former Licensed Insurance broker. Past Member: NAACP; 3rd degree Knights of Columbus; Serra Club, Kiwanis and St Clair and Madison County Urban League. Senator Hall Was a lifelong resident of East St Louis, along with his wife Anne and was the father of four sons, Thomas, Kenneth Jr., Maurice and Mark.
