= Arthur R. Gottschalk =

American lawyer, businessman, and politician (1925–2020)

Arthur R. Gottschalk (February 15, 1925 – June 17, 2020) was an American lawyer, businessman, and politician.

Gottschalk was born in Chicago, Illinois. He served in the United States Army during World War II. He went to Shrivenham American University in England while stationed in the United States Army. He graduated from University of Illinois at Urbana–Champaign and was admitted to the Illinois bar. Gottschalk practiced law in Chicago. He also served as vice president and attorney for the Reuben H. Donnelly Corporation. Gottschalk served as a police magistrate for Park Forest, Illinois and on the Park Forest Police and Fire Commission. Gottschalk served in the Illinois Senate from 1960 until 1969 and was a Republican. He also served as President of the Illinois Manufacturers Association. Gottschalk died at his home in Frankfort, Illinois.
