= Paul W. Broyles =

American businessman and politician (1896–1974)

Paul W. Broyles (February 3, 1896 – February 24, 1974) was an American businessman and politician.

Born on a farm near McLeansboro, Illinois, Broyles served in the United States Army during World War I. He lived in Mount Vernon, Illinois and owned a photography enlargement sales business. Broyles served in the Illinois House of Representatives from 1943 to 1945 and was a Republican. He then served in the Illinois Senate from 1945 to 1971. In 1947, Broyles established the Seditious Activities Investigation Commission, known as the Broyles Commission, to investigate and suppress Communist activities in the state of Illinois. J. B. Matthews, future chief investigator to the House Un-American Activities Committee, served as special consultant to the Commission. The Commission's enquiries were mainly directed at the University of Chicago and Roosevelt College. Broyles died at St. Luke's Hospital in St. Louis, Missouri.
