= Academy of General Dentistry =

Association of Canadian dentists

- Abbreviation: AGD
- Formation: August 2, 1952; 74 years ago
- Type: Professional association
- Tax ID no.: 36-6107533
- Legal status: 501(c)(6) professional association
- Headquarters: Chicago, Illinois, United States
- Coordinates: 41.8858501°N 87.6423476°W
- Region served: Canada and United States
- Members: 40,000+
- President: Marc J. Worob, DDS, FAGD
- Revenue: $14,770,506 (2014)
- Expenses: $13,155,120 (2014)
- Employees: 87 (2014)
- Volunteers: 375 (2014)
- Website: www.agd.org

The Academy of General Dentistry (AGD) is a professional association of general dentists from Canada and the United States.

== History and mission ==
The academy was incorporated on August 2, 1952.

Paula Jones became its first female president in 2008.

== Headquarters ==
The academy is headquartered in Chicago, Illinois, United States.

== Membership ==
It has 40,000 member dentists in the United States, Canada and in many countries across the globe.

== Publications ==
The AGD publishes two publications, General Dentistry, its bimonthly, peer-reviewed journal, and AGD Impact, the organization's monthly newsmagazine.

== Leadership ==
The AGD Executive Committee (EC) is composed of eight elected officers: the president-elect, vice president, secretary, treasurer, speaker of the House of Delegates, editor, and the immediate past president.
