= Thomas A. McGloon =

American lawyer and jurist

Thomas Arthur McGloon (December 18, 1911 – August 8, 1987) was an American lawyer and jurist.

Born in Chicago, Illinois, McGloon went to St. Viator High School. He served in the United States Navy during World War II. In 1935, McGloon graduated from DePaul University College of Law and practiced law. McGloon served in the Illinois State Senate from 1959 to 1970 and was a Democrat. In 1970, McGloon was elected to the Illinois Appellate Court. McGloon died at Oak Park Hospital in Oak Park, Illinois. His father was James C. McGloon who also served in the Illinois General Assembly.
