= 73rd Illinois General Assembly =

1963 legislative session

The 73rd Illinois General Assembly convened on January 9, 1963, and adjourned sine die on June 29, 1963. The General Assembly consists of the Illinois House of Representatives and the Illinois Senate.

== Legislation ==
The 73rd General Assembly introduced 2,916 bills, 1,678 in the House and 1,238 in the Senate. Of these, 1,383 were passed by both houses and sent to the governor. Governor Otto Kerner Jr. vetoed 232 in their entirety and 8 in part.
