= Iowa caucuses, 2012 =

Iowa caucuses, 2012 may refer to:

- Iowa Democratic caucuses, 2012
- Iowa Republican caucuses, 2012
