= 2012 Iowa Republican presidential caucuses =

- January 3, 2012
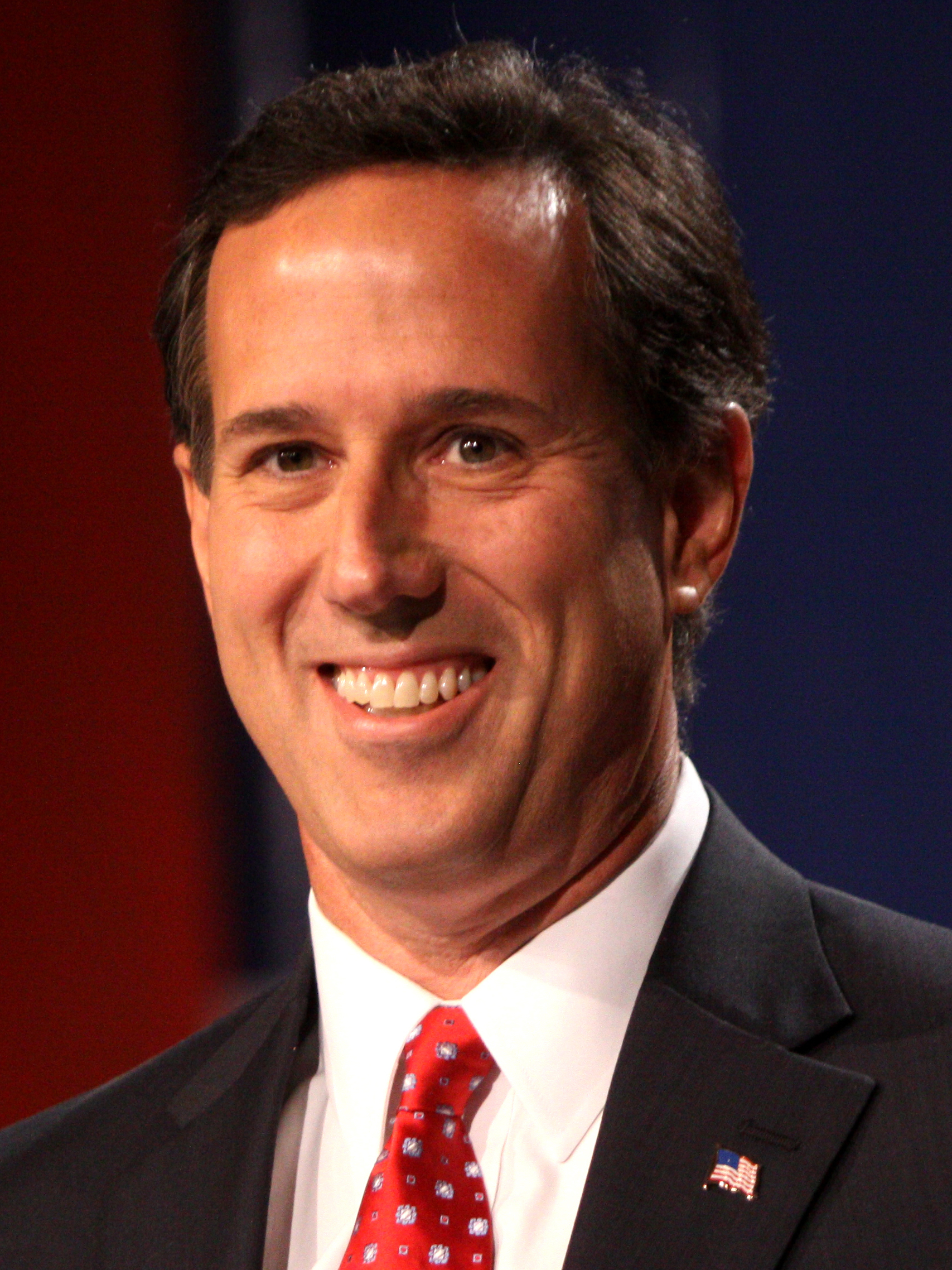

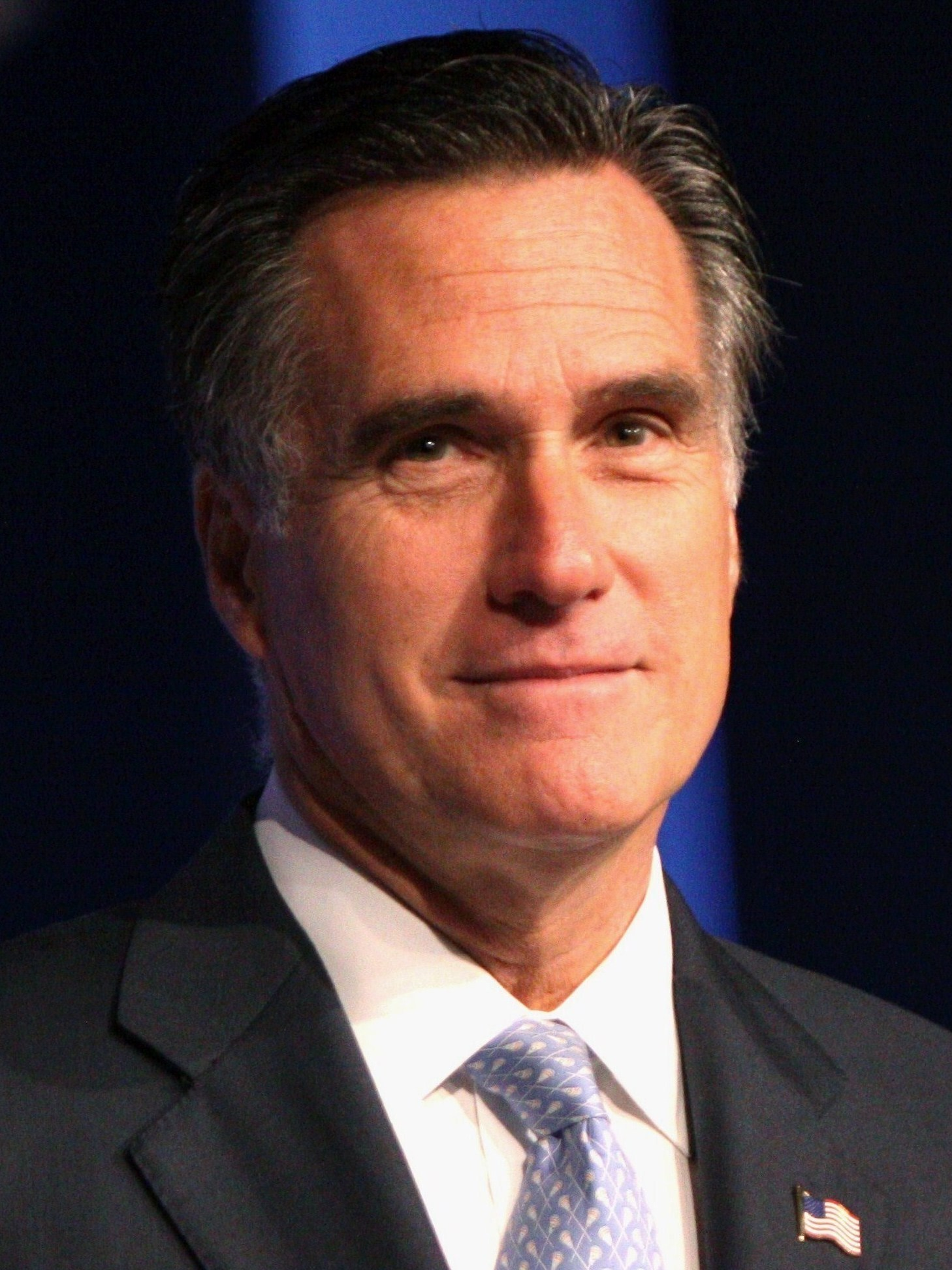

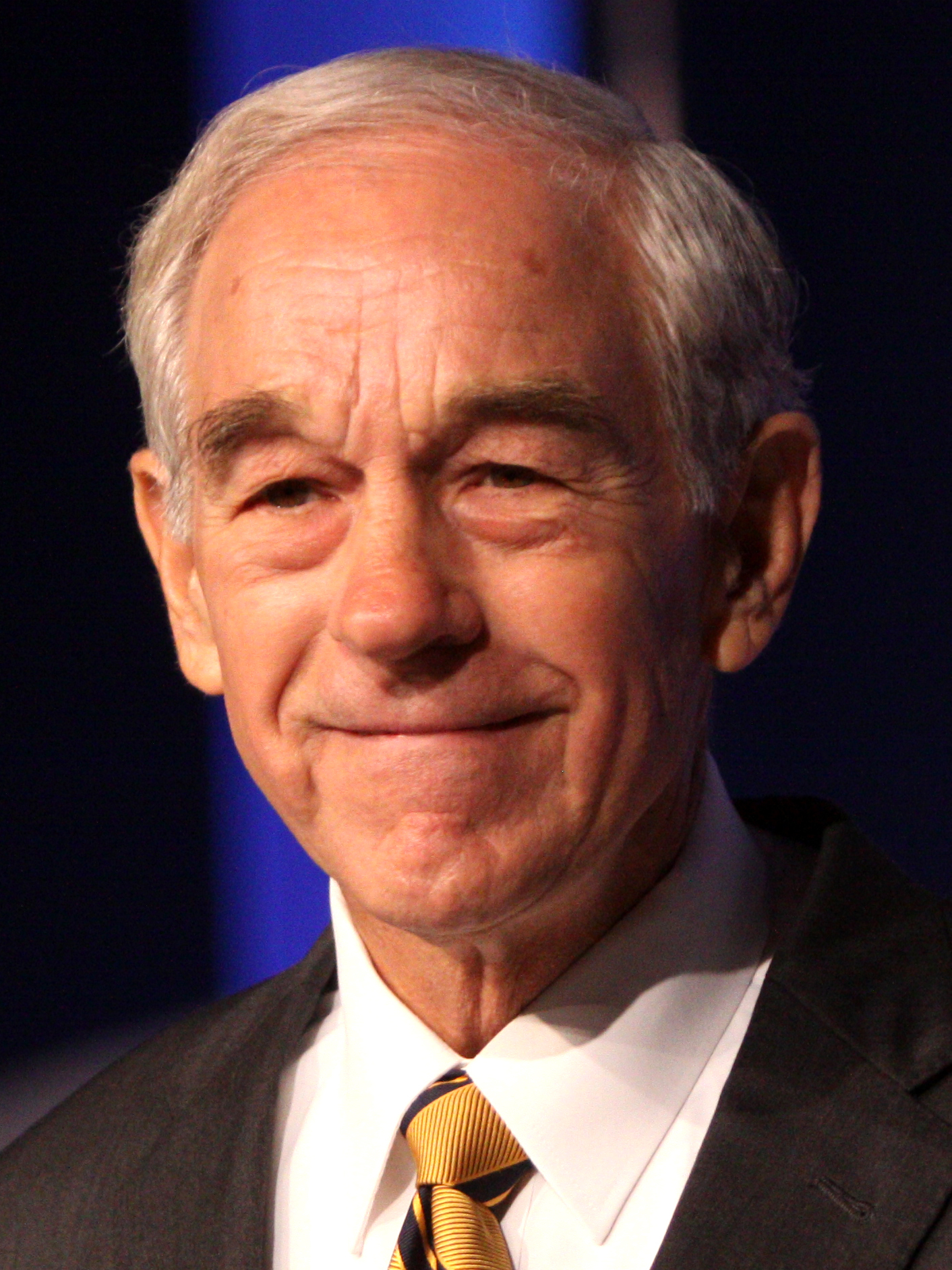

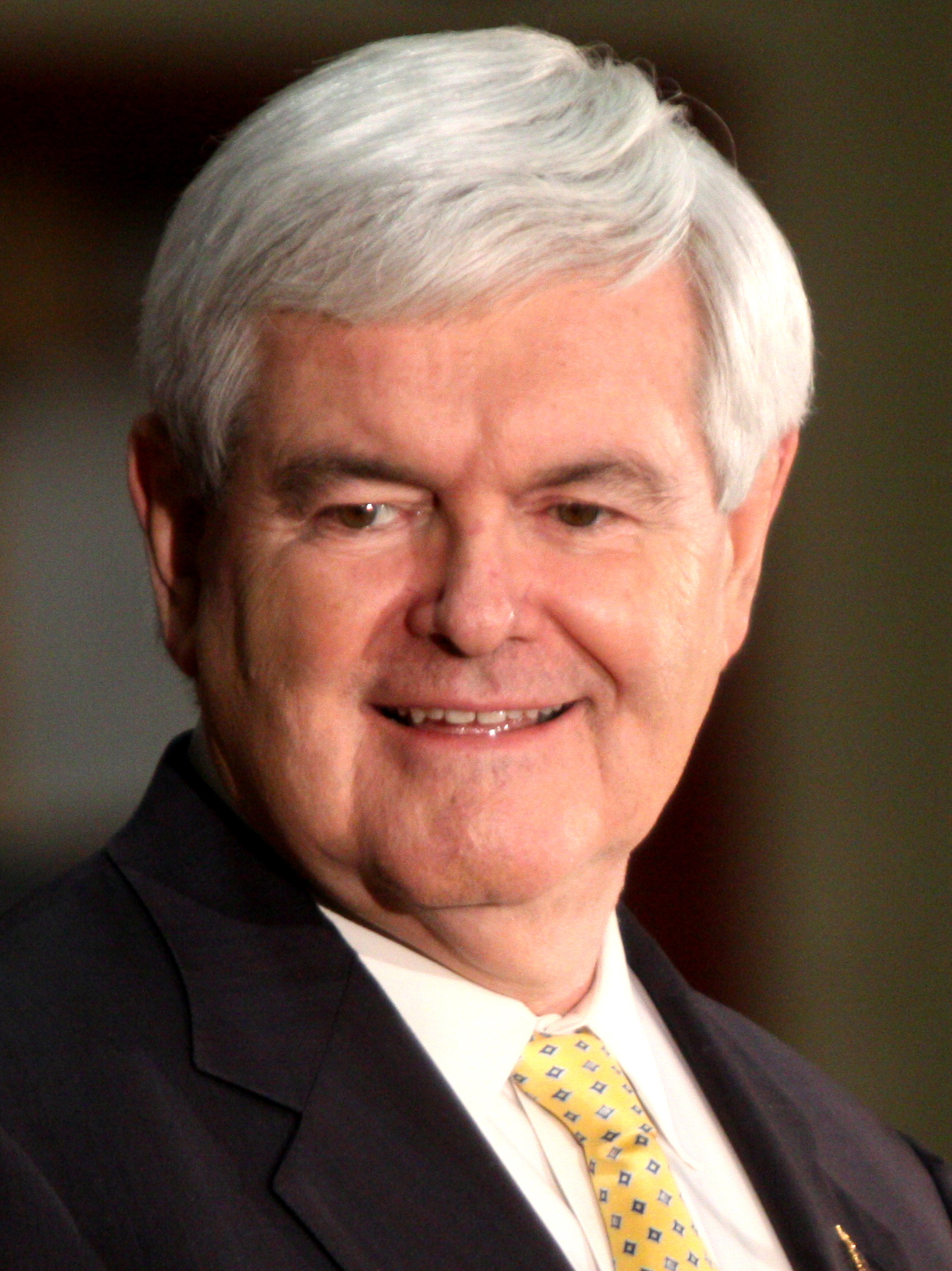

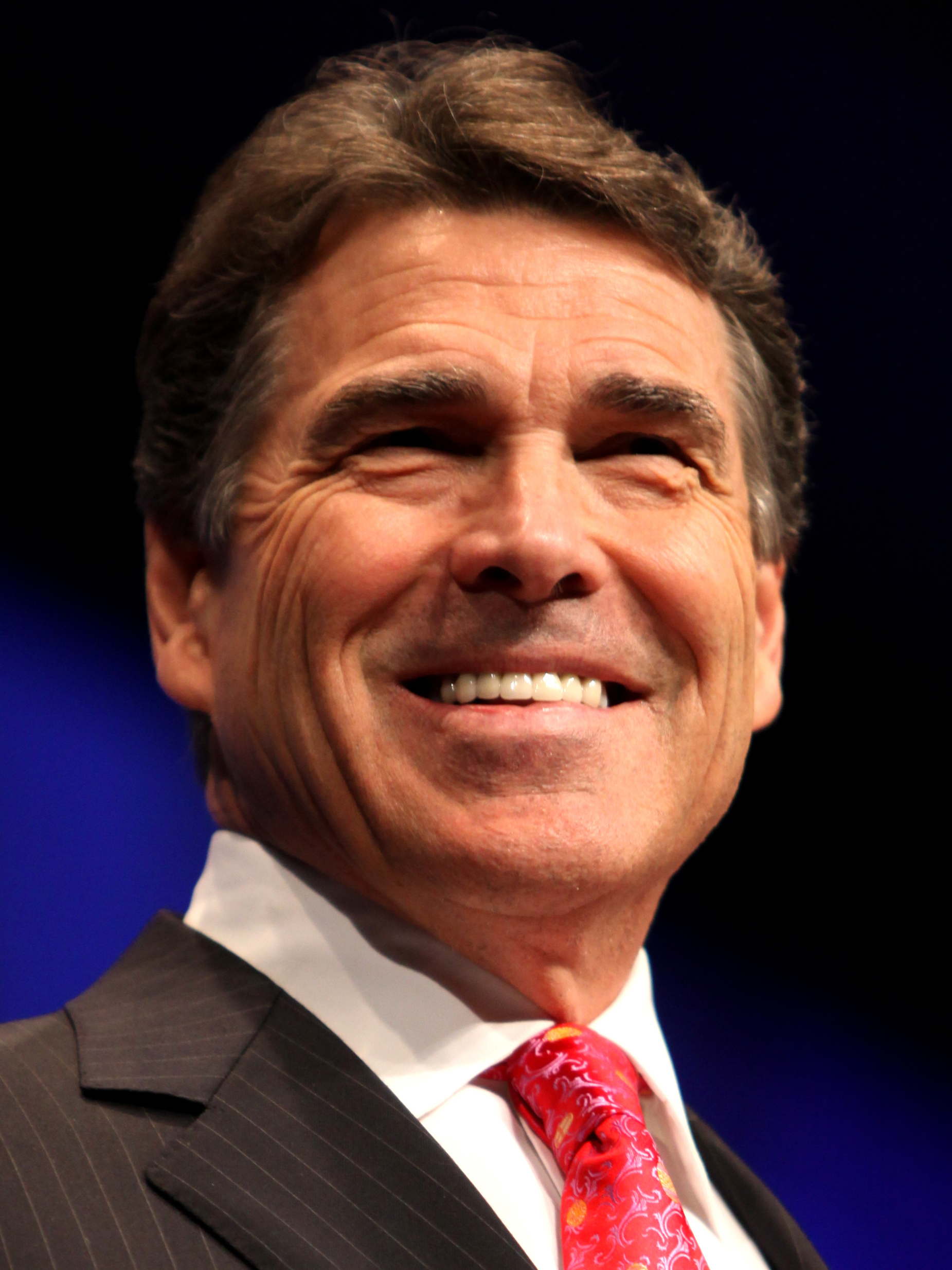

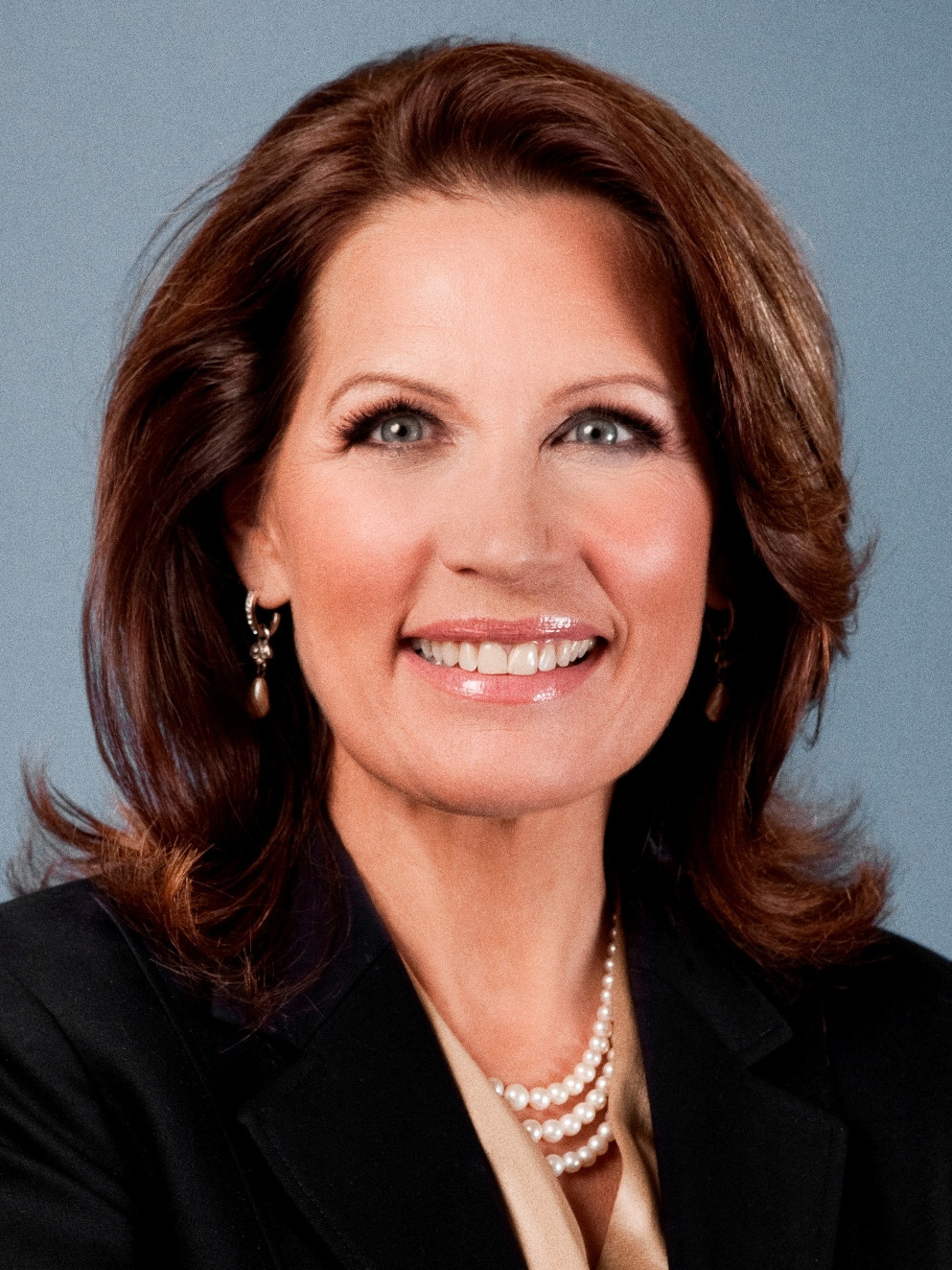
Candidate	Rick Santorum	Mitt Romney	Ron Paul
Home state	Pennsylvania	Massachusetts	Texas
Delegate count	0	6	22
Popular vote	29,839	29,805	26,036
Percentage	24.56%	24.53%	21.43%
Candidate	Newt Gingrich	Rick Perry	Michele Bachmann
Home state	Georgia	Texas	Minnesota
Delegate count	0	0	0
Popular vote	16,163	12,557	6,046
Percentage	13.30%	10.33%	4.98%
- Santorum: 20–30% 30–40% 40–50% 60–70% Romney: 20–30% 30–40% Paul: 20–30% 30–40% 40–50% Perry: 20–30% 30–40% Tie: 20–30%

The 2012 Iowa Republican presidential caucuses took place on January 3, 2012. Using the media's generally accepted definition of the Iowa Republican caucus as the non-binding secret polling at caucus sites and using the incomplete data available, the 2012 Iowa Republican caucus was the closest race in Iowa caucus history with only a thirty-four vote margin (about 3/100th of a percent) separating former senator Rick Santorum of Pennsylvania, who received 29,839 votes (24.56%), and former Massachusetts governor Mitt Romney, who received 29,805 votes (24.53%). Representative Ron Paul of Texas ran a close third, receiving 26,036 votes (21.43%).

Trailing were former speaker of the House Newt Gingrich (16,163 votes, 13.30%), Texas governor Rick Perry (12,557 votes, 10.33%), and representative Michele Bachmann (6,046 votes, 4.98%). Former Utah governor and ambassador to China Jon Huntsman Jr., who skipped campaigning in Iowa to focus on the New Hampshire primary, received 739 votes (0.61%).

In total, 121,501 votes were recorded, setting a record for Iowa Republican caucus turnout; this record was broken in the 2016 election by more than 60,000 votes. However, this total was still far less than the all-time Iowa caucus record in the 2008 Iowa Democratic caucuses, in which 239,000 Democrats voted. The 121,501 votes represent 19.8 percent of active registered Republicans in the state and just 5.4 percent of all Iowans eligible to vote.

However, the vote totals of eight precincts were never counted, so vote totals were not precisely known. The secret polling results at Republican caucus sites were unrelated to the delegate selection process in 2012, although this has been changed for the 2016 election cycle onward.

If the Iowa 2012 Republican caucuses were regarded as the start of the Republican delegate selection process for the 2012 United States presidential election, the real caucus process was the election of Republican delegates to the county conventions, who would eventually determine the delegates at the state convention in June 2012. This would, in turn, determine the Iowa delegates who would attend the Republican National Convention in August 2012.

This process rewarded campaign organizations that could not only get supporters to the caucus sites, but get supporters who would be willing to serve as delegates to county conventions and beyond. As a result, Paul was ultimately able to win 22 of the 28 delegates to the national convention and Romney won the other six.

The 2011–2012 pre-caucus poll results for Iowa had highly volatile results; Gallup polls showed the leading candidate in Iowa change seven times from May 2011 until the caucuses. The 2012 caucuses also set a new record for political expenditures, with $12 million being spent, two-thirds of it from super PACs which dominated the campaigns by running highly negative attack ads.

In the August 13 Ames Straw Poll, a traditional straw poll held in Iowa Republican caucuses, Bachmann narrowly defeated Paul, with Minnesota governor Tim Pawlenty trailing in third. Following his disappointing showing, Pawlenty dropped out of the race.

Three candidates' debates were held in Iowa over the course the campaign: one on August 11 in Ames ahead of the straw poll; one on December 10, 2011, in Des Moines, and one on December 15 in Sioux City. Several other joint candidates' appearances took place during the caucus campaign outside Iowa.

== Campaign ==
=== Early race ===
Considered a frontrunner for the 2012 nomination, former Governor of Arkansas Mike Huckabee, who was the winner of the Iowa Republican caucuses in 2008, was the leader in every statewide poll conducted in the state in 2010, and early 2011. Huckabee decided against a second bid, however, announcing the decision on his Fox News show Huckabee on May 14, 2011, stating "All the factors say go, but my heart says no, and that's the decision that I've made." Following his decision, former Governor of Massachusetts Mitt Romney became the frontrunner in polls conducted within the state in the weeks following, despite only appearing in Iowa a handful of times, and refusing to participate in the state's Ames Straw Poll in August 2011.

This trend only lasted for a couple months, however, when support for Congresswoman Michele Bachmann began to increase, due in large part to the support she was able to garner through the Tea Party movement, of which she was a founding member of the Tea Party Caucus in the United States House of Representatives. Bachmann also strongly played up the fact that she was born in Waterloo, Iowa, where she also officially kicked off her candidacy, before eventually moving to Minnesota with her family when she became a teenager.

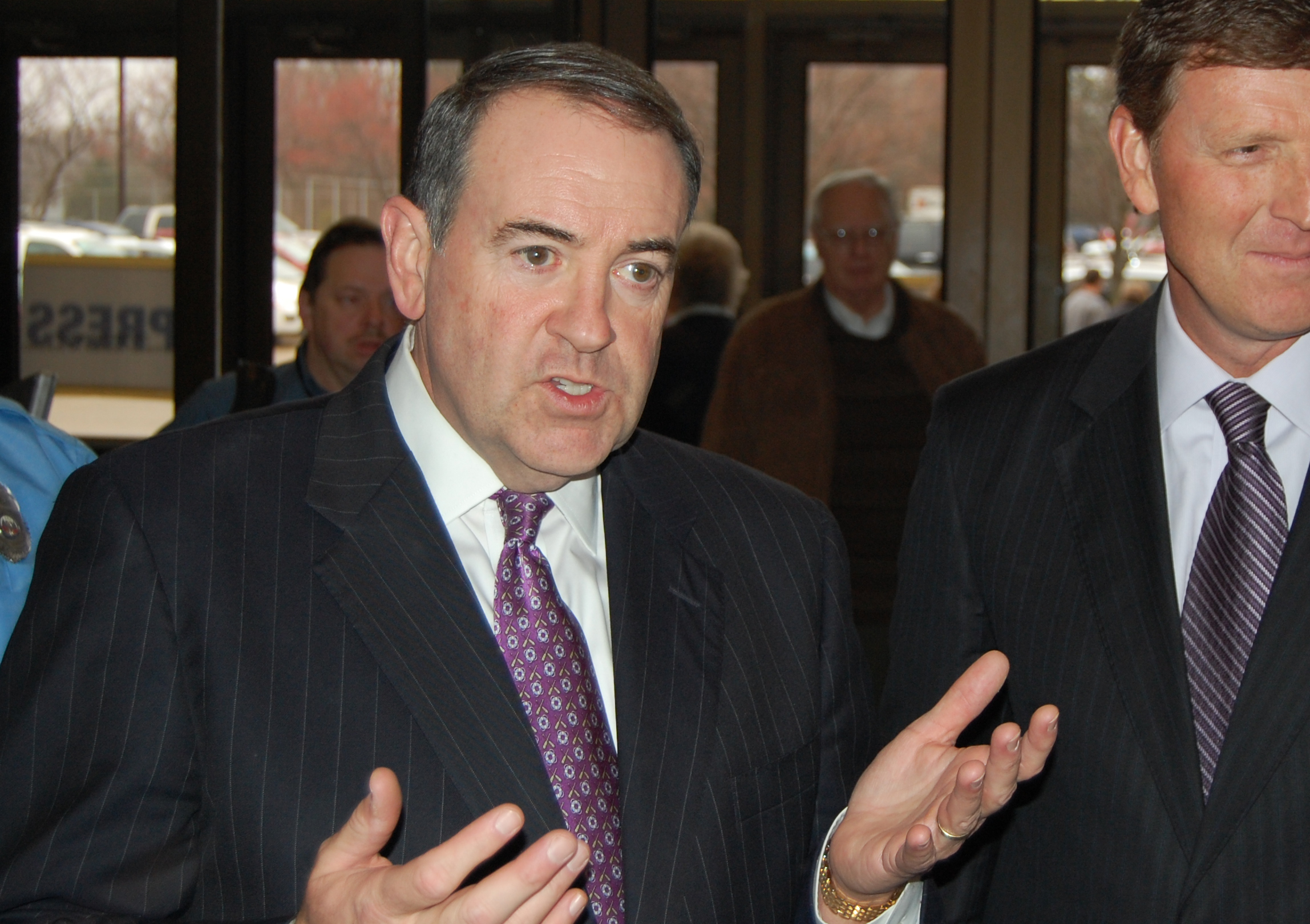
Former Governor of Arkansas Mike Huckabee at a fundraiser in Beaverdale, Iowa in November 2010

In addition to Huckabee, several other potential candidates visited Iowa, including former Governor of Alaska Sarah Palin, Governor of Indiana Mitch Daniels, former Governor of New York George Pataki, Senator John Thune of South Dakota, Governor of Mississippi Haley Barbour, Senator Jim DeMint of South Carolina, and Governor of New Jersey Chris Christie all decided against bids for president, despite receiving earlier speculation. Businessman Donald Trump, who also briefly flirted with the possibility of a bid for president, had sent several aides to Iowa, but ultimately decided against a bid.

Unlike the 2008 presidential election, when many of the potential candidates had announced their bids by February 2007, the only major candidate to announce their intentions as to whether they would form an exploratory committee for President of the United States was businessman Herman Cain on January 12, 2011, after having toured Iowa, speaking to various Republican Party groups and leaders, as well as leaders in the Tea Party movement. The first official visit to Iowa by Cain, as a presidential candidate, was on March 7, 2011, during a conference hosted by the Iowa Faith and Freedom Coalition, along with former Speaker of the House Newt Gingrich and former Governor Buddy Roemer, who also announced their own exploratory committees to run for president four days earlier.

Former Governor Tim Pawlenty, and former Senator Rick Santorum also participated in the event, though they had yet to announce their intentions to run for president. Following the conference, Pawlenty officially announced his bid on March 21, 2011, and made his first visit to Iowa as a presidential candidate on April 1, 2011, speaking with Republican Party leaders in Newton, Iowa. Santorum would also announce his own exploratory committee on April 13, 2011, and made his first visit as a candidate on April 25, 2011.

The next day, Congressman Ron Paul announced his exploratory committee to run for president in Des Moines, Iowa. He had visited the state several times before, including meeting with Governor of Iowa Terry Branstad a month earlier. Former Governor Mitt Romney, who announced his exploratory committee by posting a video on YouTube on April 11, 2011, failed to make his first appearance in Iowa until May 27, 2011, visiting Ankeny, Des Moines and Cedar Rapids.

A month later, Congresswoman Michele Bachmann made her first visit to Iowa as a candidate on June 26, 2011, when she officially announced her campaign in Waterloo, Iowa. Former Governor Jon Huntsman, who announced his campaign in front of the Statue of Liberty on June 21, 2011, was the final then-announced candidate to visit Iowa, making his first speech at a soapbox event held by the Des Moines Register at the Iowa State Fair on August 11, 2011.

==== Date of caucuses ====
The 2012 Iowa Republican caucuses were originally scheduled to begin on February 6, 2012, much later than the date in 2008, which almost immediately followed the beginning of the year in January 2008. On September 29, 2011, the entire schedule of caucuses and primaries was disrupted, however, when it was announced that the Republican Party of Florida had decided to move up its primary to January 31, in an attempt to bring attention to its own primary contest, and attract the presidential candidates to visit the state.

Because of the move, the Republican National Committee decided to strip Florida of half of its delegates. Also as a result, the Iowa Republican Party, along with New Hampshire, South Carolina and Nevada then sought to move their caucuses back into early January. All but Nevada, who agreed to follow Florida, confirmed their caucus and primary dates to take place throughout January, with Iowa deciding to hold their contest on January 3, 2012.

=== Ames Straw Poll ===
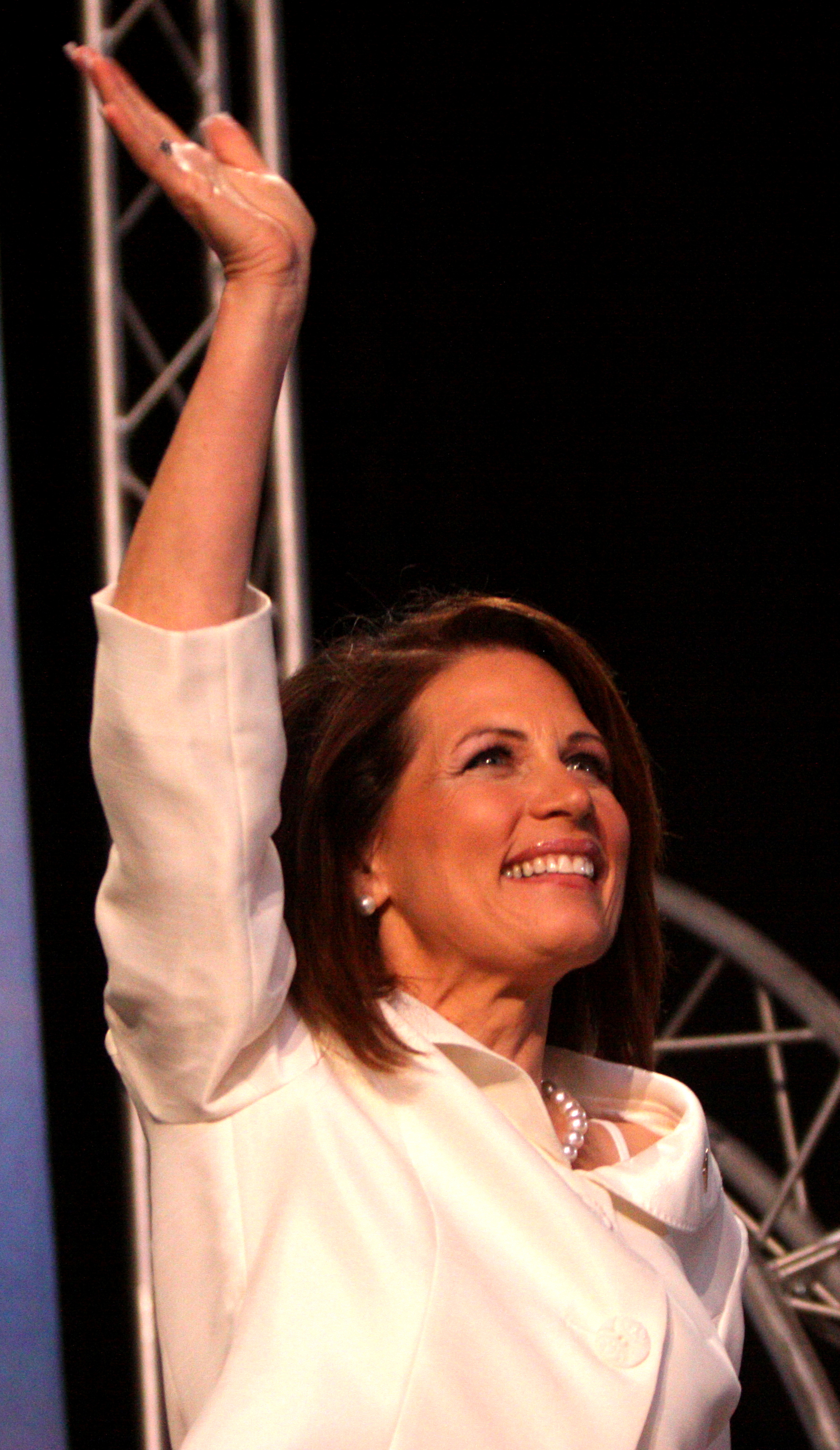
Michele Bachmann speaking at the Ames Straw Poll on August 13, 2011

As the Ames Straw Poll approached in August 2011, visits and spending by the campaigns dramatically increased. Several candidates, including Bachmann, Congressman Ron Paul, former Senator Rick Santorum, Congressman Thaddeus McCotter, former Governor Tim Pawlenty, and businessman Herman Cain made bids for spots to compete at the straw poll. Congressman Paul bid the most, and was awarded the prime spot at the straw poll, which Mitt Romney occupied in 2007, and eventually led to his victory.

A representative for Former Speaker of the House Newt Gingrich was also present, but due to his campaign facing large amounts of debt, did not place a bid, and was not given a spot at the straw poll. The rest of the candidates who did place a bid spent millions attempting to win the poll, with Bachmann, Paul and Pawlenty spending the most money, performing various get out the vote efforts, and visiting the state dozens of times in the weeks leading up to the straw poll.

Two days before the straw poll, the third official Republican debate was held at Iowa State University in Ames, sponsored by the Republican Party of Iowa, Fox News, and The Washington Examiner. Candidates participating in the debate included Michele Bachmann, Herman Cain, Newt Gingrich, Ron Paul, Tim Pawlenty, Mitt Romney, Jon Huntsman and Rick Santorum. The debate was noted for the sparring between Bachmann and Pawlenty, with Pawlenty criticized Bachmann for what he said was a lack of leadership, while Bachmann fired back that Pawlenty's support for cap and trade legislation and the individual mandate while governor of Minnesota made his record look like Obama's.

Gingrich criticized Wallace by saying he was asking "gotcha questions" instead of legitimate questions. Romney responded to criticisms of his Massachusetts health care reform, and its similarity to the Patient Protection and Affordable Care Act, termed "Obamacare" by its opponent. Santorum stated his view that same-sex marriage is not a state issue, because the 10th Amendment "does not give states the right to trample over moral law". Romney agreed that it is a federal issue, reasoning that people move to different states and that marriage is a status, not an activity that takes place within the walls of a state. Huntsman and Paul reiterated their support for civil unions.

On Saturday, August 13, 2011, the straw poll was conducted on the campus of Iowa State University at the Hilton Coliseum in Ames, Iowa, with Bachmann narrowly defeating Paul, and former Governor Tim Pawlenty in third place. The 2011 straw poll had the second highest turnout in history, second only to 1999 straw poll, when then-Governor George W. Bush won in a landslide. Governor Rick Perry, who announced the day of the straw poll in South Carolina, but whose name did not appear on the ballot, received a significant number of write-in votes, placing in sixth. Other non-participating candidates, such as Mitt Romney, Newt Gingrich, and former Governor of Utah Jon Huntsman, performed poorly in the straw poll, placing a distant seventh, eighth, and ninth respectively.

=== Post-straw poll ===
Following the straw poll, support of Congresswoman Michele Bachmann continued to grow, as the media focused on what they deemed the "new top tier" of Bachmann, Rick Perry and Mitt Romney. This drew criticism from the supporters of Congressman Ron Paul, as well as comedian Jon Stewart on his program The Daily Show, who pointed out Paul's near tie with Bachmann in the poll, and subsequent lack of coverage of the candidate by the media. Bachmann's support in polls following Ames began to fall, however, with Rick Perry's support growing in the state following his entrance to the race. His first visit to the state as a presidential candidate was at an event held on August 14, 2011, in Waterloo, Iowa, which Bachmann also attended.

The same day, former Governor Tim Pawlenty of Minnesota announced his intentions to withdraw from the race, as a result of placing a distant third in the Ames Straw Poll. Congressman Thaddeus McCotter also dropped out of the race a month after the straw poll, calling his presidential bid the "worst 15 minutes of [his] life".

Going into September, media coverage of subsequent debates held in Simi Valley, California, Tampa and Orlando, Florida focused on Rick Perry's poor performance in those debates, and eventually led to a significant drop in his support in statewide polls conducted in both Iowa, as well as nationwide. This also coincided with the introduction of the 9–9–9 plan by fellow candidate businessman Herman Cain, who then saw a sharp rise in the polls, putting him in a virtual tie with Mitt Romney. In the weeks following, Cain was the subject of a scandal involving accusations of sexual harassment during his tenure at the National Restaurant Association, as well as an accusation that he had participated in a 13-year affair with an Atlanta businesswoman.

Subsequent statewide polling then saw a surge among several candidates, including Newt Gingrich and Ron Paul, who would both surge in the final weeks before the caucuses. On December 3, 2011, in Atlanta, Georgia, Herman Cain officially announced the suspension of his campaign, due to the various allegations of sexual harassment, a 13-year affair, and personal attacks on his family. Soon thereafter it was reported that Cain would endorse Gingrich the following Monday, but it proved to be untrue, with Cain refusing to endorse any other candidates. Despite the suspension of his campaign, the Republican Party of Iowa still reported write-in caucus vote totals for Cain.

=== Final debates ===
On December 10, 2011, the first of two final debates to be conducted in Iowa before the caucuses was held, and hosted by ABC News, The Des Moines Register, and the Iowa Republican Party. The debate was the first to occur following Cain's campaign suspension, with Michele Bachmann, Newt Gingrich, Ron Paul, Rick Perry, Mitt Romney and Rick Santorum participating in the debate. Jon Huntsman, who had refused to contest Iowa, instead focusing his efforts on winning the New Hampshire primary, was not invited to participate in the debate, and did not meet the debate organizer's criteria of participation.

The debate was also one of the first to occur following Gingrich's surge in the statewide polls in Iowa, as well as nationwide. It was focused on various economic, foreign, and domestic issues, with Gingrich facing most of the criticism from his fellow competitors. Romney mocked Gingrich's plan to build a lunar colony to mine minerals from the Moon, saying that the real difference between the two of them was their backgrounds, saying "I spent my life in the private sector. I know how the economy works."

Gingrich replied, "Let's be candid. The only reason you didn't become a career politician is you lost to Teddy Kennedy in 1994", which drew boos and laughter from the audience. Romney replied "If I'd have beaten Ted Kennedy I could have been a career politician, that's probably true. If I would've been able to get in the NFL like I hoped when I was a kid, I would have been a football star all my life too." Mitt Romney later received criticism when he attempted to bet fellow candidate Rick Perry $10,000, when discussing the issue of his past support of a healthcare mandate, which Perry had pointed out was removed from his book.

Other participants, including Ron Paul, who had also seen a significant surge in polls in the state, criticized Gingrich for his participation as a consultant for mortgage company Freddie Mac, during which he was paid $1.6 million, shortly before its collapse and subsequent bail out by the federal government. Michele Bachmann also attacked Gingrich, after he refused to call himself a lobbyist, saying, "You don't need to be within the technical definition of a lobbyist to still be influence peddling."

A second debate was held on December 15, 2011, and took place in Sioux City, Iowa. It was hosted by Fox News and the Iowa Republican Party, and moderated by Bret Baier. Participants in the debate included Michele Bachmann, Newt Gingrich, Jon Huntsman, Ron Paul, Rick Perry, Mitt Romney and Rick Santorum. Newt Gingrich was once again the main focus of his competitors, and continued to receive criticism for his past dealing with Freddie Mac.

Ron Paul was also challenged for his stance on Iran, and was criticized by Michele Bachmann, who Paul refuted by continuing to state his position that sanctions are an act of war, and the prospect of Iran possibly having a nuclear weapon is similar to the war propaganda that preceded the war in Iraq. Paul continued, "I don't want Iran to have a nuclear weapon. I would like to reduce them because there would be less chance of war. But to declare war on 1.2 billion Muslims and say all Muslims are the same, this is dangerous talk. Yeah, there are some radicals. But they don't come here to kill us because we're free and prosperous. Do they go to Switzerland and Sweden? That is absurd."

Paul also stated, "why do we have 900 bases in 130 countries and we're totally bankrupt. How do you rebuild a military when we have no money? How are we going to take care of the people? I think this wild goal to have another war in the name of defense is the dangerous thing. The danger is really us overreacting. We need a strong national defense, and we need to only go to war with a declaration of war." Later in the debate, Rick Perry received attention when he called himself the "Tim Tebow of the Iowa caucuses," when asked how he would compete against President Barack Obama in a general election debate.

Mitt Romney received praise for his performance in the debate, who largely focused on criticizing President Obama, rather than his opponents. One exchange involved Obama's lack of response towards a drone being taken down in Iran, with Romney stating, "This is a president — with the — the spy drone being brought down, he says pretty please? A foreign policy based on pretty please? You got to be kidding."

=== Final weeks of campaign ===
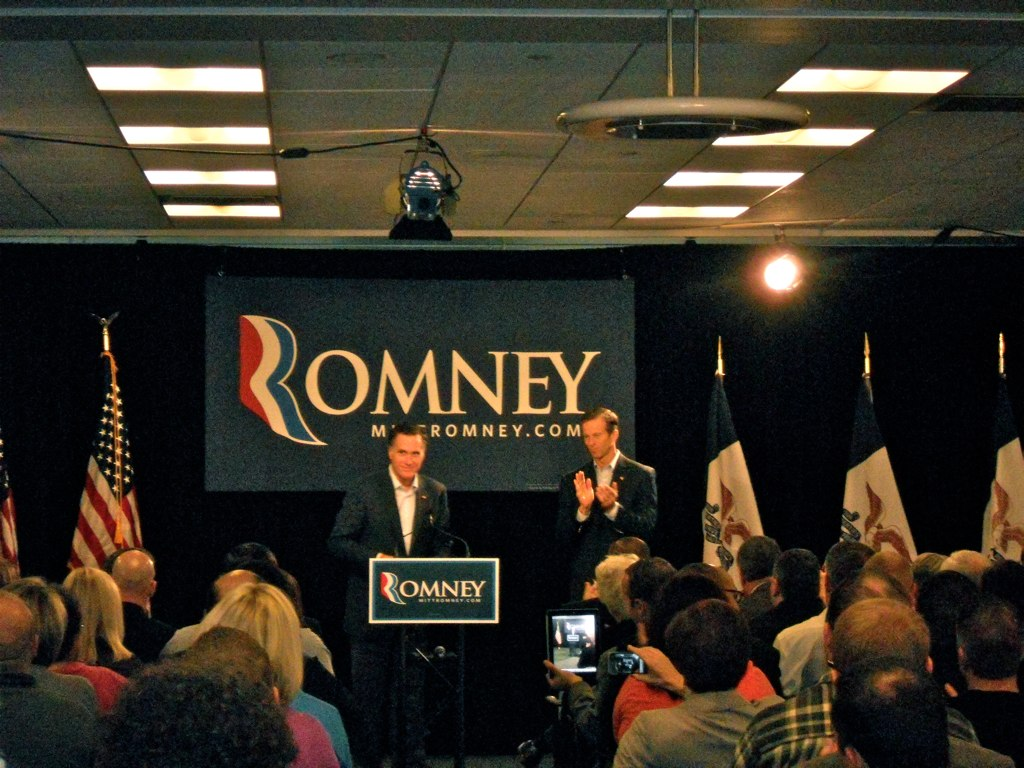
Before the Iowa Caucus, presidential candidate Mitt Romney taking questions in Des Moines, Iowa. November 22, 2011

In the final weeks leading up to the caucuses, a majority of the candidates spent a large amount of time campaigning in the state, with Michele Bachmann and Rick Perry touring the state on their own respective bus tours. Bachmann visited all 99 of the state's counties in a ten-day sweep through the state. Other candidates, including Ron Paul, Newt Gingrich and Rick Santorum, also held several events throughout the state to meet with voters. Mitt Romney also visited the state, but spent most of December focusing his efforts on the New Hampshire primary instead. Jon Huntsman also decided to focus on the New Hampshire primary, and did not campaign in Iowa.

Polling in the final weeks saw a surge of support for Ron Paul, with Gingrich's support beginning to falter. Support for Mitt Romney also stayed somewhat steady, and Bachmann, Perry, and Santorum were all mostly tied in the second-tier. A poll conducted by Public Policy Polling between December 16 until December 18, 2011, showed Paul with the lead for the first time, with 23% of likely caucus-goers supporting him. Romney fell close behind with 20%, and Gingrich saw a steep drop in support with 14%, largely due to the increase of negative advertisements being bought against him in the state's media market by his opponents.

Another poll conducted by Iowa State University, KCRG-TV and The Gazette between December 8–18, 2011, also found Paul in the lead with 27.5% of support, with Gingrich close behind at 25.3%. Yet another poll conducted by Rasmussen Reports on December 19, 2011, found Mitt Romney with the most support at 25%, with Paul close behind at 20%, and Gingrich at 16%. Fundraising for Paul also increased in December, when his campaign raised more than $4 million in one "moneybomb" over a weekend.

Shortly prior to the caucus date, an unofficial campaign to urge voters to write in Sarah Palin began running radio and television ads in Iowa. The ads argued that Palin is the only candidate who can stop crony capitalism. The final week before the caucus witnessed a surprise surge in the polls for Santorum, who rose from singled digits earlier to 15% behind Paul at 22% and Romney at 24%.

==== Unexpected performance by Santorum ====
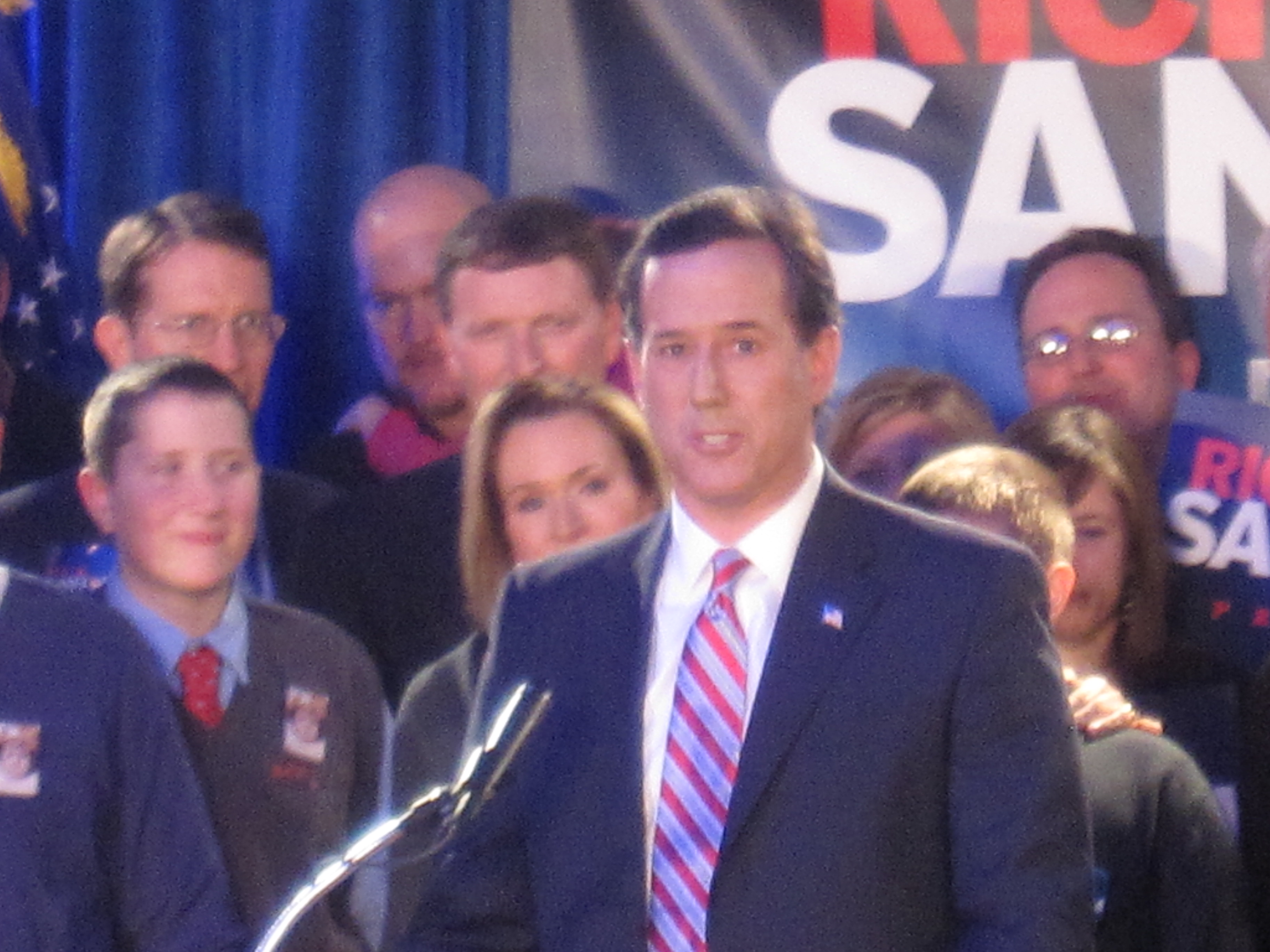
Santorum delivering a caucus-night victory speech

Santorum spent months in Iowa, traveling to all 99 counties and holding some 381 town hall meetings over the course of the campaign. However, for months Santorum lagged in the polls and had difficulty raising money, traveling around the state in a pickup truck instead of buses and caravans used by other candidates. He lagged in the so-called second tier of candidates, polling in the single digits in Iowa as late as December 18. However, his surge began around that time, as numerous polls put him in the top three along with Romney and Paul.

According to the Los Angeles Times, "Santorum caught fire at just the right time as social conservatives in the state and other undecided voters appeared to gravitate his way in large numbers at the expense of candidates" such as Gingrich, Perry, and Bachmann.

==== Campaign spending and super PACs ====
The Iowa race was dominated by a large volume of negative or attack advertising paid for by "super PACs" supporting candidates. Total political expenditures in Iowa set a new record, totaling over $12 million, with an estimated two-thirds coming from super PACs. (Unlike contributions directly to candidate funds, which have a $2,500 contribution limit and must disclose all contributors, super PACs may raise unlimited amounts of money and may keep contributors anonymous). Some $10 million was spent in television advertising by candidates and super PACs across the state by the end of 2011.

Former journalist David Yepsen, who covered nine Iowa caucuses for the Des Moines Register before joining the Paul Simon Public Policy Institute at Southern Illinois University Carbondale, told The Boston Globe: "It's hard to figure out who is doing the attacking and to what end, and they're double-barreling the attacks on two or more candidates. I've never seen that before. We've never had this volume [of negative ads] or this much complexity."

Romney's campaign was by far the largest overall spender, and Romney's "Restore Our Future" super PAC spent $4 million in attack ads against Gingrich beginning on December 9. The "Restore Our Future" negative television advertising and direct mail campaign was said to be "unprecedented" and "unlike anything in Iowa caucus history" and was credited with Gingrich's precipitous drop in the polls from front-runner into fourth-place finisher. By December 27, $2.86 million had been spent on television advertising by the Perry campaign, and $2.85 million had been spent by the pro-Romney "Restore Our Future" PAC.

The New York Times reported that Romney "effectively outsourced his negative advertising to a group that has raised millions of dollars from his donors to inundate his opponents with attacks - all without breaking the rules that forbid super PACs to explicitly coordinate with the candidates". The Detroit Free Press editorialized that "No one exploited the new no-limits-or-accountability playing field more shamelessly or effectively than [Romney]. His campaign mounted a sunny, Morning in America-style ad blitz, while super PACs founded and directed by longtime Romney loyalists buried the governor's GOP rivals in televised slime."

On January 1, ahead of the caucuses, Gingrich stated that Romney would "buy an election if he could". In the final days of the campaign and immediately after the results came in, Gingrich expressed anger toward Romney and the negative "Restore Our Future" campaign, stating that in the future "We are not going to go out and run nasty ads, but I do reserve the right to tell the truth ... If the truth seems negative, that may be more a comment on his [Romney’s] record than the nature of politics."

A study conducted by Kantar Media's Campaign Media Analysis Group showed that by December 30, some 45 percent of all television ads in Iowa were negative ads against Gingrich; 20 percent were negative ads against Romney; 10% were positive ads for Romney; 6% were positive ads for Gingrich; 8% were negative ads against Perry; 8% were positive ads for Perry; and 3% were positive ads for Paul. Gingrich was the only candidate of the five leading candidates to face a net financial disadvantage in terms of ad money spent (as a percent of total ad money spent in Iowa) verses percent of ads run against that candidate: Gingrich was at -35%, Santorum as +4%, Romney at +10%, Paul at +17%, and Perry at +31% (the largest net financial advantage).

According to data compiled by BuzzFeed, for every $1,000 spent on advertising by their campaigns, Santorum received 49 votes; Gingrich received 11 votes; Paul received 10 votes; Romney received six votes; and Perry received two votes. For every one vote received, Perry's campaign spent $478.40 in paid media, Romney spent $154.90, Paul spent $103.30, Gingrich spent $89.74, Santorum spent $20.50, and Bachmann spent $3.95. This makes the average "price per vote" about $130, taking in account only media spending.

== Endorsements ==
Romney was endorsed by three of the state's five largest newspapers: The Des Moines Register, the Quad City Times, and the Sioux City Journal. The two other large state newspapers, the Cedar Rapids Gazette and the Waterloo Cedar Fall Courier, did not endorse any candidate.

Few major endorsements were made by major Iowa Republican elected officials. Iowa's governor Terry Branstad endorsed no candidate. Similarly, Senator Chuck Grassley chose not to endorse any candidate. On January 2, U.S. Representative Steve King said on Simon Conway's program on WHO Radio that he would not endorse before the caucuses.

On December 9, Iowa Secretary of State Matt Schultz endorsed Santorum. Prominent Christian right figures Bob Vander Plaats of The Family Leader (who unsuccessfully sought the Republican nomination for governor of Iowa in 2010) and Chuck Hurley of the Iowa Family Policy Center endorsed Santorum on December 20.

Iowa House Speaker Kraig Paulsen endorsed Gingrich.

== Election ==
Election Day was a "balmy January day by Iowa standards" with temperatures of up to 35 degrees in central Iowa and "occasional gusts of wind," more favorable weather than in the 2008 caucuses, with temperatures of 4 degrees.

=== Candidates on ballot ===
The Republican Party of Iowa announced on December 29, 2011, that they would report vote totals for the following candidates: Michele Bachmann, Herman Cain, Newt Gingrich, Jon Huntsman, Ron Paul, Rick Perry, Buddy Roemer, Mitt Romney, and Rick Santorum. Vote counts for "No Preference" and "Other" were also reported.

The eight names were listed on the ballot in alphabetical order. Cain was included on the ballot although he had dropped out of the race because the names were finalized before Cain suspended his campaign.

=== Allegations of irregularities and results certification ===
On January 5 following the caucuses, Des Moines radio station KCCI first reported that caucus-goer Edward True, stated in an affidavit that at his 53-person caucus at the Garrett Memorial Library in Moulton in Appanoose County that he was one of three people who had helped in counting the results and had written the results down on a piece of paper to post to Facebook, but later discovered that the reported count was inaccurate. According to True's affidavit, Romney had actually received just two votes, but had been credited with 22 votes: "53 caucus-goers had cast votes in his precinct, rather than 79 as reported by the state. The 26-vote difference reflects what he says were 20 excess votes for Mr. Romney and six for Mr. Roemer." If true, this would change the statewide results from an eight-vote victory for Romney into a 12-vote victory for Santorum. Statistician Nate Silver notes that Romney had performed poorly in other Appanoose County precincts, receiving two of 39 votes in one, four of 43 votes in another, and none of 40 votes in a third, and also commented that it was unusual that obscure candidate Buddy Roemer, who received just 31 votes statewide, was credited with six votes in one precinct. Silver also pointed out that one precinct in Appanoose County, Pleasant Franklin, reported no turnout at all, although it was listed as a valid caucus site and 132 voters cast ballots for John McCain in the 2008 general election there. Pleasant Franklin was one of eight precincts throughout that state that were listed by the state party but were reported as having no Republican turnout. Some have suggested that since minor counting errors are common, it is plausible that the lost votes could be canceled out by a similar error at another caucus location. However, Silver noted the exceptional closeness of the race and noted on January 5 that "For now, the caucuses are probably best thought of as still being too close to call."

True, who is a Ron Paul supporter, stated to KCCI that: "This is huge. It essentially changes who won." A Republican Party of Iowa spokesman stated that since True is neither a precinct captain nor county chairperson, he has "no business" talking about election results. On January 5, the Iowa Republican Party released a written statement in which they refused to respond to reports of the irregularity and stated that did not have "any reason to believe the final, certified results of Appanoose County" would change the outcome.

Santorum stated on January 6 that the report of the irregularities "doesn't really matter to me," citing the virtually tied results. Counties had up to two weeks from the date of the caucuses to transmit their final certified results to the state Republican Party. While there are no recount provisions for caucus results in Iowa Republican party rules, there was a certification process, which was described as "nearly the same thing".

On January 16, it was reported that there was "a very real chance that the Republican Party of Iowa will announce this week that Rick Santorum, and not Romney, won the Iowa caucuses," citing various campaign sources who reported that the final numbers will be different from those released on caucus night. Republican Party of Iowa executive director Chad Olsen said on January 17 that there have been errors giving both Santorum and Romney more votes than reported on caucus night.

On January 19, the Iowa Republican Party released the certified results showing Santorum edged out Romney with 29,839 votes to Romney's 29,805, a margin of 34 votes. The Iowa Republican Party initially declined to formally declare a winner because results from eight precincts were lost and could not be certified, which The Washington Post said "served to embarrass the Iowa GOP — which had to admit that it had misallocated some votes, and simply lost some others, in a razor's-edge election where every vote mattered." One party executive called the result a "split decision". The initial returns from the uncertified eight precincts (four in Lee County and one each in Cerro Gordo, Emmet, Franklin, and Pocahontas counties) also favored Santorum, and statistician Nate Silver stated that if those missing precincts had been included, Santorum's margin would have been increased.

Despite its earlier decision not to declare an official winner, on January 21, the Iowa Republican Party reversed itself and issued a press release formally declaring Santorum the winner of the caucuses, saying, "In order to clarify conflicting reports and to affirm the results released January 18 by the Republican Party of Iowa, Chairman Matthew Strawn and the state central committee declared Senator Rick Santorum the winner."

According to observers, the "muddled result and response" threatens the future of the Iowa caucuses' first-in-the-nation status, which already have many critics because of the attention paid to the caucuses and its unrepresentative demographic characteristics. The Des Moines Register stated that the 2012 caucus errors "opens a new line of attack: that Iowa’s process is amateurish, and that its results cannot be trusted."

== Polling ==
=== Entrance poll ===
An entrance poll was conducted by Edison Research for the Associated Press and the television networks, involving interviews with 1,787 caucus-goers at 40 randomly selected caucus locations throughout Iowa, with a +/- 4% margin of error. The entrance poll found:

Gender	Bachmann	Gingrich	Huntsman	Paul	Perry	Romney	Santorum	Other/No Preference
Men (57%)	4%	14%	1%	24%	10%	23%	23%	1%
Women (43%)	5%	12%	0%	19%	10%	25%	27%	2%
Age	Bachmann	Gingrich	Huntsman	Paul	Perry	Romney	Santorum	Other/ No Answer
17-29 (15%)	2%	5%	1%	48%	8%	13%	23%	NA
30-44 (16%)	4%	13%	0%	26%	6%	20%	30%	1%
45-64 (42%)	6%	14%	1%	16%	11%	25%	36%	1%
65+ (26%)	6%	17%	0%	11%	13%	33%	20%	NA
Education	Bachmann	Gingrich	Huntsman	Paul	Perry	Romney	Santorum	Other/ No Answer
College Graduate (52%)	4%	13%	1%	21%	7%	27%	26%	1%
No College Degree (48%)	6%	14%	0%	22%	13%	22%	23%	NA
Annual Income	Bachmann	Gingrich	Huntsman	Paul	Perry	Romney	Santorum	Other/ No Answer
Under $30,000 (13%)	6%	13%	0%	37%	14%	15%	13%	2%
$30,000–$50,000 (19%)	7%	12%	1%	26%	14%	16%	24%	NA
$50,000–$100,000 (39%)	5%	13%	1%	21%	9%	21%	29%	1%
At least $100,000 (28%)	3%	15%	0%	14%	7%	36%	24%	1%
Political Party Identification	Bachmann	Gingrich	Huntsman	Paul	Perry	Romney	Santorum	Other/ No Answer
Democratic (2%)	NA	NA	NA	NA	NA	NA	NA	NA
Republican (75%)	5%	14%	0%	14%	11%	27%	29%	NA
Independent (23%)	5%	11%	2%	43%	7%	19%	13%	NA
Ideology	Bachmann	Gingrich	Huntsman	Paul	Perry	Romney	Santorum	Other/ No Answer
Very Conservative (47%)	7%	14%	0%	15%	14%	14%	35%	1%
Somewhat Conservative (37%)	3%	16%	1%	21%	9%	32%	19%	NA%
Moderate or Liberal (17%)	3%	6%	3%	40%	5%	35%	8%	NA
Evangelical or born-again Christian?	Bachmann	Gingrich	Huntsman	Paul	Perry	Romney	Santorum	Other/ No Answer
Yes (57%)	6%	14%	1%	18%	14%	14%	32%	1%
No (43%)	3%	12%	1%	26%	5%	28%	14%	1%
Time of Decision	Bachmann	Gingrich	Huntsman	Paul	Perry	Romney	Santorum	
In the Last Few Days (46%)	5%	13%	1%	11%	13%	23%	34%	
Sometime in 2011 (53%)	5%	13%	1%	31%	8%	26%	16%	
Did the Campaign Ads Affect Your Vote?	Bachmann	Gingrich	Huntsman	Paul	Perry	Romney	Santorum	Other/ No Answer
Most Important Factor (3%)	NA	NA	NA	NA	NA	NA	NA	NA
Important Factor (22%)	6%	10%	1%	19%	19%	22%	22%	1%
Minor Factor (37%)	5%	12%	1%	18%	10%	27%	27%	NA
Not a Factor at All (32%)		16%	1%	27%	4%	24%	23%	1%
Most Important Issue	Bachmann	Gingrich	Huntsman	Paul	Perry	Romney	Santorum	Other/ No Answer
Abortion (13%)	7%	9%	NA	7%	11%	7%	58%	1%
Budget Deficit (34%)	5%	15%	1%	28%	11%	21%	19%	NA
Economy (42%)	3%	13%	1%	20%	9%	33%	2%	
Health Care (4%)	NA	NA	NA	NA	NA	NA	NA	
Most Important Candidate Quality	Bachmann	Gingrich	Huntsman	Paul	Perry	Romney	Santorum	Other/ No Answer
Can Defeat Obama (31%)	3%	20%	0%	9%	7%	48%	13%	NA
True Conservative (25%)	9%	4%	NA	37%	12%	1%	36%	1%
Strong Moral Character (24%)	5%	5%	0%	23%	14%	11%	40%	2%
Right Experience (16%)	2%	28%	3%	16%	10%	35%	6%	NA
Residential Character	Bachmann	Gingrich	Huntsman	Paul	Perry	Romney	Santorum	Other/ No Answer
Urban (23%)	4%	10%	0%	26%	9%	26%	24%	1%
Suburban (27%)	6%	12%	1%	18%	8%	24%	22%	NA
Rural (50%)	5%	15%	1%	21%	12%	19%	26%	1%
Region of Iowa	Bachmann	Gingrich	Huntsman	Paul	Perry	Romney	Santorum	Other/ No Answer
East (21%)	4%	11%	NA	25%	6%	31%	22%	1%
East Central (21%)	6%	15%	1%	23%	11%	20%	25%	NA
Central (38%)	5%	13%	1%	21%	12%	25%	22%	1%
West (21%)	5%	15%	1%	17%	11%	21%	30%	NA

== Results ==
There are 614,913 registered Republicans as of January 3, 2012.
Turnout was 19.9% of the voting-eligible population (registered Iowa Republicans).

Iowa Republican caucuses, January 3, 2012
Candidate	Votes	Percentage	Projected delegate count		Actual delegates
Candidate	Votes	Percentage	CNN	FOX	Actual delegates
Rick Santorum	29,839	24.56%	7	12	0
Mitt Romney	29,805	24.53%	7	12	6
Ron Paul	26,036	21.43%	7	0	22
Newt Gingrich	16,163	13.30%	2	0	0
Rick Perry	12,557	10.33%	0	0	0
Michele Bachmann	6,046	4.98%	0	0	0
Jon Huntsman	739	0.61%	0	0	0
Herman Cain (write-in)	45	0.04%	0	0	0
Sarah Palin (write-in)	23	0.02%	0	0	0
Buddy Roemer (write-in)	17	0.01%	0	0	0
Fred Karger (write-in)	10	0.01%	0	0	0
Gary Johnson (write-in)	8	0.01%	0	0	0
Donald Trump (write-in)	5	0.00%	0	0	0
Paul Ryan (write-in)	3	0.00%	0	0	0
Rudy Giuliani (write-in)	2	0.00%	0	0	0
Mike Huckabee (write-in)	2	0.00%	0	0	0
Ben Lange (write-in)	2	0.00%	0	0	0
Roy Moore (write-in)	2	0.00%	0	0	0
Tim Pawlenty (write-in)	2	0.00%	0	0	0
Condoleezza Rice (write-in)	2	0.00%	0	0	0
Jared Blankenship (write-in)	1	0.00%	0	0	0
Pat Buchanan (write-in)	1	0.00%	0	0	0
John McCain (write-in)	1	0.00%	0	0	0
Ralph Nader (write-in)	1	0.00%	0	0	0
Robert Ray (write-in)	1	0.00%	0	0	0
Scott Walker (write-in)	1	0.00%	0	0	0
No Preference	147	0.12%	0	0	0
Other	40	0.03%	0	0	0
Unprojected delegates:			5	4	—
Total:	121,501	100.00%	28	28	28

=== Selection of delegates ===
The Iowa Republican precinct caucus is the first part in a multi-step process to elect the state's 25 pledged delegates to the 2012 Republican National Convention. The January 3 caucuses (precinct caucuses) elect delegates to county conventions. These county conventions, in turn, elect delegates to the four congressional-district conventions on March 10, who elect three national delegates each. Each congressional-district convention also appoints two members to a "slate committee" which chooses 13 additional delegates. These 13 delegates are voted on at the Republican Party of Iowa state convention on June 18. Notably, even the 25 pledged delegates are not bound to support any candidate at the national convention. Unlike the majority of states, Iowa RNC delegates are free to vote for any candidate for president or vice president. In addition to the 25 pledged delegates, Iowa also sent three unpledged delegates to the convention, for a total of 28 Iowa delegates.

According to the Associated Press (AP), the Iowa Republican system "puts a premium on getting the most votes in individual congressional districts. If a candidate's supporters can control a congressional district convention, they can choose national delegates and slate committee members who support their candidate." A January 4 Associated Press analysis projected that Romney would win 13 delegates, Santorum would win 12, and the rest of the candidates would get none. This projection was also used by The New York Times. CNN used a different estimate, predicting that Romney would receive 18 delegates, Santorum would receive 8, Paul would receive 7, Perry would receive 4, and Gingrich would receive 2. NBC used a third estimate, predicting that Romney would receive 11, Santorum would receive 11, and Paul would receive 3.

Contrary to these early projections, however, Paul ultimately did extremely well in the delegate race. Indeed, despite the fact that Paul finished in third place in the popular vote, 22 of Iowa's 28 delegates ultimately voted for Paul at the Republican National Convention. Since Iowa's delegates are not bound to vote for a nominee based on the results of the caucuses, Paul supporters were able to exert a substantial influence on the delegate race by mastering Iowa's arcane election rules and winning key positions on state election committees. The Los Angeles Times described this effort by the Paul campaign as "part of a quiet strategy by Paul and his backers to amass an army of supporters at the GOP gathering in August in Tampa, Fla., to push Paul's views on liberty, states' rights, the monetary system and foreign policy". Some commentators noted that the Romney campaign was partly to blame for the delegate outcome, for their failure to mobilize supporters to participate fully in the Iowa nomination process.

Convention results
Candidate	1st	2nd	3rd	4th	State	Party leaders	Projected total	RNC floor vote
Ron Paul	3	2	3	3	10	0	21	22
Mitt Romney	0	0	0	0	1	0	1	6
Uncommitted/Unknown	0	1	0	0	2	3	6	0
Total	12				13	3	28	28

== Aftermath ==
The day after her unsatisfactory sixth-place performance in Iowa, Bachmann announced she was dropping out of the presidential race. Following his low fifth-place finish, Perry initially announced he was "reassessing" his campaign "to determine whether there is a path forward," but subsequently stated that he would continue on to New Hampshire and South Carolina.

== See also ==
- 2012 Iowa Democratic caucuses
- 2012 Republican Party presidential primaries
- 2012 United States presidential election in Iowa
