= Leland J. Kennedy =

American politician (1908–1990)

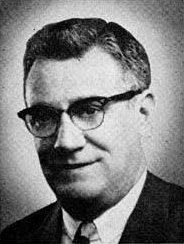
- Portrait from the 1965–1966 Illinois Blue Book

Member of the Illinois House of Representatives
- In office January 9, 1963 – January 8, 1975
- Preceded by: Paul Simon
- Succeeded by: Joe E. Lucco; Everett G. Steele; Sam W. Wolf
- Constituency: 56th district (1973–1975); 55th district (1967–1973); At-large (1965–1967); 53rd district (1963–1965)
- In office January 8, 1947 – January 12, 1955
- Preceded by: Milton Mueller; James O. Monroe
- Succeeded by: Paul Simon
- Constituency: 47th district

Member of the Alton City Council from the 7th ward
- In office 1941 – January 22, 1947

Personal details
- Born: Leland Joseph Kennedy; December 3, 1908 Alton, Illinois, U.S.
- Died: February 17, 1990 (aged 81)
- Party: Democratic

Military service
- Allegiance: United States
- Branch/service: United States Army
- Years of service: 1943–1945
- Battles/wars: World War II

Leland Joseph Kennedy (December 3, 1908 – February 17, 1990) was an American politician. He served as a member of the Illinois House of Representatives from 1947 to 1955, and from 1963 to 1975. A member of the Democratic Party, he also served on the Alton City Council from 1941 to 1947.

== Early life ==
Kennedy was born on December 3, 1908, in Alton, Illinois, to Joseph C. Kennedy and Louise Herweck Kennedy. He graduated from high school and took a night school class on political science.

Kennedy was an operating engineer at Shell plc. After being elected to the state legislature, he took a five-month leave of absence, returning in July 1947.

== Alton City Council (1941–1947) ==
Kennedy announced his candidacy for the seventh ward of the Alton City Council. He defeated his opponents, Gilbert V. McCutchan and Robert J. Richardson, in the election, receiving 884 votes; McCutchan received 751 votes and Richardson had 286 votes.

While serving as an alderman in 1943, Kennedy was drafted for the United States Army; he began his military service on October 28. A year into his service, he was severely injured in a vehicular accident in France. He spent ten days in French hospitals before being moved to an American hospital located in England. He was later sent to the Baxter General Hospital in Spokane, Washington. Kennedy was re-elected to the council in 1945 unopposed. His opponent, Marshall N. Selkirk, withdrew from the race after Kennedy's announcement for re-election, stating that he does "not wish to run against a serviceman." Kennedy returned home to Alton on a 60-day furlough in April 1945.

Between 1945 and 1947, Kennedy was chairman of the Finance Committee and member of the Public Building Committee.

== Illinois House of Representatives ==
=== Elections ===
Kennedy first ran for the Illinois House of Representatives in 1944 for the 47th district, although lost the Democratic nomination to Lloyd Harris. In November 1945, Kennedy announced a second bid for the district in the 1946 election. He won the election, defeating Republican opponent Schuyler B. Vaughan. In response, Vaughan contested his defeat, alleging that the Madison County canvassing board allowed election judges to make changes in returns "for the pretended purpose of correcting alleged errors in the counting of votes." Upon his election, Kennedy resigned from the Alton City Council effective January 23, 1947.

In the 1948 election, Kennedy won the Democratic primary with Harris, and won the general election alongside Harris and Orville Hodge. Kennedy was re-elected for a third term in 1950, and a fourth in 1952.

During the 1954 election, Kennedy lost the Democratic primary to Paul Simon in an upset. In 1962, After Simon's entry into the Illinois State Senate election, it was theorized that Kennedy would campaign for Simon's seat in the House of Representatives, now the 53rd district. In December 1961, Kennedy announced his campaign. He officially filed for candidacy a month later in January 1962.

In November 1973, Kennedy revealed to the Edwardsville Intelligencer that he was considering not running for re-election, stating that he "would like to see the length of time between the primary and the general election shortened." He chose not to, and endorsed Dan O'Neill for the Democratic primary.

=== Tenure (1947–1955) ===
Kennedy was assigned to the committees of military and veterans' affairs; railroads, public utilities and aviations; industry and labor relations; and municipalities. One of his first bills introduced to the legislature would have required municipal bonds to be sold to the highest bidder. The bill died in the chamber.

=== Subsequent activities (1955–1963) ===
In January 1955, Kennedy announced his campaign for supervisor of Alton Township, running against Leo F. Fitzgerald and incumbent Louis E. Walter. Kennedy placed last, receiving 1,530 votes.

=== Second tenure (1963–1975) ===
Kennedy introduced a bill in January 1963 that would only recognize adultery as reason for a divorce, after researching similar laws in New York.

== Personal life ==
During the 66th session of the Illinois General Assembly, Kennedy married Mary Eileen Cain. They had two children together: Patrick and Maureen.

Kennedy died on February 17, 1990.
