= Abraham Lincoln Commission on Study Abroad =

The United States Congress established the Abraham Lincoln Study Abroad Commission in 2005 to develop the framework for an international study abroad program for college students with the goal of sending one million American college students to study abroad every year by 2017. The bill was sponsored by Sen. Richard J. Durbin of Illinois (D), and inspired by the lobbying of Senator Paul Simon, who believed, in the aftermath of the September 11 attacks that one of the most constructive ways help create peace would be to encourage international education by subsidizing oversea study for college students. While the bill died in committee, it is frequently invoked in discussions of "the international education deficit"—the imbalance between the number of international students studying in the United States and the number of American students studying abroad.
