= David M. Beckmann =

American Pastor and Economist

David M. Beckmann (born 1948) is an American pastor and economist. He was the president of Bread for the World from 1991 to 2020.

== Early life and education ==
Beckmann was born in Kearney, Nebraska. He received a BA from Yale University. After graduating, he studied religion in rural Ghana. In 1974, he earned a Master of Divinity from Christ Seminary and in 1975, a Master of Science degree in Economics from the London School of Economics.

== Career ==
Beckmann was an economist at the World Bank. In September 1991, Beckmann succeeded Arthur Simon as president of Bread for the World. He retired from the position in 2020.

Beckmann is currently the Coordinator of the Circle of Protection.

== Awards and honors ==
Beckmann was awarded the 2010 World Food Prize for his work as president of Bread for the World.

== Books ==
- Eden Revival: Spiritual Churches in Ghana (1974)
- The Overseas List (1979, Revised and Expanded Edition 1985)
- with R. Agarwala, S. Burmester, and I. Serageldin Friday Morning Reflections at the World Bank: Essays on Values and Development (1991)
- Grace at the Table: Ending Hunger in God's World (1999)
- Exodus from Hunger: We Are Called to Change the Politics of Hunger (2010)
- Poverty Abolitionists, Faith, Activism, and Hope for Difficult Times (2026)
