= Paul Simon (politician) =

American politician (1928–2003)

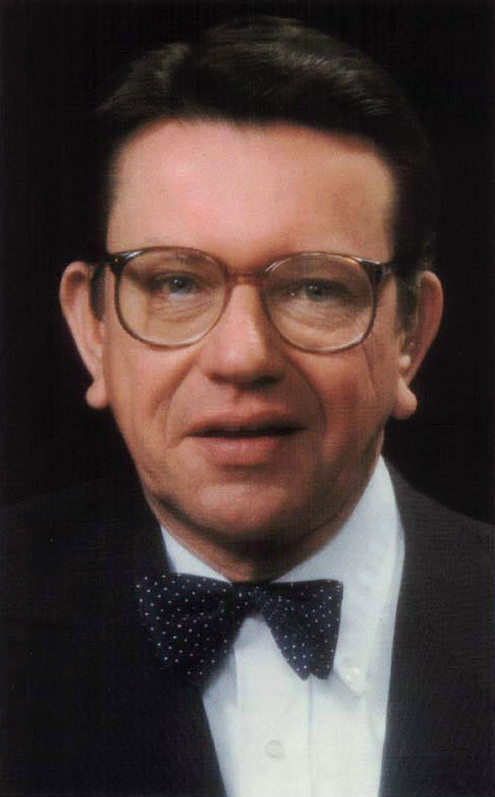
- Official portrait, c. 1980s

United States Senator from Illinois
- In office January 3, 1985 – January 3, 1997
- Preceded by: Charles Percy
- Succeeded by: Dick Durbin

Member of the U.S. House of Representatives from Illinois
- In office January 3, 1975 – January 3, 1985
- Preceded by: Kenneth J. Gray
- Succeeded by: Kenneth J. Gray
- Constituency: 24th district (1975–1983); 22nd district (1983–1985)

39th Lieutenant Governor of Illinois
- In office January 13, 1969 – January 8, 1973
- Governor: Richard B. Ogilvie
- Preceded by: Samuel Shapiro (1968)
- Succeeded by: Neil Hartigan

Member of the Illinois Senate from the 47th district
- In office 1963–1969

Member of the Illinois House of Representatives from the 47th district
- In office 1955–1963

Personal details
- Born: Paul Martin Simon; November 29, 1928 Eugene, Oregon, U.S.
- Died: December 9, 2003 (aged 75) Springfield, Illinois, U.S.
- Resting place: Rowan Cemetery; Makanda, Illinois, U.S.
- Party: Democratic
- Spouses: Jeanne Hurley (m. 1960; died 2000) Patricia Derge (m. 2001)
- Children: 2, including Sheila
- Education: University of Oregon; Dana College

Military service
- Allegiance: United States
- Branch/service: United States Army
- Years of service: 1951–1953
- Rank: Private First Class
- Unit: Counterintelligence Corps

Paul Martin Simon (November 29, 1928 – December 9, 2003) was an American author and politician from Illinois. He served in the United States House of Representatives from 1975 to 1985 and in the United States Senate from 1985 to 1997. A member of the Democratic Party, he unsuccessfully ran for the 1988 Democratic presidential nomination.

After his political career, Simon founded the Public Policy Institute at Southern Illinois University Carbondale in Carbondale, Illinois, which was later named for him. There, he taught classes on politics, history and journalism. Simon was famous for his distinctive bow tie and horn-rimmed glasses.

== Early life and career ==
Simon was born in Eugene, Oregon on November 29, 1928. He was the son of Martin Paul Simon, a Lutheran minister and missionary to China, and Ruth Lilly (née Tolzmann) Simon, a Lutheran missionary as well. His family was of German descent.

Simon attended Concordia University, a Lutheran school in Portland. He later attended the University of Oregon and Dana College in Blair, Nebraska, but never graduated. After meeting with local Lions Club members, he borrowed $3,600 to take over the defunct Troy Call newspaper in 1948, becoming the nation's youngest editor-publisher, of the renamed Troy Tribune in Troy, Illinois, and eventually built a chain of 14 weekly newspapers. His activism against gambling, prostitution, and government corruption while at the Troy Tribune influenced the newly elected governor, Adlai Stevenson II, to take a stand on these issues, creating national exposure for Simon that later resulted in his testifying before the Kefauver Commission.

In May 1951, Simon left his newspaper and enlisted in the United States Army. Simon served in West Germany during the Korean War. Assigned to the Counterintelligence Corps, he attained the rank of private first class and was discharged in June 1953.

== State political career ==
Upon his discharge, Simon was elected to and began his political career in the Illinois House of Representatives. As a state representative, Simon was an advocate for civil rights, and once hosted an event attended by former First Lady Eleanor Roosevelt. After a primary debate with two other candidates, a newspaper account of a debate stated "the man with the bowtie did well," and he adopted his trademark bowtie and horn-rimmed glasses. In 1963, Simon was elected to the Illinois State Senate, serving until 1969. In the State Senate, Simon was part of a group of anti-machine liberal reformers called the "Kosher Nostra" that also included Anthony Scariano, Abner Mikva, and Robert E. Mann.

In 1968, Simon was elected Lieutenant Governor of Illinois. As a Democrat, he served with Republican governor Richard B. Ogilvie. Their bipartisan teamwork produced the state's first income tax and paved the way for the state's 1969 constitutional convention, which created the fourth and current Illinois Constitution. The Ogilvie-Simon administration was the only one in Illinois history in which the elected governor and lieutenant governor were from different political parties: The Illinois constitution now pairs the offices as running mates on a ticket. In 1972, Simon ran for the Democratic nomination for governor. Despite his longtime reputation as a political reformer, he was supported by the Cook County Democratic machine, led by Chicago Mayor Richard J. Daley. Nevertheless, Simon lost to Dan Walker, who went on to win the general election.

== Out of office ==
In the years between his gubernatorial defeat and political comeback, Simon taught at Sangamon State University, where he started the Public Affairs Reporting master's degree program, and the Kennedy School of Government at Harvard University.

== Rise to national prominence ==
=== U.S. House of Representatives ===
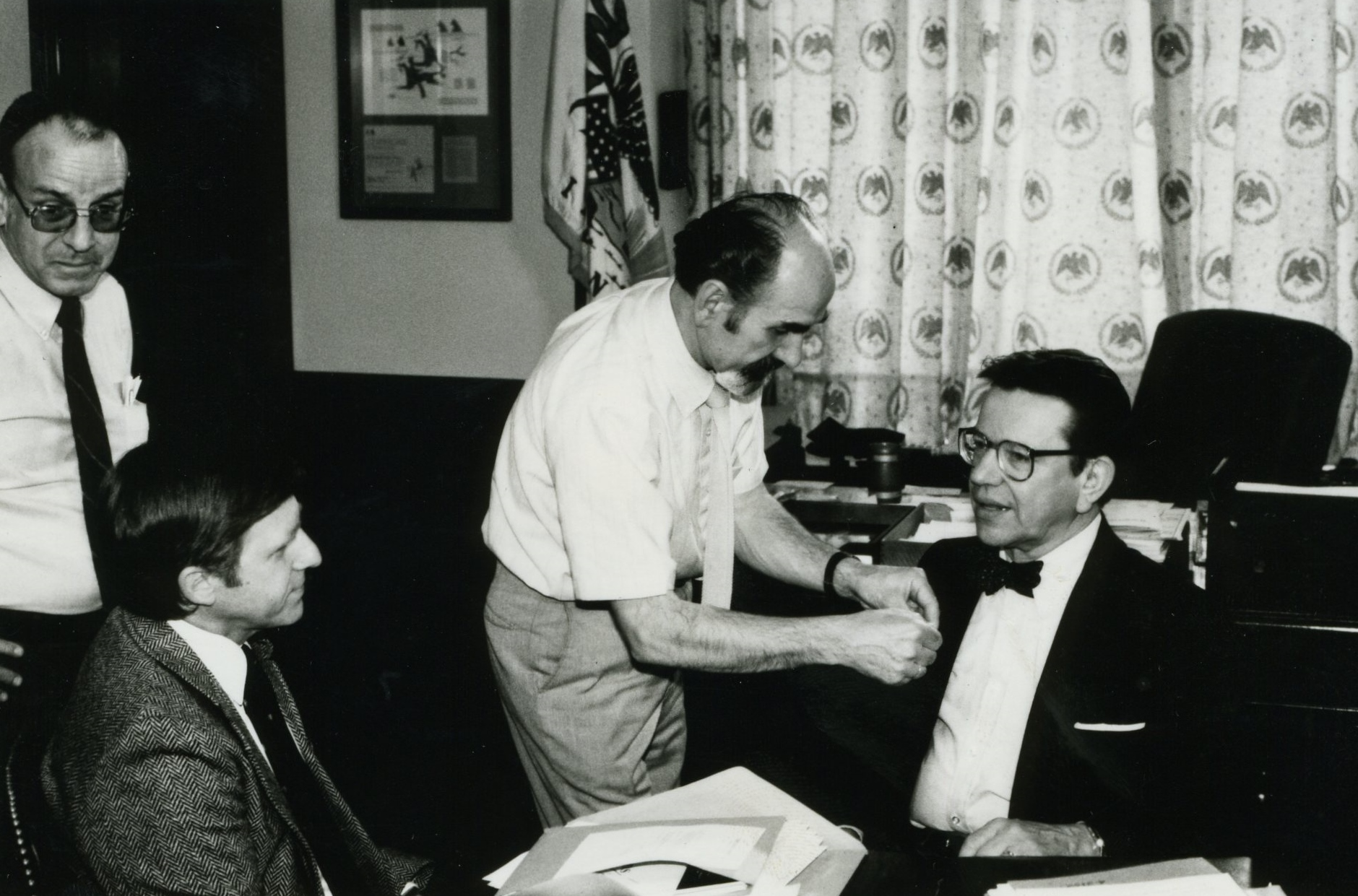
Representative Simon interviewed by college friend Richard Jensen.

Simon resumed his political career in 1974 when he was elected to Congress from Illinois's 24th congressional district, defeating former Harrisburg mayor Val Oshel. He was re-elected four times. He was later redistricted to Illinois's 22nd congressional district. In 1978, Simon was the first recipient of the Foreign Language Advocacy Award, presented by the Northeast Conference on the Teaching of Foreign Languages in recognition of his service on the President's Commission on Foreign Language and International Studies and his support for language study. According to the New York Times, Simon was never particularly popular with his House colleagues.

=== U.S. Senate ===
In 1984, Simon was elected to the United States Senate, defeating three-term incumbent Charles H. Percy in an upset election and winning 50% of the vote. He won reelection to the U.S. Senate in 1990, defeating U.S. representative Lynn Morley Martin by a margin of 65–35%. While serving in the U.S. Senate, he co-authored an unsuccessful balanced budget amendment with Republican senator Orrin Hatch of Utah.

External videos
- Retirement announcement by Simon, November 15, 1994, C-SPAN

Simon gained national prominence after criticizing President George H. W. Bush during the 1992 presidential election, after Bush claimed a central role in causing the collapse of the Eastern bloc of the Soviet Union. During a speech at Chicago's Taste of Polonia, Bush had aggressively promoted the success of his own presidency and his importance as vice president in the Reagan administration's role in Eastern Europe. This was an attempt by Bush to carry Chicago's Polish community in order to win Illinois during the election. Bush's claims were roundly denounced by Simon, and Bush eventually lost the state in the general election, possibly due to Simon's remarks. Simon did not seek reelection in 1996.

=== Presidential campaign ===
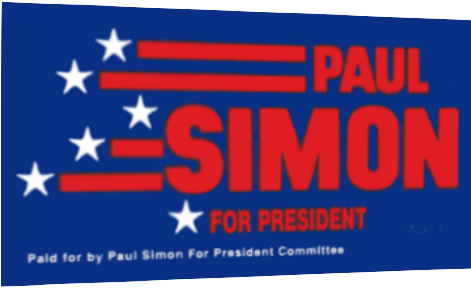
1988 campaign logo

External videos
- Booknotes interview with Jeanne Simon on Codename: Scarlett – Life on the Campaign Trail by the Wife of a Presidential Candidate, July 23, 1989, C-SPAN

Simon sought the Democratic nomination for president in 1988. Mostly unknown outside of Illinois and in low single digits in national polls after his March 1987 announcement, Simon made a name for himself as the oldest, some thought most old-fashioned, candidate, with horn rimmed glasses and bow tie, and one who proudly associated himself with the New Deal liberalism associated with Presidents Franklin D. Roosevelt and Harry S. Truman. Simon surged ahead in Iowa in October, and was, by December, the clear front-runner in that state.

In February 1988, Simon narrowly lost the Iowa caucus to Representative Dick Gephardt of Missouri, and finished third in the New Hampshire primary the following week, with weak showings in Minnesota and South Dakota a week later. Out of money and momentum, Simon largely skipped the key Southern "Super Tuesday" primaries on March 8, concentrating on his home state a week later, where key local Democrats were running as Simon delegates on the delegate selection ballot, and wanted to attend the Democratic National Convention regardless of Simon's slim chance of winning the nomination. Simon won the Illinois primary, and decided to make a final effort in the Wisconsin primary in early April, but dropped out after he finished behind Governor of Massachusetts Michael Dukakis, Reverend Jesse Jackson, and Tennessee Senator Albert Gore. Simon endorsed Dukakis, who won the Democratic nomination in July, with Jackson the last active challenger. To boost his campaign, Simon made an appearance on Saturday Night Live (SNL), co-hosting with musician Paul Simon (to whom he was not related).

== Political positions ==
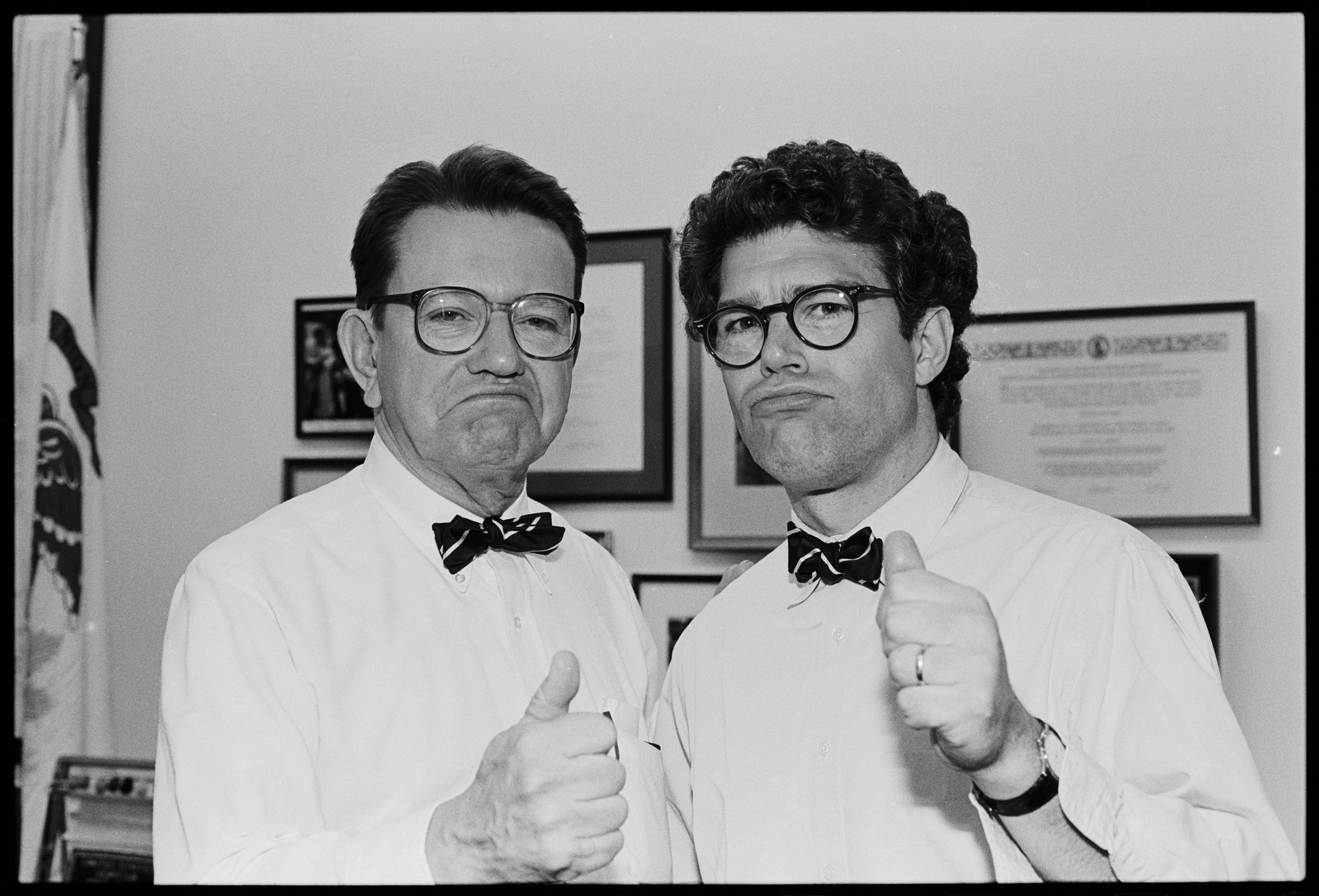
Simon in 1992 with comedian Al Franken at the Mayflower Hotel. Franken impersonated Simon in Saturday Night Live sketches during the 1988 presidential campaign, and won a Senate seat himself in 2008.

=== Social issues ===
Simon was fiercely against obscenity and violence in the media during the 1990s, and his efforts against media violence helped lead to the adoption of the V-chip. During the 1990s, Simon opposed both the Republicans' Contract with America, and President Bill Clinton's welfare reforms. He was one of 21 Senators to vote against the Personal Responsibility and Work Opportunity Act. In 1996, Simon joined thirteen other Democratic senators (including his fellow U.S. senator from Illinois, Carol Moseley Braun) in voting against the Defense of Marriage Act, which prohibited federal recognition of same-sex marriage.

=== Fiscal issues ===
Simon was considered a fiscal conservative who described himself as "a pay-as-you-go Democrat". As a senator, Simon helped overhaul the college student loan program to allow students and their families to borrow directly from the federal government, thus saving money by not using private banks to disburse the loans.

=== Foreign affairs ===
Simon promoted a military response to Somalia during the George H. W. Bush administration. Simon was an outspoken critic of President Bill Clinton's response to the 1994 Rwandan genocide. Simon believed that America should have acted faster, and Clinton later said his belated response was the biggest mistake of his presidency. Along with former Vermont Senator Jim Jeffords, Simon was retroactively praised by Canadian Lieutenant-General Roméo Dallaire, the former Force Commander of the United Nations Assistance Mission for Rwanda, for actively lobbying the Clinton administration into mounting a humanitarian mission to Rwanda during the genocide. According to Dallaire's book Shake Hands with the Devil, he "owe[s] a great debt of gratitude" to both senators.

=== Presidency ===
Simon believed modern presidents practice "followership," rather than leadership, saying, "We have been more and more leaning on opinion polls to decide what we're going to do, and you don't get leadership from polls... and not just at the Presidential level. It's happening with Senators, House members, and even state legislators sometimes, [when they] conduct polls to find out where people stand on something." Simon was a supporter of Taiwan, and opposed United States policy to isolate the island. He helped convince President Clinton to allow Taiwanese president Lee Teng-hui to visit the United States. He was also a longtime admirer of Madame Chiang Kai-shek, having witnessed her historic speech to a joint session of Congress as a teen and met her in person in 1995 at a Capitol Hill reception commemorating the 50th anniversary of the cessation of World War II.

== Personal life ==
=== Education ===
Simon rose to national attention in the 1960s, due in part to his well-researched book Lincoln's Preparation for Greatness: The Illinois Legislative Years. Despite being published 100 years after Abraham Lincoln's death, it was the first book to exhaustively cite original source documents from Lincoln's eight years in the General Assembly. He later went on to write more than 20 books on a wide range of topics, including interfaith marriages (he was a Lutheran and his wife, Jeanne, was a Catholic), global water shortages, United States Supreme Court nomination battles that focused heavily on his personal experiences with Robert Bork and Clarence Thomas, his autobiography, and even a well-received book on martyred abolitionist publisher Elijah Lovejoy. His final book, Our Culture of Pandering, was published in October 2003, two months before his death.

After his primary defeat for governor in 1972, Simon founded the Public Affairs Reporting graduate program at Sangamon State University in Springfield, Illinois, which helped launch the careers of more than 500 journalists. Simon, who had written four books at the time; he taught a course titled "Non-Fiction Magazine and Book Writing" at Sangamon State, and also taught at the John F. Kennedy School of Government in 1973.

Simon lived for many years in the small town of Makanda, Illinois, south of Carbondale, where he was a professor and director of the SIU Public Policy Institute. While there, he tried to foster the institute into becoming a think tank that could advance the lives of all people. Activities included going to Liberia and Croatia to monitor their elections, bringing major speakers to campus, denouncing the death penalty, trying to end the United States embargo against Cuba, fostering political courage among his students, promoting an amendment to the United States Constitution to end the electoral college, and attempting to limit the president to a single six-year term of office. During the electoral college fiasco that followed the 2000 election, Simon said: "I think if somebody gets the majority vote, they should be president. But, I don't think the system is going to be changed."

=== Family ===
Simon was the brother of Arthur Simon, founder of Bread for the World. On April 21, 1960, Simon married Jeanne Hurley Simon, a member of the Illinois state legislature. It was the first time in Illinois history that two sitting members of the Illinois General Assembly married. She was an integral part of her husband's rise to national prominence. She later became a successful lawyer, author, and chair of National Commission on Libraries and Information Science. She died in February 2000 of brain cancer. Upon her death, Illinois Senator Dick Durbin delivered a tribute to Mrs. Simon on the Senate floor. Their daughter, Sheila Simon, became the 46th lieutenant governor of Illinois in January, 2011. She previously served as a councilwoman in Carbondale, Illinois and was a law professor at Southern Illinois University. In May 2001, Simon remarried to Patricia Derge, the widow of former Southern Illinois University President David Derge.

=== Culture ===
Simon appeared on Saturday Night Live with host and singer Paul Simon (no relation) on December 19, 1987. Also on SNL, Simon was played by Al Franken who would later become a senator himself. Simon made a brief cameo appearance as himself in the 1993 political comedy film Dave.

== Awards ==
In 1996 Simon was awarded American Library Association Honorary Membership. Simon was inducted as a Laureate of The Lincoln Academy of Illinois and awarded the Order of Lincoln (the state's highest honor) by the governor of Illinois in 1998 in the area of Government. In 1999, Simon received The Lincoln Forum's Richard Nelson Current Award of Achievement.

== Death and legacy ==
External videos
- Funeral service for former Senator Paul Simon, December 14, 2003, C-SPAN

Simon died in Springfield, Illinois, on December 9, 2003, at the age of 75 following heart surgery. WBBM-TV reported his death as a "massive gastric blow-out". Just four days before, despite being hospitalized and awaiting surgery, he had endorsed Howard Dean's 2004 presidential bid via a telephone conference call he conducted from his hospital bed. He was also an early supporter of Barack Obama's 2004 Senate bid. After Simon's death, his daughter, Sheila, made a television commercial in which she declared "Barack Obama will be a U.S. Senator in the Paul Simon tradition." The ad was considered a major reason for Obama's surprise victory in the Democratic primary. In the Senate, Obama praised Simon as a "dear friend".

In July 2005, the Paul Simon Historical Museum was opened in Troy, Illinois, where Simon lived for 25 years. It included memorabilia from throughout his life, including the desk and camera from his days as a young editor of the Troy Tribune, items from his presidential campaign, and his lieutenant governor license plates. The museum closed in June 2012 due to lack of funding. Paul Simon Chicago Job Corps is a government funding school in which was named after him. PSCJC is located in the city of Chicago in Little Village on South Kedzie Ave and is available to people between the ages of 16–24 who are looking to better themselves and create a positive future for themselves.

== Electoral history ==
=== Illinois House of Representatives ===
Illinois's 47th Legislative District Representative Democratic Primary, 1954
Party	Candidate	Votes	%
Democratic	Paul Simon	30,141	43.42
Democratic	Lloyd "Curly" Harris (incumbent)	20,684	29.80
Democratic	Leland J. Kennedy (incumbent)	18,584.5	26.78
Total votes		69,409.5	100.0

Illinois's 47th Legislative District Representative General Election, 1954
Party	Candidate	Votes	%
Democratic	Paul Simon	68,808	34.18
Democratic	Lloyd "Curly" Harris (incumbent)	54,896.5	27.27
Republican	Ralph T. Smith	38,847	19.30
Republican	Edward D. Groshong (incumbent)	38,762.5	19.25
Total votes		201,314	100.0

Illinois's 53rd Representative District Democratic Primary, 1956
Party	Candidate	Votes	%
Democratic	Paul Simon	35,954.5	55.78
Democratic	Lloyd "Curly" Harris	23,022.5	35.71
Democratic	Roy L. Wilimzig, Jr.	5,486	8.51
Total votes		64,463	100.0

Illinois's 53rd Representative District General Election, 1956
Party	Candidate	Votes	%
Democratic	Paul Simon	88,250.5	34.81
Democratic	Lloyd "Curly" Harris	69,820.5	27.54
Republican	Ralph T. Smith	51,248	20.21
Republican	Thomas Holland	44,191.5	17.43
Total votes		253,510.5	100.0

Illinois's 53rd Representative District Democratic Primary, 1958
Party	Candidate	Votes	%
Democratic	Paul Simon (incumbent)	41,578	45.58
Democratic	Lloyd Curly Harris (incumbent)	23,481	25.74
Democratic	Andrew C. Gitchoff	18,512.5	20.29
Democratic	William E. Parker	5,580	6.12
Democratic	Roy L. Wilimzig, Jr.	2,072.5	2.27
Total votes		91,224	100.0

Illinois's 53rd Representative District General Election, 1958
Party	Candidate	Votes	%
Democratic	Paul Simon (incumbent)	62,836	37.00
Democratic	Lloyd Curly Harris (incumbent)	48,524	28.57
Republican	Ralph T. Smith (incumbent)	33,297	19.61
Republican	Everett (Doc) Haven	25,165.5	14.82
Total votes		169,822.5	100.0

Illinois's 53rd Representative District Democratic Primary, 1960
Party	Candidate	Votes	%
Democratic	Paul Simon (incumbent)	41,054	52.98
Democratic	Lloyd (Curly) Harris (incumbent)	27,999	36.13
Democratic	William E. Parker	8,433.5	10.88
Total votes		77,486.5	100.0

Illinois's 53rd Representative District General Election, 1960
Party	Candidate	Votes	%
Democratic	Paul Simon (incumbent)	101,428.5	35.32
Democratic	Lloyd (Curly) Harris (incumbent)	82,389.5	28.69
Republican	Ralph T. Smith (incumbent)	60,217.5	20.97
Republican	Robert E. Wharton	43,155	15.03
Total votes		287,190.5	100.0

=== Illinois Senate ===
Illinois's 47th Legislative District Democratic Primary, 1962
Party	Candidate	Votes	%
Democratic	Paul Simon	26,788	65.88
Democratic	Patrick S. O'Neill	13,876	34.12
Total votes		40,664	100.0

Illinois's 47th Legislative District General Election, 1962
Party	Candidate	Votes	%
Democratic	Paul Simon	50,928	69.69
Republican	Harold O. Gwillim	22,153	30.31
Total votes		73,081	100.0

Illinois's 53rd Legislative District Democratic Primary, 1966
Party	Candidate	Votes	%
Democratic	Paul Simon	19,365	99.99
Write-in		1	0.01
Total votes		19,366	100.0

Illinois's 53rd Legislative District General Election, 1966
Party	Candidate	Votes	%
Democratic	Paul Simon	38,319	73.61
Republican	John B. Moss	13,733	26.38
Total votes		52,052	100.0

=== Illinois Lieutenant Governor ===
1968 Illinois Lieutenant Governor Democratic Primary
Party	Candidate	Votes	%
Democratic	Paul Simon	208,910	100.0
Write-in		4	0.0
Total votes		208,914	100.0

1968 Illinois Lieutenant Governor General Election
Party	Candidate	Votes	%
Democratic	Paul Simon	2,222,331	50.87
Republican	Robert A. Dwyer	2,125,910	48.66
Socialist Labor	Stanley L. Prorok	20,122	0.46
Write-in		2	0.00
Total votes		4,368,365	100.0

=== Illinois Governor ===
1972 Illinois Gubernatorial Democratic Primary
Party	Candidate	Votes	%
Democratic	Daniel Walker	299,709	55.69
Democratic	Paul Simon	238,459	44.31
Write-in		22	0.00
Total votes		538,190	100.0

=== US House of Representatives ===
Illinois's 24th Congressional District Democratic Primary, 1974
Party	Candidate	Votes	%
Democratic	Paul Simon	47,727	68.42
Democratic	Joe R. Browning	22,024	31.58
Total votes		69,751	100.0

Illinois's 24th Congressional District General Election, 1974
Party	Candidate	Votes	%
Democratic	Paul Simon	108,417	59.55
Republican	Val Oshel	73,634	40.45
Total votes		182,051	100.0

Illinois's 24th Congressional District Democratic Primary, 1976
Party	Candidate	Votes	%
Democratic	Paul Simon (incumbent)	69,977	100.0
Write-in		1	0.0
Total votes		69,978	100.0

Illinois's 24th Congressional District General Election, 1976
Party	Candidate	Votes	%
Democratic	Paul Simon (incumbent)	152,344	67.38
Republican	Peter G. Prineas	73,766	32.62
Total votes		226,110	100.0

Illinois's 24th Congressional District Democratic Primary, 1978
Party	Candidate	Votes	%
Democratic	Paul Simon (incumbent)	46,370	99.99
Write-in		3	0.01
Total votes		46,373	100.0

Illinois's 24th Congressional District General Election, 1978
Party	Candidate	Votes	%
Democratic	Paul Simon (incumbent)	110,298	65.63
Republican	John T. Anderson	57,763	34.37
Total votes		168,061	100.0

Illinois's 24th Congressional District Democratic Primary, 1980
Party	Candidate	Votes	%
Democratic	Paul Simon (incumbent)	38,005	72.82
Democratic	Edwin Arentsen	14,183	27.18
Write-in		1	0.00
Total votes		52,189	100.0

Illinois's 24th Congressional District General Election, 1980
Party	Candidate	Votes	%
Democratic	Paul Simon (incumbent)	112,134	49.12
Republican	John T. Anderson	110,176	48.26
Constitution Party of Illinois	James H. Barrett	5,985	2.62
Total votes		228,295	100.0

Illinois's 22nd Congressional District Democratic Primary, 1982
Party	Candidate	Votes	%
Democratic	Paul Simon	46,847	100.0
Write-in		1	0.0
Total votes		46,848	100.0

Illinois's 22nd Congressional District General Election, 1982
Party	Candidate	Votes	%
Democratic	Paul Simon	123,693	66.16
Republican	Peter G. Prineas	63,279	33.84
Total votes		186,972	100.0

=== US Senate ===
1984 United States Senate Democratic Primary in Illinois
Party	Candidate	Votes	%
Democratic	Paul Simon	556,757	35.56
Democratic	Roland W. Burris	360,182	23.01
Democratic	Alex Seith	327,125	20.90
Democratic	Philip J. Rock	303,397	19.38
Democratic	Gerald M. Rose	17,985	1.15
Write-in		49	0.00
Total votes		1,565,495	100.0

1984 United States Senate election in Illinois
Party	Candidate	Votes	%
Democratic	Paul Simon	2,397,165	50.07
Republican	Charles Percy (incumbent)	2,308,039	48.21
Libertarian	Steve I. Givot	59,777	1.25
Citizens	Marjorie H. Pries	12,366	0.26
Socialist Workers	Nelson Gonzalez	4,913	0.10
Communist	Ishmael Flory	4,802	0.10
Write-in		273	0.01
Total votes		4,787,335	100.0

1990 United States Senate election in Illinois
Party	Candidate	Votes	%
Democratic	Paul Simon (incumbent)	2,115,377	65.07
Republican	Lynn Martin	1,135,628	34.93
Total votes		3,251,005	100.0

=== 1988 US Presidential Election ===
1988 Democratic Party presidential primaries
Party	Candidate	Votes	%
Democratic	Michael Dukakis	9,898,750	42.47
Democratic	Jesse Jackson	6,788,991	29.13
Democratic	Al Gore	3,185,806	13.67
Democratic	Dick Gephardt	1,399,041	6.00
Democratic	Paul M. Simon	1,082,960	4.65
Democratic	Gary Hart	415,716	1.78
Democratic	Unpledged	250,307	1.07
Democratic	Bruce Babbitt	77,780	0.33
Democratic	Lyndon LaRouche	70,938	0.30
Democratic	David Duke	45,289	0.19
Democratic	James Traficant	30,879	0.13
Democratic	Douglas Applegate	25,068	0.11
Total votes		23,271,525	100.0

== Publications ==
Title	Year	ISBN	Publisher	Subject matter	Comments
Lovejoy: Martyr to Freedom	1964		Concordia Publishing	Elijah Lovejoy	Written for young readers; Simon later adapted this work for adult readers (see below, Freedom's Champion).
Lincoln's Preparation for Greatness: The Illinois Legislative Years	1965	ISBN 9780252001888	University of Oklahoma Press	Early life and career of Abraham Lincoln	
A Hungry World	1966		Concordia Publishing	World hunger	
Protestant-Catholic Marriages Can Succeed	1967		Association Press	Interdenominational marriage	Written with Jeanne Hurley Simon
You Want to Change the World? So Change It	1971	ISBN 9780840753144	Thomas Nelson	Activism	
The Politics of World Hunger	1973	ISBN 9780061277764	Harper's Magazine Press	Food politics	Written with Arthur Simon
The Tongue-Tied American: Confronting the Foreign Language Crisis	1980	ISBN 9780826400222	Continuum Publishing Company	Language education in the United States	
The Once and Future Democrats: Strategies for Change	1982	ISBN 9780826402028	Continuum Publishing Company		
The Glass House: Politics and Morality in the Nation's Capital	1984	ISBN 9780826402462	Continuum Publishing Company		
Beginnings: Senator Paul Simon Speaks to Young Americans	1986	ISBN 9780826403674	Continuum Publishing Company		
Let's Put America Back to Work	1987	ISBN 9780933893184	Bonus Books		
Winners and Losers: The 1988 Race for the Presidency – One Candidate's Perspective	1989	ISBN 9780826404282	Continuum Publishing Company	1988 United States presidential election	
Advice & Consent: Clarence Thomas, Robert Bork and the Intriguing History of the Supreme Court's Nomination Battles	1992	ISBN 9780915765980	National Press Books	Clarence Thomas, Robert Bork, Nomination and confirmation to the Supreme Court of the United States, United States Senate Committee on the Judiciary	
We Can Do Better: How to Save America's Future-An Open Letter to President Clinton	1994	ISBN 9781882605149	National Press Books		
Freedom's Champion: Elijah Lovejoy	1995	ISBN 9780809319404	Southern Illinois University Press	Elijah Lovejoy	Foreword by Clarence Page; Adaptation for adult readers of Simon's earlier book for young readers (see above, Martyr to Freedom).
The Dollar Crisis: A Blueprint to Help Rebuild the American Dream	1996	ISBN 9781565302174	The Summit Publishing Group		Written with Ross Perot; Presentation by Simon and Perot on The Dollar Crisis, June 15, 1996, C-SPAN
Tapped Out: The Coming World Crisis in Water and What We Can Do About It	1998	ISBN 9781566493499	Welcome Rain Publishers	Water scarcity	
P.S.: The Autobiography of Paul Simon	1999	ISBN 9781566251129	Taylor Trade Publishing		
How to Get into Politics – and Why	2000	ISBN 9780669467963	Steck-Vaughn		Written with Michael Dukakis
Healing America: Values and Vision for the 21st Century	2003	ISBN 9781570755057	Orbis Books		
Our Culture of Pandering	2003	ISBN 9780809325290	Southern Illinois University Press		''Our Culture of Pandering'' official page
Fifty-Two Simple Ways to Make a Difference	2004	ISBN 9780806646787	Augsburg Fortress Publishers		

Political offices
Preceded by Samuel H. Shapiro	Lieutenant Governor of Illinois; 1969–1973	Succeeded by Neil Hartigan
U.S. House of Representatives
Preceded by Kenneth J. Gray	Member of the U.S. House of Representatives from Illinois's 24th congressional district 1975–1983	Constituency abolished
Preceded by Dan Crane	Member of the U.S. House of Representatives from Illinois's 22nd congressional district 1983–1985	Succeeded by Kenneth J. Gray
Party political offices
Preceded by Samuel H. Shapiro	Democratic nominee for Lieutenant Governor of Illinois; 1968	Succeeded by Neil Hartigan
Preceded by Robert Byrd, Alan Cranston, Al Gore, Gary Hart, Bennett Johnston, Ted Kennedy, Tip O'Neill, Don Riegle, Paul Sarbanes, Jim Sasser	Response to the State of the Union address 1983; Served alongside: Les AuCoin, Joe Biden, Bill Bradley, Robert Byrd, Tom Daschle, Bill Hefner, Barbara Kennelly, George Miller, Tip O'Neill, Paul Tsongas, Tim Wirth	Succeeded by Max Baucus, Joe Biden, David Boren, Barbara Boxer, Robert Byrd, Dante Fascell, Bill Gray, Tom Harkin, Dee Huddleston, Carl Levin, Tip O'Neill, Claiborne Pell
Preceded by Alex Seith	Democratic nominee for U.S. senator from Illinois (Class 2); 1984, 1990	Succeeded by Dick Durbin
U.S. Senate
Preceded by Charles H. Percy	U.S. Senator (Class 2) from Illinois; 1985–1997; Served alongside: Alan J. Dixon, Carol Moseley Braun	Succeeded by Dick Durbin
