= Election verification exit poll =

Survey take for election verification

An election verification exit poll (EVEP) is a relatively new concept in polling, intended to improve the accuracy of exit polls to such an extent that they can be used to verify election results. Traditional (media) exit polling relies on small samples, whereas EVEPs propose to use larger samples.

== Motivation ==
A USAID document (written for US workers observing foreign elections) concludes that parallel vote tabulation "is the preferred tool for verifying election results where the context and local capacity permit. Exit polls can collect important data for understanding voter intent, providing insight into political and social dynamics [...] However, they provide limited hard evidence of manipulation."

In the United States, exit polling is not accurate enough to be used as tool for verification of actual election results. Discrepancies are usually attributed to sampling bias in the exit polls.

Exit polling can however be used to question official results. For example, in the 2000 election in Yugoslavia, Slobodan Milošević claimed that he had defeated Vojislav Koštunica. However, exit polling (this was not an EVEP) differed significantly from the reported count, suggesting that the official vote count had been corrupted. Public and media pressure eventually forced Milošević to concede.

Particularly in the aftermath of the 2000 United States presidential election recount in Florida, it has been claimed that the introduction of electronic voting machines introduced problems with recounts of official vote counts due to their lack of paper trail. EVEPs have been suggested as a remedy, especially in precincts that have historically had problems with fair vote counts.

Proponents claim that EVEP findings can be used to challenge dubious official vote counts in court. However, EVEPs are not perfectly accurate. Poll results are subject to a margin of error. That makes them difficult to use to challenge election results where the official vote count is close.

== Media exit polls ==
The difference between EVEPs and media exit polls lie in the purpose of the poll and polling methodologies. The purpose of a media exit poll is to strategically poll many precincts to obtain a representative sample for an entire district (e.g., state, city) so election outcomes can be predicted/dissected. Most polling is done before polling places close on Election Day so the exit poll results can be tabulated and immediately presented by news outlets. Since verifying particular precinct results is not an objective of media exit polls, typically only 1000-2000 voters are interviewed in an entire state. Relatively few voters are interviewed in any given precinct. Consequently, an EVEP can be considerably more reliable for targeted precincts than a media exit poll.
