= Exit poll =

Poll of voters taken after they exit polling stations

An election exit poll is a poll of voters taken immediately after they have exited the polling stations. A similar poll conducted before actual voters have voted is called an entrance poll. Pollsters – usually private companies working for newspapers or broadcasters – conduct exit polls to gain an early indication as to how an election has turned out, as in many elections the actual result may take many hours to count.

== History ==
There are different views on who invented the exit poll. Marcel van Dam, Dutch sociologist and former politician, says he was the inventor, by being the first to implement one during the Dutch legislative elections on 15 February 1967. Other sources say Warren Mitofsky, an American pollster, was the first. For CBS News, he devised an exit poll in the Kentucky gubernatorial election in November that same year. Notwithstanding this, the mention of the first exit polls date back to the 1940s when such a poll was held in Denver, Colorado.

== Purpose ==
Exit polls have two main purposes in established democracies. First, they are used to explain why voters voted as they did. This is typically done by asking voters which candidates they voted for, asking questions about why they voted the way they did in questionnaires, and collecting demographic data about voters. Second, they are used to project winners of electoral races on election night. Since most elections are held using a secret ballot, exit polling is often a faster way of collecting this information than waiting for official results to be published.

Additionally, exit polls have historically and throughout the world been used as a check against, and rough indicator of, the degree of election fraud in nondemocratic and competitive authoritarian regimes. Some examples of this include the 2004 Venezuelan recall referendum, the 2004 Ukrainian presidential election, and the 2024 Georgian parliamentary election.

They are used to command a mandate as well as to determine whether or not a particular political campaign was successful or not.

== Methods ==
The distribution of votes is not even across different polling stations and also varies at different times of day. As a result, a single exit poll may give an imperfect picture of the national vote. Instead, some exit polls calculate swing and turnout. Pollsters return to the same polling stations at the same times at each election, and by comparing the results with previous exit polls they can calculate how the distribution of votes has changed in that constituency. This swing is then applied to other similar constituencies, allowing an estimate of how national voting patterns have changed. The polling locations are chosen to cover the entire gamut of society and where possible, to include especially critical marginal seats. Data is presented in one of three ways, either as a table, graph or written interpretation.

The US exit polls have long been conducted by Edison Research for the National Election Pool of media organizations, interviewing a sample of voters as they leave a polling place. These pollsters choose precincts whose mix of voters is representative of the broader area. These voters may not be standard. For example, minority voters in a mixed precinct may vote at different rates and for different candidates than minority voters in a mostly minority precinct. The Associated Press since 2018 has switched to phone polling, which does not need to be grouped by precinct. They start calling a random sample of voters until they vote, to cover mailed ballots, early voting, and election-day voting.

== Problems ==
Akin to all opinion polls, exit polls by nature do include a margin of error. A famous example of exit poll error occurred in the 1992 UK General Election when two exit polls predicted a hung parliament. The actual vote revealed that Conservative Party government under John Major held their position, though with a significantly reduced majority. Investigations into this failure identified a number of causes including differential response rates (the Shy Tory Factor), the use of inadequate demographic data and poor choice of sampling points.

Another example of this was the 2024 Indian general election, in which after the voting ended, exit polls showed that the incumbent Bharatiya Janata Party–NDA government of Narendra Modi would win 350 to 370 seats in the Parliament of India and thus a landslide, but the actual results showed the opposition's strong performance and led to the BJP failing to gain a majority on its own.

As exit polls require a baseline to compare swing against, they are not reliable for one-off votes such as the Scottish independence referendum or the UK EU membership referendum. Because exit polls can't reach people who voted by postal ballot or another form of absentee voting, they may be biased towards certain demographics and miss swings that only occur among absentee voters. For example, in the May round of the 2016 Austrian presidential election, exit polls correctly pointed to a narrow lead for Norbert Hofer among those who voted at a polling station. However, the postal votes (which made up about 12% of the total vote) were slightly but definitively in favour of his rival Alexander Van der Bellen, and ultimately gave Van der Bellen victory. This could be considered a non-U.S. example of the phenomenon known as "blue shift" in the U.S.

== Organizations that conduct election exit polling ==
Logo of Korean Election Pool (KEP), South Korean election Exit Poll consist of three major broadcasting networks.

In the United States, the National Election Pool (NEP), conducts a joint election exit poll. As of 2018, the NEP members are ABC, CBS, CNN, and NBC (formerly also included AP and Fox News). Since 2004 this exit poll has been conducted for the NEP by Edison Media Research. Edison uses probability-based sampling. In 2020, in-person interviews on Election Day were conducted at a random sample of 115 polling locations nationwide among 7,774 Election Day voters. The results also include 4,919 telephone interviews with early and absentee voters.

The release of exit poll data in the United States is controlled. During the 2012 elections, protocols to quarantine the release of data were put in place.

In Egypt, the Egyptian Center for Public Opinion Research conducted two exit polls in 2014 for the constitutional referendum and presidential election.

In South Korea, exit polls have been conducted by Kantar Public for KBS, SBS, and MBC.

In India, exit polls are conducted by private news broadcasting channels and newspaper agencies such as The Times Group, CVoter, India Today, etc. India being the largest democracy in the world has many agencies publishing exit polls which roughly predict the outcome of the elections.

In Singapore, where exit polls are banned due to privacy issues, a variant of the exit poll, dubbed sample counts, are used instead and have been implemented in every election since 2015.

== Criticism and controversy ==
Widespread criticism of exit polling has occurred in cases, especially in the United States, where exit poll results have appeared and/or have provided a basis for projecting winners before all real polls have closed, thereby possibly influencing election results. States have tried and failed to restrict exit polling; however, it is protected by the First Amendment. In the 1980 US presidential election, NBC predicted a victory for Ronald Reagan at 8:15 pm EST, based on exit polls of 20,000 voters. It was 5:15 pm on the West Coast, and the polls were still open. There was speculation that voters stayed away after hearing the results. Thereafter, television networks have voluntarily adopted the policy of not projecting any victor within a state until all polls have closed for that state. In the 2000 US presidential election it was alleged that media organizations released exit poll results for Florida before the polls closed in the Republican-leaning counties of the panhandle, as part of the westernmost area of the state is one hour behind the main peninsula. A study by economist John Lott found an "unusual" decline in Panhandle voter turnout compared to previous elections, and that the networks' early call of Florida for Democrat Al Gore may have depressed Republican turnout in other states where the polls remained open.

Some countries, including the United Kingdom, Italy, France, Germany, India and Singapore, have made it a criminal offence to release exit poll figures before all polling stations have closed.

In some instances, problems with exit polls have encouraged polling groups to pool data in hopes of increased accuracy. This proved successful during the 2005 UK general election, when the BBC and ITV merged their data to show an exit poll giving Labour a majority of 66 seats, which turned out to be the exact figure. This method was also successful in the 2007 Australian federal election, where the collaboration of Sky News, Seven Network and Auspoll provided an almost exact 53 per cent two party-preferred victory to Labor over the ruling Coalition.

There was a widespread controversy during the 2014 Indian general election when the Election Commission of India barred media organisations from displaying exit poll results until the votes had been counted. This was followed by a strong protest from the media which caused the Election Commission to withdraw its statement and confirm that the exit polls could be shown at 6:30 PM on 12 May after the last vote was cast. Since then exit polls have been prohibited in India while the polls are open, only post-poll opinion surveys are allowed.
