= Eugene Cho =

American evangelical pastor

- 유진 조
- Born: Eugene E. Cho; Seoul, South Korea
- Education: University of California, Davis; Princeton Theological Seminary
- Title: President of Bread for the World (since 2020)
- Spouse: Minhee Cho

Ecclesiastical career
- Religion: Christianity (Protestant)
- Church: Evangelical Covenant Church
- Ordained: 2004

Eugene E. Cho (Note: Korean: 유진 조.) is an American evangelical pastor. In July 2020, he became the third President and CEO of Bread for the World, a Christian advocacy organization urging U.S. decision makers to do all they can to pursue a world without hunger.

Eugene is Co-Chair of the U.S. Nutrition CEO Council, the body of leaders from international NGOs encouraging the U.S. government, civil society, corporations, and other stakeholders to make global nutrition expertise into law and policy. He also serves on the board of Interaction, the largest U.S.-based alliance of INGOs and partners, and on the Coordinating Committee for the Circle of Protection, the coalition of church bodies and related ministries who have united across theological, sociological, and political differences to advocate for U.S. government policies that better address the needs of people experiencing poverty and vulnerability.

== Biography ==
Cho was born in Seoul, immigrated to the United States at age six, and grew up in San Francisco. Cho attended Lowell High School. After undergraduate studies at University of California, Davis, Cho completed a Master of Divinity degree at Princeton Theological Seminary.

Ordained in the Evangelical Covenant Church, Cho and his wife Minhee founded Quest Church in Seattle, Washington, serving as its senior pastor from 2001 to 2018. He also founded One Day's Wages in 2009, to alleviate extreme global poverty, where he still serves as Founder and Visionary.

In March 2020, Cho was elected to become the next president of the Christian advocacy group Bread for the World and assumed his post in July 2020.

Eugene has been recognized by the Department of Homeland Security as an Outstanding American by Choice, which was established to recognize “the significant contributions and achievements of naturalized U.S. citizens.”

== Works ==
- Cho, Eugene (2014). Overrated: Are We More in Love with the Idea of Changing the World Than Actually Changing the World?. David C Cook. ISBN 978-0-7814-1236-0.
- Cho, Eugene (2020). Thou Shalt Not Be a Jerk: A Christian's Guide to Engaging Politics. David C Cook. ISBN 978-0-8307-7891-1.
- Cho, Eugene; Page, Samira Izadi, eds. (2021). No Longer Strangers: Transforming Evangelism with Immigrant Communities. Eerdmans. ISBN 978-0-8028-7865-6.
