= Arthur Simon =

American pastor and anti-hunger activist (1930-2023)

- Born: July 28, 1930; Eugene, Oregon, U.S.
- Died: November 14, 2023 (aged 93)
- Education: Dana College (Blair, Nebraska); Concordia Seminary (St. Louis, Missouri)
- Relatives: Paul Simon (brother)

Ecclesiastical career
- Church: Lutheran Church
- Ordained: 1959
- Writings: Silence Can Kill: Speaking Up to End Hunger and Make Our Economy Work for Everyone ISBN 978-0-8028-7747-5; Bread for the World ISBN 0-8091-2670-2; The Politics of World Hunger (with Paul Simon) ISBN 0-06-127776-2; How Much Is Enough? Hungering for God in an Affluent Culture ISBN 0-8010-6408-2; Faces of Poverty ISBN 978-0020894001; Harvesting Peace: The Arms Race and Human Need ISBN 1-55612-352-3; Grace at the Table: Ending Hunger in God’s World (with David Beckmann) ISBN 0-8091-3866-2
- Congregations: Pastor, Trinity Lutheran Church, Lower East Side, Manhattan (NYC)
- Offices held: [Director, Washington Office], Christian Children's Fund (Washington); President emeritus, Bread for the World
- Title: Reverend

Arthur Simon (July 28, 1930 – November 14, 2023) was an American Lutheran minister, founder and president of Bread for the World, a citizens' lobby on hunger, which he served for almost two decades.

== Life and career ==
Arthur Simon was born in Eugene, Oregon on July 28, 1930. He was a graduate of Dana College in Blair, Nebraska, and Concordia Seminary in St. Louis, Missouri. He was an ordained Lutheran minister. His brother was United States Senator Paul Simon (D-IL). He pastored at Trinity Lutheran Church on New York City's Lower East Side from 1961 to 1972. As a pastor, Simon became involved in responding to emergencies associated with hunger and poverty. Wanting to address the root causes of hunger, Simon formed a committee of seven Catholics and seven Protestants in 1974 called Bread for the World. He became Bread's first president, holding the position for sixteen years. After retiring from Bread, he directed the Washington Office of the Christian Children's Fund from 1992 to 1997.

His book Bread for the World won the national Religious Book Award, and was described by the Nobel Prize economist Gunnar Myrdal as a "clear and convincing" analysis of world hunger. His most recent book is Silence Can Kill: Speaking Up to End Hunger and Make our Economy Work for Everyone. In 2009 he published The Rising of Bread for the World: An Outcry of Citizens Against Hunger. Prior to that, he authored, with David Beckmann, Grace at the Table: Ending Hunger in God’s World. His previous books include Faces of Poverty and Harvesting Peace: The Arms Race and Human Need. He has also had articles published in many national newspapers and journals.

Simon received a number of awards and honorary degrees, including the Presidential Hunger Award for Lifetime Achievement. He has served on the advisory board for the Center for Public Justice. He was the 35th recipient the Pacem in Terris Peace and Freedom Award in 2004. The honor was named after a 1963 encyclical letter, Pacem in terris (Peace on Earth), by Pope John XXIII that calls upon all people of good will to secure peace among all nations.

Simon died at his Maryland home on November 14, 2023, at the age of 93.
