= Bread for the World =

US-based non-profit organization

- Founded: August 3, 1982; 43 years ago
- Type: Nonprofit organization
- Tax ID no.: 13-2803276
- Legal status: 501(c)(4) organization
- Purpose: To advocate for changes in policies, programs and conditions that allow hunger and poverty to persist, both in the United States and around the world
- Headquarters: Washington, D.C., US
- Coordinates: 38.884480°N 77.015486°W
- President: Eugene Cho
- Board Chair: Jeremy Everett
- Subsidiaries: Bread for the World Institute
- Revenue: $5,892,247 (2018)
- Expenses: $5,012,233 (2018)
- Endowment: $616,394 (2018)
- Employees: 95 (2018)
- Website: bread.org

Bread for the World is a non-partisan Christian advocacy organization based in the United States that advocates for policy changes to end hunger and helps others do the same, which might include politicians meeting with their constituents and working in coalition with other organizations.

== History ==
In October 1972, a group of Catholics and Protestants met to reflect on how Christians could be mobilized to influence US policies that address the causes of hunger. Led by Arthur Simon, the group began to test the idea in the spring of 1974. By year-end, more than 500 people had joined Bread for the World to advocate for an end to hunger. Bread for the World was officially incorporated on August 3, 1982.

In September 1991, David M. Beckmann succeeded Simon as president of the organization. Beckmann retired in June 2020, and is succeeded by Eugene Cho, the founder and visionary of One Day's Wages.

Bread for the World is a founding member of The ONE Campaign.

In July 2020 Bread for the World requested and accepted the resignation of US Congressman Ted Yoho from its board of directors. In a National Public Radio interview about the resignation, the President of Bread for the World, Eugene Cho, said "We have expectations for our board of directors. We are not an organization that demands perfection of any of us, because clearly we'll all fall short ... but we did feel that his [Ted Yoho's] comments were inappropriate, not reflective of the ethical standards and Christian values that we seek to uphold as an organization and for our leaders."
