= Paul Simon Public Policy Institute =

- Founder: Paul Simon
- Established: 1997
- Mission: The Paul Simon Public Policy Institute acts on significant and controversial issues impacting Illinois, the United States and the world. The Institute focuses its efforts on fostering ethical conduct in government, opportunity and fair treatment for people in America and throughout the world, and promoting responsible citizenship for all Americans.
- Formerly called: Public Policy Institute
- Address: 1231 Lincoln Dr. Southern Illinois University Carbondale, Carbondale, IL 62901
- Location: Carbondale, IL
- Website: https://paulsimoninstitute.siu.edu

The Paul Simon Public Policy Institute is located at Southern Illinois University Carbondale. It was founded by Paul Simon, a former two-term U.S. Senator from Illinois and one-time candidate for the Democratic Party nomination for President of the United States. Opening in 1997, the Institute differentiates itself from similar organizations by working directly with elected officials and others to fashion and implement change in public policy.

The institute is bipartisan and sponsors many on-campus programs featuring state and local politicians, educators, entrepreneurs, and many others. Throughout the year, the institute hosts lectures and conferences around relevant topics featuring significant and controversial issues impacting the region, the state, the nation, and the world.

Located at SIUC, the institute offers a variety of opportunities for students, including legislative internship programs and the Paul Simon Institute Ambassadors, which allows students to network and volunteer their time in assisting the Institute staff in outreach efforts to the campus and community.

Previous directors include David Yepsen, who served from 2009 to 2016, and Mike Lawrence, who served as director from 2004 to 2008. Simon served as Institute director from 1997 to his death in 2003. Simon died in Springfield, Illinois following heart surgery at the age of 75 in 2003. John T. Shaw served as the Director of the Institute from 2018-2026.

== Initiatives ==
=== Speaker Series & Events ===
The institute regularly hosts lectures and speaker series, including Pizza & Politics, which connects students and the community to political figures. Its Women's Government Day and Youth Government Day bring women and young people to the Illinois Capitol in Springfield. And its Metro East Youth Leadership Weekend brings young African American men from the Metro East St. Louis area to campus for leadership development and community service.

The Institute launched the Renewing Illinois Student Summit in the spring of 2019 with a summit of university students from across the state. The inaugural event's theme was "Ambitious Dreams and Practical Steps to Revive the Prairie State." In 2020, the theme was to be "One Illinois: Noble Aspiration or Impossible Dream?" The 2020 summit was reformatted due to the COVID-19 pandemic, and the Institute developed a booklet with letters from Illinois General Assembly leaders, a reflection of the time by one of the state's leading historians, and several travel essays that underscore the beauty and diversity of the state. While preparing for the 2020 summit, the Institute asked 25 prominent Illinoisans to respond to the question: "If you were teaching an 'Illinois 101' course to highly motivated undergraduates, what five books would you assign them to read?" The result is the institute's "Illinois 101 Recommended Reading List" containing essential reading about Illinois history and politics.

The Institute in 2021 launched the Future of Illinois Project, which will convene demographers, historians, political scientists, social activists, futurists, and business leaders to peer out over the horizon and assess the fundamental challenges facing Illinois.

=== Paul Simon-Jim Edgar Prairie State Statesmanship Award ===
On Nov. 16, 2020, former Illinois Gov. Jim Edgar and the Paul Simon Public Policy Institute announced a new annual award that celebrates exceptional leadership in Illinois. The award recognizes leaders who display vision, courage, compassion, civility, effectiveness and bipartisanship in their work. The award will be announced at the August meeting of the Edgar Fellows Program.

The inaugural award in 2021 recognized 11 Republican members of the Illinois General Assembly who supported a critical budget package in July 2017 to end the Illinois budget impasse. The GOP lawmakers joined with Democrats to override then-Governor Bruce Rauner's veto of a budget compromise. This vote ended the two-year fiscal stalemate that tarnished Illinois' reputation, damaged schools, battered the state's credit rating, and led to about $15 billion in unpaid bills. The budget that emerged allowed Illinois to avoid further downgrading of its debt and ensured that state government would resume regular operations.

=== Simon Review ===
The Simon Review is a series of research papers that explore public policy issues, especially in Illinois. In 2021, Steve Brown, press secretary for longtime Illinois House Speaker Michael Madigan, wrote an exit essay detailing his time working in legislative communications in the statehouse. Professors John Jackson and John Foster also updated their research on the Illinois public budgeting process, finding that despite political messaging, downstate Illinois receives more from public coffers than it contributes in tax dollars.

== History ==
Paul Simon lived for many years in the small town of Makanda, south of Carbondale, where he was a professor and director of the SIU Public Policy Institute. There, he worked to foster the Institute into becoming a thinktank that could advance the lives of all people. Activities included going to Liberia and Croatia to monitor their elections, bringing major speakers to campus, denouncing the death penalty, trying to end the United States embargo against Cuba, fostering political courage among his students, and promoting amendments to the Constitution to end the Electoral College and to limit the president to a single six-year term of office. Concerning the Electoral College during the controversial Election 2000 fiasco, Simon said, "I think if somebody gets the majority vote, they should be president. But, I don't think the system is going to be changed."

Simon believed modern presidents practice "followship" rather than leadership: "We have been more and more leaning on polls to decide what we're going to do, and you don't get leadership from polls... and not just at the presidential level. It's happening with senators, House members and even state legislators sometimes [when they] conduct polls to find out where people stand on something."
