= Entrance poll =

Poll taken as voters enter polling stations

An entrance poll is a poll that is taken before voters have cast their votes at the polling stations. They are mainly used in caucuses. It is akin to an opinion poll in the sense that it asks who the voter plans to vote for or some similar set of questions. The possibility that the prospective voter might change his mind after the poll is very small compared to that of an opinion poll, therefore the margin of error of an entrance poll is expected to be lower than that of an opinion poll. However, the methodology of conducting an entrance poll is closer to that of an exit poll, where actual voters are being queried as opposed to potential voters in an opinion poll.

Estimates provided by entrance polls can be obtained more quickly than those of exit polls because the people can be questioned earlier. However, they are also possibly subject to a higher margin of error as early voters are given a higher preference than in exit polls. Furthermore, entrance polls are based upon a future event, meaning there is always the possibility that a voter may change his or her mind between being asked questions for an entrance poll and then actually voting.
