= Lloyd Harris (American politician) =

American politician (1895–1972)

Thomas Lloyd Harris

Member of the Illinois House of Representatives
- In office c. 1935–1969

Personal details
- Born: August 23, 1895 Montpelier, Indiana, U.S.
- Died: November 18, 1972 (aged 77) Granite City, Illinois, U.S.
- Party: Democratic

Thomas Lloyd Harris (August 23, 1895 – November 18, 1972) was an American politician who served as a member of the Illinois House of Representatives for sixteen terms, an "almost continuous" service of all but two years from 1935 to 1969. He was known for his work in securing the passage of a $25 million bond issue to establish Southern Illinois University Edwardsville.

Harris was born in Montpelier, Indiana, on August 23, 1895, but lived in Granite City, Illinois, for most of his life. He and his wife, Anna Mae, had five children. He was an Episcopalian.

Harris died at a Granite City nursing home on November 18, 1972, aged 77.
