= Dactylellina haptotyla =

Scientific classification
- Kingdom: Fungi
- Division: Ascomycota
- Class: Orbiliomycetes
- Order: Orbiliales
- Family: Orbiliaceae
- Genus: Dactylellina
- Species: D. haptotyla

Binomial name
- Dactylellina haptotyla (Drechsler) M. Scholler, Hagedorn & A. Rubner (1999)

Synonyms
- Arthrobotrys haptotyla Drechsler (1977); Golovinia haptotyla (Drechsler) Mekht (1967); Candelabrella haptotyla (Drechsler) Rifai (1968); Dactylella haptotyla (Drechsler) de Hoog & Oorschot (1985); Monacrosporium haptotylum (Drechsler) Xing Z. Liu & K.Q. Zhang (1994); Dactylium candidum Nees (1817); Dactylaria sclerohypha Drechsler (1950); Golovinia capitulopaga Mekht. (1979); Monacrosporium yunnanense K.Q. Zhang, Xing Z. Liu & L. Cao (1996); Dactylellina candidum (Nees) Yan Li (2006)

Species of fungus

Dactylellina haptotyla is a common soil-living fungus that develops structures to capture nematodes as nutrient source. In the presence of nematodes, spores can germinate into sticky knobs or non-constricting loops. The fungus traps nematodes with sticky knobs and non-constricting loops, then breakdown the cuticle, and penetrates the body of nematodes to obtain nutrients. For its predatory nature, Dactylellina haptotyla is also considered as nematode-trapping fungus or carnivorous fungus.

== Taxonomy ==
Dactylellina haptotyla belongs to the family Orbiliaceae. Before nematode-trapping fungi were studied phylogenetically, Dactylellina haptotyla had been classified with more than five synonyms, and it is commonly known as Arthrobotrys candida, Monacrosporium haptotyla and Dactylella haptotyla. The classification was ambiguous because the fungus does not form non-constricting loops all the time. For example, M. candidum and M.yunnanense form stalk adhesive knobs and non-constricting rings, while M. sclerohypha and M.haptotylum only form adhesive knobs. Yet, these four species are all synonyms of Dactylellina haptotyla.

In 1999, the carnivorous fungi of Orbiliaceae has been reclassified based on rDNA and β-tubulin datasets. Nematode-trapping fungi can be grouped into four monophyletic clade (Arhtrobotrys, Monacrosporium, Dactylella and Dactylellina) which correspond to their nematode-trapping structures. Therefore, Dactylellina haptotyla has been classified as genus Dactylellina because of its non-constricting loops and sticky knobs structure.

== Growth and morphology ==
Dactylellina haptotyla can be isolated on corn meal agar. After fifteen days of incubation, the colour of colonies changes from hyaline (unpigmented) to whitish or faintly pink colour. Colony diameter can expand by 4 cm at 25 °C within 10 days.

Conidiophores are hyaline branches that are constructed by 5-7 septate. It is about 100–335μm long, 2–3.7 μm wide at the base. 2-12 (mostly 3-5) branches can grow near apex with conidia. Macroconidia are also hyaline and in spindle-shape (truncate at the base and narrow down at the basal end). It is usually constructed by 2-5 septate, and approximately 27.5–57.5 × 7.5–12.5μm^{2} (mostly 35 × 9μm^{2}) in size. No chlamydospores have been observed in cultures.

The spindle spores can develop into adhesive knob in the presence of nematodes. The adhesive knob is a globose adhesive cell locates at the end of non-adhesive stalk which is composed by one to three cells. The adhesive knob contains membrane-bound vesicles which is approximately 0.2-0.5μm. The other trapping structure, non-constricting loop, is constructed by three cells which elongate from stalk and fuse back to base. The inner area of the loop is sticky.

== Nematode-trapping features ==
Dactyllelina haptotyla traps nematodes by adhesive knobs and non-constricting loops.

When nematodes thrust into non-constricting loops or adhesive knobs, the trapping structures wedge the nematodes by the sticky surface. Nematodes struggle and sometimes become more tightly wedged because they contact other loops or knobs. In some cases, the struggle may be so violent that the nematode can escape and detach the knobs or loops from stalks. The detached knobs or loops stay on the nematode's body and travel along. Eventually, the fungus will paralyze and digest the nematode. Evolutionary, this assist the Dactylellina haptotyla to migrate to new sites and explore food sources.

The adhesive knob contains membrane-bound vesicles, 0.2-0.5μm in diameter, with various electron densities. The electron-dense vesicles are rarely seen in stalk cells' cytoplasm. When sticky knob adheres a nematode, electron-dense vesicles migrate toward nematode and discard the enzymatic contents to degrade the cuticle. The sub-cuticle swells and infection bulbs permeate the body. The infection bulb is separated from the sticky knob with septum. It can take about 36 hours to degrade a nematode, and a new trap will form afterward.

Linoleic acid, has been identified in the mycelial extracts. It is an aliphatic compound that is antibacterial and nematocidal.

Although the nematode-attractant has not been identified, a common hypothesis is the nematode-trapping fungus are able to release pheromones to attract nematodes.

== Genomics ==
The total genome size of Dactylellina haptotyla is estimated as 40.4Mb with 271 genes/Mb and 3.3 exons/gene.

Based on a cDNA microarray study, 23.3% of the studied gene pool are differentially expressed in mycelium and knobs. Some of those genes are responsible for cell polarity regulation. For example, profilin and cofilin are downregulated in knobs. Moreover, the transcription pattern of sticky knobs shows similarities with appressoria of plant pathogenic fungi like Magnaporthe grisea and Blumeria graminis. Particularly, peptide sequences of some defense and stress response protein are significantly similar.

When Caenorhabditis elegans adheres, the transcriptional pattern changes significantly as well. The initial transcriptional responses begin after one hour of attachment. Approximately 40% of nematodes were paralyzed after four hours, and 372 gene clusters are upregulated only during this stage of infection. Among the 372 gene clusters, 79% of genes are specific to Dactylellina haptotyla or other closely related species.

On the other hand, 26 CFEM-containing proteins and 28 GLEYA-containing proteins are identified as adhesive molecules on knobs and loops. CFEM-containing proteins function as adhesion molecules or cell-surface receptors. GLEYA-containing proteins bind to lectin-like ligand domain.

APES protein with unknown function was also identified in Dactylellina haptotyla.

== Habitat and ecology ==
Dactylellina haptotyla is distributed in soil worldwide.

In 1998, Jaffee, Ferris and Scow compared the population of nematode-trapping fungi in conventional and organic systems. A conventional system was soil plots that were fertilized by inorganic matters and grown with cover crop every four year. The organic system was soil plots that were treated with manure and grown with cover crop every year. Different nematode-trapping fungi prefers different systems. Dactylellina haptotyla is more populated in conventional plots. Yet, the cause of impact in population was unclear. Also, number of the fungus increased when water content was higher in soil. In general, nematode-trapping fungi prefer to colonize on cellulose and lignin substrates with low nitrogen content.

== Industrial use ==
The use of Dactylellina haptotyla as bio-control agent in agricultural industry has been explored. However, the application has not been proven yet.
