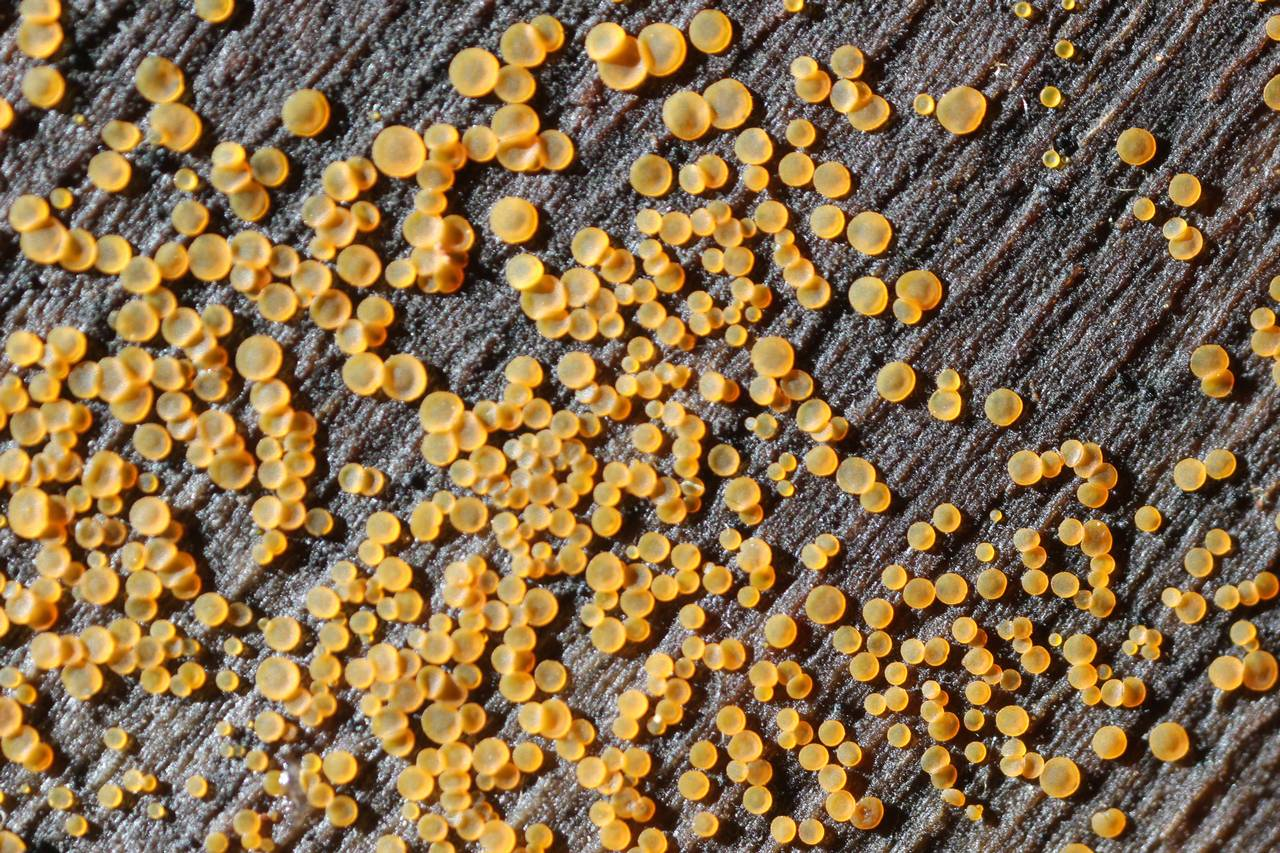
- Orbilia xanthostigma

Scientific classification
- Kingdom: Fungi
- Division: Ascomycota
- Class: Orbiliomycetes
- Order: Orbiliales
- Family: Orbiliaceae
- Genus: Orbilia; Fr. (1836)

Type species
- Orbilia leucostigma (Fr.) Fr. (1849)

Species
- ~58, see text

Synonyms
- Cheilodonta Boud. (1885); Hyalinia Boud. (1885); Orbiliella Kirschst. (1938; Orbiliaster Dennis (1954)

= Orbilia =

Genus of fungi

Orbilia is a genus of fungi in the family Orbiliaceae. Anamorphs of this genus include the Arthrobotrys, Dactylella, Dicranidion, Dwayaangam, Helicoön, Monacrosporium, and Trinacrium. The genus was established in 1836 by Elias Magnus Fries to accommodate the species Peziza leucostigma. The mycologist Josef Velenovský wrote articles describing species found in Bohemia and Moravia (Czechoslovakia). In 1951, Fred Jay Seaver recorded 20 species in North America, and R.W.G. Dennis later described 9 species from Venezuela. According to the Dictionary of the Fungi (10th edition, 2008), there are about 58 species in the genus.

== Species ==
- Orbilia acuum
- Orbilia alnea
- Orbilia antenorea
- Orbilia arundinacea
- Orbilia aurantiorubra
- Orbilia auricolor
- Orbilia bannaensis
- Orbilia bomiensis
- Orbilia brevicauda
- Orbilia coccinella
- Orbilia comma
- Orbilia corculispora
- Orbilia cruenta
- Orbilia cunninghamii
- Orbilia curvatispora
- Orbilia cyathea
- Orbilia delicatula
- Orbilia dorsalia
- Orbilia epipora
- Orbilia eucalypti
- Orbilia euonymi
- Orbilia falciformis
- Orbilia fimicoloides
- Orbilia gambelii
- Orbilia leucostigma
- Orbilia luteorubella
- Orbilia luzularum
- Orbilia milinana
- Orbilia pellucida
- Orbilia pilifera
- Orbilia piloboloides
- Orbilia pisciformis
- Orbilia quercus
- Orbilia rectispora
- Orbilia retrusa
- Orbilia sarraziniana
- Orbilia scolecospora
- Orbilia tenebricosa
- Orbilia tricellularia
- Orbilia umbilicata
- Orbilia vermiformis
- Orbilia vinosa
- Orbilia xanthostigma
- Orbilia yuanensis
