= Fungal behavior =

Fungal behavior describes non-autologic actions. Fungi are capable of a variety of behaviors, i.e., responses to external stimuli. Behavior, in ecology, refers to the decision-making, interactions, and learning that an organism does within its environment. While some activities are autonomic, certain functions can be described as behavior.

== Nematophagous fungi ==
Nematodes are a class of small, microscopic worms. Some fungi, such as Arthrobotrys dactyloides, are capable of creating constricting rings or adhesive knobs in order to predate (eat) nematodes, similar to a carnivorous plant. Nematophagous species predate them.

== Avoidance response ==
Fungi such as Phycomyces blakesleeanus employ sensory mechanisms to avoid obstacles as their fruiting body grows, including an avoidance response. P. blakesleeanus grows away from stationary objects, possibly through chemotaxis. Some sort of gas or water vapor is emitted, allowing the fungus to grow away from obstacles. The solid object does not allow the gas to spread as easily as empty space would, concentrating the substance.

== Hormones ==
One hormone-like signaling molecule used by many fungi is cyclic adenosine monophosphate (cAMP), which regulates morphogenesis and behavioral responses such as filamentation, notably via the Ras1-cAMP signaling pathway documented in Candida albicans.

== See also ==
- Chemotaxis
- Nematophagous fungi
- Behavioral ecology
- Mycorrhizal network
