= Arthrobotrys musiformis =

Scientific classification
- Kingdom: Fungi
- Division: Ascomycota
- Class: Orbiliomycetes
- Order: Orbiliales
- Family: Orbiliaceae
- Genus: Arthrobotrys
- Species: A. musiformis

Binomial name
- Arthrobotrys musiformis Charles Drechsler

Synonyms
- Synonymy: Candelabralla musiformis; Trichothesium musiformis

Species of fungus

Arthrobotrys musiformis (/aɹ.θɹoʊ'ba.tɹıs mju.sı'foɹ.mıs/) is a species of nematode catching fungi, genus Arthrobotrys (from Greek, meaning "jointed bunch of grapes"). This, like other Arthrobotrys species, captures and feeds on nematodes. It is widespread, with its initial discovery being in Norfolk, Virginia. This species demonstrates promising anti-helminth potential, and is hypothesized to reduce the number of parasitic nematodes in plants and livestock as either a biocontrol or through isolating metabolites.

== Taxonomy ==
Arthrobotrys musiformis is a fungus belonging to Orbiliomycetes within Ascomycota that was described by Charles Drechsler in 1937. The first samples came from rotting spinach plants in Norfolk, Virginia; with additional samples from Florida and Hawaii. Synonyms for the fungi are Candelabralla musiformis and Trichothesium musiformis.

Morphological taxonomy of Arthrobotrys places A. musiformis as most closely related to A. anchonia and A. dactyloids on the basis of their unbranched, non-nodular conidiophores. However, A. musiformis is unique from these species due to its 2 dimensional predatory structures while A. anchonia and A. dactyloids both produce constricting rings.

== Morphology ==
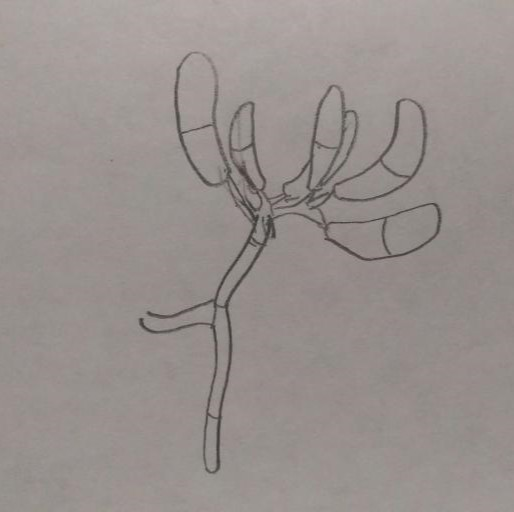
A drawing of conidia of Arthrobotrys musiformis based on the work of N.F. Gray and Karen Haard.

Arthrobotrys musiformis has septate hyphae less than 5 μm in diameter that form branching mycelium that may become very dense to catch nematodes with. When kept as a colony, the colony is white and radial

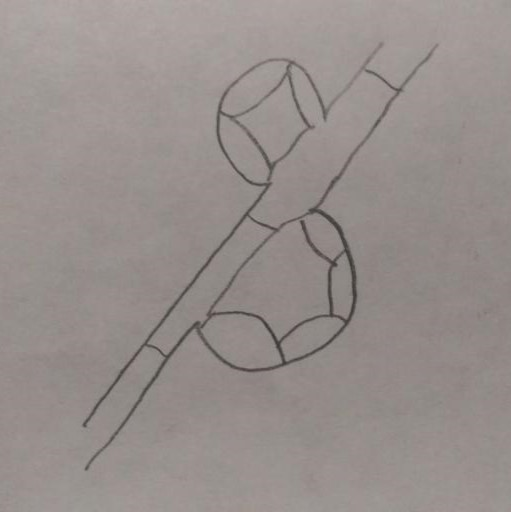
A drawing of adhesive nets of Arthrobotrys musiformis based on the work of N.F. Gray and Karen Haard.

This fungi produces spores on curved, obvoid conidia that are 32 to 42 μm in length and 10 to 12 μm in width. The conidia are developed in 1 to 2 weeks on conidiophores that range between 250 and 375 μm long. Following germination of conidia or production of nets, A. musiformis may produce chlamdospores 10-20 μm in diameter. A. musiformis may be identified using its conidiaphores as they form a globalar, 'head' structure containing 5 to 15 conidia.

To catch nematodes, the fungi produces 3 dimensional adhesive nets. These adhesive nets can be used to identify A. musiformis from its close relatives, as many Arthrobotrys produce identifying, horseshoe like 2 dimensional rings. The fungi forms nets with 2 to 7 loops 18-20 μm in inside diameter that connect back to the mycelium near where the net branched off. These nets may capture nematodes by entangling them, though some studies suggest they are captured using strong adhesives on the net instead. Following capture, the fungi may develop assimilative hyphae that grow into the nematode and digest it.

== Ecology ==
Arthrobotrys musiformis obtains nutrients through breaking down organic debris or capturing nematodes, known as saprotrophy and nematophagy respectively. These two modes require the fungus to switch in lifestyle, which is accompanied by differential regulation of gene expression. Some studies find that nematophagous fungi have limited impact on large scale ecological systems in California, though they caution that it is difficult to confidently reject fungi's involvement in processes such as the distribution of nematodes.

In China, studies indicate that A. musiformis may be a dominant nematophagous fungi species in livestock fields, able to survive in soil and feces while continuing predacious and reproductive activity. The success of A. musiformis in this environment is estimated to be a result of lower nutritional costs, higher growing rates and greater reproductive ability in feces. While capable of surviving temperatures as low as 1 degree Celsius, the fungi performs best in wet, warm environments, with the greatest population being recorded in the rainy season at the end of summer. Likewise, the fungus did poorly during dry and cold weather at the end of winter

== Habitat ==
While the first description of A. musiformis described it as being distributed along the East Coast of the United States, additional studies describe the distribution as ranging into Ireland, Canada, Denmark, and China.

Despite A. musiformis' nematophagous niche, it is outcompeted by other nematophagous fungi and instead performs better in environments where it can rely on saprotrophy as well. In addition, it is resistant to some heavy metals, allowing it to survive in environments with fewer available nematodes or greater environmental toxins than its close relatives. As such, A. musiformis performs well in agricultural areas, where it may outcompete purely saprotrophic by consuming nematodes but also resist heavy metals common to those areas so they may outcompete other nematophagous fungi.

== Uses ==
=== Anti-helminth potential ===
Nematodes are harmful to agriculture, costing the industry an excess of $100 billion (globally) annually. Approximately 100 known species of nematode are economically relevant crop pests, with soil-borne nematodes causing the greatest losses. Anti-helminth medicines have successfully combated infections, though resistance to these drugs is increasing, limiting the effectiveness of current treatments.

Arthrobotrys musiformis produces multiple metabolites with potential as nematocides; including linoleic alcohol and desferriferrichrome. Both linoleic alcohol and desferriferrichrome are produced in higher concentrations when A. musiformis transitions to its predatory stage. Linoleic alcohol has limited nematodacidal activity, but one study proposes that it kills nematodes by transforming into linoleic acid which may oxidize linoleic alcohol found in the nematode. Desferriferrichrome belongs to a family of chemicals called siderophores that is used to uptake iron and may be used to kill nematodes.

One study found that culture filtrate of A. musiformis colonies decreased the number of viable adult nematodes in lamb feces after being given orally, though the study concluded that the difference was not statistically significant, but encourages further research due to the benefit of finding a biocontrol option given the risks of contamination that come with chemical nematocides. This study, unlike many other studies in biocontrol, looks for potential uses for Arthrobotrys in treating animals directly rather than controlling nematodes at the level of substrate or fecal treatments.

Another study finds a reduction of 97% in M. hapla nematodes on tomato plants following introduction of A. musiformis. The authors report that A. musiformis can suppress nematode infection in crop roots, with less damage occurring in the roots in treated plants at all measured dates and with anti-helminth activity surpassing that of synthetic treatments on day 30. Additionally, they conclude that further research into A. musiformis as a biocontrol agent is recommended as a means to significantly improve plant health while avoiding the contamination and off target effects of current pesticides.
