= Orbilia xanthostigma =

Scientific classification
- Kingdom: Fungi
- Division: Ascomycota
- Class: Orbiliomycetes
- Order: Orbiliales
- Family: Orbiliaceae
- Genus: Orbilia
- Species: O. xanthostigma

Binomial name
- Orbilia xanthostigma (Fr.) Fr.

Synonyms
- List: Calloria xanthostigma (Fr.) W. Phillips; Mollisia xanthostigma (Fr.) Gillet; Orbilia leucostigma subsp. xanthostigma (Fr.) P. Karst.; Orbilia leucostigma var. xanthostigma (Fr.) P. Karst.; Peziza leucostigma subsp. xanthostigma (Fr.) P. Karst.; Peziza xanthostigma Fr.; Calloria coccinella subsp. delicatula (P. Karst.) Sacc.; Orbilia coccinella subsp. delicatula (P. Karst.) P. Karst.; Orbilia coccinella var. delicatula (P. Karst.) Boud.; Orbilia delicatula (P. Karst.) P. Karst.; Peziza delicatula P. Karst.; Hymenoscyphus rufulus (Schwein.) Kuntze; Lachnea rufula (Schwein.) Gillet; Orbilia rubella var. rufula (Schwein.) Sacc.; Peziza rufula Schwein.; Pezizella rufula (Schwein.) Sacc.; Orbilia alnea var. vesiculosa Velen.; Orbilia botulispora Höhn.; Orbilia hypothallosa Velen.; Orbilia microspora Velen.; Orbilia millispora Velen.; Orbilia paradoxa Ade; Peziza xanthostigma W. Phillips

Species of fungus

Orbilia xanthostigma is a species of wood decaying, carnivorous fungi, residing in the family Orbiliaceae, in the genus Orbilia. The name is derived from Greek. The common English name of this fungus is the glasscup.

Morphological taxonomy of the genus Orbilia places this species in closes relation to O. leucostigma; these two species create a species complex. Their morphology and overall functions are the same, only differing in the coloration of the fruiting body.

== Taxonomy ==
Orbilia xanthostigma was described by a Swedish mycologist, Elias Magnus Fries, in 1815, and was later renamed by Fries in 1849. It was first described in Scandinavia and published in his work Summa vegitabilum Scandinaviae, a botanical work written in Latin.

== Morphology ==
Orbilia xanthostigma is a tiny disk/saucer shaped fungus, ranging in size from 0.3 to 1 mm (0.012 to 0.039 in). The fruiting body does not possess a pileus, stipe, ring, or vulva. The hymenium is cup shaped, smooth, and waxy. It sits flat on the surface and does not have a stalk. The apothecial coloration is described as golden yellow to orange yellow. When dry, the fruiting bodies may appear wavy or lobed, and irregularly shaped. It possesses a significant curve, and typically possesses one round and obtuse edge, with the other being smaller and smoother. It typically grows in high numbers, in close proximity to one another. It typically appears in largely dense groups called gregarious clusters and is commonly found on fallen hardwood in moist or shaded woodlands. The disc fungus is a wood decomposer saprotroph. Mostly, the species is located in temporal regions and is present on rotting wood or tree stumps; found on various kinds of wood, including broadleaf and coniferous trees, particularly oak and pine, from the spring to the fall seasons.

The members of this group can also be classified through their spores: cashew shaped and warted ascospores that range from about 2.5-3 micrometers in length with a curvature of about 120-180 degrees. They appear in ascus sacks, typically 8 at a time. The species also has dicranidion-like conidia, a form of asexual spore. These are distinctive spores, developed primarily for the purpose of easier dispersal and spore transport by vectors where anchoring or aquatic adaptations are necessary. Asci are characteristically trunicate at the apex, the base is prolonged in an L shape. The paraphyses are inflated at the apex.

Members of the family Orbiliaceae are typically characterized through the production of light colored and partially translucent apothecia. They also contain small asci and ascospores with KOH soluble spore bodies.

== Predation ==
The class Orbiliomycetes is a large class of fungi within the phylum of Ascomycota; it contains free living, nematophagous, soil fungi that are known for their ability to trap and consume nematodes, as well as other small organisms. They do so through the usage of several trapping mechanisms. Within the members of Orbiliacaea, these mechanisms include adhesive sticky knobs, adhesive networks, constrictor rings, nonconstrictor rings, and sticky adhesive branches.

Fungi can live saprophytically on wood, and as predators, capturing nematodes. The presence of nematode traps indicates a switch from a saprophytic to predacious feeding system.

The fungi within the genus Orbilia are carnivorous; however, most only supplement their diet through the consumption of nematodes. A standing hypothesis claims the species within this genus use nematodes as the primary supply of nitrogen, and in fact are weak wood decomposers. During periods of nutritional starvation or in the presence of nematodes, nematode trapping fungi switch towards predation and produce nematode trapping mechanisms.

These organisms play a crucial role in soil dynamics, regulating nematode populations in the ecosystems. Nematode trapping fungi serve as a wonderful model system, and stand indicative of fungal evolution, as well as the evolution of organismal interactions between fungi and nematodes. Similarly, this relationship is also indicative of nematode evolution, representing a marker that promoted nematode fitness against predation and other factors alongside it.

== Phylogeny ==
Orbilia xanthostigma and O. leucostigma present in clusters.

Orbilia xanthostigma is a species within the family Orbiliaceae, which contains more than 200 species in 12 genera. O. xanthostigma represents the most commonly recorded species of Orbiliomycetes.

Molecular and genetic analysis of nematode trapping fungi indicates that the monophyletic classes of Orbiliomycetes and Pezizomycetes are two of the earliest branches to diverge from Pezizomycotina. Certain genera are well known nematode trapping fungi. Evidence suggests this ability evolved only once in Orbiliales.

O. xanthostigma is closely related to Orbilia leucostigma; this is a cryptic speciation aggregate and is typically referred to as the Orbilia xanthostigma-leucostigma complex. Besides the difference in apothecial color (yellow to orange in O. xanthostigma and white to pale rose in O. leucostigma), there are no other notable morphological differences between the two species. This applies to both the telemorph, which includes the asci, ascospores, and paraphyses (sexual reproductive structures), as well as the anamorphic, which includes the conidia and conidiophores (asexual reproductive structures). While these two names have been used synonymously, they do in fact compose two separate species.

The Orbilia xanthostigma-leucostigma complex include organisms that have been grouped together due to the sexual and asexual morphologies of the ascocarp. They were previously considered two color variants of the same species and were not differentiated between. Both O. xanthostigma and O. leucostigma grow gregarious clusters on hygric gymno- and angiosperm wood or rarely bark and show a worldwide distribution. However, a study concluded that, in fact, this species complex consists of two distinct species.

The method of internal transcriber spaces (ITS) and large subunit gene of rDNA (LSU) regions are the two primary ways for phylogenetic studies within fungi. A lot of genetic diversity can be found within the Orbilia xanthostigma-leutostigma complex. When examining samples across Europe and Macaronesia, Baral and colleagues found three separate genotypes, of which the length of ITS and intron consistency and significantly differed. They named the three genotypes O. xanthostigma, O. cf. xanthostigma, and O. leucostigma. In an analysis of the ITS regions, the O. xanthostigma-leucostigma complex formed two subclades which were strongly supported by the data. The results support the conclusion that there exist two genetically distinct species.

== Ecological importance ==
Orbilia xanthostigma is a heterotroph. It cannot manufacture its own food like plants, therefore it must obtain it from somewhere in the environment, relying on carbon from other organisms for its own metabolism. Fungi do this by growing through the substrate they are feeding on. This saprotroph obtains its nutrients by decomposing dead organic matter, such as fallen trees, twigs, stumps, and other lignin based matter. They do so through the secretion of enzymes, absorbing the dissolved material. It also performs carnivorous behavior, through predation on nematodes.

This organism serves an important role within forest ecosystems. By decomposing fallen trees, they clear up the space for new growth and allow the cycling of nutrients to occur. Releasing these nutrients back into the environment through consumption, O. xanthostigma propels the carbon cycle.

This organism serves no economical importance to humans. While it is a wood decayed, cycling the nutrients through the ecological system.
