= Arthrobotrys elegans =

Scientific classification
- Domain: Eukaryota
- Kingdom: Fungi
- Division: Ascomycota
- Class: Orbiliomycetes
- Order: Orbiliales
- Family: Orbiliaceae
- Genus: Arthrobotrys
- Species: A. elegans

Binomial name
- Arthrobotrys elegans (Subram. & Chandrash.) Seifert & W.B. Kendr. 1983

Synonyms
- Candelabrella elegans (Subramanian & Chandrashekara 1979

Species of fungus

Arthrobotrys elegans is a species of mitosporic fungi in the family Orbiliaceae. It is found on dung.
