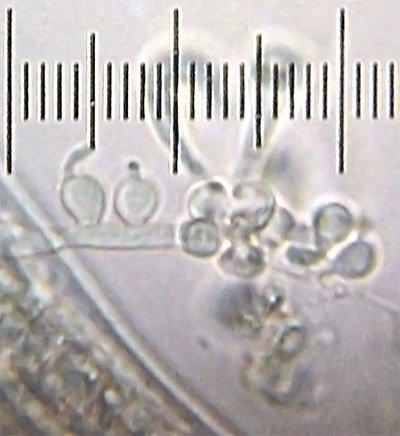

Scientific classification
- Kingdom: Fungi
- Division: Ascomycota
- Class: Sordariomycetes
- Order: Hypocreales
- Family: Clavicipitaceae
- Genus: Harposporium
- Species: H. anguillulae

Binomial name
- Harposporium anguillulae Lohde emend. Zopf

= Harposporium anguillulae =

Species of fungus

Harposporium anguillulae is a member of the genus Harposporium. It is an endoparasitic nematophagous fungus that attacks nematodes and eelworms and is isolated commonly from field and agricultural soils as well as used as an experimental organism in the laboratory.

== History and taxonomy ==
Harposporium anguillulae was described in the late 1800s as a parasite of nematodes. It has since been commonly reported in the literature. This fungus also traps eelworms. Harposporium anguillulae is one of 26 species in the genus Harposporium in the division Ascomycota. It is a pathogen of eelworms and nematodes, notable for its distinct sickle-shaped conidia that grow in pierce out through the host body. This genus Harposporium was treated initially in the Clavicipitaceae and is thought to be closely related to members of the genus, Tolypocladium. Both genera occur on nematodes and eelworms but rarely insects. The two genera can be differentiated morphologically, as members of the genus Tolypocladium produce more complex conidiophores with narrower conidiogenous cells.

== Growth and physiology ==
The invasive apparatus of this species consists of non-adhesive, crescent-shaped conidia that are ingested by hosts and lodge in the esophagus or gut. The sickle shape of the conidia is also contributes to the ability of the fungus to pierce through the host cuticle. In the laboratory, cultures of the fungus can be cultivated on agar containing yeast hydrolysate or glucose, though growth is much slower on glucose. The fungus grows rapidly on water-agar and produces chlamydospores, implying an oligotrophic physiology.

== Habitat and ecology ==
Nematophagous fungi occur in a variety of habitats including leaves entering the decomposition phase, soil samples that contain decomposed leaves or in soil samples from agricultural land and they can also be found in pasture land. The latter possibly relates to the tendency of this species to occur in dung of cow and sheep where its nematode hosts are abundant. The fungus is commonly found in tropical and warm climates. It is more commonly encountered in the spring and fall. The fungus has been isolated from include Brazil, China, Florida, New Zealand, and eastern Canada. The fungus tends to be more commonly reported from climate regions subject to monsoons and does not appear to survive cold weather well, though the predilection of this species for warm damp climates may relate more to the distributions of its hosts.

The fungus is known primarily as a parasite of nematodes and eelworms. During its life cycle, conidia of the fungus are ingested by eelworms or nematodes and lodge in the pharynx or gut. Once inside the host, the conidia germinate and begin to colonize the host digestive tract. During the initial phases of this process, the host remains alive, but as the fungus spreads from the gut to the surrounding tissues in the latter stages of infection and the death of the host soon follows. Conidial production occurs on nematode cadavers by the eruption of conidiophores and conidia through the host cuticle.

== Biological control of nematodes ==
This fungus has been investigated as a biocontrol agent of agriculturally important nematodes, most notably those responsible for gastrointestinal infection of grazing animals. These parasitic infections are commonly treated with anthelmintic agents including benimidazole, levamisole and invermectin. However, increasing levels of anthelmintic resistance have been observed, driving the search for new treatment and prevention options. Larvae of animal-pathogenic nematodes are found in soil. The prospect of treating contaminated soils with nematode pathogenic fungi such as H. anguillulae has shown potential to reduce nematode populations. However, the fungus does not persist in soil following the elimination of nematode populations, potentially limiting its use as a sustainable biocontrol agent.
