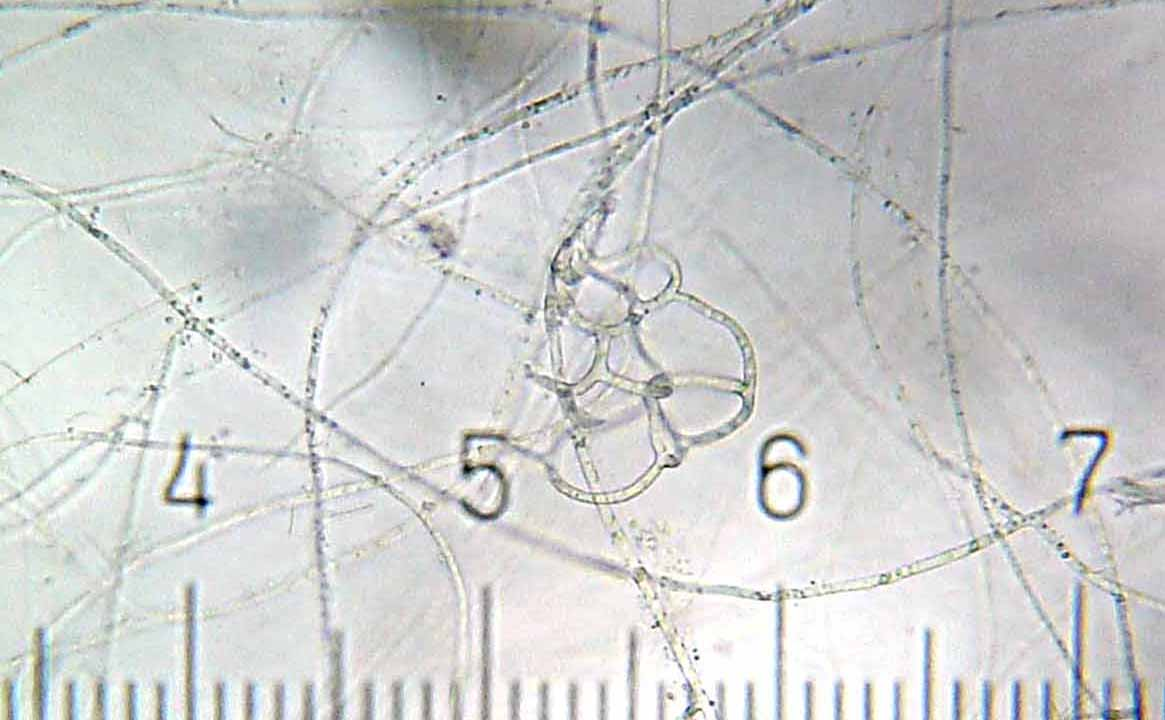

Scientific classification
- Kingdom: Fungi
- Division: Ascomycota
- Class: Orbiliomycetes
- Order: Orbiliales
- Family: Orbiliaceae
- Genus: Arthrobotrys
- Species: A. oligospora

Binomial name
- Arthrobotrys oligospora Fresen. (1850)

Synonyms
- Orbilia auricolor (A. Bloxam) Sacc. (1889); Arthrobotrys superba var. oligospora (Fresen.) Coemans (1863); Didymozoophaga oligospora (Fresen.) Soprunov & Galiulina (1951)

= Arthrobotrys oligospora =

Species of fungus

Arthrobotrys oligospora was discovered in Europe in 1850 by Georg Fresenius. A. oligospora is the model organism for interactions between fungi and nematodes. It is the most common nematode-capturing fungus, and most widespread nematode-trapping fungus in nature. It was the first species of fungi documented to actively capture nematodes.

== Growth and morphology ==
This fungus reproduces by means of two-celled, pear-shaped conidia, in which the cells are of unequal size with the smaller cell nearer to the attachment point on the conidiophore. During germination, the germ tube typically erupts from the smaller cell. In environments rich with nematodes, the spores range from 22-32 by 12-20 μm, though the spores are smaller in environments devoid of nematodes. Conidium germination has a success rate of 100% but the formation of trapping organs are not always observed. Conidia have been found to disintegrate both in the air and on impact with an agar plate. Conidiophores and conidia grow from hyphae sprouted outside of a trapped dead nematode, and conidiophores have been found to change and grow into part of the adhesive net. Under ideal conditions, a colony can reach 65 mm in diameter after seven days incubation, with colourless, pale pink or yellow mycelium. The optimal growth temperature for the fungus in nematode-free and nematode-infested environments is 20 °C (68 °F) and 25 °C (77 °F), respectively. The growth rate of colonies is greater in the presence of light than in darkness.

== Physiology ==
Arthrobotrys oligospora is considered a saprobe and is more saprotrophic than other nematode capturing fungi. At first the fungus was considered largely saprophytic in nature but this interpretation was later questioned. Saprophytic growth uses D-xylose, D-mannose, and cellobiose. The fungus uses nitrite, nitrate, and ammonium for its nitrogen sources and uses pectin, cellulose, and chitin for its carbon sources. When predating on nematodes, the fungus uses cellobiose, L-asparagine, L-arginine, DL glutamic acid for its carbon and nitrogen sources.

=== Nematode capturing ===
Predation of nematodes occurs in low nitrogen environments, as the nematode becomes the main nitrogen source for the fungi. It has been found that the presence of ammonium causes a higher decrease of predation when compared to presence of nitrate or nitrite. Adding green manure or carbohydrates has been found to increase nematode trapping behaviors. A complex 3-dimensional net of hyphae is formed to trap the nematodes under conditions of pH 4.9-8.1 and a temperature less than 37 °C (99 °F). Nematodes, and specifically "nemin" (an extract derived from nematodes) were found to stimulate net formation. Nematodes are not as attracted to A. oligospora colonies that have not manifested traps, suggesting that these structures serve an additional attractant role possibly through the expression of pheromones. It is possible some of these pheromones, such as methyl 3-methyl-2-butenoate, evolved as olfactory mimicry. They may mimic and interfere with sex pheromones of some nematode species (in the above case, the pheromone interferes with Caenorhabditis elegans).

A full net is not needed to catch nematodes as smaller nematodes can be caught with a single loop. Lectins are used in attaching nematode to fungi The entire surface of net is covered in adhesive material. Strong adhesion keeps the nematode trapped and when the nematode struggles, it often results in multiple points of adhesion of the nematode to the net. It was even found that the adhesion of the nematode to the fungus remained under washing of agar plate with water. The net is flexible which results in 'hyphal drag' tiring the nematode. Multiple points of adhesion and 'hyphal drag' allow the net to be capable of catching both large and small nematodes easily. In vitro, bait nematodes are consumed often leaving Bunonema nematodes.

A substance found in paralyzed nematodes was found to be capable of paralyzing healthy nematodes, and it was later determined that a paralyzing substance, Subtilisin (A serine protease), is excreted into nematodes. An unstable toxin was thought to be made by the fungus, and it was later found that toxic levels of linoleic acid for nematodes (lethal dose of linoleic acid for C. elegans is 5–10 μg/ml) were found in the fungus. Enzymatic hyphal invasion, likely using collagenases which are found in 'Arthrobotrys', of a trapped nematode is followed by the digestion of contents of the nematode. Shortly after hyphal invasion, a hyphal bulb appears where hyphae grow outwards from the bulb along the entire body of the nematode.

Not all nematodes are caught by the net as the nematode needs to be in contact with the net for a short period of time in order for adhesion to occur. Nematodes were found to quickly move away from any net followed by curling if instantaneous contact occurs. The nematode then proceeds to move forward until out of the area of the net and unless prolonged contact is made the nematode is safe. This means one or several instantaneous contacts are not enough for adhesion between the nematode and net to occur.

No competing fungi or bacteria are found in nematodes which are being consumed by the fungus which means it is possible an antibiotic is released inside the nematode. In 1993, secondary metabolites (oligosporon, oligosporol A, and oligosporal B) which can act as antibiotics were found in the fungus. Oligosporon, oligosporol A, oligosporal B have hemolytic effects and are cytotoxic to nematodes, however they are not toxic to the C. elegans. Other oligosporon-type secondary metabolites also found in A. oligospora include (4S,5R,6R)-4′,5′- dihydrooligosporon, (4S,5R,6R)-hydroxyoligosporon, and (4S,5R,6R)-10′11 ′-epoxyoligosporon.

==== Net formation ====
A branch of hyphae grows out of a vegetative hyphae eventually arching back to the parent hyphae and fuses with it to make a loop. This process repeats from any hyphae along any existing branches or a new parent hyphae. The nets are immediately adhesive, and hyphae in the loop have different organelles to trap nematodes which are not found in vegetative cells.

== Habitat and ecology ==
Arthrobotrys oligospora has been found in many different geographical regions which include Asia, Africa, North America and South America and Australasia. Some countries it has been found in include Turkmenistan, Azerbaijan, Poland, Canada, New Zealand, and India. The presence of insects infected by nematodes increased presence of A. oligospora but not other nematode capturing fungi.

The fungus can be found in soil in grassland, shrubland, plantations, sheep and cattle yards, and domesticated and non-domesticated animal feces. It colonizes forest steppe soil, mixed forest soil, and Mediterranean brown soil (pH 6.9-8.0) where the pH can be as low as 4.5, but is typically above 5.5. The fungus has also been found in aquatic environments, and heavily polluted areas, specifically heavy metal poisoned mines, fungicide, or nematicide infested soil, decayed plant material, leaves, roots, moss, and in the rhizosphere of various bean plants, barley, and the tomato plant. Larger populations of the fungus can be found in late spring and summer.

== Industrial uses ==
The fungus is a biological indicator of nematodes. The annual global cost of plant-parasitic nematodes is approximately 100 billion USD. Nematode capturing fungi such as the A. oligospora can be used to control growth of nematodes. This means that they can be potentially used as a bio-control agent to protect crops against nematode infestations. This may not be feasible since the nematodes occasionally eat the fungi.
