= Duddingtonia =

Scientific classification
- Kingdom: Fungi
- Division: Ascomycota
- Class: Orbiliomycetes
- Order: Orbiliales
- Family: Orbiliaceae
- Genus: Duddingtonia; R.C. Cooke
- Species: D. flagrans

Binomial name
- Duddingtonia flagrans (Dudd.) R.C. Cooke 1969

Genus of fungi

Duddingtonia is a genus of fungi in the family Orbiliaceae comprising only the species Duddingtonia flagrans.

== Synonymy ==
The species Duddingtonia flagrans has 2 synonymous names:

- Arthrobotrys flagrans (Dudd.) Sidorova, Gorlenko & Nalepina
- Trichothecium flagrans Dudd.
