= Dactylellina =

Scientific classification
- Kingdom: Fungi
- Division: Ascomycota
- Class: Orbiliomycetes
- Order: Orbiliales
- Family: Orbiliaceae
- Genus: Dactylellina

Species
- See text

Genus of fungi

Dactylellina is a genus mitosporic fungi in the family Orbiliaceae. There are 16 species.

== Species ==
- Dactylellina arcuata (Scheuer & J. Webster) Ying Yang & Xing Z. Liu 2006
- Dactylellina candida (Nees) Yan Li 2005
- Dactylellina candidum (Nees) Yan Li 2006
- Dactylellina cionopaga (Drechsler) Ying Yang & Xing Z. Liu 2006
- Dactylellina daliensis H.Y. Su 2008
- Dactylellina ferox (Onofri & S. Tosi) M. Scholler, Hagedorn & A. Rubner 1999
- Dactylellina formosana (J.Y. Liou, G.Y. Liou & Tzean) M. Scholler, Hagedorn & A. Rubner 1999
- Dactylellina haptospora (Drechsler) M. Scholler, Hagedorn & A. Rubner 1999
- Dactylellina haptotyla (Drechsler) M. Scholler, Hagedorn & A. Rubner 1999
- Dactylellina hertziana (M. Scholler & A. Rubner) M. Scholler, Hagedorn & A. Rubner 1999
- Dactylellina huisuniana (J.L. Chen, T.L. Huang & Tzean) M. Scholler, Hagedorn & A. Rubner 1999
- Dactylellina illaqueata D.S. Yang & M.H. Mo 2006
- Dactylellina parvicolle (Drechsler) Yan Li 2006
- Dactylellina quercus Bin Liu, Xing Z. Liu & W.Y. Zhuang 2005
- Dactylellina sichuanensis Yan Li, K.D. Hyde & K.Q. Zhang 2006
- Dactylellina varietas Yan Li, K.D. Hyde & K.Q. Zhang 2006
