= Butternut, Wisconsin =

- Village
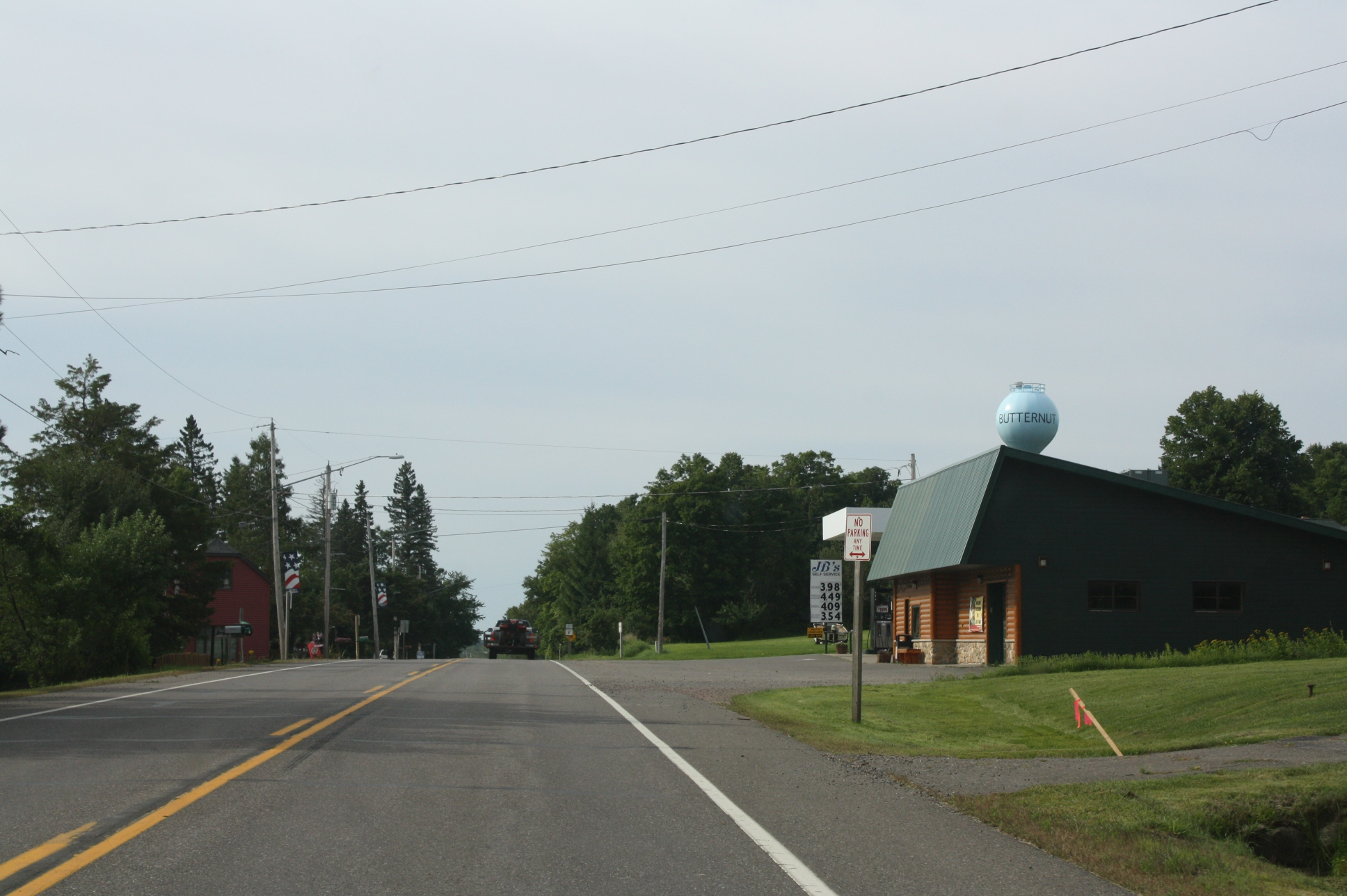
- Looking south in Butternut

- Location of Butternut in Ashland County, Wisconsin
- Coordinates: 46°0′50″N 90°29′41″W
- Country: United States
- State: Wisconsin
- County: Ashland

Area
  - Total: 1.47 sq mi (3.81 km^{2})
  - Land: 1.47 sq mi (3.81 km^{2})
  - Water: 0 sq mi (0.00 km^{2})
- Elevation: 1,496 ft (456 m)

Population (2020)
  - Total: 366
  - Density: 249/sq mi (96.1/km^{2})
- Time zone: UTC-6 (Central (CST))
  - Summer (DST): UTC-5 (CDT)
- ZIP code: 54514
- Area codes: 715 & 534
- FIPS code: 55-11525
- GNIS feature ID: 1562478
- Public Transit: Bay Area Rural Transit
- Website: www.butternutwi.com

Butternut is a village in Ashland County in the U.S. state of Wisconsin. The population was 366 at the 2020 census.

== Geography ==
Butternut is located at 46°0′50″N 90°29′41″W (46.013958, -90.494614).

According to the United States Census Bureau, the village has a total area of 1.61 square miles (4.17 km^{2}), all land.

=== Climate ===
Climate data for Butternut 3SW, Wisconsin, 1991–2020 normals: 1570ft (479m)
Month	Jan	Feb	Mar	Apr	May	Jun	Jul	Aug	Sep	Oct	Nov	Dec	Year
Record high °F (°C)	51 (11)	57 (14)	76 (24)	84 (29)	90 (32)	94 (34)	97 (36)	96 (36)	91 (33)	82 (28)	71 (22)	58 (14)	97 (36)
Mean maximum °F (°C)	39.4 (4.1)	44.3 (6.8)	58.4 (14.7)	74.5 (23.6)	81.4 (27.4)	87.5 (30.8)	88.5 (31.4)	87.4 (30.8)	83.5 (28.6)	74.3 (23.5)	57.4 (14.1)	43.6 (6.4)	87.8 (31.0)
Mean daily maximum °F (°C)	19.6 (−6.9)	24.3 (−4.3)	36.8 (2.7)	49.7 (9.8)	64.0 (17.8)	73.5 (23.1)	77.7 (25.4)	75.9 (24.4)	67.8 (19.9)	53.2 (11.8)	36.9 (2.7)	24.8 (−4.0)	50.3 (10.2)
Daily mean °F (°C)	10.4 (−12.0)	13.6 (−10.2)	25.4 (−3.7)	38.6 (3.7)	52.0 (11.1)	61.7 (16.5)	65.8 (18.8)	63.8 (17.7)	56.0 (13.3)	43.2 (6.2)	29.4 (−1.4)	17.1 (−8.3)	39.8 (4.3)
Mean daily minimum °F (°C)	1.1 (−17.2)	2.9 (−16.2)	14.0 (−10.0)	27.5 (−2.5)	39.9 (4.4)	49.9 (9.9)	53.8 (12.1)	51.7 (10.9)	44.3 (6.8)	33.2 (0.7)	21.8 (−5.7)	9.5 (−12.5)	29.1 (−1.6)
Mean minimum °F (°C)	−24.7 (−31.5)	−22.4 (−30.2)	−12.4 (−24.7)	12.4 (−10.9)	25.2 (−3.8)	34.8 (1.6)	41.6 (5.3)	39.6 (4.2)	28.3 (−2.1)	18.8 (−7.3)	2.0 (−16.7)	−16.8 (−27.1)	−28.3 (−33.5)
Record low °F (°C)	−47 (−44)	−49 (−45)	−29 (−34)	−6 (−21)	19 (−7)	26 (−3)	33 (1)	33 (1)	22 (−6)	6 (−14)	−16 (−27)	−33 (−36)	−49 (−45)
Average precipitation inches (mm)	1.16 (29)	1.38 (35)	1.96 (50)	3.02 (77)	3.87 (98)	4.98 (126)	4.26 (108)	3.71 (94)	3.83 (97)	3.98 (101)	2.06 (52)	1.80 (46)	36.01 (913)
Average snowfall inches (cm)	13.3 (34)	15.2 (39)	11.3 (29)	7.5 (19)	0.8 (2.0)	0.0 (0.0)	0.0 (0.0)	0.0 (0.0)	trace	2.5 (6.4)	8.6 (22)	15.0 (38)	74.2 (189.4)
Source 1: NOAA
Source 2: XMACIS (1998-2020 snowfall, temp records & monthly max/mins)

== Demographics ==
Historical population
Census	Pop.	Note	%±
1910	717		—
1920	618		−13.8%
1930	604		−2.3%
1940	669		10.8%
1950	522		−22.0%
1960	499		−4.4%
1970	453		−9.2%
1980	438		−3.3%
1990	416		−5.0%
2000	407		−2.2%
2010	375		−7.9%
2020	366		−2.4%
U.S. Decennial Census

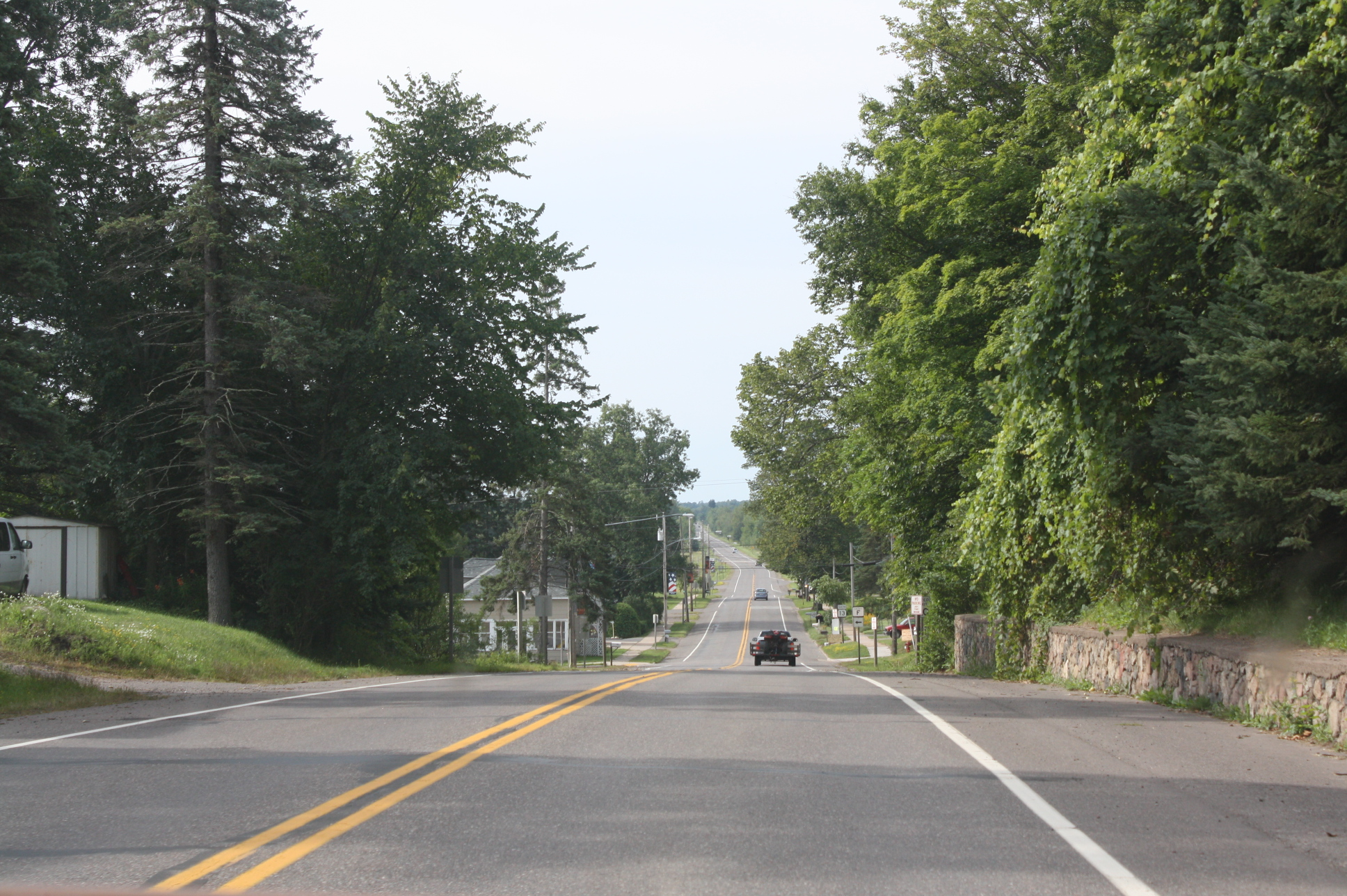
Looking south in Butternut

=== 2010 census ===
As of the census of 2010, there were 375 people, 180 households, and 103 families living in the village. The population density was 232.9 inhabitants per square mile (89.9/km^{2}). There were 214 housing units at an average density of 132.9 per square mile (51.3/km^{2}). The racial makeup of the village was 94.1% White, 2.7% Native American, 0.3% from other races, and 2.9% from two or more races. Hispanic or Latino people of any race were 1.1% of the population.

There were 180 households, of which 28.9% had children under the age of 18 living with them, 37.2% were married couples living together, 13.3% had a female householder with no husband present, 6.7% had a male householder with no wife present, and 42.8% were non-families. 38.9% of all households were made up of individuals, and 17.8% had someone living alone who was 65 years of age or older. The average household size was 2.08 and the average family size was 2.72.

The median age in the village was 41.5 years. 22.9% of residents were under the age of 18; 7.6% were between the ages of 18 and 24; 25.8% were from 25 to 44; 27% were from 45 to 64; and 16.8% were 65 years of age or older. The gender makeup of the village was 50.1% male and 49.9% female.

=== 2000 census ===
As of the census of 2000, there were 407 people, 197 households, and 102 families living in the village. The population density was 254.2 people per square mile (98.2/km^{2}). There were 220 housing units at an average density of 137.4 per square mile (53.1/km^{2}). The racial makeup of the village was 98.28% White and 1.72% Native American. Hispanic or Latino people of any race were 0.25% of the population.

There were 197 households, out of which 25.9% had children under the age of 18 living with them, 40.1% were married couples living together, 7.6% had a female householder with no husband present, and 48.2% were non-families. 43.7% of all households were made up of individuals, and 24.9% had someone living alone who was 65 years of age or older. The average household size was 2.07 and the average family size was 2.93.

In the village, the population was spread out, with 24.1% under the age of 18, 8.4% from 18 to 24, 27.5% from 25 to 44, 19.4% from 45 to 64, and 20.6% who were 65 years of age or older. The median age was 37 years. For every 100 females, there were 92.9 males. For every 100 females age 18 and over, there were 83.9 males.

The median income for a household in the village was $30,446, and the median income for a family was $43,125. Males had a median income of $31,979 versus $17,000 for females. The per capita income for the village was $16,002. About 1.9% of families and 7.0% of the population were below the poverty line, including 6.5% of those under age 18 and 16.3% of those age 65 or over.

== Education ==
The Butternut School District serves the area.

== Transportation ==
Bus service to the community is provided by Bay Area Rural Transit.

== Notable people ==
- Charles Drechsler, mycologist; born on a farm near Butternut
- Carl L. Klein, Illinois state representative
