= Pseudorbilia =

Scientific classification
- Kingdom: Fungi
- Division: Ascomycota
- Class: Orbiliomycetes
- Order: Orbiliales
- Family: Orbiliaceae
- Genus: Pseudorbilia

Species
- Pseudorbilia bipolaris Y. Zhang bis,, Z.F. Yu, Baral & K.Q. Zhang 2007

Single-species genus of fungi

Pseudorbilia is a genus of fungi in the family Orbiliaceae consisting only of the species Pseudorbilia bipolaris.
