= Brachyphoris =

Scientific classification
- Kingdom: Fungi
- Division: Ascomycota
- Class: Orbiliomycetes
- Order: Orbiliales
- Family: Orbiliaceae
- Genus: Brachyphoris

Species
- See text

Genus of fungi

Brachyphoris is a genus comprising five species of mitosporic fungi in the family Orbiliaceae.

== Species ==
- Brachyphoris brevistipitata (B. Liu, Xing Z. Liu & W.Y. Zhuang) Juan Chen, L.L. Xu, B. Liu & Xing Z. Liu 2007
- Brachyphoris helminthodes (Drechsler) Juan Chen, L.L. Xu, B. Liu & Xing Z. Liu 2007
- Brachyphoris oviparasitica (G.R. Stirling & Mankau) Juan Chen, L.L. Xu, B. Liu & Xing Z. Liu 2007
- Brachyphoris stenomeces (Drechsler) Juan Chen, L.L. Xu, B. Liu & Xing Z. Liu 2007
- Brachyphoris tenuifusaria (Xing Z. Liu, R.H. Gao, K.Q. Zhang & L. Cao) Juan Chen, L.L. Xu, B. Liu & Xing Z. Liu 2007
