= Carl L. Klein =

American politician

Member of the Illinois House of Representatives

Personal details
- Born: Butternut, Wisconsin
- Party: Republican

Carl L. Klein was an American politician who served as a member of the Illinois House of Representatives.
