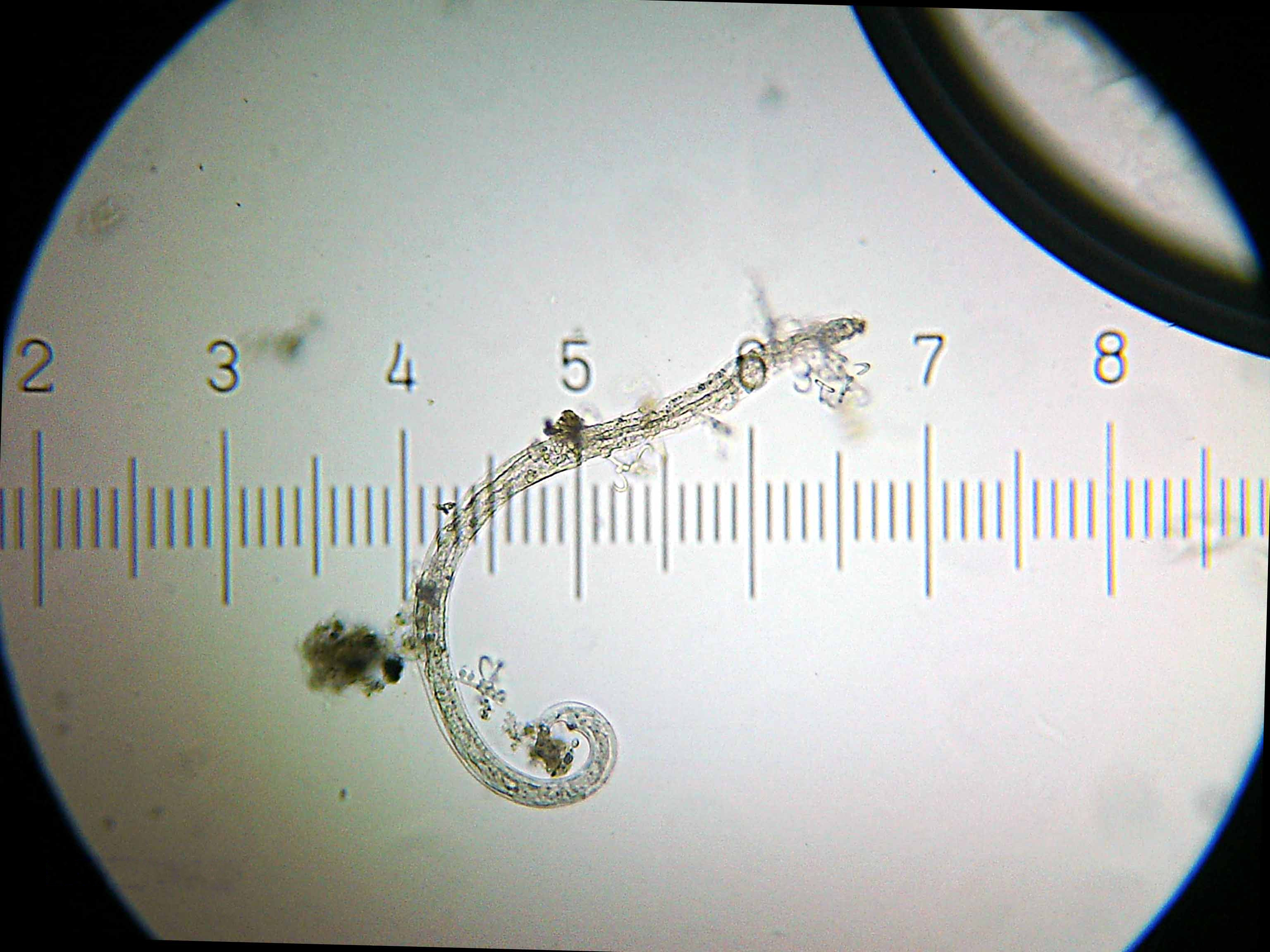
- Harposporium anguillulae on a dead nematode

Scientific classification
- Kingdom: Fungi
- Division: Ascomycota
- Class: Sordariomycetes
- Order: Hypocreales
- Family: Clavicipitaceae
- Genus: Harposporium; Lohde

Species
- See text

Synonyms
- Atricordyceps Samuels (1983); Podocrella Seaver (1928); Polyrhina Sorokīn (1876); Wakefieldiomyces Kobayasi (1981)

= Harposporium =

Genus of fungi

Harposporium is a genus of anamorphic fungi within the family Clavicipitaceae.

== Species ==
- Harposporium anguillulae
- Harposporium angulare
- Harposporium angustisporum
- Harposporium arcuatum
- Harposporium arthrosporum
- Harposporium baculiforme
- Harposporium botuliforme
- Harposporium bredonense
- Harposporium bysmatosporum
- Harposporium cerberi
- Harposporium cocleatum
- Harposporium crassum
- Harposporium cycloides
- Harposporium cylindrosporum
- Harposporium diceraeum
- Harposporium dicorymbum
- Harposporium drechsleri
- Harposporium helicoides
- Harposporium janus
- Harposporium leptospira
- Harposporium lilliputanum
- Harposporium microsporale
- Harposporium microsporum
- Harposporium multiformis
- Harposporium oxycoracum
- Harposporium reniforme
- Harposporium rhynchosporum
- Harposporium sicyodes
- Harposporium sinense
- Harposporium spirosporum
- Harposporium subuliforme
- Harposporium thaumasium
- Harposporium trigonosporum
