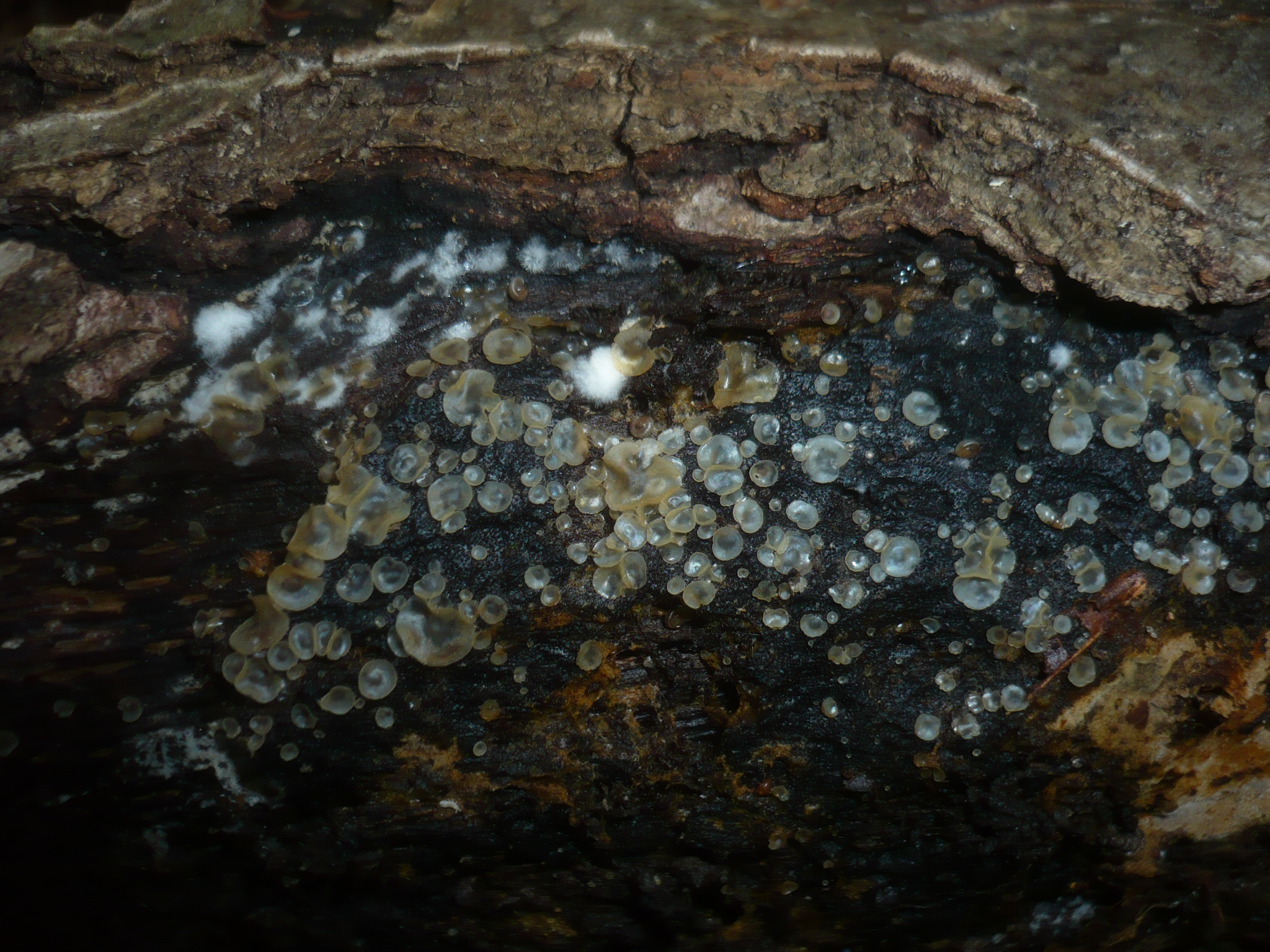
- Hyalorbilia inflatula

Scientific classification
- Kingdom: Fungi
- Division: Ascomycota
- Class: Orbiliomycetes
- Order: Orbiliales
- Family: Orbiliaceae
- Genus: Hyalorbilia; Baral & G.Marson (2000)

Type species
- Hyalorbilia berberidis (Velen.) Baral (2000)

Species
- See text

= Hyalorbilia =

Genus of fungi

Hyalorbilia is a genus comprising 10 species of fungi in the family Orbiliaceae. The genus was circumscribed in 2000.

== Species ==
- Hyalorbilia arcuata Baral, M.L.Wu & Y.C.Su 2007
- Hyalorbilia berberidis (Velen.) Baral 2000
- Hyalorbilia biguttulata Baral, M.L.Wu & Y.C.Su 2007
- Hyalorbilia brevistipitata B.Liu, Xing Z.Liu & W.Y.Zhuang 2005
- Hyalorbilia erythrostigma (W.Phillips) Baral & G.Marson 2000
- Hyalorbilia fusispora (Velen.) Baral & G.Marson 2000
- Hyalorbilia inflatula (P.Karst.) Baral & G. Marson 2000
- Hyalorbilia juliae (Velen.) Baral, Priou & G.Marson 2005
- Hyalorbilia lunata (Korf) Baral 2000
