= Arthrobotrys dactyloides =

Scientific classification
- Domain: Eukaryota
- Kingdom: Fungi
- Division: Ascomycota
- Class: Orbiliomycetes
- Order: Orbiliales
- Family: Orbiliaceae
- Genus: Arthrobotrys
- Species: A. dactyloides

Binomial name
- Arthrobotrys dactyloides Drechsler, 1937

Synonyms
- Arthrobotrys anchonia Drechsler, 1954; Dactylaria dactyloides (Drechsler) Soprunov, 1958; Dactylariopsis dactyloides (Drechsler) Mekht., 1979; Drechslerella anchonia (Drechsler) M. Scholler, Hagedorn & A. Rubner, 1999; Drechslerella dactyloides (Drechsler) M. Scholler, Hagedorn & A. Rubner, 1999; Nematophagus anchonius (Drechsler) Mekht., 1979

Species of fungus

Arthrobotrys dactyloides is a species of fungus in the family Orbiliaceae. It is nematophagous, forming loops of hypha to trap nematodes, on which it then feeds.

== Description ==
The species has a whitish spreading mycelium of branched, hyaline hyphae (thread-like filaments) some 2 to 4 μm wide. The conidia (non-motile spores) are borne on specialized stalks called conidiophores which are hyaline, erect and 200 to 550 μm long. These taper upwards and expand into a knob-like tip which is a distinguishing feature of this species. The conidia are hyaline, tapering towards the base and 20 to 52 μm long.

== Biology ==
Arthrobotrys dactyloides has the ability to form rings of hypha that can constrict sharply and catch a nematode in the loop. Each ring is a short branch of the hypha containing three cells, separated by three "T-shaped" areas of cell wall. When stimulated by the movement of a nematode inside the loop (or by heat, or by the tip of a researcher's needle), the three cells inflate suddenly, rather like balloons, and the nematode is trapped in a vice-like grip, its body constricted into two parts. Now branches of hypha invade the nematode on either side of the loop and digest and absorb the soft tissues. Within a few hours the nutrients from these are available to the mycelium of the fungus. Unlike some other species of nematophagous fungi which create sticky nets, A. dactyloides is able to form constricting ring-traps immediately after emerging from the conidia. These are known as conidial traps and may constitute a survival mechanism under adverse conditions. Under normal conditions, a hypha is formed on germination of the conidia; this grows and branches to form a mycelium, and loop traps form on the hyphae in the mycelium.

== Uses ==
The fungus is being researched for use in biological control of root-knot nematodes. Compared to other nematophagous fungi it is rather slow growing. A. dactyloides has been mass-reared in liquid culture but because it is sensitive to desiccation, it has not been possible to use fast drying procedures. However, this problem has been overcome and it can now be formulated as granules which can be sprinkled on the soil close to plants. In greenhouse experiments it proved up to 96% effective at reducing root-knot nematodes.
