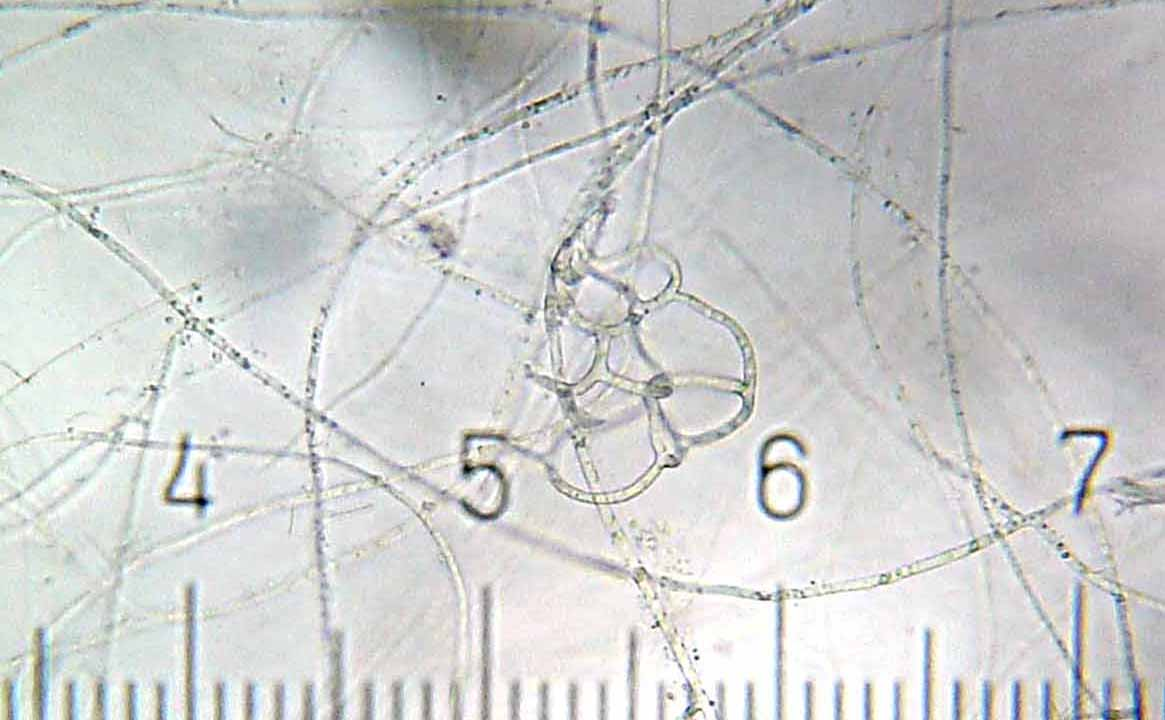
- Arthrobotrys sp.

Scientific classification
- Kingdom: Fungi
- Division: Ascomycota
- Class: Orbiliomycetes
- Order: Orbiliales
- Family: Orbiliaceae
- Genus: Arthrobotrys; Corda, 1839

Species
- See text

= Arthrobotrys =

Genus of fungi

Arthrobotrys is a genus of mitosporic fungi in the family Orbiliaceae. They are predatory fungi that capture and feed on nematode worms.

== Predetory Mechanisms ==
Arthrobotrys are known to form rings with their hyphae to constrict and entrap nematodes, which then grow into the worm and digest it.

In 1888, Zopf described the unique phenomenon in which Arthrobotrys oligospora produces adhesion networks to capture nematodes. He described how Arthrobotrys can produce a variety of trap morphologies, ranging from simple adhesive hyphae to complex adhesive trapping structures. Some species are even known to immobilise nematodes remotely, which indicates an ability to secrete specific nematotoxic metabolites.

A majority of Arthrobotrys capture and consume copepods, mites, collembola, dipterans, but primarily nematodes.. They have been tested for potential use in pest biocontrol.

== Taxonomy ==
Arthrobotrys is the largest genus among Orbiliaceae. At present, 166 species are listed in the Species Fungorum.

The genus Arthrobotrys was first described and named by Corda in 1839, with A. superba as the type species. He based the description on their conidial and trapping mechanisms. Previously, all taxa that produced adhesive networks were referred to as Arthrobotrys.

These taxa are characterised by regularly 1-septate conidia growing on the nodes or short denticles of conidiophores. At the time of its establishment, this genus was known for saprobic taxa.

The Arthrobotrys clade as treated by Baral et al. (2018). includes five unpublished infrageneric taxa, which are basically equivalent to the five previously described genera Arthrobotrys, Dactylella Grove, Dactylellina Morelet, Drechslerella Subram. and Gamsylella.. Of these genera, four are predacious and monophyletic, whereas Dactylella, which comprises all non-predacious members of the group, is paraphyletic according to Baral & al. (2018). More than 100 species have been published in the genus Arthrobotrys. However, Scholler & al. (1999) recognised only 46 species in the genus when newly circumscribed to include those species with three-dimensional adhesive networks. Teleomorphs of the Arthrobotrys clade are mostly characterised by narrow, subulate and curved, falcate ascospores with a small, apical spore body.

== Anamorph-Teleomorph Relation ==
Fungi of the Arthrobotrys complex are anamorphs of species of discomycetes in the family Orbiliaceae. This means that Arthrobotrys is the predatory, asexual and anamorphic stage while Orbilia produces the spores and is hence the sexual and teleomorph stage. Because life cycles in some fungi are polymorphic and include both meiosporic and mitosporic structures (teleomorphs and anamorphs), occurring separately in space and time, the same species may have been studied and named independently, hence being a good example of the problem of dual names.

=== Dual Names ===
When recognising the genus Orbilia in a wide sense, then under the one-fungus-one-name rule, the name Orbilia takes precedence over Arthrobotrys. Members of Orbilia with predacious capabilities together with some non-predacious taxa form a monophyletic group, here referred to as the Arthrobotrys clade.

=== Species connection ===
Studies have linked specific Orbilia species to Arthrobotrys types, such as Orbilia blumenaviensis producing Arthrobotrys vermicola.

== Habitat ==
Arthrobotrys are widely distributed in soil, decomposing organic matter, and fresh water. They are mainly nematophagous but also mycoparasitic. Fungi with this lifestyle often occur in microhabitats with low concentrations of available nitrogen.

== Species ==
- Arthrobotrys aggregata Mekht. 1979
- Arthrobotrys alaskana Matsush.) Oorschot 1985
- Arthrobotrys amerospora S. Schenck, W.B. Kendr. & Pramer 1977
- Arthrobotrys anomala G.L. Barron & J.G.N. Davidson 1972
- Arthrobotrys apscheronica Mekht. 1973
- Arthrobotrys arthrobotryoides (Berl.) Lindau 1906
- Arthrobotrys azerbaijanica (Mekht.) Oorschot 1985
- Arthrobotrys bakunika Mekht. 1979
- Arthrobotrys botryospora G.L. Barron 1979
- Arthrobotrys brochopaga (Drechsler) S. Schenck, W.B. Kendr. & Pramer 1977
- Arthrobotrys chazarica Mekht. 1998
- Arthrobotrys chilensis Allesch. & Henn. 1897
- Arthrobotrys cladodes Drechsler 1937
- Arthrobotrys clavispora (R.C. Cooke) S. Schenck, W.B. Kendr. & Pramer 1977
- Arthrobotrys compacta Mekht. 1973
- Arthrobotrys conoides Drechsler 1937
- Arthrobotrys constringens Dowsett, J. Reid & Kalkat 1984
- Arthrobotrys cylindrospora (R.C. Cooke) S. Schenck, W.B. Kendr. & Pramer 1977
- Arthrobotrys dactyloides Drechsler 1937
- Arthrobotrys deflectens Bres. 1903
- Arthrobotrys dendroides Kuthub., Muid & J. Webster 1985
- Arthrobotrys doliiformis Soprunov 1958
- Arthrobotrys drechsleri Soprunov 1958
- Arthrobotrys elegans (Subram. & Chandrash.) Seifert & W.B. Kendr. 1983
- Arthrobotrys ellipsospora Tubaki & K. Yamanaka 1984
- Arthrobotrys entomopaga Drechsler 1944
- Arthrobotrys ferox Onofri & S. Tosi 1992
- Arthrobotrys foliicola Matsush. 1975
- Arthrobotrys fruticulosa Mekht. 1979
- Arthrobotrys globospora (Soprunov) Sidorova, Gorlenko & Nalepina 1964,(Soprunov) Mekht. 1964
- Arthrobotrys haptospora (Drechsler) S. Schenck, W.B. Kendr. & Pramer 1977
- Arthrobotrys hertziana M. Scholler & A. Rubner 1999
- Arthrobotrys indica (Chowdhry & Bahl) M. Scholler, Hagedorn & A. Rubner 1999
- Arthrobotrys irregularis (Matr.) Mekht. 1971
- Arthrobotrys javanica (Rifai & R.C. Cooke) Jarow. 1970
- Arthrobotrys kirghizica Soprunov 1958
- Arthrobotrys longa Mekht. 1973
- Arthrobotrys longiphora (Xing Z. Liu & B.S. Lu) M. Scholler, Hagedorn & A. Rubner 1999
- Arthrobotrys longiramulifera Matsush. 1995
- Arthrobotrys longispora Soprunov, Preuss 1853
- Arthrobotrys mangrovispora Swe, Jeewon, Pointing & K.D. Hyde 2008
- Arthrobotrys megaspora (Boedijn) Oorschot 1985
- Arthrobotrys microscaphoides (Xing Z. Liu & B.S. Lu) M. Scholler, Hagedorn & A. Rubner 1999
- Arthrobotrys microspora (Soprunov) Mekht. 1971
- Arthrobotrys multisecundaria W.F. Hu & K.Q. Zhang 2006
- Arthrobotrys musiformis Drechsler 1937
- Arthrobotrys nematopaga (Mekht. & Faizieva) A. Rubner 1996
- Arthrobotrys nonseptata Z.F. Yu, S.F. Li & K.Q. Zhang 2009
- Arthrobotrys oligospora Fresen. 1850
- Arthrobotrys oudemansii M. Scholler, Hagedorn & A. Rubner 2000
- Arthrobotrys oviformis Soprunov 1958
- Arthrobotrys perpasta (R.C. Cooke) Jarow. 1970
- Arthrobotrys polycephala (Drechsler) Rifai 1968
- Arthrobotrys pseudoclavata (Z.Q. Miao & Xing Z. Liu) J. Chen, L.L. Xu, B. Liu & Xing Z. Liu 2007
- Arthrobotrys pyriformis (Juniper) Schenk, W.B. Kendr. & Pramer 1977
- Arthrobotrys recta Preuss 1851
- Arthrobotrys robusta Dudd. 1952
- Arthrobotrys rosea Massee 1885
- Arthrobotrys scaphoides (Peach) S. Schenck, W.B. Kendr. & Pramer 1977
- Arthrobotrys sclerohypha (Drechsler) S. Schenck, W.B. Kendr. & Pramer 1977
- Arthrobotrys shahriari (Mekht.) M. Scholler, Hagedorn & A. Rubner 1999
- Arthrobotrys shizishanna (X.F. Liu & K.Q. Zhang) J. Chen, L.L. Xu, B. Liu & Xing Z. Liu 2007
- Arthrobotrys sinensis (Xing Z. Liu & K.Q. Zhang) M. Scholler, Hagedorn & A. Rubner 1999
- Arthrobotrys soprunovii Mekht. 1979
- Arthrobotrys stilbacea J.A. Mey. 1958
- Arthrobotrys straminicola Pidopl. 1948
- Arthrobotrys superba Corda 1839
- Arthrobotrys tabrizica (Mekht.) M. Scholler, Hagedorn & A. Rubner 1999
- Arthrobotrys venusta K.Q. Zhang 1994
- Arthrobotrys vermicola (R.C. Cooke & Satchuth.) Rifai 1968
- Arthrobotrys yunnanensis M.H. Mo & K.Q. Zhang 2005
