= Gamsylella =

Scientific classification
- Kingdom: Fungi
- Division: Ascomycota
- Class: Orbiliomycetes
- Order: Orbiliales
- Family: Orbiliaceae
- Genus: Gamsylella

Species
- See text

Genus of fungi

Gamsylella is a genus comprising 4 species of fungi in the family Orbiliaceae. It is found in Australia.

The genus name of Gamsylella is in honour of Konrad Walter Gams (1934 - 2017), who was an Austrian botanist and scientist.

The genus was circumscribed by Markus Scholler, Gregor Hagedorn and Annemarthe Rubner in Sydowia Vol.51 on page 108 in 1999.

== Species ==
- Gamsylella gephyropaga (Drechsler) M. Scholler, Hagedorn & A. Rubner 1999
- Gamsylella lobata (Dudd.) M. Scholler, Hagedorn & A. Rubner 1999
- Gamsylella phymatopaga (Drechsler) M. Scholler, Hagedorn & A. Rubner 1999
- Gamsylella robusta (J.S. McCulloch) M. Scholler, Hagedorn & A. Rubner 1999
