= Dwayaangam =

Scientific classification
- Kingdom: Fungi
- Division: Ascomycota
- Class: Orbiliomycetes
- Order: Orbiliales
- Family: Orbiliaceae
- Genus: Dwayaangam; Subram. (1978)

Type species
- Dwayaangam quadridens (Drechsler) Subram. (1978)

Species
- See text.

Genus of fungi

Dwayaangam is a genus of fungi in the family Orbiliaceae consisting of 8 species.

== Species ==
- Dwayaangam colodena Sokolski & Bérubé 2006
- Dwayaangam cornuta Descals 1982
- Dwayaangam dichotoma Nawawi 1985
- Dwayaangam gamundiae Cazau, Aramb. & Cabello 1993
- Dwayaangam heterospora G.L. Barron 1991
- Dwayaangam junci Kohlm., Baral & Volkm.-Kohlm. 1998
- Dwayaangam quadridens (Drechsler) Subram. 1978
- Dwayaangam yakuensis (Matsush.) Matsush. 1981
