= Dactylella =

Scientific classification
- Kingdom: Fungi
- Division: Ascomycota
- Class: Orbiliomycetes
- Order: Orbiliales
- Family: Orbiliaceae
- Genus: Dactylella; Grove

Species
- See text

Genus of fungi

Dactylella is a genus comprising 72 species of mitosporic fungi in the family Orbiliaceae. They are notable for trapping and eating nematodes.

Members of this genus form a noose structure from several elongate cells. When stimulated by a nematode passing through the structure, the cells swell, tightening the noose and trapping the nematode. Filaments then grow into the nematode to absorb nutrients.

== Species ==
- Dactylella acrochaeta Drechsler 1952
- Dactylella alaskana Matsush. 1975
- Dactylella alba (Preuss) Sacc. 1886
- Dactylella ambrosia (Gadd & Loos) K.Q. Zhang, Xing Z. Liu & L. Cao 1995
- Dactylella anisomeres Drechsler 1962
- Dactylella aphrobrocha Drechsler 1950
- Dactylella arcuata Scheuer & J. Webster 1990
- Dactylella arnaudii Yadav 1960
- Dactylella atractoides Drechsler 1943
- Dactylella attenuata Xing Z. Liu, K.Q. Zhang & R.H. Gao 1997
- Dactylella beijingensis Xing Z. Liu, C.Y. Shen & W.F. Chiu 1992
- Dactylella candida (Nees) de Hoog 1985
- Dactylella chichisimensis Ts. Watan. 2001
- Dactylella cionopaga Drechsler 1950
- Dactylella clavata R.H. Gao, M.H. Sun & Xing Z. Liu 1995
- Dactylella clavispora J. Chen, L.L. Xu, B. Liu & Xing Z. Liu 2007
- Dactylella coccinella Ying Yang & Xing Z. Liu 2005
- Dactylella coelobrocha Drechsler 1947
- Dactylella copepodii G.L. Barron 1990
- Dactylella coprophila Faurel & Schotter 1965
- Dactylella crassa Z.Q. Miao, Lei & Xing Z. Liu 1999
- Dactylella cystospora R.C. Cooke
- Dactylella dasguptae (S.K. Shome & U. Shome) de Hoog & Oorschot 1985
- Dactylella deodycoides Drechsler
- Dactylella dianchiensis Y. Hao & K.Q. Zhang 2004
- Dactylella dorsalia Y. Zhang bis, Z.F. Yu & K.Q. Zhang 2007
- Dactylella formosana J.Y. Liou, G.Y. Liou & Tzean 1995
- Dactylella formosensis Sawada 1959
- Dactylella fusariispora (Mekht.) K.Q. Zhang, Xing Z. Liu & L. Cao 1995
- Dactylella fusiformis Grove
- Dactylella gampsospora (Drechsler) de Hoog & Oorschot 1985
- Dactylella gephyropaga Drechsler 1937
- Dactylella haptospora Drechsler) K.Q. Zhang, Xing Z. Liu & L. Cao 1995
- Dactylella heptameres Drechsler 1943
- Dactylella heterospora Drechsler 1943
- Dactylella huisuniana J.L. Chen, T.L. Huang & Tzean 1998
- Dactylella implexa (Berk. & Broome) Sacc. 1886
- Dactylella inquisitor Jarow. 1971
- Dactylella intermedia T.F. Li, Lei & Xing Z. Liu 1998
- Dactylella lignatilis M.H. Mo & K.Q. Zhang 2005
- Dactylella lysipaga Drechsler 1937
- Dactylella mammillata S.M. Dixon 1952
- Dactylella megalobrocha Glockling 1994
- Dactylella microaquatica Tubaki 1957
- Dactylella nuorilangana X.F. Liu & K.Q. Zhang 2006
- Dactylella oxyspora (Sacc. & Marchal) Matsush. 1971
- Dactylella panlongana X.F. Liu & K.Q. Zhang 2006
- Dactylella papayae Sawada 1959
- Dactylella passalopaga Drechsler 1936
- Dactylella piriformis (Preuss) Sacc. 1886
- Dactylella plumicola Grove 1916
- Dactylella polycephala Drechsler 1937
- Dactylella polyctona (Drechsler) K.Q. Zhang, Xing Z. Liu & L. Cao 1995
- Dactylella pseudoclavata Z.Q. Miao & Xing Z. Liu 2003
- Dactylella pulchra (Linder) de Hoog & Oorschot 1985
- Dactylella ramosa Matsush. 1971
- Dactylella rhombica Matsush. 1971
- Dactylella rhopalota Drechsler 1943
- Dactylella sclerohypha Drechsler 1950
- Dactylella shizishanna X.F. Liu & K.Q. Zhang 2003
- Dactylella stenobrocha Drechsler 1950
- Dactylella stenocrepis Drechsler 1962
- Dactylella strobilodes Drechsler 1950
- Dactylella tenuis Drechsler 1943
- Dactylella thaumasia Drechsler 1937
- Dactylella turkmenica Soprunov 1958
- Dactylella ulmi Puttemans
- Dactylella vermiformis Z.F. Yu, Ying Zhang & K.Q. Zhang 2007
- Dactylella xinjiangensis J. Chen, L.L. Xu, B. Liu & Xing Z. Liu 2007
- Dactylella yoaniae Y.D. Zhang & X.G. Zhang 2011
- Dactylella yunnanensis K.Q. Zhang, Xing Z. Liu & L. Cao 1995
- Dactylella zhongdianensis J. Zhang & K.Q. Zhang 2005
