= Charles Drechsler =

American mycologist (1892–1986)

Charles Frank Drechsler (May 1, 1892 – February 5, 1986) was an American mycologist with 45 years of research with the United States Department of Agriculture. He spent considerable time working with cereal fungal diseases, and the genus Drechslera was named after him. Drechsler also worked extensively on oomycete fungi and their interactions with vegetable plants. Drechsler was recognized as a leading authority on helminthosporia, oomycetes, and other parasitic fungi.

== Early life ==
Drechsler was born on May 1, 1892, in Wisconsin. He was raised by his parents Louis and Bertha Alvina Schultz Drechsler on a farm near the village of Butternut. Lois and Bertha were of German origin, and Charles spoke only German until learning English in school.

== Education ==
Drechsler attended the University of Wisconsin–Madison, where he started off studying engineering but switched to botany after attending a mycology lecture. He earned his bachelor's degree in 1913, and went on to complete a Master of Science in plant pathology in 1914, producing a thesis on bacterial black rot of crucifers. Drechsler then enrolled at Harvard University, working alongside noted mycologist Roland Thaxter. His dissertation involved the taxonomic placement of the genus Actinomyces.

== Employment at the U.S. Department of Agriculture ==
In 1917, Dr. Drechsler moved to Washington D.C. and began his career with the United States Department of Agriculture. His first position was as an assistant with the Bureau of Plant Industry, Soils, and Agricultural Engineering. Only a year later, Drechsler served with the U.S. Army Corps of Engineers during World War I. He served for two years and then came back to work continuously with the USDA for the following decades. He was promoted from assistant pathologist (1924) to associate pathologist (1924) and then pathologist(1929). Dr. Drechsler began his research in cereal diseases. The Genus Drechslera was named after him by another mycologist. Dr. Drechsler was eventually moved from cereal disease research to vegetable disease research. He studied oomycete fungal plant diseases, many from the Genera Pythium, Phytophthora, and Aphanomyces, and identified several new species. He drew many illustrations of newly identified fungi. He published numerous papers (located in the Notable Works section below) on oomycetes that destroy nematodes, amoebae, and soil rhizopods. Dr. Drechsler was recognized for his extensive work by being named a fellow in the American Phytopathological Society in 1966 and named Distinguished Mycologist by the Mycological Society of America in 1984.

== Personal life ==
Drechsler's wife, Mary Florence Morscher, was also a botanist and also worked at the U.S. Department of Agriculture. The two met at a Washington Botanical Society annual dinner dance. They were married in 1930 and eventually had three children and remained married until Charles's death in 1986. The family were regular members at the Clarendon Methodist Church in Arlington, Virginia, and later became members at the University Park United Methodist Church in College Park, Maryland.

After retiring from the Department of Agriculture, Drechsler continued his research at his home near Beltsville, Maryland. During 20 years of post-retirement research, Drechsler collaborated with the Agricultural Research Service. Drechsler was outlived by his wife Mary Florence, son Charles, daughter Kathryn Finnegan of Flemington, and his younger son, Robert.

== Works ==
- 1933. Morphological diversity among fungi capturing and destroying nematodes. Washington, J. Acad. Sci. 23:138-141.
- 1933. Morphological features of some more fungi that capture and kill nematodes. Washington, J. Acad. Sci. 23:267-270.
- 1933. Several more fungi that prey on nematodes. Washington, J. Acad. Sci. 23:355-357.
- 1933. Morphological features of some fungi capturing and killing amoebae.
- 1934. Organs of capture in some fungi preying on nematodes" Mycologia 26:135-144.
- 1934. Pedilospora dactylopaga n. sp., a fungus capturing and consuming testaceous rhizopods. Washington, L. Acad. Sci. 24:395-402.
- 1935. Some conidial phycomycetes destructive to terricolous amoebae" Mycologia 27:6-40.
- 1935. Some non-catenulateconidial phycomycetes preying on terricolous amoebae" Mycologia 27:176-223.
- 1935. A new species of conidial phycomycete preying on nematodes" Mycologia 27:206-215.
- 1935. A new mucedinaceous fungus capturing and consuming amoeba verrucosa" Mycologia 27:216-223.
- 1936. A new species of Stylopage preying on nematodes" Mycologia 28:241-246.
- 1936. New conidial phycomycetes destructive to terricolous amoebae" Mycologia 28:363-389.
- 1936. A Fusarium-like species of Dactylella capturing and consuming testaceous rhizopods. Washington, J. Acad. Sci. 26:397-404.
- 1937. New zoopagaceae destructive to soil rhizopods" Mycologia 29:229-249.
- 1937. Some hyphomycetes that prey on free-living terricolous nematodes" Mycologia 29:447-552.
- 1937. A species of Tridentaria preying on Difflugia constricta. Washington, J. Acad Sci 27:391-398.
- 1938. Two Hyphomycetes parasitic on oospores of root-rotting oomycetes" Phytopathology 28:81-103.
- 1938. New zoopagaceae capturing and consuming soil amoebae" Mycologia 31:137-157.
- 1939. A few new zoopagaceae destructive to large soil rhizopods" Mycologia 31:128-153.
- 1939. Five new zoopagaceae destructive to rhizopods and nematodes" Mycologia 31:388-415.
- 1940. Three fungi destructive to free-living terricolous nematodes. Washington, J. Acad Sci 30:240-254.
- 1940. Three new hyphomycetes preying on free-living terricolous nematodes" Mycologia 32:448-470.
- 1941. Four phycomycetes destructive to nematodes and rhizopods" Mycologia 33:248-269.
- 1941. Some hyphomycetes parasitic on free-living terricolous nematodes" Phytopathology 31:773-802.
- 1941. Predaceous fungi. Biol. Rev. 16:265-290.
- 1942. New species of Acaulopage and Cochlonema destructive to soil and amoebae" Mycologia 34:274-297.
- 1942. Two zoophagous species of Acrostalagmus with multicellular Desmidiospora-like chlaymidiospores. Washington, J. Acad Sci 32:343-350.
- 1943. Antagonism and parasitism among some oomycetes associated with root rot. Washington, J. Acad Sci 33:21-28
- 1943. Another hyphomycetous fungus parasitic on Pythium oospores" Phytopathology 33:227-233.
- 1943. A new non-helicoid bispores Helicocephalum parasitizing nematode eggs" Mycologia 35:134-141.
- 1943. A new nematode-capturing Dactylella and several related hyphomycetes" Mycologia 35:339-362.
- 1943. Two new hasidiomyceteous fungi parasitic on nematodes. Washington, J. Acad Sci 33:183-189.
- 1944. Three hyphomycetes that capture nematodes in adhesive networks" Mycologia 36:138-171.
- 1944. A species of Arhtrobotrys that captures springtails" Mycologia 36:382-2399
- 1945. Several additional phycomycetes subsisting on nematodes and amoebae" Mycologia 37:1-31.
- 1946. A nematode-destroying phycomycete forming immotile spores in aerial evacuation tubes. Bull. Torrey Bot. Club 73:1-17.
- 1946. A clamp-bearing fungus parasitic and predaceous on nematodes" Mycologia 38:1-23.
- 1946. A new hyphomycete parasitic on a species of nematode" Phytopathology 36:213-217.
- 1946. Three new Zoopagaceae subsisting on soil amoebae" Mycologia 38:120-143.
- 1946. A species of Harsporium invading its nematode host from the stoma. Bull. Torrey Bot. Club. 73:557-564.
- 1947. A nematode-strangling Dactylella with broad quadriseptate conidia" Mycologia 39:5-20.
- 1947. Three Zoopagaceous fungi that capture and consume soil-inhabiting rhizopods" Mycologia 39:253-281.
- 1947. Three new species of Zoopage predaceous on terricolous rhizopods" Mycologia 39:379-408.
- 1948. Three Zoopagaceae that subsist by capturing soil amoebae" Mycologia 40:85-105.
- 1949. A nematode-capturing fungus with anastomosing clamp-bearing hyphae" Mycologia 41:369-387.
- 1950. Several species of Dactylella and Dactylaria that capture free-living nematodes" Mycologia 42:1-79.
- 1950. A Dactylella with conidia resembling those of Dactylella stenobrocha in size and shape" Mycologia 42:367-373.
- 1950. A Harposporium infecting eelworms by means of internally adhering awl-shaped conidia. Washington, J. Acad Sci 40:405-409.
- 1951. Various zoopagaceous fungi subsisting on protozoans and eelworms" Mycologia 43:161-185.
- 1951. An entomophthoraceous tartigrade parasite producing small conidia on propulsive cells in spicate heads. Bull. Torrey Bot. Club. 78:183-200.
- 1952. Another nematode-strangulating Dactylella and some related hyphomycetes" Mycologia 44:533-556.
- 1952. Widespread distribution of Delacroxia coronate and other saprophytic Entomophthoraceae in plant detritus" Science 115:575-576.
- 1954. A nematode-capturing fungus with clamp-connections and curved conidia. Washington, J. Acad Sci 44:82-85.
- 1954. Production of aerial arthrospores by Harposporium bysmatosporium. Bull. Torrey Bot. Club. 81:411-413.
- 1954. Some hyphomycetes that capture eelworms in southern States" Mycologia 46:762-782.
- 1955. Additional species of Zoopagaceae subsisting on rhizopods and eelworms" Mycologia 47:364-388.
- 1955. A new species of Rhopalomyces occurring in Florida. Bull. Torrey Bot. Club. 82:473-479.
- 1957. A nematode-capturing phycomycete forming chlamydospores terminally on lateral branches" Mycologia 49:387-391.
- 1959. Several zoopagaceae subsisting on a nematode and on some terricolous amoebae" Mycologia 51(6):787-823.
- 1959. Two new species of Harposporium parasitic on nematodes. Journal of the Washington Academy of Sciences. 49(4):106-112.
- 1960. A clamp-bearing fungus using stalked adhesive young chlamydospores in capturing amoebae. Sydowia, Annales Mycologici Ser. II 14:246-257.
- 1961. Two additional species of Dactylella parasitic on Pythium oospores. Sydowia, Annales Mycologici Ser. II 15:92-97.
- 1961. Some clampless hyphomycetes predacious on nematodes and rhizopods. Sydowia, Annales Mycologici Ser. II 15:92-97.
- 1962. A nematode-capturing phycomycete with distally adhesive branches and proximally imbedded fusiform conidia" American Journal of Botany 49(10):1089- 1095.
- 1963. A new nematode-destroying hyphomycete of the Genus Harposporium" American Journal of Botany 50(8):839-842.
- 1963. A slender-spored Dactylella parasitic on Pythium oospores" Phytopathology 53(9):993-994.
- 1965. A Harposporium parasitic on rotifers. Mycopathologia et Mycologia Applicata. 27:285-288.
- 1965. A Tridentaria subsisting on testaceous rhizopods and Pythium oospores. Sydowia, Annales Mycologici Ser. II 18:359-362.
- 1968. A nematode-destroying species of Cephalosporiopsis. Sydowia, Annales Mycologici Ser. II 22:194-198.
- 1968. A new nematode-destroying Harposporium with slender helicoid conidia. Sydowia, Annales Mycologici Ser. II 22:189-193.
- 1968. A new nematode-destroying Harposporium. Am. J. Bot. 55(10):1251-1253.
- 1969. A Tulasnella parasitic on Amoebae terricola. Am. J. Bot. 56(10):1217-1220.
- 1975. A nematode-destroying hyphomycete forming parallel multiseptate hyaline conidia in circular arrangement. Am. J. Bot. 62(10):1073-1077.
