= Nematophagous fungus =

Carnivorous fungi specialized in trapping and digesting nematodes

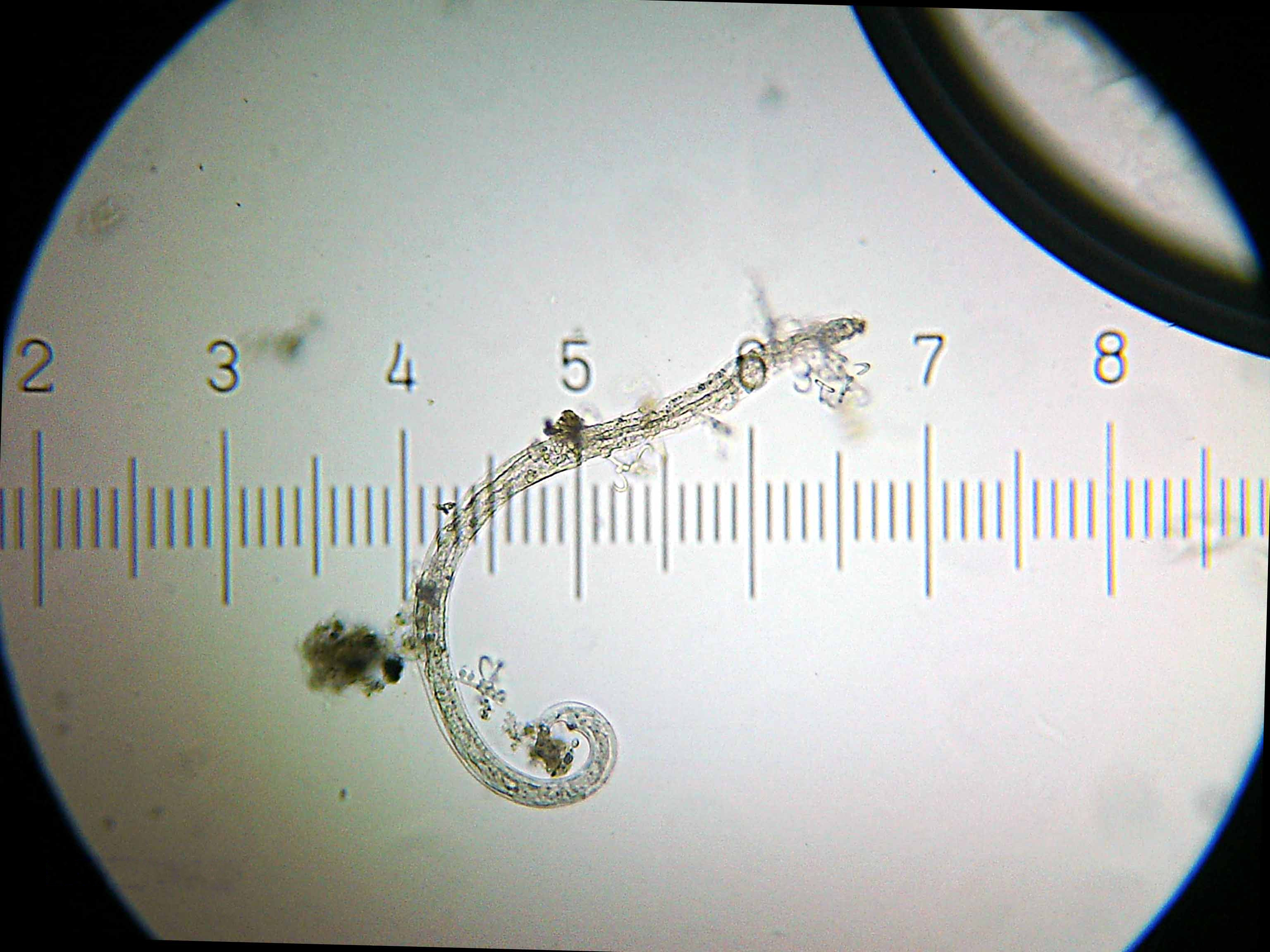
A dead nematode with Harposporium anguillulae growing out of it. Numbered ticks are 122 μm apart.

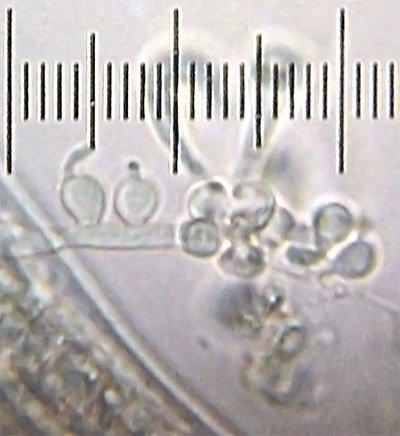
A closer look at H. anguillulae from the previous image. Numbered ticks are 20 μm apart.

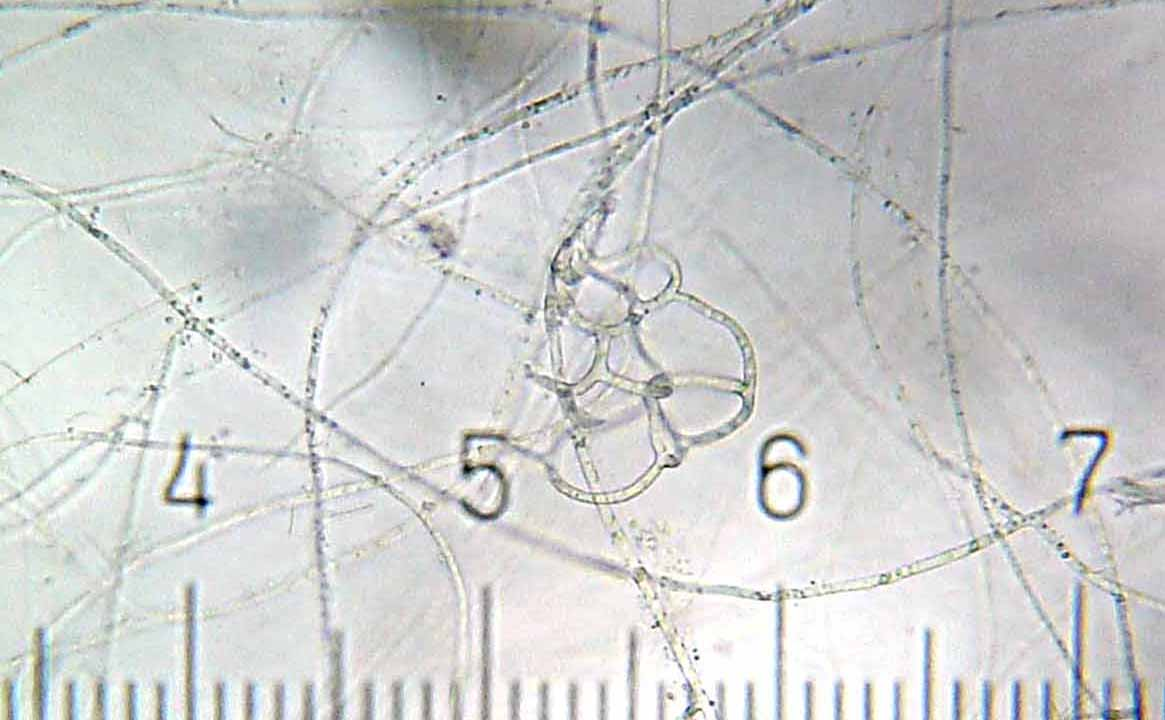
A fungus of the genus Arthrobotrys, showing adhesive nets which it uses to trap nematodes. Numbered ticks are 122 μm apart.

Nematophagous fungi are carnivorous fungi specialized in trapping and digesting nematodes. More than 700 species are known. Species exist that live inside the nematodes from the beginning and others that catch them, mostly with glue traps or in rings, some of which constrict on contact. Some species possess both types of traps. Another technique is to stun the nematodes using toxins, a method employed by Coprinus comatus, Stropharia rugosoannulata, and the family Pleurotaceae. The habit of feeding on nematodes has arisen many times among fungi, as is demonstrated by the fact that nematophagous species are found in all major fungal groups. Nematophagous fungi can be useful in controlling those nematodes that eat crops. Purpureocillium, for example, can be used as a bio-nematicide.

== Types ==
Fungi that feed on nematodes (as the most abundant and convenient prey species) mostly live in nitrogen-deficient habitats. These fungi can be divided into four main groups according to the methods they use to catch their prey. Some use a mechanical means, an adhesive or a mechanical hypha trap. Some produce a toxin and use it to immobilise the nematode. Some are parasitic, using their spores to gain entry into their prey, and some are egg parasites, inserting their hyphal tips into the eggs or cysts, or into females before the eggs are deposited.

== Diversity ==
Nematophagous fungi have been found throughout the world in a wide range of habitats and climates, but few from extreme environments. Most studied have been the species that attack the nematodes of interest to farmers, horticulturists and foresters, but there are large numbers of species as yet undescribed. The sexual stage of Orbilia occurs on rotting wood on land or in fresh water, while the asexual stage occurs in marine, fresh water and terrestrial habitats. Arthrobotrys dactyloides was the first species to be discovered in brackish water, and other species have been found on mangroves.

== Ecology ==
Nematode-trapping fungi are mostly concentrated in the upper part of the soil, in pastures, leaf litter, mangroves and certain shallow aquatic habitats. They employ techniques such as adhesive hyphal strands, adhesive knobs, adhesive nets formed from hyphal threads, loops of hyphae which tighten round any ensnared nematodes and non-constricting loops. When the nematode has been restrained, the hyphae penetrate the cuticle and the internal tissues of the nematode are devoured.

Arthrobotrys oligospora, a net-building species of fungus, can detect the presence of nematodes nearby in the soil and only builds its snares when they are present. This is presumably because building the net is a highly energy-consuming process; the fungus is alerted to the presence of the nematode by detecting the pheromones, such as ascarosides, with which the worms communicate. The fungus takes active steps to attract its prey by producing olfactory cues that mimic those used by the worm to find food and attract mates. Arthrobotrys dactyloides is a species that employs a loop of hypha to catch nematodes; when one tries to pass through the ring, the loop constricts with great rapidity, trapping the prey.

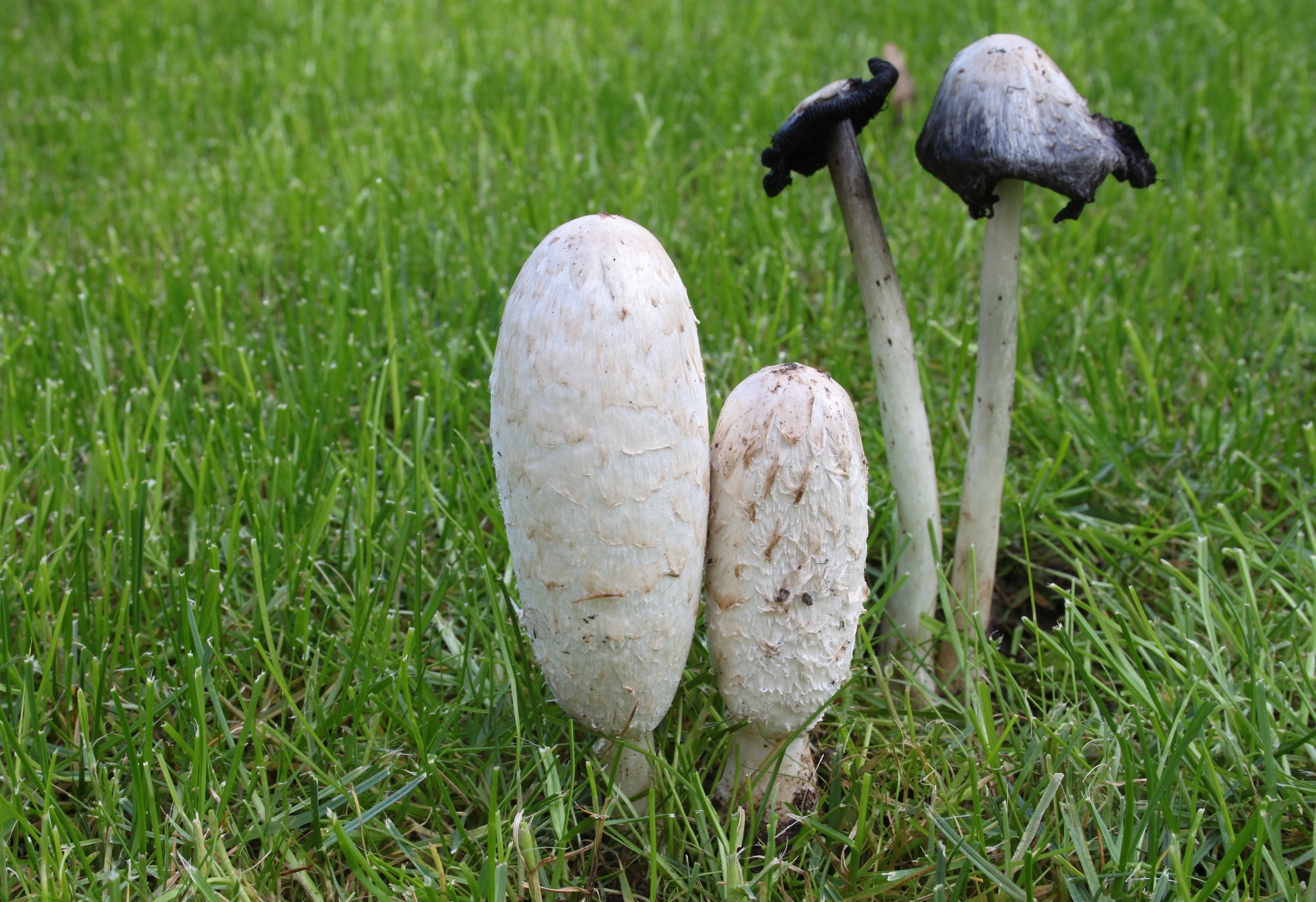
The hyphae of shaggy ink caps attack nematodes

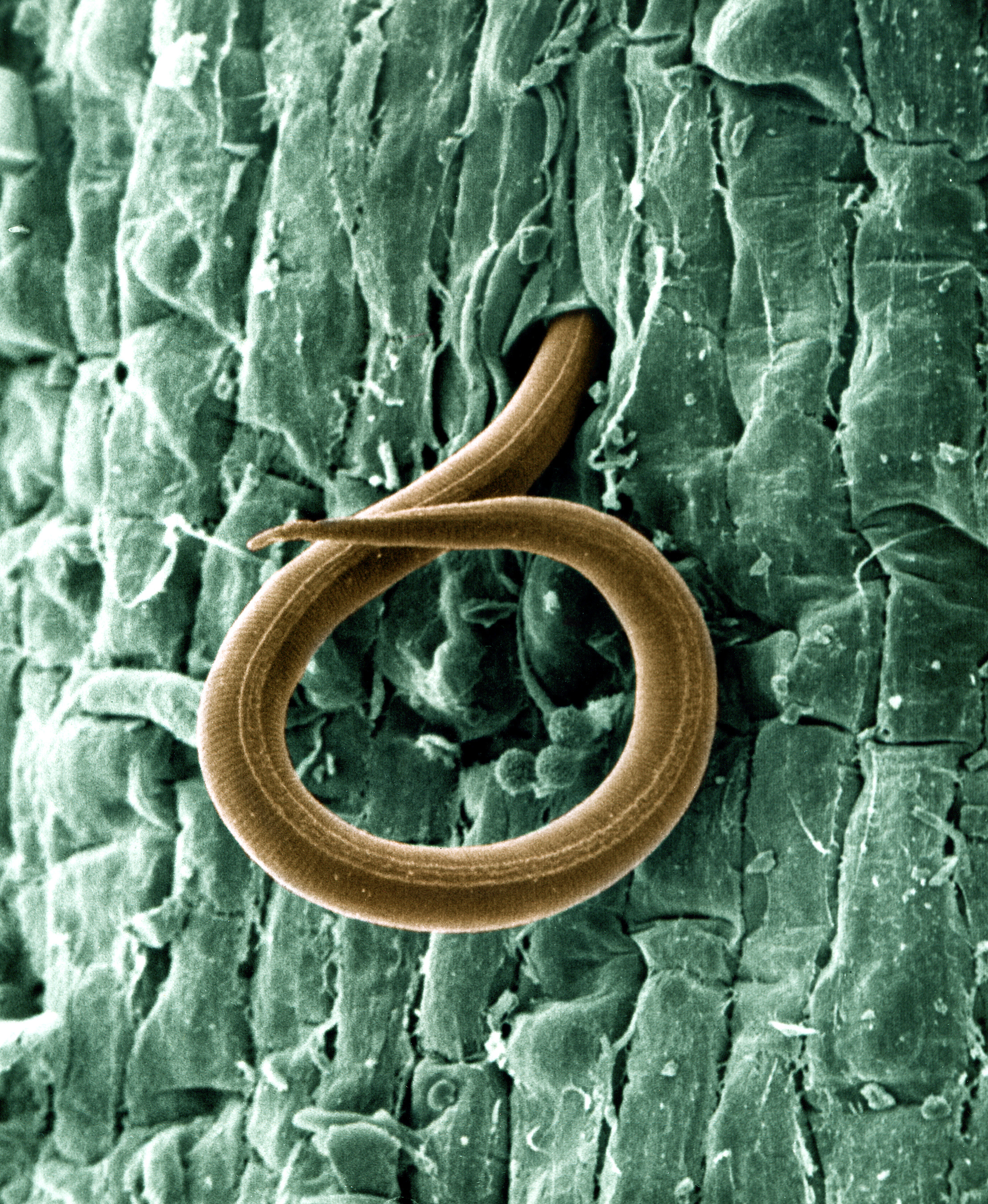
Juvenile root-knot nematode (Meloidogyne incognita) penetrating a tomato root

Some nematophagous fungi produce toxic substances which immobilise nematodes. For example, the hypha of the shaggy ink cap (Coprinus comatus) attacks the free-living soil nematode Panagrellus redivivus with a structure known as a spiny ball; this is used to damage the nematode cuticle to enable immobilisation, after which the hypha pierces the skin and digests the contents.

Most endoparasitic fungi have spores that are attracted to soil nematodes and tend to congregate in the mouth region. Having penetrated the cuticle, the hyphae grow throughout the nematode, absorbing its tissues. Escape tubes emerge from these and grow through the cuticle, and in due course, further motile spores exit through these, ready to infect other nematodes. In other species of fungi, it is conidia rather than spores which are encountered by the nematode and infect it in a similar way. In the case of Harposporium anguillulae, the sickle-shaped conidia are ingested by the nematode and lodge in the oesophagus or gut from where they invade the tissues.

In ovoparasitic species, the hypha flattens itself against an egg, appressoria indicating that infection is imminent or underway. It then pierces the chorion and devours the embryonic nematode before producing conidiophores and moving on to nearby eggs.

== Biological control ==
Some species of nematophagous fungi are being investigated for use in biological pest control. Purpureocillium lilacinum, for example, infests the plant-parasitic Meloidogyne incognita, which attacks the roots of many cultivated plants. Trials have provided varying results, with some strains being aggressive and others less pathogenic, and some strains that appeared promising in the lab proved ineffective in the field. Arthrobotrys dactyloides shows promise at controlling the cosmopolitan plant-parasitic root-knot nematode Meloidogyne javanica.

== See also ==
- Fungus
- Entomopathogenic fungus
- Biological pest control

== Bibliography ==
- Zhang, Ke-Qin; Hyde, Kevin D. (2014). Nematode-Trapping Fungi. Springer Science & Business. ISBN 978-94-017-8730-7.
