= Dicranidion =

Scientific classification
- Kingdom: Fungi
- Division: Ascomycota
- Class: Orbiliomycetes
- Order: Orbiliales
- Family: Orbiliaceae
- Genus: Dicranidion

Species
- See text

Genus of fungi

Dicranidion is a genus comprising 13 species of fungi in the family Orbiliaceae.

== Species ==
- Dicranidion amazonense Matsush. 1981
- Dicranidion argentinense Speg. 1910
- Dicranidion dactylopagum (Drechsler) Peek & Solheim 1955
- Dicranidion fissile K. Ando & Tubaki 1984
- Dicranidion fragile Harkn. 1885
- Dicranidion gracile Matsush. 1971
- Dicranidion inaequale Tubaki & T. Yokoy. 1971
- Dicranidion incarnatum (G.W. Martin) Peek & Solheim 1955
- Dicranidion macrosporum Prasher, Manohar., Kunwar & D.K. Agarwal 2008
- Dicranidion ontariense Matsush. 1987
- Dicranidion palmicola Matsush. 1981
- Dicranidion parapalmicola Matsush. 1993
- Dicranidion tenue Matsush. 1993
