= Monacrosporium =

Scientific classification
- Kingdom: Fungi
- Division: Ascomycota
- Class: Orbiliomycetes
- Order: Orbiliales
- Family: Orbiliaceae
- Genus: Monacrosporium

Species
- See text

Genus of fungi

Monacrosporium is a genus of fungi in the family Orbiliaceae. There are 53 species.

== Species ==
- Monacrosporium ambrosium Gadd & Loos 1947
- Monacrosporium aphrobrochum (Drechsler) Subram. 1964
- Monacrosporium appendiculatum (Mekht.) Xing Z. Liu & K.Q. Zhang 1994
- Monacrosporium asthenopagum (Drechsler) A. Rubner 1996
- Monacrosporium bembicodes (Drechsler) Subram. 1964
- Monacrosporium carestianum Ferraris 1904
- Monacrosporium chiuanum Xing Z. Liu & K.Q. Zhang 1994
- Monacrosporium coelobrochum (Drechsler) Subram. 1964
- Monacrosporium cystosporum R.C. Cooke & C.H. Dickinson 1965
- Monacrosporium deodycoides (Drechsler) R.C. Cooke & C.H. Dickinson 1965
- Monacrosporium drechsleri (Tarjan) R.C. Cooke & C.H. Dickinson 1965
- Monacrosporium ellipsosporum (Preuss) R.C. Cooke & C.H. Dickinson 1965
- Monacrosporium eudermatum (Drechsler) Subram. 1964
- Monacrosporium fusiforme R.C. Cooke & C.H. Dickinson 1963
- Monacrosporium globosporum Preuss 1967
- Monacrosporium guizhouense K.Q. Zhang, Xing Z. Liu & L. Cao 1996
- Monacrosporium haptotylum (Drechsler) Xing Z. Liu & K.Q. Zhang 1994
- Monacrosporium heterosporum (Drechsler) Subram. 1964
- Monacrosporium horrida Dudd.
- Monacrosporium indicum (Chowdhry & Bahl) Xing Z. Liu & K.Q. Zhang 1994
- Monacrosporium inquisitor Xing Z. Liu & K.Q. Zhang 1994
- Monacrosporium iridis (Ts. Watan.) A. Rubner & W. Gams 1996
- Monacrosporium janus S.D. Li & Xing Z. Liu 2003
- Monacrosporium leporinum Bubák 1906
- Monacrosporium leptosporum (Drechsler) A. Rubner 1996
- Monacrosporium longiphorum Xing Z. Liu & B.S. Lu 1993
- Monacrosporium megalosporum (Drechsler) Subram. 1964
- Monacrosporium megasporum Boedijn 1929
- Monacrosporium microscaphoides Xing Z. Liu & B.S. Lu 1993
- Monacrosporium multiforme (Dowsett, J. Reid & Kalkat) A. Rubner 1996
- Monacrosporium multiseptatum H.Y. Su & K.Q. Zhang 2005
- Monacrosporium mutabile R.C. Cooke 1969
- Monacrosporium obtrulloides Castaner 1968
- Monacrosporium ovatum Petch 1922
- Monacrosporium polybrochum (Drechsler) Subram. 1977
- Monacrosporium psychrophilum Drechsler) R.C. Cooke & C.H. Dickinson 1965
- Monacrosporium reticulatum (Peach) R.C. Cooke & C.H. Dickinson 1965
- Monacrosporium rutgeriense R.C. Cooke & Pramer 1968
- Monacrosporium salinum R.C. Cooke & C.H. Dickinson 1965
- Monacrosporium sarcopodioides (Harz) Berl. & Voglino 1886
- Monacrosporium sclerohypha (Drechsler) Xing Z. Liu & K.Q. Zhang 1994
- Monacrosporium sinense Xing Z. Liu & K.Q. Zhang 1994
- Monacrosporium sphaeroides Castaner 1968
- Monacrosporium stenobrochum Drechsler) Subram. 1964
- Monacrosporium subtile Oudem. 1885
- Monacrosporium synnematum Matsush. 1995
- Monacrosporium tedeschii A. Agostini 1933
- Monacrosporium tentaculatum A. Rubner & W. Gams 1996
- Monacrosporium thaumasium (Drechsler) de Hoog & Oorschot 1985
- Monacrosporium turkmenicum (Soprunov) R.C. Cooke & C.H. Dickinson 1965
- Monacrosporium ullum D.G. Kim, Ryu & H.G. Hwang 2006
- Monacrosporium yunnanense K.Q. Zhang, Xing Z. Liu & L. Cao 1996
- Monacrosporium ziziphi Bacc. 1917
