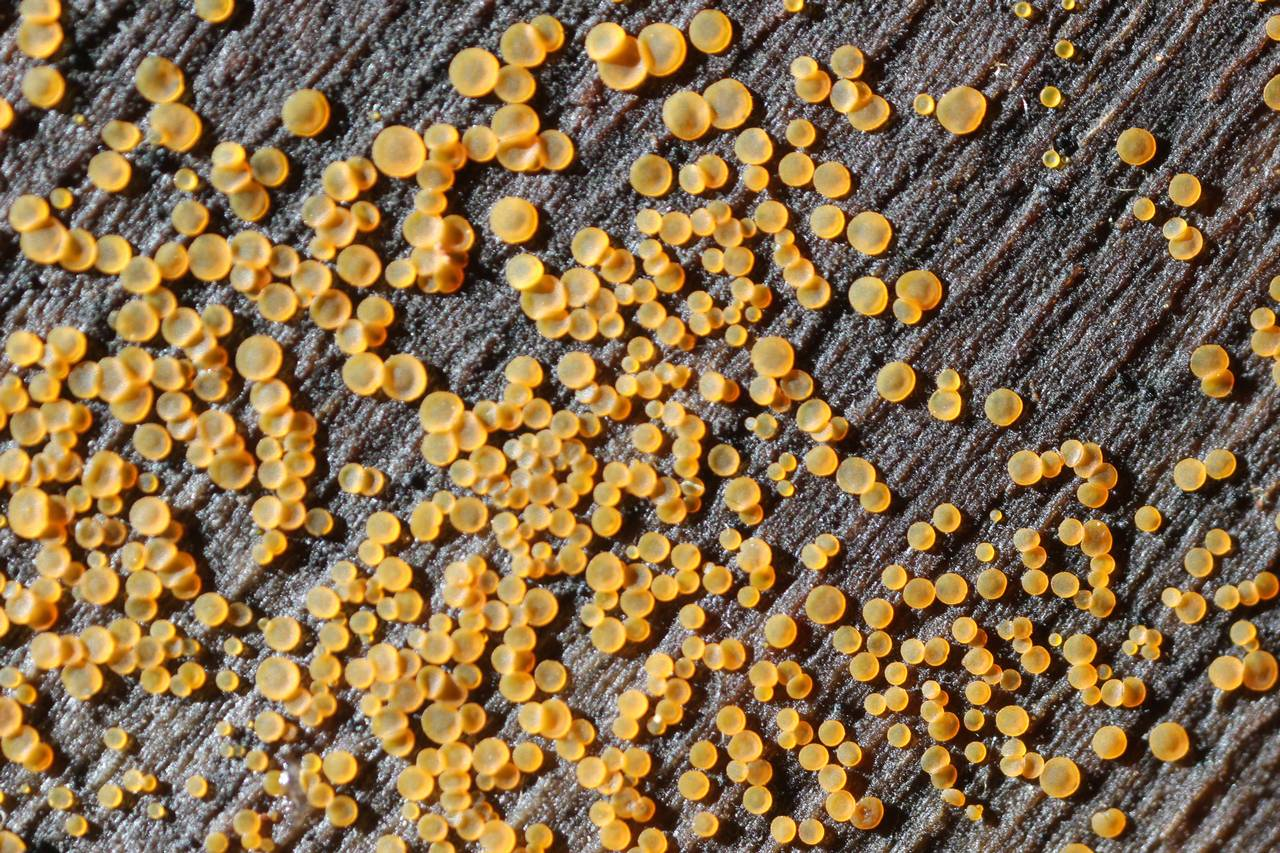
- Orbilia xanthostigma

Scientific classification
- Kingdom: Fungi
- Division: Ascomycota
- Subdivision: Pezizomycotina
- Class: Orbiliomycetes; O.E. Erikss. & Baral
- Order: Orbiliales; Baral, O.E. Erikss., G. Marson & E. Weber
- Family: Orbiliaceae; Nannf. (1932)

Type genus
- Orbilia Fr. (1836)

Genera
- Arthrobotrys; Brachyphoris; Dactylella; Dactylellina; Dicranidion; Duddingtonia; Dwayaangam; Gamsylella; Hyalorbilia; Monacrosporium; Orbilia; Pseudorbilia

= Orbiliaceae =

Family of fungi

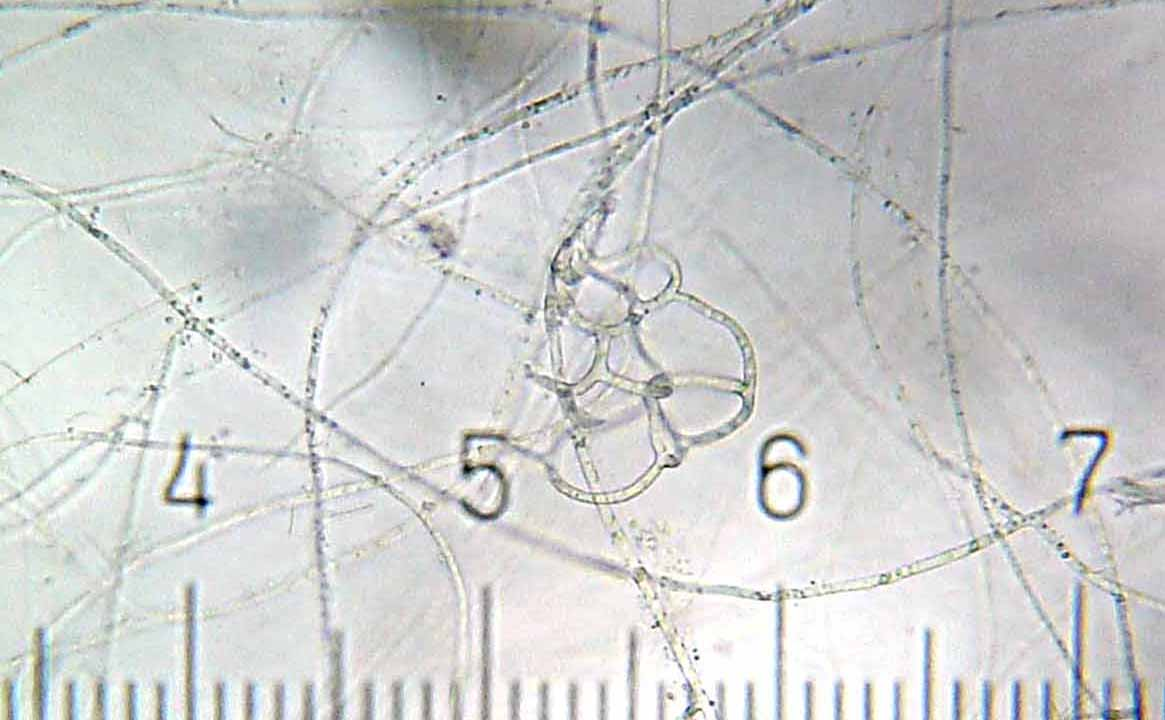
A fungus of the genus Arthrobotrys, showing adhesive nets that it uses to trap nematodes. Numbered ticks are 122 μm apart.

The Orbiliaceae are a family of saprobic sac fungi. It is the only family in the monotypic class Orbiliomycetes and the monotypic order Orbiliales. The family was first described by John Axel Nannfeldt in 1932 and now contains 288 species in 12 genera. Members of this family have a widespread distribution, but are more prevalent in temperate regions. Some species in the Orbiliaceae are carnivorous fungi, and have evolved a number of specialized mechanisms to trap nematodes.

== Description ==
Orbiliaceae do not have stromata, dense structural tissue that produces fruit bodies. They have small disc-shaped apothecia, that are typically convex, brightly colored or translucent. Their ascospores are small (typically less than 10 x 1 μm), hyaline, and have an oval or ellipsoidal shape. Species are usually found in wood on both wet and dry habitats. Anamorph species are hyphomycetous.

== Nematophagy ==
This family is well known for its many nematophagous species. Shortly after coming into contact with its prey, fungal mycelia penetrate the nematode and spontaneously differentiate into functional structures, known as traps, which will ultimately digest the nematode's internal contents. There are 5 types of trap mechanisms recognized in this family:

- Adhesive network: the most common trap, formed by hyphal outgrowths that recurve into themselves to form nematode-trapping loops.
- Adhesive knob: a roughly spherical cell, attached to the hyphae either directly or on an erect stalk. Adhesive knobs are typically closely spaced along a section of hyphae.
- Nonconstricting rings: always found with the adhesive network traps, and formed from thickening hyphae that curve and fuse to the supporting stalk.
- Adhesive column: a layer of cells on a hyphae with an adhesive surface.
- Constricting rings: these are rings of hyphae that swell rapidly inwards upon contact with the nematode, quickly (in 1–2 seconds) "lassoing" the victim.

== Genera ==
According to the most recent classification of Ascomycota, the Orbiliaceae contain only two (teleomorph) genera, the Hyalorbilia and the Orbilia. Hyalorbilia is distinguished from Orbilia by having asci without a stalk that arise from croziers, a hemispherical to broadly conical, thin-walled apex, asci and paraphyses in a gelatinous matrix, and an ectal excipulum (the outer surface of a cup-like apothecium) of horizontal textura prismatica.

Anamorph genera of the Orbiliaceae include Anguillospora, Arthrobotrys, Dactylella, Dactylellina, Dicranidion, Drechslerella, Helicoön, Monacrosporium, and Trinacrium. It has been suggested that the anamorph specialization illustrates convergent evolution occurring among mycelial fungi in aquatic and low-nitrogen habitats. This hypothesis has been borne out by recent phylogenetic and morphological studies.

In 2007, a new species was described from southwestern China with morphological features intermediate between Orbilia and Hyalorbilia. This species, named Pseudorbilia bipolaris Y. Zhang, Z.F. Yu, H.O. Baral & K.Q. Zhang, was placed into its own genus in the Orbiliaceae to accommodate its distinctive features.
