= Alonzo K. Vickers =

American judge

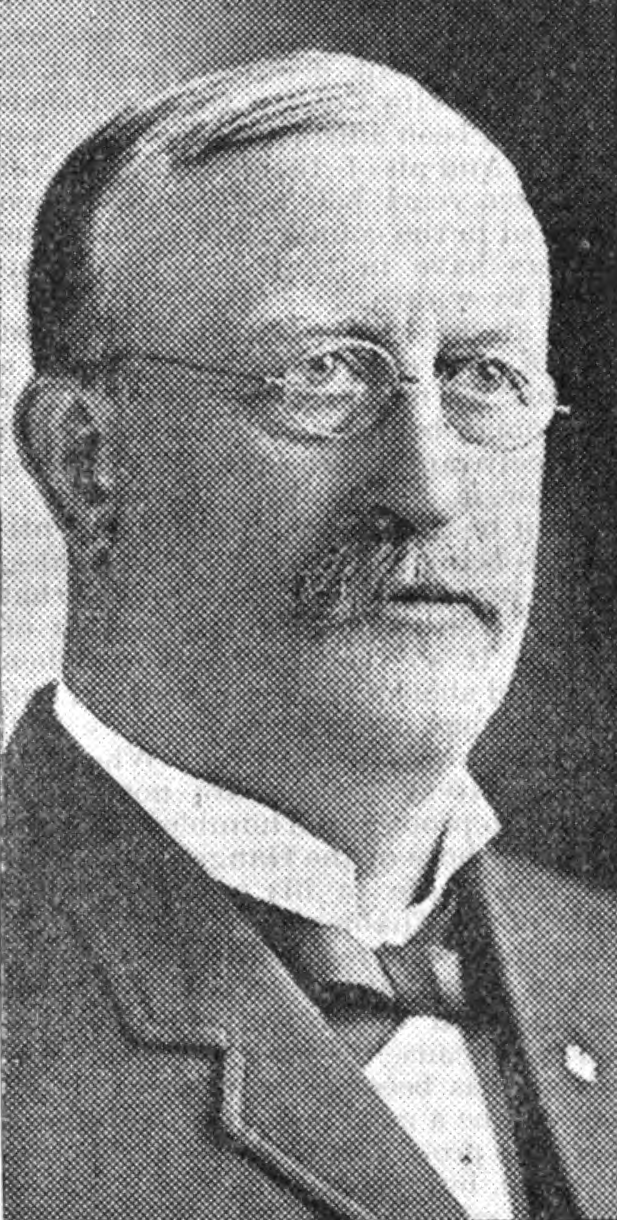

Justice of the Supreme Court of Illinois
- In office 1906–1915
- Preceded by: Carroll C. Boggs
- Succeeded by: Albert Watson

Member of the Illinois House of Representatives from the 41st district
- In office 1866 – 1868

Personal details
- Born: September 25, 1853 Massac County, Illinois
- Died: January 21, 1915 (aged 61)
- Party: Republican
- Profession: Attorney

Alonzo Knox Vickers (September 25, 1853 – January 21, 1915) was an American politician and jurist from Illinois. Vickers received a basic public education and assisted on the family farm as a youth. He later taught in schools and studied law in Metropolis, Illinois. Upon admission to the bar, Vickers practiced in and around Vienna, Illinois, also serving as that city's attorney. He served one term in the Illinois House of Representatives from 1886 to 1888. In 1891, he was elected to the 1st Illinois circuit court, practicing there for eleven years until elevation to the Illinois Appellate Court. In 1906, Vickers was elected to the Supreme Court of Illinois. He died before completing his nine-year term.

== Biography ==
Vickers was born on September 25, 1853, in Massac County, Illinois. He was raised on the family farm and attended public school. He later attended a school in Metropolis, Illinois, then taught in county schools. While teaching, Vickers studied law under R. W. McCartney and was admitted to the bar in 1882. He established a practice in small Vienna, Illinois, and edited a paper there. After a brief junior partnership with a Judge Spann, Vickers founded a practice with George B. Gillespie. Vickers & Gillespie practiced until 1890.

Vickers served as city attorney of Vienna. In 1886, he was elected as a Republican to the Illinois House of Representatives, serving one two-year term. In 1891, Vickers was elected to the 1st Illinois circuit court. He would hold this position for the next eleven years, succeeding in two re-election bids. In 1903, the Supreme Court of Illinois named Vickers to the 2nd district of the Illinois Appellate Court. In 1906, Vickers was elected to the Supreme Court, replacing Carroll C. Boggs. He served as chief justice in 1910. Vickers died on January 21, 1915, before his nine-year term was complete.

Vickers married and had a son and two daughters. Vickers was a member of the Benevolent and Protective Order of Elks, Knights of Pythias, Independent Order of Odd Fellows, and was a Freemason. He was buried in Vienna Fraternal Cemetery in Vienna.
