= 2018 Illinois judicial elections =

- November 6, 2018

The 2018 Illinois judicial elections consisted of both partisan and retention elections, including those for one seat on the Supreme Court of Illinois and five seats in the Illinois Appellate Court. Primary elections were held on March 20, 2018, and general elections were held on November 6, 2018. These elections were part of the 2018 Illinois elections.

== Supreme Court of Illinois ==
Justices of the Supreme Court of Illinois are elected by district. One seat held a retention election.

The court has seven seats total separated into five districts. The first district, representing Cook County, contains three seats, making it a multi-member district, while other four districts are single-member districts. Justices hold ten year terms.

=== Retention elections ===
To be retained, judges were required to have 60% of their vote be "yes".

District	Incumbent				Vote		Cite
District	Party	Name	In office since	Previous years elected/retained	Yes (Retain)	No (Remove)	Cite
1st	Democratic	Anne M. Burke	July 6, 2006	2008 (elected)	1,106,59 (81.1%)	258,253 (18.9%)	

== Illinois Appellate Court ==
Illinois Appellate Court justices hold ten-year terms.

=== 4th district (Appleton vacancy) ===
Incumbent Peter C. Cavanagh, who was appointed in May 2017 to fill the vacancy left when Tom Appleton resigned his seat, won reelection. This was a special election for two years, as Appeton's term would have ended in 2020.

==== Democratic primary ====
No Democratic primary was held, as no candidates filed to run.

==== Republican primary ====
Due to the time the vacancy was created being so close to the May 6 filing date for candidates to make the ballot, Cavanaugh was not on the ballot, and instead ran as a write-in candidate.

Illinois Appellate Court 4th district (Appleton vacancy) Republican primary
Party	Candidate	Votes	%
Write-in	Pete Cavanaugh (incumbent)	9,910	99.78
Write-in	Timothy Forman	22	0.22
Total votes		9,932	100

==== General election ====
Illinois Appellate Court 4th district (Appleton vacancy) election
Party	Candidate	Votes	%
Republican	Pete Cavanaugh (incumbent)	377,400	100
Total votes		377,400	100

=== 4th district (Pope vacancy) ===
Incumbent Republican Thomas M. Harris, Jr., who was appointed in July 2017 to fill the vacancy left when Carole Pope resigned her seat, won reelection, running unopposed in both Republican primary and general election. This was a special election for four years, as Pope's term would have ended in 2022.

==== Democratic primary ====
No Democratic primary was held, as no candidates filed to run.

==== Republican primary ====
Illinois Appellate Court 4th district (Pope vacancy) Republican primary
Party	Candidate	Votes	%
Republican	Thomas M. Harris, Jr. (incumbent)	101,530	100
Total votes		101,530	100

==== General election ====
Illinois Appellate Court 4th district (Pope vacancy) election
Party	Candidate	Votes	%
Republican	Thomas M. Harris, Jr. (incumbent)	377,404	100
Total votes		377,404	100

=== 5th district ===
Republican David K. Overstreet was elected to fill the vacancy that was created after Richard P. Goldenhersh retired in 2017. This was a regular election, as Goldenhersh's term would have expired in 2018.

==== Democratic primary ====
Illinois Appellate Court 5th district Democratic primary
Party	Candidate	Votes	%
Democratic	Kevin T. Hoerner	69,967	100
Total votes		69,967	100

==== Republican primary ====
Illinois Appellate Court 5th district Republican primary
Party	Candidate	Votes	%
Republican	David K. Overstreet	84,744	100
Total votes		84,744	100

==== General election ====
Illinois Appellate Court 5th district election
Party	Candidate	Votes	%
Republican	David K. Overstreet	281,846	58.77
Democratic	Kevin T. Hoerner	197,723	41.23
Total votes		479,569	100

=== Retention elections ===
To be retained, judges were required to have 60% of their vote be "yes".

District	Incumbent				Vote		Cite
District	Party	Name	In office since	Previous years elected/retained	Yes (Retain)	No (Remove)	Cite
1st	Democratic	Margaret Stanton McBride	December 7, 1998	1998 (elected), 2008 (retained)	1,067,004 (81.1%)	248,831 (18.9%)	
2nd	Republican	Robert McLaren	December 5, 1988	1988 (elected), 1998, 2008 (retained)	782,693 (79.3%)	203,831 (20.7%)	

== Lower courts ==
Lower courts also saw judicial elections. This included 52 partisan elections to fill vacancies on circuit courts and 34 partisan elections to fill vacancies on subcircuit courts.
