= Mary Ann McMorrow =

American judge (1930–2013)

Chief Justice Mary Ann McMorrow
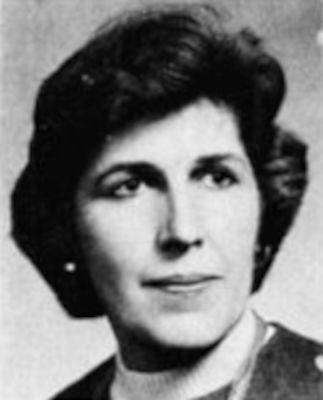
- McMorrow's official photograph, c. 1987.
- Born: Mary Ann Grohwin; January 16, 1930; Chicago, U.S.
- Died: February 23, 2013 (aged 83)
- Education: Rosary College | Loyola University Chicago School of Law (JD)
- Occupation: Illinois Supreme Court Chief Justice
- Years active: 2002-2006
- Predecessor: Justice Moses W. Harrison II
- Successor: Chief Justice Robert Thomas
- Political party: Democratic
- Spouse: Emmett McMorrow
- Children: Mary Ann

Mary Ann McMorrow (née Grohwin; January 16, 1930 – February 23, 2013) served as the first woman Illinois Supreme Court Chief Justice from 2002-2006. McMorrow is notable for additionally serving as the first woman Justice on the Illinois Supreme Court, and for being the first woman to lead any of the three branches of government in the state of Illinois. She served as the twenty-sixth woman State Supreme Court Chief Justice in the nation.

== Early life ==
Mary Ann Grohwin was born to Roman, a meat wholesaler, and Emily Grohwin and grew up in a Polish-American Roman Catholic household on the northwest side of Chicago. She had two siblings, an older brother and a younger sister.

== Education ==
McMorrow's parents encouraged her and her two siblings to attend college because of the value her parents saw in education. She attended Rosary College, now known as Dominican University, and graduated in 1950. McMorrow's mother urged McMorrow to consider attending law school. McMorrow was initially wary because it was highly uncommon for women to attend and because many law schools would not accept women. After receiving her undergraduate degree, McMorrow applied to and was accepted to Loyola University Chicago School of Law. While at Loyola University Chicago School of Law, McMorrow worked as an associate editor for the Loyola Law Review, and her all-male graduating class elected her as class president. She graduated in 1953, being the only woman in her graduating class, and was soon after admitted to the Illinois bar.

== Early career ==
=== Prosecutor ===
McMorrow started her legal career at the law firm of Riordan & Linklater. In 1955, she worked at the Assistant State's Attorney of Cook County, assigned to the Criminal Division, and was the first woman to prosecute major felony cases in Cook County.

While working at the State's Attorney, McMorrow was provided with the opportunity to argue a case before the Supreme Court of Illinois. Two days before arguing before the Court, McMorrow's boss prohibited her from going because she was a woman. Years later, McMorrow reveled in the fact that she sat on the very bench that she was once not allowed to argue before. She has expressed that excluding women from arguing before the State Supreme Courts is a waste of valuable talent.

=== Path to the Circuit Court of Cook County and the First District Appellate Court ===
McMorrow was encouraged by her coworkers at the State's Attorney to run for a position on the Circuit Court of Cook County. She was initially unsure about running because of her lack of political experience at that time, but ran anyway. Voters elected McMorrow as a Judge of the Circuit Court of Cook County in 1976 after running as a democrat. Six years later, in 1982, voters retained McMorrow for a second term. The Supreme Court of Illinois appointed McMorrow to the Illinois Appellate Court in 1985 and elected to that court in 1986.

== Illinois Supreme Court ==
Illinois is one of eight states in the United States to elect their State Supreme Court justices through partisan election. In 1992, after defeating Robert C. Buckley, a Republican Appellate judge, and seven fellow Democratic primary candidates, voters elected McMorrow to the Supreme Court of Illinois. McMorrow became the first woman to serve as a Supreme Court Justice in the State's 173-year history. McMorrow succeeded Justice William G. Clark. McMorrow's win was notable considering women only made up around nine percent of the judiciary in the United States at that time.

During the election race, Buckley, McMorrow's Republican opponent, criticized McMorrow's comment that the Court needed the perspective of a woman. Buckley challenged McMorrow's objectivity, a common form of backlash targeted towards women judges, claiming the gender of a judge should have no impact in their decision. McMorrow did not believe a woman's perspective would drastically change the Court's opinion, but that it was different than a man's and important to represent on the Court. McMorrow did not think of herself as a woman in the law, but simply as a legal professional.

Voters retained McMorrow as an Illinois Supreme Court Justice in 2002.

=== Notable Opinions and Dissents ===
In 1995, McMorrow dissented from the Court's majority opinion in the case Charles vs. Seigfried, where the majority argued that individuals who sell or offer alcohol to minors are not legally liable for the injuries that were caused by the intoxicated minors. McMorrow argued that the no-liability decision was dangerous and unacceptable, relied on outdated precedents, and claimed that the decision would lead to preventable deaths and injuries of more minors, and that all Illinois citizens would be negatively impacted by this decision.

In 1997, McMorrow authored the opinion of Best v. Taylor Machine Works, which overturned a law that set a cap on how much an individual who was injured or died from a workplace accident was entitled to in monetary compensation.

In 2002, McMorrow authored the opinion of Happel v. Wal-Mart Stores, Inc., which made it mandatory for pharmacists to disclose any side effects that could come from taking prescribed medications.

=== Chief Justice ===
In May 2002, McMorrow's fellow Supreme Court Justices unanimously elected McMorrow as Chief Justice of the Supreme Court of Illinois, guaranteeing her position for a three-year term. She succeeded Justice Moses W. Harrison. After being elected Chief Justice, she became the first woman to head any of the three branches of Illinois state government.

=== Current Illinois Supreme Court ===
Since 2022, the bench on the Illinois Supreme Court has been held by a majority of women. Currently, four women serve as Illinois Supreme Court Justices, including Justice Lisa Holder White, Justice Joy V. Cunningham, Justice Elizabeth M. Rochford, and Justice Mary K. O'Brien.

== Awards ==
In 1991, McMorrow received the "Medal of Excellence" award from Loyola University Chicago School of Law's Alumni Association. She also received the Chicago Bar Association's Justice John Paul Stevens Award and the 1996 "The Fellows of the Illinois Bar Foundation award for Distinguished Service to Law and Society."

In 1993, the Catholic Lawyers' Guild named McMorrow the "Lawyer of the Year." In 2003, the magazine, Chicago Lawyer, named McMorrow "Person of the Year."

The Women's Bar Association of Illinois awarded McMorrow with the "Myra Bradwell Woman of Achievement Award" in 1998, which is the association's most prestigious award. That same year, the law fraternity, Phi Alpha Delta, awarded McMorrow with the "Barbara Jordan Outstanding Public Service Award."

McMorrow received the "Freedom Award" from the John Marshall Law School in 2000. The following year, in 2001, the National Association of Women Lawyers awarded McMorrow with the "Arabella Babb Mansfield Award."

In 2005, the American Bar Association awarded McMorrow with the Margaret Brent Award for her professional expertise in the legal field and for being a positive role model for future lawyers.

In 2007, The Lincoln Academy of Illinois inducted McMorrow as a Laureate. That same year, the Governor of Illinois, Rod Blagojevich, awarded her the Order of Lincoln, the State’s highest honor in the area of Government and Law.

== Retirement ==
Chief Justice McMorrow retired from the bench on July 5, 2006. Chief Justice Robert Thomas succeeded her. Over the course of her career as an Illinois Supreme Court Justice, McMorrow authored 225 majority opinions.

== Professional associations ==
Chief Justice McMorrow served as a member of the:

- Illinois State Bar Association and Chicago Bar Associations
- Women's Bar Association of Illinois (President from 1974-1975)
- American Inns of Court (Master Bencher)
- American Judicature Society
- National Association of Women Judges
- Illinois Judges' Association (Board of Directors)

== Personal life ==
McMorrow married Emmett McMorrow, a Chicago Police lieutenant, in 1962. The two met during McMorrow's time working as a prosecutor. The couple had one daughter, Mary Ann.

== Death ==
Chief Justice McMorrow died on February 23, 2013, at Northwestern Memorial Hospital in Chicago, aged 83, from undisclosed causes.

== See also ==
- List of female state supreme court justices
