= John J. Stamos =

American judge (1924–2017)

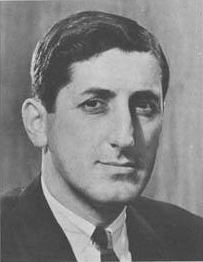
- official portrait, circa 1973

Justice of the Illinois Supreme Court
- In office 1988–1990
- Preceded by: Joseph F. Cunningham
- Succeeded by: Horace L. Calvo

Cook County State's Attorney
- In office 1966–1968
- Preceded by: Daniel P. Ward
- Succeeded by: Edward Hanrahan

Personal details
- Born: January 30, 1924 Chicago, Illinois, U.S.
- Died: January 28, 2017 (aged 92)
- Education: DePaul University (LLB)

Military service
- Branch/service: United States Army
- Battles/wars: World War II

John James Stamos (January 30, 1924 – January 28, 2017) was an American attorney and jurist who served as a justice of the Supreme Court of Illinois from 1988 to 1990, and as the Cook County State's Attorney from 1966 to 1968.

== Early life ==
Born in Chicago, Illinois to Greek immigrants from the Kiato region of Corinthia, Stamos served in the U.S. Army Medical Corps during World War II, from 1943 to 1945, in the European theater of operations. He initially did clerical work at a military psychiatric facility in Belgium, but when the hospital began treating wounded soldiers following the Battle of the Bulge, he became a litter-bearer.

== Career ==
After the war, Stamos received an LL.B. from DePaul University College of Law in 1948, and was admitted to the Illinois Bar in 1949. He then served as assistant corporation counsel for the city of Chicago, assistant state's attorney for Cook County, and chief of the Criminal Division of the Cook County state's attorney office. In 1966, Stamos, then the first assistant state's attorney, was appointed Cook County State's Attorney after predecessor Dan Ward was appointed to the Illinois Supreme Court. While Stamos was in this office, Cook County tried mass murderer Richard Speck, although Stamos did not consider prosecuting the case personally. Stamos was not slated for reelection to the job in 1968, as Mayor Richard J. Daley feared losing the office to a Republican candidate of Irish ancestry, Robert J. O'Rourke, and instead slated Edward Hanrahan, who went on to win the election.

As he was not slated to run for his position as a prosecutor in 1968, Stamos instead successfully sought election to the first district appellate court in that year. He served in that position until his appointment to the Illinois supreme court in 1988, to fill the vacancy created by the retirement of Seymour Simon. Once, while serving, he received a letter from a fan of the actor, John Stamos, asking for a picture. He replied by sending a photograph of himself in his judicial robes.

== Personal life ==
Stamos was married twice, the first time to Helen Voutiritsas, who died from breast cancer in 1981. They had four children. He remarried in 1986. Stamos died of pulmonary fibrosis within hours of a dinner to celebrate his coming 93rd birthday. He was buried at Memorial Park Cemetery in Skokie, Illinois.
