= Ruth May Tunnicliff =

American physician

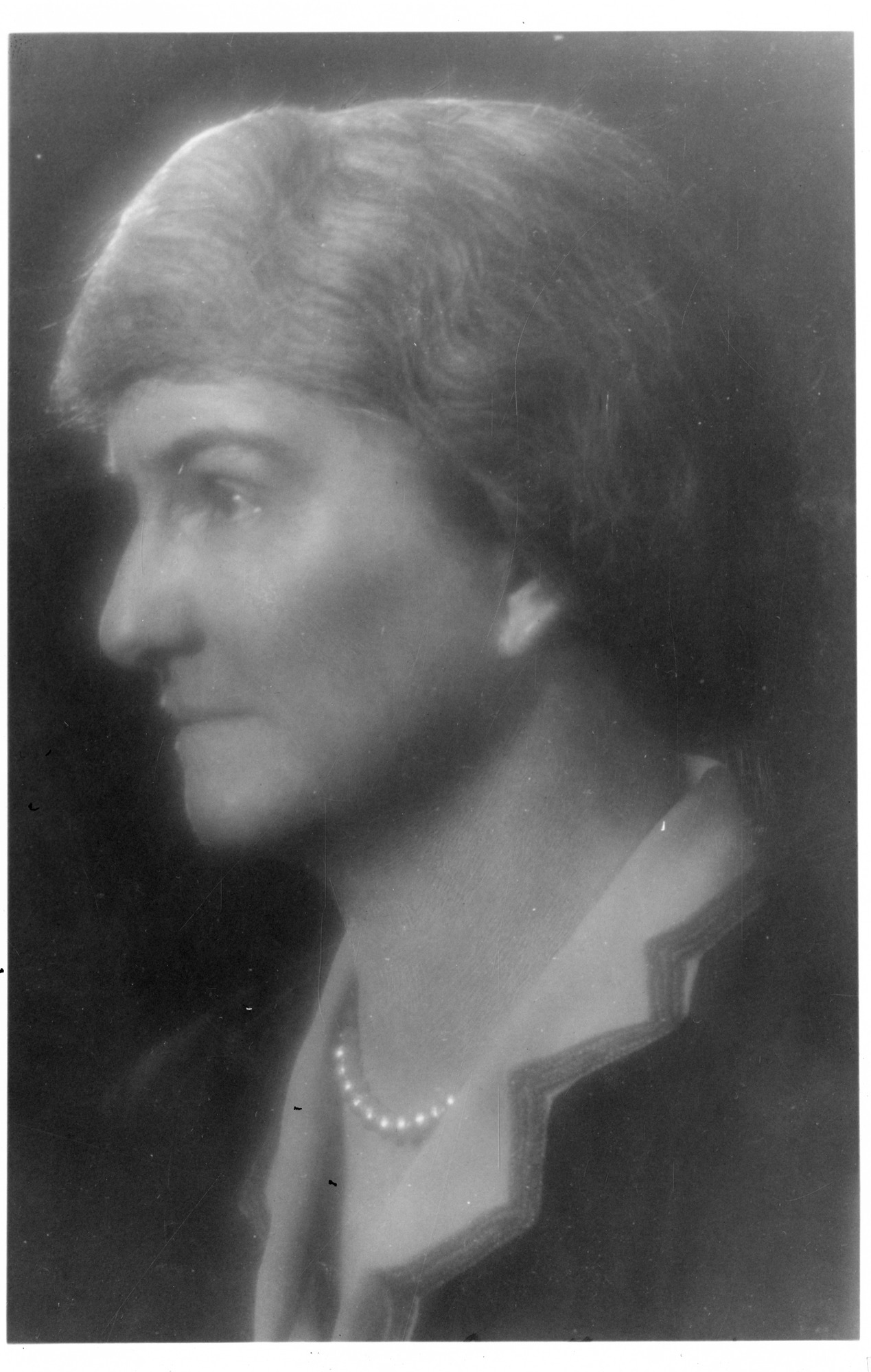
- Ruth May Tunnicliff, from the Smithsonian Institution Archives
- Born: May 1, 1876; Macomb, Illinois, US
- Died: September 22, 1946 (aged 70); Chicago, Illinois, US
- Occupations: Physician, pathologist
- Relatives: Helen Tunnicliff Catterall (sister); Sarah Bacon Tunnicliff (sister); Ralph T. Catterall (nephew)

Ruth May Tunnicliff (May 1, 1876 – September 22, 1946) was an American physician, medical researcher, bacteriologist, and pathologist, based in Chicago. She developed a serum against measles, and did laboratory research for the United States Army during the 1918 influenza pandemic.

== Early life ==
Ruth May Tunnicliff was born in Macomb, Illinois, the youngest child of judge Damon G. Tunnicliff and his second wife, Sarah Alice Bacon Tunnicliffe. Her older sisters were legal historian Helen Tunnicliff Catterall and Chicago clubwoman Sarah Bacon Tunnicliff. All three sisters graduated from Vassar College. Ruth Tunnicliff pursued further studies at the University of Chicago and at the Women's Medical College at Northwestern University, before earning her medical degree at Rush Medical College in 1903, in the first class of women graduates from that program. She lived at Hull House for a stint as a young woman.

== Career ==
Tunnicliff was a research bacteriologist at the John McCormick Memorial Institute for Infectious Diseases. She co-authored a book on gangrene, Noma: Gangrenous stomatitis, water cancer, scorbutic cancer, gangrena oris, gangrene of the mouth (1907). She is best known for developing Tunnicliff's serum, which could prevent the measles if given soon after exposure.

During World War I, she held the title "Contract Surgeon" with the United States Army, and worked at Camp Pike in Little Rock, Arkansas, and Camp George Meade in Maryland, during the 1918 influenza pandemic. Later in her career she worked on dental topics with Carolyn Hammond of the Chicago Dental Infirmary. She served a term as president of the Chicago Society of Pathologists.

Tunnicliff published her research on measles, rubella, scarlet fever, influenza, and other topics in The Journal of the American Medical Association The New England Journal of Medicine, Experimental Biology and Medicine, and The Journal of Infectious Diseases.

== Personal life ==
Tunnicliff lived in Chicago with her sister Sarah and their mother. Their mother died in 1936. Ruth Tunnicliff died in 1946, aged 70 years, in Chicago. In 2015, she was one of the women honored by the McDonough County Women's Social Service Memorial, Facing the Storm, a bronze statue in Macomb, Illinois.
