= Sarah Bacon Tunnicliff =

American clubwoman

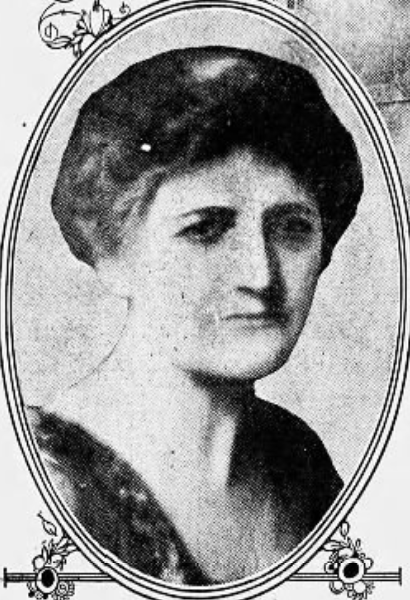
- Sarah Bacon Tunnicliff, from a 1925 newspaper
- Born: August 16, 1872; Macomb, Illinois
- Died: March 18, 1957 (aged 84); Bristol, New Hampshire
- Occupation: Clubwoman
- Parent: Damon G. Tunnicliff
- Relatives: Helen Tunnicliff Catterall (sister); Ralph T. Catterall (nephew)

Sarah Bacon Tunnicliff (August 16, 1872 – March 18, 1957) was an American clubwoman based in Chicago. She was director of the Woman's City Club of Chicago, and active in efforts to reduce air pollution in the city in the 1910s and 1920s.

== Early life ==
Sarah Bacon Tunnicliff was born in Macomb, Illinois, the daughter of judge Damon G. Tunnicliff and his second wife, Sarah Alice Bacon Tunnicliff. She graduated from Vassar College in 1892. Her older sister Helen Tunnicliff Catterall, also a Vassar alumna, was a writer and a lawyer. Her younger sister Ruth May Tunnicliff, also a Vassar alumna, was a physician and bacteriologist.

== Career ==
Tunnicliff was a director of the Woman's City Club of Chicago. She chaired the club's Clean Air Committee, which worked for improved building codes, especially smoke, noise and ventilation standards, in Chicago buildings. She was the Illinois director of education for the United States Fuel Administration, and director of the fuel conservation department of the Illinois women's committee of the Council of National Defense, both during World War I. In this work, she carried a badge, wrote articles about air pollution, prepared posters for public education, and encouraged urban households to manage their coal furnaces without unnecessary smoke.

Tunnicliff was also active in the Chicago Woman's Club, the Chicago Association of College Alumnae, and the Renaissance Society of the University of Chicago.

== Personal life ==
Sarah and Ruth Tunnicliff lived with their widowed mother in Chicago until her death in 1936, and stayed together until Ruth's death in 1946. Sarah Tunnicliff died in 1957, aged 84 years, in Bristol, New Hampshire, where she spent summers in her later years.
