= Shope =

Shope may refer to:

== People ==
- Gertrude Shope (1925–2025), a South African trade unionist and politician
- Richard Shope (1901–66), an American virologist
- Robert Shope (1929–2004), an American virologist
- Simeon P. Shope (1837–1920), an American politician
- T. J. Shope (born 1985), an American politician

== Other uses ==
- Shope papilloma virus, a virus that causes cancer in rabbits
- Shopi, a group of people in the Balkans
- USS Samaritan (AH-10), a ship also known as SS Shope
- Jennifer Shope, a character in the Canadian animated TV series Supernoobs
