= Philip J. Rarick =

American judge (born 1940)

Philip Joseph Rarick (born November 10, 1940) was a justice of the Illinois Supreme Court from 2002 to 2004.

Philip J. Rarick was born Nov. 10, 1940, in Collinsville, Illinois. He received his bachelor of arts degree from Southern Illinois University and his law degree from Saint Louis University School of Law. He entered private practice in Collinsville, Illinois in 1966 with the City of Collinsville, Collinsville Township, and Jarvis Township as clients. He also worked for a time as an assistant state's attorney for Madison County.

He became a judge of the Illinois Third Judicial Circuit in 1975. In 1988, he was elected to the Illinois Appellate Court for the Fifth District. In September 2002, the Illinois Supreme Court appointed Rarick to take Justice Moses Harrison's seat on that court upon the latter's retirement. Although he was expected to run for election to a full term in 2004, Rarick suffered a stroke in January 2003, and announced in September 2003 that he would not run for the seat.

Political offices
Preceded by Moses Harrison	Justice of the Illinois Supreme Court; 2002–2004	Succeeded by Lloyd A. Karmeier
