= Anne M. Burke =

American judge (born 1944)

Anne Burke

Chief Justice of the Illinois Supreme Court
- In office October 25, 2019 – October 20, 2022
- Preceded by: Lloyd A. Karmeier
- Succeeded by: Mary Jane Theis

Justice of the Illinois Supreme Court
- In office July 6, 2006 – November 30, 2022
- Preceded by: Mary Ann McMorrow
- Succeeded by: Joy Cunningham

Personal details
- Born: Anne Marie McGlone; February 3, 1944 (age 82) Chicago, Illinois, U.S.
- Party: Democratic
- Spouse: Edward M. Burke
- Education: DePaul University (BA); Illinois Institute of Technology (JD)

Anne Marie Burke (née McGlone; born February 3, 1944) is an American jurist who served on the Illinois Supreme Court from 2006 until 2022. She served a term as the chief justice from 2019 until 2022. Burke had previously been appointed to the Illinois Appellate Court in 1995 and was elected to that seat in 1996. Burke was a founder of the Special Olympics in 1968. She is married to former 14th Ward Chicago Alderman Edward M. Burke, who was convicted of racketeering, bribery, and extortion on December 21, 2023.

On September 12, 2022, Burke announced her intention to resign from the Illinois Supreme Court effective November 30, 2022.

== Early life, education and family ==
Born Anne Marie McGlone, she was raised on Chicago's South Side. She has two brothers and one sister. She graduated from Maria High School. In the late 1960s, she was working as a physical education teacher with the Chicago Park District when she began developing and advocating for the idea of holding a Special Olympics for developmental challenged children. Gaining support from eventual chair, Eunice Shriver and the Kennedy Foundation, the first Special Olympics was held at Soldier Field in Chicago in 1968.

While raising her own children, she returned to school. She received a Bachelor of Arts degree from DePaul University in 1976 and a Juris Doctor degree from Chicago-Kent College of Law in 1983.

== Career ==
Burke was admitted to the Illinois bar and federal Northern District of Illinois in 1983, and the U.S. Court of Appeals for the 7th Circuit in 1985. She was certified for the Northern District's trial bar in 1987. In 1987, Illinois Governor James R. Thompson appointed her a judge of the Illinois Court of Claims, and she was reappointed by Governor Jim Edgar in 1991. Burke was the first woman to serve on the Illinois Court of Claims. In April 1994, she was appointed special counsel to the Governor for Child Welfare Services. In August 1995, she was appointed to the Appellate Court, First District, and was subsequently elected to that office in 1996. Upon the retirement of Justice Mary Ann McMorrow in 2006, Burke was appointed to the Illinois Supreme Court. She was elected to a full ten-year term in November 2008. She won another ten-year term in her November 2018 retention election.

Burke served on the National Review Board for the Protection of Children and Young People (NRB), appointed by the United States Conference of Catholic Bishops (USCCB) of the U.S. Roman Catholic Church. She was interim chair from 2002 to 2004, and was instrumental in conducting the surveys and studies that supported the John Jay Report.

== Personal life ==
Along with others including Eunice Kennedy, Burke is a founder of the Special Olympics.

Burke chaired the lay National Review Board of the U.S. Conference of Catholic Bishops which investigates accusations of clerical sexual abuse in the Roman Catholic church. She is a Dame of Malta, a Roman Catholic lay religious order.

Anne Burke is married to Alderman Edward M. Burke from the 14th Ward of the Chicago City Council and Chairman of the Committee on Finance. Anne and Edward and his brother Daniel, a member of the Illinois House of Representatives, were named one of Illinois' most influential families by Crain's Chicago Business in 2005.

Initially, the Burkes had four children: Jennifer, Edward Jr., Sarah, and Emmett (1973–2004) They have nine grandchildren.

Legal offices
Preceded by Mary Ann McMorrow	Justice of the Illinois Supreme Court; 2006–2022	Succeeded by Joy Cunningham
Preceded by Lloyd A. Karmeier	Chief Justice of the Illinois Supreme Court; 2019–2022	Succeeded by Mary Jane Theis
