= Daniel P. Ward =

American judge (1918-1995)

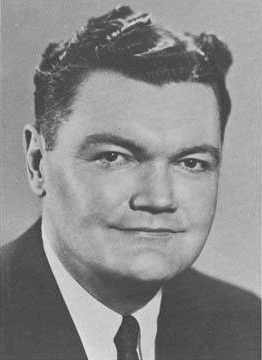
- official portrait, circa 1973

Chief Justice of the Illinois Supreme Court
- In office 1976–1979

Justice of the Illinois Supreme Court
- In office 1966–1991

Cook County State's Attorney
- In office 1960–1966
- Preceded by: Ben Adamowski
- Succeeded by: John J. Stamos

Personal details
- Born: August 30, 1918
- Died: April 23, 1995 (age 76) Maywood, Illinois
- Party: Democratic
- Education: St. Viator College; DePaul University College of Law

Military service
- Branch/service: United States Army
- Battles/wars: World War II

Daniel Patrick Ward (August 30, 1918 – April 23, 1995) was an American jurist.

Born in Chicago, Illinois, Ward graduated from Marmion Academy in Aurora, Illinois. He went to St. Viator College and then received his law degree from DePaul University College of Law. During World War II, Ward served in the United States Army. He was a professor of law at Southeastern University and was an assistant United States Attorney. He was also a professor of law at DePaul University College of Law. From 1960 to 1966, Ward was state's attorney for Cook County, Illinois and was a Democrat. Ward then served on the Illinois Supreme Court from 1966 until 1991 and was chief justice of the court from 1976 to 1979. He lived in Westchester, Illinois. Ward died in Maywood, Illinois.
