= Helen Tunnicliff Catterall =

American lawyer

- Born: Helen Honor Tunnicliff; March 3, 1870; Macomb, Illinois, U.S.
- Died: November 10, 1933 (aged 63); Richmond, Virginia, U.S.
- Education: Vassar College; University of Chicago
- Occupations: Lawyer, writer, historian
- Children: Ralph T. Catterall
- Parent: Damon G. Tunnicliff
- Relatives: Sarah Bacon Tunnicliff (sister)

Helen Tunnicliff Catterall (March 3, 1870 – November 10, 1933) was an American lawyer, writer, and historian, based in Chicago. She is best known for her five-volume Judicial Cases Concerning American Slavery and the Negro, published between 1926 and 1937.

== Early life ==
Helen Honor Tunnicliff was born in Macomb, Illinois, the daughter of judge Damon G. Tunnicliff and his second wife, Sarah Alice Bacon Tunnicliff. She graduated from Vassar College in 1889, and gave an address at commencement on "The New Astronomy." After Vassar, Tunnicliff earned a law degree and pursued further studies in political science at the University of Chicago.

Her younger sisters also graduated from Vassar. Sarah Bacon Tunnicliff (1872–1957) was a director of the Woman's City Club of Chicago and a social reformer, and Ruth May Tunnicliff (1876–1946) became a medical researcher and president of the Chicago Society of Pathologists.

== Career ==
Tunnicliff practiced law in Massachusetts and Illinois, and taught at Cornell University. She was also director of a children's home in Ithaca. She is best known as main author of the five-volume Judicial Cases Concerning American Slavery and the Negro (1926–1937), written with support from the Carnegie Foundation. Her work remains a useful source on the legal history of slavery in the United States, and is still referenced in controversies on the subject, almost a century after its publication.

== Personal life ==
In 1896, Helen Tunnicliff married English-born historian Ralph Charles Henry Catterall (1866–1914). They had a son, Ralph Tunnicliff Catterall (1897–1978), who followed his mother into a law career. Helen Tunnicliff Catterall died in 1933, aged 63 years, in Richmond, Virginia, where her son lived. Her papers are archived at the University of Chicago Library.
