= Joseph N. Carter =

American judge

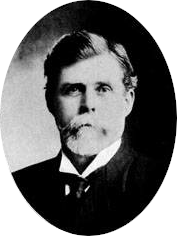

Justice of the Supreme Court of Illinois
- In office 1894–1903
- Preceded by: Simeon P. Shope
- Succeeded by: Guy C. Scott

Member of the Illinois House of Representatives from the 37th district
- In office 1878 – 1882

Personal details
- Born: March 12, 1843 Hardin County, Kentucky
- Died: February 6, 1913 (aged 69) Quincy, Illinois
- Party: Republican
- Spouse: Ellen Barrell
- Education: University of Michigan
- Profession: Attorney

Joseph Newton Carter (March 12, 1843 – February 6, 1913) was an American attorney and politician from Kentucky, United States. He spent most of his life in Quincy, Illinois, where he was a partner in a successful law practice. Carter was elected to two terms in the Illinois House of Representatives starting in 1878. He was elected to the Supreme Court of Illinois in 1894, serving one nine-year term.

== Biography ==
Joseph Newton Carter was born in Hardin County, Kentucky on March 12, 1843. He attended public schools and assisted on the family farm. In 1857, his family moved with him to Charleston, Illinois, then to Douglas County the following year. Upon graduating from school, he taught at another school. He served a three-month stint with the 70th Illinois Volunteer Infantry Regiment in the Civil War. In 1863, he was accepted at Illinois College in Jacksonville, Illinois, graduating there years later. He then studied law at the University of Michigan Law School in Ann Arbor, Michigan, graduating in 1868.

Carter returned to Illinois in July 1869, settling in Quincy. There, he was admitted to the bar and established a law practice with William H. Govert. In 1878, he was elected as a Republican to the Illinois House of Representatives for the 37th district. He was re-elected in 1880 to another two-year term. In 1882, he ran on the Republican ticket for election to the Illinois Senate, but lost in a close election to Maurice Kelly. He was, however, elected to serve a special session that redistricted the state congressional and senatorial districts.

Carter was the Republican candidate for Lieutenant Governor of Illinois under Joseph W. Fifer in 1892, but the Democratic ticket of John Peter Altgeld and Joseph B. Gill was successful instead. In 1894, Carter was named a candidate for the Supreme Court of Illinois to fill the vacancy of Simeon P. Shope. He was the youngest member of the court upon his election. He served one term as chief justice in 1898–1899.

Joseph Carter married Ellen Barrell on December 3, 1879. They had three children. Carter enjoyed traveling in his free time and visited most of the United States. He died in Quincy on February 6, 1913.
