= S. Louis Rathje =

American judge (born 1939)

Justice of the Illinois Supreme Court for the Second District
- In office January 8, 1999 – December 4, 2000
- Preceded by: John L. Nickels
- Succeeded by: Robert R. Thomas

Personal details
- Born: November 1, 1939 Geneva, Illinois
- Party: Republican
- Spouse: Maria Rosa Costanzo
- Education: Wheaton College B.A. Northwestern University (J.D.)

S. Louis Rathje (born November 1, 1939) is an American lawyer and former justice of the Illinois Supreme Court from the 2nd district. He served from January 8, 1999 to December 4, 2000.

== Biography ==
S. Louis Rathje was born in Geneva, Illinois on November 1, 1939. He is a nephew of Chicago banker Frank C. Rathje. He received his B.A. degree from Wheaton College in 1961 and his J.D. degree from Northwestern Law School in 1964. He was admitted to the Illinois Bar in 1964. In 1970, he became a partner in the firm of Rathje, Woodward, Dyer & Burt in 1970. While in private practice, he was admitted to the Supreme Court Bar of the United States in 1980 and the State of Wisconsin Bar in 1989.

In the 1994 election, Rathje won the Republican primary and was elected in the general election without opposition to fill the vacancy created by Philip Godfrey Reinhard's appointment to a federal judgeship. Rathje was appointed to the Illinois Supreme Court in January 1999, following the retirement of John L. Nickels. Rathje ran for the Republican primary election in March 2000 for the Illinois Supreme Court seat and lost the election to Robert R. Thomas. Rathje served until December 4, 2000.

In the 2002 Republican primary, Rathje ran for an appellate court judgeship created by the vacancy of Robert Thomas. Thomas E. Callum defeated Rathje with 148,475 votes (50.87%) to Rathje's 143,375 votes (49.13%).

Political offices
| Preceded by John L. Nickels | Justice of the Illinois Supreme Court; 1999–2000 | Succeeded by Robert R. Thomas |
