= Robert R. Thomas =

American football player and judge (born 1952)

Robert Thomas
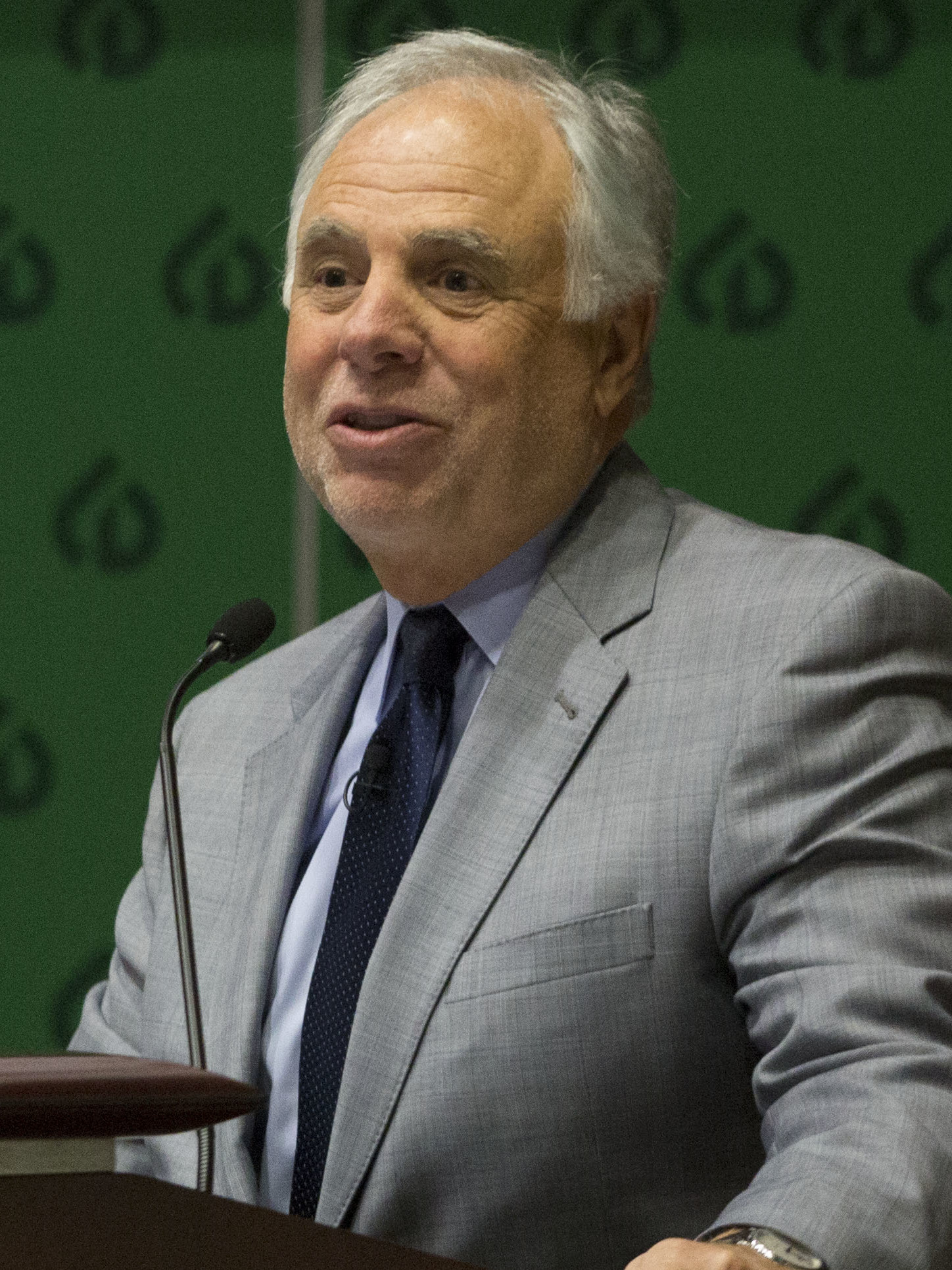
- Thomas in 2018

Justice of the Illinois Supreme Court for the Second District
- In office December 4, 2000 – February 29, 2020
- Preceded by: S. Louis Rathje
- Succeeded by: Michael J. Burke

Chief Justice of the Illinois Supreme Court
- In office September 6, 2005 – September 5, 2008
- Preceded by: Mary Ann McMorrow
- Succeeded by: Thomas R. Fitzgerald

Judge of the 2nd district of the Illinois Appellate Court
- In office December 1994 – December 2000

Chief Judge of the Circuit Court of DuPage County
- acting
- In office 1989–1994

Judge of the Circuit Court of DuPage County
- In office December 1988 – December 1994

Personal details
- Born: August 7, 1952 (age 74) Rochester, New York, U.S.
- Party: Republican
- Spouse: Maggie
- Children: 3
- Education: University of Notre Dame (B.A.); Loyola University (J.D.)
- Profession: Attorney; Judge
- Football career

No. 16
- Position: Placekicker

Personal information
- Listed height: 5 ft 10 in (1.78 m)
- Listed weight: 178 lb (81 kg)

Career information
- College: Notre Dame
- NFL draft: 1974: 15th round, 388th overall pick

Career history
- Chicago Bears (1975–1982); Detroit Lions (1982); Chicago Bears (1983–1984); San Diego Chargers (1985); New York Giants (1986)

Awards and highlights
- Super Bowl champion (XXI); National champion (1973)

Career NFL statistics
- Field goals: 151
- Field goal attempts: 239
- Field goal %: 63.2
- Stats at Pro Football Reference

Robert Randall Thomas (born August 7, 1952) is a former justice of the Supreme Court of Illinois and a former professional football player. He served as the Illinois Supreme Court Justice for the Second District from December 4, 2000, to February 29, 2020, and as chief justice from September 6, 2005, to September 5, 2008. His political affiliation is Republican.

== Early life and education ==
Born in Rochester, New York, Thomas graduated from McQuaid Jesuit High School in Rochester, where he excelled both academically and in athletics, lettering in both football and soccer.

He attended the University of Notre Dame where he kicked for the football team, including kicking the winning field goal in the 1973 Sugar Bowl victory over University of Alabama, which clinched the AP National Championship that season for Notre Dame. He received his Bachelor of Arts degree in government in 1974 and was named an Academic All-American in that same year.

He received his Juris Doctor degree from Loyola University Chicago School of Law in 1981.

== Athletic career ==
Thomas had a twelve-year career as a kicker in the National Football League.

He played for the Chicago Bears (1975–1982 and 1983–1984), the Detroit Lions (1982), the San Diego Chargers (1985), and the New York Giants (1986).

== Legal career ==
He was elected circuit court judge in DuPage County in 1988. There, he presided over civil jury trials and was the Acting Chief Judge from 1989 to 1994. In 1994, Judge Thomas was elected to the Illinois Appellate Court, Second District. On December 4, 2000, Justice Thomas was sworn in as the Illinois Supreme Court Justice for the Second District after defeating incumbent S. Louis Rathje in a contentious primary. Justice Thomas was elected to serve as Illinois Supreme Court Chief Justice on September 6, 2005, and served as the Chief Justice until September 5, 2008. In February 2020, he announced he would resign from the Supreme Court effective February 29.

=== Ruling on Rahm Emanuel ballot eligibility ===
On January 1, 2011, Justice Thomas authored the Illinois State Supreme Court decision Maksym v. Chicago Board of Elections that overturned a lower court ruling that Rahm Emanuel was ineligible to run for Mayor of Chicago.

== Honors and awards ==
In April 1996, Thomas was inducted into the Academic All-American Hall of Fame. In January 1999, he received the NCAA Silver Anniversary Award.

Justice Thomas is a member of the DuPage County Bar Association.

== Defamation of character lawsuit ==
In 2007, Justice Thomas was awarded $7 million in a successful defamation of character lawsuit against Bill Page, a former columnist at the Kane County Chronicle. Thomas' lawyers alleged that Page had essentially accused him of official misconduct, a felony. Page wrote in his column that Thomas had traded his vote on a disciplinary case in exchange for political support for his favored candidate in a local judicial race. The case was significant because it prompted an Illinois appellate court to establish a judicial privilege in Illinois, allowing judicial deliberations to be kept private, much like doctor-patient discussions.

Later in 2007, after the newspaper filed suit against Thomas in federal court, the parties came together and settled all litigation, with the newspaper agreeing to pay Thomas $3 million.

Legal offices
Preceded by S. Louis Rathje	Justice of the Illinois Supreme Court; 2000–2020	Succeeded by P. Scott Neville Jr.
