= Caswell J. Crebs =

American judge (1912–1988)

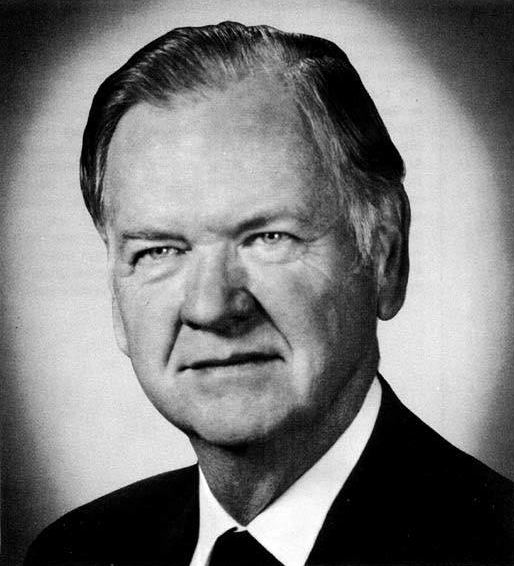
Crebs's official photograph, c. 1969.

Caswell Jones Crebs (January 14, 1912 – March 5, 1988) was an American jurist who was a justice of the Illinois Supreme Court.

Born in Carmi, Illinois, Crebs received his bachelor's degree from University of California, Los Angeles in 1932, his master's degree from University of Southern California in 1933, and his law degree from University of Illinois College of Law in 1936. Crebs was admitted to the Illinois bar in 1936. Crebs practiced law in Robinson, Illinois. From 1945 to 1964, Crebs served as an Illinois circuit court judge. From 1970 to 1975, Crebs served on the Illinois Appellate Court. In 1969 and 1970 and in 1975 and 1976, Crebs served on the Illinois Supreme Court. Crebs died in Fountain Valley, California of a heart attack while visiting a daughter.
