= Simeon P. Shope =

American judge

Simeon Peter Shope
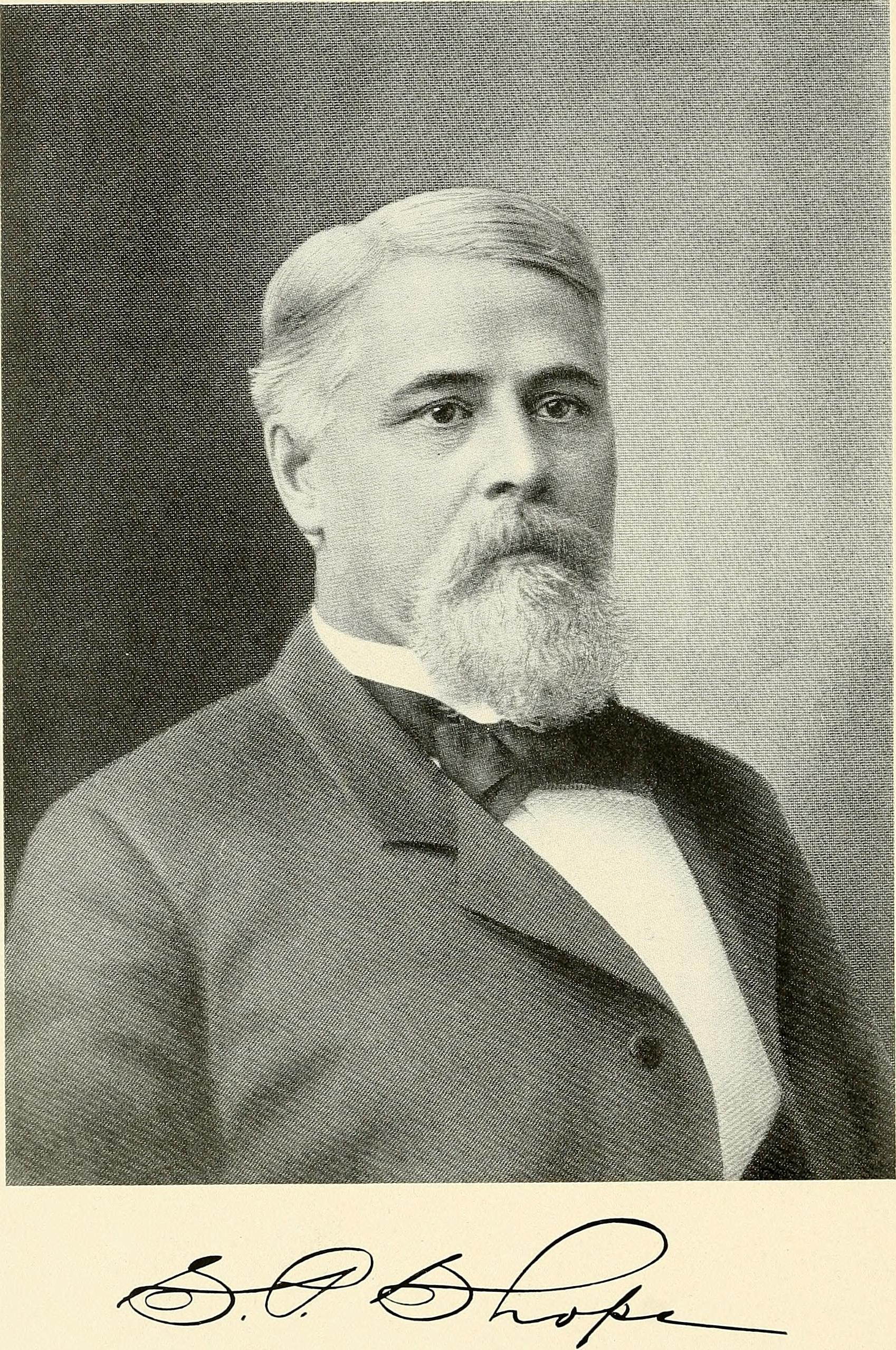

Justice of the Supreme Court of Illinois
- In office 1885–1894
- Preceded by: Damon G. Tunnicliff
- Succeeded by: Joseph N. Carter

Member of the Illinois House of Representatives from the 35th district
- In office 1862 – 1864

Personal details
- Born: December 3, 1837 Akron, Ohio
- Died: January 23, 1920 (aged 82) Chicago, Illinois
- Resting place: Oak Hill Cemetery
- Party: Democratic
- Spouse: Sarah M. Jones
- Profession: Attorney

Simeon Peter Shope (December 3, 1837 – January 23, 1920) was an American attorney and politician from Ohio. Coming to Illinois as a small child, Shope worked on the family farm before become a teacher. He studied law and formed a practice in Lewistown, Illinois with Lewis Winans Ross. Shope practiced in the town until 1877, when he was elected to a circuit court. In 1885, Shope was elected to the Supreme Court of Illinois, filling an unexpired term. Shope declined re-election in 1894 and instead opened a law practice in Chicago, Illinois.

== Biography ==
Simeon Peter Shope was born in Akron, Ohio on December 3, 1837. When he was two, his family moved to Marseilles, Illinois. In 1850, they removed to nearby Ottawa, Illinois. Educated in public schools, Shope helped on the family farm during summers. Shope took his first job as a railroad engineer's assistant. When he was sixteen, he taught classes in Marshall County, Illinois, focusing on Latin and German. The next year he taught in Woodford County. Shope then moved to Peoria where he studied under the Powell & Purple law firm. In 1856, Shope was admitted to the bar.

Later in 1856, Shope moved to Lewistown to establish a law partnership with future US Representative Lewis Winans Ross. In 1862, Shope was elected to a two-year term as a Democrat in the Illinois House of Representatives. Shope practiced in the town for twenty-one years until Shope was elected a judge of the sixth circuit court. He served a two-year term, then was re-elected to a second term but did not accept it. In 1885, Shope was elected to the Supreme Court of Illinois, replacing the seat briefly held by Damon G. Tunnicliff, himself filling the unexpired term of Pinckney H. Walker. He was chief justice of the court in 1889. Shope did not seek re-election after one nine-year term and was succeeded by Joseph N. Carter.

In 1894, upon expiration of his term, Shope moved to Chicago, becoming the senior partner of Shope, Mathis, Barrett & Rogers. He also served as general attorney of the Suburban Railroad Company.

Shope married Sarah M. Jones in 1858 and had two children, son Clarence W. and daughter Mabel Ray. His wife died in 1881. He was a member of the Benevolent and Protective Order of Elks, the Knights of Pythias, and Freemasonry, where he attained Knight Templar degrees. Shope died in an automobile accident in Chicago on January 23, 1920. He was buried in Oak Hill Cemetery in Lewistown.
