= Lloyd A. Karmeier =

American judge

Lloyd Karmeier

Chief Justice of the Illinois Supreme Court
- In office October 31, 2016 – October 25, 2019
- Preceded by: Rita B. Garman
- Succeeded by: Anne M. Burke

Justice of the Illinois Supreme Court
- In office December 6, 2000 – December 3, 2020
- Preceded by: Philip J. Rarick
- Succeeded by: David K. Overstreet

Personal details
- Born: January 12, 1940 (age 86) Washington County, Illinois, U.S.
- Party: Republican
- Education: University of Illinois, Urbana- Champaign (BS, JD)

Lloyd A. Karmeier (born January 12, 1940) is a former American judge who served as a justice of the Illinois Supreme Court from the 5th district. He served as chief justice of that court from 2016 to 2019. Karmeier retired at the conclusion of his second term in December 2020.

== Early life and education ==
Karmeier was born on January 12, 1940, in Washington County, Illinois. After graduating as valedictorian from Okawville Community High School in 1958, Karmeier received a bachelor's degree from the University of Illinois at Urbana–Champaign in 1962 and a J.D. degree from the University of Illinois College of Law in 1964.

== Early legal career ==
Karmeier clerked for former Illinois Supreme Court Justice Byron O. House from 1964 to 1968. He was elected State's Attorney for Washington County from 1968 to 1972 as a Republican. He later clerked for former US District Court Judge James L. Foreman from 1972 to 1973. He was engaged in the general practice of law with the firm of Hohlt, House, DeMoss & Johnson from 1964 to 1986. He was resident Circuit Judge of Washington County from 1986 to 2004, when he was elected to the Illinois Supreme Court.

== Illinois Supreme Court ==
He became the justice for the Fifth District on the Illinois Supreme Court. He was elected as a Republican to that seat in a highly contested election against Democrat Gordon Maag in 2000. He was sworn into office on December 6, 2000.

Karmeier narrowly succeeded in his 2010 retention election. He received 60.77% support for retention. Had he received less than 60% he would have lost retention, which would have made him only the second Illinois judge since 1994 to lose a retention election (and the first since 2004).

=== Chief Justice of the Illinois Supreme Court ===
Karmeier became 120th chief justice of the Illinois Supreme Court on October 31, 2016, and was sworn in by Rita Garman, who herself had served as chief justice. According to Herald and Review, "In his position, which he'll fill for three years after being elected by his fellow justices on the seven-member court, Karmeier will serve as the top administrator for Illinois' judicial system, which includes more than 900 judges." According to Illinois Lawyer Now, "Among other duties, the Chief Justice controls and schedules the Supreme Court's agenda for consideration in conference by the Court during its five formal terms each year, supervises all appointments to Supreme Court committees, serves as chairperson of the Executive Committee of the constitutionally-mandated Illinois Judicial Conference and presents the Court's annual budget request to the General Assembly." His term as chief justice ended October 25, 2019.

== Controversies ==
=== State Farm Insurance appeal ===
During his candidacy for the office of judge in Illinois, Karmeier managed to raise $4.8 million for his election campaign. This included a direct contribution of $350,000 from the State Farm Insurance group. Other affiliates of State Farm Insurance also paid for Karmeier's campaign. Around that time State Farm policyholders had won $1 billion against State Farm in Avery v. State Farm, and had prevailed at the intermediate appellate court. The appeal against the damages and award was pending before the Illinois Supreme Court. When Karmeier was elected, the St. Louis Post-Dispatch newspaper published an editorial, "Big business won a nice return on a $4.3 million investment ... It now has a friendly justice". Despite opposition, Karmeier refused to dissociate himself from the case, and the appeal was decided in favor of State Farm Insurance by a majority of 4-2, with Karmeier in the majority. $600 million of punitive damages as well as the award of $457 million against State Farm were reversed. In 2018, State Farm agreed to pay a $250 million settlement in a class-action lawsuit claiming State Farm conspired to defraud 4.7 million current and former customers out of the $1.05 billion award.

In 2014, Karmeier was up for a retention vote. A political group of trial lawyers funded a last-minute, $2 million advertising campaign in an unsuccessful effort to unseat him.

Karmeier addressed the controversies in a 2014 filing in the Philip Morris case, in which he wrote, "When I ran for this office a decade ago, I made only one promise. It was a promise to the People of Illinois and the voters of the Fifth Judicial District that if elected, I would decide every case free of outside influence and based solely on the law and the facts. I have honored that pledge."

== Personal life ==
Karmeier and his wife, Mary, reside in Nashville, Illinois. They have two children and six grandchildren.

Legal offices
| Preceded by Philip J. Rarick | Justice of the Illinois Supreme Court; 2000–2020 | Succeeded by David K. Overstreet |
| Preceded by Rita B. Garman | Chief Justice of the Illinois Supreme Court; 2016–2019 | Succeeded by Anne M. Burke |
