= John L. Nickels =

American judge

John Nickels
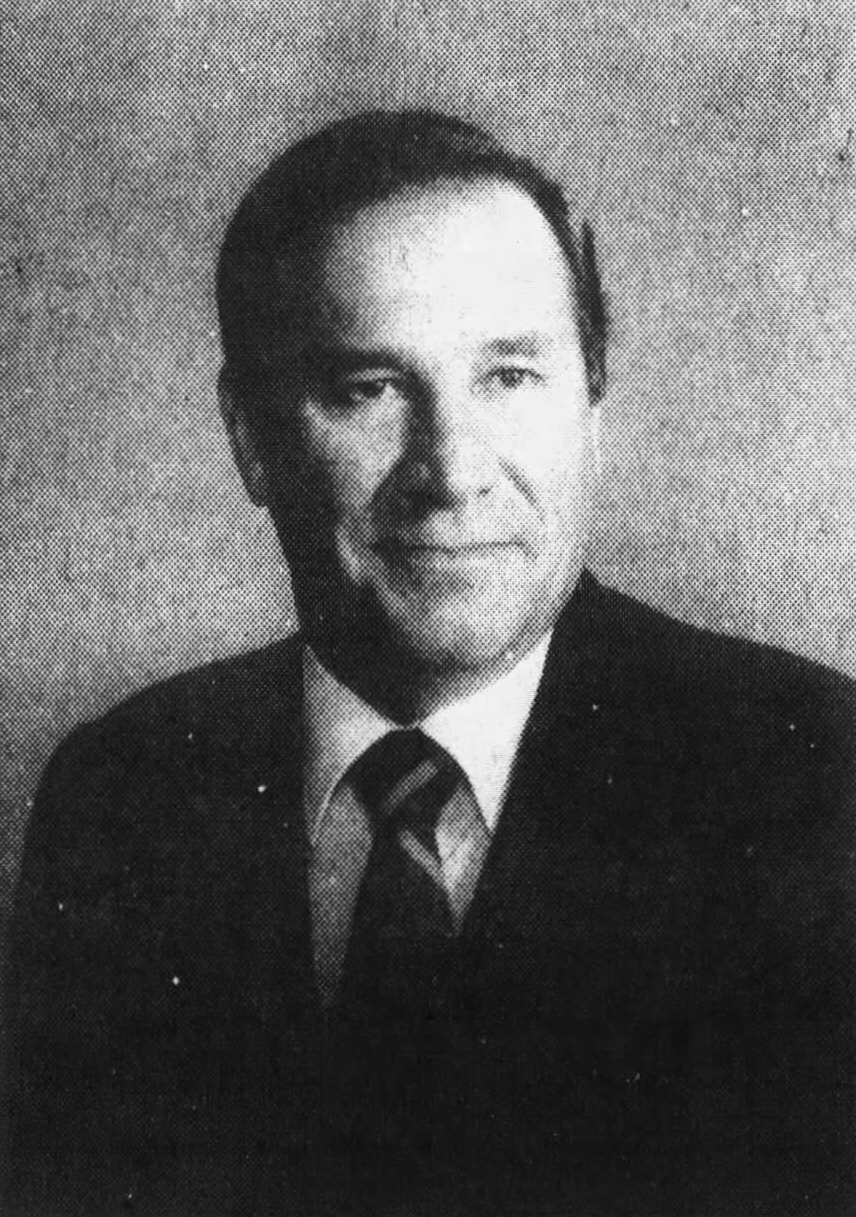
- Nickels, c. 1982.

Justice of the Illinois Supreme Court for the Second District
- In office 1992–1998
- Preceded by: Thomas Moran
- Succeeded by: S. Louis Rathje

Personal details
- Born: January 16, 1931 Aurora, Illinois
- Died: June 24, 2013 (aged 82) Maple Park, Illinois
- Party: Republican
- Education: Northern Illinois University (B.S.); DePaul University (J.D.)

John L. Nickels (January 16, 1931 – June 24, 2013) was an American jurist.

Born in Aurora, Illinois, Nickels served in the United States Army in 1954. He received his bachelor's degree from Northern Illinois University and studied at Northwestern University. He then received his Juris Doctor (J.D.) degree from DePaul University College of Law and practiced law. He served as an elected member of the Waubonsee Community College Board of Trustees, the Kane County Zoning Board of Appeals, and the Kane County Planning Commission prior to his judicial career. He served as an Illinois Circuit Court judge in 1982 and then as an Illinois Appellate Court judge in 1990. From 1992 to 1998, he served as an Illinois Supreme Court justice. He died in Maple Park, Illinois, where he had lived on his farm.
