= Macombopoly =

Interactive game in Macomb, IL

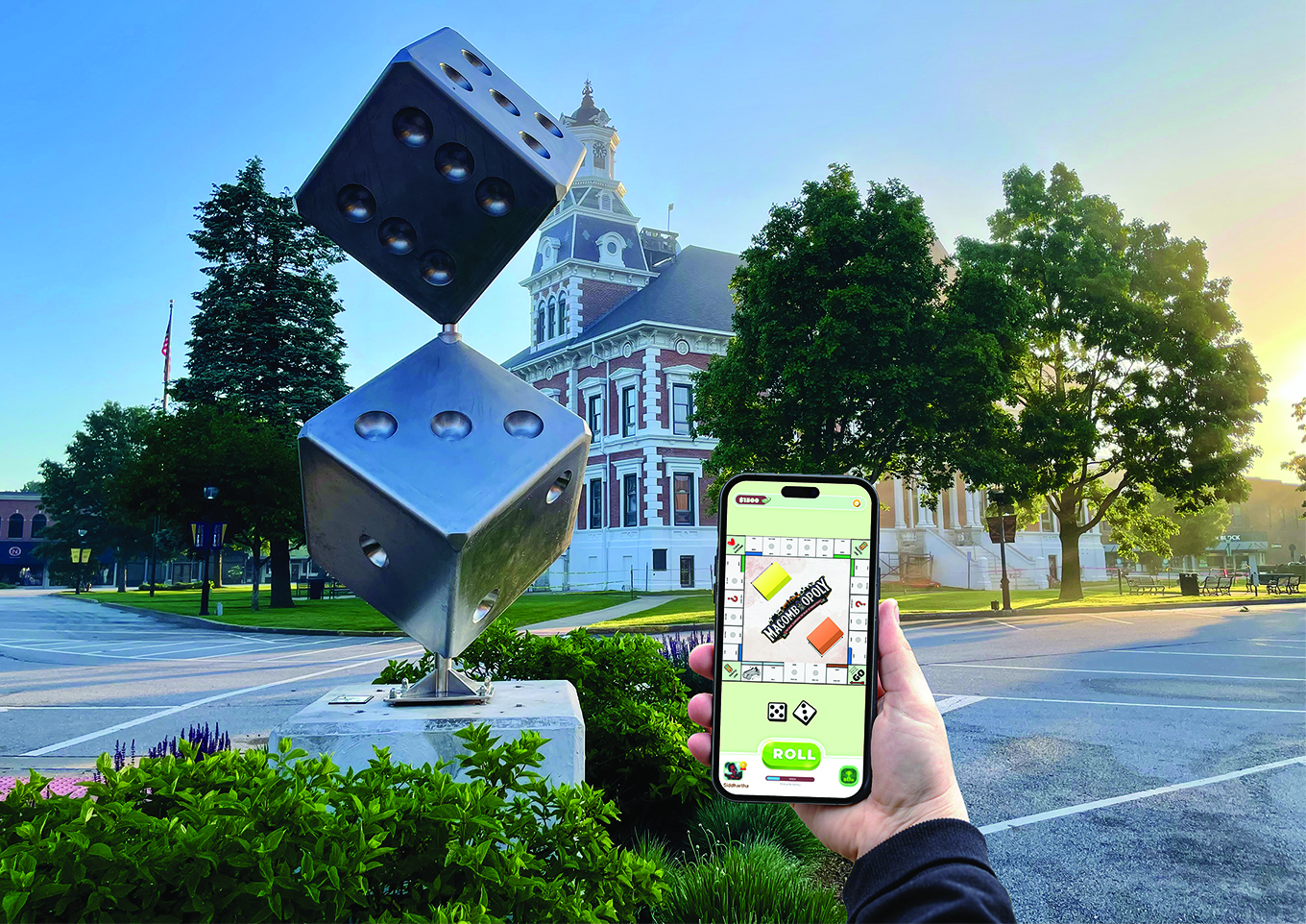
Macombopoly Attraction in Downtown Macomb, IL.

Macombopoly is the world's largest Monopoly board. It encompasses the historic Courthouse Square of downtown Macomb, Illinois, and is facilitated through a mobile application developed by eATLAS, a platform specializing in digital tours and scavenger hunts. The interactive experience guides participants around the Macomb downtown square to various landmarks, where they engage with local history and trivia. Gameplay involves completing specific objectives, such as locating monuments and capturing photographs. Participants may compete as individuals or in teams of up to five, with successful completion of tasks potentially yielding prizes. Macombopoly was officially unveiled on May 9, 2024, on the birthday of Lizzie Magie, who was born in Macomb, IL and is credited with inventing The Landlord's Game in 1903, which eventually evolved into Monopoly. The game's first ever board was modeled after the square in downtown Macomb.

== History ==
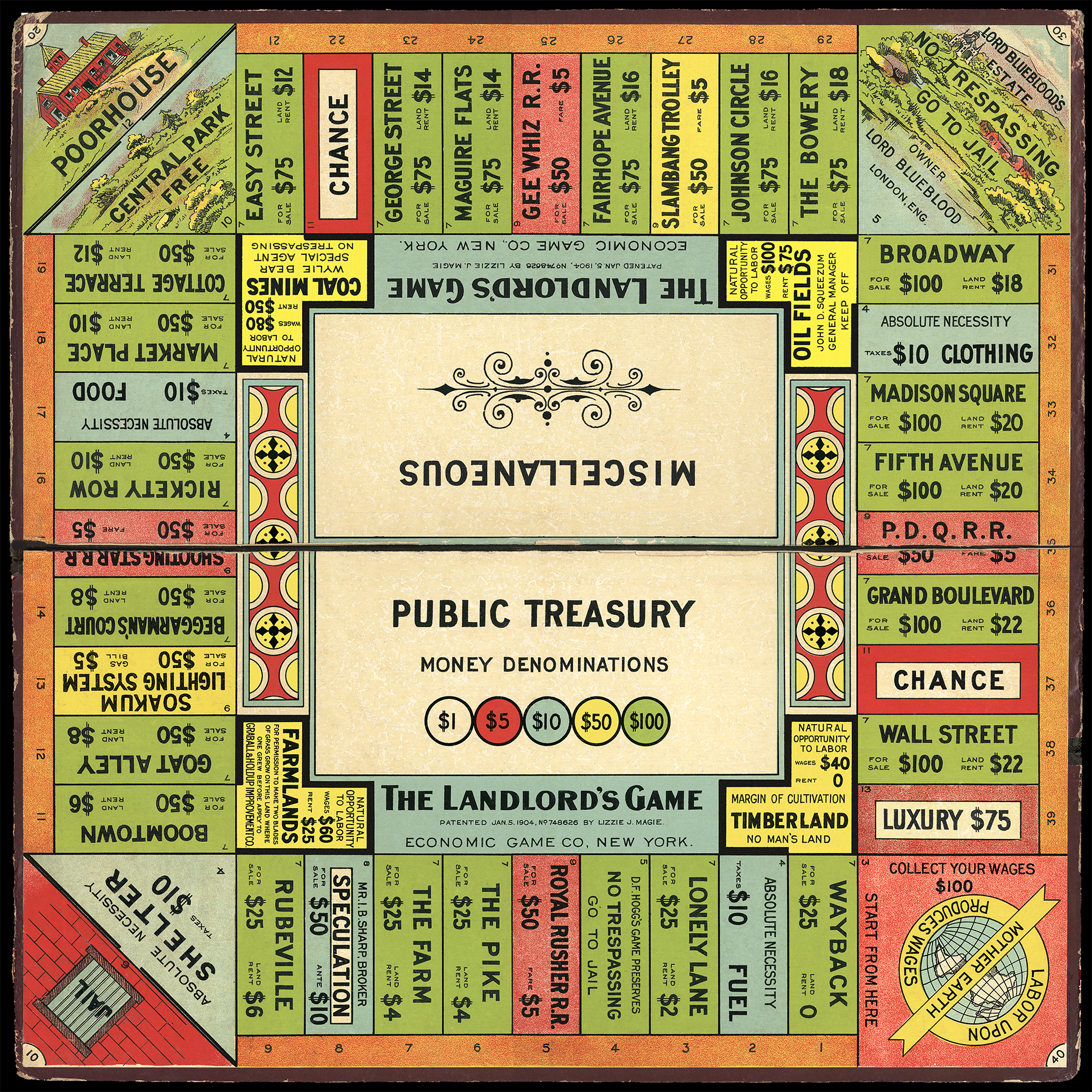
The Landlord's Game original game board

Lizzie Magie's father, James Magie, owned the Macomb Journal newspaper from 1861 to 1865. Lizzie was born in Macomb on May 9, 1866 as James was serving as U.S. Postmaster in the city.

In 1903, Lizzie Magie applied for a patent on her creation, The Landlord's Game, which she designed to illustrate the economic consequences of land monopolies and to promote the concept of a land value tax as a social remedy. She was granted U.S. Patent No. 748,626 on January 5, 1904. Published in 1906, The Landlord's Game featured two rule variations: one that rewarded monopolistic practices and another that encouraged shared prosperity. The game later inspired the creation of Monopoly.

== Details of the game board ==
Macombopoly is powered by eATLAS, which creates apps for tours and scavenger hunts. During the game, players begin on "GO" at the southeastern corner of the downtown Courthouse Square, then traverse the life-sized game board using the app to "roll the dice". Macombopoly has many of the same elements as Monopoly including a "JAIL", plus trivia about Macomb, Lizzie Magie, and opportunities to win coupons to local businesses.

The downtown square is adorned with four different Monopoly-related statues at each of the four corners of the game board: a stovepipe hat on the southeast corner, a game board on the northeast corner, a Lizzie Magie statue on the northwest corner, and a spinning dice sculpture on the southwest corner.
