= Macomb, Illinois =

- City
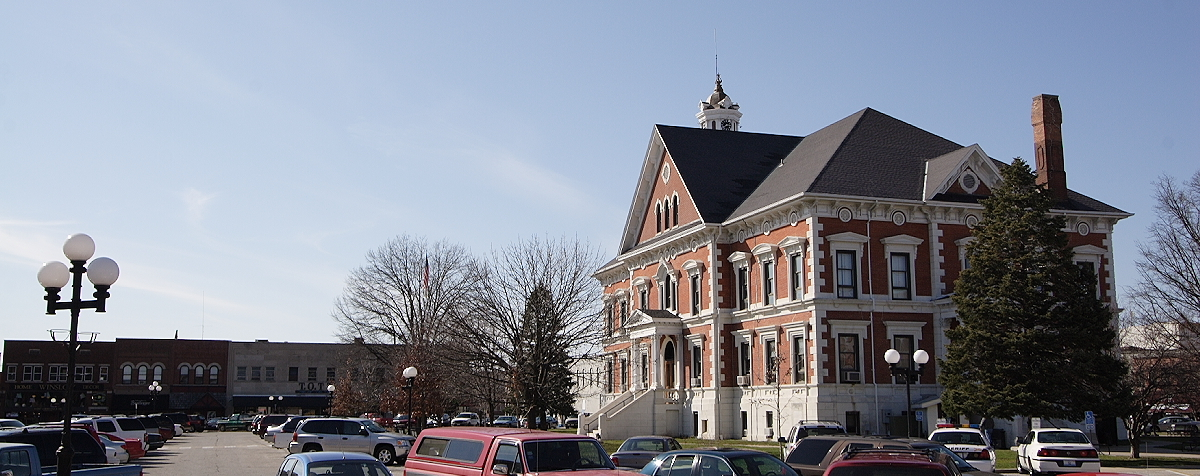
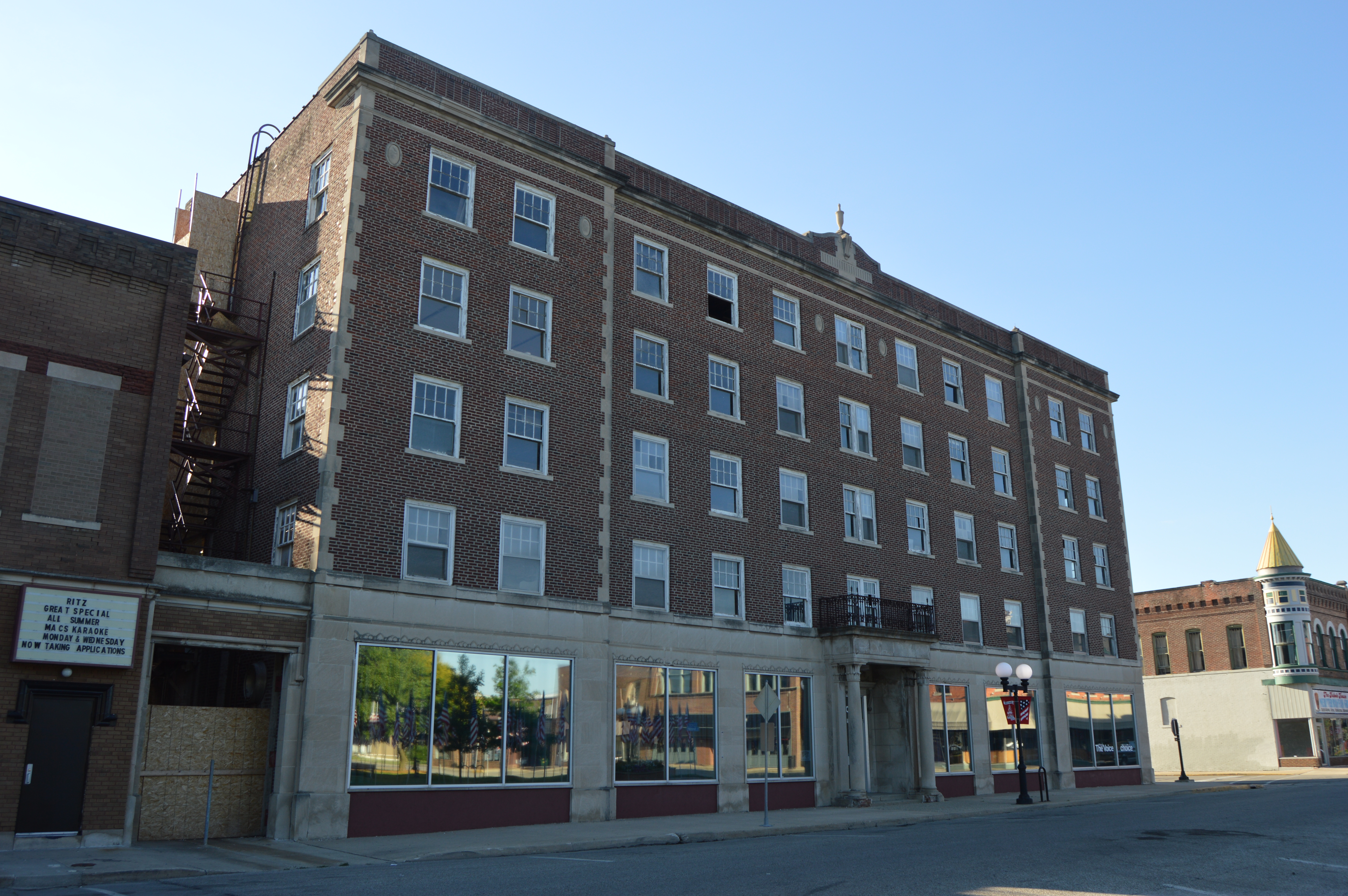
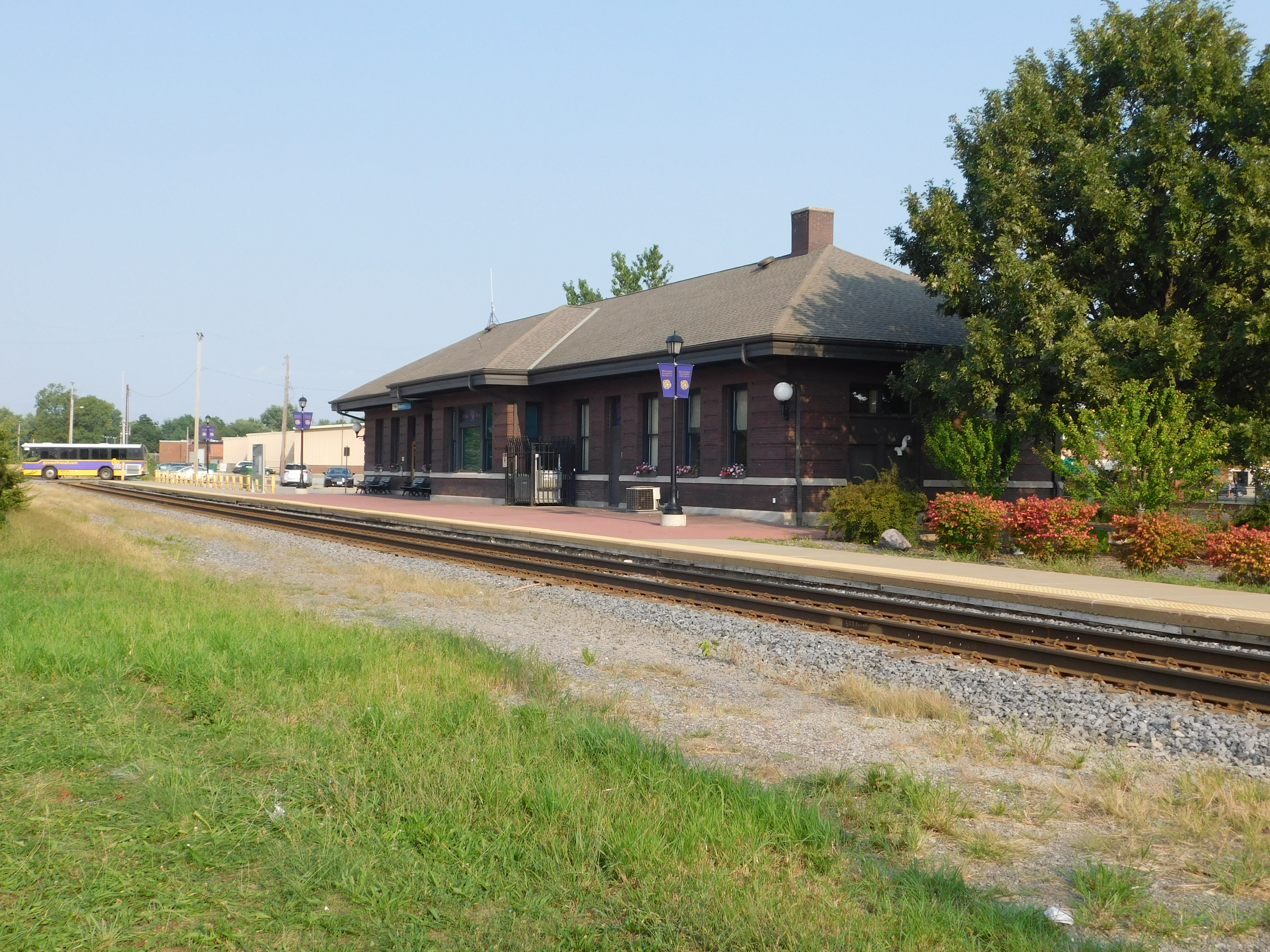
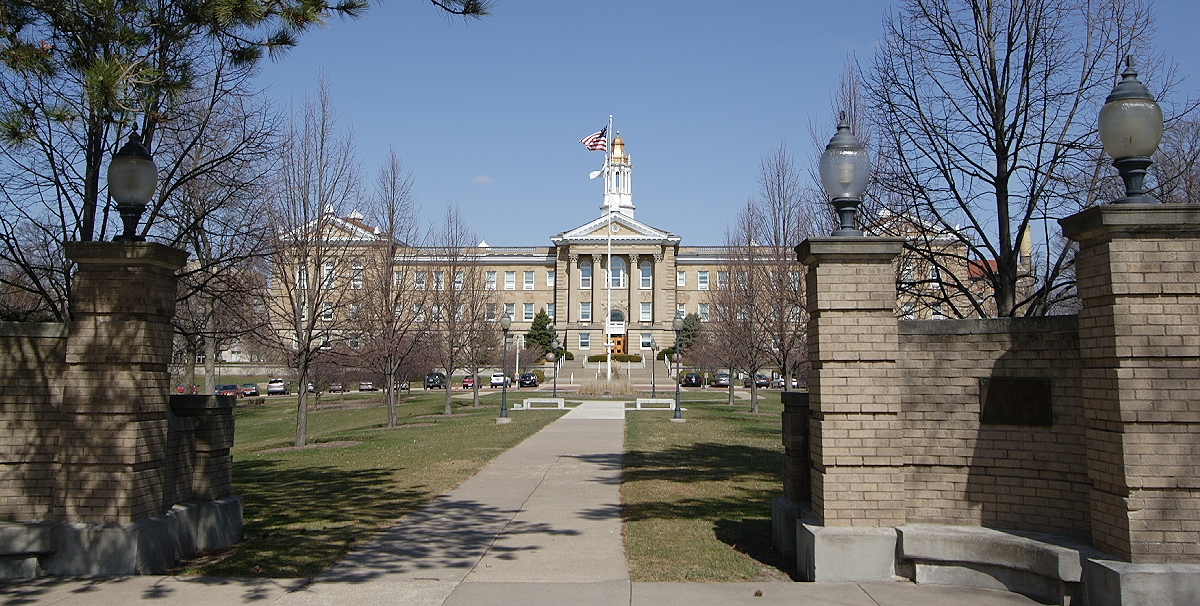
- Macomb Courthouse Square Historic District Lamoine Hotel Macomb Amtrak Station Sherman Hall, Western Illinois University

- Logo
- Interactive map of Macomb, Illinois
- Location within Illinois Location within the United States
- Coordinates: 40°28′50″N 90°41′51″W
- Country: United States
- State: Illinois
- County: McDonough
- Township: Macomb City (coterminous)
- Incorporated: December 24, 1830
- Named for: Alexander Macomb

Government
  - Mayor: Michael J. Inman

Area
  - Total: 11.03 sq mi (28.57 km^{2})
  - Land: 10.60 sq mi (27.46 km^{2})
  - Water: 0.43 sq mi (1.12 km^{2}) 3.87%
- Elevation: 643 ft (196 m)

Population (2020)
  - Total: 15,051
  - Estimate (2024): 14,765
  - Density: 1,419.8/sq mi (548.19/km^{2})
- Time zone: UTC-6 (CST)
  - Summer (DST): UTC-5 (CDT)
- ZIP Code: 61455
- Area codes: 309, 861
- FIPS code: 17-45889
- GNIS ID: 2395801
- Website: www.cityofmacomb.com

Macomb (/məˈkoʊm/) is a city in the State of Illinois, and the county seat of McDonough County, Illinois, United States. It is situated in western Illinois, about 75 miles (121 km) southwest of Peoria. As of the 2020 census, the population of the city was 15,051. Macomb is also the home of Western Illinois University.

== History ==
=== Origin ===
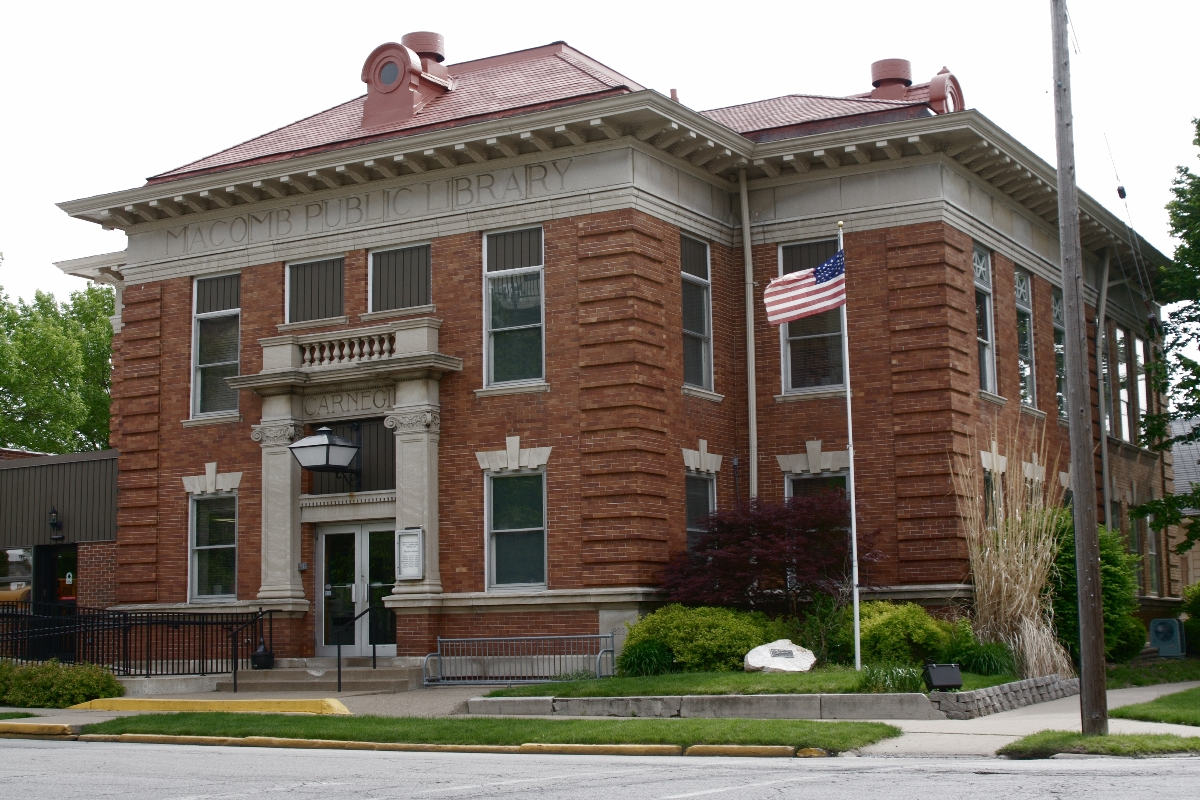
A Carnegie library, Macomb, Illinois

First settled in 1829 on a site tentatively named "Washington", the town was officially founded in 1830 as the county seat of McDonough County and given the name "Macomb" after Alexander Macomb, a general in the War of 1812. War veterans were given land grants in the Macomb area, which was part of the "Military Tract" set aside by Congress. In 1855 the Northern Cross Railroad, a predecessor to the Chicago, Burlington and Quincy Railroad, was constructed through Macomb, leading to a rise in the town's population. On April 24, 1899, the Western Illinois State Normal School, currently Western Illinois University, was founded in Macomb. Representative Lawrence Sherman was instrumental in locating the school in Macomb. In 1903 the Macomb and Western Illinois Railway was built from Macomb to nearby Industry and Littleton by local financier Charles V. Chandler, though this railroad was abandoned in 1930. In 1918, construction on Illinois Route 3 was begun as a state financed highway from Cairo to Rock Island through Macomb; in the late 1920s U.S. Route 67 was extended along this route to Dubuque, Iowa.

=== Presidential visits ===
Macomb has been visited by several US Presidents over the years. Ulysses S. Grant, Andrew Johnson, Rutherford B. Hayes, William McKinley, and Theodore Roosevelt have all made short addresses in Macomb. On two occasions, Abraham Lincoln and Barack Obama addressed large audiences prior to their election as president. Obama was stumping for the U.S. Senate at the time, meaning a president or presidential nominee has not visited Macomb in 109 years and counting.

=== St. Louis Rams summer camp ===
The WIU campus and its Hanson Field Stadium were home to the St. Louis Rams' football summer training camp from 1996 to 2004. In 2005, the Rams decided to move summer training to their own facilities in St. Louis, Missouri, ending the nine-year relationship.

=== Colts Drum and Bugle Corp Summer Camp ===
WIU's Hanson Field was home to the Colts' summer training camp in 2023. The nine-time Drum Corps International (DCI) World Class Finalist, from Dubuque, IA are a group of 160 high school- and college-aged musicians, plus 40 staff members and support team members. They train, work, and live on the WIU campus for three weeks. Members live in the residence halls and practice at Hanson Field.

=== Minor league baseball ===
Macomb was home to the Macomb Potters, who played as members of the Class D level Illinois-Missouri League in 1909 and 1910. The team also hosted two exhibition games against the Chicago Cubs. The Potters began play after local fans raised funds to start the team.

On Friday, June 18, 1909, the Macomb Potters hosted an exhibition game against the defending World Series Champion Chicago Cubs. The game was scheduled with the agreement that the Cubs would feature their regular lineup. The selected date allowed the Cubs to play in between the Cubs' series with the Brooklyn Superbas. The game was advertised as “the greatest day in the baseball history of McDonough County,” in a large advertisement placed in the June 17, 1909 Macomb Daily Journal. The teams took infield at 2:30 p.m., with the game starting at 3:00 p.m. In front of 2,964 fans, the Cubs beat the Potters 6–0. Admission was $1.00 per ticket. After the game, each team split the gate money minus expenses and each club received $971.50.

During the 1910 season, the Macomb Potters and the Chicago Cubs played a second exhibition game in Macomb. The 1910 game was won by the Cubs 5–0.

=== Monopoly ===
Lizzie Magie, the inventor of The Landlord's Game (the precursor to Monopoly), was born in Macomb. In 2024, "Macombopoly", which the town calls "the world's largest Monopoly board", was unveiled in downtown Macomb. The eATLAS app combined with painted squares and statues encourages players to explore the downtown area. One of the statues is of Magie.

== Geography ==
The East Fork Lamoine River flows past the northern part of the city.

U.S. Routes 67 and 136 pass through the city. They enter the city together from east on Jackson Street and split at the city center, US 67 turning north on Lafayette Street, and US 136 continuing west on Jackson Street. US 67 leads north 33 miles (53 km) to Monmouth and south 27 miles (43 km) to Rushville, while US 136 leads east 40 miles (64 km) to Havana and west 42 miles (68 km) to Keokuk, Iowa.

According to the U.S. Census Bureau, Macomb has a total area of 11.03 square miles (28.57 km^{2}), of which 10.60 square miles (27.45 km^{2}) are land and 0.43 square miles (1.11 km^{2}), or 3.91%, are water.

== Demographics ==
Historical population
Census	Pop.	Note	%±
1850	756		—
1860	1,834		142.6%
1870	2,748		49.8%
1880	3,140		14.3%
1890	4,052		29.0%
1900	5,375		32.7%
1910	5,774		7.4%
1920	6,714		16.3%
1930	8,509		26.7%
1940	8,764		3.0%
1950	10,592		20.9%
1960	12,135		14.6%
1970	19,643		61.9%
1980	19,863		1.1%
1990	19,952		0.4%
2000	18,558		−7.0%
2010	19,288		3.9%
2020	15,051		−22.0%
U.S. Decennial Census

=== Racial and ethnic composition ===
Macomb city, Illinois – Racial and ethnic composition Note: the US Census treats Hispanic/Latino as an ethnic category. This table excludes Latinos from the racial categories and assigns them to a separate category. Hispanics/Latinos may be of any race.
Race / Ethnicity (NH = Non-Hispanic)	Pop 2000	Pop 2010	Pop 2020	% 2000	% 2010	% 2020
White alone (NH)	16,241	16,145	11,684	87.51%	83.70%	77.63%
Black or African American alone (NH)	1,090	1,527	1,406	5.87%	7.92%	9.34%
Native American or Alaska Native alone (NH)	24	28	34	0.13%	0.15%	0.23%
Asian alone (NH)	566	462	472	3.05%	2.40%	3.14%
Pacific Islander alone (NH)	5	1	2	0.03%	0.01%	0.01%
Other race alone (NH)	11	17	54	0.06%	0.09%	0.36%
Mixed race or Multiracial (NH)	232	408	617	1.25%	2.12%	4.10%
Hispanic or Latino (any race)	389	700	782	2.10%	3.63%	5.20%
Total	18,558	19,288	15,051	100.00%	100.00%	100.00%

=== 2020 census ===
As of the 2020 census, Macomb had a population of 15,051. The median age was 29.0 years. 15.6% of residents were under the age of 18 and 16.6% were 65 years of age or older. For every 100 females, there were 91.1 males, and for every 100 females age 18 and over, there were 87.9 males.

99.1% of residents lived in urban areas, while 0.9% lived in rural areas.

There were 6,240 households, of which 21.2% had children under the age of 18 living in them. Of all households, 29.8% were married-couple households, 26.2% had a male householder with no spouse or partner present, and 36.4% had a female householder with no spouse or partner present. About 44.1% of all households were made up of individuals, and 15.9% had someone living alone who was 65 years of age or older.

There were 7,677 housing units, of which 18.7% were vacant. The homeowner vacancy rate was 5.1%, and the rental vacancy rate was 19.2%.

=== 2000 census ===
As of the census of 2000, there were 18,558 people, 6,575 households, and 2,952 families residing in the city. The population density was 1,884.2 inhabitants per square mile (727.5/km^{2}). There were 7,037 housing units at an average density of 714.5 per square mile (275.9/km^{2}). The racial makeup of the city was 88.73% White, 5.93% African American, 3.06% Asian, 0.03% Pacific Islander, 0.69% from other races, and 1.40% from two or more races. 2.10% of the population were Hispanic or Latino of any race.

There were 6,575 households, out of which 19.1% had children under the age of 18 living with them, 34.9% were married couples living together, 7.4% had a female householder with no husband present, and 55.1% were non-families. 38.4% of all households were made up of individuals, and 12.4% had someone living alone who was 65 years of age or older. The average household size was 2.10 and the average family size was 2.77.

In the city, the population was spread out, with 12.6% under the age of 18, 42.9% from 18 to 24, 18.2% from 25 to 44, 14.0% from 45 to 64, and 12.4% who were 65 years of age or older. The median age was 23 years. For every 100 females, there were 94.3 males. For every 100 females age 18 and over, there were 93.8 males.

The median income for a household in the city was $25,994, and the median income for a family was $42,069. Males had a median income of $27,663 versus $21,780 for females. The per capita income for the city was $13,470. 29.1% of the population and 12.2% of families were below the poverty line. 22.8% of those under the age of 18 and 8.1% of those 65 and older were living below the poverty line.

Outline of the Township area and the City of Macomb in McDonough County

== Economy ==
Major manufacturers in Macomb include:

- NTN-Bower Corporation
- Pella Windows
- Whalen Manufacturing
- Yetter Manufacturing (Farm Equipment)

== Arts and culture ==
Macomb is home to the annual Heritage Days Festival, which typically runs for a weekend in the summer. The fair is held at Chandler Park.

=== Museums and libraries ===
- Macomb Public Library
- Spoon River College Library
- WIU Malpass Library
- WIU Curriculum Library
- WIU Music Library
- Western Illinois Museum
- WIU Museum of Geology
- WIU University Art Gallery

== Parks and recreation ==
- Harry Mussatto Golf Course
- Lakeview Nature Center
- Macomb Park District
  - Glenwood Park
  - Patton Park
  - Veterans Park
  - Everly Park
  - Ball Fore
- Spring Lake Park

== Education ==
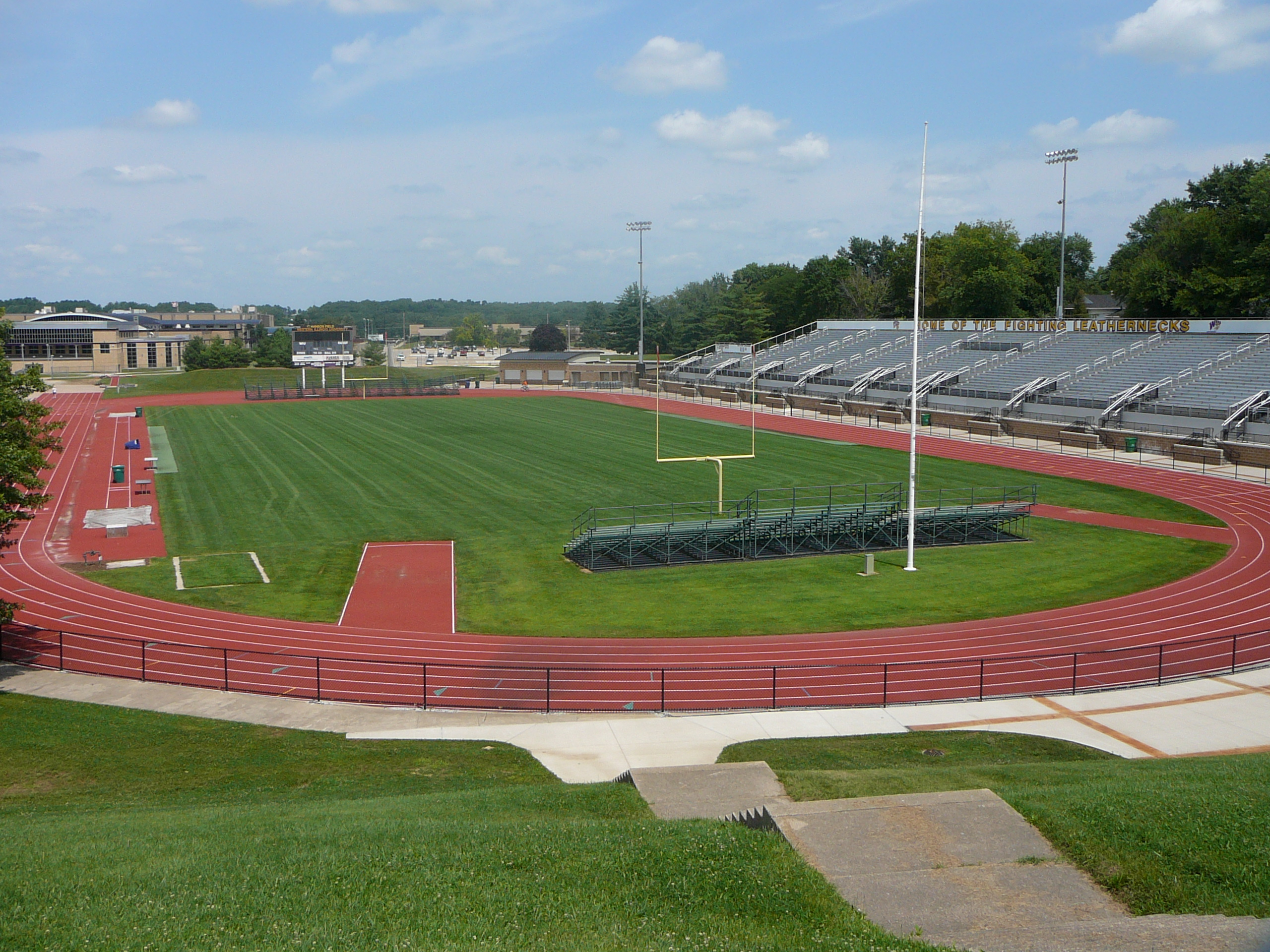
Hanson Field

It is in the Macomb Community Unit School District 185.

Public K-12:

- MacArthur School (PreK and Preschool)
- Lincoln School (K–2)
- Edison School (3–5)
- Macomb Middle School (6–8)
- Macomb High School (9–12)

Private K-12:

- St. Paul Catholic School (PreK–6)

Tertiary:

- Spoon River College, Macomb campus
- Western Illinois University

== Media ==
=== Newspapers ===
- The McDonough County Voice, daily newspaper
- Western Courier, Western Illinois University student newspaper

=== Filmings in Macomb ===
- Cast in Gray (2005)
- Wife Swap (2006)

== Infrastructure ==
=== Transportation ===
==== Highways ====
- U.S. Route 67 (Lafayette St.)
- U.S. Route 136 (Jackson St.)
- Illinois Route 110
- Illinois Route 336

==== Airport ====
Macomb is served by the Macomb Municipal Airport. The airport is approximately 3 miles (4.8 km) north of Macomb.

==== Mass Transit ====
- Go West Transit

==== Rail ====
- Macomb (Amtrak station)

=== Healthcare ===
- McDonough District Hospital is located in Macomb; it has been serving McDonough County and surrounding counties since 1958.

=== Historical Road Names ===
Following suit from its being named after General Alexander Macomb, a general in the War of 1812, Macomb makes tributes to other historical generals in its street names. The town has a Grant, Lafayette, McArthur, and Johnson Streets.

== Notable people ==
- William Birenbaum (1923–2010), college administrator
- Michael Boatman, actor, attended Western Illinois University
- Phil Bradley, Major League Baseball player (1983–1990)
- Helen Tunnicliff Catterall (1870–1933), lawyer, writer
- Charles Clarke Chapman (1853–1944), first mayor of Fullerton, California
- Bryan Cox, football player and coach, attended Western Illinois University
- Marcus Dunstan, screenwriter and director
- Harry Gamage, University of Kentucky football head coach 1927–1933
- Joe Garner, six-time New York Times bestselling author of non-fiction pop culture history
- Elizabeth Magie, inventor of The Landlord's Game, precursor to Monopoly
- John Mahoney (1940–2018), actor; alumnus of Western Illinois University
- Ty Margenthaler, assistant coach with Wisconsin Badgers women's basketball team
- Kenneth G. McMillan, Illinois state senator and educator
- Red Miller, former head coach of NFL Denver Broncos and USFL Denver Gold
- Louise Jordan Miln (1864–1933), novelist, actress, travel writer, East Asian expert
- Darrell Mudra (1929–2022), Canadian Football League and member of the College Football Hall of Fame
- Michael Norman, author of the "Haunted" book series
- Donald C. Pogue, judge
- Todd Purdum, correspondent, editor, Vanity Fair, New York Times
- Lou Saban (1921–2009), National Football League and college football player and coach
- Khalen Saunders, NFL football player (2019–present) (Kansas City Chiefs, New Orleans Saints)
- Al Sears, jazz tenor saxophonist and bandleader
- Stabbing Westward, rock band
- Damon G. Tunnicliff, Illinois Supreme Court justice; practiced law in Macomb
- Ruth May Tunnicliff (1876–1946), medical researcher
- Sarah Bacon Tunnicliff (1872–1957), clubwoman and reformer in Chicago
- Howard Turner, football player
- Ginny Vida, editor, activist, and city official
- Rev. C.T. Vivian (1924–2020), minister and civil rights leader
- Henry Wells, author, professor and expert on Latin America politics

== See also ==
- List of photographs of Abraham Lincoln
