= Oscar E. Heard =

American judge

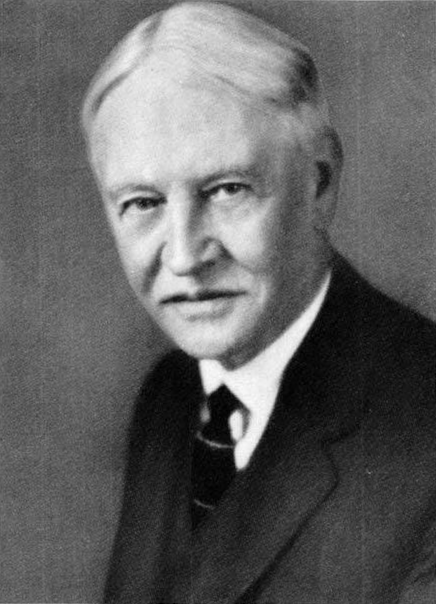
Heard's official photograph, c. 1931.

Oscar Edwin Heard (June 26, 1856 – July 16, 1940) was an American jurist.

Born in Freeport, Illinois, Heard received his bachelor's degree from Northwestern University and was admitted to the Illinois bar in 1879. He practiced law in Freeport, Illinois and was state's attorney for Stephenson County, Illinois. In 1909, Heard served as an Illinois circuit court judge and on the Illinois Appellate Court. He was a Republican. From 1924 until 1933, Heard served on the Illinois Supreme Court and served as acting chief justice in 1927–1928 and 1932–1933. Heard then practiced law with his son in Freeport. Heard died at his home in Freeport, Illinois.
