= Chicago Bar Association =

Crest of the Chicago Bar Association

The Chicago Bar Association (CBA) is a voluntary bar association with over 17,000 members. The Association was founded in 1874.

The Chicago Bar Foundation (CBF), their charitable organization, offers pro bono services and other assistance to ensure people in need have access to help dealing with the justice system.

The CBA headquarters located adjacent to the University of Illinois Chicago School of Law in the Chicago Loop.

== Notable members ==
- Anita Alvarez
- Joy Cunningham
- Clarence Darrow
- Earl B. Dickerson
- Melville Fuller
- Arthur Goldberg
- Tappan Gregory, association president (1939–1940)
- William C. Goudy
- Esther Rothstein
- John Paul Stevens
- David Ivar Swanson
- Lyman Trumbull

== See also ==
- Robert Hervey – Scottish born Canadian lawyer, one of the founding members
