= Carroll C. Boggs =

American judge (1844–1923)

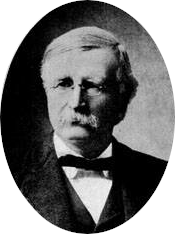
Boggs, c. 1903.

Carroll Curtis Boggs (October 19, 1844 – December 16, 1923) was an American jurist.

Born in Fairfield, Illinois, Boggs received his bachelor's degree from McKendree University. Boggs served as state's attorney for Wayne County, Illinois and as county and circuit judge for Wayne County. Boggs then served on the Illinois Appellate Court from 1891 to 1897. From 1897 to 1906, Boggs served on the Illinois Supreme Court and served as chief justice of the court in 1900 and 1901. In 1906, Boggs was the Democratic nominee for United States Senate against incumbent Shelby Moore Cullom. Boggs died in Fairfield, Illinois.
