= David K. Overstreet =

American judge (born 1966)

David Overstreet

Justice of the Illinois Supreme Court
- Incumbent
- Assumed office December 3, 2020
- Preceded by: Lloyd A. Karmeier

Personal details
- Born: January 14, 1966 (age 59) Mount Vernon, Illinois, U.S.
- Party: Republican
- Education: Lipscomb University (BS); University of Tennessee (JD)

David K. Overstreet (born January 14, 1966) is a justice of the Illinois Supreme Court.

== Education ==
Overstreet received his Bachelor of Science from Lipscomb University and his Juris Doctor from the University of Tennessee College of Law.

== Career ==
Overstreet started his legal career with Miller, Tracy, Braun & Wilson of Monticello, Illinois from 1991 to 1992. He then practiced with the Law Office of Peter G. Angelos of Knoxville, Tennessee, from 1992 to 1995, and with Mitchell, Neubauer, Shaw & Hanson, P.C., Neubauer, Hanson & Overstreet, P.C., and Neubauer & Overstreet, P.C. of Mount Vernon, Illinois, from 1995 to 2007.

=== Judicial career ===
In 2007, at the recommendation of Karmaier, Overstreet was appointed by the Illinois Supreme Court to the Second Judicial Circuit to fill the vacancy created in the by the appointment of the James Wexstten to the Appellate Court.

Overstreet was assigned to the 5th District Appellate Court of Illinois in 2017 and elected in 2018. Matthew Hartrich, the State's Attorney of Crawford County, was appointed to succeed Overstreet after the latter's elevation to the Appellate Court.

=== Illinois Supreme Court ===
Overstreet faced off against Republican primary challenger John B. Barberis Jr.

On November 3, 2020, he went on to win the general election against his challenger Democratic candidate and Appellate Justice Judy Cates. He was sworn in on December 2, 2020.

After Overstreet's election to the Illinois Supreme Court, Milton S. Wharton, a retired judge, was appointed to the vacancy on the appellate court.

== Personal life ==
He is married to his wife Suzanne and they have three children.

Legal offices
Preceded by Lloyd A. Karmeier	Justice of the Illinois Supreme Court; 2020–present	Incumbent
