= Damon G. Tunnicliff =

American judge

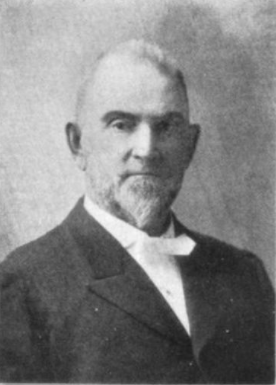

Justice of the Supreme Court of Illinois
- In office February 1885 – June 1885

Personal details
- Born: Damon George Tunnicliff; August 20, 1829; Herkimer County, New York
- Died: December 20, 1901 (aged 72); Macomb, Illinois
- Spouses: Mary Elizabeth Bailey (m. 1855; died 1865) Sarah Alice Bacon (m. 1868)
- Relations: Ralph T. Catterall (grandson)
- Children: 9, including Helen Tunnicliff Catterall, Sarah Bacon Tunnicliff, and Ruth May Tunnicliff
- Occupation: Jurist

Damon George Tunnicliff (August 20, 1829 – December 20, 1901) was an American jurist. He briefly served as a justice of the Illinois Supreme Court in 1885.

== Biography ==
Damon G. Tunnicliff was born in Herkimer County, New York. At age fifteen, he went to live with his uncle in Cleveland, and in 1849, he moved to Vermont, Illinois to run a store for his cousin.

After successfully acting as his own attorney in trials for two traffic offenses there, he read law at a firm in Rushville, and was admitted to the bar in April 1853. He began practicing law in Macomb, Illinois in 1854, and later that year he became an attorney for the Northern Cross Railroad. He remained in that position for 47 years.

He married Mary Elizabeth Bailey on January 11, 1855, and they had six children. She died in 1865, and he remarried to Sarah Alice Bacon on November 4, 1868. They had three daughters: lawyer and law historian Helen Tunnicliff Catterall, clubwoman and reformer Sarah Bacon Tunnicliff, and medical researcher Ruth May Tunnicliff.

From February to June 1885, Tunnicliff served as a justice on the Supreme Court of Illinois.

He died in Macomb on December 20, 1901.
