= Albert Watson (Illinois judge) =

American judge

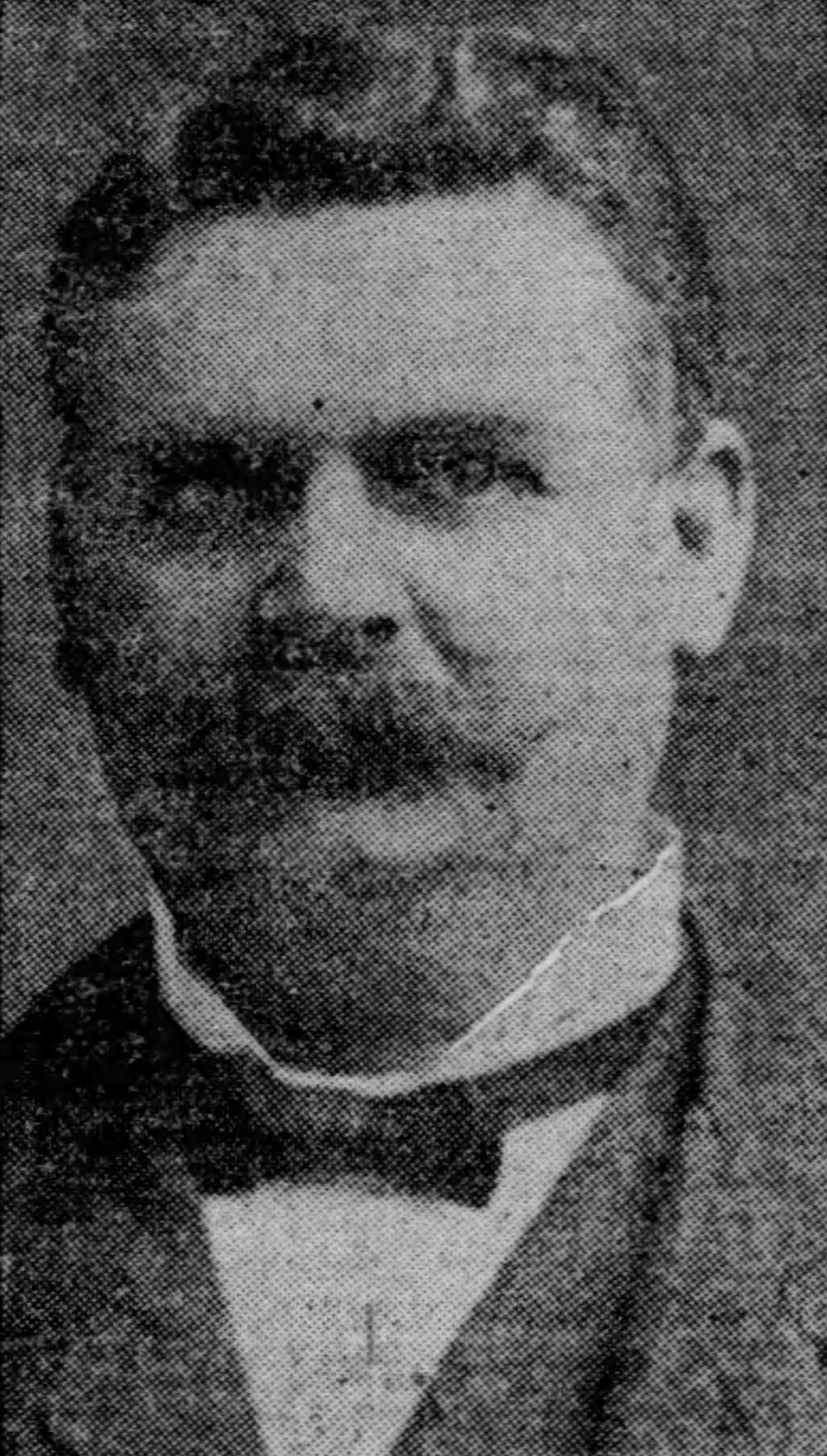
Watson, c. 1904.

Albert Watson (April 15, 1857 – November 25, 1944) was an American jurist.

Born in Mount Vernon, Illinois, Watson received his bachelor's degree from McKendree University in 1876. He served as city attorney for the city of Mount Vernon and as master in chancery for Jefferson County, Illinois. Watson served on the Illinois Supreme Court briefly from February 17, 1915, until June 4, 1915. Watson died in Mount Vernon, Illinois.
