= Horace L. Calvo =

American judge

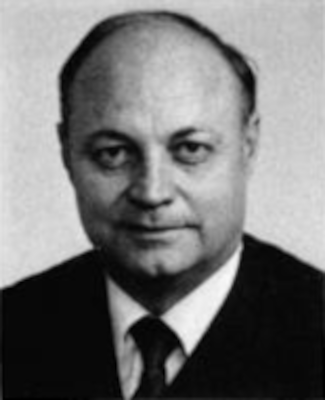

Justice of the Illinois Supreme Court
- In office 1989–1991

Personal details
- Born: January 4, 1927 Chicago, Illinois, U.S.
- Died: June 3, 1991 (aged 64) St. Louis, Missouri, U.S.
- Party: Democratic Party
- Education: University of Illinois at Urbana–Champaign; Saint Louis University

Horace L. Calvo January 4, 1927 – June 3, 1991) was an American politician and jurist. He served as a member of the Illinois House of Representatives from 1969 to 1975 and was a justice of the Illinois Supreme Court from 1989 to 1991.

Born in Chicago, Calvo went to Springfield Community College, University of Illinois at Urbana–Champaign, and Saint Louis University School of Law. Calvo was admitted to the Illinois bar even though he never had a law degree. He served in the United States Air Force from 1944 to 1947. Calvo practiced law in Granite City, Illinois. He was an Illinois assistant attorney general from 1961 to 1968. From 1969 until 1975, Calvo served in the Illinois House of Representatives and was a Democrat. In 1975, Calvo was appointed Illinois Circuit Court judge and then was appointed to the Illinois Appellate Court in 1987. From 1989 until his death in 1991, Calvo served on the Illinois Supreme Court. Calvo died of cancer in a hospital in Saint Louis, Missouri.
