= Joy Cunningham =

American judge (born 1951 or 1952)

Justice of the Illinois Supreme Court
- Incumbent
- Assumed office December 1, 2022
- Preceded by: Anne M. Burke

Personal details
- Born: 1951 (age 74–75)
- Party: Democratic
- Education: City College of New York (BS); John Marshall Law School (JD)

Joy Virginia Cunningham (born 1951) is an American lawyer from Illinois who serves as a justice of the Illinois Supreme Court. She previously served as a justice of the Illinois First District Appellate Court from 2016 until 2022. Before becoming a lawyer, she worked as a nurse, and later worked as counsel for several university hospital systems.

== Early life and education ==
Cunningham is a New York native. She received a Bachelor of Science from the City College of New York in 1975, working as a nurse before attending law school and going on to receive a Juris Doctor from the John Marshall Law School in 1982.

== Career ==
In 1982, she served as an assistant attorney general in the Office of the Illinois Attorney General, she then served as a law clerk to First District Appellate Court Justice Glenn T. Johnson. She later served as associate general counsel and chief counsel for healthcare at Loyola University Chicago for ten years. In 1996, Cunningham was sworn in as an associate judge of Cook County Circuit Court where she was assigned to the civil trial division. She served in that capacity until 2000, thereafter she served as senior vice president, general counsel and corporate secretary at Northwestern Memorial Healthcare. In 2006, she was elected as a justice of the First District Appellate Court, assuming office in December that year, and she was retained by voters in 2016. In 2012, she ran for a seat on the Illinois Supreme Court, to permanently fill the seat left by the vacancy of Justice Thomas R. Fitzgerald but lost the primary to then-incumbent appointee Mary Jane Theis.

=== Appointment to Illinois Supreme Court ===
On September 12, 2022, she was appointed by the court as a justice of the Illinois Supreme Court to succeed retiring Chief Justice Anne M. Burke. Her term began on December 1, 2022. With her appointment, Cunningham became the second black woman appointed to the court in 2022, and as of 2022, she is one of three Black people serving at the same time on the court.

== Memberships and associations ==
Cunningham is a member of the following organizations: Board of Trustees of Loyola University Health System, the Chicago Bar Association's Strategic Planning Committee, the Governor's Commission for Eradicating Poverty, the Board of Directors of the James R. Jordan Foundation, the Board of Directors of the Chicago Bar Association Media Organization, and is the Chair of the Associate Commissioners of the Illinois Supreme Court Historic Preservation Commission since 2010. From 2004 to 2005 she served as president of the Chicago Bar Association, becoming the first black woman elected as president.

== Personal life ==
Cunningham is a Democrat.

Legal offices
Preceded by Anne M. Burke	Justice of the Illinois Supreme Court; 2022–present	Incumbent
