= Joseph F. Cunningham =

American judge

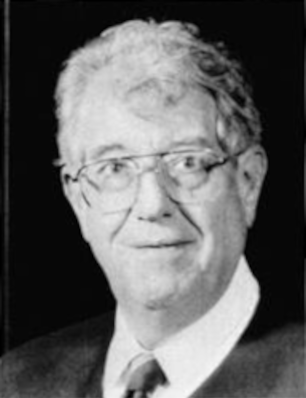
Cunningham's official photograph, c. 1987.

Joseph Francis Cunningham Jr. (February 25, 1924 – July 12, 2008) was an American jurist.

Born in East St. Louis, Illinois, Cunningham received his bachelor's degree from University of Dayton in 1946 and his law degree from Washington University School of Law at Washington University in St. Louis in 1952. He was admitted to the Illinois and Missouri bars. Cunningham practiced law. He then became Illinois Magistrate Court judge and then Illinois Circuit Court judge. From 1987 to 1988 and 1991, Cunningham served on the Illinois Supreme Court. Cunningham served as executive director of the Administrative Office of the Illinois Courts after his retirement and was adjunct professor at McKendree University. Cunningham died in Saint Louis, Missouri.
