= Supreme Court of Illinois =

Highest court in the U.S. state of Illinois

Illinois Supreme Court
- Seal of the Supreme Court of Illinois
- Interactive map of Illinois Supreme Court
- 39.797928°N 89.652724°W
- Established: 1818
- Jurisdiction: Illinois
- Location: Springfield, Illinois
- Coordinates: 39.797928°N 89.652724°W
- Motto: Latin: Audi Alteram Partem; Hear the other side
- Composition method: Partisan election
- Authorised by: Illinois Constitution
- Appeals to: Supreme Court of the United States
- Judge term length: 10 years
- Number of positions: 7
- Website: illinoiscourts.gov/supreme-court

Chief Justice
- Currently: P. Scott Neville Jr.
- Since: October 26, 2025
- Jurist term ends: October 25, 2028

The Supreme Court of Illinois is the state supreme court, the highest court of the judiciary of Illinois. The court's authority is granted in Article VI of the current Illinois Constitution, which provides for seven justices elected from the five appellate judicial districts of the state: three justices from the First District (Cook County) and one from each of the other four districts. Absent mid-term vacancy, each justice is elected for a term of ten years, which may be renewed and the chief justice is elected by the court from its members for a three-year term.

== Jurisdiction ==
The court has limited original jurisdiction and has final appellate jurisdiction in Illinois state law matters. If its decision also involves a federal question, it may be further appealed to the United States Supreme Court. It has jurisdiction in cases where the constitutionality of laws has been called into question, and discretionary jurisdiction from the Illinois Appellate Court. Until 2011, when Illinois abolished the death penalty, it had mandatory jurisdiction in capital cases. Along with the state legislature, the court promulgates rules for all state courts. Also, its members have the authority to elevate trial judges to the appellate court on a temporary basis. The court administers professional discipline through the Attorney Registration and Disciplinary Committee and it governs initial licensing through the Illinois Board of Admissions to the Bar.

For publication of its decisions and rulings, the official law report of the Illinois Supreme Court is Illinois Reports.

== Election of judges ==
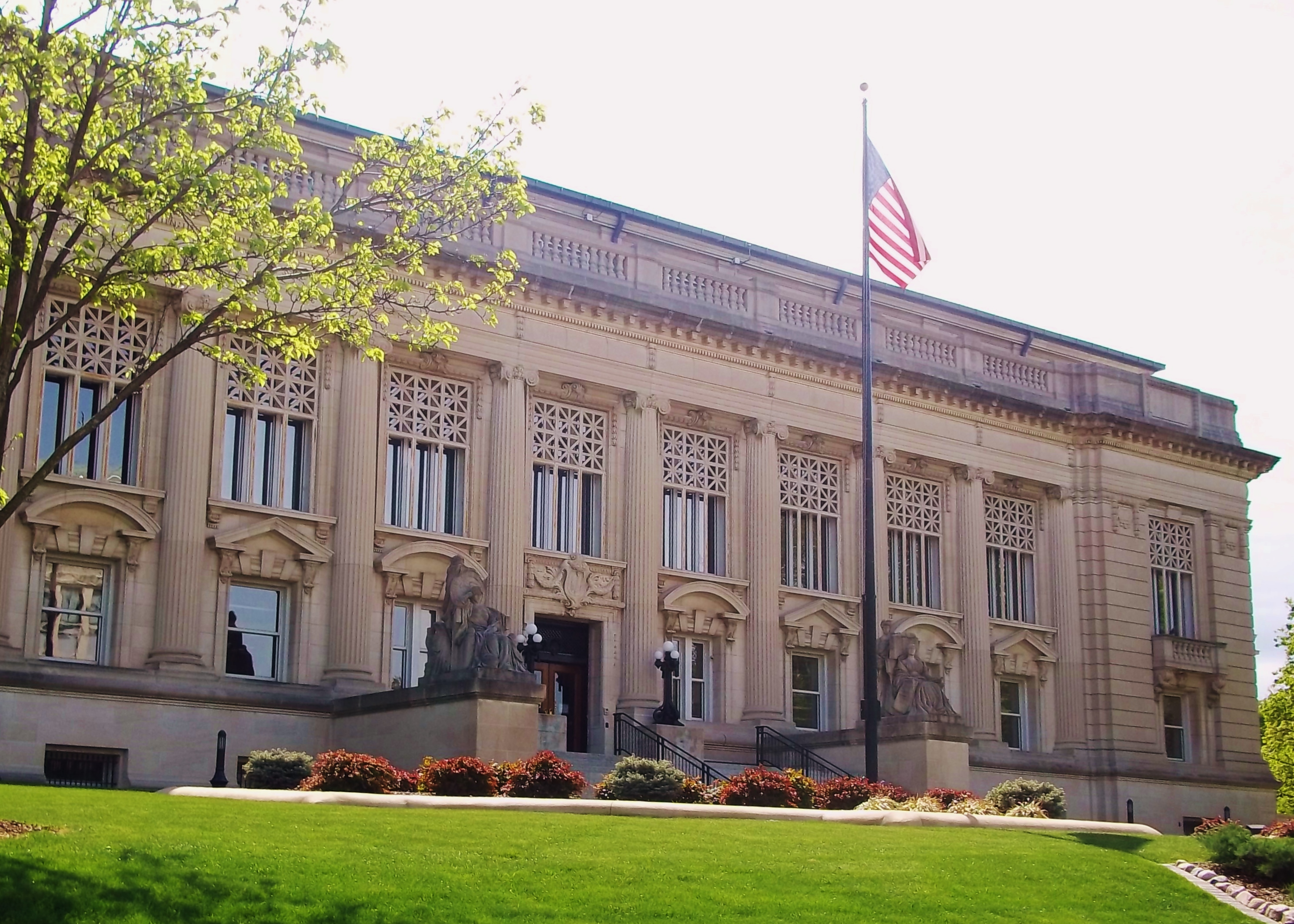
Illinois Supreme Court, Springfield, Illinois

The Supreme Court of Illinois has a system unique among state supreme courts in which it elects its justices from electoral districts through partisan elections. Under the current structuring of the court (outlined in Article VI of the 1970 state constitution), the court has seven justices representing the state's five appellate districts. Cook County (the most populous county) is contiguous with the boundary of the 1st district, which for supreme court is a multi-member district with three justices. The remaining four districts are single-member districts. Illinois is one of 21 U.S. states that holds popular elections of its supreme court justices. Of those states, it is one of only six that do so through partisan elections.

In order to take office, judges are required to be U.S. citizens, members of the state bar, and resident in the district from which they are elected or appointed. Justices run in a general election for a 10-year term. At the end of the initial term, they may run in a (non-partisan) retention election where they must receive 60% of the vote to be retained for continuing terms of ten years. When a vacancy occurs mid-term, the Supreme Court itself appoints a new justice. The appointed justice must run in the next partisan election (including primaries) that is more than 60 days from their appointment for a 10-year term to hold the seat. The court elects the chief justice from among its members for a three-year term.

=== History ===
Illinois' first constitution (in effect from 1841 until 1848) had supreme court justices appointed by the state legislature. The framers of the first state constitution had opted for the legislature to have this authority rather than the governor out of concerns of "executive tyranny". However, the citizens grew displeased with this solution after legislative Democrats engaged in a court packing scheme in 1841. This scheme was spearheaded by Stephen Douglas, and saw Democrats leverage their government trifecta to pass legislation that expanded the court from four to nine justices. The court had (before this expansion) had a 3–1 Whig-aligned majority of justices, and the court-packing scheme allowed Democratic-aligned judges to form a new 6–3 majority.

Illinois' second constitution (in effect from 1848 until 1870) replaced the appointment of judges by the legislature with the direct election of judges. At the constitutional convention of 1847, delegates decided to remove the legislature's power to appoint judges by moving to direct election of judges, in part out of a view that this strengthened the separation of powers. Additionally, the direct election of judges was a popular principal of the Jacksonian democracy movement that was popular at the time. The judiciary established by the 1848 constitution had three justices each elected strong single-member electoral districts. The constitution permitted the option for the state legislature to eliminate the districts, and instead hold at-large elections of justices. However, due to Chicago's exponential population growth, members of the state legislature preferred to retain geographic districts viewing it as preserving the malapportioned voting power of downstate Illinois in the election of Supreme Court justices. The 1848 Constitution also required that the court schedule court sessions in three different geographically-distant locations (Mount Vernon, Springfield, and Ottawa), one located in each of the judicial districts. This was does with aims of making it so that residents across the different regions of the state could have access to more easily attend some of its sessions; and so that appellants might have less distance to travel for their own cases. However, the frequent travel this necessitated of them proved unpopular with the justices themselves. Along with complaints that the court had too few justices to handle its caseload, a dislike of the travel burden was commonly cited by justices who unhappily resigned.

One of the main reasons that a constitutional convention was called in 1870 was to reorganize the state's judiciary. The state's resulting third constitution (which went into effect in 1870) expanded the court to seven members, each elected from single-member electoral districts. However this was changed by the Illinois Judicial Amendment, which was ratified by the voters of Illinois in 1962, and went into effect in 1964. This amendment instead divided the seven justices between five districts: one three-member district contiguous with Cook County and four single-member districts. While partisan elections were retained by the 1962 amendment, this was augmented so that after their initial election to the court, incumbent judges seeking re-election would be subjected to retention elections rather than competitive partisan elections.

In December 1970, alongside the vote on whether to adopt the current (fourth) state constitution, voters were given a referendum on whether (if adopted) the constitution should retain the popular election of judges, or instead provide for the appointment judges through Missouri Plan-style "merit selection". Voters opted to retain the popular election of judges. In 2021 (ahead of the 2022 Illinois judicial elections), Illinois redrew its judicial districts, the first time it had done so since 1964.

== Districts ==
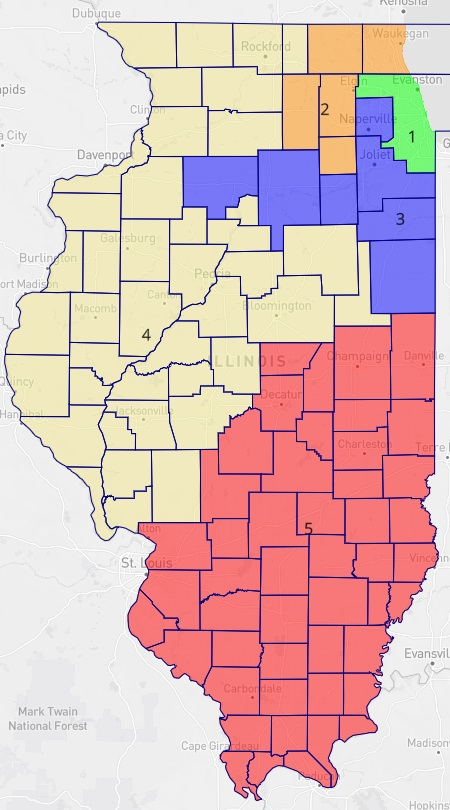
Illinois supreme court districts map since 2021

The Illinois Supreme Court is separated into 5 districts, with one Justice elected from each except the 1st, which elects three Justices. Districts are separated along county lines and follow circuit court boundaries, ensuring that no circuit courts are divided between districts.

These districts were first established in 1963 and had not been updated in nearly sixty years, despite the Illinois Constitution's requirement that the four districts outside the 1st District (Cook County) have "substantially equal population". As of 2018 Census estimates, the populations of the old districts before the 2021 redistricting were: 1st District: 5,194,000; 2nd District: 3,189,000; 3rd District: 1,805,000; 4th District 1,320,000; 5th District: 1,321,000. In comparison, the 2020 Census reports the populations of the 2021 redrawn districts as: 1st District: 5,275,541; 2nd District: 1,773,382; 3rd District: 1,959,246; 4th District 2,086,825; 5th District: 1,717,514. The state legislature redrew districts in 2021 to take effect in the 2022 elections, Illinois Governor JB Pritzker signed these changes into law.

Below are the counties per district based on the 2021 redistricting. Only the 1st District, which is constitutionally mandated to be coextensive with Cook County, has remained entirely the same.

=== 1st district ===
- Cook

=== 2nd district ===
- DeKalb
- Kane
- Kendall
- Lake
- McHenry

=== 3rd district ===
- Bureau
- DuPage
- Grundy
- Iroquois
- Kankakee
- LaSalle
- Will

=== 4th district ===
- Adams
- Boone
- Brown
- Calhoun
- Carroll
- Cass
- Ford
- Fulton
- Greene
- Hancock
- Henderson
- Henry
- Jersey
- Jo Daviess
- Knox
- Lee
- Livingston
- Logan
- Macoupin
- Marshall
- Mason
- McDonough
- McLean
- Menard
- Mercer
- Morgan
- Ogle
- Peoria
- Piatt
- Pike
- Putnam
- Rock Island
- Sangamon
- Schuyler
- Scott
- Stark
- Stephenson
- Tazewell
- Vermilion
- Warren
- Winnebago
- Whiteside
- Woodford

=== 5th district ===
- Alexander
- Bond
- Champaign
- Christian
- Clark
- Clay
- Clinton
- Coles
- Crawford
- Cumberland
- DeWitt
- Douglas
- Edgar
- Edwards
- Effingham
- Fayette
- Franklin
- Gallatin
- Hamilton
- Hardin
- Jackson
- Jasper
- Jefferson
- Johnson
- Lawrence
- Macon
- Madison
- Marion
- Massac
- Monroe
- Montgomery
- Moultrie
- Perry
- Pope
- Pulaski
- Randolph
- Richland
- Saline
- Shelby
- St. Clair
- Union
- Wabash
- Washington
- Wayne
- White
- Williamson

== Justices ==
While the justices of many states' supreme courts are expected to relocate to the state capital for the duration of their terms of office, the justices of the Illinois Supreme Court continue to reside in their home constituencies and have chambers in their respective appellate districts (for example, the three First District justices are chambered in the Michael Bilandic Building in Chicago). The justices travel to Springfield to hear oral arguments and deliberate. Accordingly, the Illinois Supreme courthouse building includes apartments for the justices' use while in Springfield.

=== Current justices ===
The court in 2023

District	Name	Born	Start	Chief term	Term ends	Party	Law school
1st	P. Scott Neville Jr., Chief Justice	1948 or 1949 (age 77–78)	June 15, 2018	2025–present	2030	Democratic	WashU
5th	David K. Overstreet	January 14, 1966 (age 60)	December 7, 2020	–	2030	Republican	Tennessee
4th	Lisa Holder White	1968 (age 57–58)	July 8, 2022	–	2034	Republican	Illinois
1st	Joy Cunningham	1951 (age 74–75)	December 1, 2022	–	2034	Democratic	UIC
2nd	Elizabeth Rochford	1960 or 1961 (age 65–66)	December 5, 2022	–	2032	Democratic	Loyola
3rd	Mary Kay O'Brien	June 4, 1965 (age 61)	December 5, 2022	–	2032	Democratic	Illinois
1st	Sanjay Tailor	March 12, 1964 (age 62)	January 30, 2026	–	2028	Democratic	Loyola

=== Previous justices ===
==== 2000–present ====
- Mary Jane Theis (2010–2026)
- Robert L. Carter (2020–2022)
- Michael J. Burke (2020–2022)
- Anne M. Burke (2006–2022)
- Rita Garman (2001–2022)
- Lloyd A. Karmeier (2000-2020)
- Robert R. Thomas (2000–2020)
- Thomas L. Kilbride (2000–2020)
- Thomas R. Fitzgerald (2000–2010)
- Philip J. Rarick (2002–2004)

==== 1900–1999 ====
- S. Louis Rathje (1999–2000)
- Michael Anthony Bilandic (1994–1997)
- Mary Ann McMorrow (1992–2006)
- Moses Harrison (1992–2002)
- John L. Nickels (1992–1998)
- Benjamin K. Miller (1984–2001)
- Joseph F. Cunningham (1991–1992)
- James D. Heiple (1990–2000)
- Charles E. Freeman (1990–2018)
- Horace L. Calvo (1988–1991)
- John J. Stamos (1988–1990)
- Joseph F. Cunningham (1987–1988)
- Seymour Simon (1980–1988)
- Thomas E. Kluczynski (1978–1980)
- William G. Clark (1976–1992)
- Caswell J. Crebs (1975–1976)
- Thomas J. Moran (1976–1992)
- James A. Dooley (1976–1978)
- Howard C. Ryan (1970–1990)
- Joseph H. Goldenhersh (1970–1987)
- Charles H. Davis (2nd time, 1970–1975)
- Marvin Burt (1969–1970)
- Caswell J. Crebs (1969–1970)
- John T. Culbertson Jr. (1969–1970)
- Thomas E. Kluczynski (1966–1976)
- Daniel P. Ward (1966–1990)
- Robert C. Underwood (1962–1984)
- Roy Solfisburg (1962–1963)
- Byron O. House (1957–1969)
- Charles H. Davis (1st time, 1955–1960)
- Ray Klingbiel (1953–1969)
- Walter V. Schaefer (1951–1976)
- Harry B. Hershey (1951–1966)
- George W. Bristow (1951–1961)
- Ralph L. Maxwell (1951–1956)
- Albert M. Crampton (1948–1953)
- Joseph E. Daily (1948–1965)
- Jesse L. Simpson (1947–1951)
- Charles H. Thompson (1942–1950)
- William J. Fulton (1942–1954)
- June C. Smith (1941–1947)
- Loren E. Murphy (1939–1948)
- Walter T. Gunn (1938–1951)
- Francis S. Wilson (1935–1951)
- Elwyn Riley Shaw (1933–1942)
- Lott R. Herrick (1933–1937)
- Paul Farthing (1933–1942)
- Norman L. Jones (1931–1940)
- Warren H. Orr (1930–1939)
- Paul Samuell (1929–1930)
- Cyrus E. Dietz (1928–1929)
- Oscar E. Heard (1927–1928)
- Frank K. Dunn (1907–1933)
- Frederic R. DeYoung (1924–1934)
- Oscar E. Heard (1924–1933)
- Floyd E. Thompson (1919–1928)
- Clyde E. Stone (1918–1948)
- Warren W. Duncan (1915–1933)
- Albert Watson (1915–1915)
- Charles C. Craig (1913–1918)
- George A. Cooke (1909–1919)
- Frank K. Dunn (1907–1933)
- Orrin N. Carter (1906–1924)
- Alonzo K. Vickers (1906–1915)
- William M. Farmer (1906–1931)
- Guy C. Scott (1903–1909)
- James B. Ricks (1901–1906)
- John P. Hand (1900–1913)

==== 1818–1899 ====
- Carroll C. Boggs (1897–1906)
- Joseph N. Carter (1894–1903)
- James H. Cartwright (1895–1924)
- Jesse J. Phillips (1893–1901)
- Joseph M. Bailey (1888–1895)
- Jacob W. Wilkin (1888–1907)
- Benjamin D. Magruder (1885–1906)
- Simeon P. Shope (1885–1894)
- Damon G. Tunnicliff (1885–1885)
- David J. Baker Jr. (1888–1897)
- John H. Mulkey (1879–1888)
- David J. Baker Jr. (1878–1879)
- T. Lyle Dickey (1875–1885)
- Alfred M. Craig (1873–1900)
- John Scholfield (1873–1893)
- William K. McAllister (1870–1875)
- Benjamin R. Sheldon (1870–1888)
- John M. Scott (1870–1888)
- Anthony Thornton (1870–1873)
- Charles B. Lawrence (1864–1873)
- Corydon Beckwith (1864–1864)
- Pinkney H. Walker (1858–1888)
- Sidney Breese (1857–1878)
- Onias C. Skinner (1855–1858)
- Walter B. Scates (1853–1857)
- Lyman Trumbull (1848–1853)
- David M. Woodson (1848–1848)
- Jesse B. Thomas Jr. (1847–1848)
- William A. Denning (1847–1848)
- Norman H. Purple (1845–1848)
- Gustavus P. Koerner (1845–1848)
- James Shields (1843–1845)
- Jesse B. Thomas Jr. (1843–1845)
- John D. Caton (1843–1864)
- John M. Robinson (1843–1843)
- Richard M. Young (1843–1847)
- James Semple (1843–1843)
- John Dean Caton (1842–1843)
- Stephen A. Douglas (1841–1843)
- Samuel H. Treat (1841–1855)
- Walter B. Scates (1841–1847)
- Sidney Breese (1841–1843)
- Thomas Ford (1841–1842)
- Theophilus W. Smith (1825–1842)
- Samuel D. Lockwood (1825–1848)
- Thomas Reynolds (1822–1825)
- William Wilson (1819–1848)
- Joseph Phillips (1818–1822)
- Thomas C. Browne (1818–1848)
- William P. Foster (1818–1819)
- John Reynolds (1818–1825)

== See also ==
- Judiciary of Illinois
- List of Clerks of the Supreme Court of Illinois

== Bibliography ==
- List of Supreme Court Justices from Supreme Court's website
- Scammon, J. Young (1841). Illinois Reports v. 1 (2 ed.). Chicago: Gale & Burley.
- Gilman, Charles; Russell H. Curtis (1886). Illinois Reports v. 10. Chicago: Callaghan & Co.
- Peck, E. (1856). Illinois Reports v. 16. Chicago: D. B. Cooke & Co.
- Peck, E. (1869). Illinois Reports v. 16 (2 ed.). St. Louis: W. J. Gilbert.
- Peck, E. (1858). Illinois Reports v. 19. Chicago: D. B. Cooke & Co.
- Ewell, Marshall D. Illinois Reports v. 33.
- Freeman, Norman L. (1866). Illinois Reports v. 44. Callaghan & Co.
