= Ralph T. Catterall =

American lawyer

Ralph Tunnicliff Catterall (14 March 1897 – 8 October 1978), judge of the Virginia State Corporation Commission.

== Early life ==
Catterall was born in Chicago, Illinois, the son of English-born historian Ralph C. H. Catterall and lawyer Helen Tunnicliff Catterall. His maternal grandfather was judge Damon G. Tunnicliff. He graduated from Harvard University. During World War I he was a second lieutenant in the United States Army.

== Career ==
After completing law school, Catterall joined a law firm in New York City. In 1924 he moved to Richmond, Virginia, where he practiced law at Williams, Mullen & Hazelgrove and taught constitutional law part-time at the T. C. Williams School of Law of the University of Richmond from 1924 to 1949.

On 14 April 1949 the governor appointed Catterall to the State Corporation Commission to fill an unexpired term. Catterall served until 1973 (retiring at age 75) and had an enduring influence on the SCC, especially in regulating banks and public utilities.

== Massive Resistance ==
Although Massive Resistance did not directly affect the State Corporation Commission, Catterall was friendly to the Byrd Organization which advocated such opposition to the school desegregation rulings in Brown v. Board of Education in 1954 and 1955. He published an article very critical of the U.S. Supreme Court's rulings to desegregate public schools.

== Death and legacy ==
Judge Catterall died in 1978 and was buried in Hollywood Cemetery (Richmond, Virginia). In 1995, the State Corporation Commission unveiled his portrait.
