= Moses Harrison =

American judge

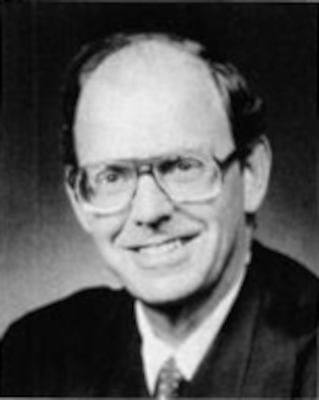

Chief Justice of the Illinois Supreme Court
- In office 2000–2002

Justice of the Illinois Supreme Court
- In office 1992–2002

Personal details
- Born: Moses Wilkins Harrison II; March 30, 1932; Collinsville, Illinois, U.S.
- Died: April 25, 2013 (aged 81); St. Louis, Missouri, U.S.
- Political party: Democratic
- Education: Colorado College (BA); Washington University in St. Louis (LLB)

Moses Wilkins Harrison II (March 30, 1932 – April 25, 2013) was an American attorney and jurist who served as a judge of the Illinois Appellate Court and the Supreme Court of Illinois.

== Early life and education ==
Born in Collinsville, Illinois, Harrison received his bachelor's degree from Colorado College and his law degree from Washington University School of Law.

== Career ==
After graduating Harrison practiced law for about fifteen years in the state of Illinois. He was appointed as a circuit judge in 1973. An election was held for the position the following year, which Harrison won. He served as the chief judge of the Third Judicial Circuit in Edwardsville, Illinois until 1979, at which point Harrison was appointed to the Illinois Appellate Courts, remaining there until 1992, when he was appointed to the Supreme Court of Illinois. Harrison was affiliated with the Democratic Party.

In 2000, Harrison became the chief justice of the Supreme Court of Illinois, a position he held until his retirement in 2002.

== Personal life ==
In 1961, he married Sharon Phillips, with whom he had three children. Harrison died in St. Louis in 2013.
