= 2022 Illinois judicial elections =

- November 8, 2022

The 2022 Illinois judicial elections consisted of both partisan and retention elections.

The general election was held on November 8, 2022. These elections were a part of the 2022 Illinois elections.

== Supreme Court of Illinois ==
Justices of the Supreme Court of Illinois are elected by district. Two seats held partisan elections. Originally, two additional seats were scheduled as retention elections, however Justice Rita Garman retired on July 7, 2022, and the retention election for her seat was canceled.

The court has seven seats total separated into five districts. The first district, representing Cook County, contains three seats, making it a multi-member district, while the other four districts are single-member districts. Justices hold ten year terms.

On June 4, 2021, Governor J. B. Pritzker signed legislation that redrew the Supreme Court's districts. Before this, the districts had not been redrawn in over five decades. The court had previously been using boundaries created in 1964.

=== 2nd district ===
In 2020, Justice Robert R. Thomas of the 2nd district was up for retention. However, Thomas retired on February 29, 2020. On March 1, 2020, Michael J. Burke, a Republican, was appointed to his seat and held it until a special election in 2022. The redrawn 2nd district comprises the 16th, 19th, 22nd, and 23rd Judicial Circuits, with the 15th, 17th, and 18th Judicial Circuits removed. Since Justice Burke's residence is in the 18th Judicial Circuit which is now located in the 3rd district, he ran in the election to that seat, leaving the 2nd district with an open race.

==== Democratic primary ====
===== Candidates =====
- Rene Cruz, Judge of the Kane County Circuit Court (16th Judicial Circuit)
- Elizabeth Rochford, Judge of the Lake County Circuit Court (19th Judicial Circuit)
- Nancy Rotering, mayor of Highland Park, candidate for Illinois Attorney General in 2018, candidate for Illinois's 10th congressional district in 2016

===== Results =====
Democratic primary results
Party	Candidate	Votes	%
Democratic	Elizabeth Rochford	42,955	44.42%
Democratic	Nancy Rotering	27,763	28.71%
Democratic	Rene Cruz	25,977	26.86%
Total votes		96,695	100.0%

==== Republican primary ====
===== Candidates =====
- Daniel B. Shanes, Judge of the Lake County Circuit Court (19th Judicial Circuit)
- Mark C. Curran, former Lake County sheriff (2006–2018), Republican nominee for U.S. Senate in 2020
- Susan F. Hutchinson, Justice of the Illinois Appellate Court (2nd District)
- John A. Noverini, Judge of the Kane County Circuit Court (16th Judicial Circuit)

===== Results =====
Republican primary results
Party	Candidate	Votes	%
Republican	Mark Curran	31,628	29.53%
Republican	Daniel Shanes	30,204	28.20%
Republican	John Noverini	23,234	21.69%
Republican	Susan Hutchinson	22,049	20.58%
Total votes		107,115	100.0%

==== General election ====
===== Results =====
2022 Illinois Supreme Court election (District 2)
Party	Candidate	Votes	%
Democratic	Elizabeth Rochford	318,281	55.23%
Republican	Mark Curran	258,014	44.77%
Total votes		576,295	100.0%
Democratic win (new seat)			

=== 3rd district ===
In 2020, 3rd district judge Thomas L. Kilbride, a Democrat, lost his retention election. 56.5% of the vote was to retain Justice Kilbride, but under Illinois law, a Justice must receive at least 60% of the vote in order to be retained. Robert L. Carter, a Democrat, was appointed by the court to hold the seat until a 2022 special election to fill it. Upon his appointment, Carter declared that he did not intend to seek reelection in 2022. The redrawn 3rd district kept the 12th and 13th Judicial District in it boundaries from the previous map. The redrawn district also added the 18th and 21st Judicial Districts and removed the 9th, 10th, and 14th Judicial Districts from its boundaries, which were moved to the redrawn 4th district.

==== Democratic primary ====
===== Candidates =====
- Mary K. O'Brien, Justice of the Illinois Appellate Court (3rd District), former state representative (1997–2003)

===== Results =====
Democratic primary results
Party	Candidate	Votes	%
Democratic	Mary K. O'Brien	110,882	100.0%
Total votes		110,882	100.0%

==== Republican primary ====
===== Candidates =====
- Michael J. Burke, incumbent Associate Justice of the Illinois Supreme Court (2nd District)

===== Results =====
Republican primary results
Party	Candidate	Votes	%
Republican	Michael J. Burke (incumbent)	122,598	100.0%
Total votes		122,598	100.0%

==== General election ====
===== Results =====
2022 Illinois Supreme Court election (District 3)
Party	Candidate	Votes	%
Democratic	Mary K. O'Brien	349,164	51.13%
Republican	Michael J. Burke (incumbent)	333,669	48.87%
Total votes		682,833	100.0%
Democratic gain from Republican			

=== Retention elections ===
District	Incumbent				Vote	
District	Party	Name	In office since	Previous years elected/retained	Yes (Retain)	No (Remove)
1st	Democratic	Mary Jane Theis	October 26, 2010	2012 (elected)	918,128 (78.30%)	254,423 (21.70%)

== Illinois Appellate Court ==
Illinois Appellate Court justices hold ten-year terms. Retention and partisan elections were held for several of these positions.

=== 1st district ===
Two open seats were up for election after the retirement of Justices Shelvin Hall and Sheldon Harris.

==== Hall vacancy ====
===== Democratic primary =====
====== Candidates ======
- Russell Hartigan, former Judge of the Cook County Circuit Court (2010–2017)
- Dominique Ross, Judge of the Cook County Circuit Court (5th Subcircuit)
- Debra Walker, Judge of the Cook County Circuit Court

====== Results ======
Democratic primary results
Party	Candidate	Votes	%
Democratic	Debra B. Walker	204,270	44.82%
Democratic	Dominique C. Ross	156,240	34.28%
Democratic	Russell Hartigan	95,243	20.90%
Total votes		455,753	100.0%

===== General election =====
====== Results ======
2022 Illinois Appellate Court election (District 1, Hall vacancy)
Party	Candidate	Votes	%
Democratic	Debra B. Walker	1,082,856	100.0%
Total votes		1,082,856	100.0%
Democratic hold			

== Lower courts ==
Lower courts also saw judicial elections.
