= 2004 United States House of Representatives elections in Illinois =

- November 2, 2004

All 19 Illinois seats to the United States House of Representatives
	Majority party	Minority party
Party	Democratic	Republican
Last election	10	9
Seats won	10	9
Seat change	Steady	Steady
Popular vote	2,675,273	2,271,676
Percentage	53.63%	45.54%

Democratic
50–60%
60–70%
70–80%
80–90%
Republican
50–60%
60–70%
70–80%
80–90%

The 2004 congressional elections in Illinois were held November 2, 2004 to determine who would represent the State of Illinois in the United States House of Representatives.

Illinois had nineteen seats in the House, apportioned according to the 2000 United States census. Representatives are elected for two-year terms; those elected would serve in the 109th Congress from January 3, 2005, to January 3, 2007.

== Overview ==
2004 United States House of Representatives elections in Illinois
Party	Votes	Percentage	Seats	+/–
Democratic	2,675,273	53.63%	10	—
Republican	2,271,676	45.54%	9	—
Libertarian	36,629	0.73%	0	—
Write-in	5,087	0.10%	0	-
Totals	4,998,665	100.0%	19	—

== District 1 ==
2004 Illinois's 1st congressional district election
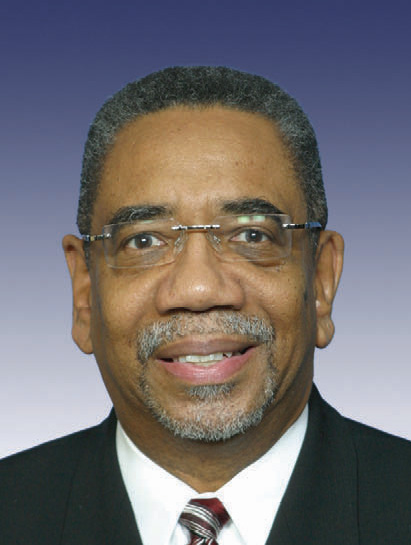

Nominee	Bobby Rush	Raymond Wardingley
Party	Democratic	Republican
Popular vote	212,109	37,840
Percentage	84.9%	15.1%
- County results Rush: 80–90%
U.S. Representative before election
Bobby Rush
Democratic
Elected U.S. Representative
Bobby Rush
Democratic

=== Predictions ===
Source	Ranking	As of
The Cook Political Report	Safe D	October 29, 2004
Sabato's Crystal Ball	Safe D	November 1, 2004

=== Results ===
2004 Illinois's 1st congressional district election
Party	Candidate	Votes	%
Democratic	Bobby Rush (incumbent)	212,109	84.86
Republican	Raymond Wardingley	37,840	15.14
Total votes		249,949	100.0
Democratic hold			

== District 2 ==
2004 Illinois's 2nd congressional district election
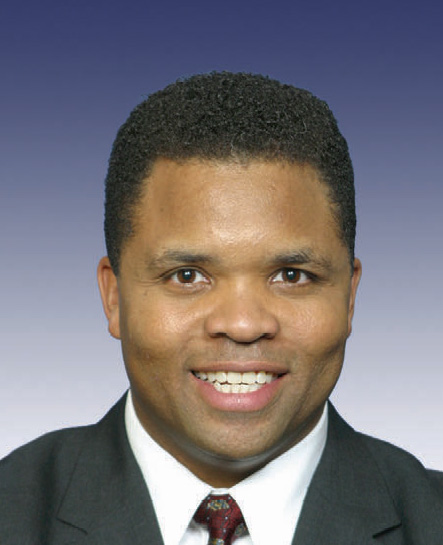

Nominee	Jesse Jackson Jr.	Stephanie Saylor
Party	Democratic	Libertarian
Popular vote	207,535	26,990
Percentage	88.5%	11.5%
- County results Jackson: 80–90% 90–100%
U.S. Representative before election
Jesse Jackson Jr.
Democratic
Elected U.S. Representative
Jesse Jackson Jr.
Democratic

=== Predictions ===
Source	Ranking	As of
The Cook Political Report	Safe D	October 29, 2004
Sabato's Crystal Ball	Safe D	November 1, 2004

=== Results ===
2004 Illinois's 2nd congressional district election
Party	Candidate	Votes	%
Democratic	Jesse Jackson Jr. (incumbent)	207,535	88.49
Libertarian	Stephanie Saylor	26,990	11.51
Total votes		234,525	100.0
Democratic hold			

== District 3 ==
2004 Illinois's 3rd congressional district election
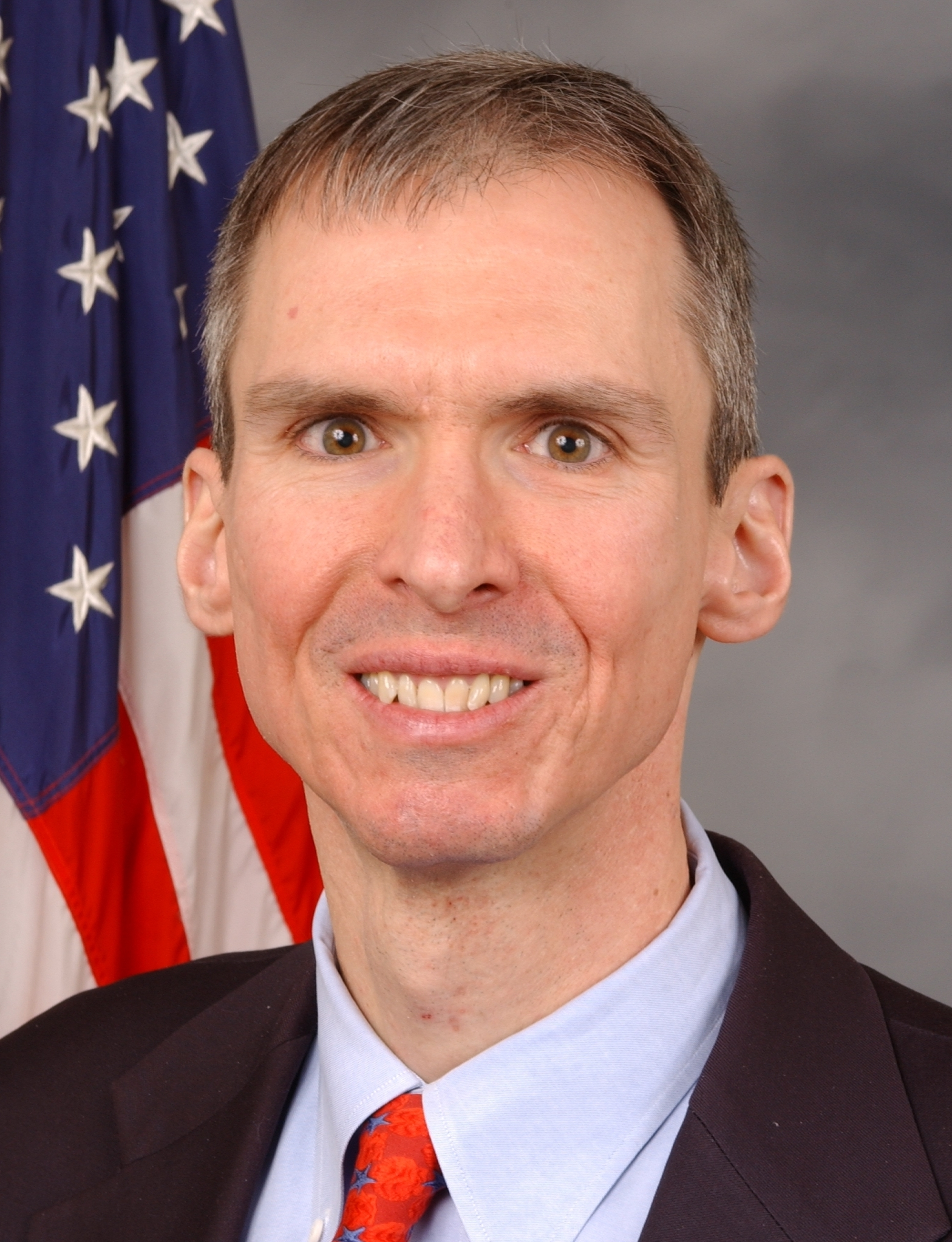

Nominee	Dan Lipinski	Ryan Chlada
Party	Democratic	Republican
Popular vote	167,034	57,845
Percentage	72.6%	25.1%
- County results Lipinski: 70–80%
U.S. Representative before election
Bill Lipinski
Democratic
Elected U.S. Representative
Dan Lipinski
Democratic

=== Predictions ===
Source	Ranking	As of
The Cook Political Report	Safe D	October 29, 2004
Sabato's Crystal Ball	Safe D	November 1, 2004

=== Results ===
2004 Illinois's 3rd congressional district election
Party	Candidate	Votes	%
Democratic	Dan Lipinski	167,034	72.64
Republican	Ryan Chlada	57,845	25.15
Independent	Krista Grimm	5,077	2.21
Total votes		229,956	100.0
Democratic hold			

== District 4 ==
2004 Illinois's 4th congressional district election
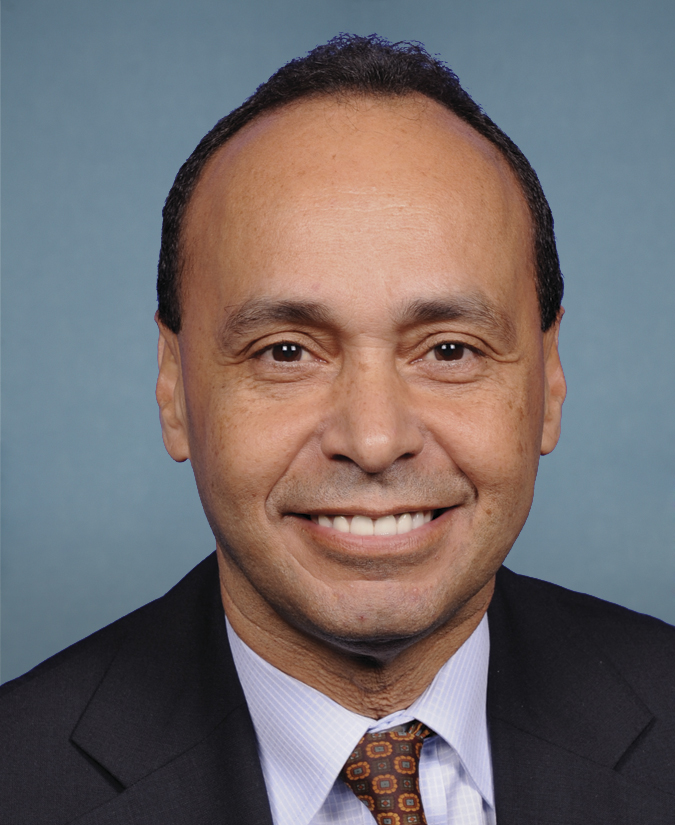

Nominee	Luis Gutiérrez	Tony Cisneros
Party	Democratic	Republican
Popular vote	104,761	15,536
Percentage	83.7%	12.4%
- County results Gutierrez: 80–90%
U.S. Representative before election
Luis Gutiérrez
Democratic
Elected U.S. Representative
Luis Gutiérrez
Democratic

=== Predictions ===
Source	Ranking	As of
The Cook Political Report	Safe D	October 29, 2004
Sabato's Crystal Ball	Safe D	November 1, 2004

=== Results ===
2004 Illinois's 4th congressional district election
Party	Candidate	Votes	%
Democratic	Luis Gutiérrez (incumbent)	104,761	83.71
Republican	Tony Cisneros	15,536	12.41
Libertarian	Jake Witmer	4,845	3.87
Total votes		125,142	100.0
Democratic hold			

== District 5 ==
2004 Illinois's 5th congressional district election
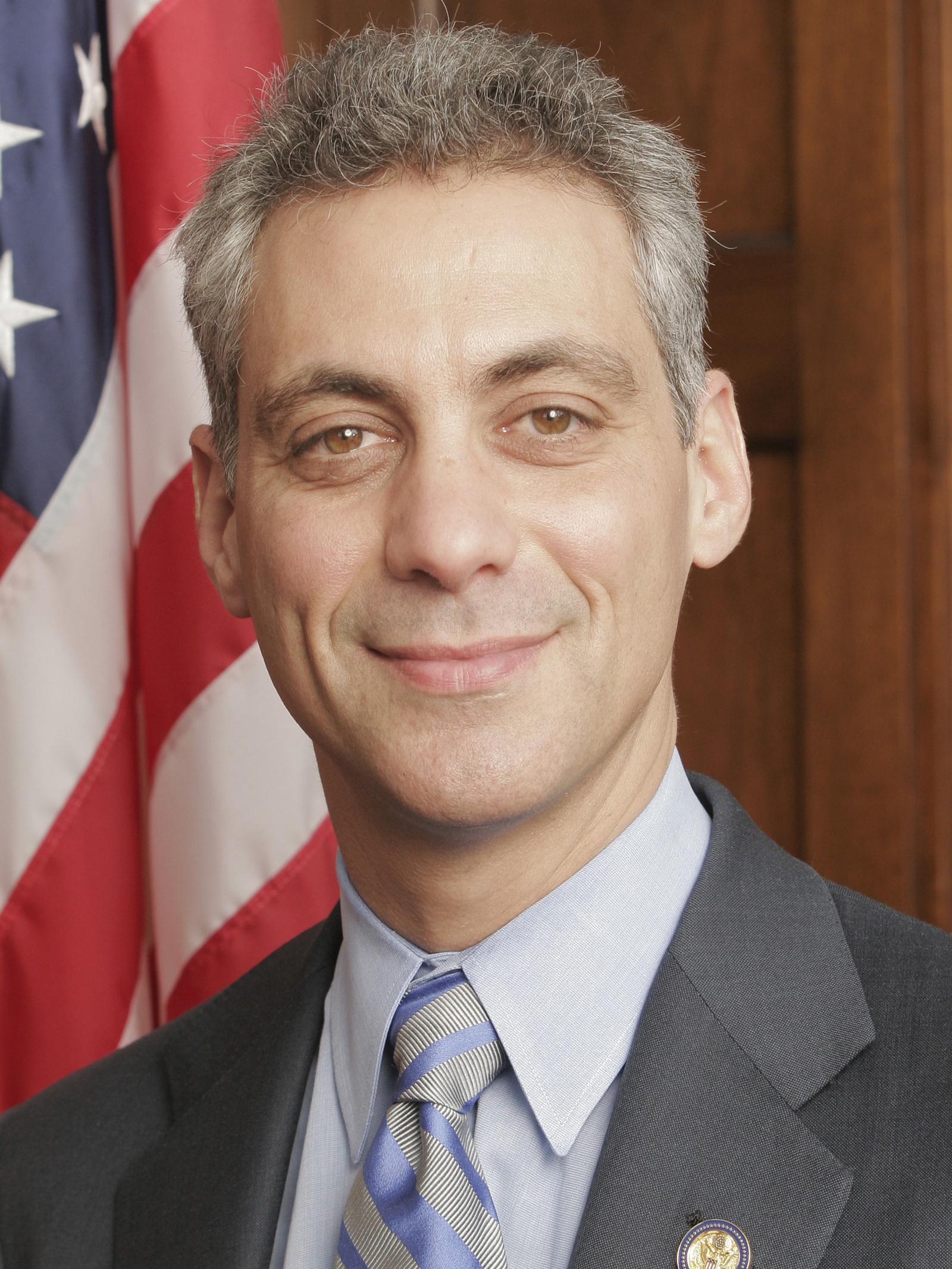

Nominee	Rahm Emanuel	Bruce Best
Party	Democratic	Republican
Popular vote	158,400	49,530
Percentage	76.2%	23.8%
- County results Emanuel: 70–80%
U.S. Representative before election
Rahm Emanuel
Democratic
Elected U.S. Representative
Rahm Emanuel
Democratic

=== Predictions ===
Source	Ranking	As of
The Cook Political Report	Safe D	October 29, 2004
Sabato's Crystal Ball	Safe D	November 1, 2004

=== Results ===
2004 Illinois's 5th congressional district election
Party	Candidate	Votes	%
Democratic	Rahm Emanuel (incumbent)	158,400	76.18
Republican	Bruce Best	49,530	23.82
Total votes		207,930	100.0
Democratic hold			

== District 6 ==
2004 Illinois's 6th congressional district election

Nominee	Henry Hyde	Christine Cegelis
Party	Republican	Democratic
Popular vote	139,627	110,470
Percentage	55.8%	44.2%
- County results Hyde: 50–60%
U.S. Representative before election
Henry Hyde
Republican
Elected U.S. Representative
Henry Hyde
Republican

=== Predictions ===
Source	Ranking	As of
The Cook Political Report	Safe R	October 29, 2004
Sabato's Crystal Ball	Safe R	November 1, 2004

=== Results ===
2004 Illinois's 6th congressional district election
Party	Candidate	Votes	%
Republican	Henry Hyde (incumbent)	139,627	55.83
Democratic	Christine Cegelis	110,470	44.17
Total votes		250,097	100.0
Republican hold			

== District 7 ==
2004 Illinois's 7th congressional district election
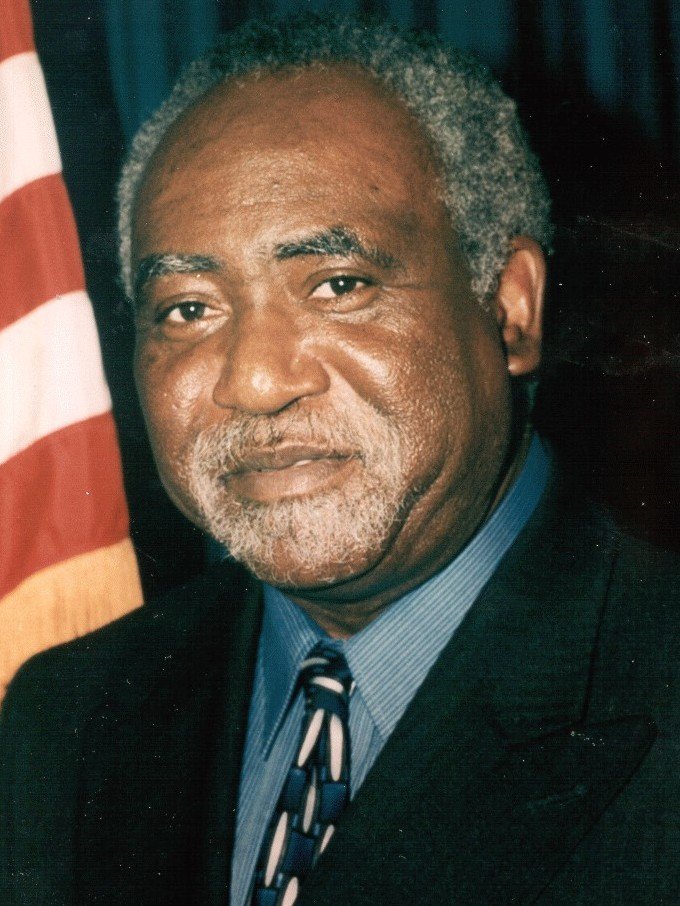

Nominee	Danny Davis	Antonio Davis-Fairman
Party	Democratic	Republican
Popular vote	221,133	35,603
Percentage	86.1%	13.9%
- County results Davis: 80–90%
U.S. Representative before election
Danny Davis
Democratic
Elected U.S. Representative
Danny Davis
Democratic

=== Predictions ===
Source	Ranking	As of
The Cook Political Report	Safe D	October 29, 2004
Sabato's Crystal Ball	Safe D	November 1, 2004

=== Results ===
2004 Illinois's 7th congressional district election
Party	Candidate	Votes	%
Democratic	Danny Davis (incumbent)	221,133	86.13
Republican	Antonio Davis-Fairman	35,603	13.87
Total votes		256,736	100.0
Democratic hold			

== District 8 ==
2004 Illinois's 8th congressional district election
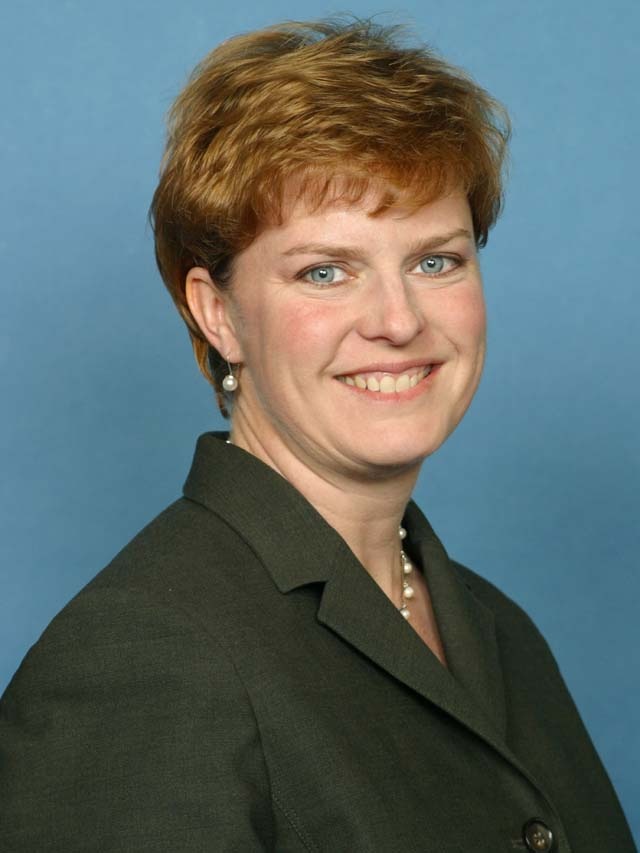

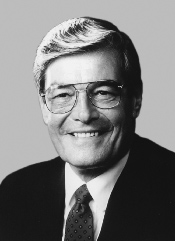
Nominee	Melissa Bean	Phil Crane
Party	Democratic	Republican
Popular vote	139,792	130,601
Percentage	51.7%	48.3%
- County results Bean: 50–60% Crane: 50–60%
U.S. Representative before election
Phil Crane
Republican
Elected U.S. Representative
Melissa Bean
Democratic

=== Predictions ===
Source	Ranking	As of
The Cook Political Report	Tossup	October 29, 2004
Sabato's Crystal Ball	Lean R	November 1, 2004

=== Results ===
2004 Illinois's 8th congressional district election
Party	Candidate	Votes	%
Democratic	Melissa Bean	139,792	51.70
Republican	Phil Crane (incumbent)	130,601	48.30
Total votes		270,393	100.0
Democratic gain from Republican			

== District 9 ==
2004 Illinois's 9th congressional district election
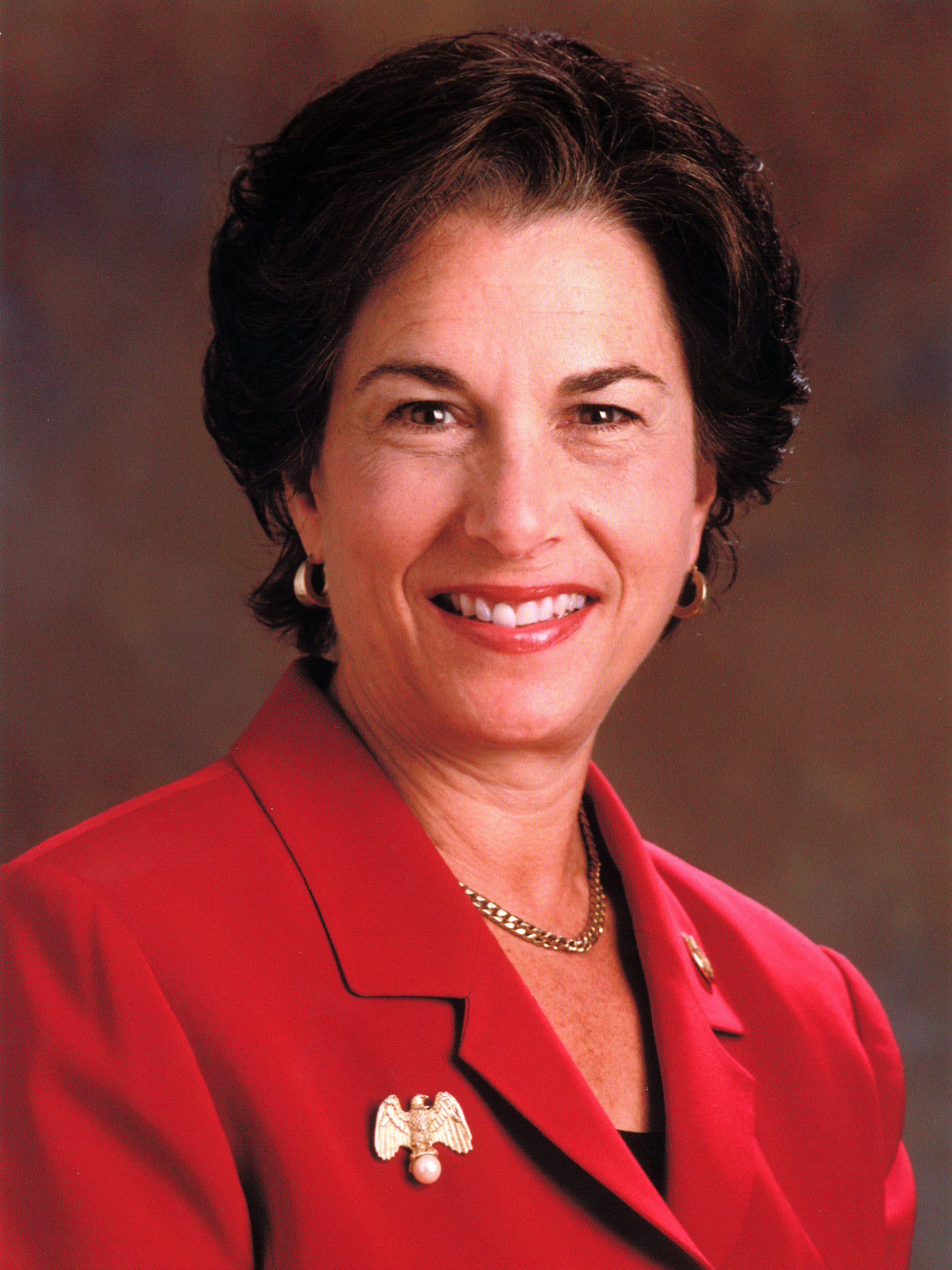

Nominee	Jan Schakowsky	Kurt Eckhardt
Party	Democratic	Republican
Popular vote	175,282	56,135
Percentage	75.7%	24.3%
- County results Schakowsky: 70–80%
U.S. Representative before election
Jan Schakowsky
Democratic
Elected U.S. Representative
Jan Schakowsky
Democratic

=== Predictions ===
Source	Ranking	As of
The Cook Political Report	Safe D	October 29, 2004
Sabato's Crystal Ball	Safe D	November 1, 2004

=== Results ===
2004 Illinois's 9th congressional district election
Party	Candidate	Votes	%
Democratic	Jan Schakowsky (incumbent)	175,282	75.74
Republican	Kurt Eckhardt	56,135	24.26
Total votes		231,417	100.0
Democratic hold			

== District 10 ==
2004 Illinois's 10th congressional district election
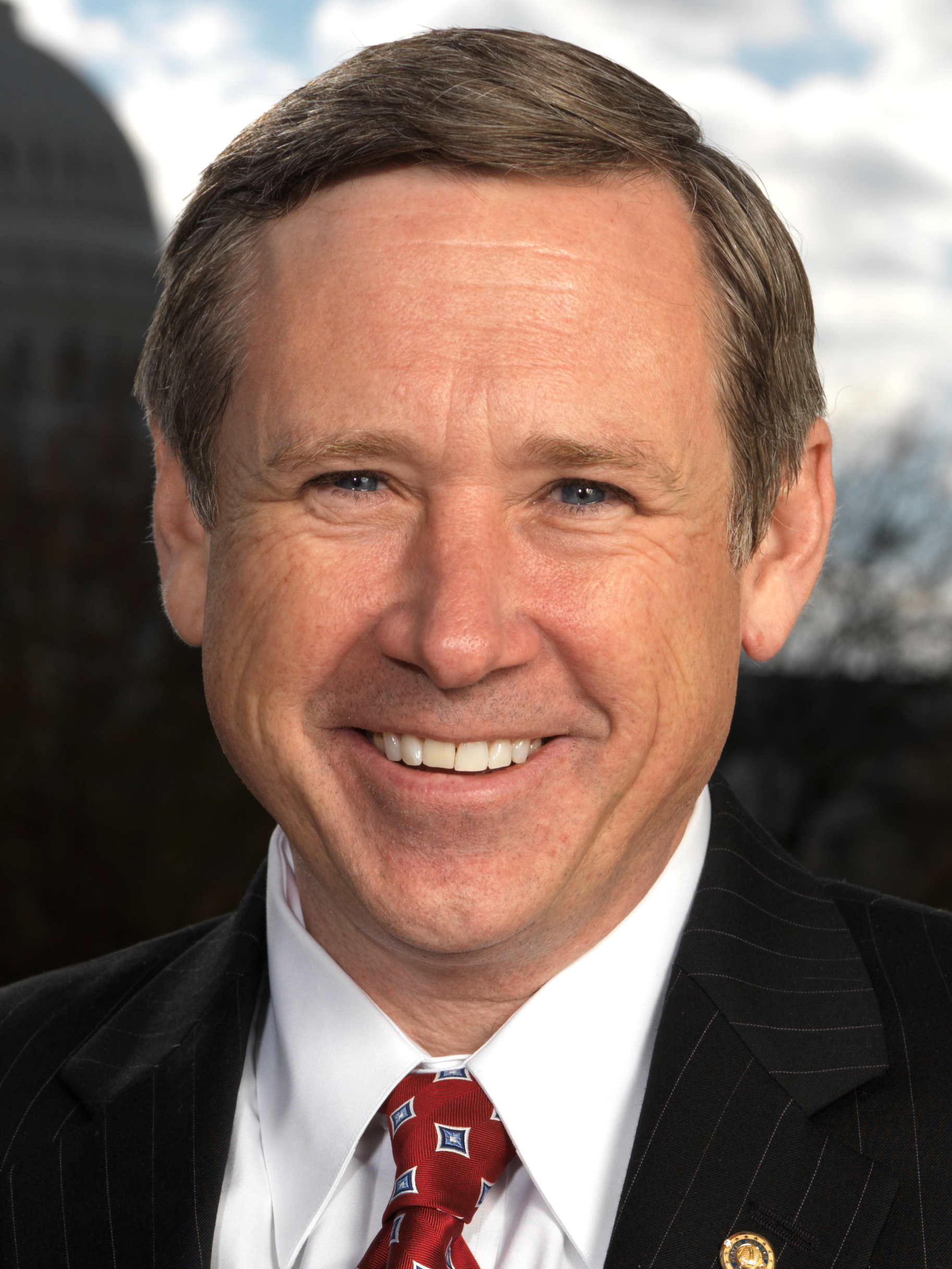

Nominee	Mark Kirk	Lee Goodman
Party	Republican	Democratic
Popular vote	177,493	99,218
Percentage	64.1%	35.9%
- County results Kirk: 60–70%
U.S. Representative before election
Mark Kirk
Republican
Elected U.S. Representative
Mark Kirk
Republican

=== Predictions ===
Source	Ranking	As of
The Cook Political Report	Safe R	October 29, 2004
Sabato's Crystal Ball	Safe R	November 1, 2004

=== Results ===
2004 Illinois's 10th congressional district election
Party	Candidate	Votes	%
Republican	Mark Kirk (incumbent)	177,493	64.14
Democratic	Lee Goodman	99,218	35.86
Total votes		276,711	100.0
Republican hold			

== District 11 ==
2004 Illinois's 11th congressional district election
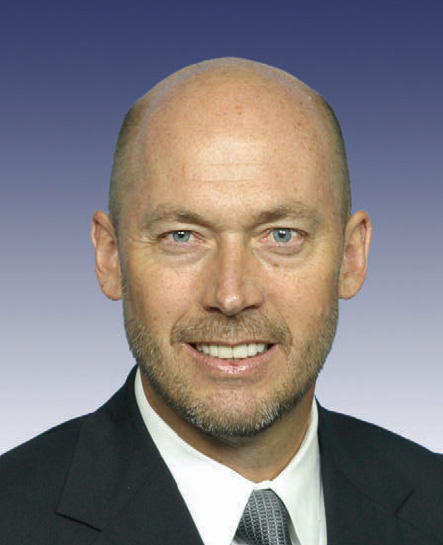

Nominee	Jerry Weller	Tari Renner
Party	Republican	Democratic
Popular vote	173,057	121,903
Percentage	58.7%	41.3%
- County results Weller: 50–60% 60–70% 70–80% Renner: 50–60%
U.S. Representative before election
Jerry Weller
Republican
Elected U.S. Representative
Jerry Weller
Republican

=== Predictions ===
Source	Ranking	As of
The Cook Political Report	Safe R	October 29, 2004
Sabato's Crystal Ball	Safe R	November 1, 2004

=== Results ===
2004 Illinois's 11th congressional district election
Party	Candidate	Votes	%
Republican	Jerry Weller (incumbent)	173,057	58.67
Democratic	Tari Renner	121,903	41.33
Total votes		294,960	100.0
Republican hold			

== District 12 ==
2004 Illinois's 12th congressional district election
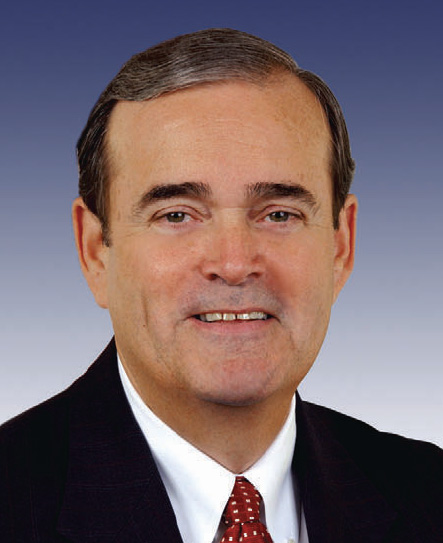

Nominee	Jerry Costello	Erin Zweigart
Party	Democratic	Republican
Popular vote	198,962	82,677
Percentage	69.5%	28.9%
- County results Costello: 50–60% 60–70% 70–80%
U.S. Representative before election
Jerry Costello
Democratic
Elected U.S. Representative
Jerry Costello
Democratic

=== Predictions ===
Source	Ranking	As of
The Cook Political Report	Safe D	October 29, 2004
Sabato's Crystal Ball	Safe D	November 1, 2004

=== Results ===
2004 Illinois's 12th congressional district election
Party	Candidate	Votes	%
Democratic	Jerry Costello (incumbent)	198,962	69.46
Republican	Erin Zweigart	82,677	28.86
Libertarian	Walter Steele	4,794	1.67
Write-in		2	0.00
Total votes		286,435	100.0
Democratic hold			

== District 13 ==
2004 Illinois's 13th congressional district election
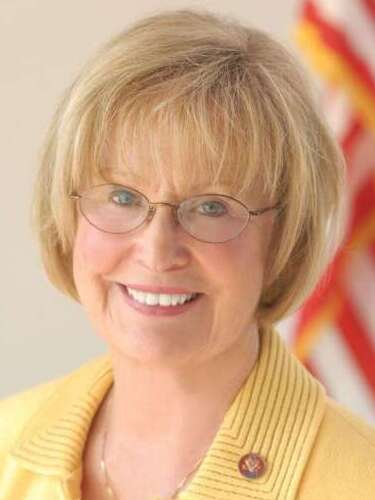

Nominee	Judy Biggert	Gloria Anderson
Party	Republican	Democratic
Popular vote	200,472	107,836
Percentage	65.0%	35.0%
- County results Biggert: 60–70%
U.S. Representative before election
Judy Biggert
Republican
Elected U.S. Representative
Judy Biggert
Republican

=== Predictions ===
Source	Ranking	As of
The Cook Political Report	Safe R	October 29, 2004
Sabato's Crystal Ball	Safe R	November 1, 2004

=== Results ===
2004 Illinois's 13th congressional district election
Party	Candidate	Votes	%
Republican	Judy Biggert (incumbent)	200,472	65.02
Democratic	Gloria Anderson	107,836	34.98
Write-in		4	0.00
Total votes		308,312	100.0
Republican hold			

== District 14 ==
2004 Illinois's 14th congressional district election
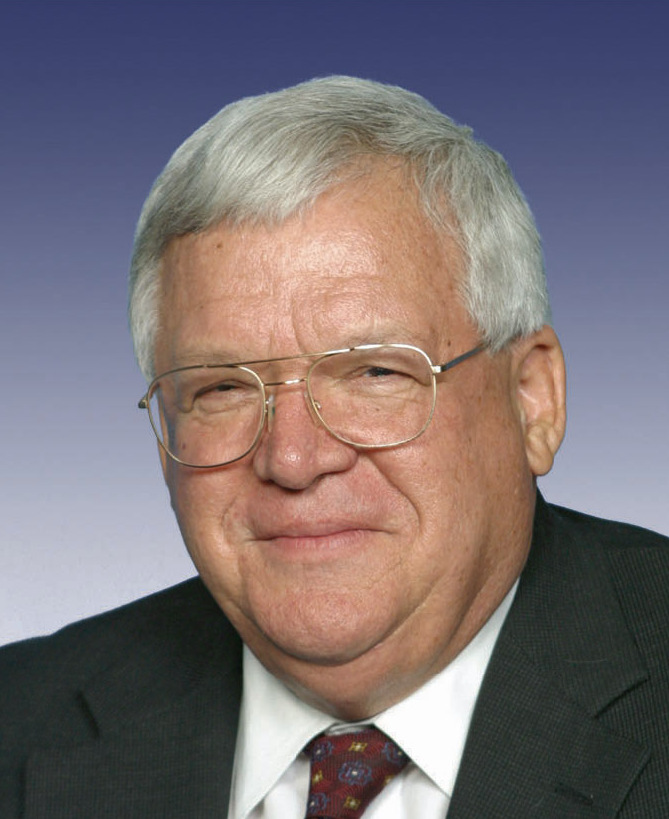

Nominee	Dennis Hastert	Ruben Zamora
Party	Republican	Democratic
Popular vote	191,618	87,590
Percentage	68.6%	31.4%
- County results Hastert: 50–60% 60–70% 70–80%
U.S. Representative before election
Dennis Hastert
Republican
Elected U.S. Representative
Dennis Hastert
Republican

=== Predictions ===
Source	Ranking	As of
The Cook Political Report	Safe R	October 29, 2004
Sabato's Crystal Ball	Safe R	November 1, 2004

=== Results ===
2004 Illinois's 14th congressional district election
Party	Candidate	Votes	%
Republican	Dennis Hastert (incumbent)	191,618	68.63
Democratic	Ruben Zamora	87,590	31.37
Total votes		279,208	100.0
Republican hold			

== District 15 ==
2004 Illinois's 15th congressional district election
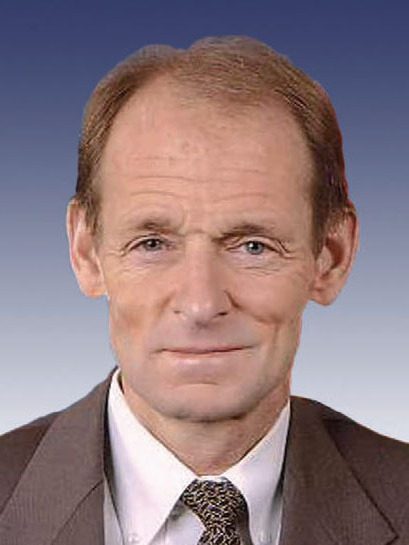

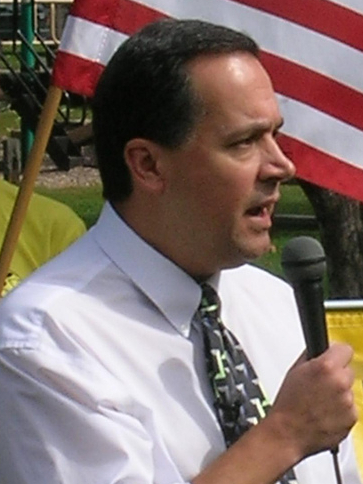
Nominee	Tim Johnson	David Gill
Party	Republican	Democratic
Popular vote	178,114	113,625
Percentage	61.0%	39.0%
- County results Johnson: 50–60% 60–70% 70–80% Gill: 50–60% 60–70%
U.S. Representative before election
Tim Johnson
Republican
Elected U.S. Representative
Tim Johnson
Republican

=== Predictions ===
Source	Ranking	As of
The Cook Political Report	Safe R	October 29, 2004
Sabato's Crystal Ball	Safe R	November 1, 2004

=== Results ===
2004 Illinois's 15th congressional district election
Party	Candidate	Votes	%
Republican	Tim Johnson (incumbent)	178,114	61.05
Democratic	David Gill	113,625	38.95
Total votes		291,739	100.0
Republican hold			

== District 16 ==
2004 Illinois's 16th congressional district election
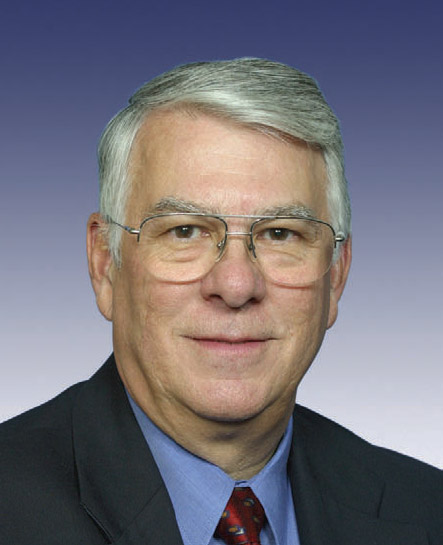

Nominee	Don Manzullo	John Kutsch
Party	Republican	Democratic
Popular vote	204,350	91,452
Percentage	69.1%	30.9%
- County results Manzullo: 60–70% 70–80%
U.S. Representative before election
Don Manzullo
Republican
Elected U.S. Representative
Don Manzullo
Republican

=== Predictions ===
Source	Ranking	As of
The Cook Political Report	Safe R	October 29, 2004
Sabato's Crystal Ball	Safe R	November 1, 2004

=== Results ===
2004 Illinois's 16th congressional district election
Party	Candidate	Votes	%
Republican	Don Manzullo (incumbent)	204,350	69.08
Democratic	John Kutsch	91,452	30.92
Write-in		4	0.00
Total votes		295,806	100.0
Republican hold			

== District 17 ==
2004 Illinois's 17th congressional district election
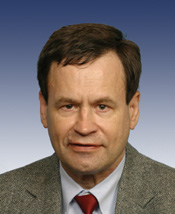

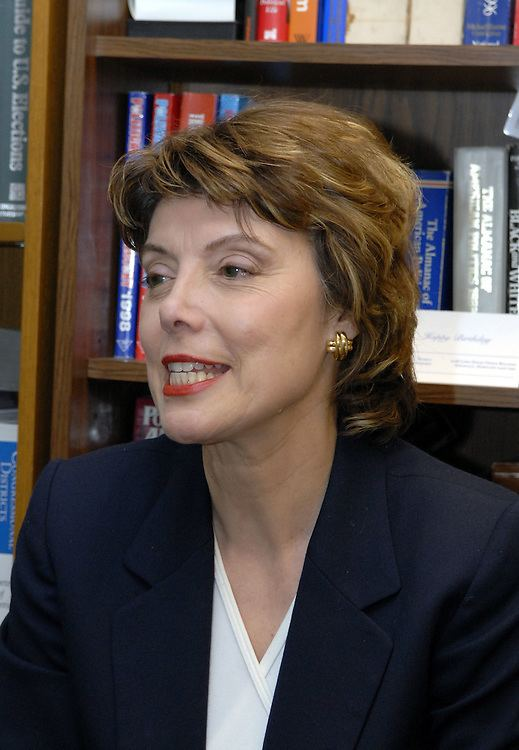
Nominee	Lane Evans	Andrea Zinga
Party	Democratic	Republican
Popular vote	172,320	111,680
Percentage	60.7%	39.3%
- County results Evans: 50–60% 60–70% Zinga: 50–60%
U.S. Representative before election
Lane Evans
Democratic
Elected U.S. Representative
Lane Evans
Democratic

=== Predictions ===
Source	Ranking	As of
The Cook Political Report	Safe D	October 29, 2004
Sabato's Crystal Ball	Safe D	November 1, 2004

=== Results ===
2004 Illinois's 17th congressional district election
Party	Candidate	Votes	%
Democratic	Lane Evans (incumbent)	172,320	60.68
Republican	Andrea Zinga	111,680	39.32
Total votes		284,000	100.0
Democratic hold			

== District 18 ==
2004 Illinois's 18th congressional district election
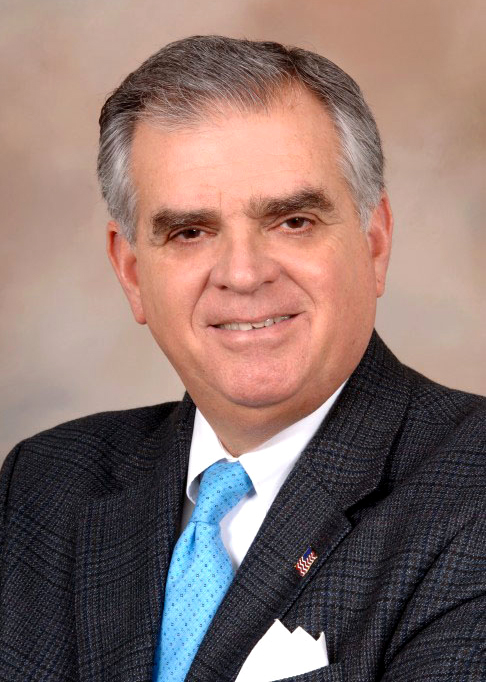

Nominee	Ray LaHood	Steve Waterworth
Party	Republican	Democratic
Popular vote	216,047	99,218
Percentage	70.2%	29.8%
- County results Lahood: 50–60% 60–70% 70–80% 80–90% Waterworth: 50–60%
U.S. Representative before election
Ray LaHood
Republican
Elected U.S. Representative
Ray LaHood
Republican

=== Predictions ===
Source	Ranking	As of
The Cook Political Report	Safe R	October 29, 2004
Sabato's Crystal Ball	Safe R	November 1, 2004

=== Results ===
2004 Illinois's 18th congressional district election
Party	Candidate	Votes	%
Republican	Ray LaHood (incumbent)	216,047	70.24
Democratic	Steve Waterworth	99,218	29.76
Total votes		307,595	100.0
Republican hold			

== District 19 ==
2004 Illinois's 19th congressional district election
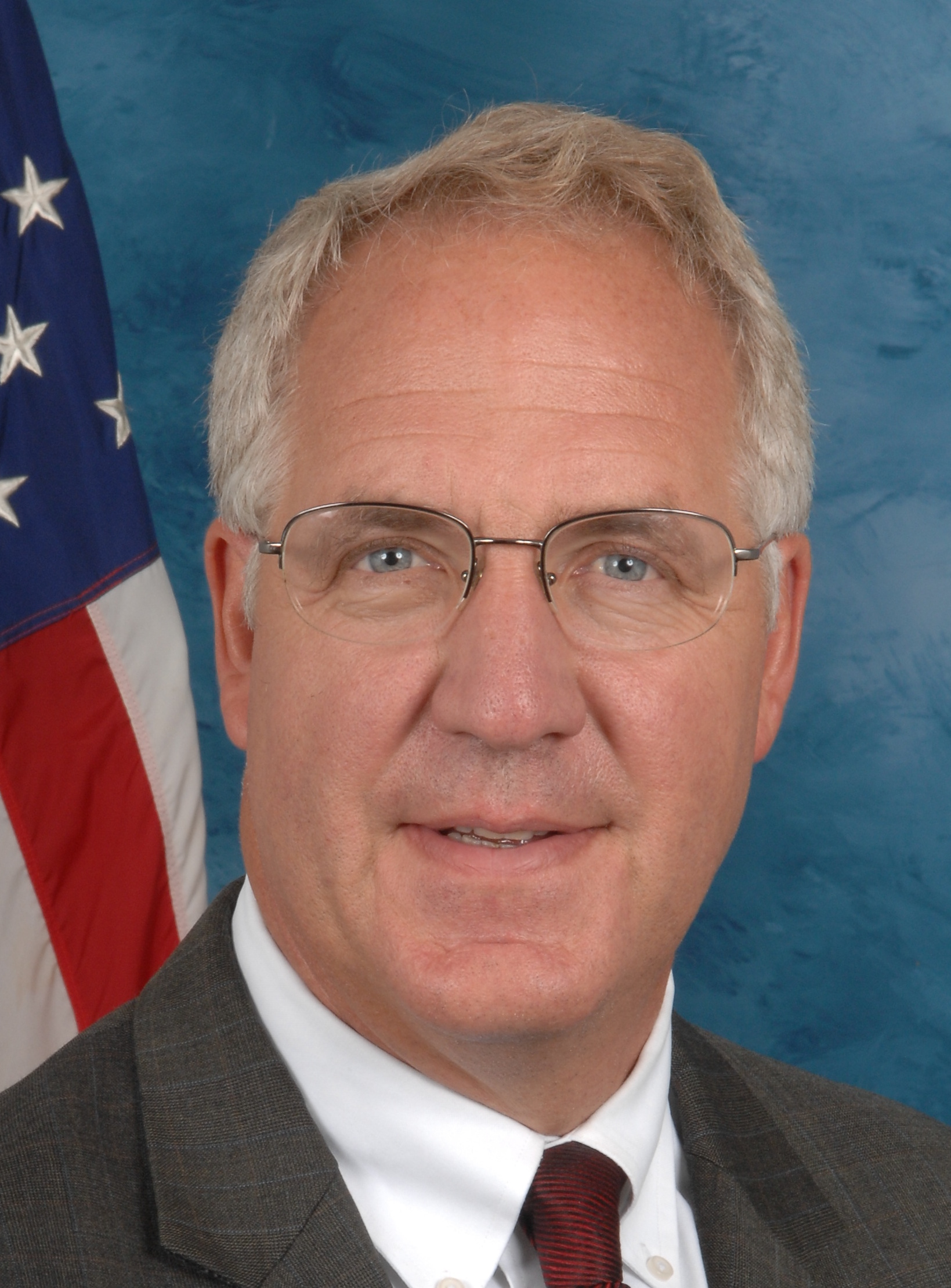

Nominee	John Shimkus	Tim Bagwell
Party	Republican	Democratic
Popular vote	213,451	94,303
Percentage	69.4%	30.6%
- County results Shimkus: 60–70% 70–80% Bagwell: 50–60%
U.S. Representative before election
John Shimkus
Republican
Elected U.S. Representative
John Shimkus
Republican

=== Predictions ===
Source	Ranking	As of
The Cook Political Report	Safe R	October 29, 2004
Sabato's Crystal Ball	Safe R	November 1, 2004

=== Results ===
2004 Illinois's 19th congressional district election
Party	Candidate	Votes	%
Republican	John Shimkus (incumbent)	213,451	69.36
Democratic	Tim Bagwell	94,303	30.64
Total votes		307,754	100.0
Republican hold			
