= Stephen Spangler =

American politician

Stephen Alan Spangler (born October 28, 1953) is an American politician who served one term in the Illinois House of Representatives.

== Biography ==
Stephen Alan Spangler was born October 28, 1953, in Joliet, Illinois. He has a Bachelor of Science from Northern Illinois University.

Spangler was a member of the Grundy County Board. In the 1994 general election, Spangler defeated Grundy County State's Attorney Dave Neal 19,204 votes to 11,333 votes.

As his predecessor, Jerry Weller, resigned early to be sworn into the United States House of Representatives from Illinois's 11th congressional district, Spangler was sworn on December 30, 1994, and assigned to the following committees: Committees on Environment & Energy; Health Care & Human Services; Judiciary-Criminal Law; Transportation & Motor Vehicles.

In the 1996 general election, Democratic candidate and attorney Mary K. O'Brien defeated Spangler 21,006 votes to 18,763 votes.
