= Mboka Mwilambwe =

Congolese-American politician (born 1970)

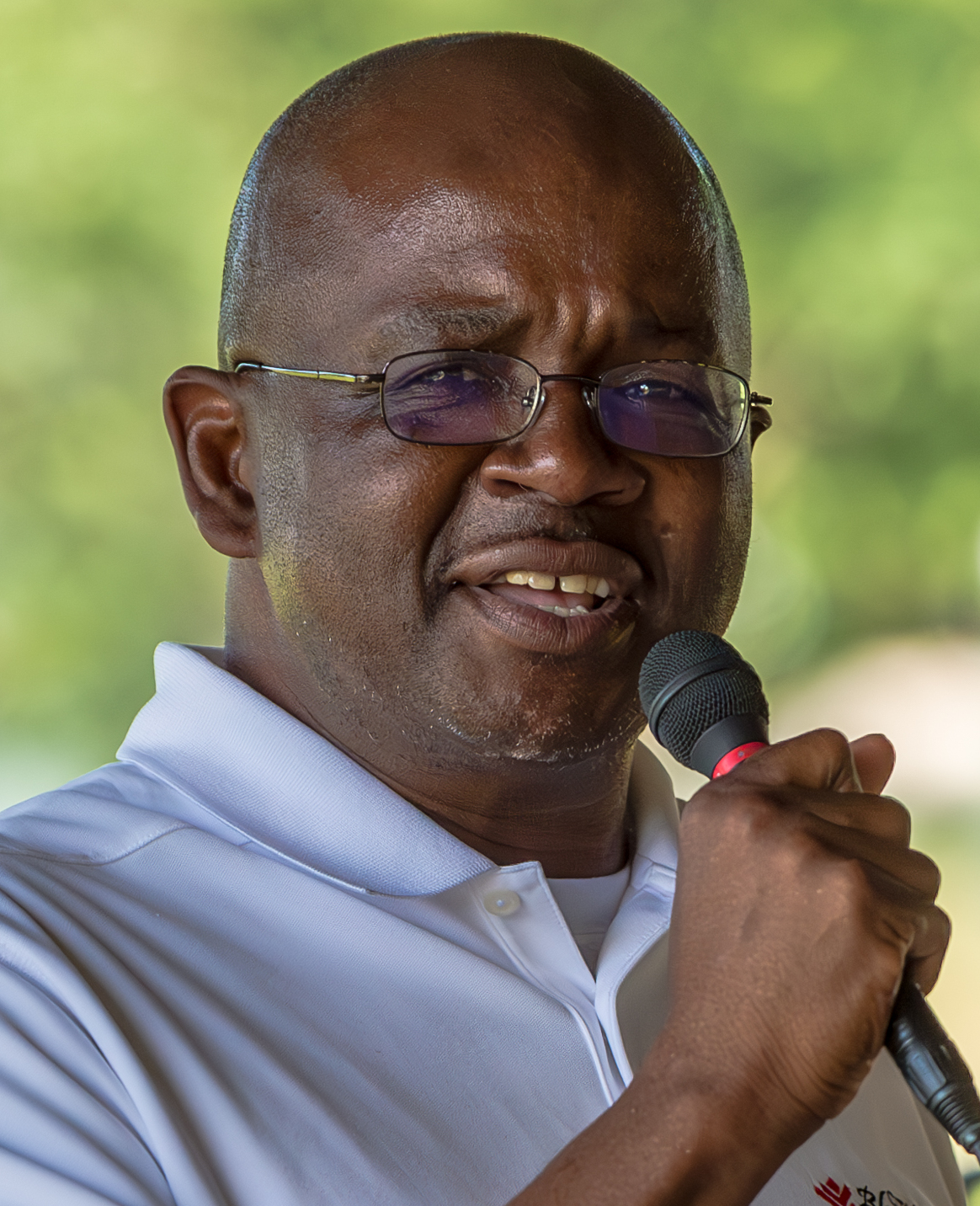
- Mboka Mwilambwe in 2023

Mayor of Bloomington, Illinois
- In office May 1, 2021 – May 1, 2025
- Preceded by: Tari Renner
- Succeeded by: Dan Brady

Bloomington City Council
- In office 2011–2021

Personal details
- Born: 1970 or 1971 (age 55–56) Kinshasa, Zaire
- Spouse: Stacey Mwilambwe
- Education: Illinois State University (BS, MS)

Mboka Mwilambwe (born 1970) is a Congolese-born American politician who was elected in 2021 as the first African-American mayor of Bloomington, Illinois.

== Biography ==
Mwilambwe was born in Kinshasa, Zaire during the dictatorship of Mobutu, one of seven children. His father worked for UNICEF and Mwilambwe lived in various countries as a youth with stays in Senegal, Ivory Coast, and the Republic of the Congo. In 1990, he moved to central Illinois to attend Illinois State University earning a B.S. in mathematics in 1994 and a M.S. in education in 1996. After school, he accepted a position as the assistant director of the Office of Equal Access and Opportunity at Illinois State University. In 2008, he became a U.S. Citizen. In 2011, he was appointed by then-mayor Steve Stockton to fill a vacancy in Ward 3 on the Bloomington City Council. He was re-elected to a full four-year term on the City Council in 2013 and 2017. Since 2019, he has served as mayor pro tem.

In 2021, he ran for mayor against Mike Straza, Jackie Gunderson, and write-in candidate Misty Metroz. On April 6, 2021, he very narrowly won the election succeeding Tari Renner, who did not seek a third term as mayor. He was sworn in on May 1, 2021 becoming Bloomington's first African-American mayor since its founding in 1830. (In 2019, Bloomington was 73.0% white, 10.2% Black, 8.0% Asian, 6.1% Latino, and 2.2% multi-racial). Top items on his agenda include an emphasis on infrastructure, improving financial efficiency, and facilitating an atmosphere where people can debate in a civil manner.

In 2021, he helped to secure the opening of a $214 million manufacturing plant by Italian candymaker Ferrero SpA which is expected to add 200 jobs, launched a $20 million expansion of the Bloomington Public Library, secured the construction of an Aldi store on the west side and a new YMCA on the east side, and accelerated sewer expansion and replacement after record rain. In October 2022, he merged the operations of the Grossinger Motors Arena and the Bloomington Center for the Performing Arts to help stem continuing losses. In April 2023, he testified before the Illinois House Cities and Villages Committee to restore the state income tax revenue sharing program with local municipalities (known as the Local Government Distributive Fund) to the prior level of 10.0% from the current 6.16%. In May 2023, Mwilambwe was named by Governor J. B. Pritzker to serve on the Illinois Workforce Innovation Board.

Mwilambwe announced in April 2024 he was running for re-election. He was challenged by former Illinois State Representative Dan Brady. and incumbent city councilman Alderman Cody Hendricks. He lost re-election, placing behind both Brady and Hendricks, with 19% to Brady's 48% and Hendrick's 33%.

== Personal life ==
Mwilambwe is married to fellow Illinois State University graduate Stacey Mwilambwe (B.S. ’94, M.S. ’96) who is the director of University Housing Services. He speaks French, English, Swahili and Lingala. He also has four children Maya, Mariama, Amélie, and Jonah.

== Electoral history ==
2021 Bloomington Illinois Mayoral Election
Candidate	Votes	%	±
Mboka Mwilambwe	4,487	38.72	N/A
Mike Straza	4,279	36.92	N/A
Jackie Gunderson	2,798	24.14	N/A
Write-in	25	0.22%	−0.1
Total votes	11,589	100.0%	N/A

2025 Bloomington Illinois Mayoral Election
Candidate	Votes	%	±
Dan Brady	8,056	47.73	N/A
Cody Hendricks	5,641	33.42	N/A
Mboka Mwilambwe (Incumbent)	3,181	18.85	N/A
Total votes	16,878	100.0%	N/A

== See also ==
- List of mayors of Bloomington, Illinois
- List of first African-American mayors
