= Thomas J. Homer =

American politician

Illinois Legislative Inspector General
- In office 2004–2014
- Preceded by: Office created
- Succeeded by: J. William Roberts

Judge on the Illinois Appellate Court from the 3rd district
- In office 1996–2002
- Preceded by: John F. Michela
- Succeeded by: Mary K. O'Brien

Member of the Illinois House of Representatives from the 91st district
- In office 1983–1995
- Preceded by: District created
- Succeeded by: Michael K. Smith

Fulton County State's Attorney
- In office 1976–1982
- Preceded by: Robert Downs
- Succeeded by: Joan C. Scott

Personal details
- Born: January 12, 1947 (age 79) Canton, Illinois, U.S.
- Party: Democratic
- Education: University of Illinois; Chicago-Kent College of Law

Thomas J. Homer (born January 12, 1947) is an American politician from Illinois who served as a Democratic member of the Illinois House of Representatives and later as a judge and the first Legislative Inspector General.

== Early life and career ==
Thomas J. Homer was born January 12, 1947, in Canton, Illinois. Homer graduated from Canton High School. He then earned a political science degree at University of Illinois at Urbana–Champaign where he was also a member of the Army Reserve Officers' Training Corps. He served in the United States Army Reserve until 1978, receiving an honorable discharge as a First Lieutenant. He earned a juris doctor from Chicago-Kent College of Law. Upon his graduation from law school in 1974, Homer served as Assistant State's Attorney in Lake County, Illinois. Two years later, he moved back to Canton to run for State's Attorney in Fulton County, Illinois; he won. In 1976, Homer was elected as the Fulton County State's Attorney and was re-elected in 1980.

== Illinois House of Representatives ==
In the 1982 election, Homer ran as the Democratic candidate against Republican candidate Thomas C. Schrepfer, a physician from Havana, Illinois, on a platform of lowering unemployment, fixing deteriorating roads, and helping local school finances. Homer was elected and represented the 91st district for six terms.

From 1982 to 1994, Homer served six terms in the Illinois House of Representatives, as a Democrat of the 91st District which comprises parts of Fulton, Mason, Peoria, Tazewell counties in Central Illinois. At various points during his six terms, he served as Chairman of the House Judiciary Committee and Majority Floor Leader. He also maintained a private law practice in Canton, Illinois, engaging in the general practice of law, including estate planning, real estate law, criminal defense, and civil litigation. Homer tried a number of jury cases as a plaintiff's lawyer and criminal defense attorney.

In 1986, he was mentioned as a potential candidate for Lieutenant Governor of Illinois, but opted to run for reelection. In 1990, Homer and fellow Democrat Bill Edley, were opponents of the decision to rebury the unearthed remains of Native Americans found at Dickson Mounds unburied.

In the 1994 United States House of Representatives elections, Homer ran for the Democratic nomination to succeed Robert H. Michel, the retiring House Minority Leader. However, Homer lost the primary to trial lawyer, G. Douglas Stephens, who previously ran competitive elections against Michel in 1982 and in 1988. Ray LaHood, a former State Representative and Michel's Chief of Staff, won the election. Homer was succeeded in the Illinois House by Michael K. Smith.

== Judgeship ==
In 1995, Judge Allan Strouder died in office. In the 1996 election, Homer was the Democratic nominee to fill the remainder of Strouder’s term. Homer defeated Republican candidate John F. Michela, who was originally appointed to the vacancy created by Allan Strouder’s death. From 1996 to 2002, Homer was elected to serve as an Illinois Appellate Court Judge of the Third District, presiding over appeals by litigants from trial court decisions throughout a 21-county jurisdiction in North Central Illinois. During this time, Homer authored numerous written judicial decisions, opinions that serve as legal precedent throughout the State of Illinois. And he was twice elected by his fellow justices to serve as the Presiding Justice of the Court.

He stepped down from the bench in 2002 and founded The Homer Law Firm in 2004. The Homer Law Firm in Naperville, Illinois focuses on estate planning, asset protection, probate, trust administration, and civil mediation. As a Certified Financial Planner, he also advises clients concerning wealth accumulation and wealth preservation strategies. Homer serves as an instructor at the Estate Retirement Planning Seminars sponsored by the Illinois State Retirement System (SRS) and Judicial Retirement System (JRS).

== Legislative Inspector General ==
In 2004, Homer was appointed the first Illinois Legislative Inspector General. In 2008, Homer retained as Inspector General for another term to end June 30, 2013. In this role, he investigated allegations of misconduct and ethics violations filed against members of the Illinois General Assembly and its employees. He also oversaw ethics training and provided ethics guidance to members of the General Assembly.

== Post-legislative career ==
Homer was appointed by Governor Bruce Rauner to the Illinois Board of Examiners on March 24, 2017. The Board of Examiners adopts and prescribes rules and regulations for fair and impartial methods of determining the qualifications of applicants for examination to become a Certified Public Accountant. He was reappointed on August 24, 2018, for a term expiring July 31, 2021.
