= Tari Renner =

American politician and academic

Mayor of Bloomington, Illinois
- In office May 1, 2013 – May 1, 2021
- Preceded by: Steve Stockton
- Succeeded by: Mboka Mwilambwe

Personal details
- Born: Miami Beach, Florida
- Party: Democratic
- Children: 2
- Education: University of South Florida (B.A.); American University (M.A., Ph.D.)
- Profession: Political Scientist

Tari Renner is an American politician and academic. He was the Mayor of Bloomington, Illinois, from 2013 to 2021, and a professor of political science at Illinois Wesleyan University.

== Academic career ==
Renner earned a Bachelor of Arts degree in political science from the University of South Florida in 1978 and his masters and doctorate degrees from American University School of Public Affairs. In 1994, he became chair of the political science department at Illinois Wesleyan University. He served as department chair 1994-2003 and again 2005-2008. Prior to teaching at Illinois Wesleyan he taught at Washington College and Duquesne University with a brief hiatus from academia to work as the Director of Research for the International City/County Management Association.

According to his official biography, he has published thirty articles and books. He has been cited in the Chicago Tribune twice; first on the 1995 Chicago mayoral election and later when Condoleezza Rice stumped for George W. Bush in Illinois' North Shore during the 2000 election.

== Political career ==
In 1998, Renner was elected to the McLean County Board. In 2004, Renner was the Democratic candidate for Illinois's 11th congressional district against Republican incumbent Jerry Weller. The district, at that time, included Kankakee, Will, Grundy, LaSalle, and Bureau counties and the Bloomington–Normal area. Renner received 121,819 votes to Weller's 172,975 votes.

In 2009, Renner ran for Mayor of Bloomington against Steve Stockton. During the election he was endorsed by Senator Dick Durbin. Stockton won by a margin of 15 votes. Renner resigned from the county board in January 2010 as he moved to another part of Bloomington. He was appointed to the McLean County Regional Planning Commission.

In 2013, he won a three-way race with 51% of the vote (John Hanson received 36% and Lex Green received 13%).

In 2017, he was reelected with 48% of the vote in a 5 candidate race and then 57% in the runoff between the top two vote getters.

In both elections voter turnout was less than 20%.

After the United States withdrawal from the Paris Agreement, Renner and Chris Koos, the Mayor of Normal, Illinois, signed a commitment to follow through on the goals of the Paris Agreement. Renner endorsed Daniel Biss for the Governor of Illinois in the 2018 election.

A citizen complaint was filed against Mayor Renner regarding a plane ticket on the Sister City trip to Japan of 2017. All of the trip arrangements were made by city staff and were never put on the Mayor's city credit card, but was put on another city credit card. His partner Margot Ehrlich was on the trip and reimbursed the City over two months before the trip began. However, for complicated technical reasons an investigation was triggered by Illinois State Police for the use of a staff credit card to purchase the plane ticket for Ms. Ehrlich (who was an "official" member of the Sister City delegation based upon the Sister Cities' official report representing University High School and Metcalf Elementary, she also met with administrative officials to further the educational relationships between the two cities).

In October 2020, Renner announced he would not seek a third term in 2021. He was succeeded by former councilman Mboka Mwilambwe.

=== Controversies ===
In February 2015 (2-21-15) Renner was rebuked by the council (9-0) in a resolution as a result of a response to a blogger who mentioned his adult son.

At the city council meeting of October 23, 2017, a second letter of rebuke was given to the Mayor by six aldermen because Renner referred to a complainant as "crazy" and "pathetic."

In May 2019, Renner made a comment about Clarence Thomas in a public open house discussion where he claimed "Clarence Thomas does not act much like an African American". This comment referred to Thomas' deciding vote to declare the pre-clearance of the Voting Rights Act unconstitutional (a 5–4 vote). Some considered the comment in poor taste. Several weeks later, a member of the Illinois Black Chamber of Commerce, Cornel Darden from Joliet was recruited by regional right-wing bloggers. He addressed Renner for his comment during the public comment part of a city council meeting June 2019.

== Electoral history ==
https://results.enr.clarityelections.com/IL/Bloomington/66841/185906/en/summary.html

2017 Bloomington Illinois Mayoral Election
Candidate	Votes	%	±
Tari Renner	6,068	56.44	+4.94
Kevin G Lower	4,650	43.25	N/A
Write-in	34	0.32%	N/A
Total votes	10,752	100.0%	N/A

https://results.enr.clarityelections.com/IL/Bloomington/46028/116387/en/summary.html

2013 Bloomington Illinois Mayoral Election
Candidate	Votes	%	±
Tari Renner	5,005	51.50	+10.11
John Hanson	3,466	35.66	N/A
Lex Green	1,248	12.84	N/A
Total votes	9,719	100.0%	N/A

https://results.enr.clarityelections.com/IL/Bloomington/10444/15505/en/summary.html

2009 Bloomington Illinois Mayoral Election
Candidate	Votes	%	±
Stephen F. Stockton	3,569	41.57	N/A
Tari Renner	3,554	41.39	N/A
Eric Decossas	1,463	17.04	N/A
Total votes	8,586	100.0%	N/A

== See also ==
- List of mayors of Bloomington, Illinois
