= Michael K. Smith (Illinois politician) =

American politician (1966–2014)

Member of the Illinois House of Representatives from the 91st district
- In office January 1995 – January 2011
- Preceded by: Thomas J. Homer
- Succeeded by: Michael D. Unes

Personal details
- Born: May 23, 1966 Canton, Illinois
- Died: August 9, 2014 (aged 48) Canton, Illinois
- Party: Democratic
- Spouse: Donna Shaw (m. 1991–2014)
- Education: Bradley University (B.A.)

Michael K. Smith (May 23, 1966 – August 9, 2014) was a Democratic member of the Illinois House of Representatives, representing the 91st District from 1995 until 2011.

== Early life and career ==
Smith was born May 23, 1966, in Canton, Illinois. From 1991 until 1994, Smith was a township trustee in Canton Township.

== Illinois House of Representatives ==
In the 1994 general election, Smith won election to the Illinois House of Representatives in the 91st district. The 91st district, at that time, included portions of Fulton, Knox, and Peoria counties in western Illinois. He succeeded Thomas J. Homer for whom he served as a legislative assistant after the former vacated the seat to run for Congress.

In the 2001 decennial redistricting process, the Knox County portion of the district was removed and portions of Tazewell County were added. Smith was defeated in his bid for re-election in the 2010 general election by Republican Michael D. Unes, then a member of the City Council of East Peoria, Illinois.

Smith served as the Chairman of the Fulton County Democratic Party from 1999 until 2008.

== Post-legislative life ==
In 2011, he was appointed to the Illinois Educational Labor Relations Board. He was confirmed for a permanent seat on the Board by the Illinois State Senate on a vote of 33–21. He was sponsored for the post by Illinois State Senator David Koehler, D-Peoria, who had served in the Illinois State Legislature alongside then-Representative Smith.

Smith died on August 9, 2014, of a heart attack. On December 2, 2014, Jehan Gordon-Booth and Michael D. Unes introduced a resolution honoring Smith. It passed the next day.
