= List of mayors of Bloomington, Illinois =

Mayor of Bloomington
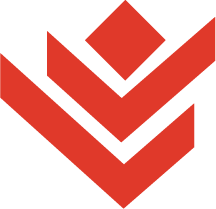
- Logo of Bloomington
- Incumbent; Dan Brady since 2025
- Formation: 1850
- First holder: David I. Perry

The following is a list of mayors of the city of Bloomington, Illinois, United States.

- David I. Perry, 1850
- Charles P. Merriman, 1851
- John H. Wickizer, 1852
- William Wallace, 1853
- John W. Ewing, 1854
- Franklin Price, 1855–1856
- Amasa J. Merriman, 1857–1858, 1863
- John M. Stillwell, 1859, 1868–1869
- H. S. Herr, 1860
- George W. Parke, 1861–1862
- Joel Depew, 1864
- E. H. Rood, 1865–1867, 1880
- T. J. Bunn, 1870, 1877
- Benjamin Franklin Funk, 1871–1875, 1884–1885
- John Reed, 1876, c.1878–1879
- E. B. Steere, 1878
- John W. Trotter, 1881–1883
- Lewis B. Thomas, 1886–1888, 1900–1903
- J. R. Mason, 1889–1890
- C. F. Koch 1891, 1898–1899
- Daniel T. Foster, 1892–1894, 1897
- G. M. Smith, 1895
- Edgar M. Heafer, 1896
- George C. Morrison, 1904–1905
- James Neville, 1905–1906
- A. G. Erickson, 1906–1907
- Edward Holland 1907–1909
- Richard L. Carlock, 1909–1911
- Albert L. Moore, 1911–1913
- James Costello, 1913–1915
- Edward E. Jones, 1915–1923
- Frank E. Shorthose, c.1923
- Ben S. Rhodes, c.1931
- Bob McGraw, 1958–1969
- Walt Bittner, 1970–1976
- Richard Buchanan, 1977–1984
- Jesse Smart, 1985–1997
- Judy Markowitz, 1997–2005
- Steve Stockton, 2005–2013
- Tari Renner, 2013–2021
- Mboka Mwilambwe, 2021–2025
- Dan Brady, 2025–present

== See also ==
- Bloomington history
