= Robert L. Carter (Illinois judge) =

American judge

Robert Carter

Justice of the Illinois Supreme Court
- In office December 8, 2020 – December 5, 2022
- Preceded by: Thomas L. Kilbride
- Succeeded by: Mary Kay O'Brien

Personal details
- Born: February 26, 1946 (age 80) Springfield, Illinois, U.S.
- Party: Democratic
- Spouse: Nancy Rink
- Children: 2
- Education: University of Illinois, Urbana-Champaign (BA, JD); University of Illinois, Springfield (MA)

Military service
- Allegiance: United States
- Branch/service: United States Army
- Years of service: 1969–1970

Robert L. Carter (born February 26, 1946) is a former justice of the Illinois Supreme Court. Carter was sworn in on December 8, 2020, and left office on December 5, 2022. He is the son-in-law of former Judge and Representative Paul E. Rink

== Early life and education ==
Carter was a childhood resident of Grandview, Illinois. His father worked as a coal miner and his mother worked in a munitions factory during World War II. Carter received both his Bachelor of Arts from the University of Illinois at Urbana-Champaign, his Juris Doctor from the University of Illinois College of Law, and his Master of Arts from Sangamon State University.

== Military service ==
From 1969 to 1970, Carter served in the United States Army during the Vietnam War.

== State court service ==
=== Illinois circuit court service ===
The Illinois Supreme Court appointed Carter an associate judge for Illinois's 13th circuit for a term beginning July 2, 1979. He was elected a circuit court judge in 1988 and became the chief judge in 1992.

=== Illinois Appellate Court service ===
Carter was appointed to the Illinois Appellate Court upon the retirement of Tobias Barry for a term beginning September 1, 2006. He was succeeded as resident circuit judge by then-State's Attorney Joseph P. Hettel.

=== Illinois Supreme Court ===
In the 2020 general election, incumbent Justice Thomas L. Kilbride received approximately 56% of the vote in favor of his retention, which is less than the supermajority of 60% required by state law to be retained. After Kilbride lost retention, the Illinois Supreme Court appointed Carter as a placeholder until the 2022 general election. Carter's term began on December 6, 2020. He left office on December 5, 2022, when his successor was sworn in.

Legal offices
Preceded by Thomas L. Kilbride	Associate Justice of the Supreme Court of Illinois; 2020–2022	Succeeded by Mary Kay O'Brien
