= Mark Curran =

American lawyer

Sheriff of Lake County
- In office December 2006 – December 2018
- Preceded by: Gary Del Re
- Succeeded by: John Idleburg

Personal details
- Born: April 4, 1963 (age 63) Pittsburgh, Pennsylvania, U.S.
- Party: Democratic (before 2008); Republican (2008–present)
- Education: Spring Hill College (BA); Illinois Institute of Technology (JD)

Mark C. Curran Jr. (born April 4, 1963) is an American attorney who served as Sheriff of Lake County, Illinois from 2006 to 2018. He was the Republican nominee in the 2020 United States Senate election in Illinois, losing to incumbent Democratic Party incumbent Dick Durbin. In 2022, he ran as the Republican nominee for the 2nd district seat on the Illinois Supreme Court, losing to Democratic Party nominee Elizabeth Rochford.

== Early life and education ==
Curran graduated from Loyola Academy in Wilmette, Illinois. He earned a Bachelor of Arts in business from Spring Hill College, and a Juris Doctor from the Illinois Institute of Technology's Chicago-Kent College of Law. Curran attended law enforcement and leadership courses at Boston University and Northwestern University.

== Career ==
Curran began his career as a state prosecutor in Lake County in 1990, rising to Senior Felony Prosecutor. He then served as a prosecutor with the Illinois Attorney General from 1999 to 2002. In 2002, Curran went into private practice, concentrating in civil and criminal litigation.

=== 2006 election for sheriff ===
Curran won the Democratic Party's primary election for the position of Sheriff of Lake County, Illinois on March 21, 2006, and won the general election for that position in November 2006, defeating incumbent Gary Del Re. In his elections and in his role as Sheriff, Curran has called for prison reform in Illinois, in which he includes a call for faith-based programming in prisons. In August 2008, Curran made national news when he voluntarily spent a week in the Lake County Jail.

On December 15, 2008, Curran announced that he was switching from the Democratic to Republican Party, calling his decision a "matter of conscience", stating that the scandals of Democratic governor Rod Blagojevich played a role in his decision.

=== 2018 election for sheriff ===
After apparent defeat in the 2018 general election by a margin of 137 votes, by challenger John Idleburg, Curran requested and lost a recount. The day following the announcement of this result, Curran announced his intention to seek the Republican nomination for the 2020 Illinois U.S. Senate Election.

=== 2020 U.S. Senate election ===
Curran won the 2020 Republican primary for an Illinois seat in the U.S. Senate. His vote in the March 17, 2020, primary election was 41% of the votes cast, against four other candidates. The general election was held in November 2020, with Curran standing unsuccessfully against incumbent Dick Durbin and fellow challenger Willie Wilson.

=== 2022 Illinois Supreme Court election ===
Curran ran for the 2nd district of the Illinois Supreme Court, which was redrawn in 2021 to encompass Kane County, Lake County, McHenry County, DeKalb County, and Kendall County counties. He lost the election 55–45 to Democrat Elizabeth Rochford.

Party political offices
| Preceded by Jim Oberweis | Republican nominee for U.S. senator from Illinois (Class 2); 2020 | Succeeded by Don Tracy |
