= 2020 Illinois judicial elections =

- November 3, 2020

The 2020 Illinois judicial elections consisted of both partisan and retention elections, including those for three seats on the Supreme Court of Illinois and 10 seats in the Illinois Appellate Court. Primary elections were held on March 17, 2020, and the general election was held on November 3, 2020. These elections were part of the 2020 Illinois elections.

== Supreme Court of Illinois ==
Justices of the Supreme Court of Illinois are elected by district. Two seats will be holding partisan elections, while another will be holding a retention election. On the Supreme Court of Illinois, seats occupied by previously elected justices will see retention elections, while races with justices not previously elected (whether the seat is vacant or filled by an appointee) will see competitive partisan elections.

The court has seven seats total separated into five districts. The first district, representing Cook County, contains three seats, making it a multi-member district, while other four districts are single-member districts. Justices hold ten year terms.

=== 1st district ===
One of the three seats from the 1st district is up for a partisan election. Incumbent P. Scott Neville Jr. was appointed to the Supreme Court in 2018 to fill the vacancy left by the retirement of Charles E. Freeman. This is a regularly scheduled election (Freeman's term would have ended in December 2020).

==== Democratic primary ====
Supreme Court of Illinois 1st district Democratic primary
| Party | Candidate | Votes | % |
|---|---|---|---|
| Democratic | P. Scott Neville Jr. (incumbent) | 214,066 | 26.25 |
| Democratic | Jesse G. Reyes | 165,344 | 20.27 |
| Democratic | Shelly A. Harris | 123,166 | 15.10 |
| Democratic | Cynthia Y. Cobbs | 103,497 | 12.69 |
| Democratic | Margaret Stanton McBride | 101,475 | 12.44 |
| Democratic | Daniel Epstein | 66,762 | 8.19 |
| Democratic | Nathaniel R. Howse | 41,205 | 5.05 |
| Total votes | | 815,515 | |

==== Republican primary ====
No candidates were included on the ballot in the Republican primary. While an official write-in candidate did run, he did not receive a sufficient number of votes to win nomination.

Results

Supreme Court of Illinois 1st district Republican primary
| Party | Candidate | Votes | % |
|---|---|---|---|
| Write-in | Richard Mayers | 22 | 100 |
| Total votes | | 22 | 100 |

==== General election ====
Supreme Court of Illinois 1st district election
| Party | Candidate | Votes | % |
|---|---|---|---|
| Democratic | P. Scott Neville Jr. (incumbent) | 1,765,329 | 100 |
| Write-in | Richard Mayers | 31 | 0.00 |
| Total votes | | 1,765,360 | 100 |

=== 5th district ===
Lloyd Karmeier, a Republican, retired on December 6, 2019, leaving the seat vacant until the election. This is a regularly scheduled election (Karmeier's term would have ended in December 2020). Three members of the Illinois Appellate Court from the 5th district chose to run; John B. Barberis Jr, Judy Cates, and David K. Overstreet.

==== Democratic primary ====
Supreme Court of Illinois 5th district Democratic primary
| Party | Candidate | Votes | % |
|---|---|---|---|
| Democratic | Judy Cates | 85,117 | 100 |
| Total votes | | 85,117 | 100 |

==== Republican primary ====
Supreme Court of Illinois 5th district Republican primary
| Party | Candidate | Votes | % |
|---|---|---|---|
| Republican | David K. Overstreet | 77,438 | 76.51 |
| Republican | John B. Barberis Jr. | 23,777 | 23.49 |
| Total votes | | 101,215 | |

==== General election ====
Supreme Court of Illinois 5th district election
| Party | Candidate | Votes | % |
|---|---|---|---|
| Republican | David K. Overstreet | 388,129 | 62.52 |
| Democratic | Judy Cates | 232,722 | 37.48 |
| Total votes | | 620,851 | 100 |

=== Retention elections ===
The 3rd district seat was held by Thomas L. Kilbride, a Democrat first elected to the Supreme Court in 2000.

In the 2nd district, Robert R. Thomas, a Republican, was scheduled to have retention election. However, he retired February 29, 2020. On March 1, 2020, Michael J. Burke assumed his seat, and will hold it until a special election in 2022.

To be retained, judges are required to have 60% of their vote be "yes". Kilbride did not reach that mark and only receiving approximately 57% of the vote. He is the first justice of the Illinois Supreme Court to lose retention vote in the history of the state.

| District | Incumbent | | | | Vote | |
| District | Party | Name | In office since | Previous years elected/retained | Yes (Retain) | No (Remove) |
|---|---|---|---|---|---|---|
| 3rd | Democratic | Thomas L. Kilbride | December 4, 2000 | 2000 (elected), 2010 (retained) | 452,142 (56.52%) | 347,812 (43.48%) |

== Illinois Appellate Court ==
Illinois Appellate Court justices hold ten-year terms.

=== 1st district (1st division) ===
Incumbent John C. Griffin was appointed in May 2018 following the retirement of John B. Simon. This is a special election for a four-year term, as Simon's term would not have ended until 2024. Griffin ran for reelection, but was unseated in the Democratic primary by Sharon Oden-Johnson.

==== Democratic primary ====
Illinois Appellate Court 1st district (1st division) Democratic primary
| Party | Candidate | Votes | % |
|---|---|---|---|
| Democratic | Sharon Oden-Johnson | 395,022 | 52.44 |
| Democratic | John C. Griffin (incumbent) | 358,226 | 47.56 |
| Total votes | | 753,248 | 100 |

==== Republican primary ====
The Republican primary was cancelled. No candidates had filed.

==== General election ====
Illinois Appellate Court 1st district (1st division) election
| Party | Candidate | Votes | % |
|---|---|---|---|
| Democratic | Sharon O. Johnson | 1,603,179 | 100 |
| Total votes | | 1,603,179 | 100 |

=== 1st district (3rd division) ===
Incumbent Michael Hyman was appointed in 2018 to fill the vacancy left when P. Scott Neville Jr. resigned this seat to assume a seat on the Supreme Court of Illinois. He was elected outright.

==== Democratic primary ====
Illinois Appellate Court 1st district (3rd division) Democratic primary
| Party | Candidate | Votes | % |
|---|---|---|---|
| Democratic | Michael B. Hyman (incumbent) | 273,898 | 35.51 |
| Democratic | Sandra Gisela Ramos | 207,989 | 26.96 |
| Democratic | Maureen Patricia O'Leary | 159,423 | 20.67 |
| Democratic | Carolyn Gallagher | 130,067 | 16.86 |
| Total votes | | 771,377 | 100 |

==== Republican primary ====
No candidates were included on the ballot in the Republican primary. While an official write-in candidate did run, he did not receive a sufficient number of votes to win nomination.

Results

Illinois Appellate Court 1st district (3rd division) Republican primary
| Party | Candidate | Votes | % |
|---|---|---|---|
| Write-in | Richard Mayers | 21 | 100 |
| Total votes | | 21 | 100 |

==== General election ====
Illinois Appellate Court 1st district (3rd division) election
| Party | Candidate | Votes | % |
|---|---|---|---|
| Democratic | Michael Hyman (incumbent) | 1,633,319 | 100 |
| Total votes | | 1,633,319 | 100 |

=== 5th district ===
Incumbent Mark M. Boie was appointed on May 1, 2019.

==== Democratic primary ====
Illinois Appellate Court 5th district Democratic primary
| Party | Candidate | Votes | % |
|---|---|---|---|
| Democratic | Sarah Smith | 84,509 | 100 |
| Total votes | | 84,509 | 100 |

==== Republican primary ====
Illinois Appellate Court 5th district Republican primary
| Party | Candidate | Votes | % |
|---|---|---|---|
| Republican | Mark M. Boie (incumbent) | 52,619 | 54.4 |
| Republican | Katherine Ruocco | 44,011 | 45.55 |
| Total votes | | 96,630 | |

==== General election ====
Illinois Appellate Court 5th district election
| Party | Candidate | Votes | % |
|---|---|---|---|
| Republican | Mark M. Boie (incumbent) | 367,036 | 59.86% |
| Democratic | Sarah Smith | 246,166 | 40.14% |
| Total votes | | 613,202 | 100% |
| Republican hold | | | |

=== Retention elections ===
To be retained, judges are required to have 60% of their vote be "yes".

| District | Incumbent | | | | Vote | | Cite |
| District | Party | Name | In office since | Previous years elected/retained | Yes (Retain) | No (Remove) | Cite |
|---|---|---|---|---|---|---|---|
| 1st | Democratic | Aurelia Marie Pucinski | December 6, 2010 | 2010 (elected) | 1,406,831 (77.37%) | 411,550 (22.63%) | |
| 1st | Democratic | Mary Katherine Rochford | December 6, 2010 | 2010 (elected) | 1,276,378 (75.40)% | 416,477 (24.60)% | |
| 2nd | Republican | Ann B. Jorgensen | July 2008 | 2010 (elected) | 1,090,351 (80.97%) | 256,183 (19.03%) | |
| 2nd | Republican | Mary S. Schostok | August 2008 | 2010 (elected) | 1,061,303 (80.01%) | 265,164 (19.99%) | |
| 3rd | Democratic | Mary McDade | December 4, 2000 | 2000 (elected), 2010 (retained) | 580,382 (76.10%) | 182,318 (23.90%) | |
| 5th | Republican | Thomas M. Welch | December 1, 1980 | 1980 (elected), 1990, 2000, 2010 (retained) | 416,928 (75.37%) | 136,244 (24.63%) | |

== Lower courts ==
Lower courts also saw judicial elections.
