= Paul E. Rink =

American judge and politician

Member of the Illinois House of Representatives

Personal details
- Party: Democratic

Paul E. Rink (December 12, 1916 – June 15, 2000) was an American judge and politician.

Paul E. Rink was born on a farm near Prophetstown, Illinois. He graduated from Erie High School in Erie, Illinois, and received his bachelor's degree from St. Ambrose University in 1938. In 1941 he received his law degree from DePaul University, was admitted to the Illinois bar, and began practicing law in Rock Island, Illinois. Rink served in the Illinois House of Representatives from 1957 to 1969, and then as an Illinois Circuit Court Judge from 1969 to 1981. Judge Rink was an active member of the Democratic Party. Paul E. Rink died at his home in Rock Island, Illinois. He is the father-in-law of Supreme Court of Illinois Justice Robert L. Carter (Illinois judge) and Father of former Indian Hill, Ohio Mayor Thomas Rink.
