= Dan Brady (Illinois politician) =

American politician (born 1961)

Mayor of Bloomington, Illinois
- Incumbent
- Assumed office May 1, 2025
- Preceded by: Mboka Mwilambwe

Member of the Illinois House of Representatives from the 105th district
- In office January 9th, 2013 – January 9th, 2023
- Preceded by: Jason Barickman
- Succeeded by: Dennis Tipsword

Member of the Illinois House of Representatives from the 88th district
- In office January 11, 2001 – January 11, 2013
- Preceded by: Bill Brady
- Succeeded by: Keith Sommer

Personal details
- Born: July 4, 1961 (age 65) Bloomington, Illinois, U.S.
- Party: Republican
- Spouse: Teri Brady
- Children: 2
- Education: Southern Illinois University, Carbondale; St. Ambrose University (BA)

Dan Brady (born July 4, 1961) is an American politician serving as the mayor of Bloomington, Illinois. He is a former Republican member of the Illinois House of Representatives from 2001 to 2023, representing the 105th and 88th Districts. Brady also served as the McLean County Coroner from 1992 to 2000.

In 2022, Dan Brady was the Republican candidate for Illinois Secretary of State. Brady's campaign suffered from a 10-1 fundraising disadvantage and a lack of influential endorsements. Brady was defeated by Democratic candidate Alexi Giannoulias, receiving 43.6% of the vote.

In 2024, Brady announced his candidacy for Mayor of Bloomington, becoming the first to challenge incumbent Mayor Mboka Mwilambwe in the 2025 municipal election. Brady's campaign focused primarily on public safety, water improvements, and his prior leadership in the General Assembly. Brady was elected with 47.7% of votes cast, soundly defeating teacher and Bloomington city council member Cody Hendricks (33.4%) and Mwilambwe (19.9%).

== Early career ==
Brady was born in Bloomington on July 4, 1961. He attended Southern Illinois University Carbondale for his Associates Degree and St. Ambrose University for his Bachelors. He is a funeral home operator by profession. In 1992, Brady was elected McLean County Coroner, a position he was later elected to again in 1996.

== Illinois House of Representatives ==
In 2000, Bill Brady vacated his State House seat to run for Congress in Illinois's 15th congressional district. Dan Brady defeated Bill Brady's brother Ed Brady in the Republican primary for the 88th district. Brady defeated Democratic candidate John Owen in the general election.

As part of the 2011 decennial reapportionment process, Brady was drawn into the 105th district which he represented from 2013 to 2023.

Brady served as Deputy Minority Leader, a position he held from 2017 to 2023. While in the House, Brady cosponsored several pieces of legislation such as IL HB0642, which establishes term limits for all leadership positions in the general assembly.

Representative Brady was a member of the following Illinois House committees:

- Appropriations - Higher Education Committee (HAPI)
- Executive Committee (HEXC)
- Higher Education Committee (HHED)
- Insurance Committee (HINS)
- Insurance Review Subcommittee (HINS-INSU)
- Rules Committee (HRUL)
- Special Issues (INS) Subcommittee (HINS-SPIS)

== Candidate for Secretary of State ==
Brady announced his candidacy to succeed retiring incumbent Jesse White for Secretary of State in the 2022 Illinois Secretary of State election. He became the first Republican candidate to have announced his run. His campaign platform focused on decreasing wait times at motor facilities as well as increasing organ donation registration.

== Mayor of Bloomington ==
Brady was elected mayor of Bloomington in 2025.

== Personal life ==
Brady lives in Bloomington, Illinois, with his wife, Teri, and their two children. Brady is a Catholic.

== Electoral history ==
=== 2000 ===
Illinois 88th Assembly district election, 2000 general election
Party	Candidate	Votes	%
Republican	Dan Brady	30,231	71.2
Democratic	John A. Owen	12,227	28.8
Total votes		42,458	100.0

=== 2002 ===
Illinois 88th Assembly district election, 2002 general election
Party	Candidate	Votes	%
Republican	Dan Brady	23,247	100
Total votes		23,247	100.0

=== 2004 ===
Illinois 88th Assembly district election, 2004 general election
Party	Candidate	Votes	%
Republican	Dan Brady	36,114	83.93
Green	Phil Huckleberry	6,914	16.07
Total votes		43,028	100.0

=== 2006 ===
Illinois 88th Assembly district election, 2006 general election
Party	Candidate	Votes	%
Republican	Dan Brady	21,994	80.64
Green	Phil Huckleberry	5,279	19.36
Total votes		27,273	100.0

=== 2008 ===
Illinois 88th Assembly district election, 2008 general election
Party	Candidate	Votes	%
Republican	Dan Brady	42,592	100
Total votes		42,592	100.0

=== 2010 ===
Illinois 88th Assembly district election, 2010 general election
Party	Candidate	Votes	%
Republican	Dan Brady	29,244	100
Total votes		29,244	100.0

=== 2012 ===
Illinois 105th Assembly district election, 2012 general election
Party	Candidate	Votes	%
Republican	Dan Brady	39,833	100
Total votes		39,833	100.0

=== 2014 ===
Illinois 105th Assembly district election, 2014 general election
Party	Candidate	Votes	%
Republican	Dan Brady	28,373	100
Total votes		28,373	100.0

=== 2016 ===
Illinois 105th Assembly district election, 2016 general election
Party	Candidate	Votes	%
Republican	Dan Brady	43,961	100
Total votes		43,961	100.0

=== 2018 ===
Illinois 105th Assembly district election, 2018 Republican primary election
Party	Candidate	Votes	%
Republican	Dan Brady	7,699	74.07
Republican	David Paul Blumenshine	2,695	25.93
Total votes		10,394	100.0

Illinois 105th Assembly district election, 2018 general election
Party	Candidate	Votes	%
Republican	Dan Brady	26,486	60.42
Democratic	Benjamin Webb	17,349	39.58
Total votes		43,835	100.0

=== 2022 ===
2022 Illinois Secretary of State election
Party	Candidate	Votes	%
Democratic	Alexi Giannoulias	2,220,713	54.28
Republican	Dan Brady	1,783,070	43.59
Libertarian	Jon Stewart	87,092	2.13
Write-in		73	0.0
Total votes		4,090,948	100.0

=== 2025 ===
2025 Bloomington Mayoral Race
Party	Candidate	Votes	%
Nonpartisan	Dan Brady	8,056	47.73
Nonpartisan	Cody Hendricks	5,641	33.42
Nonpartisan	Mboka Mwilambwe (Incumbent)	3,181	18.85
Total votes		16,878	100.0

Party political offices
Preceded by Jason Helland	Republican nominee for Secretary of State of Illinois; 2022	Succeeded by Diane Harris
