= Ray A. Christensen =

American politician (1922–2008)

Ray A. Christensen (May 11, 1922 — April 21, 2008) was an American politician who served as a Democratic member of the Illinois House of Representatives from 1977 to 1989.

Christensen was born in Dwight, Illinois on May 11, 1922, and raised in Morris, Illinois. He served in the United States Army Air Forces during World War II.

A meat inspector and butcher by occupation, Christensen served on the Morris City Council and as President of the Morris Community High School District 101 Board of Education.

In the 1976 general election, Christensen as one of three representatives from the 43rd district. The 43rd district included all or parts of Grundy, Will, Kankakee, Iroquois, Ford, and Champaign counties. Elected alongside him were two Republican candidates; incumbent George Ryan and former State Senator Edward McBroom. The fourth candidate was Kankakee County Treasurer Charles Pangle. During his early House tenure, he was a supporter of the Equal Rights Amendment.

After the Cutback Amendment eliminated multi-member districts and cumulative voting, Christensen was elected from the 85th district, which included all or parts of Grundy, Will, Kankakee, and LaSalle counties.

In the 1986 general election, Jerry Weller challenged Christensen and in the official result, Weller won by a four-vote margin, 14,217 to 14,213. Christensen challenged the result while Weller was sworn in as the State Representative. The Illinois House of Representatives set up a House Committee on Election Contests which heard the two candidates challenges. In a party line vote, the House voted to unseat Weller and seat Christensen. Christensen opted to retire. Jerry Weller defeated Democratic candidate and Grundy County Clerk Lana Phillips to succeed Christensen.

Christensen died April 21, 2008.
