= Elizabeth Rochford =

American judge (born 1960 or 1961)

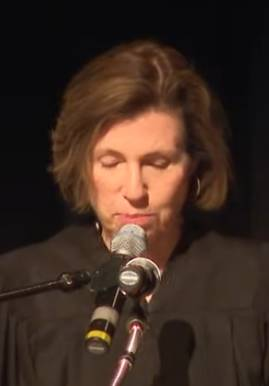
- Rochford in 2023

Justice of the Illinois Supreme Court
- Incumbent
- Assumed office December 5, 2022
- Preceded by: Michael J. Burke

Personal details
- Born: 1960 or 1961 (age 64–65)
- Party: Democratic
- Education: Loyola University Chicago (BA, JD)

Elizabeth M. Rochford (born 1960 or 1961) is an American lawyer from Illinois who has served as a justice of the Illinois Supreme Court since 2022.

== Education ==
Rochford earned a Bachelor of Arts in English from Loyola University of Chicago and a Juris Doctor from the Loyola University Chicago School of Law.

== Career ==
From 1984 to 1986, Rochford was a law clerk with Corboy & Demetrio. From 1986 to 1990, she was Cook County assistant state's attorney, from 1990 to 2012, she was a court of claims commissioner for the state of Illinois, concurrently from 2004 to 2012, she was a hearing officer with Skokie, Morton Grove, Lincolnwood, and Glenview. Additionally, from 1990 to 2012, she was in private practice where she focused on estate planning, probate, trusts and trust administration, real estate, administrative law. On December 27, 2012, she was appointed as an associate judge of the 19th Judicial Circuit. Her service on the circuit court terminated when she was sworn in as a justice of the Illinois Supreme Court.

=== Illinois Supreme Court ===
In the general election held on November 8, 2022, Rochford faced off against Republican Lake County Sheriff Mark Curran. She went on to win against her opponent, securing 54% of the vote, cementing a Democratic majority on the court. She was sworn in on December 5, 2022.

== Personal life ==
Rochford is married to Mike Striedl and they have two adult daughters.

Legal offices
Preceded by Michael J. Burke	Justice of the Illinois Supreme Court; 2022–present	Incumbent
