= Thomas L. Kilbride =

American jurist (born 1953)

Tom Kilbride

Chief Justice of the Supreme Court of Illinois
- In office October 2010 – October 2013
- Preceded by: Thomas R. Fitzgerald
- Succeeded by: Rita B. Garman

Justice of the Supreme Court of Illinois for the Third District
- In office December 1, 2000 – December 7, 2020
- Preceded by: James D. Heiple
- Succeeded by: Robert L. Carter

Personal details
- Born: August 5, 1953 (age 71); LaSalle, Illinois
- Political party: Democratic
- Spouse: Mary
- Children: 3
- Education: St. Mary's College (BA); Antioch School of Law (JD)

Thomas L. Kilbride (born August 5, 1953) is an American jurist who served on the Supreme Court of Illinois from 2000 to 2020. Kilbride served as Chief Justice of the court from October 2010 through October 25, 2013. He was elected to the Illinois Supreme Court Justice for the Third District in 2000 and elected Chief Justice by his colleagues in October 2010 for a three-year term. After losing a retention election in 2020, his tenure on the court ended in December 2020.

== Early life and education ==
Kilbride was born in LaSalle, Illinois. He received a Bachelor of Arts degree magna cum laude from St. Mary's College in Winona, Minnesota in 1978 and received his J.D. degree from Antioch School of Law in Washington, DC, in 1981.

== Career ==
Kilbride practiced law for 20 years in Rock Island, Illinois, engaging in the general practice of law, including environmental law, labor law, employment matters, appeals, and other general civil and criminal matters. He was admitted to practice in the United States District Court of Central Illinois and the United States Seventh Circuit Court of Appeals.

He was elected to the Supreme Court of Illinois for the Third District in 2000 defeating state legislator Carl Hawkinson of Galesburg to succeed Republican James Heiple after Heiple decided not to seek retention. The Third District comprises Bureau, Fulton, Grundy, Hancock, Henderson, Henry, Iroquois, Kankakee, Knox, LaSalle, Marshall, McDonough, Mercer, Peoria, Putnam, Rock Island, Stark, Tazewell, Warren, Whiteside, and Will counties in northern and central Illinois. He was sworn in on December 1, 2000.

Justice Kilbride is a past board member, past president and past vice-president of the Illinois Township Attorneys Association, a past volunteer lawyer and charter member of the Illinois Pro Bono Center, and a member of the Illinois State Bar and Rock Island County Bar Associations. He has served as volunteer legal advisor for the Community Caring Conference, the charter chairman of the Quad Cities Interfaith Sponsoring committee, volunteer legal advisor to Quad City Harvest, Inc., and a past member of the Rock Island Human Relations Commission.

As of October 2012, he is continuing to promote a 2012 movement (that he and others spearheaded) to place cameras in the Illinois state circuit courts; 23 out of 102 Illinois counties are participating to some extent. He also spearheaded a pilot program to promote electronically filing legal documents to the court, a cost and time saving process.

Kilbride ran for retention as a justice of the Illinois Supreme Court in the 2020 election. In the 2020 general election, Kilbride received approximately 56% of the vote in favor of his retention, which is less than the supermajority of 60% required by state law to be retained. Kilbride's failure in his retention election was the first time that an Illinois Supreme Court justice lost a retention election. After Kilbride lost retention, the Illinois Supreme Court appointed Appellate Judge Robert L. Carter as a placeholder until the 2022 general election. Kilbride's term ended on December 7, 2020.

Legal offices
Preceded by James D. Heiple	Associate Justice of the Supreme Court of Illinois; 2000–2020	Succeeded by Robert L. Carter
