= Michael J. Burke =

American judge; Justice of the Illinois Supreme Court

Michael Burke

Justice of the Illinois Supreme Court
- In office March 1, 2020 – December 5, 2022
- Preceded by: Robert R. Thomas
- Succeeded by: Elizabeth Rochford

Judge of the Illinois 2nd District Appellate Court
- In office July 2008 – March 2020

Judge of the Illinois 18th Circuit Court
- In office 2001–2008

Associate Judge of the Illinois 18th Circuit Court
- In office 1992–2001

Personal details
- Born: October 28, 1958 (age 68) Chicago, Illinois, U.S.
- Party: Republican
- Education: Northern Illinois University (BS); John Marshall Law School, Chicago (JD)

Michael J. Burke (born October 28, 1958) is an American lawyer who served as a justice of the Supreme Court of Illinois from 2020 to 2022. He was previously a judge on the Illinois Second District Appellate Court.

== Early life and education ==
Burke was born in Chicago on October 28, 1958. He received a Bachelor of Science magna cum laude in 1980 from Northern Illinois University and a Juris Doctor with highest distinction from UIC John Marshall Law School in 1984.

== Legal career ==
Burke began his career in the DuPage County State's Attorney's Office in 1983, becoming Chief of the Special Prosecutions Unit in 1991.

== Judicial career ==
He served as an associate judge of the 18th Judicial Circuit from 1992 to 2001 and as a Circuit Judge from 2001 to 2008. While serving on the Circuit Court, he was the Presiding Judge of the Misdemeanor/Traffic Division. In July 2008, he was assigned to the Appellate Court. After the 2012 death of Judge John J. Bowman, Burke was elected in the special election to fill his seat on the Illinois 2nd appellate court district, being elected to permanently serve on the appellate court through the 2020 end of Browman's unexpired term.

On February 10, 2020, the Supreme Court of Illinois appointed Burke to fill the vacancy left by Robert R. Thomas who retired effective on February 29, 2020. Burke served until December 5, 2022.

With his residence redistricted to the Illinois Supreme Court's 3rd district from the 2nd district (which was the seat he had been appointed to), Burke is running for election in 2022 to the 3rd district seat.

== Personal life ==
Burke and his wife Mary Ann have four children. They live in Elmhurst, Illinois.

Legal offices
Preceded by Robert R. Thomas	Justice of the Illinois Supreme Court; 2020–2022	Succeeded by Elizabeth Rochford
