= Mary Kay O'Brien =

American judge (born 1965)

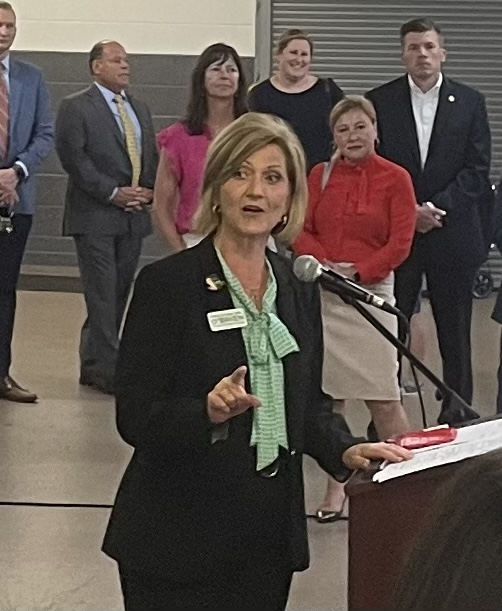
- O'Brien in 2022

Justice of the Illinois Supreme Court
- Incumbent
- Assumed office December 5, 2022
- Preceded by: Robert Carter

Judge of the Illinois Appellate Court for the 3rd district
- In office December 26, 2003 – December 5, 2022
- Preceded by: Thomas J. Homer
- Succeeded by: Linda Davenport

Member of the Illinois House of Representatives from the 75th district
- In office January 1997 – December 17, 2003
- Preceded by: Stephen Spangler
- Succeeded by: Careen M. Gordon

Personal details
- Born: June 4, 1965 (age 61) Kankakee, Illinois, U.S.
- Party: Democratic
- Education: Joliet Junior College (attended); Western Illinois University (BA); University of Illinois, Urbana-Champaign (JD)

Mary Kay O'Brien (born June 4, 1965) is an American judge and politician who serves as a justice of the Illinois Supreme Court since 2022.

== Early life and education ==
Born was born on June 4, 1965, in Kankakee, Illinois, O'Brien grew up on a farm in Reddick, Illinois. She graduated from Reddick High School and went to Joliet Junior College. O'Brien received her bachelor's degree from Western Illinois University in 1986 and her J.D. degree from the University of Illinois College of Law in 1994.

== Career ==
=== Early Legal Practice ===
O'Brien began her legal career working at the Grundy County State's Attorney's Office before starting her own law firm in Coal City, Illinois.

=== Illinois House of Representatives ===
In 1996, she defeated Republican incumbent Stephen Spangler to represent the 75th district. The 75th district, at the time, included all of Grundy County and parts of LaSalle, Kankakee, and Will counties. From 1997 to 2003, O'Brien served in the Illinois House of Representatives and was a Democrat. The 2001 decennial reapportionment, added portions of Iroquois and Livingston counties. O'Brien resigned from the Illinois House of Representatives on December 17, 2003.

=== Judicial service ===
O'Brien was appointed a judge of the Third District of the Illinois Appellate Court to fill the vacancy created by the retirement of Thomas J. Homer. She was sworn in on December 26, 2003.

O'Brien was elected to the court in 2004 and retained in 2014.

O'Brien was elected to the third district seat on the Illinois Supreme Court in 2022. She was sworn into office on December 5, 2022. The Illinois Supreme Court appointed Linda Davenport to the vacancy created by O'Brien's election.

== Notes ==
Legal offices
Preceded by Robert Carter	Justice of the Illinois Supreme Court; 2022–present	Incumbent
