= 2020 United States Senate election in Illinois =

- November 3, 2020
- Turnout: 72.92%
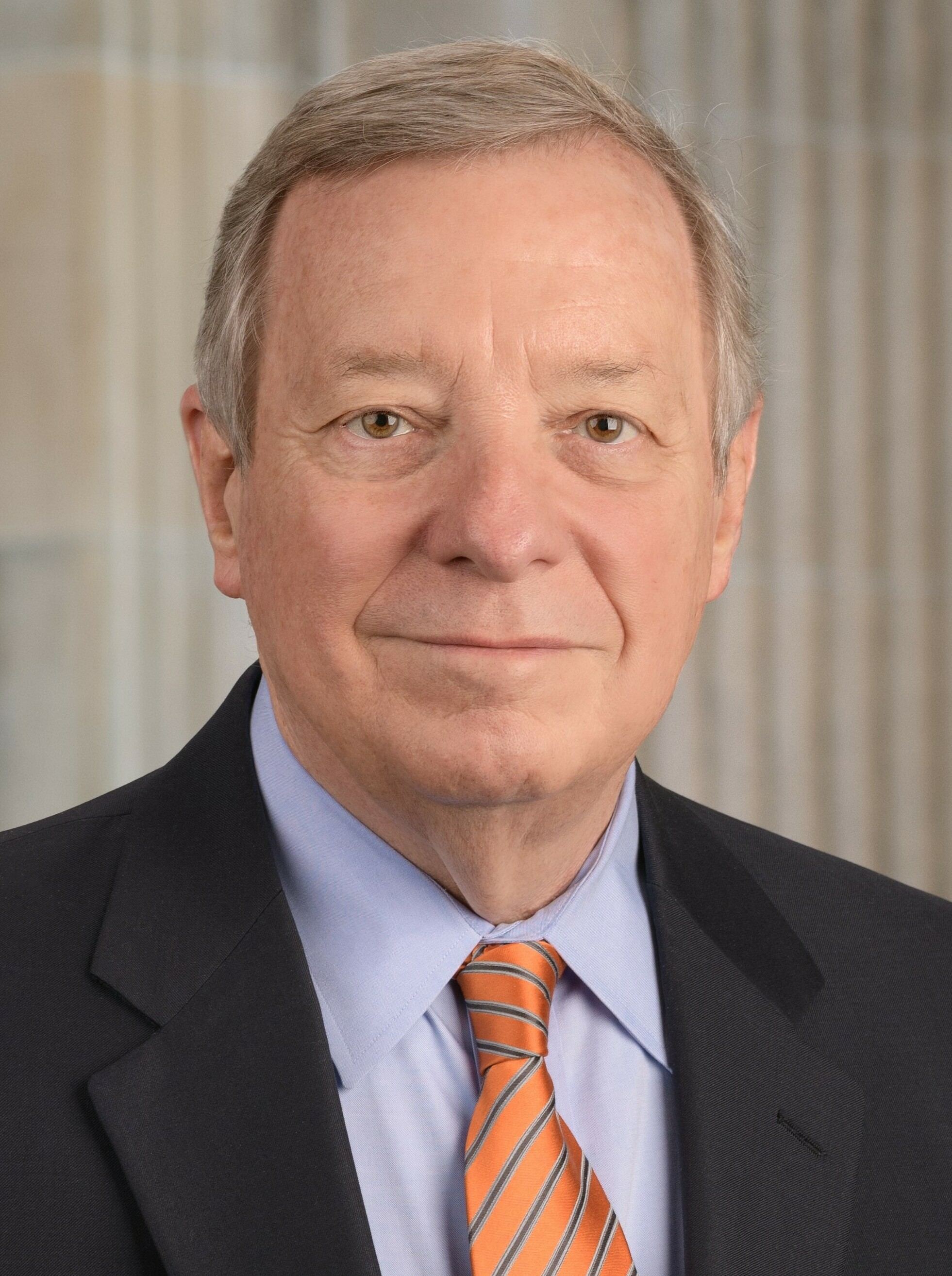

Nominee	Dick Durbin	Mark Curran
Party	Democratic	Republican
Popular vote	3,278,930	2,319,870
Percentage	54.93%	38.87%
- Durbin: 40–50% 50–60% 60–70% 70–80% 80–90% >90% Curran: 40–50% 50–60% 60–70% 70–80% 80–90% >90% Tie: 40–50% No data
U.S. senator before election
Dick Durbin
Democratic
Elected U.S. Senator
Dick Durbin
Democratic

The 2020 United States Senate election in Illinois was held on November 3, 2020, to elect a member of the United States Senate to represent the State of Illinois, concurrently with the 2020 U.S. presidential election, as well as other elections to the United States Senate, elections to the United States House of Representatives, various state and local elections, and the Illinois Fair Tax. Incumbent Democratic Senator Dick Durbin, who had been Senate Minority Whip since 2015, won election to a fifth and final term in office, defeating Republican nominee Mark Curran.

Durbin won with 54.9% of the vote. Key to Durbin's landslide victory was the heavily populated and very Democratic Cook County, home of Chicago, which he won by around 560,000 votes. Durbin also did well in the suburban counties, often called "collar counties", of Chicago, winning all of them except McHenry County. Durbin did well in Champaign County, home of the University of Illinois, and St. Clair County, where his birth home of East St. Louis is located. Nevertheless, Curran did well in most rural areas of the state, including winning rural Alexander County, where a Republican had not won since 1972. Durbin became the first senator from Illinois to be elected five consecutive times since senators began being elected by popular vote in 1913.

== Background ==
The primaries and general elections coincide with those for federal (president and House) and those for state offices.

For the primaries, turnout was 28.36%, with 2,279,439 votes cast.

== Democratic primary ==
=== Candidates ===
==== Nominee ====
- Dick Durbin, incumbent U.S. senator and Senate Minority Whip

==== Withdrawn ====
- Marilyn Jordan Lawlor, anti-war activist
- Anne Stava-Murray, state representative

==== Declined ====
- Cheri Bustos, incumbent U.S. representative for Illinois's 17th congressional district (running for re-election)
- Lisa Madigan, former Illinois attorney general

=== Endorsements ===
Dick Durbin

Organizations

- Brady Campaign
- Chicago Federation of Labor
- End Citizens United
- Illinois AFL–CIO
- J Street
- National Organization for Women
- Planned Parenthood Action Fund
- Planned Parenthood Illinois Action
- Sierra Club

=== Results ===
Democratic primary results
Party	Candidate	Votes	%
Democratic	Dick Durbin (incumbent)	1,446,118	100.00%
Total votes		1,446,118	100.00%

== Republican primary ==
=== Candidates ===
==== Nominee ====
- Mark Curran, former Lake County sheriff and candidate for attorney general in 2014

==== Eliminated in primary ====
- Casey Chlebek, businessman
- Peggy Hubbard, U.S. Navy veteran and former police officer
- Robert Marshall, physician and perennial candidate, Democratic primary candidate for governor of Illinois in 2018
- Richard Mayers (as a write-in candidate), perennial candidate and alleged white supremacist;
- Tom Tarter, cancer surgeon

==== Withdrew ====
- Preston Nelson, Republican candidate for Illinois's 12th congressional district in 2018 (ran for IL-08 as a Libertarian)
- Dean Seppelfrick
- Connor Vlakancic, CEO of 5Star Inc. (switched to independent)

==== Declined ====
- Rodney Davis, incumbent U.S. representative for Illinois's 13th congressional district (running for re-election)
- Erika Harold, attorney, former Miss America, candidate for IL-13 in 2014, and nominee for attorney general in 2018
- Darin LaHood, incumbent U.S. representative for Illinois's 18th congressional district (running for re-election)

=== Endorsements ===
Mark Curran

U.S. representatives

- Bob Dold, former congressman (IL-10)
- Randy Hultgren, former congressman (IL-14)

U.S. lieutenant governors

- Evelyn Sanguinetti, former lt. governor of Illinois

U.S. attorneys general

- Jim Ryan, former attorney general of Illinois

Illinois legislators

- Mike Connelly, former state senator and state representative
- Dan McConchie, state senator
- Matt Murphy, former state senator
- Paul Schimpf, state senator
- W. Timothy Simms, former state senator and state representative
- Al Salvi, former state representative
- Darlene Senger, former state representative
- Tom Weber, state representative

Newspapers

- Chicago Sun-Times
- Chicago Tribune
- Daily Herald

Organizations

- Addison Township
- Cook County GOP
- Fremont Township GOP
- Illinois Family Action PAC
- Illinois Federation for Right to Life PAC
- Lake County GOP
- Libertyville Township GOP
- Lyons Township GOP
- National Right to Life Committee
- New Trier Republican Organization
- Niles Township Republican Organization
- Northfield Township GOP
- Northwest Side GOP Club
- Paul Caprio's Family-PAC
- Republican Women of Park Ridge
- Republicans of Maine Township
- United Hellenic Voters of America
- Warren Township GOP
- Wheeling Township GOP

Individuals

- David Clarke, former Milwaukee County sheriff

=== Results ===
Results by county Curran: Curran—60–70%; Curran—50–60%; Curran—40–50%; Curran—30–40%; Curran—<30%; Hubbard: Hubbard—40–50%; Hubbard—30–40%; Hubbard—<30; Tarter: Tarter—30–40%; Tarter—<30

Republican primary results
Party	Candidate	Votes	%
Republican	Mark Curran	205,747	41.55%
Republican	Peggy Hubbard	113,189	22.86%
Republican	Robert Marshall	75,561	15.26%
Republican	Tom Tarter	73,009	14.74%
Republican	Casey Chlebek	27,655	5.58%
Republican	Richard Mayers (write-in)	7	0.00%
Total votes		495,168	100.00%

== Other candidates ==
A legal ruling, taking note of the COVID-19 pandemic in Illinois, allowed the Libertarian and Green parties to have their selected candidate on the ballot without the normal signature requirements, as they each ran a candidate for U.S. Senate in 2016.

=== Constitution Party ===
==== Removed from ballot ====
- Chad Koppie, perennial candidate and former member of the Kane County Regional Board of School Trustees

=== Green Party ===
==== Nominee ====
- David F. Black, Green Party nominee for Illinois attorney general in 2010

=== Independent American Party ===
==== Withdrawn ====
- Keith Richardson

=== Libertarian Party ===
==== Nominee ====
- Danny Malouf, human resource director, former Republican candidate for the 2020 Illinois 14th congressional district election

=== Willie Wilson Party ===
==== Declared ====
- Willie Wilson, businessman and perennial candidate

=== Independents ===
==== Declared ====
- Kevin Keely, substitute teacher and community activist (as a write-in candidate)
- Albert A. Schaal (as a write-in candidate)
- Lowell Martin Seida, perennial candidate (as a write-in candidate)

==== Withdrawn ====
- Patrick Feges
- Julie Rushing
- Connor Vlakancic, affiliated with the Republican Party (switched from Republican candidacy)

== General election ==
=== Predictions ===
Source	Ranking	As of
The Cook Political Report	Safe D	October 29, 2020
Inside Elections	Safe D	October 28, 2020
Sabato's Crystal Ball	Safe D	November 2, 2020
Daily Kos	Safe D	October 30, 2020
Politico	Safe D	November 2, 2020
RCP	Safe D	October 23, 2020
DDHQ	Safe D	November 3, 2020
538	Safe D	November 2, 2020
Economist	Safe D	November 2, 2020

=== Additional general election endorsements ===
Dick Durbin (D)

U.S. presidents

- Barack Obama, 44th president of the United States (2009–2017)

Newspapers

- Chicago Sun-Times
- Daily Chronicle
- Daily Herald
- The Dispatch/The Dispatch–Argus
- The News-Gazette

Organizations

- Council for a Livable World
- Everytown for Gun Safety
- Giffords
- Human Rights Campaign
- Humane Society of the United States Legislative Fund
- Joint Action Committee for Political Affairs
- League of Conservation Voters
- National Committee to Preserve Social Security and Medicare
- National Education Association
- Natural Resources Defense Council Action Fund

Unions

- International Federation of Professional and Technical Engineers
- SEIU Healthcare: Indiana-Illinois-Missouri-Kansas
- United Auto Workers
Mark Curran (R)

Organizations

- Log Cabin Republicans
- Tazewell County Republican Party
Willie Wilson (WW)

Aldermen

- Anthony Napolitano, alderman for Chicago's 41st Ward
- Nicholas Sposato, alderman for Chicago's 38th Ward
- Chris Taliaferro, alderman for Chicago's 29th Ward

Organizations

- Chicago Police Union

=== Polling ===
Poll source	Date(s) administered	Sample size (Note: Key: A – all adults RV – registered voters LV – likely voters V – unclear)	Margin of error	Dick Durbin (D)	Mark Curran (R)	Willie Wilson (I)	Other	Undecided
Research Co.	October 31 – November 1, 2020	450 (LV)	± 4.6%	52%	30%	–	4% (Note: "Someone else" with 4%)	14%
Victory Research	October 26 – November 1, 2020	1,208 (LV)	± 2.8%	51%	26%	15%	5% (Note: Malouf (L) with 3%; Black (G) with 2%)	4%

Hypothetical polling

with Dick Durbin, generic Republican and Willie Wilson

Poll source	Date(s) administered	Sample size	Margin of error	Dick Durbin (D)	Generic Republican (R)	Willie Wilson (I)	Undecided
Ogden & Fry/Citizens for Willie Wilson (Note: Poll sponsored by Willie Wilson's campaign)	September 4, 2019	449 (LV)	± 4.31%	44%	34%	4%	18%

with Dick Durbin and Willie Wilson

Poll source	Date(s) administered	Sample size	Margin of error	Dick Durbin (D)	Willie Wilson (I)	Undecided
Ogden & Fry/Citizens for Willie Wilson	September 4, 2019	420 (LV)	± 4.31%	44%	25%	31%

=== Results ===
Durbin also kept his landslide winning streak by winning with at least a ten-point margin. Durbin was sworn in on January 3, 2021, for his fifth term, which expires on January 3, 2027.

United States Senate election in Illinois, 2020
Party	Candidate	Votes	%	±%
Democratic	Dick Durbin (incumbent)	3,278,930	54.93%	+1.38%
Republican	Mark Curran	2,319,870	38.87%	−3.82%
Willie Wilson Party	Willie Wilson	237,699	3.98%	N/A
Libertarian	Danny Malouf	75,673	1.27%	−2.49%
Green	David Black	56,711	0.95%	N/A
Write-in		18	0.00%	N/A
Total votes		5,968,901	100.0%	
Democratic hold				

==== By county ====
County	Dick Durbin Democratic		Mark Curran Republican		Various candidates Other parties		Margin		Total votes cast
County	#	%	#	%	#	%	#	%	Total votes cast
Adams	8,835	26.6%	23,625	71.0%	804	2.4%	−14,790	−44.4%	33,264
Alexander	1,218	47.8%	1,284	50.4%	48	1.9%	−66	−2.6%	2,550
Bond	2,714	33.7%	5,061	62.8%	279	3.5%	−2,347	−29.1%	8,054
Boone	10,090	40.9%	13,579	55.1%	993	4.0%	−3,489	−14.2%	24,662
Brown	635	25.5%	1,787	71.9%	65	2.5%	−1,152	−46.4%	2,487
Bureau	7,079	41.1%	9,487	55.0%	675	3.9%	−2,408	−13.9%	17,241
Calhoun	930	34.5%	1,697	63.0%	65	2.4%	−767	−28.5%	2,692
Carroll	2,835	35.8%	4,840	61.2%	239	3.0%	−2,005	−25.4%	7,914
Cass	1,862	35.6%	3,260	62.3%	109	2.1%	−1,398	−26.7%	5,231
Champaign	55,220	58.3%	35,276	37.2%	4,275	4.5%	19,944	21.1%	94,771
Christian	4,874	30.5%	10,515	65.8%	583	3.7%	−5,641	−35.3%	15,972
Clark	2,082	25.2%	5,939	72.0%	226	2.7%	−3,857	−46.8%	8,248
Clay	1,295	19.3%	5,254	78.4%	153	2.4%	−3,959	−59.1%	6,702
Clinton	5,329	28.1%	13,162	69.3%	499	2.6%	−7,833	−41.2%	18,990
Coles	8,138	36.4%	13,379	59.9%	812	3.7%	−5,241	−26.33%	22,329
Cook	1,574,685	68.8%	499,034	21.8%	216,041	9.4%	1,075,651	47.0%	2,289,760
Crawford	2,384	25.6%	6,684	71.7%	249	2.6%	−4,300	−46.1%	9,317
Cumberland	1,357	23.5%	4,248	73.6%	169	2.9%	−2,891	−50.1%	5,774
DeKalb	23,423	49.3%	21,198	44.6%	2,855	6.0%	2,225	4.7%	47,476
DeWitt	2,451	31.0%	5,140	65.1%	309	4.0%	−2,689	−34.1%	7,900
Douglas	2,494	28.9%	5,864	68.0%	271	3.2%	−3,370	−39.1%	8,629
DuPage	264,921	54.8%	196,759	40.7%	22,091	4.6%	68,162	14.1%	483,771
Edgar	2,247	27.9%	5,568	69.1%	242	3.0%	−3,321	−41.2%	8,057
Edwards	556	17.0%	2,658	81.2%	58	1.8%	−2,102	−64.2%	3,272
Effingham	4,128	21.9%	14,272	75.9%	413	2.2%	−10,144	−44.0%	18,813
Fayette	2,113	21.3%	7,589	76.4%	228	2.4%	−5,476	−55.1%	9,930
Ford	1,765	25.7%	4,872	70.9%	239	3.5%	−3,107	−45.2%	6,876
Franklin	5,810	31.7%	12,118	66.1%	416	2.3%	−6,308	−34.4%	18,344
Fulton	7,109	43.2%	8,799	53.4%	559	3.3%	−1,690	−10.2%	16,497
Gallatin	829	32.7%	1,642	64.7%	68	2.6%	−813	−32.0%	2,539
Greene	1,702	28.1%	4,169	68.9%	182	3.0%	−2,467	−40.8%	6,053
Grundy	9,766	37.1%	15,005	57.1%	1,528	5.8%	−5,239	−20.0%	26,299
Hamilton	1,112	26.7%	2,931	70.5%	115	2.7%	−1,819	−43.8%	4,158
Hancock	2,516	27.3%	6,484	70.2%	232	2.5%	−3,968	−42.9%	9,232
Hardin	591	28.5%	1,431	69.0%	51	2.5%	−840	−40.5%	2,073
Henderson	1,299	36.4%	2,178	61.1%	89	2.5%	−879	−24.7%	3,566
Henry	10,004	39.6%	14,555	57.6%	717	2.8%	−4,551	−18.0%	25,276
Iroquois	3,075	22.2%	10,249	74.0%	532	3.9%	−7,174	−51.8%	13,856
Jackson	11,338	50.5%	10,291	45.9%	805	3.5%	1,047	4.6%	22,434
Jasper	1,180	21.7%	4,157	76.3%	111	2.0%	−2,977	−54.6%	5,448
Jefferson	5,099	30.0%	11,399	67.1%	485	2.9%	−6,300	−37.1%	16,983
Jersey	3,478	29.9%	7,850	67.4%	316	2.7%	−4,372	−37.5%	11,644
Jo Daviess	5,061	41.2%	6,856	55.9%	354	2.9%	−1,795	−14.7%	12,271
Johnson	1,559	24.6%	4,626	73.0%	148	2.4%	−3,067	−48.4%	6,333
Kane	122,627	53.3%	96,270	41.9%	11,115	4.8%	26,357	11.4%	230,012
Kankakee	19,754	40.0%	26,505	53.6%	3,181	6.4%	−6,751	−13.6%	49,440
Kendall	31,055	49.0%	28,790	45.4%	3,501	5.6%	2,265	3.6%	63,346
Knox	10,820	47.4%	11,349	49.7%	677	2.9%	−529	−2.3%	22,846
Lake	187,630	56.5%	131,344	39.5%	13,316	4.0%	56,286	17.0%	332,290
LaSalle	22,851	43.2%	27,437	51.9%	2,562	4.9%	−4,586	−8.7%	52,850
Lawrence	1,571	25.1%	4,500	72.0%	180	2.9%	−2,929	−46.9%	6,251
Lee	6,446	39.8%	9,188	56.7%	566	3.5%	−2,742	−16.9%	16,200
Livingston	4,969	29.3%	11,258	66.5%	706	4.2%	−6,289	−37.2%	16,933
Logan	4,366	33.2%	8,351	63.5%	428	3.2%	−3,985	−30.3%	13,145
Macon	20,127	41.1%	27,072	55.3%	1,750	3.5%	−6,945	−14.2%	48,949
Macoupin	8,334	35.2%	14,555	61.5%	785	3.3%	−6,221	−26.3%	23,674
Madison	59,178	43.7%	71,658	52.9%	4,652	3.5%	−12,480	−9.2%	135,488
Marion	5,122	29.7%	11,718	67.9%	414	2.3%	−6,596	−38.2%	17,254
Marshall	2,027	32.8%	3,957	63.9%	205	3.3%	−1,930	−31.1%	6,189
Mason	2,387	35.8%	4,075	61.1%	203	3.1%	−1,688	−25.3%	6,665
Massac	1,857	27.7%	4,712	70.2%	141	2.1%	−2,855	−42.5%	6,710
McDonough	5,090	41.9%	6,674	54.9%	384	3.2%	−1,584	−13.0%	12,148
McHenry	73,803	45.4%	80,440	49.4%	8,487	5.2%	−6,637	−4.0%	162,730
McLean	41,549	48.0%	41,007	47.4%	3,955	4.6%	542	0.6%	86,511
Menard	2,095	30.6%	4,606	67.3%	144	2.1%	−2,511	−36.7%	6,845
Mercer	3,420	39.1%	5,068	58.0%	256	2.9%	−1,648	−18.9%	8,744
Monroe	6,717	32.0%	13,805	65.7%	493	2.4%	−7,088	−33.7%	21,015
Montgomery	4,293	31.9%	8,738	65.0%	408	3.0%	−4,445	−33.1%	13,439
Morgan	5,548	36.6%	9,213	60.8%	394	2.6%	−3,665	−24.2%	15,155
Moultrie	1,816	27.2%	4,650	69.7%	210	3.2%	−2,834	−42.5%	6,676
Ogle	9,492	36.4%	15,520	59.6%	1,042	4.0%	−6,028	−23.2%	26,054
Peoria	42,891	51.3%	37,345	44.7%	3,397	4.1%	5,546	6.6%	83,633
Perry	3,268	33.0%	6,417	64.8%	216	2.2%	−3,149	−31.8%	9,901
Piatt	3,407	34.9%	6,004	61.5%	347	3.5%	−2,597	−26.6%	9,758
Pike	1,837	23.5%	5,785	74.0%	193	2.5%	−3,948	−50.5%	7,815
Pope	520	24.4%	1,573	73.9%	35	1.7%	−1,053	−49.5%	2,128
Pulaski	1,066	41.4%	1,466	56.9%	44	1.7%	−400	−15.5%	2,576
Putnam	1,459	44.3%	1,706	51.7%	132	3.9%	−247	−7.4%	3,297
Randolph	4,645	31.7%	9,741	66.4%	285	1.9%	−5,096	−34.7%	14,671
Richland	1,932	24.4%	5,777	73.0%	204	2.6%	−3,845	−48.6%	7,913
Rock Island	36,493	55.2%	27,705	41.9%	1,965	2.9%	8,788	13.3%	66,163
Saline	3,246	30.1%	7,267	67.3%	280	2.3%	−4,021	−37.2%	10,793
Sangamon	48,733	46.7%	52,333	50.2%	3,256	3.1%	−3,600	−3.5%	104,322
Schuyler	1,283	33.4%	2,448	63.7%	115	2.9%	−1,165	−30.3%	3,846
Scott	705	26.3%	1,930	72.0%	46	1.7%	−1,225	−45.7%	2,681
Shelby	2,921	24.5%	8,698	72.8%	326	2.7%	−5,777	−48.3%	11,945
St. Clair	66,801	52.6%	55,898	44.0%	4,242	3.3%	10,903	8.6%	126,941
Stark	843	29.8%	1,894	67.0%	90	3.1%	−1,051	−37.2%	2,827
Stephenson	9,043	41.5%	11,954	54.8%	801	3.6%	−2,911	−13.3%	21,798
Tazewell	25,380	37.1%	40,429	59.1%	2,628	3.8%	−15,049	−22.0%	68,437
Union	3,102	35.3%	5,465	62.1%	230	2.6%	−2,363	−26.8%	8,797
Vermilion	11,375	36.3%	18,751	59.9%	1,199	3.8%	−7,376	−23.6%	31,325
Wabash	1,276	23.3%	4,078	74.3%	133	2.4%	−2,802	−51.0%	5,487
Warren	3,049	39.1%	4,552	58.4%	196	2.5%	−1,503	−19.3%	7,797
Washington	1,914	24.6%	5,671	73.0%	181	2.4%	−3,757	−48.4%	7,766
Wayne	1,401	16.9%	6,708	80.8%	198	2.3%	−5,307	−63.9%	8,307
White	1,686	23.2%	5,400	74.3%	183	2.5%	−3,714	−51.1%	7,269
Whiteside	12,502	46.3%	13,502	50.0%	988	3.7%	−1,000	−3.7%	26,992
Will	175,089	51.2%	144,816	42.4%	21,953	6.5%	30,273	8.8%	341,858
Williamson	11,473	34.6%	20,679	62.4%	964	2.9%	−9,206	−27.8%	33,116
Winnebago	61,182	48.4%	60,473	47.8%	4,733	3.7%	709	0.6%	126,388
Woodford	6,276	29.7%	14,174	67.1%	687	3.3%	−7,898	−37.4%	21,137
Totals	3,278,930	54.9%	2,319,870	38.9%	370,101	6.2%	959,060	16.0%	5,968,901

Counties that flipped from Democratic to Republican

- Alexander (largest city: Cairo)
- Calhoun (largest village: Hardin)
- Fulton (largest city: Canton)
- Gallatin (largest city: Shawneetown)
- Henderson (largest village: Oquawka)
- Knox (largest city: Galesburg)
- Pulaski (largest city: Mounds)
- Whiteside (largest city: Sterling)

Counties that flipped from Republican to Democratic

- DeKalb (largest city: DeKalb)
- DuPage (largest city: Aurora)
- Kane (largest city: Aurora)
- Kendall (largest village: Oswego)
- McLean (largest city: Bloomington)
- Peoria (largest city: Peoria)
- Will (largest city: Joliet)
- Winnebago (largest city: Rockford)

==== By congressional district ====
Durbin won 12 of the 18 congressional districts, with the remaining six going to Curran, including one that elected a Democrat.

District	Durbin	Curran	Representative
1st	64%	22%	Bobby Rush
2nd	68%	18%	Robin Kelly
3rd	55%	37%	Dan Lipinski
3rd	55%	37%	Marie Newman
4th	78%	14%	Chuy García
5th	69%	25%	Mike Quigley
6th	51%	44%	Sean Casten
7th	75%	12%	Danny Davis
8th	58%	37%	Raja Krishnamoorthi
9th	68%	27%	Jan Schakowsky
10th	60%	36%	Brad Schneider
11th	59%	35%	Bill Foster
12th	44%	53%	Mike Bost
13th	47.7%	48.3%	Rodney Davis
14th	47%	48%	Lauren Underwood
15th	29%	68%	Mary Miller
16th	41%	55%	Adam Kinzinger
17th	49%	48%	Cheri Bustos
18th	37%	60%	Darin LaHood

== Notes ==
Partisan clients
