= Jerry Weller =

American politician (born 1957)

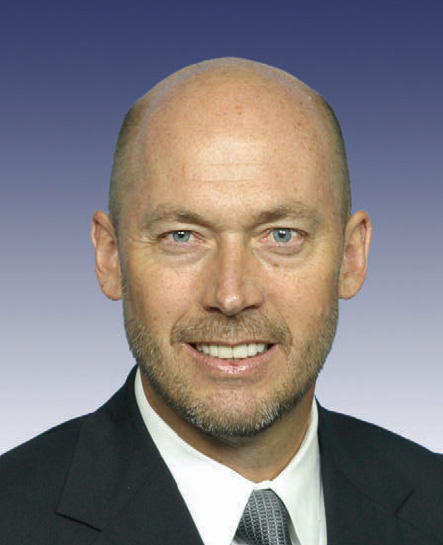

Member of the U.S. House of Representatives from Illinois's 11th district
- In office January 3, 1995 – January 3, 2009
- Preceded by: George Sangmeister
- Succeeded by: Debbie Halvorson

Member of the Illinois House of Representatives
- In office January 3, 1989 – January 3, 1995
- Preceded by: Ray A. Christensen
- Succeeded by: Stephen Spangler
- Constituency: 85th district (1989–1993); 75th district (1993–1995)

Member of the Illinois House of Representatives from the 85th district
- In office January 3, 1987 – April 2, 1987
- Preceded by: Ray A. Christensen
- Succeeded by: Ray A. Christensen

Personal details
- Born: Gerald Cameron Weller; July 7, 1957 (age 69) Streator, Illinois, U.S.
- Party: Republican
- Spouse: Zury Ríos (m. 2004, divorced)
- Education: University of Illinois, Urbana-Champaign (BS)

Gerald Cameron Weller (born July 7, 1957) is an American politician who was a Republican member of the U.S. House of Representatives, representing Illinois's 11th congressional district. As of 2015, Weller is the managing principal of New World Group Public Affairs, a lobbying group with offices in Washington, DC, Florida and Guatemala. He was also a Global Development Officer for an IPTV company called VIPTV.

== Early life, education, and early political career ==
Weller was born in Streator, Illinois, to LaVern and Marilyn Weller, and raised on his family's hog farm in Dwight, Illinois. Weller is a 1979 graduate of the University of Illinois where he received his degree in agriculture. Weller has been married twice.

Weller was a staff member for U.S. Congressman Tom Corcoran from 1980 to 1981, assistant to the director of the Illinois Department of Agriculture, and an aide to Secretary of Agriculture John R. Block from 1981 to 1985.

In the 1986 general election, Weller challenged incumbent Democratic Representative Ray A. Christensen in the 85th district. In the official result, Weller won by a four-vote margin, 14,217 to 14,213. Christensen challenged the result while Weller was sworn in as the State Representative. The Illinois House of Representatives set up a House Committee on Election Contests which heard the two candidates' challenges. In a party line vote, the House voted to unseat Weller and seat Christensen.

In the 1988 election, Weller was elected to the Illinois House of Representatives defeating Democratic candidate and Grundy County Clerk Lana Phillips after Christensen opted to retire. Weller was succeeded by Grundy County Board member Stephen Spangler.

== U.S. House of Representatives ==
=== Tenure ===
Weller was elected to the U.S. House of Representatives in 1994 following the retirement of Democrat George Sangmeister. Weller won a crowded Republican primary, and defeated fellow State Representative Frank Giglio in the general election.

In 1995, Weller received an Environmental Protector Award from the Chicago Audubon Society for his political service. After a release of tritium from Exelon's Braidwood and Dresden Nuclear Power Plant Weller sent a letter to Exelon Corp expressing his concern and recommended that the Nuclear Regulatory Commission investigate the power plants in question.

In 2002, a Federal Election Commission audit found a fund used by Weller for his re-election in 2000 received almost $11,000 that appeared to have violated federal campaign rules on the size and source of donations. Weller's fund returned all of the questioned contributions but did not admit deliberately violating any laws.

On October 10, 2002, Weller voted with the 296-133 majority in favor of authorizing the invasion of Iraq.

Weller served as Deputy Minority Whip. On September 21, 2007, Weller announced that he would not seek another term, citing the need to spend more time with his family.

Weller supported free trade when serving in Congress and traveled throughout Latin America and the Caribbean to build better relationships with public sector and business leaders. He was the number one supporter for the Panama trade agreement with the United States.

Weller made efforts to eliminate the marriage penalty tax. He supported the use of tax incentives to help redevelop brownfield formal industrial land, developing a proposal with Democrats, such as Chicago Mayor Richard M. Daley, to do so.

Weller championed the creation of the Abraham Lincoln National Cemetery, the Midewin National Tallgrass Prairie and other redevelopment efforts at the former Joliet arsenal. Redevelopment of the site included the Deer Run Industrial Park, which contains the CenterPoint Intermodal Center, a new intermodal freight transport center.

Weller supported plans for the Illiana Expressway.

Weller voted again to raise the minimum wage in the 110th Congress.

Weller sponsored a bill to expand concurrent receipt for wounded military veterans, but it did not pass.

Weller sponsored a bill to make the residential energy efficient property credit permanent, which never left committee.

Weller promised prior to his marriage to Guatemalan Congresswoman Zury Mayté Ríos Sosa de Weller, that he would not vote on any legislation involving solely the U.S. and Guatemala. His advocacy and vote for CAFTA caused controversy however, despite it being a multi-nation agreement. Weller has long supported free-trade agreements. As a FRG party leader, his wife was also a supporter of CAFTA.

Weller accepted money from two convicted associates of former congressman Duke Cunningham. Weller's spokesman said that the donations probably originated from his support of the research and development tax credit and the money was donated to a charity in Oregon. Weller and 11 other congressmen were subpoenaed to testify in the trial of Brent R. Wilkes, the contractor accused of bribing Cunningham. The subpoenas were withdrawn by defense attorneys on October 3, 2007 when it became apparent the trial judge would quash them anyway. Weller and the other 11 did not testify in the trial.

Weller was the only member of the House of Representatives to abstain in the vote for the proposed bailout of U.S. financial system (2008).

=== Committees ===
Weller was on the following committees at various times:

- Committee on Ways & Means (-2008)
  - Subcommittee on Income Security and Family Support (Ranking Member) (-2008)
  - Subcommittee on Trade
- Committee On International Relations (-2006)

== Personal life ==
In July 2004, Weller announced that he was engaged to three-term Guatemalan Congresswoman Zury Mayté Ríos Sosa, daughter of former Guatemalan dictator Efraín Ríos Montt. On November 20, 2004, the two married at her father's home in Antigua Guatemala; this was his second marriage and her fourth. (Zury Ríos has also used the combined parental surname, Ríos Sosa, following the naming customs of Hispanic America; during this marriage, her personal website used the hybrid married form "Ríos-Montt de Weller".)

In August 2006, a daughter, Marizú Catherine, was born in a hospital in Guatemala City.

Weller and Ríos have since divorced.

=== Properties in Nicaragua ===
On October 25, 2006, the Chicago Reader reported that Weller had disclosed three parcels of land he owned in Nicaragua on his financial disclosure forms: one purchased in 2002, one purchased in April 2004, and one purchased in December 2005. The newspaper also reported that it had obtained notarized bills of sale for three more lots owned by Weller that had never been listed on his forms: a lot sold in February 2005, a lot purchased in March 2005, and lot purchased in April 2005. The failure to properly disclosure property ownership was alleged to be a violation of the Ethics in Government Act and the False Statements Accountability Act of 1996.

Weller's lawyer said that he couldn't comment because of the attorney-client privilege. Weller's campaign manager said Weller "does not own three more parcels in Nicaragua. He does not own six parcels in Nicaragua. He has filed his disclosure for everything that he owns."

On September 7, 2007, the Chicago Tribune disclosed the results of their own investigation into his land deals, including discrepancies on declared prices and numbers of transactions, centered in the Playa Coco resort area. For example, Weller listed only one Nicaraguan property purchase on his 2005 disclosure form, but property records in Nicaragua showed that he bought or sold at least eight pieces of land. No inquiry was ever launched by the Democratically-controlled House, but Weller announced that he would not seek reelection on September 21, 2007.

== See also ==
- 2008 United States House of Representatives elections in Illinois

U.S. House of Representatives
Preceded by George Sangmeister	Member of the U.S. House of Representatives from Illinois's 11th congressional district 1995–2009	Succeeded by Debbie Halvorson
U.S. order of precedence (ceremonial)
Preceded by Larry Bucshon as Former U.S. Representative	Order of precedence of the United States as Former U.S. Representative	Succeeded by Judy Biggert as Former U.S. Representative
