= List of first minority male lawyers and judges in Illinois =

This is a list of the first minority male lawyer(s) and judge(s) in Illinois. It includes the year in which the men were admitted to practice law (in parentheses). Also included are other distinctions such as the first minority men in their state to graduate from law school or become a political figure.

== Firsts in state history ==
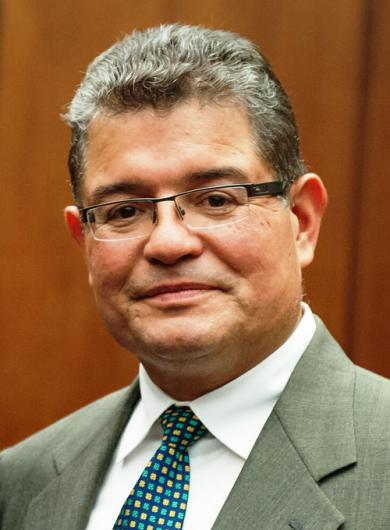
Ruben Castillo: First Hispanic American male Judge of the U.S. District Court for the Northern District of Illinois (1994)

=== Lawyers ===
- Lloyd Garrison Wheeler (1869): First African American male admitted to the Illinois State Bar. However, he relocated soon after to Arkansas.
- Sebastian Rivera (1926): First Puerto Rican male lawyer in Illinois
- Edward Hong (1941): First Chinese American male lawyer in Illinois
- Antonio Rosas Sarabia (1950): First Mexican American male lawyer in Illinois
- Theodore "Ted" Burtzos: First deaf male lawyer to argue a case before a jury in Illinois

=== State judges ===
- John J. Bird: First African American male magistrate (1873) and justice of the peace (1881) in Illinois
- Albert B. George: First African American male judge in Illinois (1924)
- Bernard P. Barasa: First Italian American male judge in Illinois (c. 1920s)
- James K. Chelos: First Greek American male judge in Illinois (1952)
- David Cerda: First Latino American male judge in Illinois (1965) and serve on the Illinois Appellate Court (1989)
- George N. Leighton (1947): First African American male to serve on the First District Appellate Court in Illinois (1969)
- Joseph H. Goldenhersh: First Jewish American male to serve on the Supreme Court of Illinois (1970)
- Jose R. Vasquez: First Puerto Rican male judge in Illinois (1976)
- Charles E. Freeman (1962): First African American male to serve on the Illinois Supreme Court (1990) and serve as its Chief Justice
- F. Keith Brown (1981): First African American male judge to serve as a Chief Judge in the Sixteenth Judicial District Court (Kane County, Illinois; 1991)
- Thomas R. Chiola (1974): First openly LGBT male judge in Illinois (1994)
- Sebastian Patti: First openly LGBT male to serve as an appellate court judge in Illinois (1995)
- Theodore "Ted" Burtzos: First deaf male judge in Illinois (1995)
- Kenneth Moy: First Asian American male judge in Illinois (1996)
- Samuel J. Betar III: First Arab American male judge in Illinois (1998)
- Young B. Kim: First Korean American male judge in Illinois (upon his appointment as an Administrative Judge in 2001)
- Israel Desierto: First Filipino American male judge in Illinois (2005)
- Lionel Jean-Baptiste: First Haitian American male judge in Illinois (2011)
- Jesse G. Reyes (1982): First Latino American male elected as a Judge of the Illinois Appellate Court (2012)
- Jorge L. Ortiz (1989): First Hispanic American male to serve as the Chief Judge of an Illinois court (2016)
- Rouhy J. Shalabi: First Palestinian American and Muslim American judge in Illinois (2020)
- Sanjay Tailor: First Asian American (who is of Indian descent) male to serve as a presiding judge in Illinois (2021). He is also the first Indian American male appointed to the Illinois Appellate Court (2023) and Supreme Court of Illinois (2026).

=== Federal judges ===
- James Benton Parsons (1949): First African American male to serve on the U.S. District Court for the Northern District of Illinois (1961)
- Alexander J. Napoli: First Italian American male to serve on the United States District Court for the Northern District of Illinois (1966)
- George N. Leighton: First Cape Verdean male to serve as a Judge of the United States District Court for the Northern District of Illinois (1976)
- Joe Billy McDade (1963): First African American male to serve on the U.S. District Court for the Central District of Illinois (1991)
- Ruben Castillo (1979): First Latino American male to serve on the U.S. District Court for the Northern District of Illinois (1994)
- Manuel Barbosa: First Hispanic American male bankruptcy judge to serve in the U.S. Northern District of Illinois (1998)
- Samuel Der-Yeghiayan (1978): First Armenian immigrant male to serve on the U.S. District Court for the Northern District of Illinois (2003)
- Fernando L. Engelsma: First minority (male) appointed as a Judge of the 17th Judicial Circuit Court in Illinois (2005)
- Edmond E. Chang: First Asian American (male who is of Taiwanese descent) to serve on the United States District Court for the Northern District of Illinois (2010)
- James Shadid: First Arab American male to serve on the United States District Court for the Central District of Illinois (2011)
- John Z. Lee (1992): First Korean American male to serve on the United States District Court for the Northern District of Illinois (2012)
- Manish S. Shah (1998): First Indian American male to serve on the U.S. District Court for the Northern District of Illinois (2014)
- Sunil Harjani: First South Asian to serve as a Magistrate Judge of the U.S. District Court for the Northern District of Illinois (2019)
- Franklin U. Valderrama: First Panamanian American male to serve as a Judge of the U.S. District Court for the Northern District of Illinois (2020)

=== Attorney General ===
- Roland Burris (1963): First African American male elected as the Attorney General of Illinois (1991-1995)
- Kwame Raoul: First Haitian American male elected as the Attorney General of Illinois (2019)

=== Assistant Attorney General ===
- James G. Gotter: First African American male to serve as the Assistant Attorney General of Illinois (1917)

=== United States Attorney ===
- Gregory K. Harris: First African American male to serve as the United States Attorney for the Central District of Illinois (2021)

=== State's Attorney ===
- James R. Burgess, Jr.: First African American male to serve as the State's Attorney in Illinois (1972)

=== Assistant State's Attorney ===
- Ferdinand Lee Barnett: First African American male to serve as an Assistant State's Attorney in Illinois (1896)

=== Bar Association ===
- Lawrence X. Pusateri: First Italian American male to serve as the President of the Illinois State Bar Association (1975)
- Vincent Cornelius: First African American male to serve as the Illinois State Bar Association (2016)

== Firsts in local history ==
- K. Patrick Yarbrough: First African American male judge in Boone and Winnebago Counties, Illinois (2008)
- Chester Blair: First African American male to serve as the President of the Chicago Bar Association [Cook and DuPage Counties, Illinois]
- René A. Torrado, Jr.: First Latino American male to serve as the President of the Chicago Bar Association (1995) [Cook and DuPage Counties, Illinois]
- Moses Suarez: First Latino American male to serve as President of the Lesbian and Gay Bar Association of Chicago (2019) [Cook and DuPage Counties, Illinois]
- Joe Somers: First African American male to serve as the Justice of the Peace in Champaign County, Illinois (1961)
- James R. Burgess, Jr.: First African American male to serve as the State's Attorney of Champaign County, Illinois (1972)
- Richard A. Dawson (1870): First African American male to graduate from the University of Chicago's law department
- Cecil A. Partee: First African American male to serve as the State's Attorney of Cook County, Illinois
- James K. Chelos: First Greek American male elected as a judge in Cook County, Illinois (1952)
- James Benton Parsons (1949): First African American male to serve as a Judge of the Superior Court of Cook County, Illinois (1959
- William J. Haddad: First Arab American male to serve as a Judge (2003) and Chief Judge (2023) of the Circuit Court in Cook County, Illinois
- Israel Desierto: First Filipino American male to serve as an Associate Judge of the Circuit Court of Cook County, Illinois (2005)
- Sanjay Tailor: First Indian American male appointed as an Associate Judge in Cook County, Illinois
- Edmund Ponce de Leon: First Hispanic American male to serve as the Presiding Judge of the Circuit Court of Cook County, Illinois (2010)
- Kenneth Moy: First Asian American male appointed as Judge of the DuPage County Circuit Court (1996)
- Charles Willner (1876): First Jewish male lawyer in Burlington, Illinois [Kane County, Illinois]
- F. Keith Brown (1981): First African American male judge and Chief Judge in the Sixteenth Judicial District (Kane County, Illinois; 1991)
- John Dalton: First openly LGBT male judge in Kane County, Illinois (2012)
- Rene Cruz: First Hispanic American male to serve as an associate judge in Kane County, Illinois (2012)
- George Bridges (1987): First African American male judge in Lake County, Illinois
- Jorge L. Ortiz (1989): First Hispanic American male judge in Lake County, Illinois (2002) and first Chief Judge (2016)
- George Bridges: First African American male judge in Waukegan, Lake County, Illinois (1995)
- Clayton R. Williams (c. 1940s): First African American male lawyer in Madison County, Illinois. He would later become a judge.
- Mario J. Perez: First Latino American male lawyer in McHenry County, Illinois
- Carlos S. Arevalo: First Hispanic American to serve as the President of the McHenry County Bar Association, Illinois (2014)
- Abraham Morris Williams: First African American male lawyer in Sangamon County, Illinois
- Noah Parden: First African American lawyer and Assistant County Prosecutor in St. Clair County, Illinois
- David Garcia: First Latino American male judge in Will County, Illinois (2013)

== See also ==
- List of first minority male lawyers and judges in the United States

== Other topics of interest ==
- List of first women lawyers and judges in the United States
- List of first women lawyers and judges in Illinois
