= List of University of Illinois Chicago School of Law people =

Alumni

Following is a list of notable alumni and faculty of the University of Illinois Chicago School of Law.

== Alumni ==
- Charles F. Armstrong – Illinois state representative and lawyer
- Donald W. Banner – United States Commissioner of Patents and Trademarks 1978–1979.
- Dan Bellino – Major League Baseball Baseball umpire.
- Femi Gbaja Biamila – Nigerian Lawyer, Action Congress politician, and Minority Whip of the House of Representatives of Nigeria.
- Joe Birkett – DuPage County State's Attorney and former Republican nominee for Illinois Lieutenant Governor.
- Otto Bock – former justice of the Colorado Supreme Court.
- Michael J. Burke – Illinois Supreme Court Justice
- Archibald Carey, Jr. – Judge, Chicago alderman and pastor of Quinn Chapel AME Church.
- John W. Cox, Jr. – Democratic member of the United States House of Representatives from the 16th District of Illinois from 1991 to 1993.
- William M. Daley – former White House Chief Of Staff under President Barack Obama. Served as U.S. Secretary of Commerce from 1997 to 2000.
- Chauncey Eskridge – lawyer for Martin Luther King Jr. and Muhammad Ali
- Timothy C. Evans – Chief Judge of the Circuit Court of Cook County.
- Thomas W. Ewing – Republican member of the United States House of Representatives from the 15th District of Illinois from 1991 to 2001.
- Thomas R. Fitzgerald – former chief justice of the Illinois Supreme Court.
- Charles E. Freeman – first African-American justice of the Illinois Supreme Court.
- Michael Hastings – Democratic member of the Illinois Senate, representing the 19th District since 2013.
- Michael Holewinski – Illinois state legislator and lawyer
- Iain D. Johnston – United States district judge of the United States District Court for the Northern District of Illinois
- William E. King, John Marshall Law School, state legislator
- Darin LaHood – Republican member of the United States House of Representatives from the 18th District of Illinois from 2015 to present.
- LeRoy Lemke – Illinois state legislator and lawyer
- Blanche M. Manning – United States District Court Judge for the Northern District of Illinois.
- Howard Thomas Markey – first chief judge of the United States Court of Appeals for the Federal Circuit and former dean of The John Marshall Law School.
- Adrian Neritani – former permanent representative of Albania to the United Nations.
- Michael Noland – Democratic member of the Illinois Senate, representing the 22nd District since 2007.
- Charles Ronald Norgle Sr. – United States district judge for the U.S. District Court for the Northern District of Illinois.
- Anthony J. Peraica – former Cook County commissioner (2 terms, 16th Dist.) and attorney.
- Mark Pedowitz – current president of The CW Television Network.
- Mara Candelaria Reardon – Indiana state representative for the 12th District (2007–2015 and 2017 – present)
- Alexander J. Resa – U.S. representative from Illinois from 1945 to 1947.
- Edith S. Sampson – first Black U.S. delegate appointed to the United Nations.
- Evelyn Sanguinetti – first Latina Lieutenant governor (United States) in U.S. history and lieutenant governor of Illinois (2015 to 2019).
- James E. Shadid – District Court Judge for the United States District Court for the Central District of Illinois.
- Ira Silverstein – Democratic member of the Illinois Senate, representing the 8th District since 1999.
- John Smietanka – Prosecutor for Berrien County, Michigan from 1974 to 1981, and a United States Attorney in Western Michigan, appointed by Ronald Reagan, from 1981 until 1994.
- Wanda Stopa – Chicago's first woman assistant U.S. district attorney.
- David Ivar Swanson – Illinois state representative for the 11th District (1922–46 and 1948–50).
- Emanuel Chris Welch – Illinois speaker of the house and state representative
- Kenneth Wendt – former member of the Illinois House of Representatives and judge of the Circuit Court of Cook County.
- Michael J. Zalewski – Illinois state representative for the 23rd District (2008 to present).

== Faculty ==
- John W. Darrah – United States district judge
- William Meade Fletcher taught at The John Marshall Law School in its first decade before becoming a member of the Virginia Corporation Commission
- Elmer Gertz – lawyer, writer and civil rights activist, best known as the plaintiff in Gertz v. Robert Welch, Inc.
- Arthur J. Goldberg – taught at The John Marshall Law School in the 1930s, 1940s, and 1950s before becoming a U.S. Supreme Court Associate Justice and then the U.S. Ambassador to the United Nations.
- Fred F. Herzog – former dean and the only Jewish judge to serve in Austria between the world wars.
- Matthew Prince – co-founder and CEO of Cloudflare.
- Ann Claire Williams – United States circuit judge for the U.S. Court of Appeals for the Seventh Circuit.
