= 2012 Illinois judicial elections =

- November 6, 2012

The 2012 Illinois judicial elections consisted of both partisan and retention elections, including those one seat of the Supreme Court of Illinois for ten seats in the Illinois Appellate Court. Primary elections were held on March 20, 2012, and general elections were held on November 6, 2012. These elections were part of the 2012 Illinois elections.

== Supreme Court of Illinois ==
Justices of the Supreme Court of Illinois are elected by district. One seat held a partisan election, while another held a retention election.

The court has seven seats total separated into five districts. The first district, representing Cook County, contains three seats, making it a multi-member district, while other four districts are single-member districts. Justices hold ten year terms.

=== 1st district ===
In October 2010, Democrat Mary Jane Theis was appointed by the Supreme Court to fill the vacancy left by the retirement of justice Thomas R. Fitzgerald. Theis successfully ran for election to fill this seat for a full term.

==== Democratic primary ====
Supreme Court of Illinois 1st district Democratic primary
Party	Candidate	Votes	%
Democratic	Mary Jane Theis (incumbent)	193,863	48.37
Democratic	Joy Cunningham	91,639	22.87
Democratic	Aurelia Marie Pucinski	85,554	21.35
Democratic	Thomas W. Flannigan	29,708	7.41
Total votes		537,239	100

==== Republican primary ====
No candidates ran in the primary for the Republican nomination. Republicans ultimately nominated James Gerard Riley.

==== General election ====
Supreme Court of Illinois 1st district election
Party	Candidate	Votes	%
Democratic	Mary Jane Theis (incumbent)	1,333,122	74.72
Republican	James Gerard Riley	451,039	25.28
Total votes		1,784,161	100

The court has seven seats total separated into five districts. The first district contains three seats (making it a multi-member district), while other four districts are single-member districts. Justices hold ten year terms.

=== Retention elections ===
To be retained, judges were required to have 60% of their vote be "yes".

District	Incumbent				Vote		Cite
District	Party	Name	In office since	Previous years elected/retained	Yes (Retain)	No (Remove)	Cite
3rd	Republican	Rita B. Garman	February 1, 2001	2002 (elected)	389,891 (82.81%)	80,929 (17.19%)	

== Illinois Appellate Court ==
Illinois Appellate Court justices hold ten-year terms.

=== 1st district (Cahill vacancy) ===
A vacancy was created by the death of Robert Cahill. Matthias William Delort was elected to fill the judgeship. This was a regular election, as Cahill's term would have ended in 2012.

==== Democratic primary ====
Candidates

- Matthias William Delort, Cook County Circuit Court judge
- Mary Brigid Hayes, member of the Village of La Grange Park Police Commission
- Kay Marie Hanlon, Northfield Township trustee
- Pamela E. Hill-Veal, Cook County Circuit Court judge
- James Michael McGing, 1992 Democratic nominee for Illinois State Senate 7th district
- Laura Marie Sullivan, Cook County Circuit Court judge

Results

Illinois Appellate Court 1st district (Cahill vacancy) Democratic primary
Party	Candidate	Votes	%
Democratic	Matthias William Delort	90,855	24.82
Democratic	Pamela E. Hill-Veal	83,463	22.80
Democratic	Laura Marie Sullivan	65,293	17.84
Democratic	Mary Brigid Hayes	57,909	15.82
Democratic	James Michael McGing	34,353	9.38
Democratic	Kay Marie Hanlon	34,215	9.35
Total votes		366,088	100

==== Republican primary ====
No candidates ran in the primary for the Republican nomination.

==== General election ====
Illinois Appellate Court 1st district (Cahill vacancy) election
Party	Candidate	Votes	%
Democratic	Matthias William Delort	1,381,611	100
Total votes		1,381,611	100

=== 1st district (Coleman vacancy) ===
A vacancy was created when Sharon Johnson Coleman stepped down in order to accept a position on the United States District Court for the Northern District of Illinois. Nathaniel Roosevelt Howse, Jr. was elected to fill the judgeship. Before being elected to this judgeship, Howse had already been serving on the Appellate Court, having been appointed to a different 1st district judgeship in August 2009, after the retirement of Denise M. O'Malley. This was a regular election, as Coleman's term would have ended in 2012.

==== Democratic primary ====
Illinois Appellate Court 1st district (Coleman vacancy) Democratic primary
Party	Candidate	Votes	%
Democratic	Nathaniel Roosevelt Howse, Jr.	242,772	100
Total votes		242,772	100

==== Republican primary ====
No candidates ran in the primary for the Republican nomination.

==== General election ====
Illinois Appellate Court 1st district (Coleman vacancy) election
Party	Candidate	Votes	%
Democratic	Nathaniel Roosevelt Howse, Jr.	1,334,521	100
Total votes		1,334,521	100

=== 1st district (Gallagher vacancy) ===
A vacancy was created when Michael Gallagher retired. P. Scott Neville Jr. was elected to fill the judgeship. Before being elected to this judgeship, Neville had already been serving on the Appellate Court, having been served as an appointed member of the first district since 2004.

==== Democratic primary ====
Candidates

- P. Scott Neville Jr., Illinois Appellate Court judge
- Marguerite Quinn, Cook County Circuit Court judge
- Patrick J. Sherlock, Cook County Circuit Court judge

Results

Illinois Appellate Court 1st district (Gallagher vacancy) Democratic primary
Party	Candidate	Votes	%
Democratic	P. Scott Neville, Jr.	159,170	44.30
Democratic	Marguerite Quinn	119,865	33.36
Democratic	Patrick J. Sherlock	80,256	22.34
Total votes		359,291	100

==== Republican primary ====
No candidates ran in the primary for the Republican nomination.

==== General election ====
Illinois Appellate Court 1st district (Gallagher vacancy) election
Party	Candidate	Votes	%
Democratic	P. Scott Neville, Jr.	1,306,485	100
Total votes		1,306,485	100

=== 1st district (O'Brien vacancy) ===
A vacancy was created when Sheila O'Brien retired in 2011. Jesse G. Reyes was elected to fill the judgeship.

==== Democratic primary ====
Candidates

- William Stewart Boyd, Cook County Circuit Court judge
- Ellen L. Flannigan, Cook County Circuit Court judge
- Rodolfo "Rudy" Garcia, Illinois Appellate Court judge
- Jesse G. Reyes, Cook County Circuit Court judge
- Don R. Sampen, former Illinois assistant attorney general

Results

Illinois Appellate Court 1st district (O'Brien vacancy) Democratic primary
Party	Candidate	Votes	%
Democratic	Jesse G. Reyes	120,390	33.04
Democratic	William Stewart Boyd	93,912	25.77
Democratic	Ellen L. Flannigan	80,668	22.14
Democratic	Rodolfo "Rudy" Garcia	45,539	12.5
Democratic	Don R. Sampen	23,873	6.55
Total votes		364,382	100

==== Republican primary ====
No candidates ran in the primary for the Republican nomination.

==== General election ====
Illinois Appellate Court 1st district (O'Brien vacancy) election
Party	Candidate	Votes	%
Democratic	Jesse G. Reyes	1,317,266	100
Total votes		1,317,266	100

=== 1st district (Theis vacancy) ===
A vacancy was created when Mary Jane Theis was appointed to the Illinois Supreme Court in 2010. Maureen Connors, who had been appointed in October 2010 to fill the judgeship until a permanent occupant would be elected in 2012, was elected to permanently fill the judgeship.

==== Democratic primary ====
Candidates

- Maureen Connors, incumbent occupant of the judgeship

Results

Illinois Appellate Court 1st district (Theis vacancy) Democratic primary
Party	Candidate	Votes	%
Democratic	Maureen Elizabeth Connors (incumbent)	325,268	100
Total votes		325,268	100

==== Republican primary ====
No candidates ran in the primary for the Republican nomination.

==== General election ====
Illinois Appellate Court 1st district (Theis vacancy) election
Party	Candidate	Votes	%
Democratic	Maureen Elizabeth Connors (incumbent)	1,316,225	100
Total votes		1,316,225	100

=== 1st district (Tully vacancy) ===
A vacancy was created when John Tully retired on December 31, 2009. Terrance J. Lavin, who had been appointed on February 1, 2010, to fill the judgeship until a permanent occupant would be elected in 2012, was elected to permanently fill the judgeship.

==== Democratic primary ====
Candidates

- Terrence J. Lavin, incumbent occupant of the judgeship

Results

Illinois Appellate Court 1st district (Tully vacancy) Democratic primary
Party	Candidate	Votes	%
Democratic	Terrence J. Lavin (incumbent)	319,241	100
Total votes		319,241	100

==== Republican primary ====
No candidates ran in the primary for the Republican nomination.

==== General election ====
Illinois Appellate Court 1st district (Tully vacancy) election
Party	Candidate	Votes	%
Democratic	Terrence J. Lavin (incumbent)	1,280,939	100
Total votes		1,280,939	100

=== 2nd district (O'Malley vacancy) ===
A vacancy was created when Jack O'Malley retired on December 3, 2010. Joseph Birkett, who had been appointed on fill the judgeship until a permanent occupant would be elected in 2012, was elected to permanently fill the judgeship.

==== Democratic primary ====
No candidates ran in the primary for the Democratic nomination.

==== Republican primary ====
Candidates

- Joseph Birkett, incumbent occupant of the judgeship

Results

Illinois Appellate Court 1st district (O'Malley vacancy) Republican primary
Party	Candidate	Votes	%
Republican	Joe Birkett (incumbent)	259,025	100
Total votes		259,025	100

==== General election ====
Illinois Appellate Court 1st district (O'Malley vacancy) election
Party	Candidate	Votes	%
Republican	Joe Birkett (incumbent)	946,823	100
Total votes		946,823	100

=== 4th district (Myerscough vacancy) ===
A vacancy was created when Sue E. Myerscough left her judgeship in the Illinois Appellate Court's 4th district to become a judge of the United States District Court for the Central District of Illinois in February 2010. Carol Pope was elected to fill the judgeship. Before being elected to this judgeship, Pope had already been serving on the Illinois Appellate Court's, having been appointed to a different 4th district judgeship in December 2008.

==== Democratic primary ====
No candidates ran in the primary for the Democratic nomination.

==== Republican primary ====
Candidates

- Carol Pope, Illinois Appellate Court judge

Results

Illinois Appellate Court 1st district (Myerscough vacancy) Republican primary
Party	Candidate	Votes	%
Republican	Carol Pope	115,826	100
Total votes		115,826	100

==== General election ====
Illinois Appellate Court 1st district (Myerscough vacancy) election
Party	Candidate	Votes	%
Republican	Carol Pope	428,665	100
Total votes		428,665	100

=== 5th district (Donovan vacancy) ===
A vacancy was created when James Donovan retired on December 2, 2012. Judy Cates was elected to fill the judgeship.

==== Democratic primary ====
Candidates

- Judy Cates, attorney and former St. Clair County state's attorney

Results

Illinois Appellate Court 1st district (Donovan vacancy) Democratic primary
Party	Candidate	Votes	%
Democratic	Judy Cates	52,050	100
Total votes		52,050	100

==== Republican primary ====
Candidates

- Stephen P. McGlynn, Illinois 20th Judicial Circuit judge and former Illinois Appellate Court judge

Results

Illinois Appellate Court 1st district (Donovan vacancy) Republican primary
Party	Candidate	Votes	%
Republican	Stephen McGlynn	79,925	100
Total votes		79,925	100

==== General election ====
Illinois Appellate Court 1st district (Donovan vacancy) election
Party	Candidate	Votes	%
Democratic	Judy Cates	283,926	52.09
Republican	Stephen McGlynn	261,170	47.91
Total votes		545,096	100

=== Retention elections ===
To be retained, judges were required to have 60% of their vote be "yes".

District	Incumbent				Vote		Cite
District	Party	Name	In office since	Previous years elected/retained	Yes (Retain)	No (Remove)	Cite
1st	Democratic	James Fitzgerald Smith	December 2, 2002	2002 (elected)	1,058,999 (79.81%)	267,955 (20.19%)	
3rd	Democratic	Tom M. Lytton	December 7, 1992	1992 (elected), 2002 (retained)	521,146 (79.72%)	132,560 (20.28%)	
3rd	Republican	Daniel L. Schmidt	December 2002	2002 (elected)	524,061 (80.40%)	127,776 (19.60%)	
4th	Republican	John Turner	June 2001	2002 (elected)	377,311 (82.10%)	82,273 (17.90%)	
5th	Democratic	Melissa Ann Chapman	September 2001	2002 (elected)	370,011 (73.76%)	131,601 (26.24%)	

== Lower courts ==
Lower courts also saw judicial elections.
