= Shadid =

Shadid may refer to:

- Shadid (‘Ad's son), a son of ‘Ad in Arabian belief
- Anthony Shadid (1968–2012), Lebanese-American journalist
- George Shadid (1929-2018), American politician
- James E. Shadid (born 1957), American judge
- Michael Shadid (1882–1966), Lebanese physician
