= Sue E. Myerscough =

American judge (born 1951)

Sue Myerscough
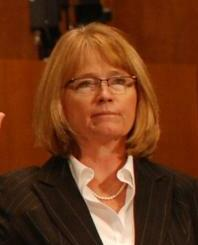
- Myerscough in 2014

Senior Judge of the United States District Court for the Central District of Illinois
- Incumbent
- Assumed office March 9, 2023

Judge of the United States District Court for the Central District of Illinois
- In office March 14, 2011 – March 9, 2023
- Appointed by: Barack Obama
- Preceded by: Jeanne E. Scott
- Succeeded by: Colleen Lawless

Personal details
- Born: 1951 (age 74–75) Springfield, Illinois, U.S.
- Party: Democratic
- Education: Southern Illinois University (BA, JD)

Sue Ellen Myerscough (/ˈmaɪ.ərzˌkoʊf/; born 1951) is a senior United States district judge of the United States District Court for the Central District of Illinois and a former justice on the Illinois Fourth District Appellate Court.

== Early life and education ==
Born in Springfield, Illinois, Myerscough received her Bachelor of Arts with honors from Southern Illinois University in 1973 and her Juris Doctor from Southern Illinois University School of Law in 1980 where she was an editor of the law review.

== Career ==
Myerscough served as a law clerk for Judge Harold Baker of the United States District Court for the Central District of Illinois and was in private practice in Springfield, Illinois from 1981 until her appointment as associate judge in 1987. Myerscough served as an associate judge until her election to the Illinois Circuit Courts in 1990, and in 1994 became Chief Judge of the Illinois Seventh Judicial Circuit and presiding judge of Sangamon County. She was elected to the Fourth District Appellate Court in 1998. She replaced Judge Frederick Green of Urbana who retired.

=== Federal judicial service ===
==== Withdrawn nomination to federal district court ====
On October 11, 1995, President Clinton nominated Myerscough to a seat on the United States District Court for the Central District of Illinois that was vacated by Judge Harold Baker, who assumed senior status in 1994. However, Myerscough withdrew her nomination. Clinton opted not to renominate Myerscough to the same seat the following year. Instead, he nominated Michael P. McCuskey to that seat in 1997 and was confirmed in 1998.

==== Renomination to federal district court under Obama ====
In February 2010, Senator Dick Durbin recommended Myerscough to President Obama for a seat on the district court. On June 17, 2010, President Obama renominated Myerscough to a federal district judgeship on the United States District Court for the Central District of Illinois. Myerscough was nominated to fill the vacancy created by Judge Joe Billy McDade, who assumed senior status on February 28, 2010. On July 14, 2010, Obama withdrew Myerscough's name to fill the McDade vacancy and instead renominated Myerscough to fill the vacancy being created by Judge Jeanne E. Scott, who retired on August 1, 2010. Myerscough's nomination was reported out of committee on February 17, 2011, by a voice vote. On March 7, 2011, the Senate confirmed her nomination by a voice vote. She received her commission on March 14, 2011. She assumed senior status on March 9, 2023.

Legal offices
Preceded by Jeanne E. Scott	Judge of the United States District Court for the Central District of Illinois; 2011–2023	Succeeded by Colleen Lawless
