= Rodger Heaton =

United States Attorney for the Central District of Illinois
- In office 2006–2009
- Appointed by: George W. Bush
- Preceded by: Jan Paul Miller
- Succeeded by: James Lewis

Personal details
- Party: Republican
- Education: University of Illinois (B.A.); Indiana University (J.D.)
- Profession: Attorney

Rodger A. Heaton is an American attorney who served as the United States Attorney for the Central District of Illinois from 2005 to 2009.

== Early life and career ==
Heaton was raised in Lexington, Illinois. He attended University of Illinois at Urbana–Champaign and Indiana University Maurer School of Law. He joined the U.S. Department of Justice in 1989. During the Whitewater controversy, Heaton took part in the successful prosecution of Jim Guy Tucker.

== United States Attorney ==
He was appointed the U.S. Attorney for the Central District of Illinois; the area's top law enforcement official. He was chosen out of a field that included Rick Winkel and Darin LaHood. In 2009, Heaton resigned and was succeeded by the First Assistant U.S. Attorney in an acting capacity. President Barack Obama appointed James Lewis as the new U.S. Attorney for Central Illinois in a permanent capacity.

== State government ==
In 2015, Bruce Rauner appointed Heaton his homeland security advisor and the Illinois Director of Public Safety. In 2017, he was promoted to Governor Rauner's Chief of Staff. He was Rauner's fourth Chief of Staff in three years. Heaton would go on to serve as Chief of Staff for the remainder of Rauner's time in office. On April 8, 2022, Governor J. B. Pritzker appointed Heaton to one of nine vacancies on the Illinois Prisoner Review Board and Heaton was confirmed by the Illinois Senate the next day. His term runs from May 1, 2022, to January 20, 2025.
