= Jonathan E. Hawley =

American judge (born 1971)

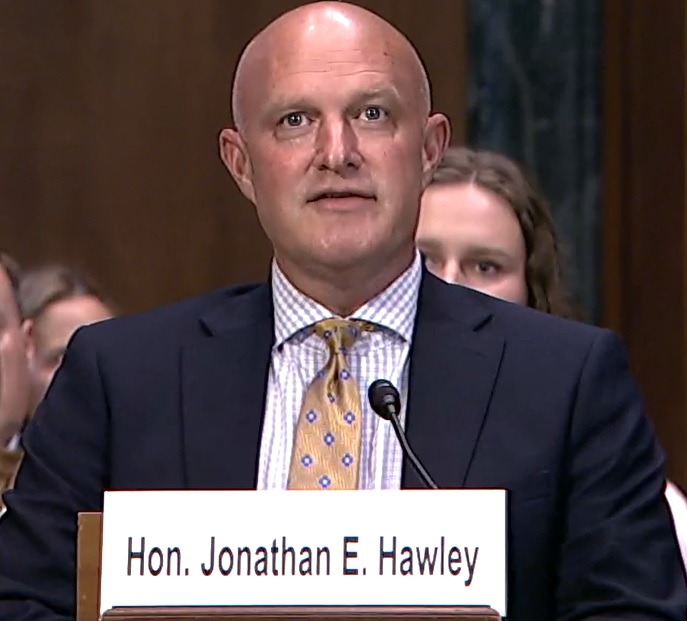

Judge of the United States District Court for the Central District of Illinois
- Incumbent
- Assumed office November 15, 2024
- Appointed by: Joe Biden
- Preceded by: James Shadid

Magistrate Judge of the United States District Court for the Central District of Illinois
- In office February 28, 2014 – November 15, 2024
- Preceded by: John A. Gorman
- Succeeded by: Ronald L. Hanna

Personal details
- Born: Jonathan Eugene Hawley; 1971 (age 54–55) Peoria, Illinois, U.S.
- Education: University of Illinois Chicago (BA); DePaul University (JD)

Jonathan Eugene Hawley (born 1971) is an American lawyer who has served as a United States district judge of the United States District Court for the Central District of Illinois since 2024. He previously served as a United States magistrate judge of the same court from 2014 to 2024.

== Education ==
Hawley received a Bachelor of Arts, cum laude, from the University of Illinois Chicago in 1992. Before attending law school, he did postgraduate work in philosophy and theology at St. Charles Borromeo Seminary in Philadelphia. He received a Juris Doctor, cum laude, from DePaul University College of Law in 1997.

== Career ==
From 1997 to 1998, Hawley served as a law clerk to Judge Michael P. McCuskey on the Illinois Third District Appellate Court and again on the U.S. District Court for the Central District of Illinois in 1998. From 1998 to 1999, he served as a law clerk for Justice James D. Heiple on the Illinois Supreme Court. From 1999 to 2014, Hawley served in the Federal Public Defender's Office for the Central District of Illinois.

=== Federal judicial service ===
On February 28, 2014, Hawley was selected to serve as a United States magistrate judge for the U.S. District Court for the Central District of Illinois to fill the vacancy left by the retirement of Judge John A. Gorman.

On July 3, 2024, President Joe Biden announced his intent to nominate Hawley to serve as a United States district judge of the United States District Court for the Central District of Illinois. On July 8, 2024, his nomination was sent to the Senate. President Biden nominated Hawley to the seat being vacated by Judge James Shadid, who subsequently assumed senior status on September 27, 2024. On July 31, 2024, a hearing on his nomination was held before the Senate Judiciary Committee. On September 19, 2024, his nomination was reported out of committee by a 13–8 vote. Hawley was one of four people recommended for the vacancy by Senators Dick Durbin and Tammy Duckworth. On November 13, 2024, the United States Senate invoked cloture on his nomination by a 50–48 vote. His nomination was confirmed on the same day by a 50–46 vote. He received his judicial commission on November 15, 2024.

Legal offices
Preceded by James Shadid	Judge of the United States District Court for the Central District of Illinois; 2024–present	Incumbent
