= P. Scott Neville Jr. =

American judge (born 1948 or 1949)

Scott Neville

Chief Justice of the Illinois Supreme Court
- Incumbent
- Assumed office October 26, 2025
- Preceded by: Mary Jane Theis

Justice of the Illinois Supreme Court
- Incumbent
- Assumed office June 15, 2018
- Preceded by: Charles E. Freeman

Judge of the Illinois Appellate Court for the 1st district
- In office June 11, 2004 – June 15, 2018
- Preceded by: Neil Hartigan
- Succeeded by: Michael Hyman

Personal details
- Born: 1948 or 1949 (age 77–78) Chicago, Illinois, U.S.
- Party: Democratic
- Education: Culver-Stockton College (BA); Washington University in St. Louis (JD)

P. Scott Neville Jr. (born 1948 or 1949) is an American lawyer who has served as the chief justice of the Illinois Supreme Court since 2025, while also concurrently serving as a justice of the court since 2018.

== Education ==
Neville received his bachelor's degree in history from Culver–Stockton College in 1970 and his Juris Doctor from Washington University School of Law in 1973.

== Career ==
He was admitted to the bar in 1974 and served as a law clerk to appellate court Justice Glenn T. Johnson. From 1977 until 1979, he was Of Counsel at Howard, Mann & Slaughter. In 1979, he became a principal with the law firm of Neville & Ward. In 1981, he established P. Scott Neville, Jr. & Associates, which merged with Howse, Howse, Neville & Gray in 1990.

=== State judicial service ===
Neville was appointed to the Circuit Court of Cook County in 1999 and elected in 2000. On June 11, 2004, he was appointed to the Appellate Court to succeed Neil Hartigan. He was then elected to the Appellate Court in 2012. He also served as Chairman of the Executive Committee for the Illinois Appellate Court, First District from September 1, 2013, until August 31, 2014, is a former member of the Appellate Court's Executive Committee and has been the Presiding Justice of the Second, Third and Fourth Divisions.

=== Appointment to Illinois Supreme Court ===
Neville was appointed by the Supreme Court to fill the vacancy created by the retirement of Justice Charles E. Freeman. He was sworn into office on June 15, 2018 and his term would have ended on December 7, 2020, but he was subsequently elected in his own right in the 2020 Illinois judicial elections. Neville was only the second black justice in the Illinois Supreme Court's 170-year history (Freeman had been the first).

== Personal life ==
Neville was born in Chicago. He is married to Sharon J. Neville and has two adult stepdaughters.

== See also ==
- List of African-American jurists

Legal offices
Preceded by Charles E. Freeman	Justice of the Illinois Supreme Court; 2018–present	Incumbent
Preceded by Mary Jane Theis	Chief Justice of the Illinois Supreme Court; 2025–present	Incumbent
