= Michael M. Mihm =

American judge (born 1943)

Senior Judge of the United States District Court for the Central District of Illinois
- Incumbent
- Assumed office October 1, 2009

Chief Judge of the United States District Court for the Central District of Illinois
- In office 1991–1998
- Preceded by: Harold Baker
- Succeeded by: Joe Billy McDade

Judge of the United States District Court for the Central District of Illinois
- In office August 6, 1982 – October 1, 2009
- Appointed by: Ronald Reagan
- Preceded by: Robert Dale Morgan
- Succeeded by: James Shadid

Personal details
- Born: Michael Martin Mihm; 1943 (age 82–83) Amboy, Illinois, U.S.
- Education: Loras College (BA); Saint Louis University (JD)

Michael Martin Mihm (born 1943) is a senior United States district judge of the United States District Court for the Central District of Illinois, with chambers in Peoria, Illinois. In 2004, he received the USAID Outstanding Citizen Achievement Citation for his work with the Russian judicial system.

== Education and career ==
Mihm was born in 1943, in Amboy, Illinois, he grew up on a farm, and his mother was a school teacher. He graduated with a Bachelor of Arts degree from Loras College in 1964 and received a Juris Doctor from Saint Louis University School of Law in 1967.

Mihm was an assistant prosecuting attorney for St. Louis County, Missouri from 1967 to 1968; assistant state's attorney for Peoria County, Illinois from 1968 to 1969; and assistant corporation counsel for the City of Peoria from 1969 to 1972. He was State's Attorney of Peoria County from 1972 to 1980, then in private law practice in Peoria from 1980 until becoming a federal judge in 1982.

=== Federal judicial service ===
Mihm was nominated by President Ronald Reagan on July 27, 1982, to the seat vacated by Judge Robert Dale Morgan of the United States District Court for the Central District of Illinois. He was confirmed by the United States Senate on August 5, 1982, and received his commission on August 6, 1982. Mihm served as the district's chief judge from 1991 to 1998. He assumed senior status on October 1, 2009.

== Notable case ==
Mihm presided over the case of Ali Saleh Kahlah al-Marri, who pleaded guilty in 2009 to conspiring to provide material aid to Al Qaeda. Federal authorities arrested al-Marri in 2001 for credit card fraud, then deemed him an enemy combatant, and detained him without charge for over six years. The federal government claimed that al-Marri was an al Qaeda sleeper agent. The Court of Appeals for the Fourth Circuit ordered al-Marri brought before a civilian court in 2007, and in 2009, the United States dropped its appeal of that decision, and transferred al-Marri to Mihm's court.

Legal offices
Preceded by Robert Dale Morgan	Judge of the United States District Court for the Central District of Illinois; 1982–2009	Succeeded by James Shadid
Preceded by Harold Baker	Chief Judge of the United States District Court for the Central District of Illinois; 1991–1998	Succeeded by Joe Billy McDade
