= Dave Koehler =

American politician

David Koehler
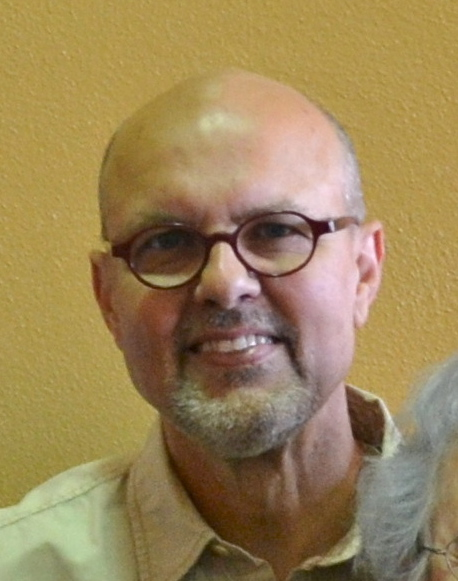

Member of the Illinois Senate from the 46th district
- Incumbent
- Assumed office December 3, 2006
- Preceded by: George Shadid

Personal details
- Born: December 16, 1948 (age 77)
- Party: Democratic
- Spouse: Nora Sullivan
- Children: 3
- Education: Yankton College (BA); United Theological Seminary (MDiv)
- Profession: Minister (retired)

David Koehler (born December 16, 1948) is a Democratic politician from Illinois, and has been the Illinois State Senator from 46th Legislative District since December 2006. The district includes parts of Peoria, Tazewell, Woodford, and McLean Counties.

== Biographical background ==
Koehler was born and raised in South Dakota. He graduated from Yankton College in South Dakota (Bachelor of Arts, 1971) and United Theological Seminary in Dayton, Ohio (Master of Divinity).

He was a staff member at the National Farm Worker Ministry (NFWM) from 1972 to 1978 working in Arizona, Ohio, New York, and eventually at the United Farm Workers La Paz headquarters in Keene, California.

He moved to Peoria, Illinois in 1978, and became a community organizer and manager for the Peoria Friendship House, a local charity. He became executive director of the Peoria Area Labor Management Council (PALM) in 1985, and president of its Labor Management Cooperative Health Programs in 1992.

His wife is Nora Sullivan. They live in Peoria, and started Peoria Bread Company, a bakery, in 2006.

Koehler is a retired minister in the United Church of Christ.

== Political career ==
Koehler was on the Peoria County Board from 1982 to 1988, and Peoria City Council from 1989 to 1997. While on the city council, he was mayor pro tem for two years.

Koehler was elected to the Illinois Senate in November 2006; his predecessor, George Shadid, retired in December 2006, allowing Koehler to take office in on December 3, 2006. He was re-elected uncontested in 2010.

In early 2010, Koehler and other lawmakers called for the elimination of the position of Illinois Lieutenant Governor. After candidate Scott Lee Cohen, the Democratic primary winner for Lieutenant Governor, dropped out, Koehler applied to be considered for that seat as running mate in Governor Pat Quinn's first election campaign after succeeding to the governorship. Sheila Simon was selected by the Democratic State Central Committee instead, and won the election.

During the 96th Illinois General Assembly, Koehler was the chair of the Local Government Committee and of the Subcommittee on Fertilizers and Chemicals (of the Agriculture and Conservation Committee). He is also Vice-Chair of the Energy Committee. In the 97th General Assembly, he was once again chair of the Local Government Committee and chair of vice-chair of the Energy Committee.

Saying he had a good team and was pleased by the results, Sen. Koehler defeated his Republican opponent for a second four-year term in the Nov. 2012 general election, Peoria-area businessman and developer Pat Sullivan, by a margin of 39,149 to 31,684 — or a 55 percent to 45 percent margin, with Tazewell County unable to provide complete results late Tuesday. His priorities are pension reform and tax code changes, civil unions, passing of concealed carry, and containing the budget and a backlog of unpaid bills.

Koehler was reelected to a fourth term in 2016. In 2018, J. B. Pritzker appointed Koehler to Powering Illinois’ Future transition committee, which is responsible for infrastructure and clean energy policies. He defeated Mary Burress in the 2020 general election, winning a fifth term in the Illinois State Senate.

In March 2022, Koehler served as the lead sponsor of House Bill 4089, which required Illinois school districts to provide plant-based lunch options compliant with federal nutrition mandates to students who submit a prior request to the district. Koehler stated the proposal's intention was to accommodate diverse religious, cultural, and health needs. In May 2022, Governor J.B. Pritzker signed the bill into law.

As of July 2022, Senator Koehler is a member of the following Illinois Senate committee:

- Agriculture Committee (SAGR)
- (Chairman of) Appropriations - Agriculture, Environment & Energy Committee (SAPP-SAAE)
- Appropriations - Health Committee (SAPP-SAHA)
- Appropriations Committee (SAPP)
- Education Committee (SESE)
- Energy and Public Utilities Committee (SENE)
- Health Committee (SHEA)
- Labor Committee (SLAB)
- (Co-chairman of) Labor - Special Issues Committee (SLAB-SLSI)
- Redistricting - East Central and Southeastern Illinois Committee (SRED-SRSE)
- Redistricting - Northern Illinois Committee (SRED-SRNI)
- (Chairman of) Redistricting - West Central Illinois Committee (SRED-SRWC)
- Subcommittee on Next Generation Nuclear (SENE-SNGN)
- Subcommittee on Managed Care Organizations (SHEA-SMCO)
- (Chairman of) Subcommittee on Public Health (SHEA-SHPH)

Illinois Senate 46th District election results 2006-2020
Year	Democrat	Votes	Pct	Republican	Votes	Pct
2006	Dave Koehler	32,873	58.61%	Ernie Russell	23,209	41.39%
2010	Dave Koehler	43,474	100%	no candidate		
2012	Dave Koehler	45,054	54.18%	Pat Sullivan	38,104	45.82%
2016	Dave Koehler	70,854	100%	no candidate		
2020	Dave Koehler	47,492	53.89%	Mary Burress	40,634	46.11%
2022	Dave Koehler	38,672	58.07%	Desi Anderson	27,924	41.93%
