= Clarence A. Darrow =

American politician and lawyer

Clarence Allison Darrow

Member of the Illinois Senate from the 36th district
- In office 1983–1987

Member of the Illinois House of Representatives from the 36th district
- In office 1975–1983

Personal details
- Born: March 22, 1940 (age 86) Dubuque, Iowa, U.S.
- Education: Loras College; University of Illinois; Chicago-Kent College of Law

Clarence Allison Darrow (born March 22, 1940) is an American politician and lawyer. He served in the Illinois House of Representatives and Illinois Senate.

Darrow was born in Dubuque, Iowa. He received his bachelor's degree from Loras College. Darrow received his masters's degree in social work from University of Illinois and his law degree from Chicago-Kent College of Law. He was admitted to the Illinois bar. Darrow lived in Rock Island, Illinois, with his wife and family and practiced law in Rock Island. He served as an assistant state's attorney for Rock Island County, Illinois from 1971 to 1974. Darrow served in the Illinois House of Representatives from 1975 to 1983 and in the Illinois Senate from 1983 to 1987. He was a Democrat. Darrow served as an Illinois Circuit Court judge. Darrow's son Clarence Michael Darrow serves as an Illinois Circuit Court judge and his daughter-in-law Sara Lynn Darrow serves as a United States District Court judge.
