= Richard Henry Mills =

American judge (1929–2023)

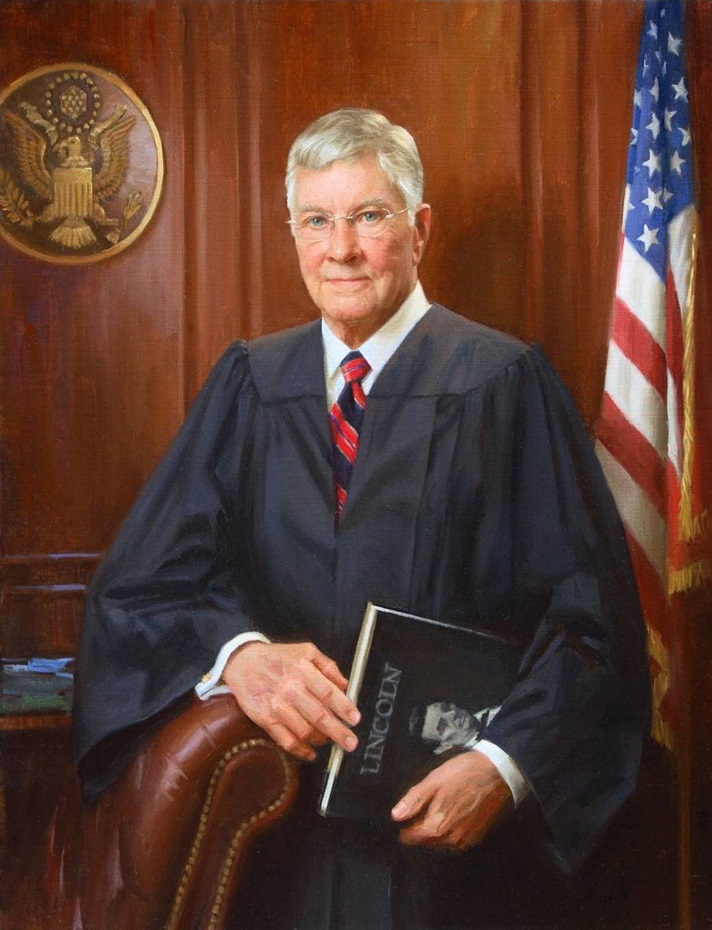

Senior Judge of the United States District Court for the Central District of Illinois
- In office October 7, 1997 – July 16, 2023

Judge of the United States District Court for the Central District of Illinois
- In office July 22, 1985 – October 7, 1997
- Appointed by: Ronald Reagan
- Preceded by: J. Waldo Ackerman
- Succeeded by: Jeanne E. Scott

Personal details
- Born: Richard Henry Mills; July 19, 1929 Beardstown, Illinois, U.S.
- Died: July 16, 2023 (aged 93) Springfield, Illinois, U.S.
- Education: Illinois College (BA); Mercer University (JD); University of Virginia (LLM)

Richard Henry Mills (July 19, 1929 – July 16, 2023) was a United States district judge of the United States District Court for the Central District of Illinois.

== Education and career ==
Born in Beardstown, Illinois, Mills received a Bachelor of Arts degree from Illinois College in 1951, and a Juris Doctor from Mercer University School of Law in 1957. He was in the United States Army Reserve, JAG Corps from 1952 to 1954, achieving the rank of colonel. He was in private practice in Virginia, Illinois from 1957 to 1966, and was a state's attorney of Cass County, Illinois from 1960 to 1964. He was a circuit judge of the Eighth Judicial Circuit of Illinois in Virginia from 1966 to 1976, and then a justice of the Appellate Court of Illinois, Fourth District in Springfield from 1976 to 1985. He received a Master of Laws from the University of Virginia School of Law in 1982.

=== Federal judicial service ===
On June 25, 1985, Mills was nominated by President Ronald Reagan to a seat on the United States District Court for the Central District of Illinois vacated by Judge J. Waldo Ackerman. Mills was confirmed by the United States Senate on July 19, 1985, and received his commission on July 22, 1985. He assumed senior status on October 7, 1997.

== Personal life and death ==
Mills died July 16, 2023.

== Sources ==
Legal offices
Preceded by J. Waldo Ackerman	Judge of the United States District Court for the Central District of Illinois; 1985–1997	Succeeded by Jeanne E. Scott
