= Colleen Lawless =

American judge (born 1983)

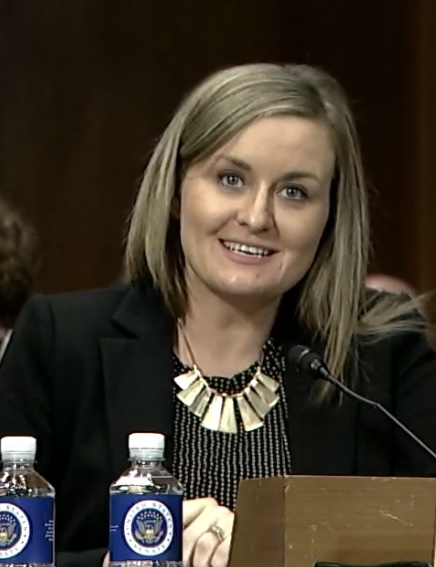

Judge of the United States District Court for the Central District of Illinois
- Incumbent
- Assumed office March 9, 2023
- Appointed by: Joe Biden
- Preceded by: Sue E. Myerscough

Associate Judge of the Illinois Circuit Court for the 7th district
- In office 2019 – March 9, 2023

Personal details
- Born: Colleen Rae Schuster; 1983 (age 42–43) Joliet, Illinois, U.S.
- Spouse: Ryan Lawless (m. 2010)
- Education: Illinois Wesleyan University (BA); Northern Illinois University (JD)

Colleen Rae Lawless (née Schuster; born 1983) is an American lawyer serving as a United States district judge of the United States District Court for the Central District of Illinois. She was associate judge of the Seventh Judicial Circuit in Sangamon County, Illinois from 2019 to 2023.

== Education ==
Lawless earned a Bachelor of Arts degree from Illinois Wesleyan University in 2005 and a Juris Doctor from the Northern Illinois University College of Law in 2009.

== Career ==
From 2009 to 2019, Lawless was a lawyer and shareholder at Londrigan, Potter & Randle P.C. in Springfield, Illinois. From 2019 to 2023, she served as an associate judge of the Illinois Circuit Court for the 7th district.

In 2011, Lawless represented Marvin Manns, an African American water maintenance worker who sued the city of Decatur for discrimination after he was terminated. Manns refused to sign an agreement that gave him a lower pay but allowed him to bypass civil service selection rules.

=== Federal judicial service ===
On September 2, 2022, President Joe Biden announced his intent to nominate Lawless to serve as a United States district judge of the United States District Court for the Central District of Illinois. On September 6, 2022, her nomination was sent to the Senate. President Biden nominated Lawless to the seat to be vacated by Judge Sue E. Myerscough, who announced her intent to assume senior status upon confirmation of a successor. On November 15, 2022, a hearing on her nomination was held before the Senate Judiciary Committee. On December 8, 2022, her nomination was reported out of committee by a 15–7 vote. On January 3, 2023, her nomination was returned to the President under Rule XXXI, Paragraph 6 of the United States Senate. She was renominated on January 23, 2023. On February 9, 2023, her nomination was reported out of committee by a 14–7 vote. On March 1, 2023, the Senate invoked cloture on her nomination by a 53–43 vote. On March 2, 2023, her nomination was confirmed by a 51–41 vote. She received her judicial commission on March 9, 2023.

==== Notable rulings ====
In July 2024, Lawless dismissed a federal lawsuit filed against the Springfield, Illinois, police department by the father of a deceased two-year-old girl. The man accused Springfield police officers of violating his constitutional rights and Illinois state law during a traffic stop where his daughter's ashes, contained in an urn, were tested for drugs.

Legal offices
Preceded by Sue E. Myerscough	Judge of the United States District Court for the Central District of Illinois; 2023–present	Incumbent
