= John C. Milhiser =

American attorney

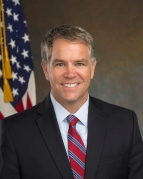

State's Attorney of Sangamon County
- Incumbent
- Assumed office November 14, 2023
- Preceded by: Dan Wright
- In office September 28, 2010 – October 30, 2018
- Preceded by: John Schmidt
- Succeeded by: Dan Wright

United States Attorney for the Central District of Illinois
- In office October 31, 2018 – February 28, 2021 (Acting: October 31, 2018 – January 2, 2019)
- President: Donald Trump; Joe Biden
- Preceded by: James A. Lewis
- Succeeded by: Gregory K. Harris

Personal details
- Born: 1969 or 1970 (age 56–57) United States
- Party: Republican
- Education: James Madison University (B.A.); University of Illinois (J.D.)

John C. Milhiser is an American attorney who serves as the Sangamon State's Attorney. He served as the United States Attorney for the United States District Court for the Central District of Illinois from 2018 to 2021. Prior to becoming a U.S. Attorney, Milhiser was previously the Sangamon County State's Attorney from 2010 to 2018. In January 2022, Milhiser announced he would seek the Republican nomination for Illinois Secretary of State in the 2022 election. He was reappointed Sangamon State's Attorney November 14, 2023.

== Education ==
Milhiser received his undergraduate degree from James Madison University and his Juris Doctor from the University of Illinois College of Law.

== Legal career ==
He started his legal career in the Sangamon County State's Attorney's office in 1997 and spent time in the juvenile, civil, and felony divisions before entering private practice in 2003. He returned to the State's Attorney's Office in 2008 as the First Assistant State's Attorney. Milhiser served as adjunct professor at Springfield College in Illinois/Benedictine University from 2004 to 2009. He taught courses in public speaking, state and local government, and federal government. He served as the president of the Illinois State's Attorneys Association.

The Illinois Supreme Court appointed then-Sangamon County State's Attorney John Schmidt to a judgeship in Illinois's 7th Circuit Court. On September 28, 2010, Milhiser was chosen by the Sangamon County Board to serve as the new State's Attorney until the 2012 general election. Milhiser, endorsed by the Sangamon County Republican Party, defeated Ron Tupy, longtime chief legal counsel for the Illinois Prisoner Review Board by a three-to-one margin in the 2012 Republican primary and defeated Democratic candidate and labor attorney Ron Stradt in the general election. As the State's Attorney, he tried serious felony cases, including first degree murder, armed violence, attempted murder of a police officer, and sexual assault cases. Dan Wright was appointed his successor as State's Attorney and sworn into office on October 30, 2018.

On November 14, 2023, John Milhiser was sworn in as Sangamon County State's Attorney for a second time after receiving unanimous approval from the Sangamon County Board.

In the November 2024 election, Milhiser was re-elected, defeating trial attorney Kimberly Talken.

== U.S. Attorney for the Central District of Illinois ==
On August 16, 2018, President Donald Trump announced his intent to nominate Milhiser to be the U.S. Attorney for the Central District of Illinois. On August 21, 2018, his nomination was sent to the United States Senate. On January 2, 2019, his nomination was confirmed by voice vote.

On February 8, 2021, he along with 55 other Trump-era attorneys were asked to resign. On February 11, 2021, Milhiser submitted his resignation, effective February 28, 2021.

== 2022 Illinois Secretary of State Election ==
During the 2022 elections, Milhiser sought the Republican nomination for Illinois Secretary of State to succeed Jesse White, who announced his retirement after 6 terms in office. Milhiser faced State Representative Dan Brady of Bloomington. Brady defeated Milhiser by a 3 to 1 margin, with Milhiser only winning Sangamon County and Brady winning the state's other 101 counties.

Results by county Brady: 50–60%; 60–70%; 70–80%; 80–90%; Milhiser: 60–70%

Republican primary results
Party	Candidate	Votes	%
Republican	Dan Brady	550,700	76.36%
Republican	John C. Milhiser	170,496	23.64%
Total votes		721,196	100.0%

== Personal life ==
He and his wife Gail live in Springfield with their two daughters, Abby and Katie Mae.
