= Colin S. Bruce =

American judge (born 1965)

Colin Bruce
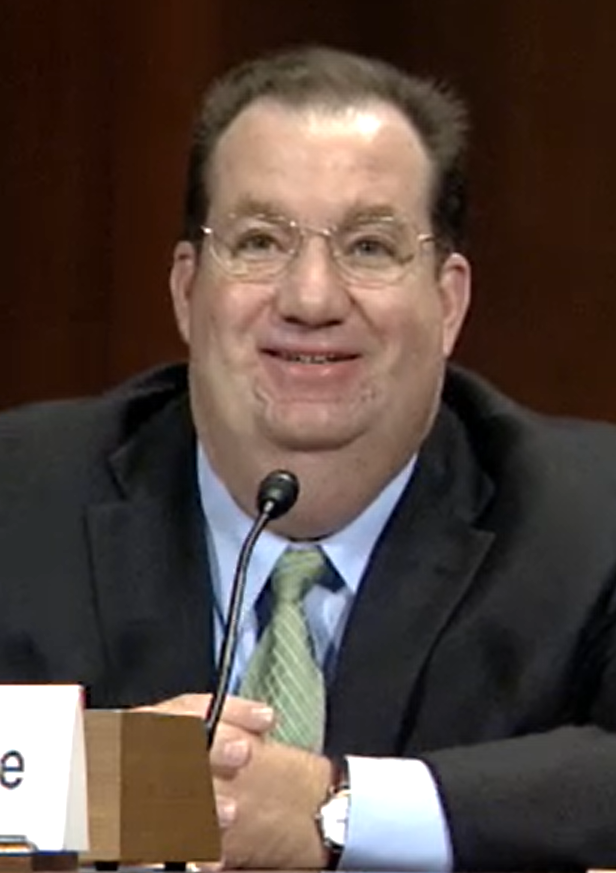

Chief Judge of the United States District Court for the Central District of Illinois
- Incumbent
- Assumed office March 12, 2026
- Preceded by: Sara Darrow

Judge of the United States District Court for the Central District of Illinois
- Incumbent
- Assumed office October 8, 2013
- Appointed by: Barack Obama
- Preceded by: Michael P. McCuskey

Personal details
- Born: Colin Stirling Bruce; September 17, 1965 (age 60) Urbana, Illinois, U.S.
- Education: University of Illinois, Urbana-Champaign (BA, JD)

Colin Stirling Bruce (born September 17, 1965) is the chief United States district judge of the United States District Court for the Central District of Illinois.

== Biography ==
Bruce was born in 1965 in Urbana, Illinois. He received a Bachelor of Arts degree in 1986 from the University of Illinois at Urbana-Champaign. He received his Juris Doctor in 1989 from the University of Illinois College of Law. He joined the United States Attorney's Office in 1989 and has spent his entire career as an Assistant United States Attorney, prior to his appointment to the bench in 2013. In this time, he prosecuted a broad range of federal criminal cases, including large drug conspiracies, complex frauds, and cybercrimes. He also handled civil matters on behalf of the United States. Bruce was First Assistant United States Attorney from 2010 to 2013, supervising all federal criminal investigations, prosecutions and appeals taking place within the Central District of Illinois.

== Federal judicial service ==
On May 6, 2013, President Barack Obama nominated Bruce to be a United States District Judge of the United States District Court for the Central District of Illinois, to the seat vacated by Judge Michael Patrick McCuskey, who assumed senior status on June 30, 2013. He received a hearing before the Senate Judiciary Committee on June 19, 2013, and his nomination was reported to the floor of the Senate on July 18, 2013, by a voice vote. The Senate confirmed his nomination on October 7, 2013 by a 96–0 vote. He received his commission on October 8, 2013. He became the chief judge on March 12, 2026.

Legal offices
Preceded by Michael P. McCuskey	Judge of the United States District Court for the Central District of Illinois; 2013–present	Incumbent
Preceded by Sara Darrow	Chief Judge of the United States District Court for the Central District of Illinois; 2026–present	Incumbent
