= Jeanne E. Scott =

American judge (1948–2019)

Judge of the United States District Court for the Central District of Illinois
- In office October 22, 1998 – August 1, 2010
- Appointed by: Bill Clinton
- Preceded by: Richard Henry Mills
- Succeeded by: Sue E. Myerscough

Personal details
- Born: August 17, 1948 Springfield, Illinois, U.S.
- Died: October 19, 2019 (aged 71) Bloomington, Illinois, U.S.
- Education: Bradley University (BA); Northwestern University (JD)

Jeanne Ellen Scott (August 17, 1948 — October 19, 2019) was a former United States district judge of the United States District Court for the Central District of Illinois.

== Education and career ==
Scott was born in Springfield, Illinois. She received a Bachelor of Arts degree from Bradley University in 1970 and a Juris Doctor from Northwestern University School of Law in 1973. She was an assistant state's attorney for the Sangamon County State's Attorney's Office in Illinois from 1973 to 1978. She was in private practice from 1978 to 1979 and became an associate circuit judge for the Illinois Seventh Judicial Circuit from 1979 to 1988, and a circuit judge for Illinois Seventh Judicial Circuit from 1988 to 1998.

=== Federal judicial service ===
Scott was a United States District Judge of the United States District Court for the Central District of Illinois. Scott was nominated by President Bill Clinton on April 2, 1998, to a seat vacated by Judge Richard Henry Mills. She was confirmed by the United States Senate on October 21, 1998, and received her commission on October 22, 1998. She resigned on August 1, 2010.

== Post judicial career and death ==
After her resignation, she was an attorney in private practice in Springfield. Scott died on October 19, 2019, aged 71.

== Sources ==
Legal offices
Preceded by Richard Henry Mills	Judge of the United States District Court for the Central District of Illinois; 1998–2010	Succeeded by Sue E. Myerscough
