= Mary Jane Theis =

American judge (born 1949)

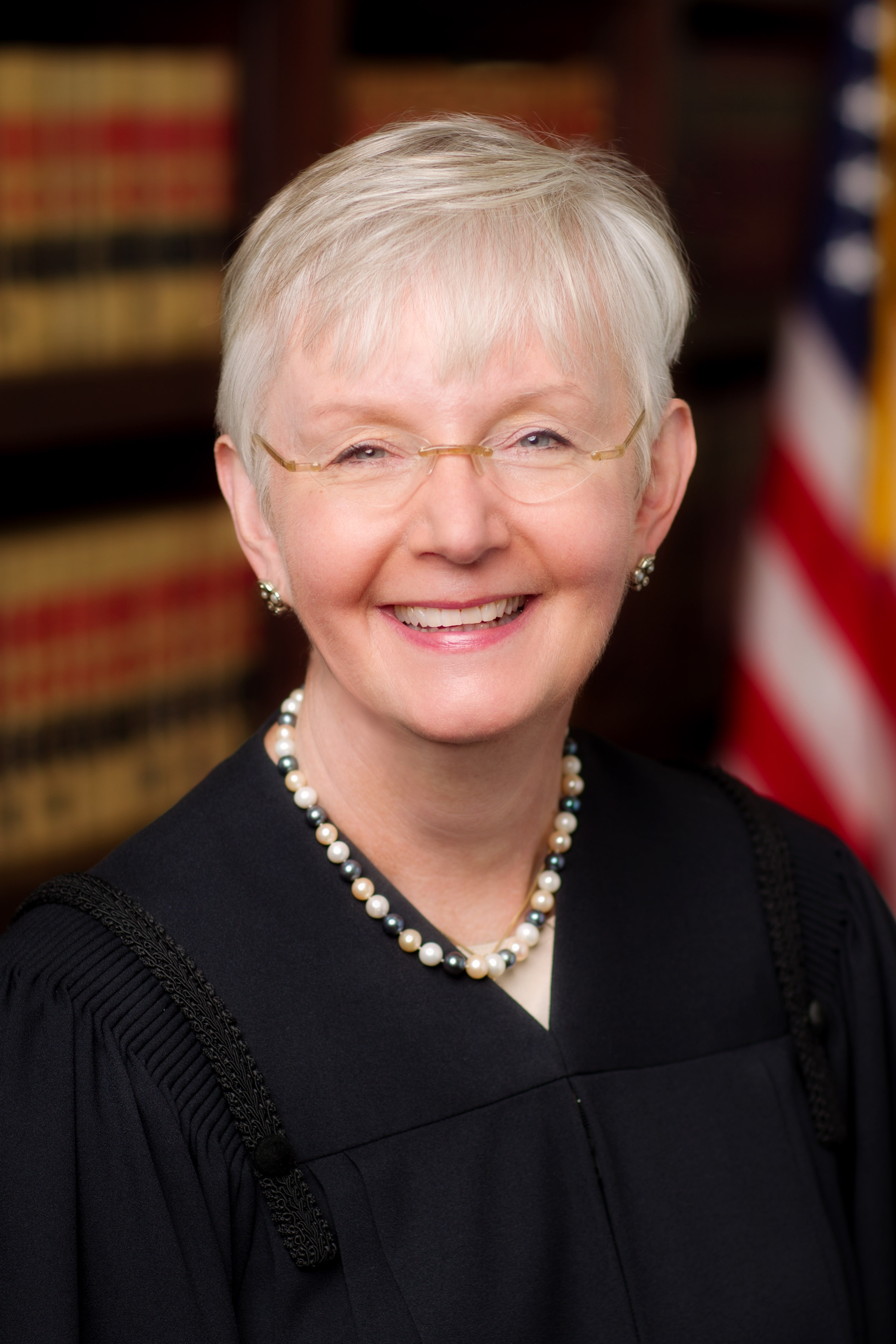

Chief Justice of the Illinois Supreme Court
- In office October 26, 2022 – October 26, 2025
- Preceded by: Anne M. Burke
- Succeeded by: P. Scott Neville Jr.

Justice of the Illinois Supreme Court
- In office October 26, 2010 – January 29, 2026
- Preceded by: Thomas Fitzgerald
- Succeeded by: Sanjay Tailor

Personal details
- Born: Mary Jane Wendt; February 27, 1949 (age 77) Chicago, Illinois, U.S.
- Party: Democratic
- Spouse: John Theis
- Relatives: Ken Wendt (father)
- Education: Loyola University Chicago (BA); University of San Francisco (JD)

Mary Jane Theis (born February 27, 1949) is a former justice of the Illinois Supreme Court for the First Judicial District in Cook County. In 2022, she became chief justice after the retirement of then-chief justice Anne M. Burke. Theis announced on January 12th, 2026, that she would resign from the Illinois Supreme Court effective January 29, 2026.

== Early life ==
She was born Mary Jane Wendt in Chicago to Eleanore and Kenneth Wendt, a member of the Illinois General Assembly and a longtime judge in Cook County. She is a member of the Democratic Party.

She received her bachelor's degree from Loyola University Chicago and her Juris Doctor from the University of San Francisco School of Law.

== Career ==
Theis was assistant public defender in Cook County from 1974 to 1983.

=== Judicial career ===
Theis became a judge in 1983, serving as an associate judge in the Cook County Circuit Court from 1983 to 1988, a full judge in the circuit court from 1988 to 1994, and state appellate court judge from 1993 to 2010. From December 1997 until December 1998, Theis additionally served as president of the Illinois Judges Association.

In 2010, Theis was appointed by the Illinois Supreme Court to fill a vacancy on its bench, taking office October 26, 2010. She won a full term in a partisan election in 2012. In the general election, Chicago Tribune endorsed her for election to a full term, citing her "universally accepted expertise on judicial ethics, family law, sentencing, fairness." She previously served as chair for the Illinois Judicial Conference's Committees on Education and Judicial Conduct, as well as on the Illinois Supreme Court's rules committee. In September 2022, she was named chief justice after the retirement of then-chief justice Anne M. Burke, effective October 26, 2022.

=== Academic career ===
Theis has taught at law schools in Chicago (Loyola University School of Law, Northwestern University School of Law, and the John Marshall Law School) and at Illinois and Chicago bar association conferences and seminars.

== Honors and awards ==
Awards which Theis has received include a Lifetime Achievement Award from the Illinois Judges Association, the Mary Heftel Hooten Award from the Women's Bar Association of Illinois, and the Access to Justice Award from the Illinois State Bar Association.

== Personal life ==
Theis is married to John T. Theis, and they have two children and seven grandchildren.

Legal offices
Preceded by Thomas Fitzgerald	Justice of the Illinois Supreme Court; 2010–2026	Succeeded by Sanjay Tailor
Preceded by Anne M. Burke	Chief Justice of the Illinois Supreme Court; 2022–2025	Succeeded by P. Scott Neville Jr.
