= United States Post Office and Courthouse (Peoria, Illinois) =

- U.S. Post Office and Courthouse
- U.S. National Register of Historic Places
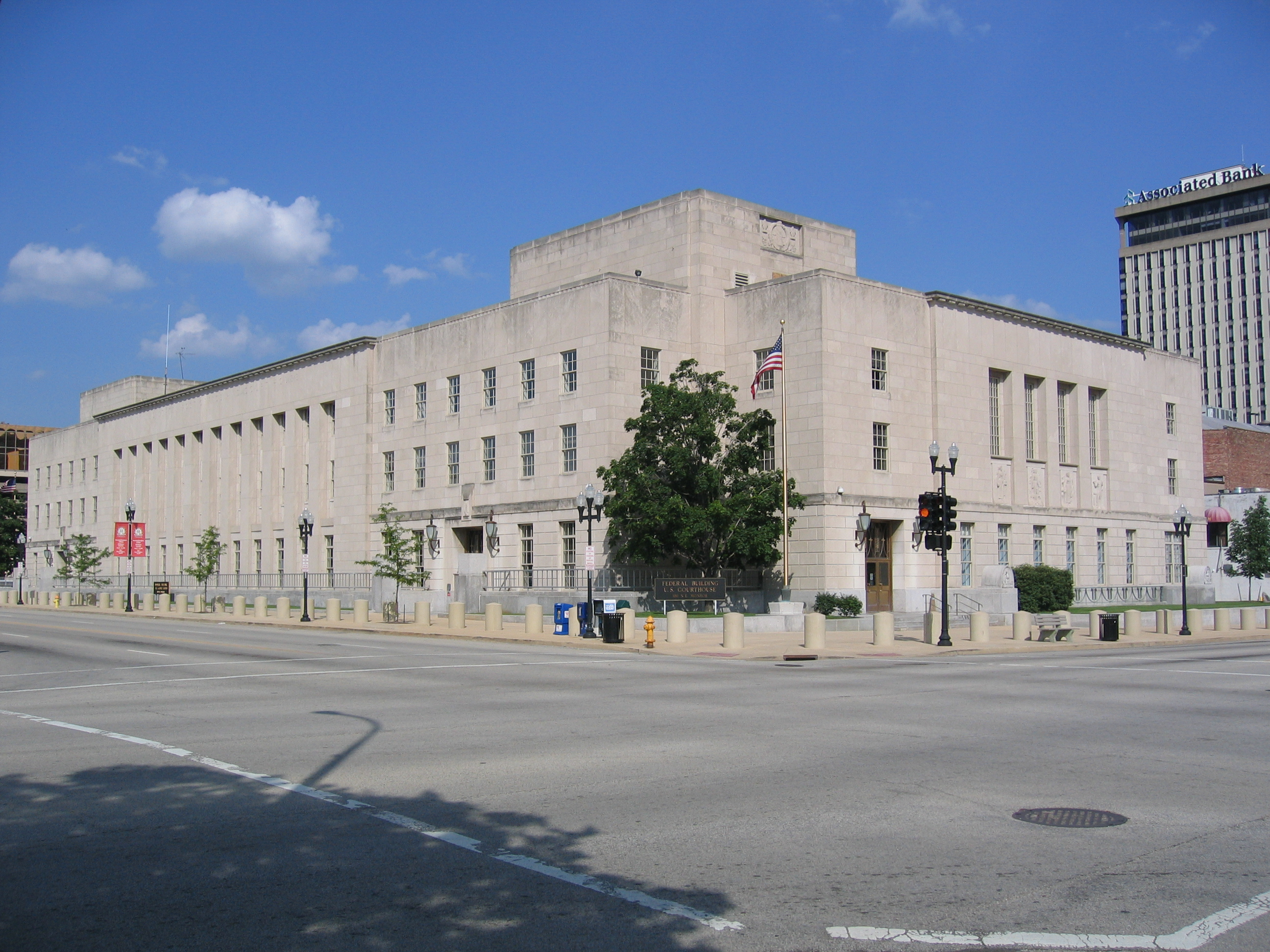

- Location within Peoria County, Illinois
- Location: 100 NE. Monroe St., Peoria, Illinois
- Coordinates: 40°41′42″N 89°35′30″W
- Built: 1937-1938
- Architect: Howard Lovewell Cheney, Louis A. Simon
- Architectural style: Moderne
- NRHP reference No.: 12000878
- Added to NRHP: October 24, 2012

The U.S. Post Office and Courthouse, located at 100 Northeast Monroe Street in Peoria, Illinois, is a U.S. district courthouse for the Central District of Illinois. The building was constructed in 1937–38; it has a PWA Moderne design, a variant of Moderne architecture commonly used in Public Works Administration projects. Louis A. Simon, the Supervising Architect at the time, provided the plans for the building, while Howard Lovewell Cheney was the architect of record. The courthouse has a monumental granite exterior with limestone decorations; these decorations include bas-relief panels sculpted by Freeman L. Schoolcraft above its Main Street entrance: a man of industry, a woman of agriculture, a Native American, and a postal worker. The building's interior features painted ceilings, St. Genevieve marble walls, and patterned terrazzo floors. In addition to serving as a federal courthouse, the building also housed Peoria's main post office until 1981.

The courthouse was added to the National Register of Historic Places on October 24, 2012.
