= Thomas R. Chiola =

Illinois circuit judge (born 1952)

Judge of the Circuit Court of Cook County from the 8th Subcircuit
- In office 1994–2009
- Succeeded by: Celia G. Gamrath

Personal details
- Born: March 18, 1952 (age 74)
- Education: Illinois State University (BS); University of Illinois (JD)

Thomas R. Chiola (born March 18, 1952) served as a judge of the Illinois Circuit Court of Cook County from 1994 to 2009. He was the first openly gay person elected to public office in Illinois.

== Early life and education ==
Chiola grew up in Springfield, Illinois. He graduated from Springfield's Griffin High School (now Sacred Heart-Griffin High School) in 1970. Chiola then received a Bachelor of Science from Illinois State University in 1974 and a Juris Doctor from the University of Illinois College of Law in 1977. He served as an administrative law judge. He also served as general counsel of the Illinois Department of Professional Regulation.

== Judicial service ==
In 1994, Chiola was elected to the Illinois Circuit Court of Cook County. Chiola was the first openly gay candidate elected to any federal, state, county or municipal office in Illinois.

== Honors ==
In 1997, Chiola was inducted into the Chicago Gay and Lesbian Hall of Fame.

== See also ==
- List of first minority male lawyers and judges in Illinois
- List of LGBT jurists in the United States
