= Sara Darrow =

American judge (born 1970)

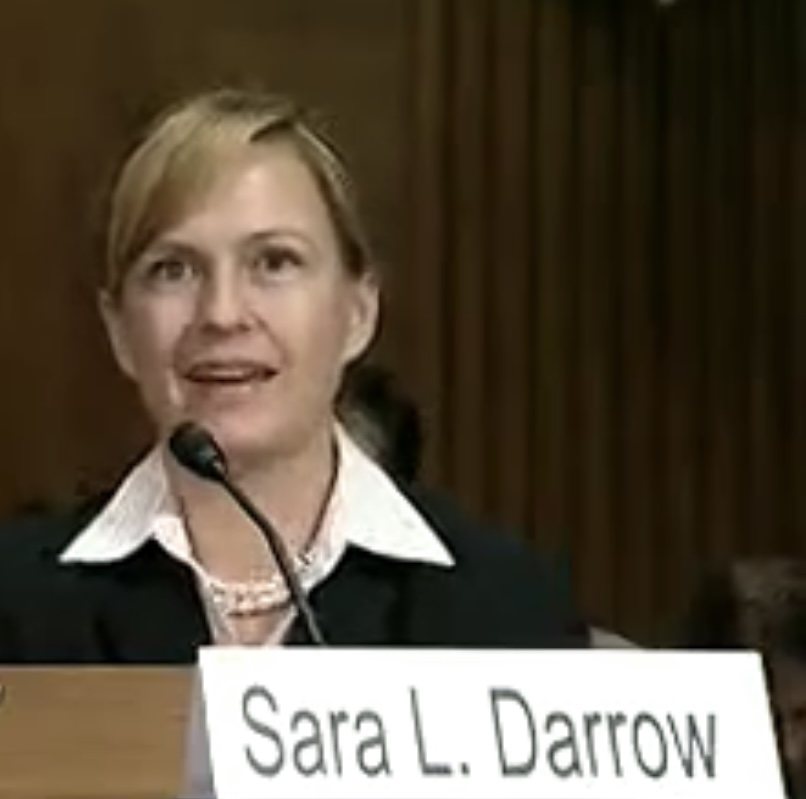

Chief Judge of the United States District Court for the Central District of Illinois
- In office March 12, 2019 – March 12, 2026
- Preceded by: James Shadid
- Succeeded by: Colin S. Bruce

Judge of the United States District Court for the Central District of Illinois
- Incumbent
- Assumed office August 3, 2011
- Appointed by: Barack Obama
- Preceded by: Joe Billy McDade

Personal details
- Born: Sara Lynn Frizzell; 1970 (age 55–56) Pontiac, Michigan, U.S.
- Spouse: Clarence Darrow
- Relatives: Clarence A. Darrow (father-in-law)
- Education: Marquette University (BA); Saint Louis University (JD)

Sara Lynn Darrow (née Frizzell; born 1970) is a United States district judge of the United States District Court for the Central District of Illinois. She was formerly an assistant United States attorney in the United States District Court for the Central District of Illinois, where she was chief of the violent crimes section.

== Early life and education ==
Darrow earned her Bachelor of Arts in 1992 from Marquette University and her Juris Doctor from Saint Louis University School of Law in 1997.

== Career ==
After graduating from law school, Darrow worked in the law offices of Clarence Darrow in Rock Island, Illinois. Between 1999 and 2003, she worked in the Henry County, Illinois State's Attorney's Office in Cambridge, Illinois. In 2003 Darrow became an assistant United States attorney for the Central District of Illinois, where she prosecuted significant criminal cases, involving firearms, drugs, gangs, fraud, money laundering, and corruption.

=== Federal judicial service ===
On the recommendation of Senator Dick Durbin, Darrow was nominated to the United States District Court for the Central District of Illinois by President Barack Obama on November 17, 2010 to fill a vacancy created by Judge Joe Billy McDade, who assumed senior status. The United States Senate confirmed Darrow by unanimous consent on August 2, 2011, and she received her commission the next day. She started her term as chief judge on March 12, 2019, which ended on March 12, 2026.

== Personal life ==
Darrow's husband Clarence Michael Darrow serves as an Illinois Circuit Court judge. Her father-in-law Clarence A. Darrow also served as an Illinois state court judge and served in the Illinois General Assembly.

Legal offices
Preceded by Joe Billy McDade	Judge of the United States District Court for the Central District of Illinois; 2011–present	Incumbent
Preceded by James Shadid	Chief Judge of the United States District Court for the Central District of Illinois; 2019–2026	Succeeded by Colin S. Bruce
