= Joe Billy McDade =

American judge (born 1937)

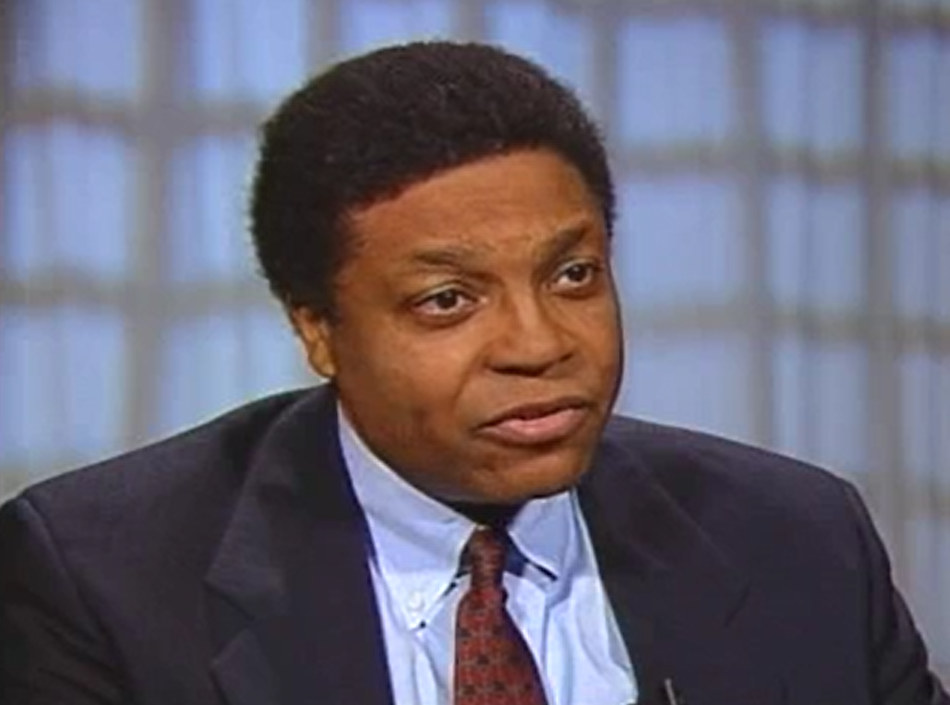
- Joe Billy McDade in 1991

Senior Judge of the United States District Court for the Central District of Illinois
- Incumbent
- Assumed office February 28, 2010

Chief Judge of the United States District Court for the Central District of Illinois
- In office 1998–2004
- Preceded by: Michael M. Mihm
- Succeeded by: Michael P. McCuskey

Judge of the United States District Court for the Central District of Illinois
- In office November 25, 1991 – February 28, 2010
- Appointed by: George H. W. Bush
- Preceded by: Seat established by 104 Stat. 5089
- Succeeded by: Sara Darrow

Personal details
- Born: Joe Billy McDade; 1937 (age 88–89) Bellville, Texas
- Party: Republican
- Education: Bradley University (BS, MS); University of Michigan (JD)

Joe Billy McDade (born 1937) is a senior United States district judge of the United States District Court for the Central District of Illinois, with chambers in Peoria, Illinois. He is the first judge of the newly created seat, and was appointed by President George H. W. Bush.

== Education and career ==
McDade was born in Bellville, Texas. He received a Bachelor of Science degree in economics, with honors, in 1959, and a Master of Science in psychology in 1960, both from Bradley University. While at Bradley, McDade was part of the All-NIT Basketball Team in 1957 and 1959 as a member of the Bradley University NIT Championship team. He earned a Juris Doctor from the University of Michigan Law School in 1963.

McDade was a staff attorney in the United States Department of Justice Antitrust Division in Chicago from 1963 to 1965. He was an executive trainee at the First Federal Savings and Loan Association of Peoria, Illinois in 1965. He was executive director of the Greater Peoria Legal Aid Society from 1965 to 1968. He was in private practice in Peoria from 1968 to 1982: first as a partner in Hafele & McDade, P.C., until 1977, then in solo practice until his election as a state judge in 1982.

== Judicial service ==
=== State judicial service ===
He was an associate circuit judge of the Tenth Judicial Circuit of Illinois from 1982 to 1988. In the 1988 election, McDade ran to fill the vacancy left by Stephen J. Covey. McDade defeated Democratic candidate Frank E. Hoffman with 79,887 votes to Hoffman's 54,508 votes, and winning four of the five counties in the Tenth Judicial Circuit. He then served as a circuit judge of the Tenth Judicial Circuit of Illinois from 1988 to 1991. After McDade's confirmation to the federal bench, the Illinois Supreme Court appointed retired Judge James M. Bumgarner of Hennepin as circuit judge effective March 19, 1992, to December 7, 1992.

=== Federal judicial service ===
McDade was nominated by President George H. W. Bush on September 11, 1991, to the United States District Court for the Central District of Illinois, to a new "temporary" seat created by the Federal Judgeship Act of 1990, part of the Judicial Improvements Act of 1990 (Pub. L. 101–650, 104 Stat. 5089, enacted December 1, 1990); he was confirmed by the United States Senate on November 21, 1991, and received his commission on November 25, 1991. He served as chief judge from 1998 to 2004. McDade assumed senior status on February 28, 2010. As of December 2025, McDade appears to be inactive. He has been a member of the Illinois State Bar Association General Assembly.

== Personal life ==
McDade's first wife, Mary, is also a judge: she has been a justice of the Illinois Appellate Court since December 2000. They have four children.

== See also ==
- List of African-American federal judges
- List of African-American jurists
- List of first minority male lawyers and judges in Illinois

== Sources ==
Legal offices
Preceded by Seat established by 104 Stat. 5089	Judge of the United States District Court for the Central District of Illinois; 1991–2010	Succeeded by Sara Darrow
Preceded by Michael M. Mihm	Chief Judge of the United States District Court for the Central District of Illinois; 1998–2004	Succeeded by Michael P. McCuskey
