= Harold Baker (judge) =

American judge (1929–2023)

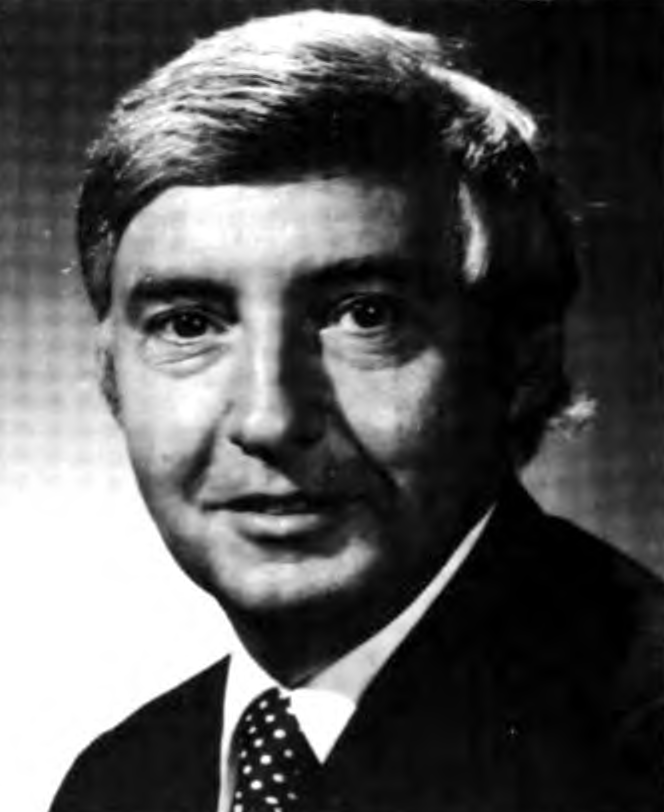

Judge of the United States Foreign Intelligence Surveillance Court
- In office May 18, 1998 – May 18, 2005
- Appointed by: William Rehnquist
- Preceded by: Charles Schwartz Jr.
- Succeeded by: Malcolm Jones Howard

Senior Judge of the United States District Court for the Central District of Illinois
- In office October 4, 1994 – January 2, 2022

Chief Judge of the United States District Court for the Central District of Illinois
- In office 1984–1991
- Preceded by: J. Waldo Ackerman
- Succeeded by: Michael M. Mihm

Judge of the United States District Court for the Central District of Illinois
- In office March 31, 1979 – October 4, 1994
- Appointed by: operation of law
- Preceded by: Seat established
- Succeeded by: Michael P. McCuskey

Judge of the United States District Court for the Eastern District of Illinois
- In office September 23, 1978 – March 31, 1979
- Appointed by: Jimmy Carter
- Preceded by: Henry Seiler Wise
- Succeeded by: Seat abolished

Personal details
- Born: Harold Albert Baker; October 4, 1929 Mt. Kisco, New York, U.S.
- Died: September 18, 2023 (aged 93) Champaign, Illinois, U.S.
- Education: Columbia University; University of Illinois at Urbana–Champaign (AB, JD)

Harold Albert Baker (October 4, 1929 – September 18, 2023) was a United States district judge of the United States District Court for the Central District of Illinois. He was originally appointed to the United States District Court for the Eastern District of Illinois in 1978 by Jimmy Carter and then reassigned to the newly created Central District in 1979. He became a senior judge in 1994. He was also a judge of the United States Foreign Intelligence Surveillance Court until 2005.

== Education and career ==
Baker attended Columbia University, then received an Artium Baccalaureus degree from the University of Illinois at Urbana–Champaign in 1951. He was in the United States Navy from 1951 to 1953, obtaining the rank of Lieutenant. He received a Juris Doctor from University of Illinois College of Law in 1956. He was in private practice of law in Champaign, Illinois, from 1956 to 1978, and was an adjunct faculty member of the University of Illinois College of Law from 1972 to 1978. He was senior counsel for the United States President's Commission on CIA activities within the United States in 1975.

== Federal judicial service ==
Baker was nominated by President Jimmy Carter on August 9, 1978, to a seat vacated by Judge Henry Seiler Wise on the United States District Court for the Eastern District of Illinois. Baker was confirmed by the United States Senate on September 22, 1978, and received his commission on September 23, 1978. In 1978, the Eastern District and Southern District of Illinois were rearranged into the Southern District and Central District of Illinois. Baker was reassigned to the United States District Court for the Central District of Illinois on March 31, 1979, by operation of law. In the Central District he served as Chief Judge from 1984 to 1991, and assumed senior status on October 4, 1994. Baker was on the United States Foreign Intelligence Surveillance Court from May 18, 1995 to May 18, 2005, having been appointed by Chief Justice William Rehnquist. FISC judges serve seven-year terms.

== Personal life ==
Baker was born on October 4, 1929, in Mt. Kisco, New York. He died in Champaign, Illinois, on September 18, 2023, at the age of 93.

Legal offices
Preceded by Henry Seiler Wise	Judge of the United States District Court for the Eastern District of Illinois; 1978–1979	Succeeded by Seat abolished
Preceded by Seat established	Judge of the United States District Court for the Central District of Illinois; 1979–1994	Succeeded by Michael P. McCuskey
Preceded by J. Waldo Ackerman	Chief Judge of the United States District Court for the Central District of Illinois; 1984–1991	Succeeded by Michael M. Mihm
