= George Shadid =

American politician (1929–2018)

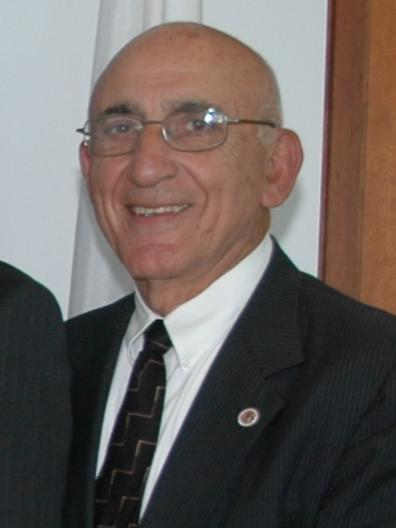
- Shadid in 2009

Member of the Illinois Senate from the 46th district
- In office May 1993 – December 2006
- Preceded by: Richard Luft
- Succeeded by: Dave Koehler

Peoria County Sheriff
- In office December 1976 – May 1993
- Preceded by: Bernard J. Kennedy
- Succeeded by: Al Misener

Personal details
- Born: May 15, 1929 Clinton, Iowa
- Died: February 3, 2018 (aged 88) Peoria, Illinois
- Party: Democratic
- Spouse: Lorraine K. (Unes) Shadid
- Children: 2

George P. Shadid (May 15, 1929 – February 3, 2018) was an American Democratic politician. He was sheriff of Peoria County, Illinois from 1976 to 1993 and was in the Illinois State Senate from 1993 until 2006.

== Background ==
Shadid was born in Clinton, Iowa to Edna Massad Shadid (Arabic: إدنا ماساد شاديد) and Philip A. Shadid (Arabic: فيليب شاديد), who immigrated from what is now Lebanon. At age 14, once in Peoria, Illinois, Shadid worked with future mayor Jim Maloof at the Maloof family cleaning business. They remained friends until Maloof's death.

== Career ==
Shadid became a police officer in 1953. In 1976, he ran for sheriff of Peoria County. Running as a Democrat, with a Republican campaign manager, he became the first Democrat elected as Peoria County sheriff since 1892. He took up the office of sheriff in December 1976. The 1985 jail and sheriff's complex on Maxwell Road was built during his tenure.

By 1993, Shadid was living near Edwards. In 1993, the Illinois State Senate 46th Senate District seat was vacated by Richard Luft of Pekin when Luft was appointed Illinois Commissioner of Banks and Trusts. Shadid was unanimously chosen as a replacement by Democratic leaders of the district, and was appointed to the Illinois State Senate on May 13, 1993. Al Meisner was appointed to replace Shadid as sheriff.

Shadid retired from the Senate in December 2006 to allow his elected successor, Democrat David Koehler, to take office earlier.

== Personal life and death ==
George Shadid had two sons. James E. "Jim" Shadid, is a federal judge. George Shadid Jr., died in 2005.

In 2013, Shadid donated his remaining campaign funds to Bradley University. In November 2014, the Peoria County jail complex on Maxwell Road was named the George P. Shadid Law Enforcement Center.

George Shadid died age 88 on February 3, 2018, of natural causes in Peoria.
