= James A. Lewis (attorney) =

American lawyer

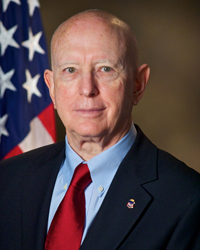

United States Attorney for the Central District of Illinois
- In office June 24, 2010 – December 24, 2016
- President: Barack Obama
- Preceded by: Jeffrey B. Lang (acting)
- Succeeded by: John C. Milhiser

Personal details
- Born: 1940 (age 85–86) New York City, New York, U.S.
- Party: Democratic
- Education: Yale University; University of Chicago Law School; Duke University School of Law LL.M.

James A. Lewis (born 1940) is an American attorney who served as the United States Attorney for the Central District of Illinois from 2010 to 2016. He graduated from Yale University in 1962, the University of Chicago Law School in 1966. Lewis earned Master of Laws degree from Duke University School of Law in 1975.

He was an Assistant United States Attorney in Springfield, Illinois, from 1983 to 2010. He worked as an adjunct professor at the University of Illinois Springfield in 1986, 1988 and 1990. Also was an adjunct professor at American University Washington College of Law in Washington, D.C., in 1979. Lewis was the Director of Clinical Education and an assistant professor at the North Carolina Central University School of Law, from 1976 until 1977. From 1974 until 1976, he was the Director of Clinical Education, this time at the Duke University School of Law. In 1974, he was a trial attorney for the Durham Legal Aid Office. From 1972 until 1973, he was a founding attorney for the Mississippi Prison Project. From 1970 until 1971, he was Executive Director of the North Mississippi Rural Legal Services where he had been on the Board of Directors. Prior to that, from 1969 until 1970, he served as general counsel to the Board of Directors for the American Civil Liberties Union of Mississippi. In 1969, he was an adjunct professor at Tougaloo College, and from 1966 until 1970, he had been a staff attorney for the Lawyers Constitutional Defense Committee.
