= Gregory K. Harris =

American lawyer (born 1948)

Gregory Harris
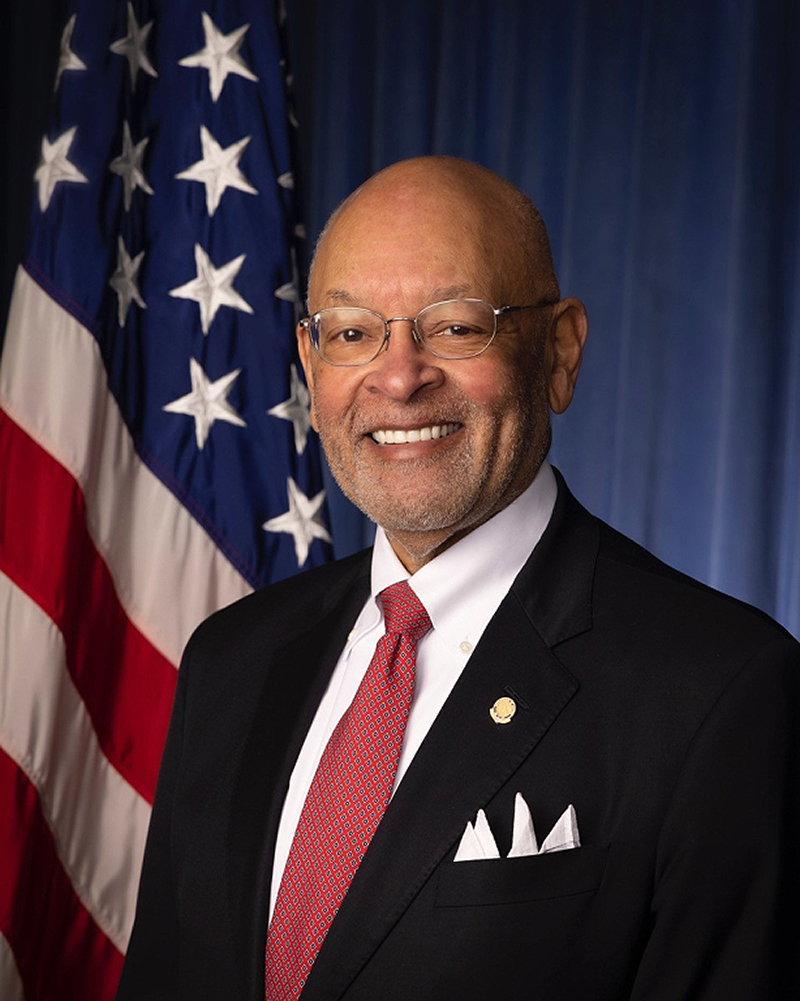

United States Attorney for the Central District of Illinois
- In office December 13, 2021 – January 2, 2025
- President: Joe Biden
- Preceded by: John C. Milhiser
- Succeeded by: Gregory M. Gilmore (acting)

Personal details
- Born: Gregory Keith Harris; 1948 (age 77–78) Washington, D.C., U.S.
- Education: Howard University (BA); University of Illinois Chicago (JD)

Gregory Keith Harris (born 1948) is an American lawyer who served as the United States attorney for the Central District of Illinois from 2021 to 2025.

== Early life and education ==
Harris was born in Washington, D.C. He earned a Bachelor of Arts degree from Howard University in 1971 and a Juris Doctor from the University of Illinois Chicago School of Law in 1976.

== Career ==
Harris began his career as a lawyer for the Office of the State Appellate Defender in 1976 where he represented indigent criminal defendants on appeal. From 1979 to 1980, he served as legal counsel for the Illinois Governor's Office of Manpower and Human Development and later as a staff attorney for the Illinois Department of Commerce and Community Development. From 1980 to 1988, he served as an assistant United States attorney in the United States Attorney's Office for the Central District of Illinois. From 1988 to 2001, he was a lawyer for Giffin, Winning, Cohen & Bodewes in Springfield, Illinois. He became an equity partner of the firm in 1992. He later rejoined the Central District of Illinois in 2001, where he served as chief of the Criminal Division and assistant United States attorney.

=== U.S. Attorney for the Central District of Illinois ===
On October 27, 2021, President Joe Biden announced Harris as a nominee to be United States attorney for the Central District of Illinois. On December 2, 2021, his nomination was reported out of committee by a voice vote. On December 7, 2021, his nomination was confirmed in the United States Senate. He was sworn into office on December 13, 2021. Harris, the first Black individual to hold this position, had previously served as an Assistant United States Attorney in the Central District for more than 30 years, during which he held various leadership roles including Chief of the Criminal Division.

During his tenure, Harris’s office prosecuted a broad array of cases involving gun violence, financial fraud, drug trafficking, civil rights violations, and public corruption. His work in establishing the Central Illinois Human Trafficking Task Force and other initiatives earned him recognition, including the Department of Justice’s Director’s Award in 2018.

In his resignation announcement, Harris stated that he had submitted his resignation to President Biden, effective January 2, 2025, and that he intended to retire on that day. In his statement, he expressed gratitude for the support of Senators Tammy Duckworth and Dick Durbin and reflected on his more than 30-year career as a federal prosecutor.

Harris's resignation took effect on January 2, 2025.

Legal offices
Preceded by John C. Milhiser	United States Attorney for the Central District of Illinois; 2021–2025	Succeeded by Gregory M. Gilmore; Acting
