= Sanjay Tailor =

Associate Justice of the Supreme Court of Illinois (2026-)

Justice of the Illinois Supreme Court
- Incumbent
- Assumed office January 30, 2026
- Preceded by: Mary Jane Theis

Personal details
- Born: March 12, 1964 (age 62) Maryland, U.S.
- Party: Democratic
- Education: University of Delaware (BS); Loyola University Chicago (JD)

Sanjay Tailor is an American attorney, scientist, and judge who has served as an Associate Justice of the Supreme Court of Illinois since his appointment in 2026. He previously served in the Illinois Court of Appeals from 2022 to 2026 and as a Judge in the Cook County Superior Court from 2003 to 2021. He became the first Asian-American judge on the Supreme Court of Illinois upon his appointment.

== Biography ==
Tailor grew up in Maryland and attended the University of Delaware where he studied biological sciences. After graduation, he worked in a genetics research lab before being inspired by the lawyers in the Iran–Contra affair to become a lawyer and attending the Loyola University Chicago School of Law for his JD, which he earned in 1991.

He worked as an attorney at the law firm Chapman and Cutler and later at the First National Bank of Chicago before serving as an Assistant Cook County Attorney. He was appointed to the Cook County Superior Court in 2003. During his time on the court, he wrote a law review article for the Loyola University Chicago Law Review. He was assigned to serve as Presiding Judge of the County Division in 2021 and then was appointed to the Illinois Appellate Court in 2022. He also served as President of the Lawyers Club of Chicago.

He was selected by Judge Mary Jane Theis to be her successor on the Supreme Court of Illinois in January 2026, making him the first Asian-American justice on the Illinois Supreme Court. His term will last until December 2028.

Legal offices
Preceded by Mary Jane Theis	Justice of the Illinois Supreme Court; 2026–present	Incumbent
