= Ken Wendt =

American football player, jurist, and politician (1910–1982)

Profile
- Position: Guard

Personal information
- Born: January 29, 1910; Chicago, Illinois, U.S.
- Died: January 19, 1982 (aged 71); Chicago, Illinois, U.S.
- Listed height: 6 ft 0 in (1.83 m)
- Listed weight: 195 lb (88 kg)

Career information
- College: Marquette

Career history
- Chicago Cardinals (1932)

Career statistics
- Games played: 1
- Stats at Pro Football Reference

Kenneth R. Wendt (January 29, 1910 – January 19, 1982) was an American football player, jurist, and politician.

Wendt was a guard for the Chicago Cardinals of the National Football League (NFL) in 1932. He then served in the Illinois General Assembly and as a judge in Cook County, Illinois.

== Early life and career ==
Wendt was born in Chicago and graduated DePaul Academy High School. He played college football at Marquette University. After graduation, he earned a spot with the Chicago Cardinals during the 1932 NFL season.

== Political career ==
He retired from the game after the 1932 season in order to study law at John Marshall Law School. Wendt served as a member of the Illinois House of Representatives from 1952 to 1962, as a Democrat, when he was elected to the Cook County bench. He served as Chief Judge of the Narcotics Division of the Criminal Courts and then as judge of the Criminal Court for the Cook County Circuit Court.

A lifelong Chicagoan, Wendt died in Chicago on January 19, 1982.

== Awards and honors ==
Wendt Playlot Park, a children's playlot in Chicago, is named in Wendt's honor.

== Personal life ==
Wendt's daughter, Mary Jane Theis, is a justice of the Illinois Supreme Court.
