= James Burgess (attorney) =

American attorney

James R. Burgess Jr. (December 19, 1915 – June 22, 1997) was an American attorney from Illinois who served as the United States Attorney for the Eastern District of Illinois from 1977 to 1978 and the Southern District of Illinois from 1978 to 1982.

Burgess was born December 19, 1915, in Algood, Tennessee. During World War II, Burgess served in the 761st Tank Battalion. After his time in the military, Burgess moved to Champaign to attend the University of Illinois College of Law.

In 1972, he was elected the State's Attorney for Champaign County, Illinois. He was the county's sole Democratic countywide officeholder and the first African-American elected a State's Attorney in Illinois. Burgess lost the 1976 general election to Republican Thomas Difanis.

In 1977, President Jimmy Carter appointed Burgess the United States Attorney for the Eastern District of Illinois to succeed the late Henry A. Schwartz. In 1978, the Federal District Court Regorganization Act of 1978, replaced Illinois's northern, eastern, and southern districts with a northern, central and southern district. Burgess became the U.S. Attorney for the Southern District, the same district to which former Eastern District's main courthouse in St. Clair County was situated.

Burgess died June 22, 1997. In 2014, the post office in Champaign, Illinois was named in honor of Burgess.
