= Thomas R. Fitzgerald (judge) =

American judge (1941–2015)

Chief Justice of the Illinois Supreme Court
- In office September 2008 – October 2010
- Preceded by: Robert R. Thomas
- Succeeded by: Mary Jane Theis

Justice of the Illinois Supreme Court
- In office 2000–2008

Personal details
- Born: July 10, 1941 Chicago, Illinois, U.S.
- Died: November 1, 2015 (aged 74) La Grange, Illinois, U.S.
- Party: Democratic
- Education: Loyola University Chicago; The John Marshall Law School (LLB, JD)

Thomas Robert Fitzgerald (July 10, 1941 – November 1, 2015) was a chief justice of the Illinois Supreme Court. Amid the impeachment of governor Rod Blagojevich, Fitzgerald became the first Illinois chief justice to preside over a gubernatorial impeachment trial.

== Early life and career ==
Born in Chicago on July 10, 1941, Fitzgerald graduated from Leo Catholic High School in 1959. He attended Loyola University Chicago before enlisting in the United States Navy. Following his tour of duty in the Navy, he graduated with honors from The John Marshall Law School, where he was a founder of the school's current law review and served as its associate editor.

The son of a circuit court judge, Fitzgerald began his own career in the law as a prosecutor in the Cook County, Illinois State's Attorney's Office. When first elected to the bench in 1976, he was the youngest Cook County judge. He served as a trial judge in the Criminal Court from 1976 to 1987, when he was assigned Supervising Judge of Traffic Court. In 1989, he returned to the Criminal Division as Presiding judge. He was also appointed to serve as presiding judge of Illinois's first statewide Grand Jury. He was elected to the Supreme Court of Illinois for the First District in 2000.

As a law professor, Fitzgerald taught at The John Marshall Law School and Chicago-Kent College of Law, where he was assistant coordinator of the trial advocacy program from 1986 to 1996. He also has taught at the Einstein Institute for Science, Health and the Courts.

Fitzgerald served as president of the Illinois Judges' Association, chair of the Illinois Supreme Court Special Committee on Capital Cases, member of the Governor's Task Force on Crime and Corrections, chairman of several committees of the Illinois Judicial Conference, member of the Chicago Bar Association's Board of Managers and past chairman of the Chicago Bar Association's committees on constitutional law and long-range planning.

== Chief Justice ==
He was elected Chief Justice of the Illinois Supreme Court on May 19, 2008, with his term effective September 6, 2008.

On January 26, 2009, he became the first Illinois chief justice to preside over the impeachment trial of a sitting governor, as he opened proceedings in the impeachment trial of Governor Rod Blagojevich.

=== Retirement and death ===
Fitzgerald retired in October, 2010. He announced his retirement on September 13, 2010, citing a recent diagnosis of Parkinson's Disease. Fitzgerald died on November 1, 2015, at his home from the disease at the age of 74.

== Awards and honors ==
Fitzgerald has been awarded the Outstanding Judicial Performance Award by the Chicago Crime Commission and honored as Celtic Man of the Year by the Celtic Legal Society. He received the Herman Kogan Media Award for Excellence in Broadcast Journalism. The Lawyers' Assistance Program honored him in 2000 with the Hon. John Powers Crowley Award. He is the 2001 recipient of the John Marshall Law School Freedom Award. In 2003, Fitzgerald was awarded the Joel Flaum Award by the Chicago Inn of Court and the Chicago-Kent College of Law Professional Achievement Award. In 2005, Fitzgerald was named Catholic Lawyer of the Year by the Catholic Lawyers Guild of Chicago. In 2008, he was awarded the John Paul Stevens Award by the Chicago Bar Association and the Chicago Bar Foundation. He is a member of the Leo High School Hall of Fame.

Fitzgerald was named Chicago Lawyer's 2010 Person of the Year.
