= Michael P. McCuskey =

American judge (born 1948)

Michael Patrick McCuskey

Senior Judge of the United States District Court for the Central District of Illinois
- In office June 30, 2013 – May 31, 2014

Chief Judge of the United States District Court for the Central District of Illinois
- In office December 14, 2004 – March 12, 2012
- Preceded by: Joe Billy McDade
- Succeeded by: James Shadid

Judge of the United States District Court for the Central District of Illinois
- In office April 3, 1998 – June 30, 2013
- Appointed by: Bill Clinton
- Preceded by: Harold Baker
- Succeeded by: Colin S. Bruce

Personal details
- Born: Michael Patrick McCuskey; June 30, 1948 (age 78) Peoria, Illinois
- Party: Democratic
- Education: Illinois State University (BS); Saint Louis University (JD)

Michael Patrick McCuskey (born June 30, 1948) is the Illinois Legislative Inspector General since his appointment on February 17, 2022. He has served as a state circuit and appellate judge, and a United States district judge of the United States District Court for the Central District of Illinois.

== Education and legal career ==
In 1966, McCuskey graduated in a class of 16 students at Sparland High School, (Note: Sparland High School was consolidated into the current Midland High School.) Sparland, Illinois. He was recruited to Illinois State University in 1966 by baseball coach Duffy Bass, who told McCuskey about the new Political Science department starting at ISU that autumn. While at ISU, he was a member of the 1969 baseball team that played in the NCAA College Division championships; a sore arm ended his pitching career. McCuskey received a Bachelor of Science degree from Illinois State University in 1970 as part the first class to graduate from ISU's Political Science department. Following graduation, he was a baseball coach and history teacher at Ottawa Township High School, Ottawa, Illinois for two years, then entered the Saint Louis University School of Law, where he received his Juris Doctor in 1975. He was in private practice as a partner in the law firm of Pace, McCuskey and Galley in Lacon, Illinois from 1975 to 1988, and was also the chief public defender of Marshall County, Illinois, from 1976 to 1988.

== Judicial career ==
=== State judicial service ===
McCuskey was elected an Illinois state circuit court judge on the Tenth Judicial Circuit from 1988 to 1990, where he sat in felony court at Peoria. When two new seats were created on the Illinois Appellate Court, he chose to run for one of the newly created seats. In the 1990 general election, McCuskey defeated Republican candidate William Holdridge. Robert A. Barnes Jr. was appointed by the Illinois Supreme Court to succeed him in the Tenth Circuit effective January 3, 1991.

McCuskey served as a judge on the Illinois Appellate Court from 1990 to 1998. In 1993, he was selected its presiding judge. In 1991, he received the Illinois Public Defender Association's Award of Excellence and Meritorious Service. While an appellate court judge, McCuskey was appointed to the Administrative Committee, replacing Tobias Barry, who had served as committee chairman.

After his confirmation to the federal bench by the U.S. Senate, the Illinois Supreme Court appointed former state legislator Judy Koehler to the vacancy.

=== Federal judicial service ===
McCuskey was nominated for the United States District Court for the Central District of Illinois by President Bill Clinton on July 31, 1997, to a seat vacated by Harold Baker. McCuskey and G. Patrick Murphy's respective nominations were held by Senator Phil Gramm in retaliation for Carol Moseley Braun blocking Gramm's preferred nominee to the Commodity Futures Trading Commission until the intervention of George Ryan. McCuskey was confirmed by the United States Senate on April 2, 1998, and received his commission on April 3, 1998. He served as chief judge of the district from December 14, 2004 (Note: Illinois State University's Trustee biography says that McCuskey's chief judge term started on December 14, 2004; Greyheart says only December 2004; the Federal Judicial Center biography says only 2004; Kravetz in the Peoria Journal Star says "since 2005".) to March 12, 2012, when he swore in successor James E. Shadid. McCuskey took senior status on June 30, 2013, and retired from the bench on May 31, 2014.

=== Return to state judicial service ===
McCuskey was appointed to the Illinois Tenth Judicial Circuit, his original seat, taking office on June 3, 2014, to complete the term of the retiring Kevin Galley. McCuskey took up his seat in Marshall County, and stated his intention to run for election in November 2016. In 2016, McCuskey was elected to the vacancy unopposed. He stepped down as a judge in 2020 The Illinois Supreme Court appointed Paul Bauer as McCuskey's successor as the resident circuit judge of Marshall County.

== ISU Board of Trustees ==
Governor Rod Blagojevich appointed McCuskey a member of the Illinois State University Board of Trustees for a term commencing September 29, 2005 and ending January 17, 2011. McCuskey was confirmed by the Illinois Senate in a unanimous vote on November 3, 2005. In 2011, Governor Pat Quinn reappointed McCuskey to the ISU Board of Trustees for a term from 2011 to 2017. Upon reassuming a circuit court judgeship in 2014, he stepped down from the ISU Board of Trustees and was replaced by Robert Dobski.

== Illinois Legislative Inspector General ==
On July 14, 2021, Carol M. Pope announced her intent to resign as the Legislative Inspector General effective January 31, 2022. The Illinois Senate voted in favor of McCuskey's nomination on February 16, 2022, and the Illinois House voted in favor of his nomination the next day. McCuskey was appointed to complete the remainder of Pope's term. On May 9, 2023, the Illinois General Assembly voted to appoint McCuskey to a five-year term as the Legislative Inspector General to start June 30, 2023 and end June 30, 2028.

== Personal ==
McCuskey's wife, Barbara Huber McCuskey, graduated from Illinois State University in 1987; as of 2006, they had one son and lived in Urbana, and as of 2015 lived in Lacon.

== Sources ==
Legal offices
| Preceded by Harold Baker | Judge of the United States District Court for the Central District of Illinois; 1998–2013 | Succeeded by Colin S. Bruce |
| Preceded by Joe Billy McDade | Chief Judge of the United States District Court for the Central District of Illinois; 2004–2012 | Succeeded by James Shadid |
