= Charles E. Freeman =

American attorney and judge (1933–2020)

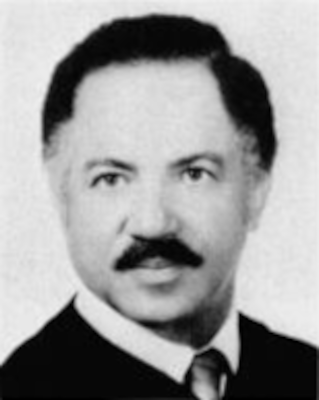

Justice of the Illinois Supreme Court
- In office November 6, 1990 – June 14, 2018
- Preceded by: Daniel P. Ward
- Succeeded by: P. Scott Neville Jr.

Personal details
- Born: December 12, 1933 Richmond, Virginia, U.S.
- Died: March 2, 2020 (aged 86) Chicago, Illinois, U.S.
- Education: Virginia Union University (BA); John Marshall Law School (JD)

Charles E. Freeman (December 12, 1933 – March 2, 2020) was an American attorney who served as a justice of the Illinois Supreme Court. He was elected to the position on November 6, 1990, becoming its first African-American justice. He served as chief justice from May 12, 1997, to January 1, 2000. He retired from the court on June 14, 2018.

== Early life, family and education ==
Freeman was born in Richmond, Virginia. Freeman received his undergraduate degree from Virginia Union University in 1954 and J.D. degree from the John Marshall Law School in Chicago in 1962.

== Career ==
Illinois Governor Otto Kerner appointed Freeman to the Illinois Industrial Commission in January 1965 as an arbitrator. Freeman heard thousands of work-related injury cases. In September 1973 Governor Dan Walker named Freeman to the Illinois Commerce Commission, a rate regulatory agency with power over telephone, electricity and gas companies. Freeman worked on the commission until December 1976.

Freeman also conducted a general law practice from 1962 until 1976, when he was elected to the Cook County Circuit Court. He served ten years on the court and swore in Harold Washington, a personal friend, as Mayor of Chicago. Freeman was a member of several bar associations and professional judiciary societies, and has won a number of awards throughout his career.

From his re-election in 2002, Freeman ranked as the senior member of the Illinois Supreme Court until his retirement in 2018. While on the court he showed particular interest in administrative reform and prosecutorial misconduct cases.

== Personal life ==
Freeman was married to his wife, Marylee, until her death in 2013. They have one son, an attorney, and two grandchildren. Freeman died on March 2, 2020, in Chicago. He was 86.

== See also ==
- List of African-American jurists
