= United States District Court for the Central District of Illinois =

United States federal district court in Illinois

Coordinates: 40°41′42″N 89°35′30″W

- (C.D. Ill.)
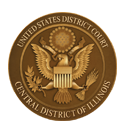

- Map indicating the changing Districts of Illinois
- Location: Springfield More locations: United States Courthouse (Peoria); Urbana / Champaign; Rock Island; Danville; Quincy
- Appeals to: Seventh Circuit
- Established: March 31, 1979
- Judges: 4
- Chief Judge: Colin S. Bruce

Officers of the court
- U.S. Attorney: Gregory M. Gilmore
- U.S. Marshal: Brendan O. Heffner
- www.ilcd.uscourts.gov

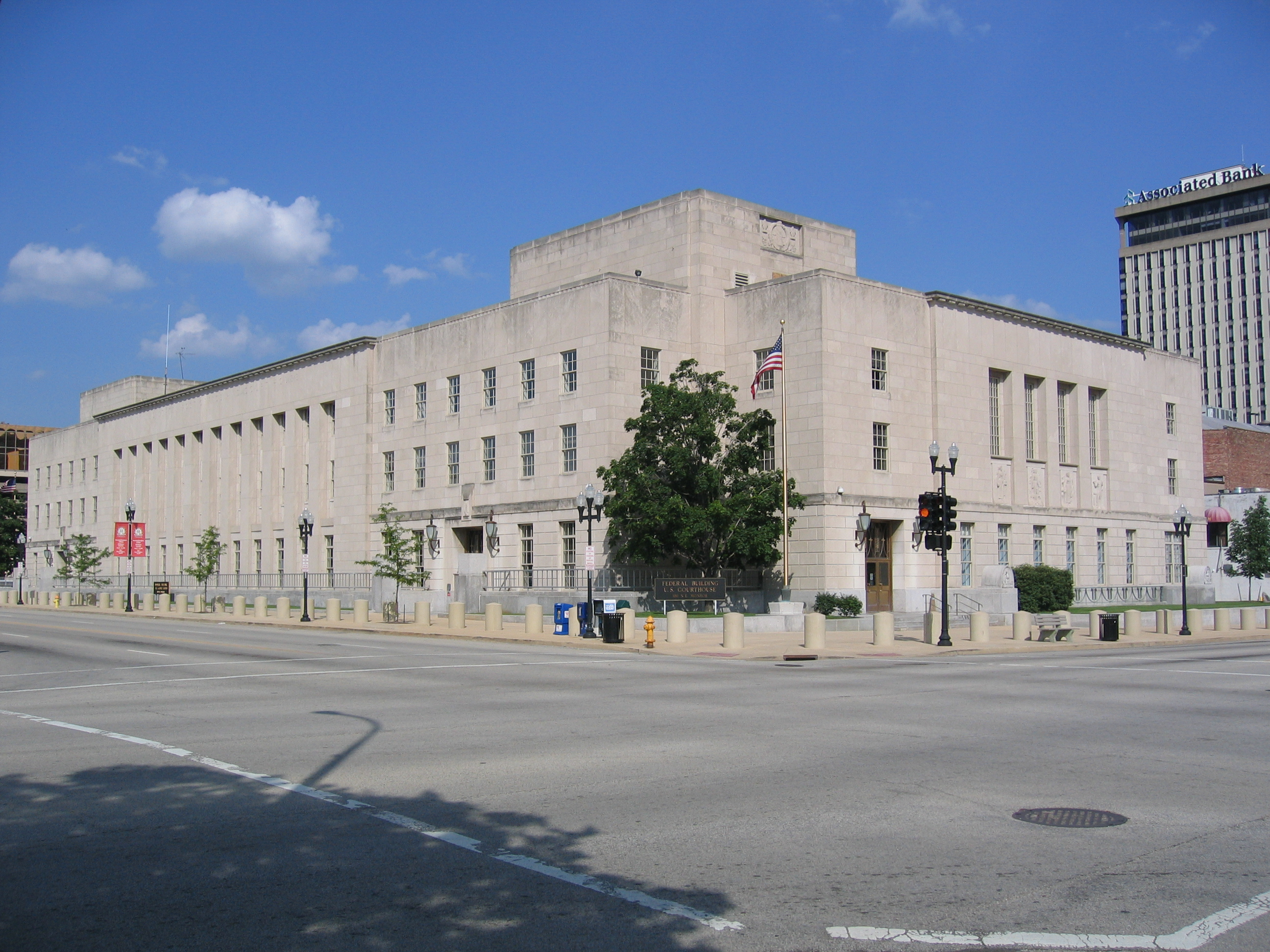
U.S. Courthouse in downtown Peoria (2008)

The United States District Court for the Central District of Illinois (in case citations, C.D. Ill.) serves the residents of forty-six counties, which are divided into four divisions. The counties are: Adams, Brown, Bureau, Cass, Champaign, Christian, Coles, DeWitt, Douglas, Edgar, Ford, Fulton, Greene, Hancock, Henderson, Henry, Iroquois, Kankakee, Knox, Livingston, Logan, McDonough, McLean, Macoupin, Macon, Marshall, Mason, Menard, Mercer, Montgomery, Morgan, Moultrie, Peoria, Piatt, Pike, Putnam, Rock Island, Sangamon, Schuyler, Scott, Shelby, Stark, Tazewell, Vermilion, Warren, and Woodford counties.

The courthouses for the Central District's four divisions are in Peoria, Rock Island, Springfield, and Urbana. In 2018, all court operations for the Rock Island District were moved to the federal courthouse in Davenport, Iowa, due to uninhabitable conditions at the Rock Island courthouse.

Appeals are taken to the United States Court of Appeals for the Seventh Circuit (except for patent claims and claims against the U.S. government under the Tucker Act, which are appealed to the Federal Circuit).

As of January 3, 2025, the United States attorney is Gregory M. Gilmore.

== History ==
The United States District Court for the District of Illinois was established by a statute passed by the United States Congress on March 3, 1819, 3 Stat. 502. The act established a single office for a judge to preside over the court. Initially, the court was not within any existing judicial circuit, and appeals from the court were taken directly to the United States Supreme Court. In 1837, Congress created the United States Court of Appeals for the Seventh Circuit, placing it in Chicago, Illinois and giving it jurisdiction over the District of Illinois, 5 Stat. 176.

On February 13, 1855, by 10 Stat. 606, the District of Illinois was subdivided into Northern and the Southern Districts. An Eastern District was created on March 3, 1905, by 33 Stat. 992, by splitting counties out of the Northern and Southern Districts. It was later eliminated in a reorganization on October 2, 1978, which replaced it with the United States District Court for the Central District of Illinois District, 92 Stat. 883. The newly created Central District was formed primarily from parts of the Southern District, and returned some counties to the Northern District. Some judges from both the Eastern and Southern Districts were transferred to the Central District by operation of law.

== Current judges ==
As of March 12, 2026:

#	Title	Judge	Duty station	Born	Term of service			Appointed by
#	Title	Judge	Duty station	Born	Active	Chief	Senior	Appointed by
12	Chief Judge	Colin S. Bruce	Urbana	1965	2013–present	2026–present	—	Obama
11	District Judge	Sara Darrow	Rock Island	1970	2011–present	2019–2026	—	Obama
13	District Judge	Colleen Lawless	Springfield	1983	2023–present	—	—	Biden
14	District Judge	Jonathan E. Hawley	Peoria	1971	2024–present	—	—	Biden
4	Senior Judge	Michael M. Mihm	Peoria	1943	1982–2009	1991–1998	2009–present	Reagan
6	Senior Judge	Joe Billy McDade	inactive	1937	1991–2010	1998–2004	2010–present	G.H.W. Bush
10	Senior Judge	Sue E. Myerscough	Springfield	1951	2011–2023	—	2023–present	Obama

== Former judges ==
#	Judge	Born–died	Active service	Chief Judge	Senior status	Appointed by	Reason for termination
—	Henry Seiler Wise	1909–1982	—	—	1979–1982 (Note: Reassigned from the Eastern District of Illinois)	L. Johnson / Operation of law	death
1	Robert Dale Morgan	1912–2002	1979–1982 (Note: Reassigned from the Southern District of Illinois)	1979–1982	1982–2002	L. Johnson / Operation of law	death
2	J. Waldo Ackerman	1926–1984	1979–1984	1982–1984	—	Ford / Operation of law	death
3	Harold Baker	1929–2023	1979–1994	1984–1991	1994–2022	Carter / Operation of law	retirement
5	Richard Henry Mills	1929–2023	1985–1997	—	1997–2023	Reagan	death
7	Michael P. McCuskey	1948–present	1998–2013	2004–2012	2013–2014	Clinton	retirement
8	Jeanne E. Scott	1948–2019	1998–2010	—	—	Clinton	resignation
9	James Shadid	1957–present	2011–2024	2012–2019	2024–2025	Obama	retirement

== Chief judges ==
Chief judges have administrative responsibilities with respect to their district court. Unlike the Supreme Court, where one justice is specifically nominated to be chief, the office of chief judge rotates among the district court judges. To be chief, a judge must have been in active service on the court for at least one year, be under the age of 65, and have not previously served as chief judge.

A vacancy is filled by the judge highest in seniority among the group of qualified judges. The chief judge serves for a term of seven years, or until age 70, whichever occurs first. The age restrictions are waived if no members of the court would otherwise be qualified for the position.

When the office was created in 1948, the chief judge was the longest-serving judge who had not elected to retire, on what has since 1958 been known as senior status, or declined to serve as chief judge. After August 6, 1959, judges could not become or remain chief after turning 70 years old. The current rules have been in operation since October 1, 1982.

== Succession of seats ==
Seat 1
Seat reassigned from Eastern District on March 31, 1979 by 93 Stat. 6
Baker	1979–1994
McCuskey	1998–2013
Bruce	2013–present

Seat 2
Seat reassigned from Southern District on March 31, 1979 by 93 Stat. 6
Ackerman	1979–1984
Mills	1985–1997
Scott	1998–2010
Myerscough	2011–2023
Lawless	2023–present

Seat 3
Seat reassigned from Southern District on March 31, 1979 by 93 Stat. 6
Morgan	1979–1982
Mihm	1982–2009
Shadid	2011–2024
Hawley	2024–present

Seat 4
Seat established on December 1, 1990 by 104 Stat. 5089 (temporary)
Seat made permanent on November 2, 2002 by 116 Stat. 1758
McDade	1991–2010
Darrow	2011–present

== U.S. Attorneys ==
- Gerald D. Fines 1977–86
- J. William Roberts 1986–93
- Byron G. Cudmore 1993
- Frances C. Hulin 1993–2002
- Jan Paul Miller 2002–2005
- Rodger A. Heaton 2005–2009
- Jeffrey B. Lang 2009–2010
- James A. Lewis 2010–2016
- John C. Milhiser 2018–2021
- Gregory K. Harris 2021–2025
- Greg Gilmore 2025-Present

== See also ==
- Courts of Illinois
- List of current United States district judges
- List of United States federal courthouses in Illinois
