= James Shadid =

American judge (born 1957)

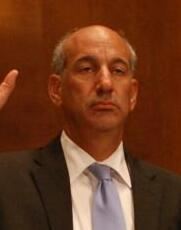
- Shadid in 2014

13th President of Bradley University
- Incumbent
- Assumed office April 1, 2025
- Preceded by: Stephen Standifird

Senior Judge of the United States District Court for the Central District of Illinois
- In office September 27, 2024 – April 1, 2025

Chief Judge of the United States District Court for the Central District of Illinois
- In office March 12, 2012 – March 12, 2019
- Preceded by: Michael P. McCuskey
- Succeeded by: Sara Darrow

Judge of the United States District Court for the Central District of Illinois
- In office March 10, 2011 – September 27, 2024
- Appointed by: Barack Obama
- Preceded by: Michael M. Mihm
- Succeeded by: Jonathan E. Hawley

Personal details
- Born: September 27, 1957 (age 68) Peoria, Illinois, U.S.
- Education: Bradley University (BS); University of Illinois Chicago (JD)

James Edward Shadid (born September 27, 1957) is a former United States district judge of the United States District Court for the Central District of Illinois, serving from 2011 to 2025. In April 2025, he was appointed as president of Bradley University.

== Early life and education ==
Shadid was born in 1957 in Peoria, Illinois. His father was George Shadid, who eventually became sheriff of Peoria County, Illinois, and an Illinois state senator. Shadid earned a Bachelor of Science from Bradley University in 1979 and his Juris Doctor from University of Illinois Chicago School of Law, then known as the John Marshall Law School, in 1983.

== Career ==
Shadid was in private practice from 1983 to 2001, additionally acting as part-time public defender in Peoria County from 1986 to 2001 and a commissioner of the Illinois Court of Claims from 1996 to 2001. In December 2001, Shadid was appointed to the Tenth Judicial Circuit of Illinois. He was primarily in felony court, with other work in misdemeanor and civil court.

=== Federal judicial service ===
On May 27, 2010, President Barack Obama nominated Shadid to replace Judge Michael Mihm on the United States District Court for the Central District of Illinois. On March 7, 2011, he was confirmed by the Senate by an 89–0 vote. He received his commission on March 10, 2011. Shadid served as the chief judge of the Central District from March 12, 2012, to March 12, 2019; he was sworn in by his predecessor Judge Michael P. McCuskey. He assumed senior status on September 27, 2024. Shadid retired from active service on April 1, 2025.

=== Bradley University ===
The Bradley University Board of Trustees appointed Shadid the president of the university to replace Stephen Standifird. Shadid assumed the role on April 1, 2025.

Legal offices
Preceded by Michael M. Mihm	Judge of the United States District Court for the Central District of Illinois; 2011–2024	Succeeded by Jonathan E. Hawley
Preceded by Michael P. McCuskey	Chief Judge of the United States District Court for the Central District of Illinois; 2012–2019	Succeeded by Sara Darrow
