= List of Phi Alpha Delta members =

Phi Alpha Delta is a North American professional fraternity composed of pre-law and law students, legal educators, attorneys, judges, and government officials. It was established in Chicago, Illinois on November 8, 1902. Following are some of its notable members.

== Academia ==
- Vincent Martin Bonventre, distinguished professor at Albany Law School
- Lee Fisher, president of Baldwin Wallace University, Lieutenant Governor of Ohio, Attorney General of Ohio, Ohio Senate, and Ohio House of Representatives

== Business ==
- Nello Ferrara (Story 1942), executive of Ferrara Candy Company and creator of Lemonhead and Atomic Fireball candies
- L. R. Kershaw (Magruder), founder of the Eastern Oklahoma Electric Traction Company and an Aberdeen Angus breeder

== Entertainment ==
- Joseph Brown (McKenna), arbiter of the reality court show Judge Joe Brown
- Kim McGuire (O'Niell 1982), actress, author, and lawyer
- Omarosa Manigault Newman, reality television contestant, known for appearing on The Apprentice and Big Brother
- John P. Noonan, percussionist and music educator
- Joseph Wapner (Ross 1982), judge of the reality court show The People's Court

== Government and military ==
- Hanson Edward Ely, dean of the War College of the United States Army and major general
- Guy Otto Farmer, civil servant and chairman of the National Labor Relations Board
- Robert E. Freer, Federal Trade Commission chair
- John J. Pershing, United States Army general and founder of Pershing Rifles

== Judiciary ==
=== U.S. Supreme Court ===
- Samuel Alito (Paterson 2003), associate justice of the Supreme Court of the United States
- Stephen Breyer (Redding Alumni 1996) associate justice of the Supreme Court of the United States
- Warren E. Burger, chief justice of the Supreme Court of the United States
- Harold H. Burton, associate justice of the Supreme Court of the United States, U.S. Senate, Ohio House of Representatives, and Mayor of Cleveland
- Tom C. Clark (Taney 1945) associate justice of the Supreme Court of the United States
- William O. Douglas, associate justice of the Supreme Court of the United States and chairman of the Securities and Exchange Commission
- Ruth Bader Ginsburg (Redding Alumni 1994), associate justice of the Supreme Court of the United States
- Elena Kagan (Redding Alumni 2011), associate justice of the Supreme Court of the United States and Solicitor General of the United States
- Sonia Sotomayor (Redding Alumni 2010), associate justice of the Supreme Court of the United States
- Charles Evans Whittaker (Benton 1922), associate justice of the Supreme Court of the United States

=== Federal Courts ===
- Jesse C. Adkins, senior judge of the United States District Court for the District of Columbia
- Robert Aguilar, senior judge of the United States District Court for the Northern District of California
- C. Clyde Atkins, senior judge of the United States District Court for the Southern District of Florida
- Thomas A. Ballantine Jr., senior judge of the United States District Court for the Western District of Kentucky
- Campbell E. Beaumont, judge of the United States District Court for the Southern District of California
- Charles Hardy Carr, senior judge of the United States District Court for the Central District of California
- James Marshall Carter, senior judge of the United States Court of Appeals for the Ninth Circuit and chief judge of the United States District Court for the Southern District of California
- Philip J. Finnegan, judge of the United States Court of Appeals for the Seventh Circuit
- Herbert Funk Goodrich, judge of the United States Court of Appeals for the Third Circuit
- Lapsley W. Hamblen Jr., judge of the United States Tax Court
- Joseph W. Hatchett (Fletcher 1975), chief judge of the United States Court of Appeals for the Eleventh Circuit
- Joseph C. Howard Sr., senior judge of the United States District Court for the District of Maryland
- William Matthew Kidd, senior judge of the United States District Court for the Northern District of West Virginia
- George N. Leighton (Chicago Alumni, honorary, 2009), senior judge of the United States District Court for the Northern District of Illinois
- M. James Lorenz, senior judge of the United States District Court for the Southern District of California
- J. Warren Madden (Beaumont) senior judge of the United States Court of Claims and List of Chairmen of the National Labor Relations Board
- John Michael Manos, senior judge of the United States District Court for the Northern District of Ohio
- John Sirica (Taft 1941), senior judge of the United States District Court for the District of Columbia
- Arthur J. Tuttle, Judge of the United States District Court for the Eastern District of Michigan and Michigan Senate
- Laughlin Edward Waters Sr., senior judge of the United States District Court for the Central District of California

=== State Supreme Courts ===
- John Taylor Adams, justice of the Colorado Supreme Court
- Robert G. Allbee, justice of the Iowa Supreme Court
- Bond Almand, chief justice of the Supreme Court of Georgia and Georgia House of Representatives
- Don Barnes, associate justice of the Oklahoma Supreme Court
- Wayne W. Bayless, justice on the Oklahoma Supreme Court
- Campbell E. Beaumont, judge of the United States District Court for the Southern District of California
- Robert Benham (A. H. Stephens 1968), chief justice of the Supreme Court of Georgia
- John T. Broderick Jr. (New Hampshire Statewide Alumni), New Hampshire Supreme Court Justice
- William T. Brotherton Jr., chief justice of the West Virginia Supreme Court and president of the West Virginia Senate
- Herbert R. Brown, associate justice of the Supreme Court of Ohio
- Haslett Platt Burke, chief justice of Colorado Supreme Court
- Eugene A. Burdick, North Dakota Fifth Judicial District judge and surrogate judge of the North Dakota Supreme Court
- Edward F. Carter, justice of the Nebraska Supreme Court
- Lloyd Church, justice of the New York Supreme Court
- Christian Compton, justice of the Supreme Court of Virginia
- Maura D. Corrigan (Murphy 1970), chief justice of the Michigan Supreme Court and director of the Michigan Department of Human Services
- Ann K. Covington (Lawson 1988), chief justice of the Supreme Court of Missouri
- Caswell J. Crebs, justice of the Illinois Supreme Court
- Maria Elena Cruz, justice of the Arizona Supreme Court
- John T. Culbertson Jr., justice of the Supreme Court of Illinois
- Sidna Poage Dalton, chief justice of the Supreme Court of Missouri
- Fred Henry Davis, chief justice of the Supreme Court of Florida, Florida Attorney General, and Speaker of the Florida House of Representatives
- James R. Dean, justice of the Nebraska Supreme Court
- Douglas L. Edmonds, associate justice of the Supreme Court of California
- W. H. Ellis, chief justice of the Supreme Court of Florida
- Richard Ervin, chief justice of the Supreme Court of Florida and Florida Attorney General
- James G. Exum, chief justice of the North Carolina Supreme Court and North Carolina House of Representatives
- Edward Fadeley, justice of the Oregon Supreme Court, Oregon House of Representatives, and the Oregon State Senate
- Frederick F. Faville, chief justice of the Iowa Supreme Court
- William Henry Folland, chief justice of the Utah Supreme Court
- John F. Fontron, justice of the Kansas Supreme Court
- Albert T. Frantz, chief justice of Colorado Supreme Court
- Harry Freeland Garrett, justice of the Iowa Supreme Court, Attorney General of Iowa, and Iowa House of Representatives
- Frank Herbert Hall, chief justice of Colorado Supreme Court
- Harry B. Hershey, justice of the Supreme Court of Illinois
- Byron O. House, chief justice of the Supreme Court of Illinois
- Edward W. Hudgins, chief justice of the Supreme Court of Virginia and Virginia House of Delegates
- Paul Winniford Hyatt, justice of the Idaho Supreme Court
- Amos W. Jackson, justice of the Indiana Supreme Court
- Schuyler W. Jackson, justice of the Kansas Supreme Court
- William D. Jochems, justice of the Kansas Supreme Court
- Lawrence W. I'Anson, chief justice of the Supreme Court of Virginia
- Luke E. Linnan, justice of the Iowa Supreme Court
- Haymond Maxwell, judge of the Supreme Court of Appeals of West Virginia, West Virginia House of Delegates, circuit judge in West Virginia for the 15th Judicial Circuit
- Mary Ann McMorrow (Chicago Alumni 1992), justice on the Supreme Court of Illinois
- Stanley Mosk, associate justice of the California Supreme Court and Attorney General of California
- Paul Martin Newby, chief justice of the North Carolina Supreme Court
- Charles Austin O'Niell, chief justice of the Louisiana Supreme Court
- Roger A. Page (Sanford 2016) chief justice of the Tennessee Supreme Court
- Marlin T. Phelps, chief justice of the Arizona Supreme Court
- Edward E. Pringle, justice of Colorado Supreme Court
- Peggy Quince (Cardozo 1972), chief justice of the Supreme Court of Florida
- R. William Riggs, justice of the Oregon Supreme Court
- Howard C. Ryan, justice of the Illinois Supreme Court
- Edward Ray Sloan, justice of the Kansas Supreme Court and Kansas House of Representatives
- Milford K. Smith, justice of the Vermont Supreme Court
- Elwyn Thomas, chief justice of the Florida Supreme Court

=== Local and lower state courts ===
- S. Thomas Currin II, judge on the North Carolina Superior Court
- Albert N. Gualano, judge of the Municipal Court in Chicago
- DaSean Jones, judge of the Texas 180th District Court

== Law ==
=== Attorney ===
- James P. Aylward, lawyer and campaign manager for Harry S. Truman
- Robert Bilott (McKinley 1987), environmental lawyer and author
- Johnnie Cochran (Ford 1960), defense lawyer for O. J. Simpson
- Robert J. Gorman, lawyer who practiced probate and civil rights law and was counsel for Roosevelt University
- Fred Gray (Central Alabama Alumni 2020), civil rights attorney who represented Rosa Parks, the NAACP, and Martin Luther King Jr.
- Arsalan Iftikhar (C. Clark 1999), human rights lawyer and author
- Stephen Jones, defense attorney
- Edward L. Masry (Ford 1958), lawyer who was instrumental in bringing about the multi-plaintiff direct action suit against Pacific Gas and Electric Company
- Charlotte E. Ray, first African American female lawyer in the United States

=== Attorney General ===
- Fred Jason Babcock, Idaho Attorney General
- George F. Barrett, Illinois Attorney General
- Clyde R. Chapman, Maine Attorney General
- Eldon S. Dummit, Attorney General of Kentucky
- Charles William Hadley, Illinois Attorney General
- James Lawrence, Ohio Attorney General
- Ernest Karl Neumann, Attorney General of New Mexico and New Mexico House of Representatives
- K. Berry Peterson, Arizona Attorney General

=== U.S. Attorney ===
- Frank D. Allen, United States Attorney for the District of Massachusetts
- Frank S. Tavenner Jr., United States Attorney for the Western District of Virginia

== Literature ==
- David A. Embury, mixologist and author of The Fine Art of Mixing Drinks

== Nonprofit and activism ==
- Erin Brockovich (Ford 2004), environmental activist and legal clerk
- Harry E. Johnson, CEO of the Martin Luther King Jr. National Memorial Project Foundation, Inc.
- James C. Logan, national president and expansion leader of Tau Kappa Epsilon fraternity
- Robert M. Wilson Jr., founder of the Wilson History and Research Center,

== Politics ==
=== U.S. Presidents ===
- Joe Biden (Read 1994), President of the United States, Vice President of the United States, and U.S. Senate
- Bill Clinton (Garland 1974) President of the United States and Governor of Arkansas
- Jimmy Carter (Keener 1986), President of the United States, Governor of Georgia, and Georgia State Senate
- Warren G. Harding (Taft 1922) President of the United States, U.S. Senate, and Lieutenant Governor of Ohio
- William Howard Taft (Taft 1909) President of the United States, chief justice of the United States, United States Secretary of War, Governor-General of the Philippines, Provisional Governor of Cuba, and Solicitor General of the United States
- Harry S. Truman (Benton 1945), President of the United States, Vice President of the United States, and U.S. Senate
- Woodrow Wilson (Jefferson) President of the United States, Governor of New Jersey, and President of Princeton University

=== Politicians ===
- E. Ross Adair, U.S. House of Representatives and United States Ambassador to Ethiopia
- Spiro Agnew, Vice President of the United States and Governor of Maryland
- Woodrow Albea, Alabama Senate and Alabama House of Representatives
- Henry J. Allen, Governor of Kansas and U.S. Senate
- Colin Allred (Baylor University Pre-Law 2005), U.S. House of Representatives
- Teller Ammons, Governor of Colorado and Colorado Senate
- Albert E. Anderson, Maine House of Representatives
- James P. Aylward, state chair of the Missouri Democratic Party
- Howard Baker Sr., U.S. House of Representatives and Tennessee House of Representatives
- Alben W. Barkley, Vice President of the United States, U.S. Senate, and U.S. House of Representatives
- Roy Barnes, Governor of Georgia, Georgia State Senate, and Georgia House of Representatives
- Bob Barr (Taft 1974)), U.S. House of Representatives
- Ralph J. Bean, president of the West Virginia Senate
- Allen J. Beermann, Secretary of State of Nebraska
- C. Jasper Bell, U.S. House of Representatives
- Charles Edward Bennett, Colorado Senate and Colorado House of Representatives
- Alan Bible, U.S. Senate and Attorney General of Nevada
- Bernaldo Bicoy, U.S. House of Representatives
- Gus Bilirakis (Brewer 1987), U.S. House of Representatives and Florida House of Representatives
- Francis Marion Bistline, Speaker of the Idaho House of Representatives
- Robert D. Blue, Governor of Iowa, Lieutenant Governor of Iowa, and Speaker of the Iowa House of Representatives
- Roy Blunt (Lawson 1986), U.S. Senate, U.S. House of Representatives, and president of Southwest Baptist University
- Bill Braecklein, Texas Senate and Texas House of Representatives
- Martin A. Brennan, U.S. House of Representatives and Illinois House of Representatives
- John Y. Brown Sr., U.S. House of Representatives and Kentucky House of Representatives
- Sam Brownback (Green 1980), United States Ambassador-at-Large for International Religious Freedom, Governor of Kansas, U.S. Senate, and U.S. House of Representatives
- Barbara Buckley (UNLV Pre-Law 1985), speaker of the Nevada Assembly
- George Butterfield (Watkins 1973), U.S. House of Representatives and associate justice of the North Carolina Supreme Court
- Emmet Byrne, U.S. House of Representatives
- Millard Caldwell, Governor of Florida, U.S. House of Representatives, and justice of the Supreme Court of Florida
- Thaddeus H. Caraway, U.S. Senate and U.S. House of Representatives
- Howard W. Carson, president of the West Virginia Senate
- Albert E. Carter, U.S. House of Representatives
- Oscar L. Chapman, United States Secretary of the Interior
- Virgil Chapman, U.S. Senate and U.S. House of Representatives
- Isaac P. Christiancy, U.S. Senate, justice of the Michigan Supreme Court, and Michigan Senate
- Hillary Clinton (Garland 1980), United States Secretary of State, United States Senator, and First Lady of the United States
- Albert M. Cole, U.S. House of Representatives and Kansas Senate
- Martin Sennet Conner, Governor of Mississippi and Mississippi House of Representatives
- Doug Collins (Hollowell 2005), U.S. House of Representatives, Georgia House of Representatives, and United States Secretary of Veterans Affairs
- Roy Cooper (T. Ruffin 1952), Governor of North Carolina, Attorney General of North Carolina, North Carolina Senate, and North Carolina House of Representatives
- William S. Culbertson, U.S. Ambassador to Romania and U.S Ambassador to Chile
- James Hornor Davis II, West Virginia Senate and West Virginia House of Delegates
- Joe Davis, Florida House of Representatives
- William A. Dawson, U.S. House of Representatives and Utah Senate
- Robert Dold (Adams 1994), U.S. House of Representatives
- Ralph H. Doxey, Mississippi State Senate and Mississippi House of Representatives
- F. Ryan Duffy, U.S. Senate and senior judge of the United States Court of Appeals for the Seventh Circuit
- Edward Fitzsimmons Dunne, Governor of Illinois and Mayor of Chicago
- Arthur Earley, Pennsylvania House of Representatives
- Carl Elliott, U.S. House of Representatives
- Robert Finch, Lieutenant Governor of California and United States Secretary of Health, Education, and Welfare
- Duncan U. Fletcher, U.S. Senate and Mayor of Jacksonville, Florida
- Marcia Fudge (Meck 1981), United States Secretary of Housing and Urban Development
- Eugene Allen Gilmore, Governor-General of the Philippines, Vice Governor-General of the Philippines, and Philippine Secretary of Public Instruction
- Richey V. Graham, Illinois House of Representatives and Illinois Senate
- Dwight H. Green, Governor of Illinois
- Al Green (Jordan 1973), U.S. House of Representatives
- Kossen Gregory, Virginia House of Delegates
- Glenn Grothman (Ryan 1980), U.S. House of Representatives, Wisconsin Senate, and Wisconsin State Assembly
- Frank Guinta (Kenison 1988), U.S. House of Representatives
- Julius Caldeen Gunter, Governor of Colorado and justice of the Colorado Supreme Court
- Luis Gutierrez (Ramos 2001), U.S. House of Representatives and Chicago City Council
- Fred Hall, Governor of Kansas, Lieutenant Governor of Kansas, and justice of the Kansas Supreme Court
- John Hamilton, Kansas House of Representatives and chair of the Republican National Committee
- Alcee Hastings (Fleming 1992), U.S. House of Representatives
- Michael Hastings (Lincoln 2011), Illinois Senate
- Brooks Hays, U.S. House of Representatives and Assistant Secretary of State for Legislative Affairs
- Lawrence Hays, U.S. House of Representatives and Assistant Secretary of State for Legislative Affairs
- Charles B. Hoeven, U.S. House of Representatives and Iowa Senate
- Shirley Hufstedler (Los Angeles Alumni), United States Secretary of Education
- Kenneth Hulshof (Lawson 1998), U.S. House of Representatives
- Wallace E. Hutton, Maryland House of Delegates
- James Inhofe (Hardy 1988), U.S. Senate, U.S. House of Representatives, and Mayor of Tulsa
- Clifford C. Ireland, U.S. House of Representatives
- W. Broughton Johnston, president of the West Virginia Senate
- Barbara Jordan (Jordan 1976), U.S. House of Representatives and Texas Senate
- Goodwin Knight, Governor of California and Lieutenant Governor of California
- William P. Lambertson, U.S. House of Representatives, Kansas Senate, and Kansas House of Representatives
- Robert List, Governor of Nevada and Attorney General of Nevada
- Zoe Lofgren, U.S. House of Representatives
- Curtis Levine, Florida House of Representatives
- Zoe Lofgren (Edmonds 1974), U.S. House of Representatives
- Trent Lott, U.S. Senate and U.S. House of Representatives
- Susana Martinez (Harlan 1984), Governor of New Mexico
- Jim McClure, U.S. Senate, U.S. House of Representatives, and Idaho Senate
- Adam McMullen, Governor of Nebraska, Nebraska Senate, and Nebraska House of Representatives
- Clarence W. Meadows, Governor of West Virginia and Attorney General of West Virginia
- Neil Metcalf, Alabama Senate
- Christian Miele, Maryland Senate and Maryland House of Delegates
- Edwin P. Morrow, Governor of Kentucky
- Edmund Muskie, United States Secretary of State, U.S. Senate, and Governor of Maine
- Lisa Murkowski (Lusk 1983), U.S. Senate and Alaska House of Representatives
- Richard B. Ogilvie, Governor of Illinois
- Walter Orlinsky, Maryland House of Delegates
- John M. Patterson, Governor of Alabama and chief justice of Supreme Court of Alabama
- Claude Pepper, U.S. Senate, U.S. House of Representatives, and Florida House of Representatives
- Joe R. Pool, U.S. House of Representatives
- Omer Rains, California Senate
- Charles Rangel (DeBracton 1958), U.S. House of Representatives and New York State Assembly
- Guy Reschenthaler (Egan 2005), U.S. House of Representatives
- Stacy Ritter, Florida House of Representatives
- Ralph Rivers, U.S. House of Representatives, Mayor of Fairbanks, and Attorney General of the Alaska Territory
- Kenneth A. Roberts, U.S. House of Representatives
- A. Willis Robertson, U.S. Senate, U.S. House of Representatives, and Virginia Senate
- Byron G. Rogers, U.S. House of Representatives, Colorado Attorney General, and speaker of the Colorado House of Representatives
- Hal Rogers (Clay 1963), U.S. House of Representatives
- William N. Rogers, U.S. House of Representatives and New Hampshire House of Representatives
- Harley Rouda (Hayes 1984), U.S. House of Representatives
- Brian Sandoval (McKinely 1987), Governor of Nevada and Attorney General of Nevada
- David E. Satterfield III, U.S. House of Representatives and Virginia House of Delegates
- Harry Sauthoff, U.S. House of Representatives and Wisconsin Senate
- Andrew Frank Schoeppel, Governor of Kansas and U.S. Senate
- Rick Scott (Taney 1976), Governor of Florida and U.S. Senate
- James Sensenbrenner (Ryan 1966), U.S. House of Representatives, Wisconsin Senate, and Wisconsin State Assembly
- Richard Shelby (Morgan 1958), U.S. Senate, U.S. House of Representatives, and Alabama Senate
- Alan Simpson (Blume 1984) U.S. Senate and Wyoming House of Representatives
- Jason Smith (Vaught 2002), U.S. House of Representatives
- Arlen Specter (Calhoun), U.S. Senate
- William Spong Jr., U.S. Senate, Virginia Senate, Dean of William & Mary Law School, and Virginia House of Delegates
- John C. Stennis, U.S. Senate and Mississippi House of Representatives
- William H. Stevenson, U.S. House of Representatives
- Henry C. Stiening, Minnesota Senate
- Marion Ortez Strickland, Georgia House of Representatives
- Charles Taylor, U.S. House of Representatives, North Carolina Senate, and North Carolina House of Representatives
- Senfronia Thompson (Jordan 1975), Texas House of Representative
- John Nicholas Udall, Mayor of Phoenix, Arizona
- John K. Valentine, Lieutenant Governor of Iowa
- Nydia Velázquez (Ramos), U.S. House of Representatives and New York City Council
- Arnold M. Vickers, president of the West Virginia Senate
- Francis E. Walter, U.S. House of Representatives
- Julian Webb, Georgia State Senate and judge of the Georgia Court of Appeals
- Caspar Weinberger (Temple 1959), United States Secretary of Defense and United States Secretary of Health, Education, and Welfare
- Benjamin H. Woodbridge, Virginia House of Delegates
- Chip Woodrum, Virginia House of Delegates

== Sports ==
- Tiffany Gooden (Hammond 1999), professional basketball player in the ABL
- Kenesaw Mountain Landis, 1st Commissioner of Baseball and judge of the United States District Court for the Northern District of Illinois
- George Mikan (Story 1945), professional basketball player for the Minnesota Lakers
- Samuel Huston Thompson, head football coach at Oberlin College, Lehigh University, and the University of Texas at Austin; chairman of the Federal Trade Commission; and assistant U.S. Attorney General
