= Tobias Barry =

American politician (1924–2017)

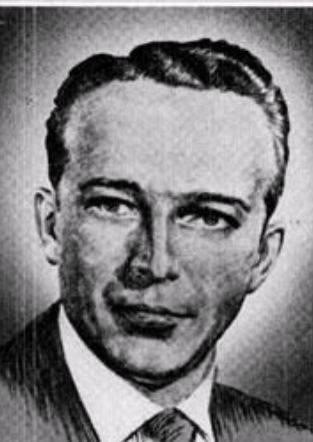

Member of the Illinois House of Representatives
- In office January 1961 – December 1974
- Preceded by: William C. Hollerich
- Succeeded by: Richard Mautino

Personal details
- Born: April 12, 1924 Chicago, Illinois
- Died: April 4, 2017 (aged 92) LaSalle, Illinois
- Party: Democratic
- Spouse: Janet
- Children: Four
- Education: Marquette University (B.Phil.); Notre Dame Law School (J.D.)
- Profession: Attorney

Military service
- Allegiance: United States
- Branch/service: United States Navy
- Years of service: 1942–1945

Tobias G. Barry, Jr. (April 12, 1924 – April 4, 2017) was an American politician in the state of Illinois.

== Early life ==
Barry was born in Chicago on April 12, 1924, to Tobias Barry Sr. who represented the area in the Illinois House of Representatives until his death in 1958. Barry is an alumnus of St. Bede Academy, LaSalle-Peru-Oglesby (LPO) Junior College, Marquette University, and the University of Notre Dame School of Law. His studies were interrupted by three years of service with the United States Navy where he served in the Pacific theatre and participated in the Battle of Iwo Jima and the Battle of Okinawa. Barry passed the bar in 1952 and began practicing law in 1953. He started his own law firm in 1958.

== Legislative career ==
In the 1958 general election, Barry, self-identifying as a Democrat, ran for the Illinois House of Representatives as an independent. After an initial loss to Democratic incumbent William C. Hollerich, a recount put Barry ahead of Hollerich. Ultimately a House Committee opted to keep Hollerich as the elected representative when it met to resolve the elections of the 40th district and 46th district. In 1960, Barry was elected to the Illinois House of Representatives from the 40th district. He was credited with laying the legislative groundwork for the construction of Interstate 39 and a section of it is named in his honor.

== Judicial career ==
In the 1974 general election, he opted to run for a position as an Appellate Judge on the Third Judicial Court in lieu of running for reelection to the House. He was succeeded in the Illinois House by Richard Mautino. In 1990, Barry ran against fellow Appellate Judge and Republican candidate James D. Heiple for the vacancy created by the retirement of Howard C. Ryan. Heiple won by a margin of only 2,827 votes (50.33% to 49.67%). Each candidate won a large plurality in his home county, while the vote in other counties closely followed party lines. Barry retired from the bench in 1994.

During his time on the bench, Barry served on the Administrative Committee and the Illinois Supreme Court's committee on legislative affairs. He also served as Presiding Judge of the Third District and of the Appellate Court's Industrial Commission Division.

In 2001, Governor George Ryan appointed Barry to the Illinois Gaming Board. Later that year, Barry was appointed as one of the commissioners of the Illinois Attorney Registration and Disciplinary Commission. In 2002, Barry was appointed to serve on the Illinois Appellate Court for a two-year term to fill the vacancy left by Thomas Homer's retirement. He retired from law practice in 2006. Barry died April 4, 2017, at age 92.
