= John Paul Stevens =

United States Supreme Court justice from 1975 to 2010

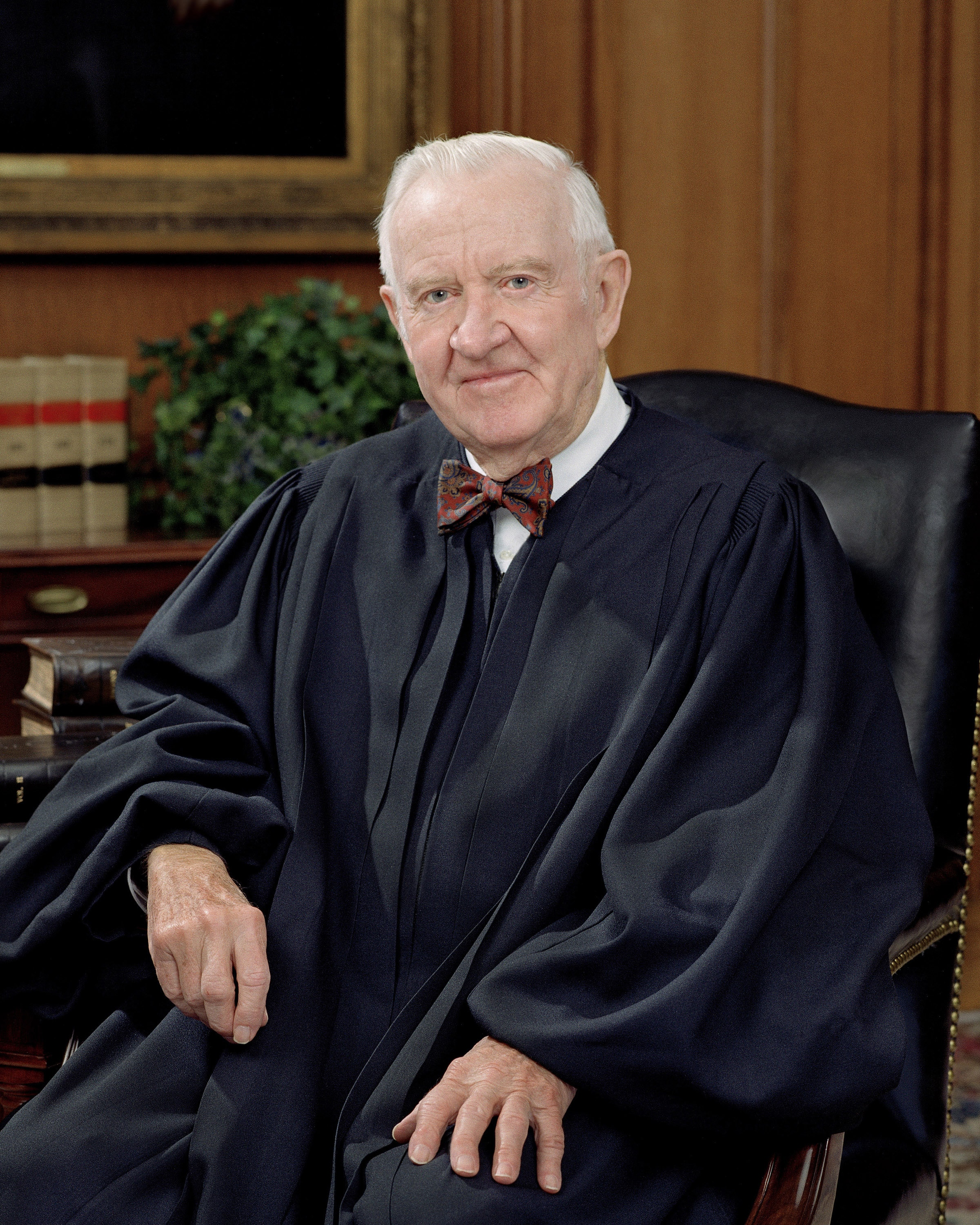
- Official portrait, 2006

Associate Justice of the Supreme Court of the United States
- In office December 19, 1975 – June 29, 2010
- Nominated by: Gerald Ford
- Preceded by: William O. Douglas
- Succeeded by: Elena Kagan

Judge of the United States Court of Appeals for the Seventh Circuit
- In office November 2, 1970 – December 19, 1975
- Nominated by: Richard Nixon
- Preceded by: Elmer Jacob Schnackenberg
- Succeeded by: Harlington Wood Jr.

Personal details
- Born: April 20, 1920 Chicago, Illinois, U.S.
- Died: July 16, 2019 (aged 99) Fort Lauderdale, Florida, U.S.
- Resting place: Arlington National Cemetery
- Party: Republican
- Spouses: Elizabeth Sheeren (m. 1942; div. 1979) Maryan Mulholland Simon (m. 1979; died 2015)
- Children: 4
- Education: University of Chicago (AB); Northwestern University (JD)
- Civilian awards: Presidential Medal of Freedom (2012)

Military service
- Allegiance: United States
- Branch/service: United States Navy
- Years of service: 1942–1945
- Rank: Lieutenant commander
- Battles/wars: World War II; Pacific Theater; Operation Vengeance
- Military awards: Bronze Star; World War II Victory Medal
- John Paul Stevens's voice John Paul Stevens delivers the opinion of the Court in Whalen v. Roe. Recorded February 22, 1977

John Paul Stevens (April 20, 1920 – July 16, 2019) was an American lawyer and jurist who served as an associate justice of the Supreme Court of the United States from 1975 to 2010. He was the second-oldest and fourth-longest-serving justice in U.S. Supreme Court history. At the time of his death in 2019 at age 99, he was the longest-lived Supreme Court justice ever. His long tenure saw him write for the Court on most issues of American law, including civil liberties, the death penalty, government action, and intellectual property. Despite being a registered Republican who throughout his life identified as a conservative, Stevens was considered to have been on the liberal side of the Court at the time of his retirement.

Born in Chicago, Stevens served in the United States Navy during World War II and graduated from Northwestern University School of Law. After clerking for Justice Wiley Rutledge, he co-founded a law firm in Chicago, focusing on antitrust law. In 1970, President Richard Nixon appointed Stevens to the United States Court of Appeals for the Seventh Circuit. Five years later, President Gerald Ford nominated Stevens to the Supreme Court to fill the vacancy caused by the retirement of Justice William O. Douglas. He became the senior associate justice after the retirement of Harry Blackmun in 1994. After the death of Chief Justice William Rehnquist in 2005, Stevens briefly served as acting Chief Justice before the appointment of John Roberts. Stevens retired in 2010 during the administration of President Barack Obama and was succeeded by Elena Kagan.

Stevens's majority opinions in landmark cases include Sony Corp. of America v. Universal City Studios, Inc., Chevron v. Natural Resources Defense Council, Apprendi v. New Jersey, Hamdan v. Rumsfeld, NAACP v. Claiborne Hardware Co., Kelo v. City of New London, Gonzales v. Raich, U.S. Term Limits, Inc. v. Thornton, and Massachusetts v. Environmental Protection Agency. Stevens is also known for his dissents in Texas v. Johnson, Bush v. Gore, Bethel v. Fraser, District of Columbia v. Heller, Printz v. United States, and Citizens United v. FEC.

== Life and career ==
=== Early life and education (1920–1947) ===
Stevens was born on April 20, 1920, in Chicago, Illinois, to a wealthy family from Hyde Park. His paternal grandfather had formed an insurance company and held real estate in Chicago, and his granduncle owned the Chas A. Stevens department store. His father, Ernest James Stevens (1884–1972), was a lawyer who later became an hotelier, owning two hotels: the La Salle and the Stevens Hotel. The family lost ownership of the hotels during the Great Depression, and Stevens's father, grandfather, and an uncle were charged with embezzlement; the Illinois Supreme Court later overturned the conviction, criticizing the prosecution. His mother, Elizabeth Street Stevens (1881–1979), was a high school English teacher. Two of his three older brothers also became lawyers.

A lifelong Chicago Cubs fan, Stevens was 12 when he attended the 1932 World Series between the Yankees and the Cubs in Chicago's Wrigley Field, in which Babe Ruth allegedly called his shot. Stevens later recalled: "Ruth did point to the center-field scoreboard. And he did hit the ball out of the park after he pointed with his bat, so it really happened." He also had the opportunity to meet several notable people of the era, including the famed aviators Amelia Earhart and Charles Lindbergh, the latter of whom gave him a caged dove as a gift.

The family lived in Hyde Park, and Stevens attended the University of Chicago Laboratory Schools where he graduated in 1937. He later attended the University of Chicago, where he majored in English, was inducted into Phi Beta Kappa, and graduated with highest honors in 1941. While in college, Stevens also became a member of the Psi Upsilon fraternity.

He began work on his master's degree in English at the university in 1941 but soon decided to join the United States Navy. He enlisted on December 6, 1941, one day before the attack on Pearl Harbor, and served as an intelligence officer in the Pacific Theater from 1942 to 1945. Stevens was awarded a Bronze Star for his service in the codebreaking team whose work led to the downing of Japanese Admiral Yamamoto's plane in 1943's Operation Vengeance. He also earned the World War II Victory Medal and later received the highest United States civilian award, the Presidential Medal of Freedom, from Barack Obama.

Stevens married Elizabeth Jane Shereen in June 1942. Divorcing her in 1979, he married Maryan Mulholland Simon that December; that marriage lasted until Simon's death in 2015 following complications from hip surgery. He had four children: John Joseph (who died of cancer in 1996), Kathryn (who died in 2018), Elizabeth, and Susan.

With the end of World War II, Stevens returned to Illinois, intending to return to his studies in English, but was persuaded by his brother Richard, who was a lawyer, to attend law school. Stevens enrolled in the Northwestern University School of Law in 1945, with the G.I. Bill paying most of his tuition. Stevens graduated in 1947 ranked first in his class with a J.D. magna cum laude, having earned the highest GPA in the school's history.

=== Legal career, 1947–1970 ===
After receiving high recommendations from several Northwestern faculty members, Stevens served as a law clerk to Supreme Court justice Wiley Rutledge during the 1947–48 term.

Following his clerkship, Stevens returned to Chicago and joined the law firm of Poppenhusen, Johnston, Thompson & Raymond (now Jenner & Block). Stevens was admitted to the bar in 1949. He determined that he would not stay long at the Poppenhusen firm after being docked his pay for the day he took off to travel to Springfield to swear his oath of admission. During his time at the firm, Stevens began his practice in antitrust law.

In 1951, he returned to Washington, DC, to serve as associate counsel to the Subcommittee on the Study of Monopoly Power of the Judiciary Committee of the U.S. House of Representatives. During this time, the subcommittee worked on several highly publicized investigations in many industries, most notably Major League Baseball.

In 1952, Stevens returned to Chicago and, together with two other young lawyers with whom he had worked at Poppenhusen, Johnston, Thompson & Raymond, formed his own law firm: Rothschild, Stevens, Barry & Myers. It soon developed into a successful practice, with Stevens continuing to focus on antitrust cases. His growing expertise in antitrust law led to an invitation to teach the "Competition and Monopoly" course at the University of Chicago Law School, and from 1953 to 1955, he was a member of the Attorney General's National Committee to Study Antitrust Laws. At the same time, Stevens was making a name for himself as a first-rate antitrust litigator and was involved in a number of trials. He was widely regarded by colleagues as an extraordinarily capable and impressive lawyer with a fantastic memory and analytical ability, and authored a number of influential works on antitrust law.

In 1969, the Greenberg Commission, appointed by the Illinois Supreme Court to investigate Sherman Skolnick's corruption allegations leveled at former chief justice Ray Klingbiel and then-current chief justice Roy Solfisburg, named Stevens as its counsel, meaning that he essentially served as the commission's special prosecutor. The commission was widely thought to be a whitewash, but Stevens proved them wrong by vigorously prosecuting the justices, eventually forcing them from office. As a result of the prominence he gained during the Greenberg Commission, Stevens became the second vice president of the Chicago Bar Association in 1970.

=== Judicial career, 1970–2010 ===
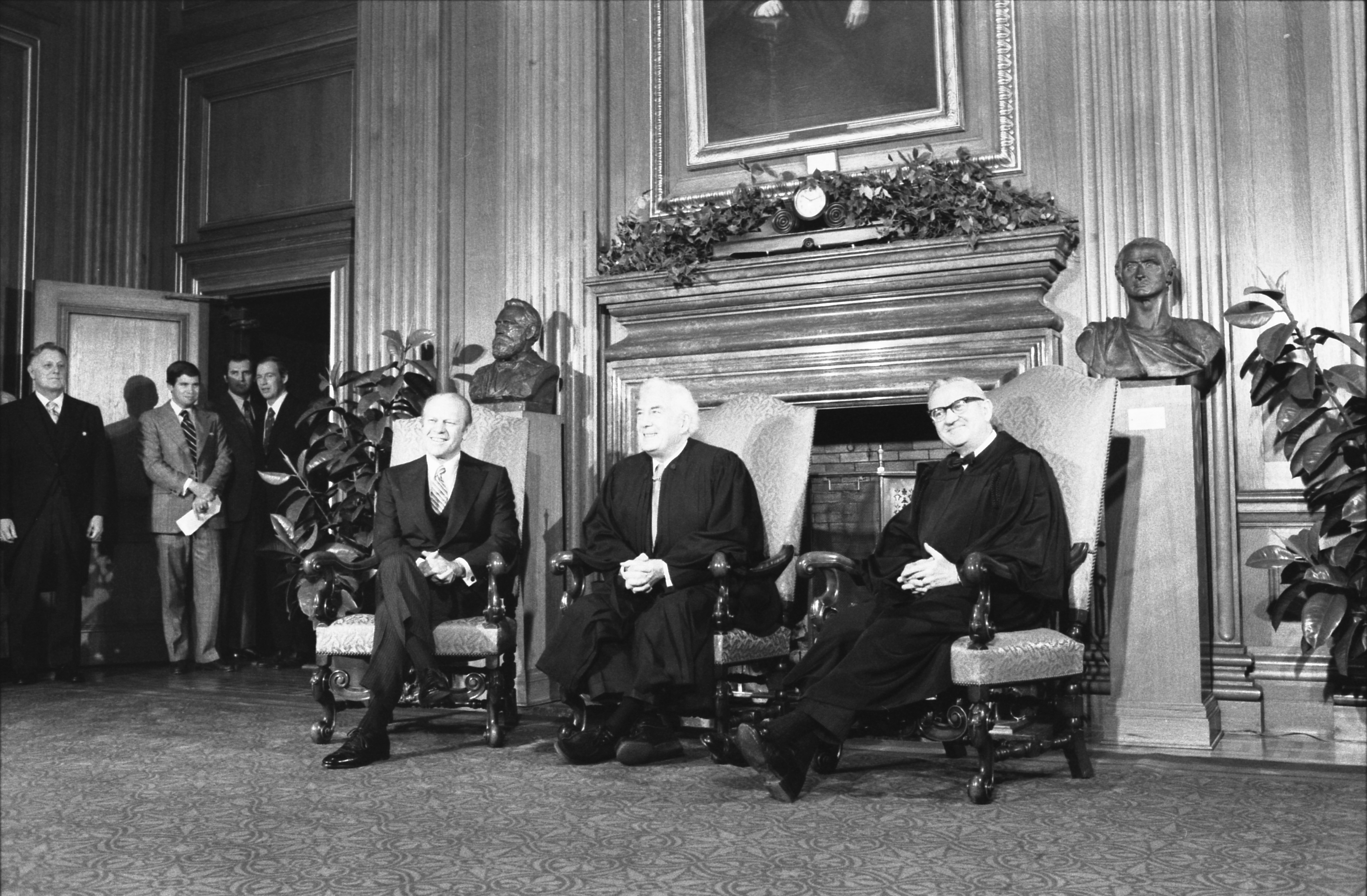
Stevens with President Gerald Ford (left) and Chief Justice Warren E. Burger (right) on December 19, 1975, the day he took his seat on the Supreme Court

Stevens's role in the Greenberg Commission catapulted him to prominence and was largely responsible for President Richard Nixon's decision to appoint Stevens as a judge of the United States Court of Appeals for the Seventh Circuit in 1970. His nomination was put forth by a former University of Chicago classmate, Illinois Senator Charles H. Percy.

On November 28, 1975, President Gerald Ford nominated Stevens as an associate justice of the United States Supreme Court, to a seat vacated by William O. Douglas. Again, it was Percy who suggested Stevens; the nomination was also strongly supported by Attorney General Edward Levi, former president of the University of Chicago. He was sworn into office on December 19, 1975, after being confirmed 98–0 two days earlier.

When Harry Blackmun retired in 1994, Stevens became the senior associate justice and thus assumed the administrative duties of the Court whenever the post of Chief Justice of the United States was vacant or the chief justice was unable to perform his duties. Stevens performed the duties of chief justice in September 2005, between the death of Chief Justice William Rehnquist and the swearing-in of his replacement, John Roberts, and presided over oral arguments on a number of occasions when the chief justice was ill or recused. Also in September 2005, Stevens was honored with a symposium by Fordham Law School for his 30 years on the Supreme Court, and President Ford wrote a letter stating his continued pride in appointing him.

In a 2005 speech, Stevens stressed the importance of "learning on the job"; for example, during his tenure on the Court, Stevens changed his views on affirmative action (which he initially opposed), as well as on other issues. President Ford praised Stevens in 2005: "He is serving his nation well, with dignity, intellect and without partisan political concerns."

Additionally, he actively participated in questioning during oral arguments. Stevens was elected a fellow of the American Academy of Arts and Sciences in 2008. That same year he was elected to the American Philosophical Society.

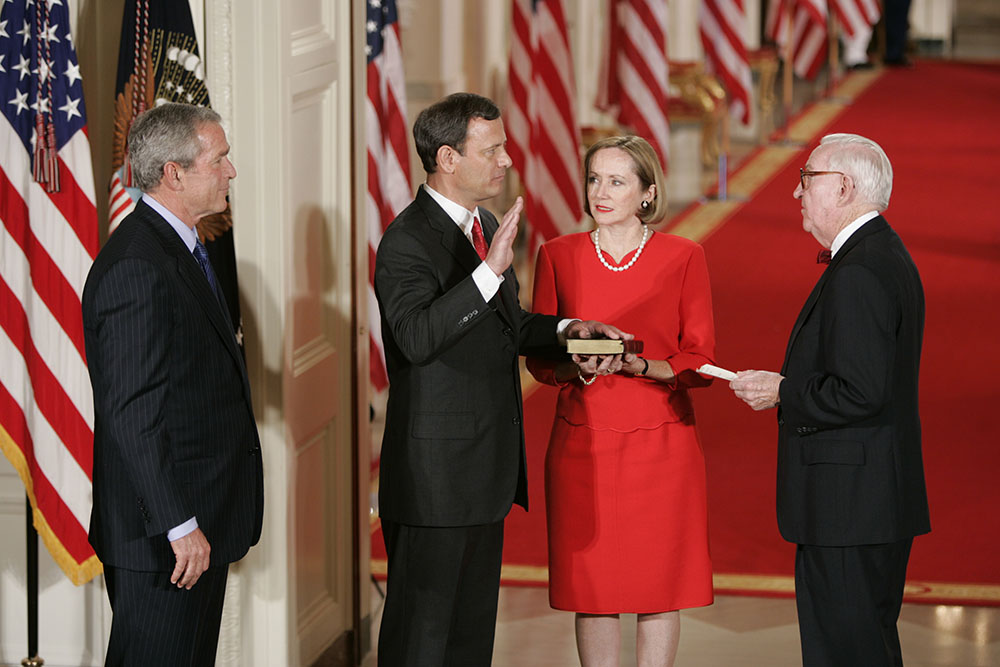
Stevens (right) swears in John Roberts as Chief Justice on September 29, 2005, while Roberts' wife Jane and President George W. Bush look on. Ceremony in the East Room of the White House.

On January 20, 2009, Stevens administered the oath of office to Vice President Joe Biden at Biden's request. It is customary for the vice president to be inaugurated by the person of their choice.

On April 9, 2010, Stevens announced his intention to retire from the Supreme Court; he subsequently retired on June 29 of that year. Stevens said that his decision to retire from the Court was initially triggered when he stumbled on several sentences when delivering his oral dissent in the 2010 landmark case Citizens United v. FEC. Stevens said "I took that as a warning sign that maybe I've been around longer than I should."

=== Tenure and age ===
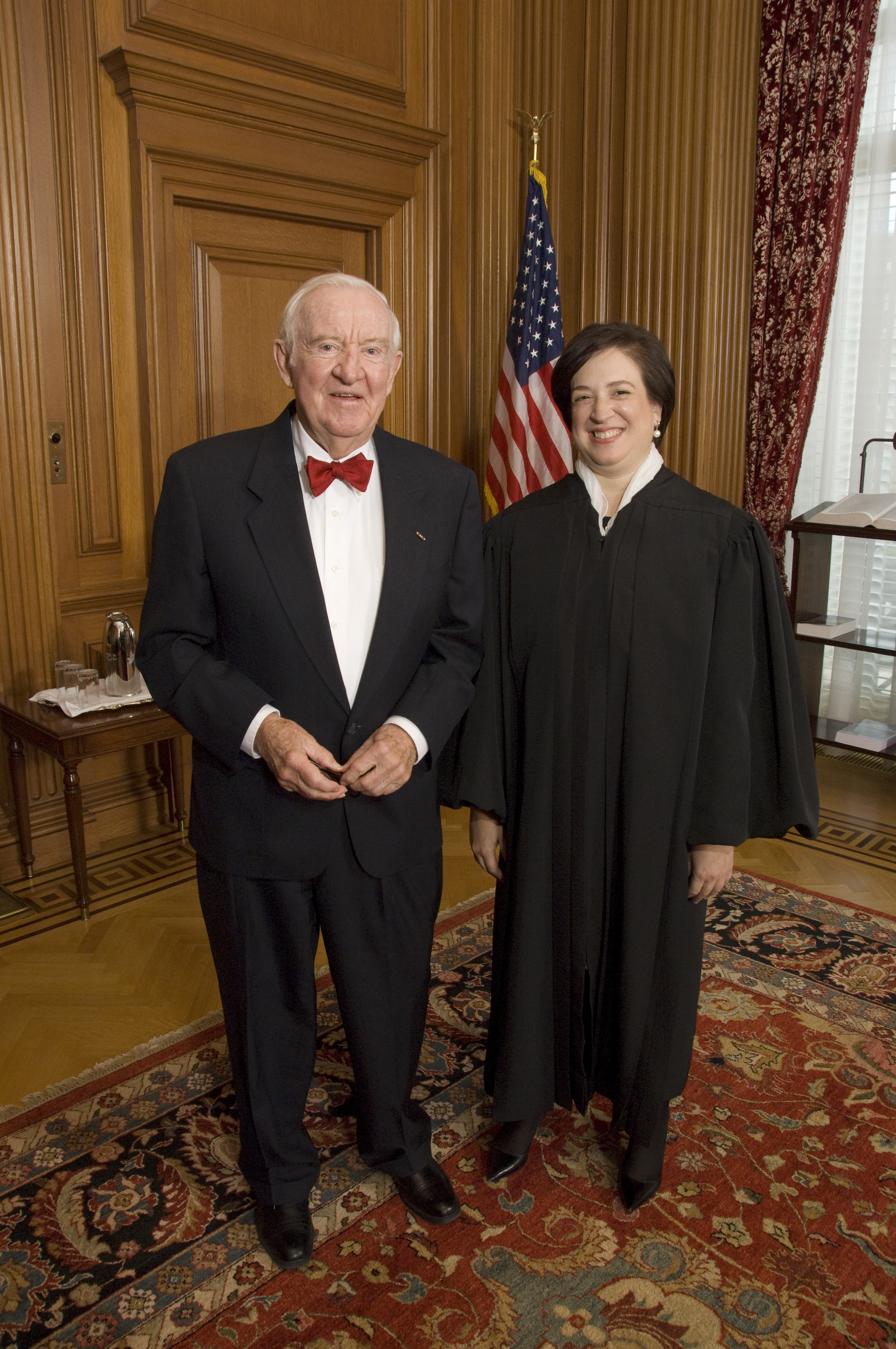
Stevens with his successor Elena Kagan in 2010

Stevens retired on June 29, 2010, as the third-longest-serving justice in the history of the Supreme Court with 34 years and six months of service and just three days short of tying the tenure of the second-longest serving justice in history, Stephen Johnson Field, who had retired on December 1, 1897. The longest-serving justice is Stevens's immediate predecessor, Justice William O. Douglas, who served 36 1/2 years and retired on November 12, 1975. He is now the 4th longest serving justice in history, being surpassed by Clarence Thomas in 2026. He was the last sitting Supreme Court justice to serve on the Burger Court.

Stevens was also the second-oldest justice, at age 90 years and two months at retirement, behind Oliver Wendell Holmes Jr. who retired at the age of 90 years and 10 months on January 12, 1932. On July 23, 2015, Stevens became the longest-lived retired justice, surpassing Stanley Forman Reed who died at age 95 years and 93 days on April 2, 1980.

On June 26, 2015, Stevens attended the Court's announcement of the opinion in Obergefell v. Hodges, in which the Court ruled 5–4 that recognition of same-sex marriage is protected under the Constitution's Fourteenth Amendment.

=== Political affiliation ===
When he was appointed to the Supreme Court, Stevens was a registered Republican. In September 2007, he was a sitting Justice when he was asked if he still considered himself a Republican. Stevens replied, "That's the kind of issue I shouldn't comment on, either in private or in public." Stevens was generally considered to be one of the last-surviving Rockefeller Republicans. Judge Abner Mikva, a close friend of Stevens, said that as a judge, he refused to discuss politics. Mikva stated, "He was more particular about it than a lot of them."

In October 2018, Stevens said that Brett Kavanaugh's performance during his confirmation hearings should disqualify him from serving on the Supreme Court, citing the potential for political bias. Shortly before Stevens' death in 2019, he said he was "not a fan" of Donald Trump, and when asked about Trump's effect on the country, he stated "I don't think it's been favorable."

== Judicial philosophy ==
On the United States Court of Appeals for the Seventh Circuit, Stevens had a moderately conservative record. Early in his tenure on the Supreme Court, Stevens had a relatively moderate voting record. He voted to reinstate capital punishment in the United States and opposed race-based admissions programs, such as the program at issue in Regents of the University of California v. Bakke, 438 U.S. 265 (1978). However, on the more conservative Rehnquist Court, Stevens joined the more liberal justices on issues such as abortion rights, gay rights and federalism. His Segal–Cover score, a measure of the perceived liberalism/conservatism of Court members when they joined the Court, places him squarely on the conservative side of the Court. However, a 2003 statistical analysis of Supreme Court voting patterns found Stevens the most liberal member of the Court. President Ford expressed no regrets about Stevens's drift toward liberalism, writing in a 2005 letter to USA Today, "Justice Stevens has made me, and our fellow citizens, proud of my three decade old decision to appoint him to the Supreme Court."

Stevens's jurisprudence has usually been characterized as idiosyncratic. Stevens, unlike most justices, reviewed petitions for certiorari within his chambers instead of having his law clerks participate as part of the cert pool and usually wrote the first drafts of his opinions himself; when asked to explain why, he said: "I'm the one hired to do the job." He further explained that he continued to learn about cases and legal theories as he drafted his opinions and re-evaluated his positions on cases while writing.

He was not an originalist (such as Antonin Scalia) nor a pragmatist (such as Justice Stephen Breyer), nor did he pronounce himself a cautious liberal (such as Justice Ruth Bader Ginsburg). He was considered part of the liberal bloc of the Court starting in the mid-1980s, and was dubbed the "chief justice of the liberal Supreme Court", though he publicly called himself a judicial conservative in 2007.

In Cleburne v. Cleburne Living Center, 473 U.S. 432 (1985), Stevens argued against the Supreme Court's famous "strict scrutiny" doctrine for laws involving "suspect classifications", putting forth the view that all classifications should be evaluated using the "rational basis" test as to whether they could have been enacted by an "impartial legislature". In Burnham v. Superior Court of California, 495 U.S. 604 (1990), Stevens demonstrated his independence with a characteristically pithy concurrence.

Stevens was once an impassioned critic of affirmative action; in addition to the 1978 decision in Bakke, he dissented in the case of Fullilove v. Klutznick, 448 U.S. 448 (1980), which upheld a minority set-aside program. He shifted his position over the years and voted to uphold the affirmative action program at the University of Michigan Law School challenged in Grutter v. Bollinger, 539 U.S. 306 (2003).

Stevens wrote the majority opinion in Hamdan v. Rumsfeld in 2006, in which he held that certain military commissions had been improperly constituted. He also wrote a lengthy dissenting opinion in Citizens United v. FEC, arguing the majority should not make a decision so broad that it would overturn precedents set in three previous Supreme Court cases. When reviewing his career at the Supreme Court in his 2019 book, The Making of a Justice: Reflections on My First 94 Years, Stevens lamented being unable to persuade his colleagues against the decision in Citizens United, which he described as "a disaster for our election law."

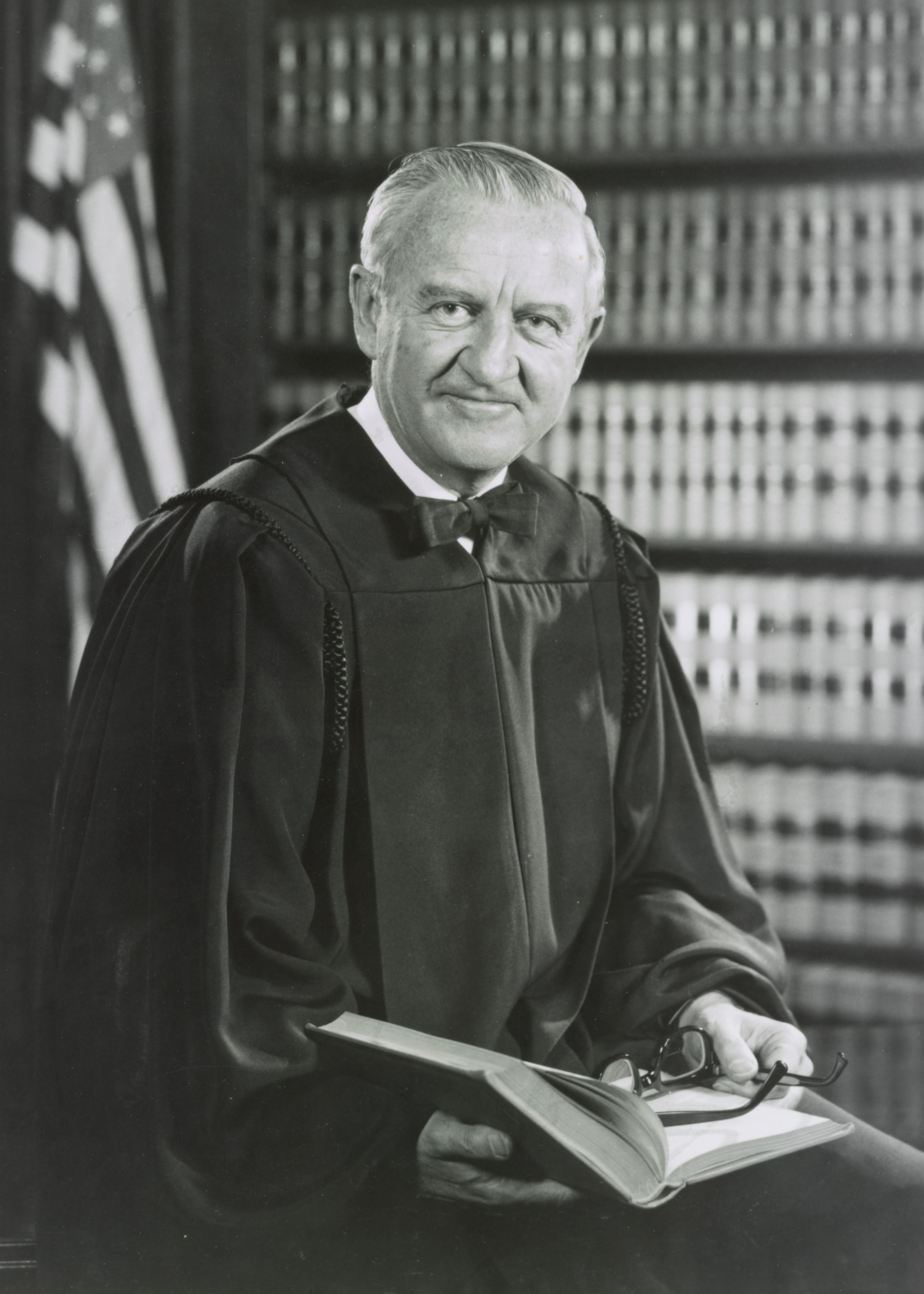
Stevens's official Supreme Court portrait, 1976

=== Freedom of speech ===
Stevens's views on obscenity under the First Amendment changed over the years. He was initially quite critical of constitutional protection for obscenity, rejecting a challenge to Detroit zoning ordinances that barred adult theaters in designated areas in Young v. American Mini Theatres, 427 U.S. 50 (1976), ("[E]ven though we recognize that the First Amendment will not tolerate the total suppression of erotic materials that have some arguably artistic value, it is manifest that society's interest in protecting this type of expression is of a wholly different, and lesser, magnitude than the interest in untrammeled political debate"), but later in his tenure adhered firmly to a libertarian free speech approach on obscenity issues, voting to strike down a federal law regulating online obscene content considered "harmful to minors" in ACLU v. Ashcroft, 535 U.S. 564 (2002). In his dissenting opinion, Stevens argued that, while "[a]s a parent, grandparent, and great-grandparent", he endorsed the legislative goal of protecting children from pornography "without reservation", "[a]s a judge, I must confess to a growing sense of unease when the interest in protecting children from prurient materials is invoked as a justification for using criminal regulation of speech as a substitute for, or a simple backup to, adult oversight of children's viewing."

Perhaps the most personal and unusual feature of his jurisprudence was his continual referencing of World War II in his opinions. For example, Stevens, a World War II veteran, was visibly angered by William Kunstler's flippant defense of flag-burning in oral argument in Texas v. Johnson, 491 U.S. 397 (1989) and voted to uphold a prohibition on flag-burning against a First Amendment argument. Stevens wrote, "The ideas of liberty and equality have been an irresistible force in motivating leaders like Patrick Henry, Susan B. Anthony, and Abraham Lincoln, schoolteachers like Nathan Hale and Booker T. Washington, the Philippine Scouts who fought at Bataan, and the soldiers who scaled the bluff at Omaha Beach. If those ideas are worth fighting for—and our history demonstrates that they are—it cannot be true that the flag that uniquely symbolizes their power is not itself worthy of protection from unnecessary desecration."

Stevens generally supported students' right to free speech in public schools. He wrote sharply-worded dissents in Bethel v. Fraser, 478 U.S. 675 (1986) and Morse v. Frederick, 551 U.S. 393 (2007), two decisions that restricted students' freedom of speech. However, he joined the Court's ruling on Hazelwood v. Kuhlmeier, 484 U.S. 260 (1988) which upheld a principal's censorship of a student newspaper.

=== Establishment Clause ===
In Wallace v. Jaffree, 472 U.S. 38 (1985), striking down an Alabama statute mandating a minute of silence in public schools "for meditation or silent prayer", Stevens wrote the opinion for a majority that included justices William Brennan, Thurgood Marshall, Harry Blackmun, and Lewis Powell. He affirmed that the Establishment Clause is binding on the States via the Fourteenth Amendment, and that: "Just as the right to speak and the right to refrain from speaking are complementary components of a broader concept of individual freedom of mind, so also the individual's freedom to choose his own creed is the counterpart of his right to refrain from accepting the creed of the majority. At one time, it was thought that this right merely proscribed the preference of one Christian sect over another, but would not require equal respect for the conscience of the infidel, the atheist, or the adherent of a non-Christian faith such as Islam or Judaism. But when the underlying principle has been examined in the crucible of litigation, the Court has unambiguously concluded that the individual freedom of conscience protected by the First Amendment embraces the right to select any religious faith or none at all."

Stevens wrote a dissent in Van Orden v. Perry, 545 U.S. 677 (2005), in which he was joined by Justice Ruth Bader Ginsburg; he argued that the ten commandments displayed in the Texas Capitol grounds transmitted the message: "This State endorses the divine code of the 'Judeo-Christian' God." The Establishment Clause, he wrote, "at the very least ... has created a strong presumption against the display of religious symbols on public property", and that it "demands religious neutrality—Government may not exercise preference for one religious faith over another". This includes a prohibition against enacting laws or imposing requirements that aid all religions as against unbelievers, or aid religions that are based on a belief in the existence of God against those founded on different principles.

=== Commerce clause and states' rights ===
When interpreting the Interstate Commerce Clause, Stevens consistently sided with the federal government. He dissented in United States v. Lopez, 514 U.S. 549 (1995) and United States v. Morrison, 529 U.S. 598 (2000), two prominent cases in which the Rehnquist court changed direction by holding that Congress had exceeded its constitutional power under the Commerce Clause. He then authored Gonzales v. Raich, 545 U.S. 1 (2005), which permits the federal government to arrest, prosecute, and imprison patients who use medical marijuana regardless of whether such use is legally permissible under state law.

=== Fourth Amendment ===
Stevens had a generally libertarian voting record on the Fourth Amendment, which deals with search and seizure. Stevens authored the majority opinion in Arizona v. Gant, which held that "police may search a vehicle incident to a recent occupant's arrest only if the arrestee is within reaching distance of the compartment at the time of the search or it is reasonable to believe the vehicle contains evidence of the offense of arrest." He dissented in New Jersey v. T. L. O., 469 U.S. 325 (1985) and Vernonia School District 47J v. Acton, 515 U.S. 646 (1995), both involving searches in schools. He was a dissenter in Oliver v. United States, 466 U.S. 170 (1984), a case relating to the open-fields doctrine. However, in United States v. Montoya De Hernandez, 473 U.S. 531 (1985), he sided with the government, and he was the author of United States v. Ross, 456 U.S. 798 (1982), which permits the police to search closed containers found in the course of searching a vehicle. He also authored the dissent in Kyllo v. United States, 533 U.S. 27 (2001), which held that the use of thermal imaging requires a warrant.

In a 2009 paper, Ward Farnsworth argued that Stevens's "dissents against type" (in Stevens's case, votes in dissent in favor of the government's position and against the accused, such as the one in Kyllo) suggest that while Stevens "[believed] strongly in laying out resources for the sake of accuracy and opportunities to protest an unfair trial, [he is] not nearly as concerned about restraining the government at the front end of the process, when it is gathering evidence—for the costs of invaded rights then are to liberty rather than to accuracy".

=== Death penalty ===
Stevens joined the majority in Gregg v. Georgia, 428 U.S. 153 (1976), which overruled Furman v. Georgia, 408 U.S. 238 (1972) and again allowed the use of the death penalty in the United States. In later cases such as Thompson v. Oklahoma, 487 U.S. 815 (1988) and Atkins v. Virginia, 536 U.S. 304 (2002), Stevens held that the Constitution forbids the use of the death penalty in certain circumstances. Stevens opposed using the death penalty on juvenile offenders; he dissented in Stanford v. Kentucky, 492 U.S. 361 (1989) and joined the Court's majority in Roper v. Simmons, 543 U.S. 551 (2005), overturning Stanford. In Baze v. Rees, 553 U.S. 35 (2008), Stevens voted with the majority in upholding Kentucky's method of lethal injection, because he felt bound by stare decisis. However, he opined that "state-sanctioned killing is ... becoming more and more anachronistic" and agreed with former justice Byron White's assertion that "the needless extinction of life with only marginal contributions to any discernible social or public purposes ... would be patently excessive", in violation of the Eighth Amendment (quoting from White's concurrence in Furman). Soon after his vote in Baze, Stevens told a Sixth Circuit conference that one of the drugs (pancuronium bromide) in the three-drug cocktail used by Kentucky to execute death row inmates is prohibited in Kentucky for euthanizing animals. He questioned whether Kentucky Derby second-place finisher Eight Belles died more humanely than those on death row. He explained that his death penalty decisions were influenced, in part, by an increasing awareness through DNA testing of the fallibility of death sentences, and the fact that death-qualified juries come with a set of biases. Stevens, at the time of his opinion in Baze, was one of four justices—the others being Brennan, Marshall, and Blackmun—who had concluded that post-Gregg capital punishment is unconstitutional under the Eighth Amendment. After his retirement, Stevens stated that his vote in Gregg was the only vote he regretted.

== Other significant opinions ==
=== Chevron ===
Stevens authored the majority opinion in Chevron U.S.A., Inc. v. Natural Resources Defense Council, Inc., 467 U.S. 837 (1984). The opinion stands for how courts review administrative agencies' interpretations of their organic statutes. If the organic statute unambiguously expresses the will of Congress, the court enforces the legislature's intent. If the statute is unclear (and is thus thought to reflect a Congressional delegation of power to the agency to interpret the statute), and the agency interpretation has the force of law, courts defer to an agency's interpretation of the statute unless that interpretation is deemed to be "arbitrary, capricious, or manifestly contrary to the statute". This doctrine is now generally referred to as "Chevron deference" among legal practitioners.

Unlike some other members of the Court, Stevens was consistently willing to find organic statutes unambiguous and thus overturn agency interpretations of those statutes. (See his majority opinion in Immigration and Naturalization Service v. Cardoza-Fonseca, 480 U.S. 421 (1987), and his dissent in Young v. Community Nutrition Institute, 476 U.S. 974 (1986).) Although Chevron has come to stand for the proposition of deference to agency interpretations, Stevens, the author of the opinion, was less willing to defer to agencies than the rest of his colleagues on the Court.

=== Crawford v. Marion County Election Board ===
Stevens wrote the lead opinion in Crawford v. Marion County Election Board, a case where the Court upheld the right of states to require an official photo identification card to help ensure that only citizens vote. Chief Justice John Roberts and Justice Anthony Kennedy joined this opinion, and justices Antonin Scalia, Clarence Thomas, and Samuel Alito agreed with them on the outcome. Edward B. Foley, an election law expert at Ohio State University, said the Stevens opinion might represent an effort to "depoliticize election law cases." Stevens's vote in Crawford and his agreement with the Court's conservative majority in two other cases during the 2007–2008 term (Medellin v. Texas, 552 U.S. 491 (2008) and Baze v. Rees) led University of Oklahoma law professor and former Stevens clerk Joseph Thai to wonder if Stevens was "tacking back a little bit toward the center."

Despite his vote in Crawford, Stevens expressed disagreement with Shelby County v. Holder, a case that struck down preclearance requirements of the Voting Rights Act.

=== Bush v. Gore ===
In Bush v. Gore, 531 U.S. 98 (2000), Stevens wrote a scathing dissent on the Court's ruling to stay the recount of votes in Florida during the 2000 presidential election. He believed that the holding displayed "an unstated lack of confidence in the impartiality and capacity of the state judges who would make the critical decisions if the vote count were to proceed". He continued, "The endorsement of that position by the majority of this Court can only lend credence to the most cynical appraisal of the work of judges throughout the land. It is confidence in the men and women who administer the judicial system that is the true backbone of the rule of law. Time will one day heal the wound to that confidence that will be inflicted by today's decision. One thing, however, is certain. Although we may never know with complete certainty the identity of the winner of this year's presidential election, the identity of the loser is perfectly clear. It is the Nation's confidence in the judge as an impartial guardian of the rule of law."

=== Second Amendment ===
Stevens wrote the primary dissenting opinion in District of Columbia v. Heller 554 U.S. 570 (2008), a landmark case which addressed the interpretation of the Second Amendment and the right to keep and bear arms. Heller struck down provisions of the Firearms Control Regulations Act of 1975 and held that the Second Amendment protects an individual's right to possess a firearm unconnected with service in a militia for traditionally lawful purposes, such as self-defense within the home. His dissent was joined by justices David Souter, Ruth Bader Ginsburg, and Stephen Breyer; the majority opinion was written by Justice Antonin Scalia.

Stevens stated that the Court's judgment was "a strained and unpersuasive reading" which overturned longstanding precedent, and that the Court had "bestowed a dramatic upheaval in the law." Stevens also stated that the amendment was notable for the "omission of any statement of purpose related to the right to use firearms for hunting or personal self-defense" which was present in the Declarations of Rights of Pennsylvania and Vermont. Stevens' dissent seems to rest on four main points of disagreement: that the Founders would have made the individual right aspect of the Second Amendment express if that was what was intended; that the "militia" preamble and exact phrase "to keep and bear arms" demands the conclusion that the Second Amendment touches on state militia service only; that many lower courts' later "collective-right" reading of the Miller decision constitutes stare decisis, which may only be overturned at great peril; and that the Court has not considered gun-control laws (e.g., the National Firearms Act) unconstitutional. The dissent concludes, "The Court would have us believe that over 200 years ago, the Framers made a choice to limit the tools available to elected officials wishing to regulate civilian uses of weapons. ... I could not possibly conclude that the Framers made such a choice."

On March 27, 2018, days after the March for Our Lives demonstrations in the wake of the Stoneman Douglas High School shooting, described by many media outlets as a possible tipping point for gun control legislation, Stevens wrote an essay for The New York Times, stating that the demonstrators should be demanding the outright repeal of the Second Amendment. He wrote:

Concern that a national standing army might pose a threat to the security of the separate states led to the adoption of that amendment, which provides that "a well regulated militia, being necessary to the security of a free state, the right of the people to keep and bear arms, shall not be infringed." Today that concern is a relic of the 18th century.

== Books ==
External videos
- Q&A interview with Stevens about Five Chiefs, October 9, 2011, C-SPAN

In 2011, Stevens published a memoir entitled Five Chiefs: A Supreme Court Memoir, which detailed his legal career during the tenure of five of the Supreme Court's chief justices. In Five Chiefs, Stevens recounts his time as a law clerk during the tenure of Chief Justice Vinson; his experiences as a private attorney during the Warren era; and his experience while serving as an associate justice on the Burger, Rehnquist, and Roberts Courts.

In 2014, Stevens published Six Amendments: How and Why We Should Change the Constitution, where he proposed that six amendments should be added to the U.S. Constitution to address political gerrymandering, anti-commandeering, campaign finance reform, capital punishment, gun violence, and sovereign immunity.

In 2019, at age 99 and shortly before his death, Stevens published The Making of a Justice: Reflections on My First 94 Years.

== Personal life ==
Stevens married Elizabeth Sheeren in 1942. He was on the high court when the couple divorced thirty-seven years later in 1979. Later that same year, he married Maryan Simon; they remained married until her death in 2015. Stevens had four children, two of whom predeceased him. Stevens was a Protestant, and upon his retirement, the Supreme Court had no Protestant members for the first time in its history. He was one of only two Supreme Court justices who divorced while on the Court—the first was William O. Douglas, whom he coincidentally succeeded as an associate justice. Stevens was also an avid bridge player and belonged to the Pompano Duplicate Bridge Club Florida. Stevens was a private pilot who owned and flew a Cessna 172 with the registration number N1688F for almost two decades.

=== Death ===
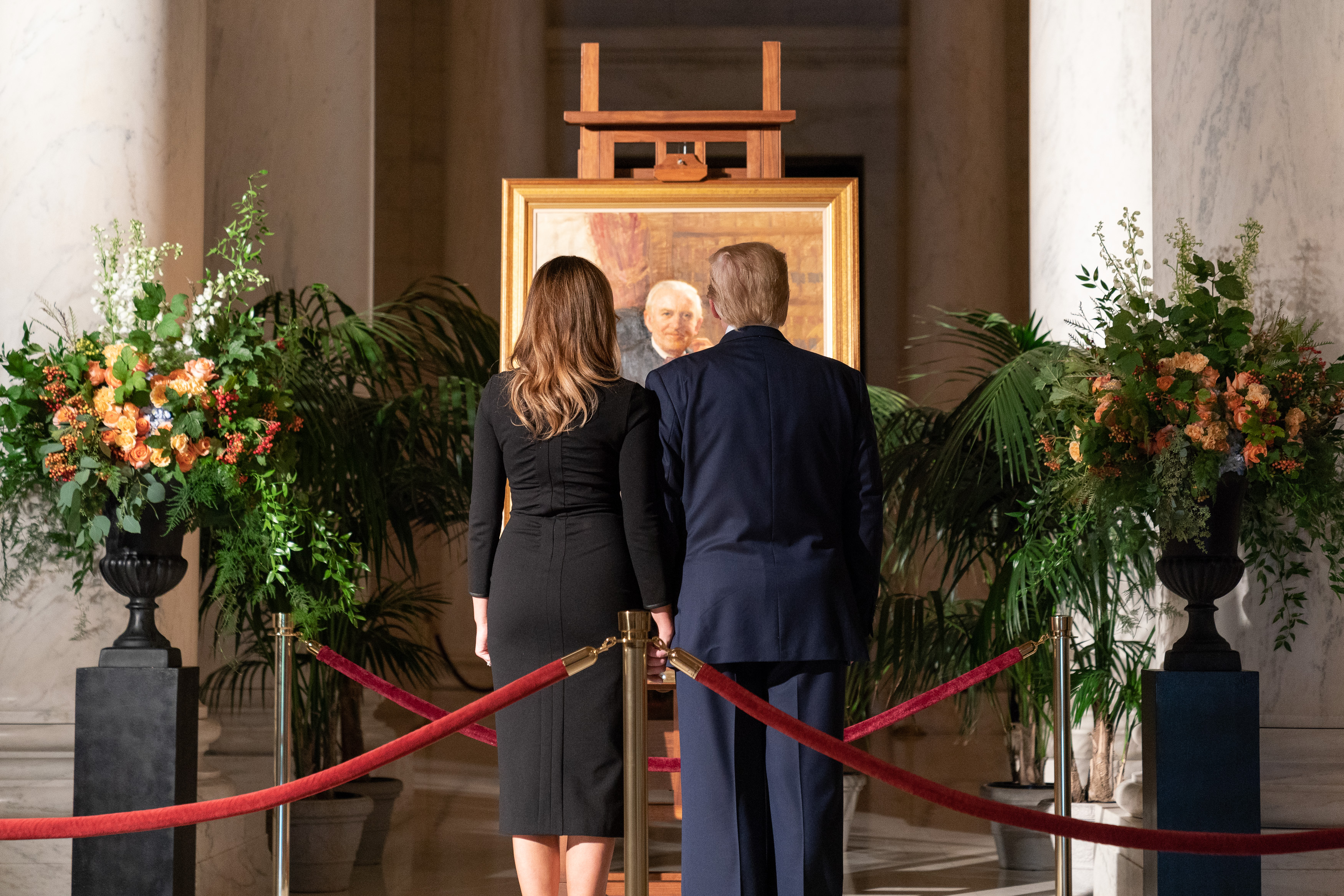
President Donald Trump and First Lady Melania Trump at Stevens's funeral

On July 16, 2019, Stevens died at the age of 99 at a hospital in Fort Lauderdale, Florida, from complications of a stroke. He received hospice care and was with his two surviving children, Elizabeth and Susan, when he died.

He lay in repose at the Supreme Court on July 22, 2019, before a planned burial at Arlington National Cemetery the following day. The service was attended by all the justices on the court, as well as retired justices Anthony Kennedy and David Souter. President Donald Trump ordered flags to fly at half-staff as a mark of respect on Tuesday, July 23, until sundown.

== In popular culture ==
Stevens was portrayed by the actor William Schallert in the 2008 film Recount. He was portrayed by David Grant Wright in two episodes of Boston Legal in which Alan Shore and Denny Crane appear before the Supreme Court. Stevens appeared in interviews in two episodes of Ken Burns's 2011 PBS documentary miniseries Prohibition, recalling his childhood in Chicago in the 1920s and 30s.

According to an April 2009 article in The Wall Street Journal, Stevens "rendered an opinion on who wrote Shakespeare's plays," proclaiming himself an Oxfordian. That is, he believes the works ascribed to William Shakespeare actually were written by Edward de Vere, 17th Earl of Oxford. As a result, he was appointed Oxfordian of the Year by the Shakespeare Oxford Society. According to the article, Antonin Scalia and Harry Blackmun shared Stevens's belief.

Stevens was 12 years old when he was at Wrigley Field for the 1932 World Series game at which Babe Ruth hit his "called shot" home run. Eighty-four years later, he attended Game 4 of the 2016 World Series, also at Wrigley Field, wearing a red bowtie with a Chicago Cubs jacket.

== See also ==
- List of United States federal judges by longevity of service
- List of justices of the Supreme Court of the United States
- List of law clerks for the third seat of the Supreme Court of the United States
- List of law clerks for the fourth seat of the Supreme Court of the United States
- List of United States Supreme Court justices by time in office
- United States Supreme Court cases during the Burger Court
- United States Supreme Court cases during the Rehnquist Court
- United States Supreme Court cases during the Roberts Court

Legal offices
Preceded by Elmer Jacob Schnackenberg	Judge of the United States Court of Appeals for the Seventh Circuit; 1970–1975	Succeeded by Harlington Wood Jr.
Preceded by William O. Douglas	Associate Justice of the Supreme Court of the United States; 1975–2010	Succeeded by Elena Kagan
