= United States v. Montoya De Hernandez =

- Supreme Court of the United States

Argued April 24, 1985 Decided July 1, 1985
- Full case name: United States v. Montoya De Hernandez
- Citations: 473 U.S. 531 (more) 105 S. Ct. 3304; 87 L. Ed. 2d 381; 1985 U.S. LEXIS 120

Case history
- Prior: 731 F.2d 1369 (9th Cir. 1984)

Holding
- The detention of a traveler at the border, beyond the scope of a routine customs search and inspection, is justified at its inception if customs agents, considering all the facts surrounding the traveler and her trip, reasonably suspect that the traveler is smuggling contraband in her alimentary canal; here, the facts, and their rational inferences, known to the customs officials clearly supported a reasonable suspicion that respondent was an alimentary canal smuggler.

Court membership
- Chief Justice Warren E. Burger Associate Justices William J. Brennan Jr. · Byron White; Thurgood Marshall · Harry Blackmun; Lewis F. Powell Jr. · William Rehnquist; John P. Stevens · Sandra Day O'Connor

Case opinions
- Majority: Rehnquist, joined by Burger, White, Blackmun, Powell, O'Connor
- Concurrence: Stevens
- Dissent: Brennan, joined by Marshall

Laws applied
- U.S. Const. amend. IV

United States v. Montoya De Hernandez, 473 U.S. 531 (1985), was a U.S. Supreme Court case regarding the Fourth Amendment's border search exception and balloon swallowing.

== Background ==
Rose Elvira Montoya de Hernandez entered the United States at Los Angeles International Airport from Bogotá, Colombia. Customs inspectors detained Montoya de Hernandez upon her arrival based upon a suspicion that she was smuggling drugs. After 16 hours and a rectal examination by a physician that produced a balloon containing a foreign substance, she passed balloons filled with cocaine from her alimentary canal. The defendant had claimed that she was pregnant, and she was given the opportunity to undergo an X-ray, but she refused after being informed that she would have to be handcuffed en route to the hospital. Over the next three days, the defendant passed 88 balloons filled with over one pound (0.45 kg) of cocaine.

At trial, Montoya de Hernandez alleged that her Fourth Amendment rights were violated by an unreasonable detention. The U.S. government contended that the inspectors had reasonable suspicion that the defendant-respondent was a drug smuggler. She had a noticeable bulge in her abdomen when she was detained, and a female inspector searched her revealing that Montoya de Hernandez was wearing two sets of elastic underpants and had paper towels lining her crotch area (as balloon swallowing makes bowel movements hard to control).

A federal district court disagreed with Montoya de Hernandez's Fourth Amendment claim, and she was subsequently convicted for federal narcotics offenses. The United States Court of Appeals for the Ninth Circuit reversed the district court's conviction, on the grounds that the district court had incorrectly refused to suppress evidence used against the defendant. The federal government appealed to the U.S. Supreme Court, which granted certiorari.

== Decision ==
The Supreme Court, in an opinion by Justice Rehnquist joined by Chief Justice Burger and Justices White, Blackmun, Powell and O'Connor, reversed the Ninth Circuit's holding that defendant was subject to an unreasonable search and seizure and upheld the conviction entered for charges brought by the government because custom agents were subject to a reasonable suspicion standard under the Fourth Amendment for detaining suspects.

The Supreme Court held that the detention of a traveler at the border, beyond the scope of a routine customs search and inspection, is justified at its inception if customs agents, considering all the facts surrounding the traveler and her trip, reasonably suspect that the traveler is smuggling contraband in her alimentary canal; here, the facts, and their rational inferences, known to the customs officials clearly supported a reasonable suspicion that respondent was an alimentary canal smuggler.

Justice Stevens filed a concurring opinion, while Justice Brennan, joined by Justice Marshall dissented, stating that "Indefinite involuntary incommunicado detentions "for investigation" are the hallmark of a police state, not a free society".

== See also ==
- Border search exception
- List of United States Supreme Court cases, volume 473
