= Tobias Barry Sr. =

American politician

Member of the Illinois House of Representatives

Personal details
- Born: Ladd, Illinois
- Party: Democratic

Tobias G. Barry Sr. (October 1, 1895 – June 16, 1958) was an American politician.

Born in Ladd, Illinois, Barry served in the United States Navy during World War I. He worked in the Illinois Third Vein Coal Mine and also managed the Chanticleer Dance Pavilion. He served as chief of police for Ladd, Illinois and was also superintendent of streets and constable. Barry was a Democrat. He served in the Illinois House of Representatives from 1951 until his death. On June 16, 1958, Barry died after he fell out of a window at St. Nicholas Hotel in Springfield, Illinois; he had a heart ailment. His son was Tobias Barry who also served in the Illinois House of Representatives.
