= Sherman Skolnick =

American journalist

Sherman H. Skolnick
- Born: July 13, 1930; Chicago, Illinois, US
- Died: May 21, 2006 (aged 75); Chicago, Illinois, US
- Occupations: Author and investigative journalist

Sherman H. Skolnick (July 13, 1930 – May 21, 2006) was a Chicago-based activist and conspiracy theorist.

== Early life ==
Born in Chicago in 1930, at the age of six, Skolnick was paralyzed by polio, and he used a wheelchair for the rest of his life. His parents, a homemaker and a tailor, were Jewish European immigrants. Skolnick's father was from Russia.

== Career ==
Skolnick was founder and chairman of the Citizens' Committee to Clean Up the Courts, which he started in 1963. He used the local press to distribute his reports, later establishing a telephone hotline–"Hotline News", a public-access television show on cable TV, and a web site.

Skolnick's investigations put Otto Kerner Jr. in prison for three years; and led to the resignation of two Illinois Supreme Court justices, Roy J. Solfisburg, Jr. and Ray Klingbiel, who, as Skolnick reported, had accepted bribes of stock from a defendant in a case on which they ruled. The scandal catapulted John Paul Stevens, special counsel to an investigating commission, to fame as a justice of the U.S. Supreme Court. In 2001, the story became the subject of a book, Illinois Justice, by Kenneth A. Manaster. His investigations also revealed corruption at the Bank of Credit and Commerce International (BCCI).

Skolnick's final written works include an 81-part series entitled "The Overthrow of the American Republic," and a 16-part series entitled "Coca-Cola, the CIA, and the Courts."

== Later life and death ==
Skolnick died of a heart attack on May 21, 2006.

== Publications ==
=== Articles ===
- "The Late Grand Dragon of the Washington Post." Skolnick's Report (July 23, 2001).

=== Books ===
- Ahead of the Parade: A Who's Who of Treason and High Crimes – Exclusive Details of Fraud and Corruption of the Monopoly Press, the Banks, the Bench and the Bar, and the Secret Political Police. Dandelion Books (2003). ISBN 9781893302327.
- Overthrow of the American Republic: Writings of Sherman H. Skolnick. Dandelion Books (2007). ISBN 1893302229, 978-1893302228.
