= James D. Heiple =

American judge (1933–2021)

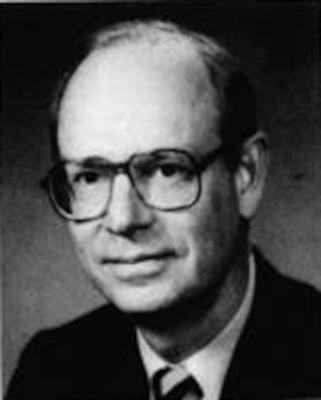

Chief Justice of the Illinois Supreme Court
- In office January 1997 – May 2, 1997
- Preceded by: Michael A. Bilandic
- Succeeded by: Charles E. Freeman

Justice of the Illinois Supreme Court
- In office December 3, 1990 – December 3, 2000
- Preceded by: Howard C. Ryan
- Succeeded by: Thomas Kilbride

Judge of the Illinois Court of Appeals
- In office 1980–1990

Personal details
- Born: September 13, 1933 Peoria, Illinois
- Died: January 18, 2021 (aged 87) Peoria, Illinois
- Party: Republican
- Education: Bradley University (BS); University of Louisville (JD); University of Virginia (LLM)
- Occupation: lawyer, judge

James Dee Heiple (September 13, 1933 – January 18, 2021) was an American attorney and jurist. He was elected as a justice of the Illinois Supreme Court in 1990, and went on to serve as its chief justice briefly in 1997, and continued to serve on the court until his retirement in 2000.

== Early life and education ==
Born in Peoria, Illinois, Heiple received a B.S. from Bradley University in his hometown. He studied law in Louisville, Kentucky, and received a J.D. from the University of Louisville School of Law in 1957. Heiple later received an LL.M from the University of Virginia School of Law.

== Career ==
After admission to Illinois bar, Heiple entered private legal practice with his father in Tazewell County, Illinois, with offices in Washington and Pekin, until 1970. He specialized in municipal law and acted as corporation counsel for many municipalities. During this period, he also worked as an appellate law clerk, public defender, special master in chancery, manager of two banks, and farm-owner. He served as president of the Illinois Judges Association and Tazewell County Bar Association, as well as acting as chair for Illinois State Bar Association councils.

Heiple was elected to the Illinois Circuit Court in 1970. Ten years later, he was elected to the Illinois Appellate Court. He successfully ran in 1990 to succeed retiring Illinois Supreme Court Justice Howard C. Ryan, for whom he had previously clerked. He billed himself as a "Common Sense Choice" for north-central Illinois and won that election against Tobias Barry by less than one percentage point. Several lawyers were of the opinion that Heiple would more inclined to engage in oral arguments and author dissenting opinions, given his reputation as "an independent thinker".

Heiple authored the state Supreme Court's opinion in the controversial "Baby Richard Case" in 1994. The case involved a mother who was no longer in a relationship with the father and consequently gave up their baby for adoption without informing him. Heiple notably wrote how the state's adoption laws "are designed to protect natural parents in their preemptive rights to their own children wholly apart from any consideration of the so-called best interests of the child. If it were otherwise, few parents would be secure in the custody of their own children". In doing so, he reversed the decisions of the circuit and appeals courts and gave custody of the child to the biological father. The judgment led to criticism among the general populace and public disagreement between Heiple and elected officials, including Jim Edgar, the Governor of Illinois at the time.

=== Censure ===
The Illinois Judicial Inquiry Board investigated complaints in 1996 that Heiple abused his position during several traffic stops and disobeyed police. Several legal scholars were of the opinion that the investigation resulted – at least to some degree – from the public attention drawn by the aforementioned adoption opinion and its unpopularity. He was selected by his fellow justices as the chief justice in January 1997. The formal complaint filed that same month discussed the various traffic stops in Pekin and various western Illinois counties. It ultimately led to formal censure of Heiple by the Illinois Courts Commission on April 30, 1997. This prompted his resignation as chief justice (but not the court) on May 2, 1997.

On April 14, 1997, Heiple was the subject of the first judicial impeachment proceedings in Illinois in 145 years, conducted by an investigative panel of ten representatives of the Illinois House of Representatives. Fellow Justice Benjamin K. Miller testified during Heiple's impeachment proceedings that Heiple had failed to let other court members know the seriousness of the Commission's investigation. The panel voted not to impeach Heiple; he remained on the bench through the end of his term in 2000. Voters elected Democrat Thomas Kilbride to succeed Heiple. By the end of his tenure on the Illinois Supreme Court, he had written 175 majority opinions, 98 dissents, 27 special concurrences, and 18 partial concurrences or partial dissents.

== Personal life ==
Heiple married Virginia Kerswill on July 28, 1956. Together, they had three children: Jeremy, Jonathan, and Rachel. His wife died in 1995, and their daughter died almost two decades later in 2014. Both his sons followed their father's footsteps and joined the legal profession. Heiple was a life member of the National Rifle Association of America.

Heiple died on January 18, 2021, at the OSF Saint Francis Medical Center in Peoria, Illinois. He was 87 and suffered a brain hemorrhage in the time leading up to his death.

Political offices
| Preceded by Howard C. Ryan | Justice of the Illinois Supreme Court; 1990–2000 | Succeeded by Thomas R. Fitzgerald |
