= Roy Solfisburg =

American judge

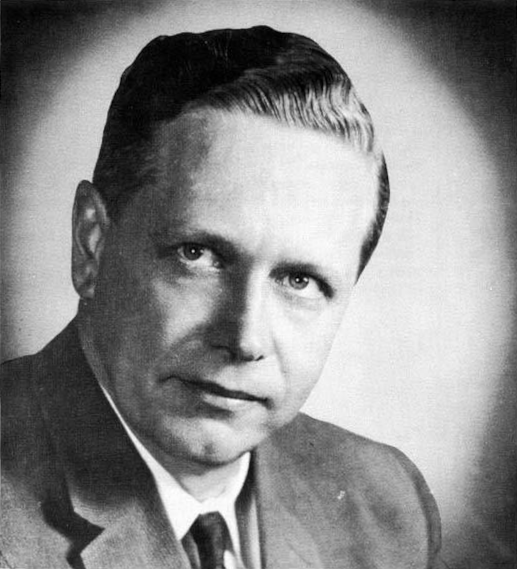
Solfisburg's official photograph, c. 1969.

Roy John Solfisburg Jr. (September 9, 1912 – April 19, 1991) was the Chief Justice of Illinois for the 1962–63 term and again from 1967 to 1969. Solfisburg was elected to the Illinois Supreme Court in 1960, the first time in the states history a sitting Justice was defeated by a challenger. This created a political stir having a historically Republican candidate unseat a "Daley Democrat". As the then youngest Justice his brethren selected Solfisburg as chief justice for the 1962–63 term and in 1967, his colleagues again later elected him to an additional 3-year term as chief justice. Illinois Senator Everett Dirksen championed Solfisburg for an opening on the U.S. Supreme Court. Both in Illinois and Washington D.C. it was widely reported he was at the top of the U.S. Supreme Court nominee "short list".

After Solfisburg's death, Edward M.Burke, "The Dean of The Chicago City Council", long time Daley associate, presented a resolution that was unanimously passed and signed by Richard M. Daley concluding "Whereas, Justice Solfisburg proved to be a wise and effective judge during his nine years on the Supreme Court and contributed greatly to the legal system in Illinois – May 22nd, 1991 Resolution, The City Council, City of Chicago, Illinois.

The significance of Burke's honoring Solfisburg, a former active Republican, derives from Burke's role as the longtime chairman of the judicial slating subcommittee of the Cook County Democratic Party, as Illinois judges are elected in partisan elections.

Solfisburg's aspirations to the highest court were thwarted following a finding of "an appearance of impropriety" and "certain positive acts of impropriety" based on Sherman Skolnick's accusations. Solfisburg and Associate Justice Ray Klingbiel were accused of corruptly accepting stock from the Civic Center Bank & Trust Company (CCB) of Chicago at the same time that litigation involving the CCB was pending at the Illinois Supreme Court. Solfisburg was in fact found to have purchased his stock while Klingbel had received his stock as a gift or contribution. Solfisburg resigned from the court to run a private legal practice.

== Background ==
Solfisburg was born in Aurora, Illinois in 1912 and attended public school in Aurora. He received his LL.B. from the University of Illinois College of Law in 1940.

Returning to Aurora, Solfisburg served as the city's Corporation Counsel from 1949 to 1953.

== Judicial career ==
In 1953, Solfisburg became a Commissioner of the Illinois Court of Claims. In 1954, he became the Master in Chancery of the Circuit Court of Kane County. In 1956, he won a by-election held to fill a vacancy in the position of Circuit Judge for the 16th Judicial Division; he was re-elected in 1957. In July 1957, the Illinois Supreme Court appointed Solfisburg to the Appellate Court, Second District; he served as that court's Presiding Judge from 1959 to 1960. In 1960 he was elected by popular vote to The Illinois Supreme Court.

In the wake of Abe Fortas's resignation, the media mentioned Solfisburg as a possible replacement for Fortas on the Supreme Court of the United States. Solfisburg, however, soon resigned in circumstances similar to those that forced Fortas to resign. (Senators Everett Dirksen and Charles H. Percy both encouraged President Richard Nixon to appoint Solfisburg to the Supreme Court.)

== The 1969 commissions history ==
In 1969, Sherman Skolnick, head of the Citizens' Committee to Clean Up the Courts, examined the stockholder records and discovered that both Solfisburg and Justice Klingbiel owned stock in the CCB. This made him suspicious since in People v. Isaacs, the Supreme Court had upheld a dismissal of charges against Theodore J. Isaacs, the general counsel of the CCB and the records showed that the two justices acquired the stock shortly before their decision in Isaacs. Skolnick contacted several members of the media, and the story was broken in the Alton Evening-Telegraph before being picked up by all the major papers.

After four expensive but inconclusive investigations The Illinois House of Representatives unanimously voted to appoint a special committee to investigate the matter, but before it could act, the Supreme Court, acting on its "inherent powers", granted a motion filed by Skolnick to appoint a special commission to investigate. (Ironically, the regular commission that investigated judicial malfeasance was chaired by Associate Justice Klingbiel, who was also accused of wrongdoing by Skolnick.) The commission was co-chaired by the president of the Chicago Bar Association and the president of the Illinois Bar Association. They named John Paul Stevens, a private practitioner with a thriving antitrust practice, as their independent counsel, thus setting the stage for Stevens' meteoric rise to the Supreme Court of the United States. In 1969, the Greenberg Commission, appointed by the Illinois Supreme Court to investigate Sherman Skolnick's corruption allegations leveled at former Chief Justice Ray Klingbiel and current Chief Justice Roy J. Solfisburg Jr., named Stevens as their counsel, meaning that he essentially served as the commission's special prosecutor.[4] The commission was widely thought to be a whitewash, but Stevens proved them wrong by vigorously prosecuting the justices, forcing them from office in the end.[11] As a result of the prominence he gained during the Greenberg Commission, Stevens became Second Vice President of the Chicago Bar Association in 1970.

During the course of the investigation, the Special Prosecutor John Paul Stevens (who formerly relatively unknown, through these hearings gained notice and ended up replacing Solfisburg as a U.S. Supreme Court Justice candidate and ultimately gained the appointment. Stephens discovered that Solfisburg in fact held $14,000 worth of CCB stock. He uncovered many irregularities in which steps were taken to conceal the owners of the stock, most damningly that Solfisburg "appeared" to have established a trust fund to hold the stock solely for the purpose of concealing his ownership from the public record. Much was made that Solfisburg a) owned this stock, and b) and held the stock in trust, which Stephens maintained was the only time Solfisburg had held assets in such a trust. Solfisburg in fact had often owned bank stock, and unlike Klingbiel paid for the stock. Further Solfisburg, the father of five including one with special needs had created such trusts at least as early as 1962 with the Old Second National Bank as trustee. There was also evidence that Solfisburg had known Isaacs prior to People v. Isaacs.

The special committee recommended that Solfisburg and Klingbiel (who became involved when Solfisburg suggested to one of Isaacs' associates that CCB should "do something nice" for Klingbiel and CCB subsequently gave stock to Klingbiel) should resign. For separate reasons this led to both the justices resigning from the Illinois Supreme Court. Klingbiel retired and Solfisburg returned to practice law and financially recover from the legal cost of his five successful defenses.

== Later years and family ==
Following his resignation, Solfisburg returned to private practice in Aurora, taking on his first case (being appointed by a circuit court judge to represent an indigent young man challenging his conviction for burglary) less than a month after his resignation.

In 1971, one of his cases actually took Solfisburg back to the Illinois Supreme Court, this time as a lawyer not a judge. The night before his scheduled argument, Solfisburg had a heart attack in his hotel. He recovered quickly, though, and soon went on to argue and win the case. He successfully argued before the Illinois Supreme Court again in 1984.

Solfisburg died in April 1991 in Fort Myers, Florida.

Roy currently has extended family living in southern Wisconsin and Illinois.
