= Ray Klingbiel =

American judge (1901–1973)

Ray I. Klingbiel
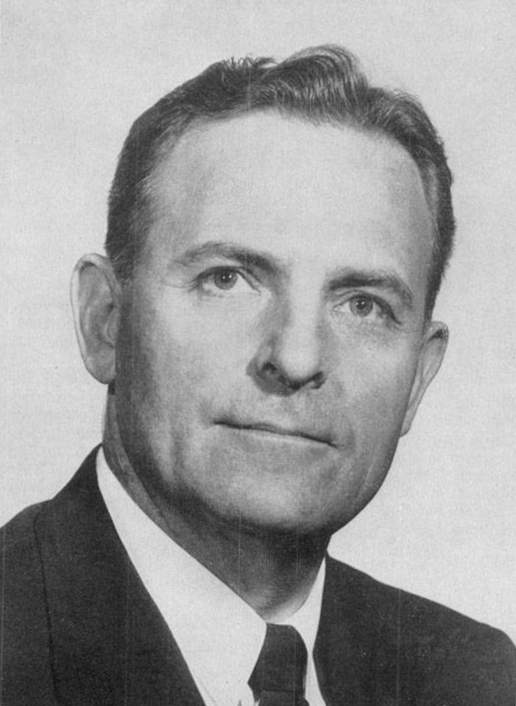

Chief Justice of the Illinois Supreme Court
- In office 1956–1957; 1964–1967

Justice of the Illinois Supreme Court
- In office 1953–1969
- Preceded by: Frank K. Dunn
- Succeeded by: John T. Culbertson Jr.

Circuit Court Judge
- In office 1945–1953

Personal details
- Born: March 1, 1901 East Moline, Illinois, US
- Died: January 10, 1973 (aged 71) East Moline, Illinois, US
- Party: Republican
- Education: University of Illinois Urbana-Champaign
- Alma mater: University of Illinois College of Law
- Occupation: lawyer, judge

Raymond I. Klingbiel (March 1, 1901 – January 18, 1973) was an Illinois lawyer and judge who twice served as the Chief Justice of Illinois (1956–1957, and 1964–1967) during sixteen years as justice of that court. In 1969, Klingbiel and then Chief Justice Roy J. Solfisburg, Jr. were involved in a major state scandal, after Sherman Skolnick revealed that both had accepted stock from the Civic Center Bank & Trust Company (CCB) of Chicago while litigation involving the CCB was pending at the Illinois Supreme Court. The scandal forced Klingbiel to resign.

== Early and family life ==
Klingbiel was born on March 2, 1901, in East Moline, Illinois. He attended public schools in East Moline and then attended the University of Illinois Urbana-Champaign, which awarded him a law degree in 1924. While there, he was a member of the Phi Delta Phi legal fraternity. He later received an honorary doctorate of law from the Chicago-Kent College of Law and was active with the Rotary Club and the Masonic Lodge (achieving the 33rd Degree).

== Early legal career ==
Upon admission to the bar, Klingbiel returned to East Moline and served as a city attorney for 12 years. He then won election as mayor and served from 1939 until 1945. During this period, Klingbiel established a reputation as a kingpin in the Rock Island County Republican Party and Downstate Illinois political power structure, in part as he was the county campaign manager for Governor Dwight Green who won election in 1940 in the backlash against the New Deal.

== Judicial career ==
In 1945, Klingbiel won election as an Illinois circuit judge, a position which he held until 1953, when he joined the Supreme Court of Illinois. He served as member for the 4th District from 1953 to 1963, and then, following an amendment to the judicial article in the Illinois Constitution in 1962, as member for the 3rd District from 1963 to 1969. He served as chief justice for the 1956–57 term and again from 1964 to January 1967.

== The 1969 scandal ==
In 1969, Sherman Skolnick, head of the Citizens' Committee to Clean Up the Courts, examined the stockholder records of the Civic Center Bank & Trust Company (CCB) and discovered that both Klingbiel and Chief Justice Roy Solfisburg owned stock in the CCB. This made him suspicious, because in People v. Isaacs, the Supreme Court had upheld a dismissal of charges against Theodore J. Isaacs, the general counsel of the CCB, and the records showed that the two justices acquired the stock shortly before their decision in Isaacs. Klingbiel's CCB stock was worth about $2500. Skolnick contacted several members of the media, and the story was broken in the Alton Evening Telegraph before being picked up by all the major papers.

The Illinois House of Representatives unanimously voted to appoint a special committee to investigate the matter, but before it could act, the Supreme Court, acting on its "inherent powers", granted a motion filed by Skolnick to appoint a special commission to investigate. (Ironically, the regular commission that investigated judicial malfeasance was chaired by Klingbiel.) The commission was co-chaired by the president of the Chicago Bar Association and the president of the Illinois State Bar Association. They named John Paul Stevens, a private practitioner with a thriving antitrust practice, as their independent counsel, thus setting the stage for Stevens' meteoric rise to the Supreme Court of the United States.

During the course of the investigation, Klingbiel initially said that he had purchased the stock long after the decision in Isaacs, but when it was revealed that he had received the stock as a gift before the decision, he claimed that the stock was a campaign contribution, which did not seem plausible since it was received after the campaign was over and his campaign fund still had money in it. Stevens' investigation further revealed that Klingbiel was assigned the decision in Isaacs, though it was not his turn in the court's rotation, and he discovered evidence of Solfisburg suggesting that CCB officials "do something nice" for Klingbiel. When the commission reported back, it recommended that both Klingbiel and Solfisburg resign, which they grudgingly did a short while later.

Klingbiel remained bitter about the "political push" which took him from the bench, and to the end refused to admit that he had done anything wrong.

== Death and legacy ==
Klingbiel died in East Moline less than a year after his wife, the former Julia L. Stone, and was buried beside her at Rose Lawn Memorial Estate in Moline.

Political offices
Preceded by William J. Fulton	Justice of the Illinois Supreme Court; 1953–1969	Succeeded by John T. Culbertson Jr.
