= John T. Culbertson Jr. =

American judge

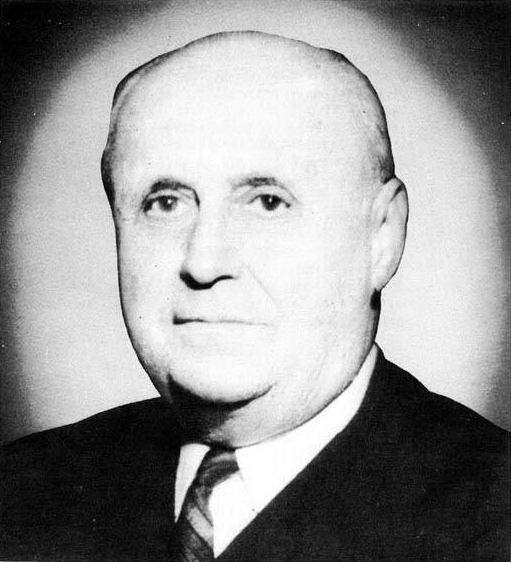

Justice of the Illinois Supreme Court
- In office 1969–1970
- Preceded by: Ray Klingbiel
- Succeeded by: Howard C. Ryan

Judge of the Illinois Court of Appeals
- In office 1939–1964

Judge of the 10th Circuit Court
- In office 1934–1968

Judge of the Tazewell County Court
- In office 1930–1934

Personal details
- Born: August 7, 1891 Delavan, Illinois, US
- Died: July 26, 1982 (aged 90) Delavan, Illinois, US
- Spouse: Helen Read
- Education: Illinois Wesleyan University
- Occupation: lawyer, judge

John T. Culbertson Jr. (August 7, 1891 – July 26, 1982) was an Illinois lawyer and judge.

== Early and family life ==
Born in Delavan, Tazewell County, Illinois, Culbertson graduated from Delavan High School. He received his law degree from Illinois Wesleyan University in 1913. In 1915, he married Helen Read; they had one daughter.

== Career ==
Admitted to the Illinois bar in 1913 and the Missouri bar the following year, Culbertson taught law at the Kansas City School of Law in 1914 and 1915. He began practicing law in his hometown in 1916 and his brother Robert M. Culberton joined in 1926 and he and his son of the same name would continue that private legal practice even when John Culbertson left it upon becoming a judge. Culbertson served on the county and circuit courts for Tazewell County, Illinois from 1930 until 1934. On June 4, 1934, as the Democratic nominee, he won a special election to fill a vacancy on the 10th Circuit Court left by the death of John M Niehaus, defeating Republican George Z. Varnee by 37,972 votes to 31,654. Culbertson also served on the Illinois Appellate Court for three decades, first in the Third District and after 1964 in the Fourth District. After Illinois Supreme Court justice Ray Klingbiel resigned in a scandal, Judge Culbertson served on Illinois's highest court in 1969 and 1970 before retiring. His successor was Howard C. Ryan.

== Death and legacy ==
Judge Culbertson died at his home in Delavan, Illinois in 1982.

== Notes ==
Political offices
| Preceded by Ray I. Klingbiel | Justice of the Illinois Supreme Court; 1969–1970 | Succeeded by Howard C. Ryan |
