= Richard Mautino =

American politician

Richard A. Mautino (July 7, 1938 – August 29, 1991) was an American politician.

Born in Spring Valley, Illinois, Mautino received his bachelor's degree in business from Bradley University. He served eight years as an alderman in Spring Valley, Illinois and two years as a member of the Bureau County Board. He served in the Illinois House of Representatives from 1975 until his death in 1991. Mautino died in Spring Valley, Illinois of a heart attack. His son Frank Mautino was appointed to succeed him. The library in Spring Valley is named in his honor. He was an appointed trustee for the library from 1966 until entering the state legislature.
