= Robert M. Wilson Jr. =

American lawyer (1952–2012)

- Born: April 28, 1952; Little Rock, Arkansas, US
- Died: 3 August 2012 (aged 60); Little Rock, Arkansas, US
- Education: University of Arkansas, B.A. and J.D.
- Occupation: Attorney
- Employer(s): Wilson & Associates PLLC
- Organization(s): USFN; Wilson History and Research Center

Robert M. Wilson Jr. (April 28, 1952 – August 3, 2012) was an American lawyer who established Wilson & Associates law firm, with offices in Little Rock, Arkansas; Nashville, Tennessee; and Memphis, Tennessee. In 2008, Wilson founded the Wilson History and Research Center in Little Rock to collect and study military helmets.

== Early life ==
Robert M. "Robby" Wilson Jr. was born in Little Rock, Arkansas on April 28, 1952. His parents were Jan (née Herrick) and Robert M. "Bob" Wilson Sr.

Wilson attended Little Rock public schools and the Anthony School, which was established by his aunt. He graduated from Hall High School in 1970. He enlisted in the Arkansas Air National Guard and attended basic training at Lackland Air Force Base in San Antonio, Texas in 1970. He enrolled in the University of Arkansas in the spring semester 1971. While there, he joined Kappa Sigma fraternity.

In June 1972, he moved to Washington, D.C. to work on the staff of Arkansas Senator John McClellan. While in Washington, D.C., he attended American University. In the fall of 1973, Wilson returned to the University of Arkansas and graduated with a B.A. in political science in 1975. In 1976, he was honorably discharged from the Arkansas Air National Guard.

Wilson started law school at the University of Arkansas, graduating with a Juris Doctor in 1977. While in law school Wilson was a member of Phi Alpha Delta law fraternity and served two terms as treasurer of the Student Bar Association. He passed the bar for the State of Arkansas and Federal Courts in the spring of 1978.

== Career ==
He began his career as a tax law attorney in Little Rock, Arkansas, in 1978 with Hamilton, O'Hara and Hays; the firm was called Hamilton, Mackey, Wilson, Johnson and Wood from 1979 to 1982. In 1982, the firm transitioned became Wilson & Wood and was built upon Wilson's relationship with Union National Bank. In 1982, the firm was joined by David Hargis and became Wilson, Wood and Hargis. The trio amiably parted ways in the fall of 1985 and Wilson, changed the name of his practice from to Wilson & Associates PLLC, which became one of the largest law firms in Arkansas and opened branches in Memphis and Nashville, Tennessee. In 2008, Wilson retired from the full-time daily practice of law.

Wilson was admitted to the bar in the State of Arkansas; the United States District Court for the Eastern District of Arkansas in 1978, the United States Court of Appeals for the Eighth Circuit in 1978, the Supreme Court of the United States in 1986; the Judiciary of Texas in 1991, and the Tennessee State Courts in 1996. He was a follow of the American College of Mortgage Attorneys and belonged to the American Bar Association, the Arkansas Bar Foundation, the Arkansas Realtors Association, the Arkansas Trial Lawyers Association, the Association of Trial Lawyers of America, the Mortgage Bankers Association of America, the Pulaski County Bar Association, the Tennessee Bar Association, the Tennessee Mortgage Bankers Association, the Texas Bar Association, and the Texas Mortgage Bankers Association. In 1987, he was the founding president and board chairman of the USFN, an educational nonprofit organization for mortgage and bankruptcy attorneys.

== Wilson History & Research Center ==
In 2008, Wilson founded the Wilson History and Research Center (WHRC) in Little Rock, Arkansas. WHRC was a non-profit lending institution dedicated to locating, acquiring, authenticating, and preserving helmets and other historic military headwear of the 20th century. Consisting of some 17,000 items, WHRC had one of the largest collections of its kind in the world. The museum closed after Wilson died in 2012.

== Awards ==
- 1987-1988 Mortgage Bankers of Arkansas President's Award of Excellence
- 1993–1994 Mortgage Bankers of Arkansas President's Award of Excellence

== Personal life ==
Wilson was married to Jennifer Wilson-Harvey, who was also his law partner. They had two children, Robert M. Wilson III and Jillian Herrick Wilson. He was a member of Trinity Episcopal Cathedral.

In 2009, Wilson donated a restored Piper L-3 Grasshopper, spotter plane to the D-Day Museum. The gift was a part of the 65th D-Day remembrance.

In March 2010 Wilson was diagnosed with terminal esophageal cancer. After treatment at the Winthrop P. Rockefeller Cancer Treatment Center at the University of Arkansas Medical School in Little Rock, he was found in January 2010 to be cancer free. He was named as one of the Faces of Cancer for 2011 by the American Cancer Society. Wilson died from cancer on August 3, 2012.

== Selected publications ==
- Exotische: Rare Cloth Headgear of the Third Reich, with co-author Paul Sack. Little Rock: Wilson History and Research Center, 2010. ISBN 978-0615371160
- Exotische Vol. 2: French Kepis of the Twentieth Century, with Paul Sack, Jordan Winter, and Xavier Aiolfi. Little Rock: Wilson History and Research Center, 2012. ISBN 978-0615616872
