= James P. Aylward =

American lawyer (1885–1982)

James Patrick Aylward (September 10, 1885 – July 22, 1982) was a Missouri attorney, Democratic party leader, and a political associate of President Harry S. Truman.

== Early life ==
James Patrick Aylward was born in Peoria, Illinois on September 10, 1885 to Irish Catholic immigrants. When he was about six months old, his family relocated to Kansas City, Missouri, where his twelve brothers and sisters were born. He left school after fifth grade and began to take on a variety of jobs: newspaper carrier, Western Union delivery boy, office boy.

== Legal career ==
In 1899, he came to work for a prominent Kansas City attorney, Frank P. Walsh. Walsh inspired Aylward's interest in both the law and in Democratic politics.

He began the study of law in that law office, and eventually went to night school at the Kansas City School of Law (now the University of Missouri–Kansas City School of Law), where he joined the Phi Alpha Delta law fraternity. He was admitted to the bar in 1908, and became partners with longtime mentor Frank Walsh. He continued his involvement in Missouri politics as well as in the Phi Alpha Delta national organization, and lectured on insurance law at the Kansas City School of Law.

== Democratic politics ==
From 1918 to 1936, he served as chair of the Jackson County Democratic committee. In 1934, Democratic boss Tom Pendergast asked him to run for U.S. Senator; he declined, and recommended county judge Harry S. Truman instead. When Truman became a candidate, Aylward served as his campaign manager, helping him win the Democratic primary and the general election.

Success on the Truman campaign helped Aylward take over as state chair of the Missouri Democratic Party from 1934 to 1940 and serve as a member of Democratic National Committee for Missouri from 1934-1944. In 1936, he had the honor of seconding the nomination for Franklin D. Roosevelt at the 1936 Democratic National Convention.

== Death and legacy ==
Aylward died in Kansas City, and is buried in Calvary Cemetery there.

His son, James P. Aylward Jr. (1918-2011) was also prominent in Missouri Democratic politics, serving as Jackson County Tax Collector and as Democratic candidate for Lieutenant Governor in 1972.
