= List of United States Supreme Court cases, volume 473 =

This is a list of all United States Supreme Court cases from volume 473 of the United States Reports:

Case name	Citation	Date decided
Marek v. Chesny	473 U.S. 1	1985
United States v. Shearer	473 U.S. 52	1985
NLRB v. Longshoremen	473 U.S. 61	1985
Pattern Makers v. NLRB	473 U.S. 95	1985
Massachusetts Mut. Life Ins. Co. v. Russell	473 U.S. 134	1985
Kentucky v. Graham	473 U.S. 159	1985
Williamson County Regional Planning Comm'n v. Hamilton Bank of Johnson City	473 U.S. 172	1985
Dowling v. United States	473 U.S. 207	1985
Atascadero State Hospital v. Scanlon	473 U.S. 234	1985
Walters v. National Assn. of Radiation Survivors	473 U.S. 305	1985
School Dist. of Grand Rapids v. Ball	473 U.S. 373	1985
Aguilar v. Felton	473 U.S. 402	1985
Cleburne v. Cleburne Living Center, Inc.	473 U.S. 432	1985
Sedima, S. P. R. L. v. Imrex Co.	473 U.S. 479	1985
United States v. Montoya de Hernandez	473 U.S. 531	1985
Thomas v. Union Carbide Agricultural Products Co.	473 U.S. 568	1985
American Nat. Bank & Trust Co. of Chicago v. Haroco, Inc.	473 U.S. 606	1985
Oklahoma v. Arkansas	473 U.S. 610	1985
Mitsubishi Motors Corp. v. Soler Chrysler-Plymouth, Inc.	473 U.S. 614	1985
United States v. Bagley	473 U.S. 667	1985
Carchman v. Nash	473 U.S. 716	1985
Oregon Dept. of Fish and Wildlife v. Klamath Tribe	473 U.S. 753	1985
Cornelius v. NAACP Legal Defense & Ed. Fund, Inc.	473 U.S. 788	1985
Office of Personnel Management v. Government Employees	473 U.S. 1301	1985
Block v. North Side Lumber Co.	473 U.S. 1307	1985
Heckler v. Redbud Hospital Dist.	473 U.S. 1308	1985
Riverside v. Rivera	473 U.S. 1315	1985
Renaissance Arcade and Bookstore v. County of Cook	473 U.S. 1322	1985
