= Wilson History and Research Center =

- Location in Arkansas Location in United States
- Established: 2008
- Dissolved: 2012
- Location: 27 Rahling Circle; Little Rock, Arkansas
- Coordinates: 34°46′12″N 92°27′21″W
- Type: History museum
- Website: wilsoncenter.org

Wilson History and Research Center (WHRC) was a non-profit 501(C)3 foundation that housed a private collection of twentieth century military headgear and other militaria in Little Rock, Arkansas. Robert M. Wilson Jr. founded WHRC in 2008. It closed in 2012 after Wilson died.

== History ==
Attorney Robert M. Wilson Jr. founded the Wilson History and Research Center (WHRC) in Little Rock, Arkansas in January 2008. In 2009, WHRC became a non-profit501(C)3 organization. It housed, studied, and preserved a private collection of twentieth century military headgear and other militaria, with the goal of collection every type of military headgear from the 20th century. The WHRC featured the largest collection of military headgear in the world, according to the Book of Alternative Records.

The collection was presented online through the WHRC's website and YouTube. It also loaned items to museums for display. WHRC was a pioneer in the use of x-ray fluorescence to authenticate headgear. In addition to its collection, the WHRC created several traveling exhibits. WHRC also published books related to military headgear.

WHRC closed in late 2012 when Wilson died. Its collection was donated to the International Museum of World War II Museum in Natick, Massachusetts; that museum closed in 2019. Items on loan to WHRC from Wilson's personal collection sold in an auction.

== Collection ==
The WHRC collection featured around 17,000 items and was one of the largest collections of its type in the world. It included headgear from nearly every era of the twentieth century but especially focused on World War I and World War II. The oldest piece in the collection dated to the early 19th century, with the latest pieces coming from the War in Afghanistan and War in Iraq. Items from various countries were represented, including Kazakhstan, North Korea, and Andorra.

Some items in the WHRC collection included:

- Helmet of Major Richard Winters, known through the television series Band of Brothers
- French cavalry helmet of General Victor d'Urbal
- Bronze cast of Marshal Paul von Hindenburg's right hand holding marshals baton
- U.S. M1 Steel Helmet belonging to General William M. Hoge
- U.S. Air Force visor hat of Chief of Staff General Lew Allen, Jr.
- U.S. Army dress visor hat of General Omar Bradley
- U.S. Navy dress bicorne hat of Admiral John Sidney McCain, Sr.
- Capt. Albert Sammt's visor hat of the Deutsche Zeppelin-Reederei
- Grappling hook used by U.S. Army Rangers at Point du Hoc
- German Kriegsmarine visor cap of u-boat Captain Heinrich Lehmann-Willenbrock

== Exhibitions ==
The WHRC created multiple exhibits for various places around Little Rock. An exhibit on the peace talks that ended World War I and World War II and exhibits on the German Freikorps of the early 1920s were displayed at the MacArthur Museum of Arkansas Military History. An exhibit on the Third Reich criminal court, titled "“Law in a Land Without Justice: Nazi Germany 1933-1945", was placed on display at the William H. Bowen School of Law.

== Publications ==
- Sack, Paul and Wilson, Robby. Exotische: Rare Cloth Headgear of the Third Reich. Little Rock: Wilson History and Research Center, 2010. ISBN 978-0615371160
- Sack, Paul and Wilson, Robby. Exotische Vol. 2: French Kepis of the Twentieth Century, with Paul Sack, Jordan Winter, and Xavier Aiolfi. Little Rock: Wilson History and Research Center, 2012. ISBN 978-0615616872
- Robert, Daniel. The American: The Life, Times, and War of Basil Antonelli. Little Rock: Wilson History and Research Center, 2012. ISBN 978-0578113425
