= Howard C. Ryan =

American judge

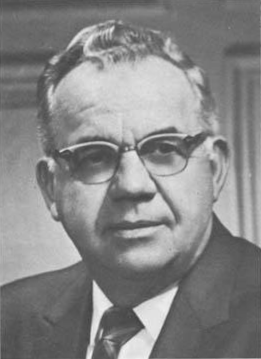

Justice of the Illinois Supreme Court
- In office 1970–1990
- Preceded by: John T. Culbertson Jr.
- Succeeded by: James D. Heiple

Judge of the Illinois Court of Appeals
- In office 1968–1970

Judge of the 13th Circuit Court of Illinois
- In office 1957–1968

Judge of the LaSalle County Court
- In office 1954–1957

Personal details
- Born: June 17, 1916 Tonica, LaSalle County, Illinois
- Died: December 10, 2008 (aged 92) Peru, LaSalle County, Illinois
- Party: Republican
- Education: University of Illinois
- Alma mater: University of Illinois College of Law
- Occupation: lawyer, judge

Howard Christopher Ryan (June 17, 1916 – December 10, 2008) was an Illinois attorney and judge, including service as judge of the Supreme Court of Illinois (1970 to 1990), and that court's Chief Justice (1982–1985).

== Early and family life ==
A native of Tonica, LaSalle County, Illinois, Howard C. Ryan grew up on a farm, and was educated in the local public schools, then LaSalle-Peru-Oglesby Junior College, the University of Illinois and the University of Illinois College of Law. He would enlist in the U.S. Army Air Corps, and serve 43 months during World War II as a radio operator with the 2nd Ferry Division Air Transport Command. In 1943 he married Helen (née Cizek), who predeceased him. They had a son and a daughter. Their son H. Chris Ryan, Jr., would continue his father's path as a lawyer and local judge and in 2010 begin serving as Chief Judge of the 13th Judicial Circuit

== Career ==
Admitted to the Illinois Bar on April 14, 1942, Ryan practiced law in Decatur, Macon County, Illinois for one and a half years after being discharged from his military service. He then returned to LaSalle County, where he lived in Tonica and moved his legal practice to Peru. He was appointed a part-time assistant LaSalle County state's attorney in 1952.

Elected the LaSalle county judge in 1954, in 1957 Ryan was elected circuit judge of the 13th Judicial Circuit, serving as chief judge from 1964 to 1968. He was elected to the 21-county 3rd District Appellate Court in 1968 and from that district was elected to the Supreme Court of Illinois in 1970, following a scandal which had led to two resignations. Ryan served as chief justice of the Supreme Court of Illinois from January 1982 to January 1985, and retired in 1990 after serving 36 years as a judge, including 20 years on the Illinois Supreme Court.

Ryan issued a 1978 ruling in which he critiqued Illinois' death penalty and anticipated problems cited years later when Governor George H. Ryan ordered a sweeping review of capital punishment. In the beginning of his Supreme Court tenure (Carey v. Cousins, 1977) Ryan opposed the death penalty but later (People vs. Lewis, 1981) voted in favor of it. In a 1991 interview to the Chicago Tribune Ryan said that he came to have fewer doubts about capital punishment and accepted it as the law of the land.

Ryan was a member of the LaSalle County, Illinois State and American Bar Associations, the American Judicature Society, Phi Alpha Delta law fraternity, the Odd Fellows and the Elks, the Tonica United Methodist Church as well as a 33rd degree Mason.

== Final years and death ==
After retiring from the bench, Ryan worked three years of counsel to the Chicago law firm Peterson and Ross and in a private mediation service. One of his former law clerks, who had later become an appellate judge in western Illinois, James D. Heiple, succeeded him. Judge Ryan survived his wife and died in an assisted living facility in Peru in 2008.

Political offices
| Preceded by John T. Culbertson Jr. | Justice of the Illinois Supreme Court; 1970–1990 | Succeeded by James D. Heiple |
