= Jeremy C. Daniel =

American judge (born 1978)

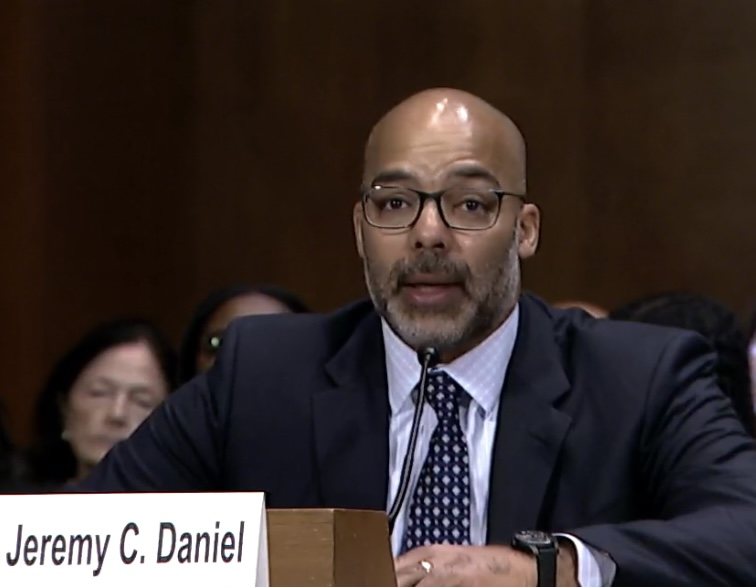

Judge of the United States District Court for the Northern District of Illinois
- Incumbent
- Assumed office June 6, 2023
- Appointed by: Joe Biden
- Preceded by: Gary Feinerman

Personal details
- Born: Jeremy Christen Daniel; 1978 (age 47–48) Chicago, Illinois, U.S.
- Education: Illinois Wesleyan University (BS); Loyola University Chicago (JD)

Military service
- Allegiance: United States
- Branch/service: United States Marine Corps Reserve (Lance Corporal, 1997–2000); United States Marine Corps (First Lieutenant, 2000–2004)
- Rank: First Lieutenant

Jeremy Christen Daniel (born 1978) is an American lawyer from Illinois who is serving as a United States district judge of the United States District Court for the Northern District of Illinois.

== Education ==
Daniel received a Bachelor of Science from Illinois Wesleyan University in 2000 and a Juris Doctor from Loyola University Chicago School of Law in 2007.

== Career ==
From 1997 to 2000, Daniel served in the United States Marine Corps Reserve, being honorably discharged in 2000 as a lance corporal. From 2000 to 2004, he served in the United States Marine Corps, being honorably discharged in 2004 with the rank of first lieutenant.

From 2007 to 2013, Daniel was an associate at Katten Muchin Rosenman in Chicago. He served as a law clerk for Judge Virginia Mary Kendall of the United States District Court for the Northern District of Illinois from 2013 to 2014. From 2014 to 2023, he served as an assistant United States attorney in the U.S. Attorney's Office for the Northern District of Illinois.

=== Notable cases ===
In 2020, Daniel prosecuted Chawain Lowe for possession of a firearm. Lowe unlawfully possessed a firearm and allegedly ditched the handgun in a dumpster as Chicago police were responding to shots being fired on May 22, 2019.

In 2023, Daniel prosecuted Robert M. Kowalski, who was found guilty of embezzling $8 million from Washington Federal Bank for Savings, a bank in Bridgeport. Kowalski was also found guilty of concealing more than $560,000 in assets when he filed for bankruptcy. Kowalski was a business partner of the bank's former president, chief executive officer, and major shareholder, John F. Gembara. Regulators shut down the bank after authorities accused Gembara of running an embezzlement scheme.

=== Federal judicial service ===
In December 2021, Daniel was recommended to the president by Senators Dick Durbin and Tammy Duckworth. On March 20, 2023, President Joe Biden announced his intent to nominate Daniel to serve as a United States district judge of the United States District Court for the Northern District of Illinois. On March 21, 2023, his nomination was sent to the Senate. President Biden nominated Daniel to a seat vacated by Judge Gary Feinerman, who resigned on December 31, 2022. On April 18, 2023, a hearing on his nomination was held before the Senate Judiciary Committee. On May 11, 2023, his nomination was reported out of committee by a 14–7 vote. On May 17, 2023, the United States Senate invoked cloture on his nomination by a 57–39 vote. Later that day, his nomination was confirmed by a 56–40 vote. He received his judicial commission on June 6, 2023. He was sworn in on June 27, 2023.

== See also ==
- List of African-American federal judges
- List of African-American jurists

Legal offices
Preceded by Gary Feinerman	Judge of the United States District Court for the Northern District of Illinois; 2023–present	Incumbent
