= Chicago law =

Chicago law may refer to:

- Chicago-Kent College of Law
- Loyola University Chicago School of Law
- Northwestern University School of Law
- University of Chicago Law School
