= Senator Cronin =

Senator Cronin may refer to:

- A. L. Cronin (1902–1974), Illinois State Senate
- Barth S. Cronin (1858–1933), New York State Senate
- Dan Cronin (born 1959), Illinois State Senate
- J. Wilmer Cronin (1896–1982), Maryland State Senate
- John Cronin (Massachusetts politician) (fl. 2020s), Massachusetts State Senate
