= Jesse Holdom =

American lawyer

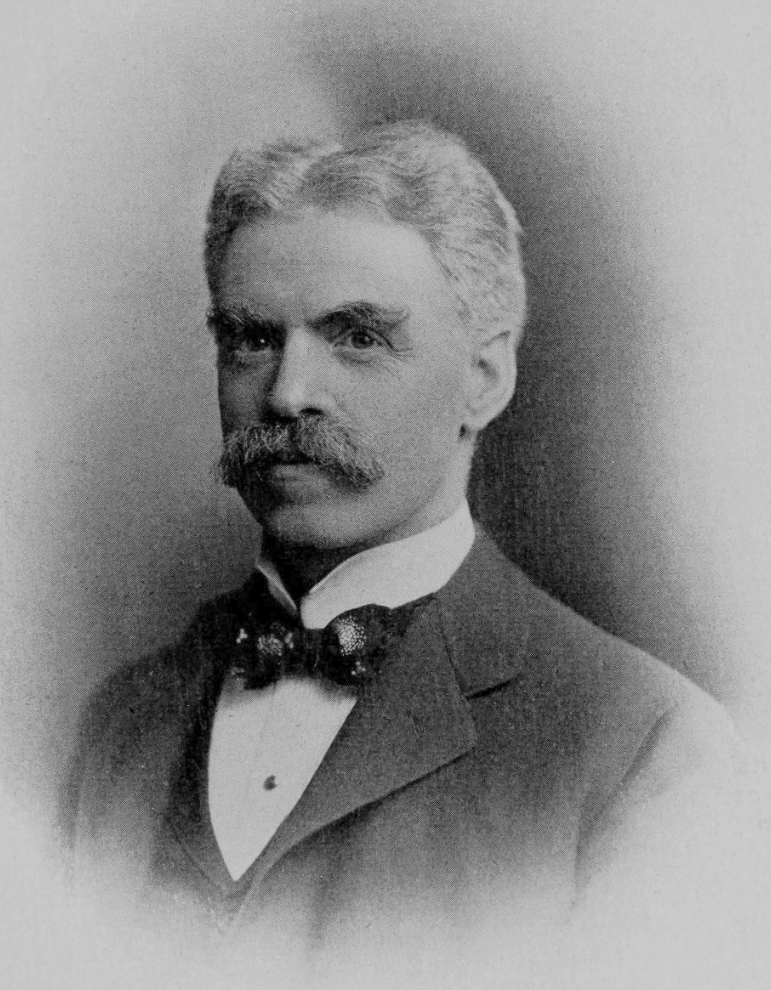
Jesse Holdom

Jesse Holdom (1851–1930) was a prominent Chicago lawyer and judge.

== Biography ==
Jesse Holdom was born in London on August 23, 1851, the son of William and Eliza (Merritt) Holdom. His Holdom ancestors had lived in the Spitalfields neighbourhood of London for nearly three hundred years, after fleeing France during the St. Bartholomew's Day massacre. Holdom immigrated to the United States at the age of seventeen, settling in Chicago in July 1868. Beginning in 1870, he read law with lawyer Joshua C. Knickerbocker. He was admitted to the bar of Illinois on September 13, 1873.

Holdom practiced law with Knickerbocker. In 1878, Knickerbocker invited Holdom to become a partner of his firm, which was then known as Knickerbocker & Holdom. Knickerbocker retired in 1889, and Holdom continued as a solo practitioner. He was a successful lawyer, particularly in cases involving wills and title to real estate. Governor of Illinois Joseph W. Fifer appointed Holdom as Public Guardian.

In November 1923, Holdom was elected as a judge of the Superior Court of Cook County, filling a vacancy left by the resignation of William Emmett Dever.

Holdom was active in the Chicago Bar Association and the Illinois State Bar Association, serving as ISBA president 1900-1901. He was also involved in Trinity Episcopal Church, the Republican Party, and the Union League Club of Chicago.

Holdom married Edith I. Foster in 1877. His first wife died in 1891. Holdom remarried in 1893, to Mabel Brady. Holdom had four children: Edith, Jessie, Martha, and Courtland.

Holdom died in Chicago on July 14, 1930.
