= Suzanne B. Conlon =

American judge (born 1939)

Senior Judge of the United States District Court for the Northern District of Illinois
- Incumbent
- Assumed office April 17, 2004

Judge of the United States District Court for the Northern District of Illinois
- In office February 22, 1988 – April 17, 2004
- Appointed by: Ronald Reagan
- Preceded by: Thomas Roberts McMillen
- Succeeded by: Virginia Mary Kendall

Personal details
- Born: Suzanne Ellsworth Brown; January 17, 1939 (age 87) Portland, Oregon, U.S.
- Spouse: John L. Conlon (m. 1971)
- Education: Mundelein College (BA); Loyola University Chicago (JD)

Suzanne Ellsworth Brown Conlon (born January 17, 1939) is an American attorney and jurist who is a senior United States district judge of the United States District Court for the Northern District of Illinois.

== Early life and education ==
Conlon was born Suzanne Ellsworth Brown in Portland, Oregon. She received a Bachelor of Arts degree from Mundelein College in 1963, a Juris Doctor from Loyola University Chicago School of Law in 1968, and a diploma in foreign and comparative law from the University of London in 1971.

== Career ==
She was a law clerk to Judge Edwin Albert Robson of the United States District Court for the Northern District of Illinois from 1968 to 1971. She was in private practice in Chicago, Illinois from 1972 to 1975. She was a member of the faculty of DePaul University from 1972 to 1975, as an assistant professor from 1972 to 1973 and a lecturer from 1973 to 1975. She was an Assistant United States Attorney of the Northern District of Illinois from 1976 to 1977, of the Central District of California from 1977 to 1982, and in Illinois again from 1982 to 1986. She was assistant general counsel to the United States Sentencing Commission in 1986, and was executive director of the commission from 1986 to 1987. She was a special counsel to Associate United States Attorney General Stephen S. Trott in 1988. She has been an adjunct professor at the Northwestern University School of Law from 1991 to the present.

=== Federal judicial service ===
On April 2, 1987, Conlon was nominated by President Ronald Reagan to a seat on the United States District Court for the Northern District of Illinois vacated by Judge Thomas Roberts McMillen. She was confirmed by the United States Senate on February 19, 1988, and received her commission on February 22, 1988. She assumed senior status on April 17, 2004. Conlon no longer maintains a docket in the Northern District of Illinois, but continues to hear cases as a visiting judge on other Federal courts.

=== Notable opinions ===
In 2011, in a highly publicized case, Conlon ruled in favor of Anita Alvarez (in her official capacity as State's Attorney for Cook County), granting the defendant's motion to dismiss ACLU v. Alvarez on the grounds of lack of jurisdiction by the district court. The suit sought to address the constitutionality of a state act that prohibits citizens from audio-taping on-duty police officers without the consent of the officers, with the ACLU arguing that the act ran counter to First Amendment principles. She was reversed by the Seventh Circuit Court of Appeals, which held that "[t]he Illinois eavesdropping statute restricts far more speech than necessary to protect legitimate privacy interests; as applied to the facts alleged here, it likely violates the First Amendment's free speech and free-press guarantees." The Seventh Circuit reversed and remanded with instructions to the district court to reopen the case and allow the amended complaint and enter a preliminary injunction enjoining the State's Attorney from applying the Illinois eavesdropping statute against the ACLU. Judge Posner dissented from the majority opinion, writing that he would have upheld Judge Conlon's opinion, albeit under different reasoning.

In 1992, Conlon granted an injunction to block the Chicago Cubs' move from the National League East to the National League West for the 1993 season.

== Sources ==
Legal offices
Preceded by Thomas Roberts McMillen	Judge of the United States District Court for the Northern District of Illinois; 1988–2004	Succeeded by Virginia Mary Kendall
