= Benjamin D. Magruder =

American judge

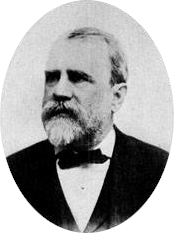

Justice of the Supreme Court of Illinois
- In office 1885–1906
- Preceded by: Theophilus Lyle Dickey
- Succeeded by: Orrin N. Carter

Master in Chancery of the Superior Court of Cook County
- In office 1868–1885

Personal details
- Born: September 27, 1838 Jefferson County, Mississippi
- Died: April 21, 1910 (aged 71) Chicago, Illinois
- Party: Republican
- Spouse: Julia Maria Latham
- Children: Ella, Henry
- Education: Yale University; University of Louisiana at New Orleans Law School
- Profession: Attorney

Benjamin Drake Magruder (September 27, 1838 – April 21, 1910) was an American judge in Illinois. Graduating from Yale University before he turned eighteen, Magruder studied law at the University of Louisiana at New Orleans Law School. He briefly worked a law office in Memphis, Tennessee before establishing a series of practices in Chicago, Illinois. He served on the Superior Court of Cook County for seventeen years starting in 1868. In 1885, he was elected to the Supreme Court of Illinois, where he wrote the decision denying the appeal of the Haymarket affair anarchists. He served in this court until 1906, then resumed a law practice.

== Biography ==
Benjamin Drake Magruder was born in Jefferson County, Mississippi on September 27, 1838. He entered Yale University at the age of fourteen, graduating fourth in his class four years later. He moved to Baton Rouge, Louisiana to teach at a school. In his free time, he studied law under Joseph Barton Elam. Magruder then attended the University of Louisiana at New Orleans Law School and graduated as valedictorian in 1858.

Magruder opened a law office in Memphis, Tennessee in September 1859. He moved to Chicago, Illinois in 1861 to escape the Civil War. George F. Bailey admitted him as a junior partner, forming the Bailey & Magruder law practice. He later formed his own law practice as Magruder & Norton. The firm later became Magruder & Kerr before Magruder joined in the formation of the Hervey, Galt & Magruder firm. Joseph Gary, a former partner of Bailey, appointed Magruder Master in Chancery for the Superior Court of Cook County in 1868. He served this court until 1885.

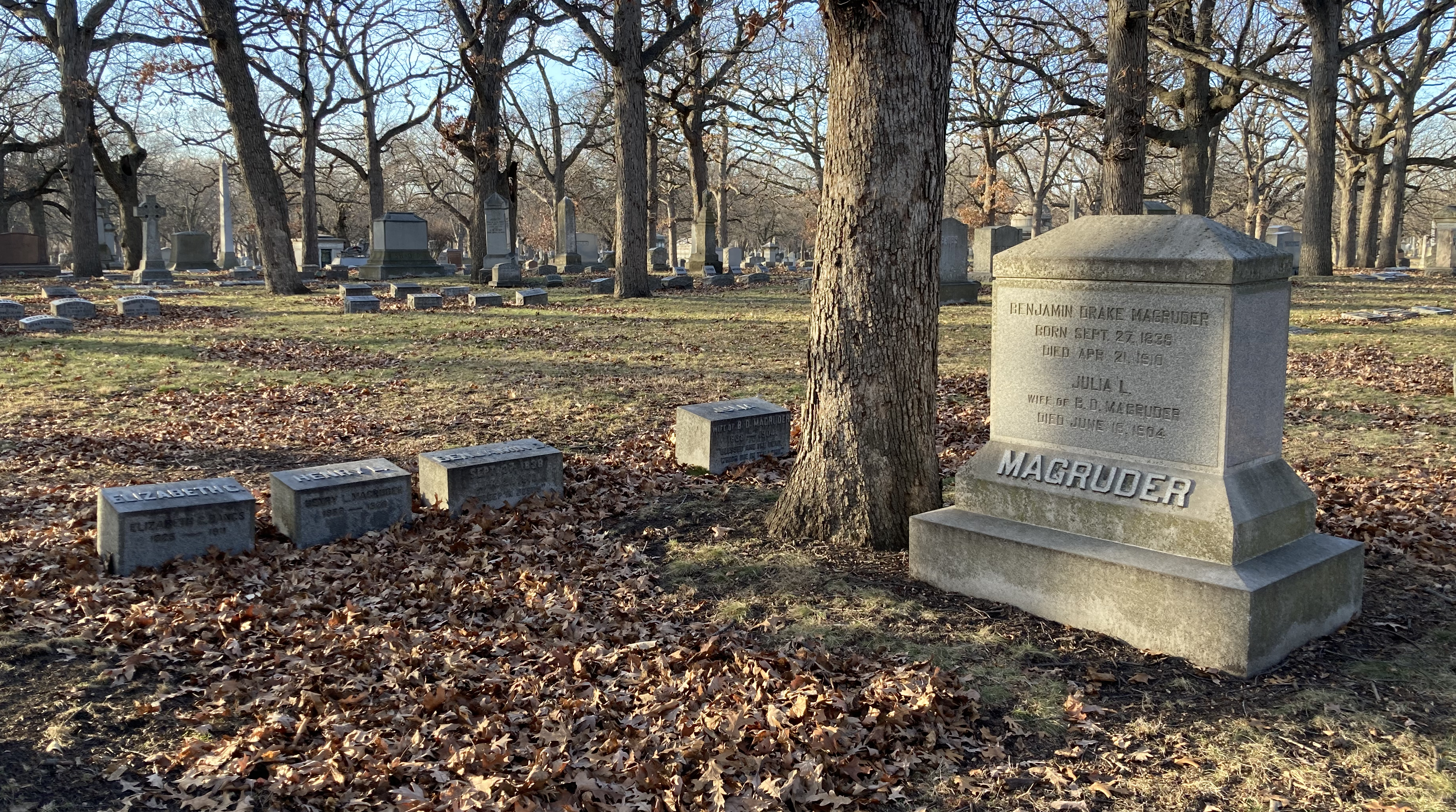
Magruder's grave at Rosehill Cemetery

Upon the death of Theophilus Lyle Dickey in 1885, Magruder was elected to fill his position in the Supreme Court of Illinois. After finishing the rest of Dickey's term, Magruder was elected to two more nine year terms. He served as chief justice in 1891, 1896, and 1902. His tenure on the court is best known for his decision in Illinois vs. August Spies et al. in 1887 to uphold the convictions against the Haymarket anarchists. Magruder also wrote the decision denying the creation of the Chicago Gas Trust Company, which would have monopolized the local illuminating gas trade. He was not nominated for re-election to the court in 1906. The Yale Law School conferred upon him an honorary Doctor of Laws degree later that year. Magruder then resumed practicing law.

Magruder married Julia Maria Latham, the daughter of Philip Clayton Latham, on June 15, 1864; they had a son and a daughter. He attended Fourth Presbyterian Church. He died in Chicago from Bright's disease on April 21, 1910. He was buried there in Rosehill Cemetery.
