= William Dever =

William Dever may refer to:

- William Emmett Dever (1862–1929), mayor of Chicago 1923–1926
- William G. Dever, Syro-Palestinian archaeologist
