= Philip Leo Sullivan =

American judge

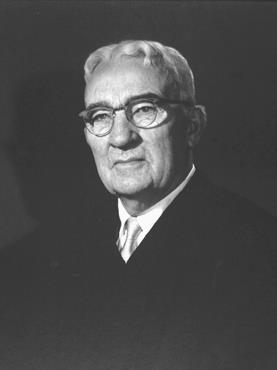

Chief Judge of the United States District Court for the Northern District of Illinois
- In office 1957–1959
- Preceded by: John P. Barnes
- Succeeded by: William Joseph Campbell

Judge of the United States District Court for the Northern District of Illinois
- In office November 8, 1933 – June 12, 1960
- Appointed by: Franklin D. Roosevelt
- Preceded by: George E. Q. Johnson
- Succeeded by: James Benton Parsons

Judge of the Circuit Court of Cook County
- In office 1921–1933

Personal details
- Born: Philip Leo Sullivan; October 2, 1889 Marengo, Illinois
- Died: June 12, 1960 (aged 70)
- Education: Loyola University Chicago School of Law (LL.B.)

Philip Leo Sullivan (October 2, 1889 – June 12, 1960) was a United States district judge of the United States District Court for the Northern District of Illinois.

== Education and career ==
Born in Marengo, Illinois, on October 2, 1889, Sullivan received a Bachelor of Laws from Loyola University Chicago School of Law in 1911. He was in private practice in Chicago, Illinois from 1911 to 1916. He was a master in chancery for the Superior Court of Cook County from 1916 to 1917 and again from 1919 to 1921. In the interim 1917 to 1919, Sullivan served as a field artillery lieutenant in the United States Army during World War I. He was elected a Judge of the Circuit Court of Cook County and served from 1921 until his appointment to the federal bench in 1933.

== Federal judicial service ==
Sullivan received a recess appointment from President Franklin D. Roosevelt on November 8, 1933, to a seat on the United States District Court for the Northern District of Illinois vacated by Judge George E. Q. Johnson. He was nominated to the same position by President Roosevelt on January 8, 1934. He was confirmed by the United States Senate on February 20, 1934, and received his commission on March 1, 1934. He served as Chief Judge from 1957 to 1959. His service terminated on June 12, 1960, due to his death.

== Sources ==
Legal offices
Preceded by George E. Q. Johnson	Judge of the United States District Court for the Northern District of Illinois; 1933–1960	Succeeded by James Benton Parsons
Preceded by John P. Barnes	Chief Judge of the United States District Court for the Northern District of Illinois; 1957–1959	Succeeded by William Joseph Campbell
