= William Joseph Campbell =

American judge

William Campbell
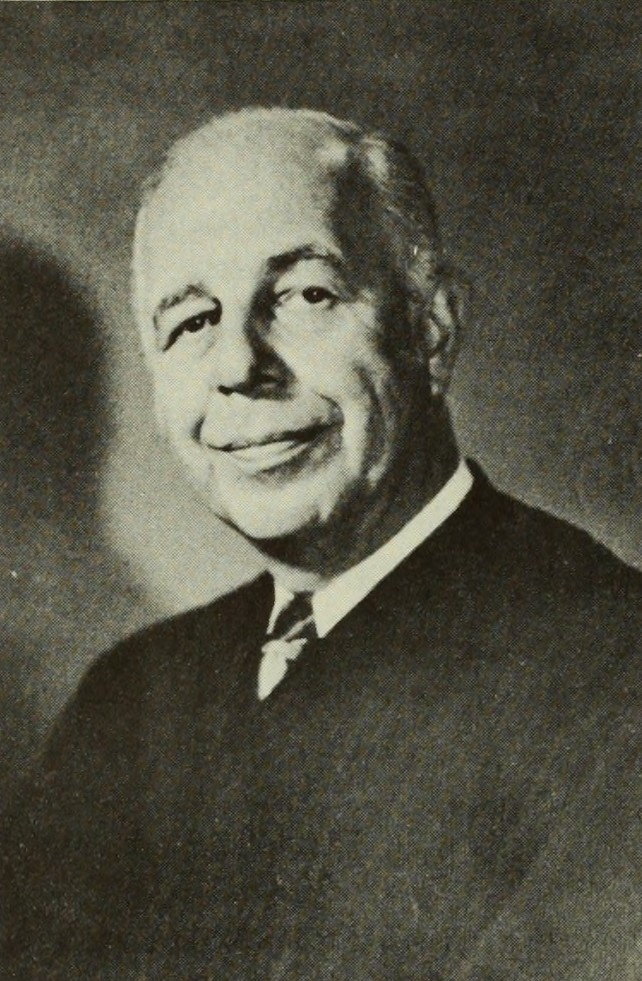

Senior Judge of the United States District Court for the Northern District of Illinois
- In office March 19, 1970 – October 19, 1988

Chief Judge of the United States District Court for the Northern District of Illinois
- In office 1959–1970
- Preceded by: Philip Leo Sullivan
- Succeeded by: Edwin Albert Robson

Judge of the United States District Court for the Northern District of Illinois
- In office October 10, 1940 – March 19, 1970
- Appointed by: Franklin D. Roosevelt
- Preceded by: Seat established
- Succeeded by: Thomas Roberts McMillen

Personal details
- Born: William Joseph Campbell; March 19, 1905 Chicago, Illinois, U.S.
- Died: October 19, 1988 (aged 83) West Palm Beach, Florida, U.S.
- Party: Democratic
- Spouse: Marie Cloherty (m. 1927)
- Children: 8, including Tom
- Education: Loyola University Chicago (LLB, LLM)

William Joseph Campbell (March 19, 1905 – October 19, 1988) was a United States district judge of the United States District Court for the Northern District of Illinois.

== Education and career ==
Campbell was born in Chicago, Illinois, and was a graduate of St. Rita of Cascia High School. He received a Bachelor of Laws from Loyola University Chicago School of Law in 1926 and a Master of Laws from the same school in 1928. Admitted to the Illinois Bar, he was an attorney for Travelers Insurance Company in Chicago from 1925 to 1930, Campbell was in private practice in Chicago until 1940, opening the firm of Campbell and Burns. The new firm's first major client was the Roman Catholic Archdiocese of Chicago. It was at this time that Campbell first got involved in Chicago Democratic politics. An early supporter of Franklin D. Roosevelt, Campbell formed the Young Democrats for Roosevelt in 1932. For his efforts he was named Illinois administrator for the President's National Youth Administration in 1935, where he served until 1938 when he was designated United States Attorney for the Northern District of Illinois where he served until 1940. As a federal prosecutor, he helped convict Al Capone of tax evasion and challenged the city's political leaders and their system of influence.

== Federal judicial service ==
Campbell was nominated by President Franklin D. Roosevelt on September 24, 1940, to the United States District Court for the Northern District of Illinois, to a new seat authorized by 54 Stat. 219. He was confirmed by the United States Senate on October 7, 1940, and received his commission on October 10, 1940. He served as a member of the Judicial Conference of the United States from 1958 to 1961, and as Chief Judge from 1959 to 1970. He assumed senior status on March 19, 1970. He served as Assistant Director of the Federal Judicial Center from 1971 to 1988. His service terminated on October 19, 1988, due to his death in West Palm Beach, Florida. At the time of his death, he was the longest-tenured federal judge in the United States.

=== Notable cases ===
Early in his time on the bench he conducted one of the few treason trials ever held in the United States. The case was a mass trial of the parents of Herbert Hans Haupt, his aunt and uncle, and two family friends.

Campbell won national praise for the severity of the sentences. However, on appeal, the entire group had their convictions reversed due to technical errors. Walter and Otto later pleaded guilty to misprision of treason and received 5-year sentences. Hans Haupt was retried, found guilty of treason once more, but received a life sentence. Charges were dropped against Lucille and Kate, albeit Erna Haupt was held until the war ended and deported in 1948. In 1957, Hans Haupt was granted clemency by President Dwight D. Eisenhower and deported to Germany on the condition that he would never return to the United States.

In 1965, Campbell took on Chicago kingpin Sam Giancana. When Giancana was asked to testify before a Chicago Grand Jury, he invoked his fifth amendment right to remain silent. Campbell granted Giancana immunity from prosecution and ordered him to testify. After Giancana refused, he spent the next year in jail on contempt charges.

== Supreme Court consideration ==
When Supreme Court Justice Arthur Goldberg stepped down 1965 to accept a diplomatic post, many thought Campbell was certain to be appointed to the Court by President Lyndon B. Johnson. Johnson instead chose Abe Fortas, who resigned four years later. When asked about the missed opportunity many years later, Campbell said, "Although I knew Johnson intimately and personally, he was bigoted enough not to want two Catholics on the Supreme Court."

== Controversy ==
Although Campbell is regarded as a forefather in the state of today's justice system, he has been criticized by some prominent investigative persons for his actions. In 1947, General Motors and a number of its allies in the scheme to buy out all trolley systems in the United States, using a number of front corporations (thereby wiping out railway competition with vehicle competition), were indicted on federal anti-trust charges. Two years later the workings were exposed during a trial in Chicago. The investigative journalist Jonathan Kwitny later argued that the case was "A fine example of what can happen when important matters of public policy are abandoned by government to the self-interest of corporations." Judge Campbell was not so outraged. As punishment, he ordered GM and the other companies to pay a fine of $5,000 each. The executives were fined $1 each. The actions by GM and its allies illegally created zero competition and opened the automobile production to America without further challenge.

== Award and honors ==
In 1970 the Library of the United States Courts of the Seventh Circuit was named "The William J. Campbell Library of the United States Courts".

Campbell also received the following recognition:

- Silver Buffalo Award, 1946
- Loyola University; LL.D. 1955
- Lincoln College; LL.D. 1960
- Duquesne College; Litt.D., 1965
- Barat College; J.C.D. 1966
- Chicagoan of the Year in 1965
- Lincoln Laureate in Law in 1970.
- Edward J. Devitt Distinguished Service to Justice Award, 1986.

== Family ==
In 1927, Campbell married Marie Agnes Cloherty of New York City. They had eight children, including Tom Campbell, who would serve as a Republican in the United States House of Representatives in California from 1989 to 1993 and 1995 to 2001 and the California State Senate from 1993 to 1995.

== See also ==
- List of United States federal judges by longevity of service
- Glasser v. United States

== Sources ==
Legal offices
New seat	Judge of the United States District Court for the Northern District of Illinois; 1940–1970	Succeeded by Thomas Roberts McMillen
Preceded by Philip Leo Sullivan	Chief Judge of the United States District Court for the Northern District of Illinois; 1959–1970	Succeeded by Edwin Albert Robson
