= George E. Q. Johnson =

American judge

Judge of the United States District Court for the Northern District of Illinois
- In office August 3, 1932 – March 3, 1933
- Appointed by: Herbert Hoover
- Preceded by: Seat established by 46 Stat. 1417
- Succeeded by: Philip Leo Sullivan

Personal details
- Born: George E. Q. Johnson; July 11, 1874 Lanyon, Iowa
- Died: September 19, 1949 (aged 75)
- Education: Tobin College (B.A.); Lake Forest College (LL.B.)

George E. Q. Johnson (July 11, 1874 – September 19, 1949) was a United States Attorney in Chicago, Illinois, who won tax evasion convictions of Al Capone and several of his associates. He briefly served as a United States district judge of the Northern District of Illinois.

== Education and career ==
Born in the unincorporated community of Lanyon, near Harcourt, Webster County, Iowa, Johnson received a Bachelor of Arts degree from Tobin College in Fort Dodge, Iowa, in 1897 and a Bachelor of Laws from Lake Forest College in 1900. He was in private practice in Illinois from 1900 to 1927. He was a master in chancery for the Circuit Court of Cook County, Illinois, from 1923 to 1927. He was the United States Attorney for the Northern District of Illinois from 1927 to 1932.

=== Capone prosecution ===
During his tenure as United States Attorney, Johnson was able to famously convict Al Capone for tax evasion. He had earlier won tax evasion convictions of Capone henchmen Ralph "Bottles" Capone, Sam Guzick, and Frank Nitti.

== Federal judicial service ==
Johnson received a recess appointment from President Herbert Hoover on August 3, 1932, to the United States District Court for the Northern District of Illinois, to a new seat authorized by 46 Stat. 1417. He was nominated to the same position by President Hoover on December 7, 1932. The United States Senate never voted on his nomination. His service terminated on March 3, 1933, with the sine die adjournment of the second session of the 72nd United States Congress.

== Post judicial service and death ==
After leaving the federal bench, Johnson returned to private practice in Illinois until his death on September 19, 1949.

== Sources ==
Legal offices
Preceded by Seat established by 46 Stat. 1417	Judge of the United States District Court for the Northern District of Illinois; 1932–1933	Succeeded by Philip Leo Sullivan
