= Nathaniel C. Sears =

- Illustration of Sears, circa 1897

Chief Judge of the Illinois Appellate Court for Cook County
- In office 1902–1903

Judge of the Illinois Appellate Court for Cook County
- In office 1897–1903

Judge of the Cook County Superior Court
- In office 1893–1897

Personal details
- Born: August 23, 1854 Gallipolis, Ohio
- Died: May 7, 1934 (aged 79) Daytona Beach, Florida
- Resting place: Lake Geneva, Wisconsin
- Party: Republican
- Spouse(s): Mattie Barclay (d.); Laura Raymond Davidson (m. 1887, d. 1930)
- Education: Amherst College (A.B. & A.M.); Northwestern University (LL.D)

Nathaniel Clinton Sears (August 23, 1854 – May 7, 1934) was an American judge, lawyer, and politician. Sears served as a judge elected the Superior Court of Cook County (1893–1897) and appointed to the Illinois Appellate Court for Cook County (1897–1903). He served as chief judge of the latter court.

Sears was the Republican Party nominee in the 1897 Chicago mayoral election, and was also a member of Chicago Board of Education.

== Early life, education, and career ==
Sears was born August 23, 1854 in Gallipolis, Ohio, where his father worked as the principal of a preparatory school. His family's has roots that can be traced back to the American Revolution, including to Ebenezer Sears (who was one of George Washington's troops).

Sears graduated from Elgin Academy in Elgin, Illinois. He received his post-secondary education at Knox College and Amherst College. At Amherst College, he received an A.B. and A.M. degree. He graduated with high honors at Amherst College at the age of 21, and spent the next two years studying international and Roman law in Germany at University of Göttingen, Heidelberg University, and the University of Berlin. He subsequently received a Doctor of Laws from Northwestern University.

In 1877, Sears entered the Chicago law office of Willimam H. King, and the following year was admitted to the Illinois bar. Sears practiced law for the next fifteen years, until being elected judge. He was a counsel in several prominent criminal cases.

== Judge of the Cook County Superior Court (1893–97) ==
In 1893, Sears was elected to the Cook County Superior Court. His successful judicial campaign was his first time running for public office.

== 1897 mayoral candidacy ==
Illustration of Sears, circa 1900

Sears was the nominee of the Republican Party in Chicago's 1897 mayoral election. He was unsuccessful in his bid; the Republican vote was split in the general election due to the presence of multiple independent candidates on the ballot. Sears remained prominent in Republican politics in the years following his mayoral campaign.

== Judge of the Illinois Appellate Court for Cook County (1897–1903) ==
From 1897 to 1903, Sears served as a judge on the Illinois Appellate Court for Cook County, having been appointed to the bench. In 1900, Sears was appointed to remain on the appellate bench. He was made the court's chief judge in 1902. He resigned from the bench in 1903, and returned to private legal practice.

== Subsequent career ==
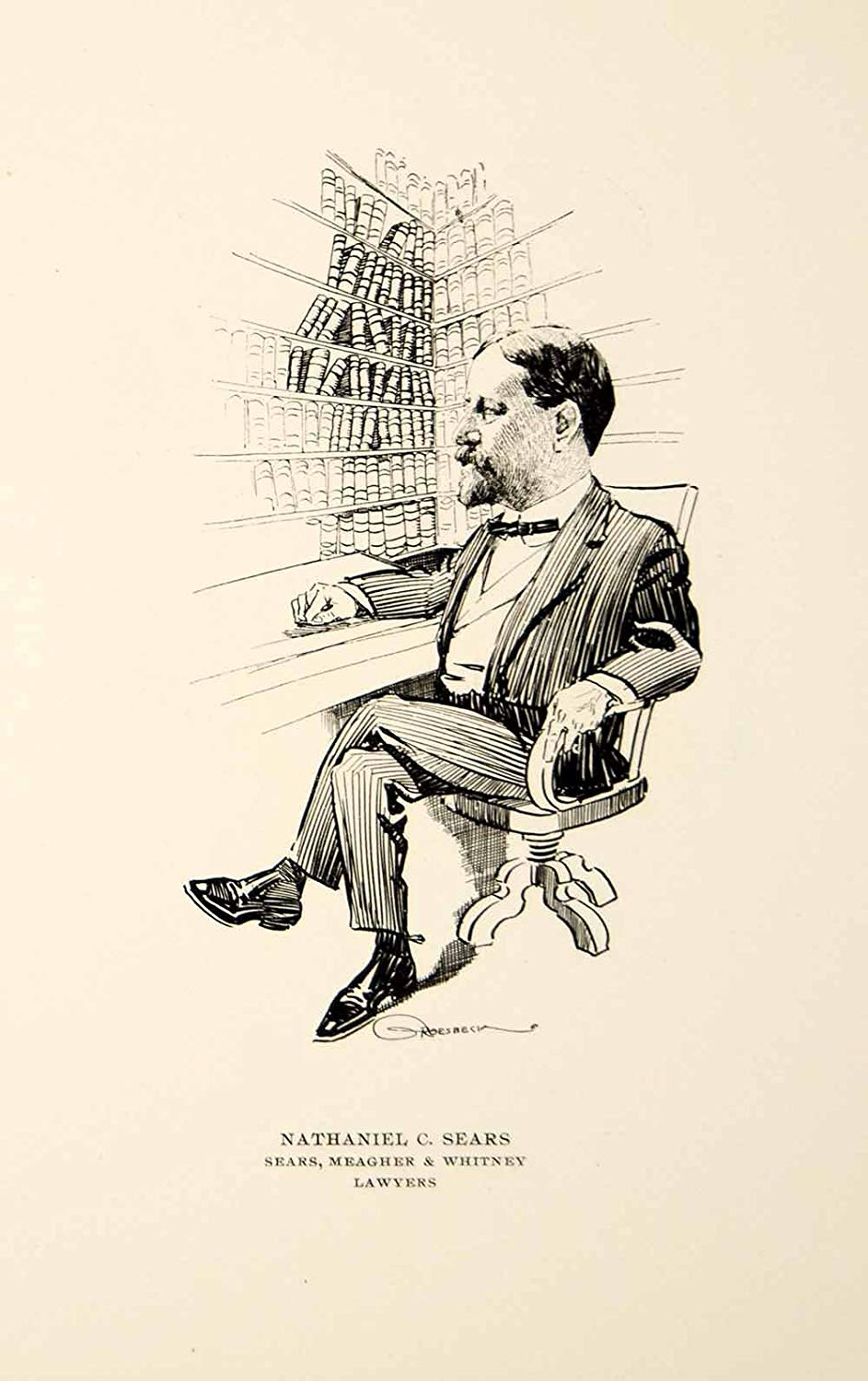
1904 lithograph of Sears

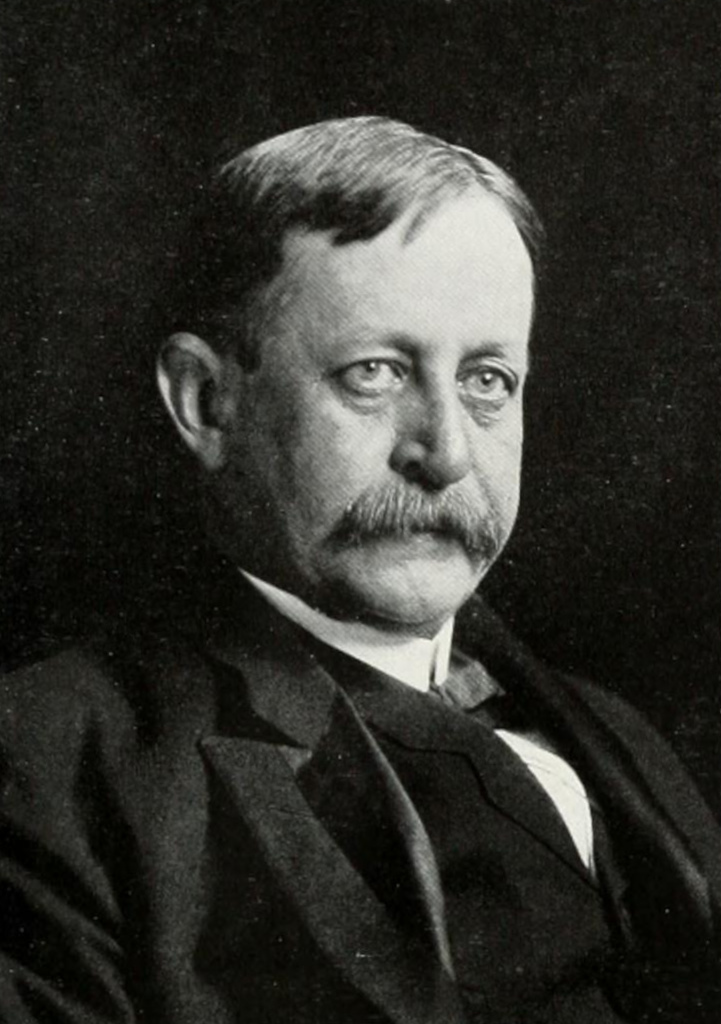
Portrait photograph of Sears

Returning to private practice, Sears joined a firm that became known as Sears, Meagher & Whitney. He became well-esteemed for his work in corporate law. He retired circa 1922, after his wife became ill.

In 1905, Sears used $500,000 in capital to found the American Mutual Life Insurance Company, a life insurance company headquartered in Chicago.

Sears served as a member of the Chicago Board of Education.

== Personal life ==
Sears's first wife was the former Mattie Barclay of Eglin, who died soon after their wedding. On May 26, 1887, Sears re-married, to the former Laura Raymond Davidson of Elgin. Sears lived in Chicago's Edgewater neighborhood. For his final forty years of life, Sears owned a winter home in Florida. Sears also owned a summer home in Lake Geneva, Wisconsin.

Sears was a 33rd degree Mason, a Knight Templar, and an Odd Fellow. Sears served as president of Amherst College's Western Alumni Association. He was also a member of the Press Club of Chicago, Union League Club of Chicago, and Congregational Club of Chicago.

Sears was a major benefactor to the Elgin Academy. Not only was Sears an alumnus of the school, but his parents had been principal and co-principal at that school, and his wife had worked as a teacher there. After his wife's death in 1930, in her memory Sears donated a large art museum established at the school. The museum was named the "Laura Davidson Sears Academy of Fine Arts." Sears was an avid collector of early American art, and much of the museum's sizable collection were works he donated from his own private collection. Among the donated works was a Gilbert Stuart portrait of George Washington.

In Sears's final two years, he had become partially paralyzed.

Sears died at the age of 79 of a heart attack on May 7, 1934, while at his winter residence in Daytona Beach, Florida. His funeral was held at the First Congregational church in Elgin, and his burial was at a cemetery in Lake Geneva.
