= Beazley Institute for Health Law and Policy =

Coordinates: 41°53′50″N 87°37′38″W

The Beazley Institute for Health Law and Policy opened at Loyola University Chicago School of Law in 1984, responding to the need for an academic forum to study the burgeoning field of health law and to foster a dialogue between legal and health care professionals.

== Degree programs ==
- M.J. or Master of Jurisprudence in Health Law for health care professionals
- LL.M. or Master of Laws in Health Law for attorneys
- D.Law or Doctor of Laws in Health Law and Policy for health care professionals
- S.J.D. or Doctor of Juridical Sciences in Health Law and Policy for attorneys
- Certificate in Health Law for Juris Doctor candidates

== Benefactors ==
Thanks to a $5 million gift from alumnus and friend Bernard Beazley and his wife, Kathleen, Loyola University Chicago School of Law has significantly expanded its nationally ranked Beazley Institute for Health Law and Policy to better serve its students and alumni, the legal profession and the community. A 1950 Loyola Law graduate, Mr. Beazley is the former general counsel and senior vice president of Dentsply International, one of the largest professional dental products companies in the world. He has served on Loyola's President's Advisory Council and is a member of the Shield of Loyola University Chicago, the planned giving society.

== Resources ==
=== Main sites ===
- Beazley Institute for Health Law and Policy
- Loyola University Chicago School of Law
- Loyola University Chicago Water Tower Campus
