= Loyola Consumer Law Review =

- Discipline: Consumer Law
- Language: English

Publication details
- History: Fall 1987 – present
- Publisher: Loyola University Chicago School of Law (USA)
- Frequency: Quarterly

Standard abbreviations
- Bluebook: Loy. Consumer L. Rev.
- ISO 4: Loyola Consum. Law Rev.

Indexing
- ISSN: 1530-5449

Links
- Journal homepage

The Loyola Consumer Law Review (CLR), is a student-run legal journal affiliated with the Loyola University Chicago School of Law. Established in 1988 as the Loyola Consumer Law Reporter, the publication focuses on legal issues and their relationship to and effect on consumers. On the 10th anniversary of its publication, in 1998, the Loyola Consumer Law Reporter officially became the Loyola Consumer Law Review. CLR is the only law review in the country that is dedicated to examining legal issues as they relate to consumers. The publication provides a forum for dialogue among those in the field including practitioners and law professors. It aims to be approachable to a wide audience and relies on fewer footnotes than the average legal journal.

Each volume of the publication is composed of four issues. The Loyola Consumer Law Review is currently producing Volume 23.

== Editors-in-chief ==
Because the Loyola Consumer Law Review is student-run, each year the publication has had a different editor-in-chief. Previous CLR Editors-in-Chief include the following list.

Volume	Dates	Name
25	2012–2013	Leslie Cornell
24	2011–2012	Brad Lorden
23	2010–2011	Peter Matejcak
22	2009–2010	Sarah Tennant
21	2008–2009	Peter Bergan
20	2007–2008	Jeffrey M. Sussman
19	2006–2007	Dara S. Chevlin
18	2005–2006	Eric T. Blum
17	2004–2005	Amanda Adams
16	2003–2004	James Michel
15	2002–2003	Heather E. Nolan
14	2001–2002	Randy M. Awdish
13	2000–2001	Jennifer K. Gust
12	1999–2000	Lynn Hanley
11	1998–1999	Jeremy Stephenson
10	1997–1998	Jeremy Stephenson (Issue 4); Tisha Pates Underwood (Issues 1–3)
9	1996–1997	Tisha Pates Underwood (Issue 4); Glen S. Thomas (Issues 1–3)
8	1995–1996	Glen S. Thomas (Issue 4); Janet Garetto (Issue 3); Heather Shore (Issues 1–2)
7	1994–1995	W. Matthew Bryant
6	1993–1994	Julia C. McLaughlin
5	1992–1993	Allison Despard
4	1991–1992	Pamela B. Hall
3	1990–1991	David V. Goodsir
2	1989–1990	David Colaric
1	1988–1989	Vivian R. Hessel
