= Gary Feinerman =

American judge (born 1965)

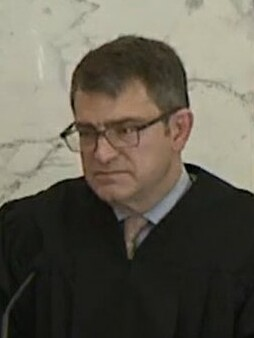
- Feinerman in 2022

Judge of the United States District Court for the Northern District of Illinois
- In office June 29, 2010 – December 31, 2022
- Appointed by: Barack Obama
- Preceded by: Robert Gettleman
- Succeeded by: Jeremy C. Daniel

Personal details
- Born: Gary Scott Feinerman; February 19, 1965 (age 61) Skokie, Illinois, U.S.
- Education: Yale University (BA); Stanford University (JD)

Gary Scott Feinerman (born February 19, 1965) is a former United States district judge of the United States District Court for the Northern District of Illinois.

== Early life and education ==
Feinerman earned a Bachelor of Arts in 1987 from Yale University. He graduated from Stanford Law School with a Juris Doctor in 1991, where he finished second in his class and was a member of the Stanford Law Review and Order of the Coif.

From 1991 until 1992, Feinerman worked as a law clerk to Judge Joel Flaum of the United States Court of Appeals for the Seventh Circuit. From 1992 until 1993, Feinerman worked as an associate in the Chicago law firm of Mayer Brown. From 1993 until 1994, Feinerman worked as a law clerk for Justice Anthony Kennedy of the Supreme Court of the United States.

== Career ==
From 1994 until 1996, Feinerman worked for the United States Department of Justice as counsel to the Office of Policy Development and also on detail to the Office of the Counsel of the President in 1995. From 1996 until 1999, Feinerman again worked as an associate for the Chicago law firm Mayer, Brown, Rowe & Maw. He served as a partner at the firm from 2000 to 2003. While at Mayer Brown, Feinerman performed pro bono work for the NAACP. From 2003 to 2007, Feinerman worked in the office of the Illinois Attorney General as the state's solicitor general. On November 5, 2003, Feinerman argued before the U.S. Supreme Court for petitioner in Illinois v. Lidster. The Court ultimately voted 6–3 for Illinois, holding that police departments may set up roadblocks to question motorists with no individual or collective suspicion of criminal activity, but rather to collect information about a recent hit-and-run accident. In 2007, Feinerman joined the Chicago law firm Sidley Austin as a partner, where he worked until becoming a United States district judge.

=== Federal judicial service ===
In 2009, Feinerman applied for a vacant federal judgeship in Chicago. In August 2009, Feinerman's name was one of seven that Senator Dick Durbin submitted to the White House. On February 24, 2010, President Barack Obama formally nominated Feinerman for the vacancy created by Judge Robert Gettleman, who assumed senior status in May 2009. On April 15, 2010, the United States Senate Committee on the Judiciary reported Feinerman's nomination out of committee. The United States Senate confirmed Feinerman on June 28, 2010 by an 80–0 vote, and he received his commission the next day. He resigned on December 31, 2022.

=== Notable rulings ===
In 2020, Feinerman vacated a policy implemented by the Trump administration that permitted immigration officials to deny green cards to applicants by creating a wealth test for individuals seeking permanent residency in the United States.

== Post-judicial career ==
Since his resignation, Feinerman returned to private practice as a partner in Latham & Watkins at their Chicago office.

== See also ==
- List of law clerks for the first seat of the Supreme Court of the United States

Legal offices
Preceded by Robert Gettleman	Judge of the United States District Court for the Northern District of Illinois; 2010–2022	Succeeded by Jeremy C. Daniel
