= John F. Grady =

American judge (1929–2019)

John Francis Grady
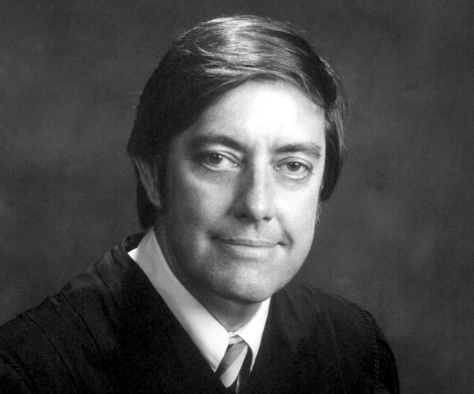

Senior Judge of the United States District Court for the Northern District of Illinois
- In office May 23, 1994 – December 2, 2019

Chief Judge of the United States District Court for the Northern District of Illinois
- In office 1986–1990
- Preceded by: Frank James McGarr
- Succeeded by: James Byron Moran

Judge of the United States District Court for the Northern District of Illinois
- In office November 21, 1975 – May 23, 1994
- Appointed by: Gerald Ford
- Preceded by: Edwin Albert Robson
- Succeeded by: Robert Gettleman

Personal details
- Born: John Francis Grady; May 23, 1929 Chicago, Illinois, U.S.
- Died: December 2, 2019 (aged 90) Wilmette, Illinois, U.S.
- Education: Northwestern University (B.S.); Northwestern University Pritzker School of Law (J.D.)

John Francis Grady (May 23, 1929 – December 2, 2019) was a United States district judge of the United States District Court for the Northern District of Illinois.

== Education and career ==
Born in Chicago, Illinois, Grady attended Lake Forest Academy, a nationally known private school for boys, and graduated in 1948. He subsequently received a Bachelor of Science degree from Northwestern University in 1952 and a Juris Doctor from Northwestern University Pritzker School of Law in 1954. He was in private practice in Chicago from 1954 to 1956. He was Chief of the Criminal Division in the Office of the United States Attorney for the Northern District of Illinois from 1956 to 1961. He returned to private practice in Waukegan, Illinois from 1961 to 1976.

== Federal judicial service ==
On October 20, 1975, Grady was nominated by President Gerald Ford to a seat on the United States District Court for the Northern District of Illinois vacated by Judge Edwin Albert Robson. Grady was confirmed by the United States Senate on November 20, 1975, and received his commission on November 21, 1975. He served as Chief Judge from 1986 to 1990, and assumed senior status on May 23, 1994. He took inactive senior status on January 30, 2015. His service terminated on December 2, 2019, due to his death at his home in Wilmette, Illinois.

== See also ==
- List of United States federal judges by longevity of service

== Sources ==
Legal offices
Preceded by Edwin Albert Robson	Judge of the United States District Court for the Northern District of Illinois; 1975–1994	Succeeded by Robert Gettleman
Preceded by Frank James McGarr	Chief Judge of the United States District Court for the Northern District of Illinois; 1986–1990	Succeeded by James Byron Moran
