= Frank James McGarr =

American judge (1921–2012)

Frank McGarr

Senior Judge of the United States District Court for the Northern District of Illinois
- In office June 30, 1986 – January 15, 1988

Chief Judge of the United States District Court for the Northern District of Illinois
- In office 1981–1986
- Preceded by: James Benton Parsons
- Succeeded by: John Francis Grady

Judge of the United States District Court for the Northern District of Illinois
- In office October 14, 1970 – June 30, 1986
- Appointed by: Richard Nixon
- Preceded by: Seat established
- Succeeded by: James Zagel

Personal details
- Born: Frank James McGarr; February 25, 1921; Chicago, Illinois, U.S.
- Died: January 6, 2012 (aged 90); Downers Grove, Illinois, U.S.
- Political party: Republican
- Education: Loyola University Chicago (BA, JD)

Frank James McGarr (February 25, 1921 – January 6, 2012) was a United States district judge of the United States District Court for the Northern District of Illinois.

== Education and career ==
Born in Chicago, Illinois, McGarr attended St. Ignatius College Prep high school in Chicago and received an Artium Baccalaureus degree from Loyola University Chicago in 1942. McGarr served in the United States Navy for the remainder of World War II, from 1942 to 1945. He received a Juris Doctor from Loyola University Chicago School of Law in 1950. McGarr was an assistant to the President of Loyola University Chicago from 1946 to 1952. He was in private practice in Chicago from 1952 to 1954. He was the First Assistant United States Attorney of the Northern District of Illinois from 1954 to 1958. He was in private practice in Chicago from 1958 to 1969. He was the first assistant state attorney general of Illinois from 1969 to 1970.

== Federal judicial service ==
McGarr was nominated by President Richard Nixon on September 22, 1970, to the United States District Court for the Northern District of Illinois, to a new seat created by 84 Stat. 294. He was confirmed by the United States Senate on October 8, 1970, and received his commission on October 14, 1970. He served as Chief Judge from 1981 to 1986. He assumed senior status on June 30, 1986. McGarr served in that capacity until January 15, 1988, due to retirement.

== Post-judicial career ==
After leaving the federal bench in 1988, McGarr went into private practice with the Chicago law firm of Phelan, Pope & John.

== Illness and death ==
In recent years, McGarr had suffered from Parkinson's disease. He died on January 6, 2012, at his home in Downers Grove, Illinois, of complications from the disease.

== Sources ==
Legal offices
| New seat | Judge of the United States District Court for the Northern District of Illinois; 1970–1986 | Succeeded by James Zagel |
| Preceded by James Benton Parsons | Chief Judge of the United States District Court for the Northern District of Illinois; 1981–1986 | Succeeded by John Francis Grady |
