= James Benton Parsons =

American judge

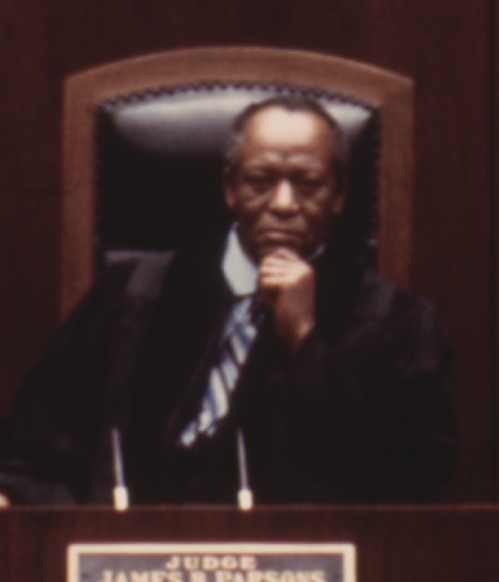

Senior Judge of the United States District Court for the Northern District of Illinois
- In office August 30, 1981 – June 19, 1993

Chief Judge of the United States District Court for the Northern District of Illinois
- In office 1975–1981
- Preceded by: Edwin Albert Robson
- Succeeded by: Frank James McGarr

Judge of the United States District Court for the Northern District of Illinois
- In office August 30, 1961 – August 30, 1981
- Appointed by: John F. Kennedy
- Preceded by: Philip Leo Sullivan
- Succeeded by: Paul Edward Plunkett

Judge of the Superior Court of Cook County
- In office 1960–1981

Personal details
- Born: James Benton Parsons; August 13, 1911 Kansas City, Missouri, U.S.
- Died: June 19, 1993 (aged 81) Chicago, Illinois, U.S.
- Resting place: Greenwood Cemetery; Decatur, Illinois
- Education: Millikin University (BA); University of Chicago (MA, JD)

James Benton Parsons (August 13, 1911 – June 19, 1993) was a United States district judge of the United States District Court for the Northern District of Illinois. He was the first African American to serve as a judge in a U.S. district court.

== Early life, education and career ==
Born on August 13, 1911, in Kansas City, Missouri, his family moved to St. Louis, Missouri, where his father was an evangelist and missionary with the Disciples of Christ Church. The family subsequently lived in Lexington, Kentucky, Dayton, Ohio and Bloomington, Indiana, before settling in Decatur, Illinois. Parsons wanted to be an attorney by the time he was in junior high school. He was named "class orator" for Stephen Decatur High School class of 1929, the "first race student" to receive this honor. He was on the basketball team at Stephen Decatur High School coached by Gay Kintner, and also in the school band and orchestra. He earned a Bachelor of Arts degree from Millikin University in 1934.

Parsons first started working as acting head of music at Lincoln University in Missouri. He met Nathaniel Dett, a former teacher at Lincoln, who had returned for a guest performance. Dett subsequently offered Parsons a job at Bennett College, a historically black college in Greensboro, North Carolina, where he was director of music. He wanted Parsons to re-score some of Dett's chorales. By 1939, Parsons had become director of instrumental music for Greensboro's Negro public schools, as the state had a segregated public school system. Under his direction, the band at James B. Dudley High School became known throughout the state for its expert musicianship and precision marching.

== World War II military service ==
During World War II, Parsons enlisted in the United States Naval Reserve in May 1942. Serving as a Musician MUS1, he directed the U.S. Navy B-1 Fleet Band. The band was organized from a core of members of the bands at Dudley High School and North Carolina A&T State University. B-1 was composed of the first African Americans to serve in the modern Navy at a rank higher than messman. It was one of more than 100 bands of African Americans organized by the Navy during the war; the other bands all trained at Camp Robert Smalls. B-1 trained at Norfolk and was stationed at Chapel Hill, North Carolina, where it was attached to the Navy's pre-flight school on the University of North Carolina campus.

In May 1944 the band was transferred to the United States Naval base at Pearl Harbor, Hawaii, where it was stationed at Manana Barracks.This held the largest posting of African-American servicemen in the world. While there, Parsons was selected for a panel of judges that was convened by the Navy to investigate the 1944 riot in Guam among Marines. This experience furthered his interest in studying law. Throughout his service, Parsons directed B-1, but he mustered out of the Navy in 1945 as a Musician 1st class, never having made the officer's grade. He and his men believed that he had earned that.

== Later education and career ==
After the war, Parsons used the GI Bill to earn his Master of Arts degree from the University of Chicago in 1946, followed by a J.D. degree from the University of Chicago Law School in 1949. Parsons entered private practice in Chicago, Illinois from 1949 to 1951, also serving as an assistant corporation counsel during that time. He was appointed as an Assistant United States Attorney of the Northern District of Illinois, serving from 1951 to 1960. He was a judge of the Superior Court of Cook County, Illinois from 1960 to 1961.

== Federal judicial service ==
Parsons was nominated by President John F. Kennedy on August 10, 1961, to a seat on the United States District Court for the Northern District of Illinois vacated by Judge Philip Leo Sullivan. He was confirmed by the United States Senate on August 30, 1961, and received his commission the same day, becoming the first African American to serve as a U.S. district judge in a U.S. district court. He served as Chief Judge from 1975 to 1981 and served as a member of the Judicial Conference of the United States from 1975 to 1978. He assumed senior status on August 30, 1981. His service terminated on June 19, 1993, due to his death in Chicago. He was interred at Greenwood Cemetery in Decatur.

== See also ==
- List of African-American federal judges
- List of African-American jurists
- List of first minority male lawyers and judges in the United States
- List of first minority male lawyers and judges in Illinois

== Sources ==
Legal offices
Preceded by Philip Leo Sullivan	Judge of the United States District Court for the Northern District of Illinois; 1961–1981	Succeeded by Paul Edward Plunkett
Preceded by Edwin Albert Robson	Chief Judge of the United States District Court for the Northern District of Illinois; 1975–1981	Succeeded by Frank James McGarr
