= Thomas Roberts McMillen =

American judge

Senior Judge of the United States District Court for the Northern District of Illinois
- In office December 31, 1984 – September 8, 1985

Judge of the United States District Court for the Northern District of Illinois
- In office April 23, 1971 – December 31, 1984
- Appointed by: Richard Nixon
- Preceded by: William Joseph Campbell
- Succeeded by: Suzanne B. Conlon

Judge of the Circuit Court of Cook County
- In office 1966–1971

Personal details
- Born: Thomas Roberts McMillen; June 8, 1916 Decatur, Illinois
- Died: September 16, 2002 (aged 86) Evanston, Illinois
- Cause of death: complications following stroke
- Resting place: Winnetka Congregational Church,Winnetka IL
- Citizenship: U.S.
- Party: Republican
- Spouse: Anne Ford “Nan” McMillen
- Education: Princeton University (A.B.); Harvard Law School (LL.B.)

Thomas Roberts McMillen (June 8, 1916 – September 16, 2002) was a United States district judge of the United States District Court for the Northern District of Illinois.

== Education and career ==
McMillen was born in Decatur, Illinois, on June 8, 1916. He received an Artium Baccalaureus degree from Princeton University in 1938 and a Bachelor of Laws from Harvard Law School in 1941, after which he joined the United States Army, serving until 1945. He entered private practice in Chicago, Illinois in 1946. In 1966, McMillen became a judge of the Circuit Court of Cook County, serving until his appointment to the federal bench. He presided over the bankruptcy of the Chicago, Milwaukee, St. Paul and Pacific Railroad ("Milwaukee Road") from 1977 until its sale to the Soo Line Railroad in 1986.

== Federal judicial service ==
McMillen was nominated by President Richard Nixon on March 29, 1971, to a seat vacated by Judge William Joseph Campbell on the United States District Court for the Northern District of Illinois. He was confirmed on April 21, 1971, and received his commission on April 23, 1971. He assumed senior status on December 31, 1984. McMillen served in that capacity until he retired on September 8, 1985, and returned to private practice. He died in Evanston, Illinois, on September 16, 2002.

== Sources ==
Legal offices
Preceded by William Joseph Campbell	Judge of the United States District Court for the Northern District of Illinois; 1971–1984	Succeeded by Suzanne B. Conlon
