= Winfred George Knoch =

American judge (1895–1983)

Senior Judge of the United States Court of Appeals for the Seventh Circuit
- In office December 4, 1967 – May 23, 1983

Judge of the United States Court of Appeals for the Seventh Circuit
- In office August 21, 1958 – December 4, 1967
- Appointed by: Dwight D. Eisenhower
- Preceded by: Walter C. Lindley
- Succeeded by: Otto Kerner Jr.

Judge of the United States District Court for the Northern District of Illinois
- In office May 14, 1953 – September 14, 1958
- Appointed by: Dwight D. Eisenhower
- Preceded by: Seat established by 64 Stat. 443
- Succeeded by: Edwin Albert Robson

Personal details
- Born: Winfred George Knoch; May 24, 1895 Naperville, Illinois, U.S.
- Died: May 23, 1983 (aged 87)
- Education: DePaul University College of Law (LLB)

Winfred George Knoch (May 24, 1895 – May 23, 1983) was a United States circuit judge of the United States Court of Appeals for the Seventh Circuit and previously was a United States district judge of the United States District Court for the Northern District of Illinois.

== Education and career ==
Born in Naperville, Illinois, Knoch received a Bachelor of Laws from DePaul University College of Law in 1917. He immediately entered private practice in Naperville, but served as a lieutenant in the United States Army infantry during World War I, from 1917 to 1919. He then returned to private practice until 1930, also serving as an assistant state's attorney of DuPage County, Illinois from 1922 to 1930. He was a Judge in DuPage County from 1930 to 1939, and on the 16th Judicial Circuit Court of Illinois from 1939 to 1953.

== Federal judicial service ==
Knoch was nominated by President Dwight D. Eisenhower on April 27, 1953, to the United States District Court for the Northern District of Illinois, to a new seat authorized by 64 Stat. 443. He was confirmed by the United States Senate on May 13, 1953, and received his commission the next day. His service terminated on September 14, 1958, due to his elevation to the Seventh Circuit.

Knoch was nominated by President Eisenhower on August 16, 1958, to a seat on the United States Court of Appeals for the Seventh Circuit vacated by Judge Walter C. Lindley. He was confirmed by the Senate on August 19, 1958, and received commission on August 21, 1958. He assumed senior status on December 4, 1967. His service terminated on May 23, 1983, due to his death.

== Sources ==
Legal offices
Preceded by Seat established by 64 Stat. 443	Judge of the United States District Court for the Northern District of Illinois; 1953–1958	Succeeded by Edwin Albert Robson
Preceded by Walter C. Lindley	Judge of the United States Court of Appeals for the Seventh Circuit; 1958–1967	Succeeded by Otto Kerner Jr.
