= Philip H. Corboy =

American lawyer

- Born: Philip Harnett Corboy; August 12, 1924; Chicago, Illinois, U.S.
- Died: June 12, 2012 (aged 87); Chicago, Illinois, U.S.
- Resting place: Holy Name Cathedral, Chicago, Illinois
- Education: St. Ambrose College (did not graduate); Notre Dame (did not graduate); Loyola University Chicago School of Law
- Occupation: Lawyer
- Years active: 1949–2012
- Board member of: Corboy & Demetrio, See Later Career and Boards
- Spouses: Doris Corboy (div. 1985); Mary Dempsey (m. 1992)

Philip Harnett Corboy (August 12, 1924 – June 12, 2012) was an American trial lawyer who was involved in personal injury, wrongful death and medical malpractice cases across the United States for more than half a century. He founded the Philip H. Corboy & Associates law firm which later became Corboy & Demetrio. Former Loyola University Chicago School of Law Dean, David Yellen, stated: "There are very few living lawyers who have had the kind of impact Phil Corboy has. He largely transformed the practice of personal injury law. He was a teacher and mentor to a couple of generations of leading lawyers in the country." His career was featured in a cover article in Chicago Lawyer entitled "Corboy College: Chicago Trial Lawyers' Alma Mater".

== Career ==
The National Law Journal listed Corboy as one of the top 100 most influential lawyers in America, and one of the nation's top 15 trial lawyers; Chicago Magazine included him in its lists, The Power 100 and Power Lawyers, and called him one of the 30 toughest lawyers in Chicago. Law & Business listed him as one of America's top trial lawyers. He has been in The Best Lawyers in America book since its inception in 1987.

Corboy wrote more than 100 articles on legal and business topics and has been the subject of news and features in many publications and television shows. He has appeared on 20/20, 60 Minutes, Face the Nation, Nightline with Ted Koppel, and The Oprah Winfrey Show.

Corboy was a lecturer and panelist at legal, medical and insurance meetings and conventions around the world and profiles have been written about him by the Wall Street Journal, USA Today, Chicago Magazine, and the Chicago Tribune.

Since 1995, the Philip H. Corboy Fellowship in Trial Advocacy program at Loyola University Chicago School of Law has supported and trained law students to become trial lawyers. In 2010, he and his wife, Mary Dempsey, made the largest single gift ever to the Loyola University Chicago School of Law. In recognition, Loyola renamed its law school building the Philip H. Corboy Law Center. In addition to numerous honors from religious organizations, legal associations and publications, Corboy was awarded an honorary Doctor of Law Degree from the John Marshall Law School and St. Ambrose University.

== Later career and boards ==
He was a president of the Chicago Bar Association and the Illinois Trial Lawyers Association and a former chairman of the Section on Litigation of the American Bar Association. Corboy served as general counsel for the Illinois Democratic Party and has served on the boards of directors of business, legal and charitable groups and as a member of task forces for courts, judicial and medical-related entities. He was also active in national and international associations such as the Inner Circle of Advocates, International Academy of Trial Lawyers, American College of Trial Lawyers, International Society of Barristers, American Board of Trial Advocates, and American Association for Justice.

== Death ==
Corboy died at home in Chicago on June 12, 2012, at age 87. He had five children, Phillip Jr., John, Thomas, Joan, and Robert. Joan and Robert predeceased their father.
