= Otto Kerner Jr. =

American jurist and politician (1908–1976)

Otto Kerner
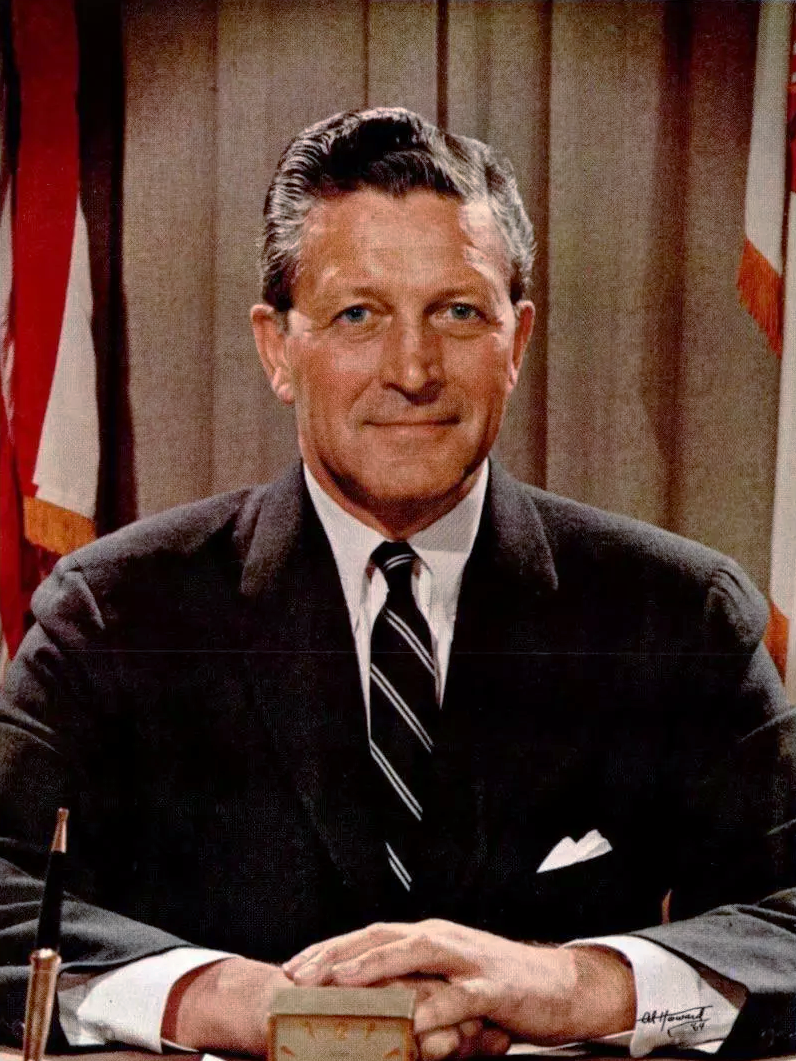
- Official portrait, c. 1963

Judge of the United States Court of Appeals for the Seventh Circuit
- In office April 22, 1968 – July 22, 1974
- Appointed by: Lyndon B. Johnson
- Preceded by: Winfred George Knoch
- Succeeded by: William J. Bauer

33rd Governor of Illinois
- In office January 9, 1961 – May 21, 1968
- Lieutenant: Samuel H. Shapiro
- Preceded by: William Stratton
- Succeeded by: Samuel H. Shapiro

United States Attorney for the Northern District of Illinois
- In office 1947–1954
- President: Harry S. Truman; Dwight D. Eisenhower
- Preceded by: J. Albert Woll
- Succeeded by: Irwin N. Cohen

Personal details
- Born: August 15, 1908 Chicago, Illinois, U.S.
- Died: May 9, 1976 (aged 67) Chicago, Illinois, U.S.
- Resting place: Arlington National Cemetery
- Party: Democratic
- Spouse: Helena Cermak (m. 1934)
- Children: 2
- Relatives: Otto Kerner Sr. (father)
- Education: Brown University (BA); Trinity College, Cambridge; Northwestern University (LLB)

Military service
- Allegiance: United States
- Branch/service: United States Army
- Years of service: 1934–1954
- Rank: Lieutenant Colonel (Army); Major General (National Guard)
- Unit: 33rd Infantry Division; Illinois Army National Guard
- Battles/wars: World War II
- Awards: Bronze Star; Soldier's Medal
- Criminal information
- Criminal information
- Status: Released on parole
- Convictions: Mail fraud; Bribery; Conspiracy; Tax evasion; Perjury; Making false statements
- Penalty: Served nearly 8 months of a 3 year sentence; paroled

Signature
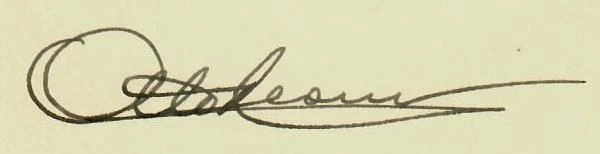

Otto Kerner Jr. (August 15, 1908 – May 9, 1976) was an American jurist and politician. He served as the 33rd governor of Illinois from 1961 to 1968 and chaired the National Advisory Commission on Civil Disorders (the Kerner Commission). He was then appointed a United States circuit judge of the United States Court of Appeals for the Seventh Circuit. He was forced to step down from the bench after being convicted of mail fraud in 1974.

== Early life ==
Kerner was born in Chicago, Illinois, on August 15, 1908, the son of Rosalie [née Chmelíková] (1885–1979) and Otto Kerner Sr. (1884–1952). His father, born in Chicago to Czech immigrants from Ronov nad Doubravou and Hrazánky, served as Illinois Attorney General and a judge of the United States Court of Appeals for the Seventh Circuit. His mother was born in Lišov and came to America with her parents and sisters. Born into the Czech community of Chicago, he was named after his father.

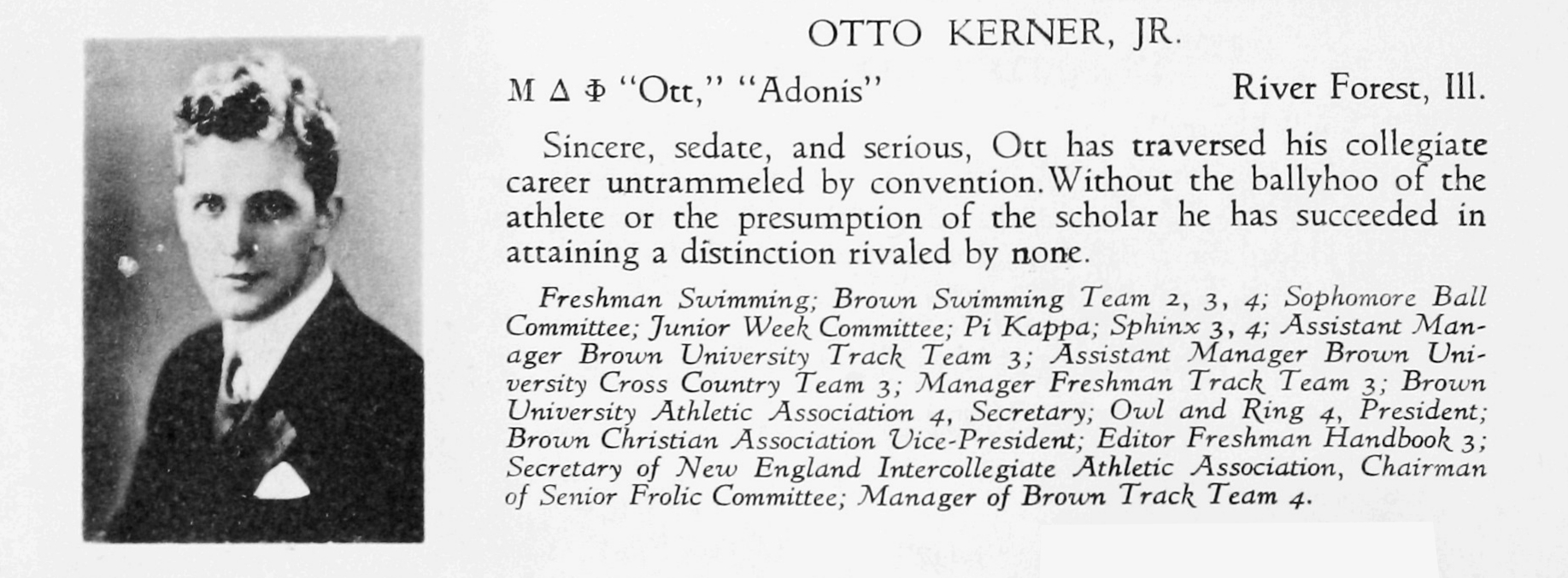
Kerner in the Brown University yearbook, 1930

After graduating with an Artium Baccalaureus degree from Brown University in 1930, Kerner attended Trinity College, Cambridge in England from 1930 to 1931. In 1934, he received a Bachelor of Laws from Northwestern University School of Law in Chicago and was admitted to the Illinois bar. On October 20, 1934, he married Helena Cermak, daughter of the late Anton Cermak, who had been mayor of Chicago before he was shot and mortally wounded in Miami, Florida, in 1933 by Giuseppe Zangara in what may have been an attempt on the life of president-elect Franklin D. Roosevelt.

Kerner joined the 33rd Division of the Illinois National Guard in 1934 and because of his time in the National Guard he was quickly granted a commission when the Second World War broke out. In 1942, he entered active duty in World War II, serving as a field artillery officer in the 9th Infantry Division of the United States Army in North Africa and Italy and in the 32nd Infantry Division in the Pacific. He was awarded the Bronze Star Medal for merit and the Soldier's Medal for rescuing a drowning soldier off the coast of Sicily. He was released from active duty in 1946 as a lieutenant colonel and rejoined the Illinois National Guard. In the 33rd Division, Kerner was promoted to the rank of colonel in the Illinois Army National Guard that same year and to brigadier general in 1951. He retired from the Army National Guard in 1954 as a major general. During his time in the Army, Kerner deeply impressed his commanding officer at the time, Jacob Arvey, who was also the leader of the Cook County Democratic party. This friendship proved beneficial to Kerner as it garnered him much support from local politicians, notably Richard J. Daley, who supported Kerner as a Democratic nominee.

== Political career ==
In 1947, Kerner was appointed United States Attorney for the Northern District of Illinois, a post which he held until 1954. He then became a judge in the Illinois Circuit Court of Cook County from 1954 to 1961. In both of those posts, Kerner was an advocate for reforming adoption laws and procedures. He also prosecuted famed automobile executive Preston Tucker for fraud, but Tucker was acquitted.

He defeated incumbent William G. Stratton by more than 500,000 votes in the 1960 Illinois gubernatorial election and was re-elected in 1964, defeating moderate Republican Charles H. Percy. As governor, Kerner promoted economic development, education, mental health services, and equal access to jobs and housing. Some of his major economic developments were when he won the contract to build the Fermi National Accelerator Laboratory. In 1965 Kerner submitted an article called "Illinois Opens the Export Doors" in which he explained his goal to initiate the full employment granted by export trade citing a potential 250,000 workers that could be put to work. The primary goal was job creation, which to him was achieved through the improvement of trade. As a result, Kerner funded an Illinois Committee for Trade Expansion. His first mission to Europe in 1963 saw an additional $5 million generated for Illinoisan agriculturists. At that time Japan was the state's largest trading partner, with $145 million of annual trade. Kerner saw Japan as a valuable asset and thus funded the Illinois Far Eastern Movement which included many corporate delegates. Relations with Japan remained good; the Japanese Prime Minister Eisaku Sato, who had been previously invited by Kerner in 1965, gave an impressive speech in 1967 praising the State of Illinois for its continued trade with Japan.

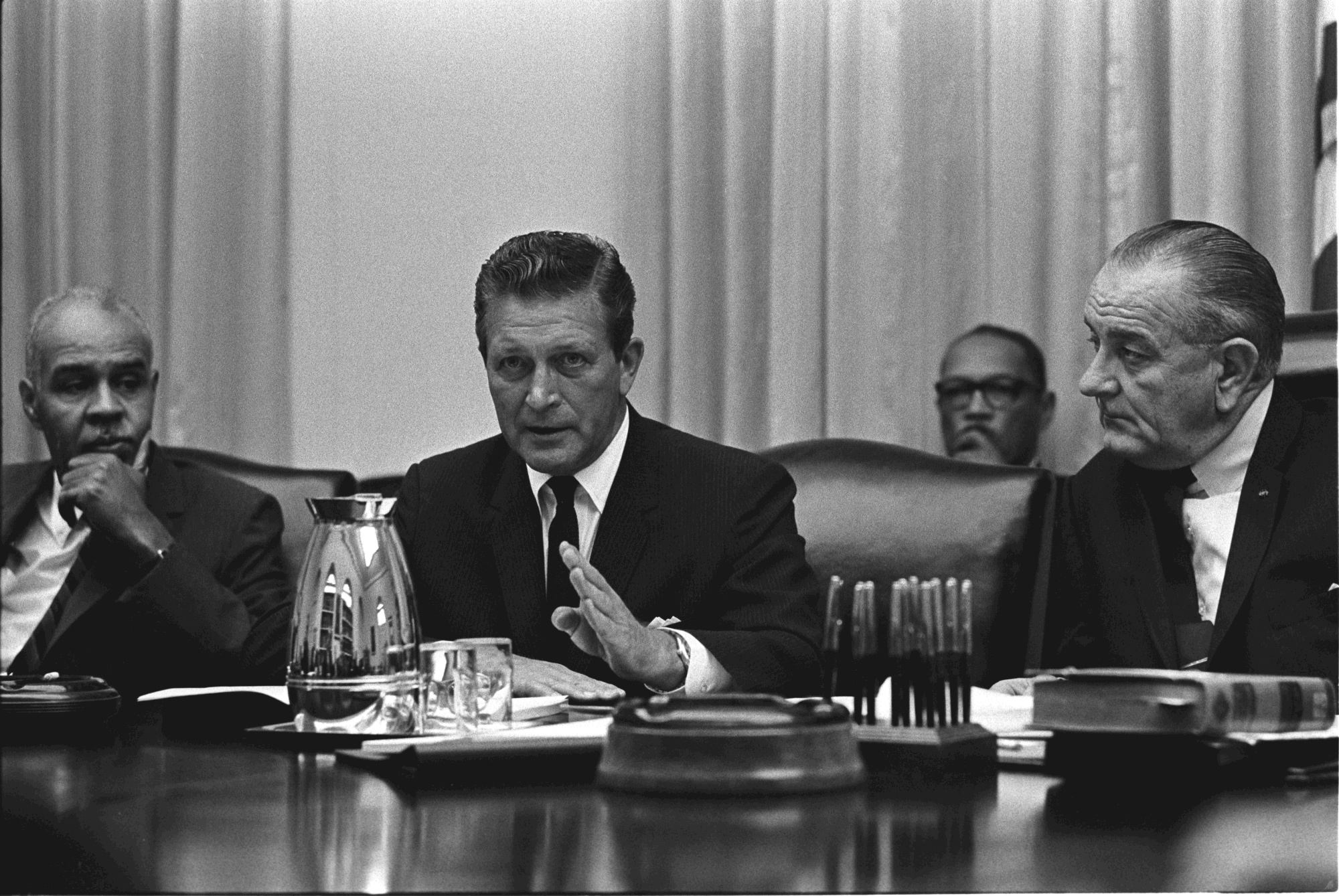
Kerner (center) meeting with Roy Wilkins (left) and President Lyndon B. Johnson (right) at the White House in 1967.

Kerner also proved competent in terms of welfare arrangements. Later on, his advances in mental health programs were so successful that they became a model for the coming national health reform. He served on the National Governors' Conference Executive Committee from 1967 to 1968, and chaired the Midwestern Governors' Conference that same year. In July 1967, President Lyndon B. Johnson formed the National Advisory Commission on Civil Disorders and named Kerner its chairman. As chairman of the National Advisory Commission on Civil Disorders, Kerner sent a number of letters to Lyndon Johnson urging him to increase the number of black officers in the United States Army, which was drastically low (Army 1.15%, Air Force 0.6%). He also sent a number of letters to Attorney General Ramsey Clark and Rosel H Hyde, Chairman of the Federal Communications Commission, pressing them for more effective radio equipment for the police force as well as improved riot training. The letters stressed the need to not overlook the major points of the commission's findings but to use the lessons learned in the riots to further promote law and order across the nation. Kerner did not run for a third term and resigned as governor on May 20, 1968, to accept a federal judicial appointment.

== Federal judicial service ==
Kerner was nominated by President Lyndon B. Johnson on March 11, 1968, to a seat on the United States Court of Appeals for the Seventh Circuit vacated by Judge Winfred George Knoch. He was confirmed by the United States Senate on April 11, 1968, and received his commission on April 22, 1968. His service terminated on July 22, 1974, due to his resignation.

== Scandal and conviction ==
In 1969, Marje Lindheimer Everett, manager of Arlington Park and Washington Park race tracks, engaged by federal prosecutors as an unindicted co-conspirator, was accused of bribing then-Governor Kerner and his Finance Director, Ted Isaacs, to gain choice racing dates for her Arlington Park racetrack. The alleged bribes were in the form of stock options in 1961 that Kerner bought at a reduced price and then sold in 1968 at a profit. The events came to light because Everett had deducted the value of the stock on her federal income tax returns in the belief that the stock option was an ordinary business expense in Illinois. Everett denied at trial that she intended to bribe Kerner, and the government never identified her as a briber.

Even though Kerner reported the profits in his tax returns he was charged with bribery and retained Paul Connolly and Thomas Patton of Williams & Connolly to represent him. Following a 1973 trial in which his prosecutors were future Illinois Republican governor James R. Thompson and future White House Chief of Staff, Republican Samuel K. Skinner, Kerner was convicted on 17 counts of mail fraud, conspiracy, perjury, and related charges. On appeal 13 counts were overturned. Four counts of mail fraud were upheld. He was sentenced to three years in federal prison in Chicago and fined $50,000. Faced with almost certain impeachment, he resigned his position on the federal bench on July 22, 1974.

Kerner began his sentence at a minimum security Federal prison hospital in Lexington, Kentucky. He was released early from prison when it was determined that he was suffering from terminal cancer.

== Death ==
Kerner died in Chicago on May 9, 1976. Due to his military service, he was interred at Arlington National Cemetery, Arlington County, Virginia.

== Awards ==
Otto Kerner was inducted as a Laureate of The Lincoln Academy of Illinois and awarded the Order of Lincoln (the State's highest honor) by the Governor of Illinois in 1977 in the area of Government.

== Sources ==
Legal offices
Preceded by Albert Woll	United States Attorney for the Northern District of Illinois; 1947–1954	Succeeded by Irwin Cohen
Preceded by Winfred George Knoch	Judge of the United States Court of Appeals for the Seventh Circuit; 1968–1974	Succeeded by William J. Bauer
Party political offices
Preceded by Richard B. Austin	Democratic nominee for Governor of Illinois; 1960, 1964	Succeeded by Samuel H. Shapiro
Political offices
Preceded by William Stratton	Governor of Illinois; 1961–1968	Succeeded by Samuel H. Shapiro
