= Robert Gettleman =

American judge (born 1943)

Robert William Gettleman
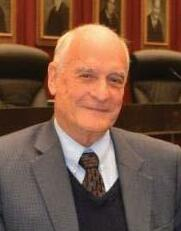
- Gettleman in 2019

Senior Judge of the United States District Court for the Northern District of Illinois
- Incumbent
- Assumed office May 5, 2009

Judge of the United States District Court for the Northern District of Illinois
- In office October 11, 1994 – May 5, 2009
- Appointed by: Bill Clinton
- Preceded by: John F. Grady
- Succeeded by: Gary Feinerman

Personal details
- Born: Robert William Gettleman; 1943 (age 82–83) Atlantic City, New Jersey, U.S.
- Education: Boston University (BS, BA); Northwestern University (JD)

Robert William Gettleman (born 1943) is a senior United States district judge of the United States District Court for the Northern District of Illinois.

== Early life and education ==
Gettleman was born in Atlantic City, New Jersey and moved with his family to Miami, Florida at a young age. Gettleman received joint Bachelor of Science and Bachelor of Arts degrees from Boston University in 1965. He received a Juris Doctor from Northwestern University School of Law in 1968. He was a staff law clerk for the United States Court of Appeals for the Seventh Circuit in 1968. He was a law clerk for Judge Latham Castle of the United States Court of Appeals for the Seventh Circuit from 1968 to 1969. He was a law clerk for Judge Luther Merritt Swygert of the United States Court of Appeals for the Seventh Circuit in 1970.

== Career ==
Gettleman was in private practice of law in Chicago from 1970 to 1994. He joined the firm of D'Ancona & Pflaum as an associate in the firm's litigation department in 1970, and became a partner in 1974. He remained with the firm until being appointed to the federal bench.

=== Federal judicial service ===
Gettleman was nominated by President Bill Clinton on August 16, 1994, to serve as a United States district judge of the United States District Court for the Northern District of Illinois to a seat vacated by John Francis Grady. He was confirmed by the United States Senate on October 7, 1994, and received his commission on October 11, 1994. Gettleman assumed senior status on May 5, 2009.

== See also ==
- List of Jewish American jurists

Legal offices
Preceded by John F. Grady	Judge of the United States District Court for the Northern District of Illinois; 1994–2009	Succeeded by Gary Feinerman
