= Superior Court of Cook County =

Former court with jurisdiction over Cook County, Illinois

The Superior Court of Cook County was a court in Cook County, Illinois, which existed (under different names) from 1845 up until Cook County's courts were merged in 1964 to form the current incarnation of the Circuit Court of Cook County.

The court held circuit jurisdiction.

== History ==
The court that was later known as the "Superior Court of Cook County" was initially created in 1845 as the County Court of Cook County, as a court of circuit jurisdiction. In this initial incarnation, it was presided over by a judge appointed by the Illinois Legislature. In 1849, the court was renamed the "Cook County Court of Common Pleas", and its judgeship became a publicly elected office. In 1859, it was reformed and was renamed the "Superior Court of Chicago", and its bench was expanded to three judges that were elected for six-year terms. Judicial terms were staggered so that elections to a judgeship could be held once every two years.

In 1870, the court was reformed again and renamed the "Superior Court of Cook County", being incorporated under the newly ratified 1870 Constitution of Illinois as a part of the circuit court system of the state. The 1870 state constitution also made judges of both the Superior and Circuit courts of Cook County, ex-officio judges of the Cook County Criminal Court. The 1870 state constitution also allowed for both the Superior Court of Cook County and the Circuit Court of Cook County to expand their bench with additional judgeships. A law passed on April 1, 1875, accordingly expanded the court's bench, with four additional judgeships being created by virtue of the law. The law provided that for every increment of 50,000 county inhabitants above 400,000, a judgeship should be created until such a time that the court reached a maximum of nine judgeships. The first four new judgeships created by this were filled in elections held in November 1880. The court ultimately reached nine judgeships. In 1893, a state law was adopted allowing the court to expand from nine judges to twelve. Another law was passed in 1901 allowing it to expand from twelve to fifteen judgeships, though this latter law was ultimately struck down as unconstitutional by the Illinois Supreme Court.

In its various incarnations, the court held roughly the same jurisdiction as the original Circuit Court of Cook County.

The court ceased to exist in 1964 after an amendment to the Constitution of Illinois took effect and created of the modern Circuit Court of Cook County, under which Cook County's court system was unified.

== Judges ==
=== Cook County Superior Court (1845–1849) judge ===
Hugh T. Dickey served as the only judge of this incarnation of the court, being appointed in February 1845 and resigning in 1848.

=== Cook County Court of Common Pleas (1849–1859) judges ===
- Giles Spring (elected in April 1849, died on the bench May 15, 1851)
- Mark Skinner (1851–1853)
- John M. Wilson (1853–1859)

=== Superior Court of Chicago (1859–1870) and Superior Court of Cook County (1870–1864) judges ===
- Grant Goodrich (1859–1863)
- John M. Wilson (1859–1867)
- Van Hollis Higgins (elected in April 1859–resigned in July 1865)
- Joseph Gary (1867–1906; was chief justice for a portion of tenure; died on bench)
- John A. Jameson (1865–Dec. 1883)
- William A. Porter (1867–Dec. 1873)
- Elliott Anthony (served Dec. 1880– Dec.1886)
- Kirk Hawes (Dec. 1880–Dec. 1886)
- Samuel M. Moore (served Dec. 1873– Dec. 1879)
- Sidney Smith (served Dec. 1879–Dec. 1885)
- George Gardner (served Dec. 1880–Dec. 1886)
- Rollin S. Williamson (served Dec. 1880– Dec. 1886)
- Henry M. Shepard (served Dec. 1883–Dec. 1889)
- Gwynn Garnett (served Dec. 1885–Dec. 1891)
- John Peter Altgeld (served 1886–1891)
- Theodore Brentano (served 1890–1922; was chief justice for a portion of tenure)
- Nathaniel C. Sears (1893–1897)
- John Barton Payne (served 1893–1898)
- Jesse Holdom (served 1898–___?)
- Jonas Hutchinson (served 1891–1903)
- William H. McSurely (1907–1922; served chief justice for latter portion of tenure)
- William Emmett Dever (served 1910–1916)
- Frederic R. DeYoung (served in 1921)
- Walter Steffen (served 1922–1937)
- Roger Kiley (served in 1940)
- Edgar A. Jonas (served 1940–1941)
- Edwin Albert Robson (served 1945–1951; served as chief justice 1949–1951)
- Richard B. Austin (served 1953–1960)
- Abraham Lincoln Marovitz (served 1950–1963)
- Alexander J. Napoli (served 1960–1963)
- James Benton Parsons (served 1960–1961)
- Robert L. Hunter (served 1962–1964)

== Other notable individuals ==
- Hugo Friend (served as a master in chancery 1916–1920)
- Martin Gorski (served as a master in chancery 1929–1942)
- William W. Link (served as chief clerk 1942–1943)
- Francis S. Lorenz (served as chief clerk 1956–1958)
- Benjamin Drake Magruder (served as maste in chancery 1868–1885)
- James Robert Mann (served as a master in chancery)
- Philip Leo Sullivan (served as a master in chancery 1916–1917)
- Hempstead Washburne (served as a mastery in chancery)

== See also ==
- Pullman Palace Car Co. v. Speck
- Administrative hearing of William McAndrew, voided in a lawsuit decided by the Superior Court
- Jennie Barmore, notable plaintiff in lawsuit heard before the court
