= Joseph Gary =

19th century American judge

Joseph E. Gary
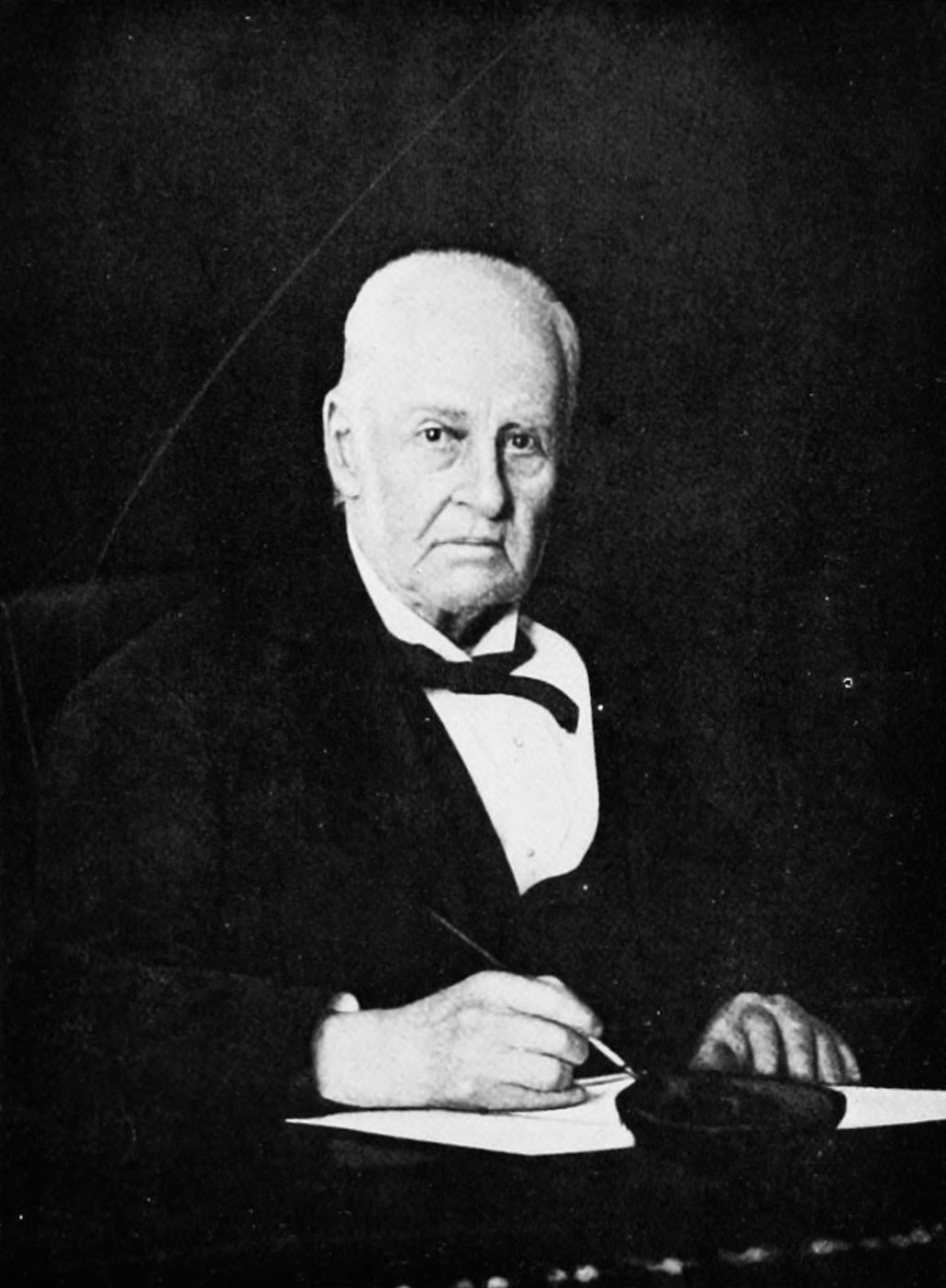

Judge of the Illinois Appellate Court for the 1st district
- In office November 12, 1888 – June 1897
- Preceded by: William K. McAllister
- Succeeded by: Francis Adams

Judge of the Superior Court of Cook County
- In office November 1863 – October 31, 1906 (died)
- Preceded by: John M. Wilson
- Succeeded by: William H. McSurely

Personal details
- Born: July 9, 1821 Potsdam, New York, U.S.
- Died: October 31, 1906 (aged 85) Chicago, Illinois, U.S.
- Resting place: Oakwood Cemetery, Berlin, Wisconsin
- Party: Republican
- Spouse: Elizabeth Jane Swetting (m. 1855–1906)
- Children: Mary Swetting Gary^{(b. 1856; died 1858)}; Frances Louise Gary^{(b. 1858; died 1868)}; Fannie Cary (Patrick)^{(b. 1861; died 1922)}; Charlotte Blanche (Barnum)^{(b. 1863; died 1945)}
- Relatives: George Gary (brother)
- Profession: Lawyer

Joseph Easton Gary (July 9, 1821 – October 31, 1906) was an American lawyer and judge in the state of Illinois. He served over 40 years as a judge of the Superior Court of Cook County, including eight years as judge of the Illinois Appellate Court for the Cook County district. He presided over the trial of eight anarchists for their alleged role in the Haymarket Riot, and sentenced seven of them to death despite a lack of a clear connection to the bomber.

== Early life ==
Joseph Gary was born in Potsdam, New York. As a young man he worked as a carpenter, following the trade of his father. He then moved to St. Louis in 1843 to study law and was admitted to the bar in 1844. He practised for five years in Springfield, Missouri, then moved to Las Vegas, New Mexico, in 1849 and established a practice there. After three years, he moved to San Francisco, California, and then to Berlin, Wisconsin. He finally settled in Chicago in 1856, and remained there for the rest of his life.

== Judicial service ==
In 1863, Gary was elected as a judge of the Superior Court of Chicago (which was in 1870 renamed the "Superior Court of Cook County"). He ceased practising law after becoming a judge. Gary was re-elected in 1881, 1887, 1893, 1900, and 1905.

As a judge on this court, Gary presided over the Haymarket Riot case in 1886, sentencing anarchists August Spies, Michael Schwab, Samuel Fielden, Albert Parsons, Adolph Fischer, George Engel, and Louis Lingg to death, and sentencing Oscar Neebe to 15 years. There was no evidence that any of the defendants had any connection with the bombing. Gary allowed them to be convicted on the theory that their speeches had encouraged the unknown bomber to commit the act. During the trial, anarchist sympathizers frequently made death threats against him, raising his general popularity.

In 1888, Gary was appointed as one of the three judges of the Illinois Appellate Court in the first district—Cook County—by the members of the Illinois Supreme Court. He served eight years assigned to the Appellate Court before being dismissed by the Illinois Supreme Court in June 1897, along with nearly every other appellate judge in the state.

Gary had continued to hold his judgeship on the Cook County Superior Court while serving on the appellate court. After his dismissal from the appellate court, Gary continued serving on the county superior court. Later that year, he presided over the sensational murder trial of Adolph Luetgert.

Gary was still active as a judge at the time of his death, and was the oldest judge on his court and one of the oldest judges in the country at the time. He held court on the morning before his death. He became ill the morning of his death, and soon died at home just after noon. In April 1907, a special election was held to fill the remaining four years of his term. Republican William H. McSurely narrowly defeated Democrat William Emmett Dever.

== Personal life ==
Gary was the eldest of five children born to Eli Bush Gary and Frances O. Gary (née Easton). Eli Gary was a carpenter and joiner who served as a volunteer in the War of 1812. Joseph's younger brother, George Gary, was a politician and judge in Wisconsin.

In 1855, Gary married Elizabeth Jane Swelting, at Berlin, Wisconsin.

== Bibliography ==
- "Judge Gary Dead.", The New York Times, November 1, 1906.

Legal offices
Preceded by Grant Goodrich	Judge of the Superior Court of Cook County; November 1863 – October 31, 1906	Succeeded by William H. McSurely
Preceded by William K. McAllister	Judge of the Illinois Appellate Court for the 1st district November 12, 1888 – June 1897	Succeeded by Francis Adams
