= William H. McSurely =

American politician

William Harvey McSurely (January 27, 1865 – May 27, 1943) was an American judge, lawyer, and politician.

McSurely was born in Oxford, Ohio. He lived with his parents and family in Hillsboro, Ohio. McSurely received his bachelor's degree from the College of Wooster in 1886. He moved to Chicago, Illinois in 1887 and was admitted to the Illinois bar in 1889. McSurely practiced law and lived with his wife and family in Chicago. He served in the Illinois House of Representatives in 1905 and 1906 and was a Republican.

Surely was elected a judge on the Superior Court of Cook County in 1907, defeating William Emmett Dever in 1907 to fill the unexpired term of Joseph Gary. In 1922, while serving as the chief justice of the Superior Court of Cook County, he was assigned by the Supreme Court of Illinois to serve on the Illinois Appellate Court. He held this position until his death. He died from a heart problem in a hospital in Chicago, Illinois.
