= William K. McAllister =

American judge

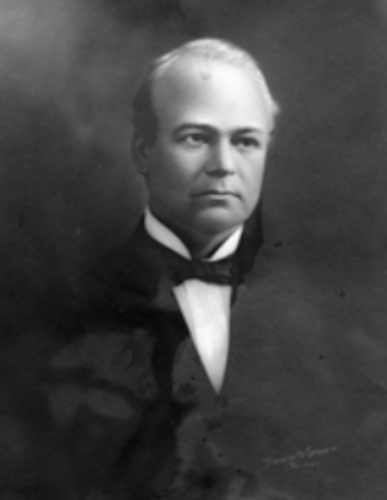
McAllister's portrait at the Illinois Supreme Court.

William King McAllister (August 5, 1818 – October 29, 1888) was an American jurist.

Born in Salem, Washington County, New York, McAllister was admitted to the New York bar. In 1858, McAllister moved to Chicago, Illinois, and practiced law. He served as Recorder's Court judge. From 1870 to 1875, McAllister served on the Supreme Court of Illinois. In 1875, McAlllister resigned from the Supreme Court to serve as an Illinois circuit court judge. He also served on the Illinois Appellate Court. McAllister died suddenly at his house in Ravenswood, Chicago, of heart failure.
