= Edwin Albert Robson =

American judge

Senior Judge of the United States District Court for the Northern District of Illinois
- In office April 16, 1975 – October 21, 1986

Chief Judge of the United States District Court for the Northern District of Illinois
- In office 1970–1975
- Preceded by: William Joseph Campbell
- Succeeded by: James Benton Parsons

Judge of the United States District Court for the Northern District of Illinois
- In office September 29, 1958 – April 16, 1975
- Appointed by: Dwight D. Eisenhower
- Preceded by: Winfred George Knoch
- Succeeded by: John F. Grady

Judge of the Illinois Appellate Court
- In office 1951–1958

Chief Justice of the Superior Court of Cook County
- In office 1949–1951

Justice of the Superior Court of Cook County
- In office 1945–1951

Personal details
- Born: Edwin Albert Robson; April 16, 1905 Chicago, Illinois, U.S.
- Died: October 21, 1986 (aged 81)
- Education: DePaul University College of Law (LL.B.)

Edwin Albert Robson (April 16, 1905 – October 21, 1986) was a United States district judge of the United States District Court for the Northern District of Illinois.

== Education and career ==
Born in Chicago, Illinois, Robson received a Bachelor of Laws from the DePaul University College of Law in 1928 and entered private practice in Chicago. He became a Judge of the Superior Court of Cook County in 1945. In 1949 he became Chief Justice of that court. He became a Judge of the Illinois Appellate Court in 1951, a role he served in until his appointment to the federal bench.

== Federal judicial service ==
Robson received a recess appointment from President Dwight D. Eisenhower on September 29, 1958, to a seat vacated by Judge Winfred George Knoch on the United States District Court for the Northern District of Illinois. He was formally nominated to the same seat by President Eisenhower on January 17, 1959, confirmed on April 29, 1959, and received his commission on April 30, 1959. He was a member of the Judicial Conference of the United States from 1966 to 1969, and a member of the Judicial Panel on Multidistrict Litigation from 1968 to 1979. He served as Chief Judge from 1970 to 1975, and assumed senior status on April 16, 1975. Robson served in that capacity until his death on October 21, 1986.

== Sources ==
Legal offices
| Preceded by Winfred George Knoch | Judge of the United States District Court for the Northern District of Illinois; 1958–1975 | Succeeded by John F. Grady |
| Preceded by William Joseph Campbell | Chief Judge of the United States District Court for the Northern District of Illinois; 1970–1975 | Succeeded by James Benton Parsons |
