= A. L. Cronin =

American lawyer and politician

Aloysius L. Cronin June 30, 1902–September 23, 1974) was an American lawyer and politician.

Cronin was born in Chicago, Illinois. He went to the Chicago public and private schools. He received his law degree from Loyola University Chicago School of Law in 1927 and was admitted to the Illinois bar. He practiced law in Chicago. Cronin served in the Illinois House of Representatives from 1949 to 1953 and in the Illinois Senate from 1955 until 1967. He was a Democrat. Cronin served on the Chicago Liquor License Appeals Commission from 1943 until 1973 and was the chair of the commission. Cronin died at his home in Chicago after suffering from a three-month illness.
