= Virginia Mary Kendall =

American judge (born 1962)

Virginia Kendall
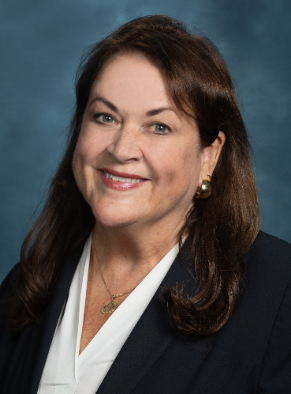

Chief Judge of the United States District Court for the Northern District of Illinois
- Incumbent
- Assumed office August 1, 2024
- Preceded by: Rebecca R. Pallmeyer

Judge of the United States District Court for the Northern District of Illinois
- Incumbent
- Assumed office January 3, 2006
- Appointed by: George W. Bush
- Preceded by: Suzanne B. Conlon

Personal details
- Born: January 25, 1962 (age 64) Evanston, Illinois, U.S.
- Education: Northwestern University (BA, MA); Loyola University Chicago (JD)

Virginia Mary Kendall (born January 25, 1962) is an American attorney and jurist serving as the chief United States district judge of the United States District Court for the Northern District of Illinois. President George W. Bush appointed her to the bench on January 3, 2006. In addition to serving on the bench, Judge Kendall is also a noted expert on child exploitation and human trafficking, as well as an adjunct professor and author.

== Early life and education ==
Born in Evanston, Illinois, Kendall graduated from Northwestern University with her Bachelor of Arts degree in 1984. She received a Master of Arts degree in writing from Northwestern in 1987 and her Juris Doctor from Loyola University Chicago School of Law in 1992 where she attended night school while raising her three preschool-aged children.

== Career ==
Following law school graduation, she worked as a law clerk for Judge George M. Marovich of the United States District Court for the Northern District of Illinois from 1992 to 1995.

=== U.S. Department of Justice ===
Prior to joining the bench, Kendall worked for the United States Attorney's Office in Chicago and tried numerous federal jury trials involving white collar crime, insurance fraud, police corruption, public corruption, child molestation, and racketeering. While at the United States Attorney's Office in Chicago, she served as Deputy Chief in the Criminal Division, Child Exploitation Coordinator, and Coordinator of Project Safe Neighborhoods. Kendall helped to create and then served on the Attorney General's Advisory Committee which reviewed all child exploitation cases that impacted multiple jurisdictions.

=== Federal judicial service ===
Kendall was nominated to the United States District Court for the Northern District of Illinois on September 28, 2005, by President George W. Bush. She was confirmed by the United States Senate on December 21, 2005, on a voice vote and received her commission on January 3, 2006. Kendall served for six years on the Judicial Conference's Judicial Codes of Conduct Committee where she was responsible for drafting changes to the Codes of Conduct in a number of areas, most notably on social media. Kendall holds leadership roles in numerous bar organizations including the Federal Bar Association, the International Bar Association, the American Bar Association and the Federal Circuit Bar Association. Her leadership positions have included co-chair of the Human Trafficking Committee, the Jury Innovations Committee, and the Access to Justice Committee with the Litigation Section of the ABA; co-chair of the Human Trafficking Committee with the Criminal Justice Section of the ABA; serving on the presidential task force for both the ABA and the IBA; and serving on the Federal Judiciary Committees of both the Federal Bar Association and the Federal Circuit Bar Association. Kendall also serves on the executive committee of the Federal Judges Association. Kendall is committed to opening her courtroom regularly to students where she encourages young students to strive to practice law through her role on the Judicial Advisory Committee of Just the Beginning Foundation, the Cristo Rey Network, and numerous local schools dedicated to integrating students of color and of other underrepresented groups into the practice of law. Kendall is an active member of Cornell University's Avon Global Center for Women and Justice, as well as the Vital Voices Global Partnership, an organization dedicated to the empowerment of women in impoverished and politically underrepresented environments around the world. She became the chief judge on August 1, 2024, when Judge Pallmeyer assumed senior status.

=== Domestic and international training ===
Kendall travels extensively both domestically and internationally to train judges, trial attorneys and investigators in the areas of trial law, rule of law, ethics, terrorism trials, crimes against women and children, human trafficking and public corruption. Internationally, she has traveled through the State Department, the Department of Justice, Lawyers Without Borders, and various bar associations to Kenya, Zambia, Liberia, Cyprus, India, Croatia, Latvia, Lithuania, Italy, the UK, and Japan to teach judges and trial attorneys. Domestically, she created a human trafficking training module for task forces and for judges and she regularly holds seminars to educate them and the public. She also regularly presents ethics training to the federal judiciary and judicial employees.

=== Teaching and writing ===
Kendall has been an adjunct professor of law for over twenty years and currently teaches law courses in trial practice, federal litigation, and human trafficking at the University of Chicago Law School, Northwestern University School of Law and Loyola University Chicago School of Law. She has authored numerous articles on a variety of topics including international human rights, human trafficking, and transnational investigations. Kendall is the co-author of the treatise, Child Exploitation and Trafficking: Examining the Global Challenges and U.S. Responses. Aside from her own writing, she also serves as an editor of Litigation Magazine and is a member of the American Law Institute where she is currently working as an Advisor to the drafting of a model penal code for sexual offenses. She currently lectures extensively both domestically and internationally in the areas of trial practice, public corruption, ethics, electronic discovery, patent litigation, social media, internet and computer investigations, intellectual property case management, child exploitation, human trafficking and judicial training.

=== Awards and honors ===
For her work as a federal prosecutor, Kendall received the Chicago Crime Commission's Star of Distinction Award in 2005; the Department of Justice's Service Award in 2003; and the FBI Director's Letter of Recognition in 1998.

Kendall has received numerous other awards including both the St. Robert Bellarmine Award and the Damen Award from Loyola University for her distinguished legal work and her service to the community; the Rape Victim Advocate's Visionary Award for her work with victims of sexual violence; the Eleanor Roosevelt Leadership Award for her being a courageous and compassionate role model, the Women and Gender Rights Leadership Award from DePaul University School of Law, and an honorary degree from Dominican University, which she received with her husband for their dual work serving the community. Judge Kendall also received the 2015 Women of Achievement award from the YWCA Lake County for her role in combating human trafficking.

== Sources ==
Legal offices
Preceded by Suzanne B. Conlon	Judge of the United States District Court for the Northern District of Illinois; 2006–present	Incumbent
Preceded by Rebecca R. Pallmeyer	Chief Judge of the United States District Court for the Northern District of Illinois; 2024–present	Incumbent
