= William Emmett Dever =

American mayor (1862–1929)

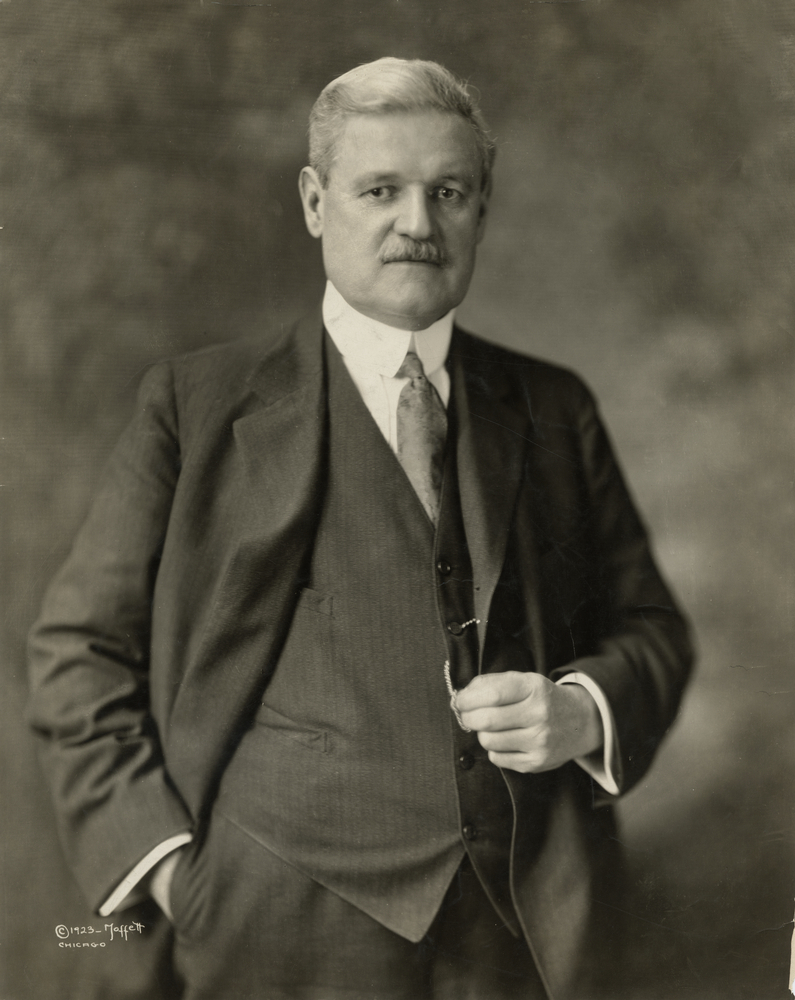
- Dever in 1923

42nd Mayor of Chicago
- In office April 16, 1923 – April 18, 1927
- Preceded by: William Hale Thompson
- Succeeded by: William Hale Thompson

Justice of Illinois' First District Appellate Court
- In office 1916–1923

Justice of the Superior Court of Cook County
- In office December 1910 – April 14, 1923
- Succeeded by: Jesse Holdom

Alderman of the Chicago City Council
- In office April 1902 – December 1910 Serving with (Note: Prior to 1923, each ward in Chicago elected two aldermen for staggered two-year terms) Lewis D. Sitts
- Preceded by: Frank Oberndorf
- Succeeded by: Stanley S. Walkowiak
- Constituency: 17th ward

Personal details
- Born: March 13, 1862 Woburn, Massachusetts, U.S.
- Died: September 3, 1929 (aged 67) Chicago, Illinois, U.S.
- Party: Democratic
- Spouse: Katherine Conway Dever

William Emmett Dever (March 13, 1862 – September 3, 1929) was an American politician. He was the mayor of Chicago from 1923 to 1927. He had previously served as a judge and before that an alderman. As an alderman and judge he would work to become the Democratic candidate for mayor for over two decades.

Born in Massachusetts but moving to Chicago in young adulthood, William Dever became an alderman and prominently supported municipal ownership of mass transit. He was a member of the Dunne wing of the local Democratic party.

As mayor, he focused on reform and infrastructure during his tenure. Later he would turn his attention to the enforcement of Prohibition despite his personal opposition to it. Such enforcement was initially effective, but indifference from government at other levels limited its efficacy and the lower amount of alcohol increased violence among bootleggers, souring Chicagoans' view on it. Losing to William Hale Thompson in 1927 over the issue, he is the last Democratic nominee in a partisan Chicago mayoral election to lose. Never in particularly good health, he retired from politics after the election and would die of pancreatic cancer two years later.

== Early life ==
Dever was born in Woburn, Massachusetts and entered his family's leather tanning business when he was fifteen. He left Woburn in 1882 and moved to Boston, where he was based while he traveled on tannery business for two years. During this time Dever met Katherine E. Conway and they married in 1885. The two would go on to adopt two sons during their marriage. When Kate noticed an ad stating that leather tanners could make good money in Chicago, the couple moved west.

Upon arriving in Chicago in 1887, Dever got a job working at a leather tannery on Goose Island and he also began taking law courses at night at the Chicago College of Law. Upon his graduation in 1890, Dever opened his own law practice.

== Aldermanic career ==
Dever ran for alderman in 1900, but was defeated. He was encouraged by Graham Taylor to run again for alderman, and, in 1902, was elected alderman of the 17th Ward. Dever was elected as a steadfast supporter of municipal ownership of the city's streetcar services amid the Chicago Traction Wars. He would maintain this position throughout his aldermanic tenure, and continue it into his later mayoralty.

Dever was regarded as an "honest" alderman. He had a clean voting record and was frequently endorsed by the Municipal Voters League in his runs for reelection.

Dever became one of the most influential aldermen during the first mayoralty of Carter Harrison IV Dever got heavy buzz as a potential Democratic mayoral candidate in 1905, but did not run. Dever became a key ally of pro-municipal ownership mayor Edward Fitzsimmons Dunne, who was elected in 1905. While affiliated with the Dunne wing of the Democratic Party as an alderman, Dever was on good terms with the Harrison and Sullivan wings.

In 1906, Dever faced an atypically challenging race for reelection. In retaliation for his vote in support of raising saloon license fees, saloons in his ward raised beer prices and told patrons that the new "Dever tax" was to blame. Active campaigning on his part and strong support from Mayor Dunne secured Dever reelection with a comfortable margin.

In 1906, Dever ran in the inaugural election of the Municipal Court of Chicago. To provide for staggered future elections, the race saw separate elections divided by the duration of terms, with separate elections being held for sets of two-year, four-year, and six-year seats. Dever ran in the race for the six-year seats. Low turnout in these judicial races coupled with the spoiler effect of William Randolph Hearst (who was engaged in a brief feud with Dunne Democrats) running his own Independence League slate hurt Democratic chances. Dever received 94,380 votes, the most of any Democratic candidate for the Municipal Court. However, he placed 20,000 votes behind the last Republican in the six-year field. He had received more votes than Ferdinand L. Barnett, a Republican candidate to a two-year seat who had received only around 90,000 votes. This led some to contend that Dever should be seated to a two-year seat in his place, arguing that holding separate elections for the different durations had been unconstitutional. Dever rejected the effort to seat him in place of Barnett, feeling that it was fueled by prejudice against Barnett (an African American), and therefore refused to challenge Barnett's appointment to the court.

In 1907, Dever ran to fill the vacancy on the Superior Court of Cook County left after Judge Joseph E. Gary's death in office. This election was to a partial term of four years. With Dunne's support, he received the Democratic nomination. Dever tied his candidacy to Dunne's re-election effort in the coinciding mayoral election and to the municipal ownership/traction issue. His Republican opponent was William H. McSurely. McSurely refused to take a stance on the traction issue, due to the fact that the court might soon review the Settlement Ordinances. Dever lost by a margin of roughly 13,000 of the nearly 340,000 votes cast, a result mirroring that of the coinciding mayoral race.

In the spring of 1908, Dever ran a spirited race against seven candidates in the Democratic primary for Cook County state's attorney. He was supported by the Dunne wing of the party. Dever's key opponents were Sullivan wing candidate J.J. Kern (former State's Attorney) and Harrison wing candidate Maclay Hoyne. Kern won the primary with 28% of the vote, defeating Dever (who came second) by several thousand votes.

During Dever's 1910 aldermanic reelection campaign, Stanley H. Kunz, political boss of the neighboring Sixteenth Ward and Chicago's most prominent Polish American politician, slated prominent Polish American lawyer Stanley Walkowiak to primary Dever in an effort to expand Polish American political influence in the city. Dever narrowly won this primary. After this, Kunz initially attempted to get the Republicans to replace their nominee, C.J. Ryberg, with a Polish American colleague of his, before instead deciding to have Walkowiak run as an independent. Dever was backed by Carter Harrison IV, Edward F. Dunne, J. Hamilton Lewis, John Traeger, Joseph Le Buy (president of the Polish Businessmen's Democratic Club), the Chicago Commons caucus, and the Municipal Voters League. Dever won with 2,692 votes (44%) to Walkowiak's 1,886 (31%) and Ryberg's 1,483 (25%).

== Judicial career ==
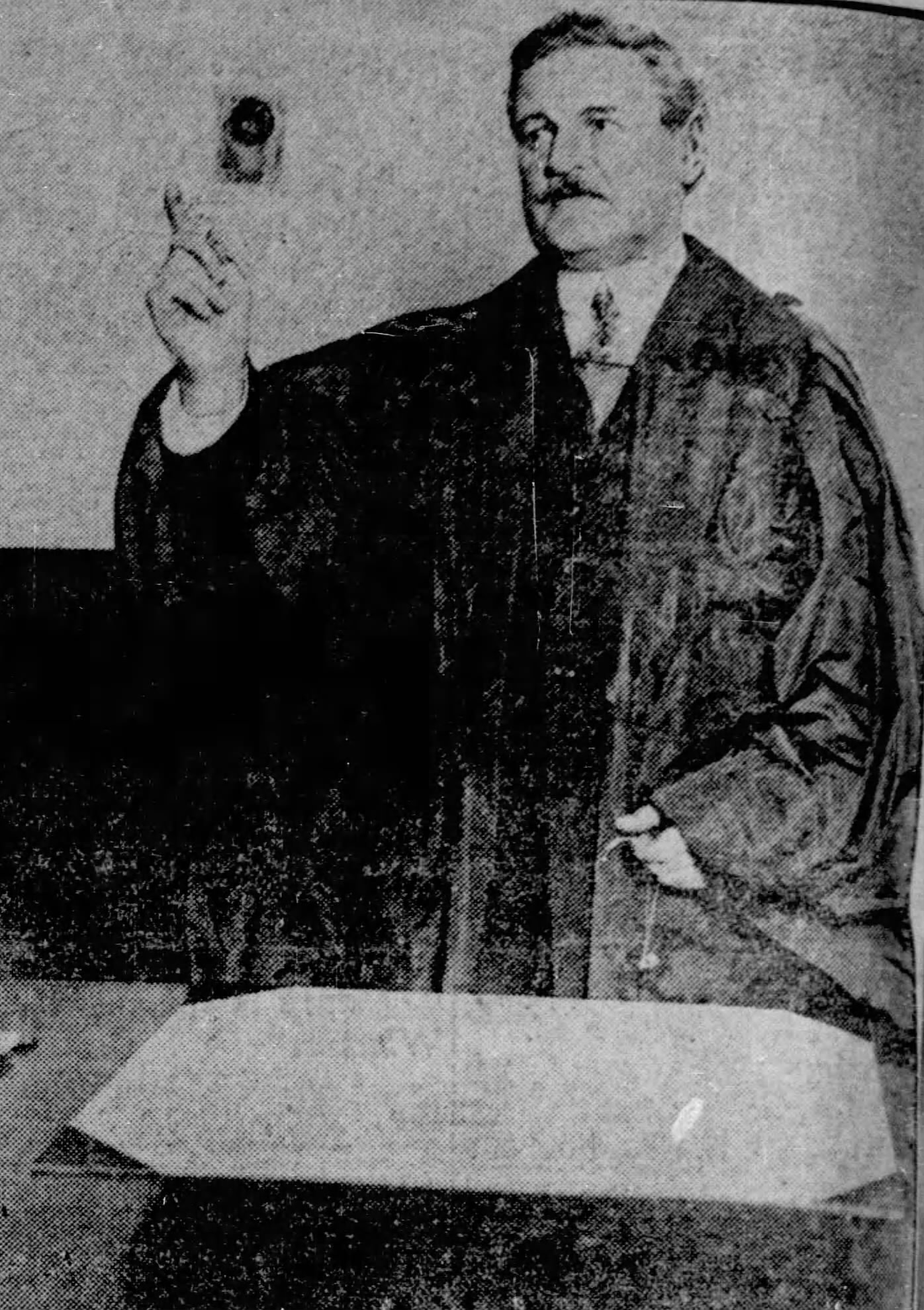
Photograph of Dever as a judge

Dever had been considering running for mayor in the then-upcoming 1911 Chicago mayoral election before being slated by Roger Charles Sullivan on the Democratic ticket for Superior Court of Cook County in the 1910 elections. It took some persuading for Sullivan to convince Dever to run for judge. Dever was elected, resigning from City Council to assume his judgeship.

Dever declined calls to run for mayor in 1915.

In 1916, due to the duration of a trial of William Lorimer for misappropriation of funds and conspiracy to defraud, which lasted two months before reaching acquittal, Dever had only three weeks to run a reelection campaign. Nevertheless, he won handily. Dever was re-elected receiving more than 98,000 votes.

Several months into his third term on the Cook County Superior Court, Dever was appointed to fill a vacancy on the Appellate Court. and served two partial terms on the Appellate Court, eventually becoming its presiding judge. Despite serving on the Appellate Court, Dever officially remained a judge of the Cook County Superior Court, and was re-elected in 1922. After being elected mayor, he resigned from the Cook County Superior Court on April 14, 1923 and also resigned from the Appellate Court. Jesse Holdom won a special election to finish Dever's unexpired term on the Cook County Superior Court.

Dever was assigned the initial case against those involved in the Black Sox Scandal. The arraignment began in February 1921. In March 1921, Dever rejected the prosecution's motion to indefinitely postpone proceedings and set a prompt peremptory trial date. This resulted in Robert E. Crowe, the Cook County state's attorney, opting to instead administratively dismiss the charges (nolle prosequi) and opted instead to present the case to a grand jury again for new indictments, to buy more time to put together a case and gather evidence. The new trial instead landed before judge Hugo Friend.

== Mayoralty ==
=== 1923 mayoral election ===
In 1923, Democratic party boss George E. Brennan selected Dever as having the best chance of defeating the incumbent, Mayor William "Big Bill" Thompson. Dever ran on a reform platform and Thompson withdrew from the race, with Republicans instead nominating Arthur C. Lueder, who was easily defeated by Dever.

=== Mayoral term ===
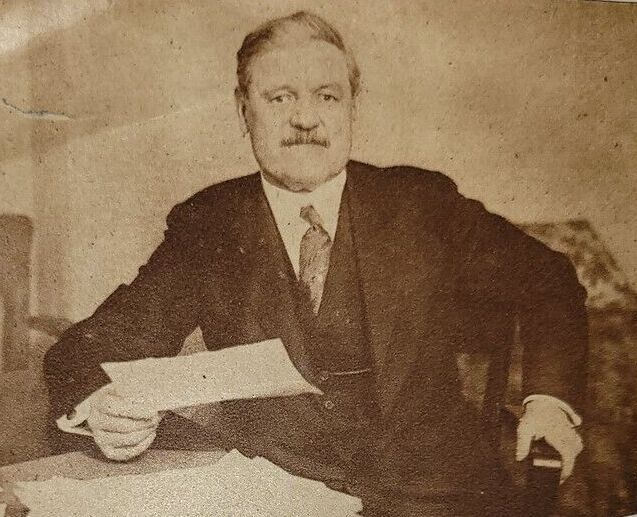
Dever circa 1924

Dever was sworn in on April 16, 1923.

==== Transit ====
Early into his mayoralty, Dever had begun making plans to improve the city's public transit, which he had previously made a central issue in his mayoral election campaign. A longtime advocate for municipal ownership (an issue which had been a hot-button topic in Chicago, particularly during the Chicago Traction Wars), Dever initiated negotiations to purchase Chicago Surface Lines and the Chicago Rapid Transit Company, making them city owned-and-operated services. Dever began also formulating plans for transit expansions and the construction of a subway.

==== Prohibition and crime ====
In the autumn of 1923, the focus of Dever's administration shifted. On September 7, 1923, a shootout occurred took place at a South Side cafe between two rival groups of rum runners, killing one man. A week later the same two groups had another shootout, killing two people. He saw these shootings as an alarm that the city's bootlegging situation had become an epidemic.

Dever himself opposed Prohibition; he was a "wet" Democrat. However, he observed that bootleggers had been making under-the-table payments to public officials and law enforcement, thereby corrupting the government. Also, while he disagreed with the policy of Prohibition, it was his personal philosophy that disregard for one law could foster an erosion in the regard of other laws. Because of his resolution to uphold the law, Dever became nicknamed "Decent Dever" by the press.

Dever launched a major law-enforcement campaign to crack-down on bootlegging. The media labeled his war on bootleggers as the "Great Beer War". By the end of the year, within only one hundred days of the inauguration of this effort, Chicago was being hailed as the "driest" city in the nation.

Dever's "Great Beer War" had earned him immense national recognition. Some national media sources speculated he might be a potential dark horse candidate for president of the United States. At the 1924 Democratic National Convention he received serious discussion as a potential vice-presidential nominee. By the end of 1924, media sources discussed him as a serious contender for the Democratic nomination for president in 1928.

As Chicago began to dry up, gangs of bootleggers had come into greater competition with one another. By early 1925, this led to the eruption of a massive gangland war. While the vast majority of Chicagoans opposed Prohibition, they had initially supported his tactics to enforce the law. However, subsequent to the onslaught of severe gang violence, the public quickly soured on it. His tactics had also only been partially successful. While he had succeeded in organizing a city government which was largely committed to enforcing the law, other governments and their agencies, such as the county government, were still permissive towards bootlegging. Additionally, certain ward politicians and police captains were still making under-the-table deals with gangs.

While Chicago acquired a reputation as a "crime capital", a survey by Andrew A. Bruce (whose findings were unveiled in January 1927), contrarily, found that Chicago had no more crime than twenty other American cities the study looked at (including Kansas City, Los Angeles, Memphis, and St. Louis).

==== Infrastructure ====
Dever's term in office saw many improvements to the city's infrastructure, including the completion of Wacker Drive, the extension of Ogden Avenue, the straightening of the Chicago River and the construction of the city's first airport, Municipal Airport.

==== Schools ====
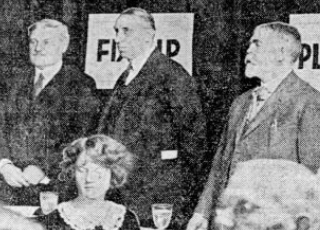
From left to right: Dever, Raymond P. Ensign (chairman of the Chicago Association of Commerce committee), and Superintendent William McAndrew at an event in March 1924

As mayor, Dever generally kept the Chicago Board of Education independent from political interference. This was in contrast to Dever's predecessor, William Hale Thompson, under whose previous mayoralty the schools had been tarnished by politics and fraud.

Early into his mayoralty, Dever appointed seven new members to the Chicago Board of Education. The Dever-shaped school board sought to find a superintendent that would strengthen the educational authority of the office, cut fiscal waste, and improve educational standards. On January 9, 1924, the board voted to appoint William McAndrew as the superintendent of Chicago Public Schools.

On December 5, 1926, in a surprise move, Mayor Dever broke his neutrality amid a school board dispute, he sided with Alderman Leo M. Brieske's position that it would be preferable to see McAndrew replaced with a new superintendent. Dever declared that he believed the superintendent should instead be a native Chicagoan, declaring, "I am heartily in accord with Alderman Brieske's stand that Chicagoans should fill Chicago offices. We have plenty of capable persons at home, without bringing in outsiders". McAndrew remained superintendent, however.

On March 28, 1927, The New York Times wrote that,

No work of Mayor Dever's Administration has been more praiseworthy than the improvement and extension of the public school system, the seat of enormous mismanagement and inefficiency under Thompsonism."

=== 1927 mayoral election ===
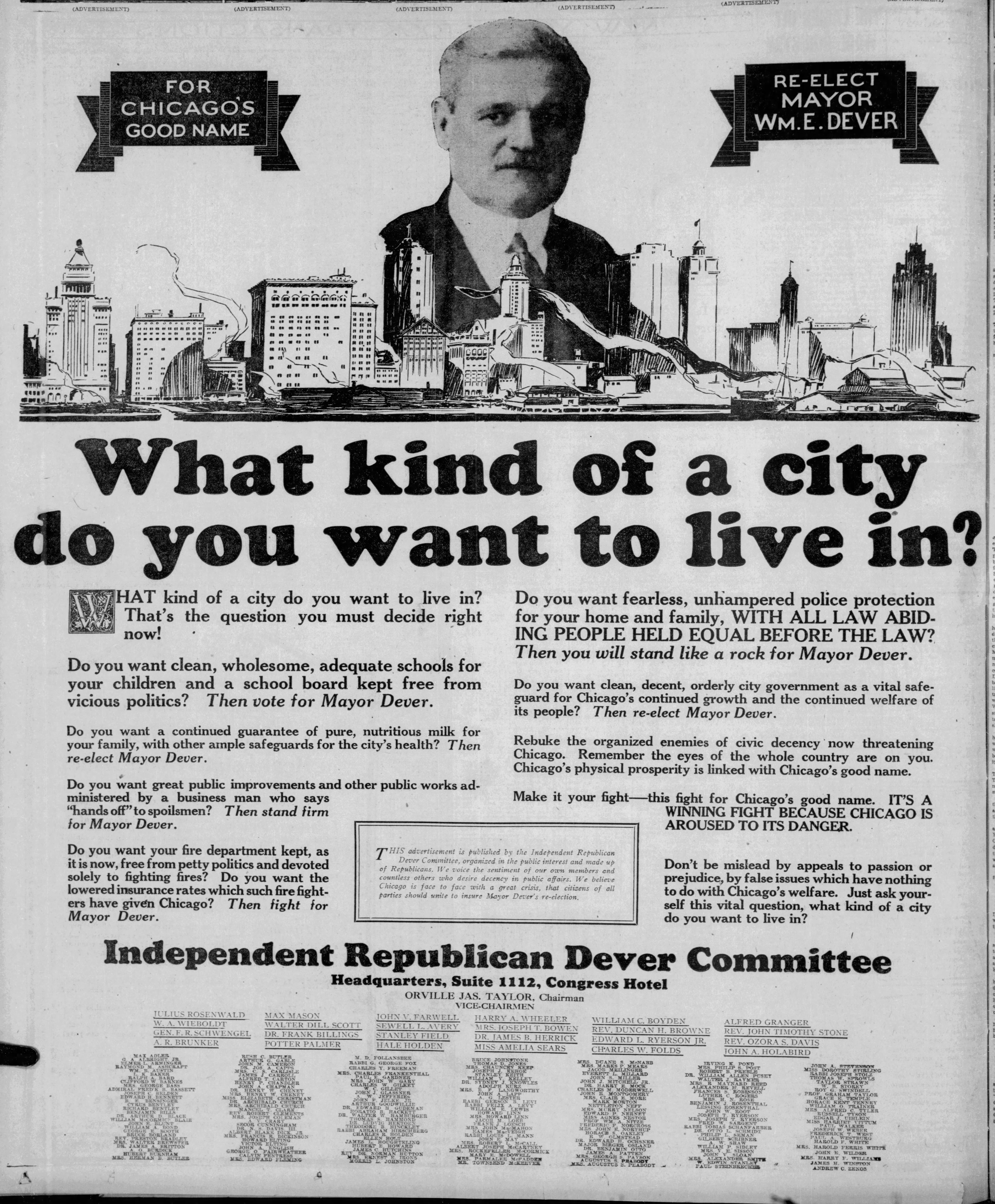
Ad run by the "Independent Republican Dever Committee" in the Chicago Tribune in support of Dever's 1927 reelection campaign

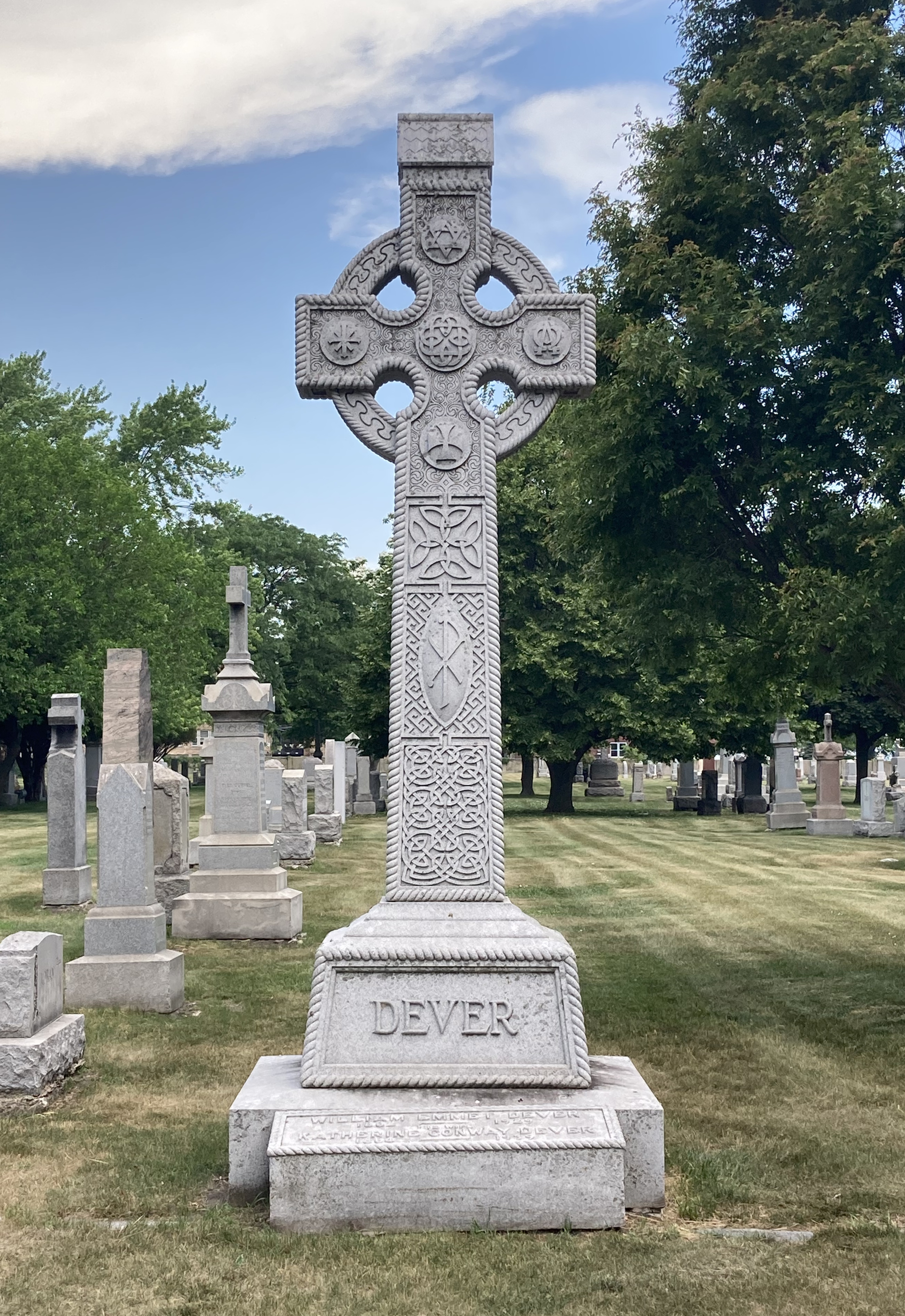
Dever's grave at Calvary Cemetery

Dever ran for re-election in 1927 against "Big Bill" Thompson, who defeated him by 83,000 votes.

Dever's term as mayor ended April 18, 1927.

== Later years ==
Dever went on to serve as a vice-president of a local bank, but took a leave of absence and died of cancer in 1929. He is buried in Calvary Cemetery in Evanston, Illinois.

== Notes ==
Preceded by William Hale Thompson	Mayor of Chicago; 1923–1927	Succeeded by William Hale Thompson
