= Loyola University Chicago School of Law =

Religious university in Chicago, Illinois, US

- Motto: Ad majorem Dei gloriam
- Established: 1908
- School type: Private
- Dean: Michèle Alexandre
- Location: Chicago, Illinois, US
- Enrollment: 905 (2022)
- USNWR ranking: 70th (tie) (2026)
- Website: luc.edu/law

Loyola University Chicago School of Law is the law school of Loyola University Chicago, a private Jesuit research university in Chicago. Established in 1908, Loyola University Chicago School of Law offers degrees and combined degree programs, including the Juris Doctor, Master of Laws, and Doctor of Juridical Science degrees.

== Administration ==
Michèle Alexandre has served as dean of the law school since 2022. Alexandre is the 14th dean of the law school and previously was dean at Stetson University College of Law from 2019 to 2022. Alexandre replaced former dean Michael J. Kaufman, who assumed the role in 2016.

== Admissions ==
For the class entering in 2024, the law school accepted 43.02% of applicants, with 18.74% of those accepted enrolling. The median enrollee had a 160 LSAT score and 3.6 undergraduate GPA. One student was not included in the GPA calculation. Its 25th/75th percentile LSAT scores and GPAs were 157/163 and 3.42/3.75.

== Academics ==
There are fourteen major degree programs offered at the School of Law: juris doctor (JD); master of laws (LLM) in either business law, child and family law, health law or tax law. Specialized certificates are available in advocacy, child and family law, health law, international law and practice, public interest law, tax law, and transactional law. Students may pursue a master of jurisprudence (M.J.) in either business and compliance law, child and family law, health law, global competition, and rule of law for development. There are two major doctoral degrees: doctor of juridical sciences in health law and policy (S.J.D.) which is the highest degree any attorney may obtain in the United States and the doctor of laws (D.Law).

Dual degree programs are offered with the Loyola University Chicago School of Social Work (J.D./M.S.W. and M.J./M.S.W.), Department of Political Science (J.D./M.A.), Graduate School of Education (J.D./M.A. in International Comparative Law and Education) and the Graduate School of Business (J.D./M.B.A.). Loyola offers a master of laws and master of jurisprudence in rule of law for development at the University's John Felice Rome Center in Italy. Loyola offers seven online degree programs and online certificate programs in school discipline reform and privacy law. Additionally, Loyola Chicago Law is known for a significant orientation in public interest and social justice. The school's Curt and Linda Rodin Center for Social Justice Fellowship is widely recognized as one of the most prestigious public interest and social justice fellowships of its kind.

Loyola has a grading curve to uphold a 3.0 median GPA.

The total cost of attendance (tuition and fees) in the full-time JD Program for the 2023-2024 academic year is $55,838. The total cost of attendance (tuition and fees) in the weekend JD Program for the 2023–2024 academic year is $42,050.

== Rankings ==
Loyola's 2026 U.S. News & World Report national ranking was tied for 70th for its full time program, and 15th for its part-time program. Loyola has been highly ranked in health law (4th nationally in 2026)

== Bar examination passage ==
According to the ABA-required disclosure of Bar Passage Results for 2022, in calendar year 2021, Loyola University Chicago School of Law had a total of 236 graduates. The school had a total of 207 graduates who sat for their first bar examination within any jurisdiction. Out of those who sat for their first bar examination in calendar year 2021, a total of 170, or 82.13%, passed on their first attempt.

== Employment ==
According to the American Bar Association-required disclosures, 73.0% of the class of 2019 obtained bar passage-required employment (i.e. as attorneys) within ten months of graduation. An additional 13.7% of the class of 2019 obtained J.D. advantage employment within ten months of graduation.

== Student involvement ==
Law students at Loyola participate in over fifty student organizations and advocacy programs and eight law journals and publications: Loyola University Chicago Law Journal, Annals of Health Law and Life Sciences, Children's Legal Rights Journal, International Law Review, Journal of Regulatory Compliance, Journal on Rule of Law (PROLAW), Loyola Consumer Law Review, and the Public Interest Law Reporter.

== Notable alumni ==
- Jarrett M. Adams, criminal defense attorney, author, and exoneree; first exoneree hired as a staff attorney by the Innocence Project
- Peg McDonnell Breslin, member of the Illinois House of Representatives from 1977–1991 and the first woman elected (outside of Cook County) to the Illinois Appellate Court
- James Milton Burns, United States Federal Judge, United States District Court for the District of Oregon
- Joseph Carroll, founding director of the Defense Intelligence Agency (DIA), and founding director of the Air Force Office of Special Investigations (AFOSI)
- David H. Coar, United States Federal Judge, United States District Court for the Northern District of Illinois
- Suzanne B. Conlon, United States Federal Judge, United States District Court for the Northern District of Illinois
- Philip H. Corboy Sr., personal injury and aviation litigation attorney, named in The National Law Journal's Profiles in Power and The Best Lawyers in America
- A. L. Cronin, Illinois state legislator and lawyer
- John Darrah, United States Federal Judge, United States District Court for the Northern District of Illinois
- Tom Dart (1987), Sheriff of Cook County, Illinois
- Joyce Karlin Fahey, former federal prosecutor, Los Angeles County Superior Court judge, and two-term mayor of Manhattan Beach, California
- John Phil Gilbert, United States Federal Judge, United States District Court for the Southern District of Illinois
- John Harris, Rod Blagojevich Chief of Staff
- William Thomas Hart, United States Federal Judge, United States District Court for the Northern District of Illinois
- Neil Hartigan, former Illinois Attorney General, Lieutenant Governor, and a judge of the Illinois Appellate Court
- Donald L. Hollowell, civil rights attorney instrumental in winning the desegregation of the University of Georgia in 1961
- Henry Hyde, U.S. congressman (1975–2007)
- Daniel Hynes, former Comptroller of Illinois, 2010 candidate for Governor of Illinois
- Virginia Mary Kendall, United States Federal Judge, United States District Court for the Northern District of Illinois
- Louis A. Lehr, Jr., of Arnstein & Lehr, civil defense litigation attorney who has represented major corporations in 44 states, Puerto Rico and Mexico
- Lisa Madigan, former attorney general of Illinois
- Michael Madigan, former Speaker of the Illinois House of Representatives and former chairman of the Democratic Party of Illinois
- Howard Thomas Markey, first chief judge of the United States Court of Appeals for the Federal Circuit
- Frank James McGarr, former United States Federal Judge, United States District Court for the Northern District of Illinois
- Mary Ann G. McMorrow, former chief justice, Supreme Court of Illinois
- James Mulvaney, lawyer and investment banker, president of the United States National Bank of San Diego, president of the San Diego Padres (PCL)
- Kevin Olickal, Illinois State Representative for the 16th district
- Dan Proft, political writer, radio talk show host and 2010 Illinois gubernatorial candidate.
- Mike Quigley, U.S. congressman from Illinois' 5th District
- William Quinlan, former Illinois state appellate court justice, former Chicago Corporation Counsel, and former parliamentarian for the Cook County Board of Commissioners
- Elizabeth Rochford, lawyer from Illinois who serves an assoc. judge of Illinois' 19th Judicial Circuit.
- Edith S. Sampson, alternate U.S. delegate to the United Nations, member of the UN's Social, Humanitarian, and Cultural Committee, member of the U.S. Commission for UNESCO, U.S. representative to NATO, first black woman to be elected as a judge in Illinois
- Thomas P. Sullivan, United States Attorney for the Northern District of Illinois
- Robert R. Thomas, Chief Justice of the Supreme Court of Illinois
- Dan K. Webb, Chairman & Partner, Winston & Strawn LLP
- Corinne Wood, first female Lieutenant Governor of Illinois (1999–2003)
