= Armslist =

Classified advertisements website

Armslist LLC
- Company type: Private company
- Website type: Classifieds, forums
- Available in: English
- Founded: 2007; 19 years ago
- Area served: United States
- Founders: Jon Gibbon & Brian Mancini
- Services: Web communications
- Website: www.armslist.com
- Registration: Optional
- Launched: 2007
- Current status: Active

Armslist.com is a classified advertisements website with sections devoted to firearms, firearms accessories, outdoors equipment, miscellaneous firearms related materials, and discussion forums. Armslist has drawn criticism and support due to it facilitating the legal sale of firearms between individuals online.

== History ==
Armslist.com was founded in 2007 by Jon Gibbon and Brian Mancini. Both met at the Air Force Academy and came up with the idea after reading that craigslist was banning all gun related ads. They decided to create an online classifieds website where gun sellers could post ads and the site eventually expanded beyond solely firearms listings and into other firearms related products. Ever since its founding the site has greatly expanded and now hosts thousands of listings at a time.

== Site Characteristics ==
Before any user can enter the site they must agree to a statement that they are 21 years old, will follow all local, state and federal laws, they will not use Armslist for any illegal purposes, and several other smaller clauses. The site is formatted with 6 different sections and multiple subsections along with sections dedicated to each state in the United States and regions of those states so that buyers can find local sellers. The sections are Firearms, Firearms accessories, Outdoors gear, Other items, Firearms related events, and Firearms services. The largest section is Firearms which has subsections for antique firearms, handguns, muzzle loaders, National Firearms Act related firearms, rifles, and shotguns. Each listing provides a location and a way to contact the seller and in many cases, picture of the items.

== Lawsuits ==
Armslist has faced criticism from many gun control groups because of its business model which provides a way for people to find each other online in order to buy and sell firearms privately and in many cases without a background check. In late 2012 the Brady Campaign filed a lawsuit against Armslist on behalf of the family of Jitka Vesel, a woman who was killed by her stalker, Demetry Smirnov, who was a Russian immigrant living in Canada. They claimed that Armslist was negligent by allowing him to purchase a weapon privately out of state, even though he was ineligible to purchase any firearms and private firearm sales with handguns are restricted to in-state sales. Armslist responded to the lawsuit by pointing out that site has a disclaimer advising users to follow all federal and state firearms laws. In August 2013 the lawsuit was dismissed by Federal District Court Judge Charles Norgle finding that "The Defendant owes no duty to the general public to operate its website to control private individual users’ sale of handguns." In August 2014, the Seventh Circuit Court of Appeals affirmed that decision.

On April 30, 2019, the Wisconsin Supreme Court ruled that Armslist was immune from liability under the Communications Decency Act. The US Supreme Court declined to hear the case.

Armslist was also successful in dismissing a lawsuit in the Massachusetts Superior Court in May 2020 based on Section 230 of the Communications Decency Act.

== See also ==
- Craigslist
- Backpage
