= Ronald Guzman =

Ronald Guzman may refer to:

- Ronald A. Guzman (born 1948), United States federal judge
- Ronald Guzmán (born 1994), baseball player
