= Andrew S. Boutros =

American lawyer

Andrew Boutros
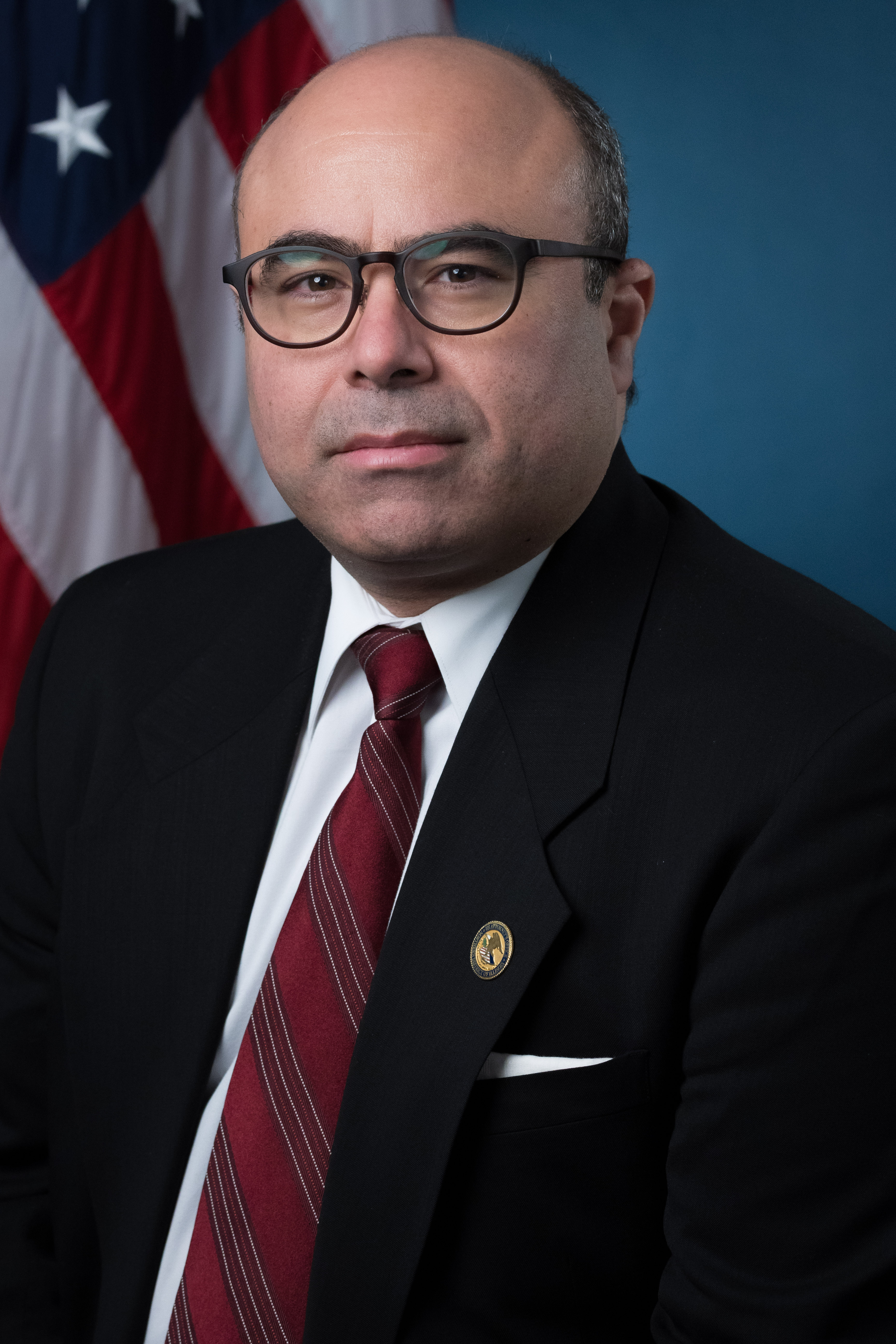

United States Attorney for the Northern District of Illinois
- Incumbent
- Assumed office April 7, 2025; Interim: April 7, 2025 – August 5, 2025
- President: Donald Trump
- Preceded by: Morris Pasqual

Personal details
- Education: Virginia Tech (BS); University of Virginia (JD)

Andrew S. Boutros is an American lawyer, law professor, and former federal prosecutor, who has served as the United States Attorney for the Northern District of Illinois since April 2025. He has prosecuted corporate fraud and cybercrime cases, including Chicago-based Silk Road cases. He was elected to the American Law Institute in 2015. He was the Regional Chair of Dechert LLP's White Collar practice, based in the firm's Chicago and Washington, D.C., offices.

In May 2026, Boutros dismissed all charges in the "Broadview Six" immigration protest case after his staff's grand jury misconduct was revealed. He received judicial criticism for continuing to defend the prosecution's underlying merits, after what the trial judge described as the worst prosecutorial misconduct she had ever seen during the case's grand jury phase, all of which occurred on Boutros's watch.

== Education and early career ==
Boutros is a first-generation American whose parents emigrated from Egypt. He earned his undergraduate degree from Virginia Tech, graduating summa cum laude. He then atttended the University of Virginia School of Law where he received his J.D. in 2001. Jeffrey O'Connell, one of Boutros's academic mentors in law school, co-authored with him an article on tort reform that appeared in the Notre Dame Law Review. After law school, Boutros clerked for the Judge Eugene E. Siler Jr. of the United States Court of Appeals for the Sixth Circuit. He then worked as a defense attorney in the Washington, D.C., office of an international law firm, where he helped launch and run the firm's Foreign Corrupt Practices Act (FCPA) group.

== Legal career ==
=== Assistant U.S. Attorney ===
In 2007, U.S. Attorney Patrick Fitzgerald hired Boutros as an Assistant U.S. Attorney for the Northern District of Illinois. He moved to Chicago and began working on January 7, 2008. He was a member of the Financial Crimes and Special Prosecutions unit at the office. Over nearly eight years, Boutros prosecuted cases involving white-collar crimes, fraud, money-laundering, drug trafficking and cybercrime.

His work included prosecuting individuals connected to the Silk Road online black market. He assisted in the prosecution Ross Ulbricht, the founder of Silk Road, who received a life sentence after conviction before being fully and unconditionally pardoned by Donald Trump. He also led the prosecution of Cornelis Jan "SuperTrips" Slomp, described by the government as the Silk Road's "most prolific online drug dealer, who received a ten-year prison sentence in May 2015.

Boutros also served as the prosecutor in what was called the "largest food fraud in U.S. history" or "Honeygate". The first phase of the operation targeted individuals and companies involved in illegally importing cheap, and occasionally contaminated, honey from China. That phase resulted in $80 million in losses. The second phase focused on those illegally buying and shipping the illegally imported Chinese honey amounted to $180 million in losses. The total fraud in "Project Honeygate" was estimated at $260 million.

Among Boutros' early cases was a healthcare prosecution. In 2008, he charged Peter G. Rogan, owner of Chicago's Edgewater Medical Center,with perjury and obstruction of justice. Rogan owed $188 million in civil judgments, largely for Medicare fraud. Rogan evaded capture in Canada for seven years. In 2015, as one of his final acts as a federal prosecutor, Boutros represented the government in the case against Rogan, who was sentenced to 21 months in prison.

=== Private practice and teaching ===
In October 2015, Boutros joined Chicago-based law firm Seyfarth Shaw as National Co-Chair of its White Collar, Internal Investigations and False Claims practice, ending his nearly eight-year career with the U.S. Attorney's Office in Chicago. In September 2019, he joined Dechert LLP as Regional Chair of the U.S. white-collar practice. He worked in both the Chicago and Washington, D.C. offices of Dechert. Since 2011, Boutros has been a lecturer in law at the University of Chicago Law School, where he teaches an advanced course on corporate criminal prosecutions and investigations.

=== U.S. Attorney for the Northern District of Illinois ===
On April 7, 2025, Boutros took the oath of office as United States Attorney for the Northern District of Illinois under 120-day appointment by Attorney General Pamela Bondi. On July 24, 2025, the U.S. District Court in Chicago entered an order approving the appointment, effective August 5, 2025.

In May 2026, Boutros made a rare personal courtroom appearance to dismiss all remaining charges against the "Broadview Six," a group of political figures and activists indicted in October 2025 for protesting outside of an Immigration and Customs Enforcement (ICE) facility. The dismissal followed disclosures of extensive prosecutorial misconduct by the assistant U.S. Attorneys handling the grand jury proceedings, which included improper "prosecutorial vouching" and the dismissal of grand jurors who openly disagreed with the government's case. While Boutros stated he was entirely unaware of the specific grand jury infractions until late April 2026 and took official responsibility for his office's failures, he heavily criticized the defendants' behavior during the dismissal hearing, calling it "unacceptable in a civilized society." This drew a sharp rebuke from U.S. District Judge April Perry, who admonished Boutros for "significantly undercutting" his apology by continuing to publicly vilify the defendants. In the aftermath of the "Broadview Six" case, over one hundred former United States District Court for the Northern District of Illinois prosecutors signed a public letter stating that Boutros "tarnished the reputation" of the office due to a "failure of leadership" and because "once-forbidden political considerations are infecting prosecutorial decisions".

In May 2026, The New York Times reported that Boutros had opened an investigation into whether E. Jean Carroll, a former magazine writer whom President Trump sexually assaulted and defamed, committed perjury in her civil lawsuits against Trump. The investigation focuses on whether she was truthful about the funding of her legal bills by a nonprofit founded by billionaire Reid Hoffman, a prominent critic of Trump's.

While Boutros has presided over the federal prosecutor's office in Chicago, grand juries have rejected several of the office's attempts to bring charges, a setback that The New York Times called "a once-rare rebuke," and so many high-level staffers have left that Boutros had to send out a letter inviting recent retirees to come back to work.

In August 2026, The New York Times reported that in August 2025 Boutros had subpoenaed a Democratic fund-raising firm whose vice president was Judge Juan Merchan's daughter Loren until late 2024 for internal communications with clients that included former vice president Kamala Harris, former president Joe Biden, Governor Kathy Hochul of New York, Representative Hakeem Jeffries of New York, and the Democratic National Committee. Prosecutors later limited the subpoena to a $468 payment from Harris's 2024 presidential campaign and emails between Merchan and his daughter. According to The New York Times, the "language in the subpoena is virtually identical to claims made" by a House committee that Trump's conviction in the New York hush-money trial was "potentially politically motivated".

== Recognition and awards ==
Boutros is a member of the American Law Institute and the American Bar Foundation. He is the national co-founder and co-chair of the American Bar Association's (ABA) Criminal Justice Section's Global Anti-Corruption Committee and is a voting member of the ABA Criminal Justice Section Council. The Federal Law Enforcement Officers Association gave him the National Prosecutorial Award in 2015, and the ABA gave him the Norm Maleng Minister of Justice Award in 2014.

== Publications ==
- "Treating Medical Malpractice Claims under a Variant of the Business Judgment Rule", with Jeffrey O'Connell, 77 Notre Dame Law Rev. 373 (2002)
- "Deferred Prosecution Agreements: A View from the Trenches and a Proposal for Reform", with F. Joseph Warin, 93 Va. L. Rev. Brief 121 (2007–2008)
- "Carbon Copy Prosecutions: A Growing Anticorruption Phenomenon in a Shrinking World", with T. Markus Funk, 2012 U. Chi. Legal F. 259 (2012)
- "Another Bite at the Apple: Transnational Crimes Face Repeat Punishment", 39 Litig. 43 (2013)
- The ABA Compliance Officer's Deskbook, with James T. O'Reilly, T. Markus Funk (2018)
