= Nancy L. Maldonado =

American judge (born 1975)

Nancy Maldonado
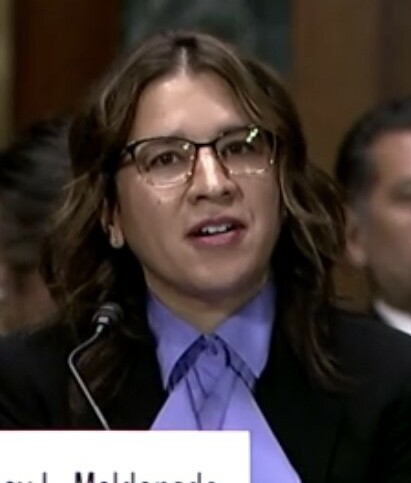

Judge of the United States Court of Appeals for the Seventh Circuit
- Incumbent
- Assumed office July 11, 2024
- Appointed by: Joe Biden
- Preceded by: Ilana Rovner

Judge of the United States District Court for the Northern District of Illinois
- In office August 10, 2022 – July 11, 2024
- Appointed by: Joe Biden
- Preceded by: Matthew Kennelly
- Succeeded by: April Perry

Personal details
- Born: 1975 (age 50–51) Skokie, Illinois, U.S.
- Education: Harvard University (BA); Columbia University (JD)

Nancy Lee Maldonado (born 1975) is an American lawyer from Chicago who has served as a United States circuit judge of the United States Court of Appeals for the Seventh Circuit since 2024. She previously served as a United States district judge of the United States District Court for the Northern District of Illinois from 2022 to 2024.

== Early life and education ==
Maldonado was born in 1975, in Skokie, Illinois. She received a Bachelor of Arts, cum laude, from Harvard College in 1997 and a Juris Doctor from Columbia Law School in 2001.

== Career ==
Maldonado previously served as a law clerk for Judge Rubén Castillo of the United States District Court for the Northern District of Illinois from 2001 to 2003. In 2003, she joined the law firm of Miner, Barnhill & Galland in Chicago as an associate until 2009 when she was elevated to partner in 2010. She went on to work as partner until 2022 when she was appointed as a district judge.

=== Federal judicial service ===
==== District court service ====
In December 2021, Maldonado was recommended to the president by Senators Dick Durbin and Tammy Duckworth. On April 13, 2022, President Joe Biden announced his intent to nominate Maldonado to serve as a United States District Judge of the United States District Court for the Northern District of Illinois. On April 25, 2022, her nomination was sent to the Senate. President Biden nominated Maldonado to the seat vacated by Judge Matthew Kennelly, who assumed senior status on October 7, 2021. On May 11, 2022, a hearing on her nomination was held before the Senate Judiciary Committee. On June 9, 2022, her nomination was reported out of committee by a 13–9 vote. On July 19, 2022, the United States Senate invoked cloture on her nomination by a 53–41 vote. She was confirmed on the same day by a 53–45 vote. She received her judicial commission on August 10, 2022. She was sworn in on October 3, 2022. She became the first Hispanic woman to serve as a federal judge on the Court for the Northern District of Illinois. Her service as a district judge was terminated on July 11, 2024, when she was elevated to the court of appeals.

==== Court of appeals service ====
On February 21, 2024, President Joe Biden announced his intent to nominate Maldonado to serve as a United States circuit judge of the United States Court of Appeals for the Seventh Circuit. On February 27, 2024, her nomination was sent to the Senate. President Biden nominated Maldonado to the seat being vacated by Judge Ilana Rovner, who announced her intent to assume senior status upon confirmation of a successor. On March 20, 2024, a hearing on her nomination was held before the Senate Judiciary Committee. During her confirmation hearing, she was questioned by Republican senators over her case backlog, as, with 125 motions having been pending for more than six months without a ruling, Maldonado held one of the largest case backlogs of any federal trial court judge in the nation. On April 18, 2024, her nomination was reported out of committee by an 11–10 party-line vote. On June 20, 2024, the Senate invoked cloture on her nomination by a 43–27 vote. On July 8, 2024, her nomination was confirmed by a 47–43 vote, with Senators Joe Manchin and Kyrsten Sinema voting against confirmation. She received her judicial commission on July 11, 2024. She became the first Hispanic judge to serve on the Seventh Circuit.

== See also ==
- List of Hispanic and Latino American jurists

Legal offices
| Preceded by Matthew Kennelly | Judge of the United States District Court for the Northern District of Illinois; 2022–2024 | Succeeded by April Perry |
| Preceded by Ilana Rovner | Judge of the United States Court of Appeals for the Seventh Circuit; 2024–present | Incumbent |
