= Matthew Kennelly =

American judge (born 1956)

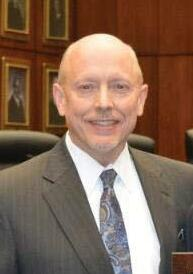
- Kennelly in 2019

Senior Judge of the United States District Court for the Northern District of Illinois
- Incumbent
- Assumed office October 7, 2021

Judge of the United States District Court for the Northern District of Illinois
- In office April 22, 1999 – October 7, 2021
- Appointed by: Bill Clinton
- Preceded by: Paul Edward Plunkett
- Succeeded by: Nancy L. Maldonado

Personal details
- Born: October 6, 1956 (age 69) Marion, Indiana, U.S.
- Education: University of Notre Dame (BA); Harvard University (JD)

Matthew Francis Kennelly (born October 6, 1956) is a senior United States district judge of the United States District Court for the Northern District of Illinois.

== Education and career ==
Kennelly was born in 1956 in Marion, Indiana. He graduated from University of Notre Dame with a Bachelor of Arts degree in 1978 and Harvard Law School with a Juris Doctor in 1981, where he was Executive Director of the Harvard Legal Aid Bureau. He served in private practice in Chicago, Illinois, from 1981 to 1982. He served as a law clerk for Judge Prentice Marshall of the United States District Court for the Northern District of Illinois from 1982 to 1984. He reentered private practice in 1984 and served in that capacity until his appointment to the federal bench in 1999.

== Federal judicial service ==
On January 26, 1999, Bill Clinton nominated Kennelly to be a judge on the United States District Court for the Northern District of Illinois to a seat vacated by Paul Edward Plunkett. He was confirmed by the United States Senate on April 15, 1999, and received his commission on April 22, 1999. He assumed senior status on October 7, 2021.

== Notable rulings ==
He gained widespread attention when he presided over the case of ACLU v. AT&T in 2006, "a lawsuit filed by the American Civil Liberties Union of Illinois on behalf of author Studs Terkel and other activists who said their constitutional rights were violated because of an NSA program of gathering phone company records."

The court is persuaded that requiring AT&T to confirm or deny whether it has disclosed large quantities of telephone records to the federal government could give adversaries of this country valuable insight into the government's intelligence activities.

Kennelly ruled that Terkel and the other plaintiffs in the lawsuit did not show that their particular records were seen by the government; therefore, they had no standing in suing the government.

Legal offices
Preceded by Paul Edward Plunkett	Judge of the United States District Court for the Northern District of Illinois; 1999–2021	Succeeded by Nancy L. Maldonado
