= Sara Ellis =

Sara Ellis may refer to:

- Sara L. Ellis (born 1969), Canadian-born American federal judge in the Northern District of Illinois
- Sara Ellis (White Collar), character on the USA Network TV series White Collar

== See also ==
- Sarah Ellis (disambiguation)
