= Iain D. Johnston =

American judge (born 1965)

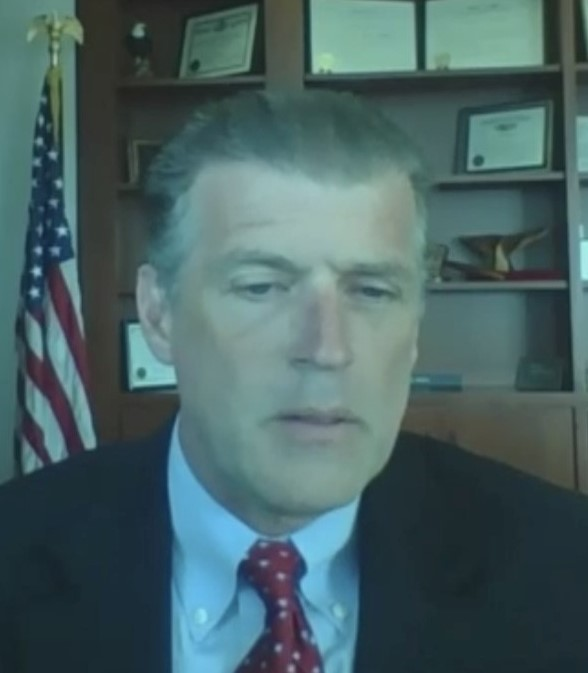

Judge of the United States District Court for the Northern District of Illinois
- Incumbent
- Assumed office September 23, 2020
- Appointed by: Donald Trump
- Preceded by: Frederick J. Kapala

Magistrate Judge of the United States District Court for the Northern District of Illinois
- In office May 3, 2013 – September 23, 2020
- Preceded by: P. Michael Mahoney
- Succeeded by: Margaret J. Schneider

Personal details
- Born: 1965 (age 60–61) Chicago, Illinois, U.S.
- Education: Rockford University (BA); John Marshall Law School (JD)

Iain David Johnston (born 1965) is a United States district judge of the United States District Court for the Northern District of Illinois and a former United States magistrate judge of the same court.

== Education ==
Johnston earned his Bachelor of Science, cum laude, from Rockford University in 1987 and his Juris Doctor, cum laude, from John Marshall Law School (now University of Illinois Chicago School of Law) in 1990.

== Career ==
Johnston served as a law clerk to Judge Philip Godfrey Reinhard of the Illinois Second District Appellate Court and then the United States District Court for the Northern District of Illinois. He was a unit supervisor for the Office of the Illinois Attorney General and in private practice at Altheimer & Gray, Holland & Knight, and Johnston Greene. He also serves as an adjunct professor at University of Illinois Chicago School of Law.

=== Federal judicial service ===
Johnston served as a United States magistrate judge of the United States District Court for the Northern District of Illinois, from May 3, 2013, to September 23, 2020, when he became a district judge.

On February 5, 2020, President Donald Trump announced his intent to nominate Johnston to serve as a United States district judge of the United States District Court for the Northern District of Illinois. On February 12, 2020, his nomination was sent to the Senate. Trump nominated Johnston to the seat vacated by Judge Frederick J. Kapala, who assumed senior status on May 10, 2019. A hearing on his nomination before the Senate Judiciary Committee was held on June 24, 2020. On July 30, 2020, his nomination was reported out of committee by a 17–5 vote. On September 16, 2020, the United States Senate invoked cloture on his nomination by an 81–15 vote. On September 17, 2020, his nomination was confirmed by a 77–14 vote. He received his judicial commission on September 23, 2020. He was sworn in on September 29, 2020.

== Membership ==
He was a member of the Federalist Society from 1995 to 1998.

Legal offices
Preceded by Frederick J. Kapala	Judge of the United States District Court for the Northern District of Illinois; 2020–present	Incumbent
