= Alexander J. Napoli =

American judge

Judge of the United States District Court for the Northern District of Illinois
- In office September 21, 1966 – July 12, 1972
- Appointed by: Lyndon B. Johnson
- Preceded by: Seat established by 80 Stat. 75
- Succeeded by: Prentice Marshall

Judge of the Circuit Court of Cook County
- In office 1964–1966

Judge of the Superior Court of Cook County
- In office 1960–1963

Judge of the Municipal Court of Chicago
- In office 1950–1960

Personal details
- Born: Alexander J. Napoli; October 7, 1905 Chicago, Illinois
- Died: July 12, 1972 (aged 66) Chicago, Illinois
- Education: University of Chicago (Ph.B.); University of Chicago Law School (J.D.)

Alexander J. Napoli (October 7, 1905 – July 12, 1972) was a United States district judge of the United States District Court for the Northern District of Illinois.

== Education and career ==
Born in Chicago, Illinois, Napoli received a Bachelor of Philosophy degree from the University of Chicago in 1927 and a J.D. degree from the University of Chicago Law School in 1929. He was in private practice in Chicago from 1929 to 1933. He was an assistant state's attorney of Cook County, Illinois from 1933 to 1950. He was a judge of the Municipal Court of Chicago from 1950 to 1960, of the Superior Court of Cook County from 1960 to 1963, and of the Circuit Court of Cook County from 1964 to 1966.

== Federal judicial service ==
On August 17, 1966, Napoli was nominated by President Lyndon B. Johnson to a new seat on the United States District Court for the Northern District of Illinois created by 80 Stat. 75. He was confirmed by the United States Senate on September 20, 1966, and received his commission on September 21, 1966, serving until his death in Chicago on July 12, 1972.

== See also ==
- List of first minority male lawyers and judges in Illinois

== Sources ==
Legal offices
Preceded by Seat established by 80 Stat. 75	Judge of the United States District Court for the Northern District of Illinois; 1966–1972	Succeeded by Prentice Marshall
