= United States District Court for the Northern District of Illinois =

United States federal district court in Illinois

- (N.D. Ill.)
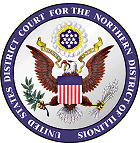

- Map indicating the changing Districts of Illinois
- Location: Everett McKinley Dirksen U.S. Courthouse (Chicago) More locations: Rockford; Wheaton; Freeport
- Appeals to: Seventh Circuit
- Established: February 13, 1855
- Judges: 23
- Chief Judge: Virginia Mary Kendall

Officers of the court
- U.S. Attorney: Andrew S. Boutros
- U.S. Marshal: LaDon A. Reynolds
- www.ilnd.uscourts.gov

The United States District Court for the Northern District of Illinois (in case citations, N.D. Ill.) is the federal trial court with jurisdiction over the northern counties of Illinois. It is one of the busiest federal trial courts in the United States, with famous cases including those of Al Capone and the Chicago Eight.

Appeals from the Northern District of Illinois are taken to the United States Court of Appeals for the Seventh Circuit (except for patent claims and claims against the U.S. government under the Tucker Act, which are appealed to the Federal Circuit).

The United States attorney for the district, representing the United States in litigation in the court, is Andrew S. Boutros since April 7, 2025.

== Organization ==
The court's jurisdiction is split into an eastern division, including Cook, DuPage, McHenry, Grundy, Kane, Kendall, LaSalle, Lake, and Will counties, with its sessions held in Chicago and Wheaton; and a western division, including Boone, Carroll, DeKalb, Jo Daviess, Lee, Ogle, Stephenson, Whiteside, and Winnebago counties, with its sessions held in Freeport and Rockford.

== History ==
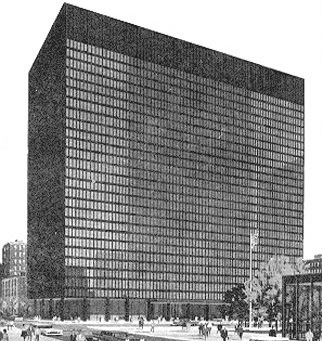
The Dirksen Federal Building in Chicago, one of four locations where the United States District Court for the Northern District of Illinois holds sessions.

The United States District Court for the District of Illinois was established by a statute passed by the United States Congress on March 3, 1819, 3 Stat. 502. The act established a single office for a judge to preside over the court. Initially, the court was not within any existing judicial circuit, and appeals from the court were taken directly to the United States Supreme Court. In 1837, Congress created the United States Court of Appeals for the Seventh Circuit, placing it in Chicago, Illinois and giving it jurisdiction over the District of Illinois, 5 Stat. 176.

The Northern District itself was created by a statute passed on February 13, 1855, 10 Stat. 606, which subdivided the District of Illinois into the Northern and the Southern Districts. The boundaries of the District and the seats of the courts were set forth in the statute:

The counties of Hancock, McDonough, Peoria, Woodford, Livingston, and Iroquois, and all the counties in the said State north of them, shall compose one district, to be called the northern district of Illinois, and courts shall be held for the said district at the city of Chicago; and the residue of the counties of the said State shall compose another district, to be called the southern district of Illinois, and courts shall be held for the same at the city of Springfield.

The district has since been re-organized several times. The United States District Court for the Eastern District of Illinois was created on March 3, 1905, by 33 Stat. 992, by splitting counties out of the Northern and Southern Districts. It was later eliminated in a reorganization on October 2, 1978, which replaced it with a Central District, 92 Stat. 883, formed primarily from parts of the Southern District, and returning some counties to the Northern District.

The Northern District of Illinois, which contains the entire Chicago metropolitan area, accounts for 1,531 of the 1,828 public corruption convictions in the state between 1976 and 2012, almost 84%, also making it the federal district with the most public corruption convictions in the nation between 1976 and 2012.

== Current judges ==
As of September 30, 2026:

#	Title	Judge	Duty station	Born	Term of service			Appointed by
#	Title	Judge	Duty station	Born	Active	Chief	Senior	Appointed by
80	Chief Judge	Virginia Mary Kendall	Chicago	1962	2006–present	2024–present	—	G.W. Bush
82	District Judge	Robert Michael Dow Jr.	Chicago	1965	2007–present	—	—	G.W. Bush
84	District Judge	Sharon Johnson Coleman	Chicago	1960	2010–present	—	—	Obama
85	District Judge	Edmond E. Chang	Chicago	1970	2010–present	—	—	Obama
89	District Judge	Sara L. Ellis	Chicago	1969	2013–present	—	—	Obama
90	District Judge	Andrea Wood	Chicago	1973	2013–present	—	—	Obama
91	District Judge	Manish S. Shah	Chicago	1972	2014–present	—	—	Obama
92	District Judge	Jorge L. Alonso	Chicago	1966	2014–present	—	—	Obama
93	District Judge	John Robert Blakey	Chicago	1965	2014–present	—	—	Obama
94	District Judge	Martha M. Pacold	Chicago	1979	2019–present	—	—	Trump
95	District Judge	Mary M. Rowland	Chicago	1961	2019–present	—	—	Trump
96	District Judge	Steven C. Seeger	Chicago	1971	2019–present	—	—	Trump
97	District Judge	John F. Kness	Chicago	1969	2020–present	—	—	Trump
98	District Judge	Franklin U. Valderrama	Chicago	1962	2020–present	—	—	Trump
99	District Judge	Iain D. Johnston	Rockford	1965	2020–present	—	—	Trump
101	District Judge	Lindsay C. Jenkins	Chicago	1977	2023–present	—	—	Biden
102	District Judge	LaShonda A. Hunt	Chicago	1970	2023–present	—	—	Biden
103	District Judge	Jeremy C. Daniel	Chicago	1978	2023–present	—	—	Biden
104	District Judge	Jeffrey Cummings	Chicago	1962	2023–present	—	—	Biden
105	District Judge	Sunil Harjani	Chicago	1974	2024–present	—	—	Biden
106	District Judge	Georgia N. Alexakis	Chicago	1978	2024–present	—	—	Biden
107	District Judge	April Perry	Chicago	1979	2024–present	—	—	Biden
108	District Judge	vacant	—	—	—	—	—	—
45	Senior Judge	Marvin Aspen	Chicago	1934	1979–2002	1995–2002	2002–present	Carter
47	Senior Judge	Charles P. Kocoras	Chicago	1938	1980–2006	2002–2006	2006–present	Carter
53	Senior Judge	Charles Ronald Norgle Sr.	inactive	1937	1984–2022	—	2022–present	Reagan
60	Senior Judge	Suzanne B. Conlon	inactive	1939	1988–2004	—	2004–present	Reagan
61	Senior Judge	George M. Marovich	inactive	1931	1988–2000	—	2000–present	Reagan
64	Senior Judge	Philip Godfrey Reinhard	Rockford	1941	1992–2007	—	2007–present	G.H.W. Bush
68	Senior Judge	Robert Gettleman	Chicago	1943	1994–2009	—	2009–present	Clinton
69	Senior Judge	Elaine E. Bucklo	Chicago	1944	1994–2009	—	2009–present	Clinton
70	Senior Judge	Joan B. Gottschall	Chicago	1947	1996–2012	—	2012–present	Clinton
71	Senior Judge	Rebecca R. Pallmeyer	Chicago	1954	1998–2024	2019–2024	2024–present	Clinton
73	Senior Judge	Matthew Kennelly	Chicago	1956	1999–2021	—	2021–present	Clinton
74	Senior Judge	Ronald A. Guzman	Chicago	1948	1999–2014	—	2014–present	Clinton
75	Senior Judge	Joan Lefkow	Chicago	1944	2000–2012	—	2012–present	Clinton
81	Senior Judge	Frederick J. Kapala	inactive	1950	2007–2019	—	2019–present	G.W. Bush
87	Senior Judge	John Tharp	Chicago	1960	2012–2026	—	2026–present	Obama
88	Senior Judge	Thomas M. Durkin	Chicago	1953	2012–2023	—	2023–present	Obama

== Vacancies and pending nominations ==
Seat	Prior judge's duty station	Seat last held by	Vacancy reason	Date of vacancy	Nominee	Date of nomination
10	Chicago	John Tharp	Senior status	September 30, 2026	–	–

== Former judges ==
#	Judge	Born–died	Active service	Chief Judge	Senior status	Appointed by	Reason for termination
1	Thomas Drummond	1809–1890	1855–1869 (Note: Reassigned from the District of Illinois.)	—	—	Taylor/Operation of law	elevation
2	Henry Williams Blodgett	1821–1905	1870–1892	—	—	Grant	retirement
3	Peter S. Grosscup	1852–1921	1892–1899	—	—	B. Harrison	elevation
4	Christian Cecil Kohlsaat	1844–1918	1899–1905	—	—	McKinley	elevation
5	Solomon Hicks Bethea	1852–1909	1905–1909	—	—	T. Roosevelt	death
6	Kenesaw Mountain Landis	1866–1944	1905–1922	—	—	T. Roosevelt	resignation
7	George Albert Carpenter	1867–1944	1910–1933	—	—	Taft	resignation
8	James Herbert Wilkerson	1869–1948	1922–1940	—	1940–1948	Harding	death
9	Adam C. Cliffe	1869–1928	1922–1928	—	—	Harding	death
10	Charles Edgar Woodward	1876–1942	1929–1942	—	—	Coolidge	death
11	John P. Barnes	1881–1959	1931–1957	1948–1957	1957–1958	Hoover	resignation
12	George E. Q. Johnson	1874–1949	1932–1933 (Note: Recess appointment; the United States Senate later rejected the appointment.)	—	—	Hoover	not confirmed
13	William Harrison Holly	1869–1958	1933–1943 (Note: Recess appointment; formally nominated on January 8, 1934, confirmed by the Senate on February 20, 1934, and received commission on March 1, 1934.)	—	1943–1958	F. Roosevelt	death
14	Philip Leo Sullivan	1889–1960	1933–1960	1957–1959	—	F. Roosevelt	death
15	Michael L. Igoe	1885–1967	1938–1965 (Note: Recess appointment; formally nominated on January 5, 1939, confirmed by the Senate on February 9, 1939, and received commission on March 4, 1939.)	—	1965–1967	F. Roosevelt	death
16	William Joseph Campbell	1905–1988	1940–1970	1959–1970	1970–1988	F. Roosevelt	death
17	Walter J. LaBuy	1888–1967	1944–1961	—	1961–1967	F. Roosevelt	death
18	Elwyn Riley Shaw	1888–1950	1944–1950	—	—	F. Roosevelt	death
19	Joseph Sam Perry	1896–1984	1951–1971	—	1971–1984	Truman	death
20	Julius Hoffman	1895–1983	1953–1972	—	1972–1983	Eisenhower	death
21	Winfred George Knoch	1895–1983	1953–1958	—	—	Eisenhower	elevation
22	Julius Howard Miner	1896–1963	1958–1963	—	—	Eisenhower	death
23	Edwin Albert Robson	1905–1986	1958–1975 (Note: Recess appointment; formally nominated on January 17, 1959, confirmed by the Senate on April 29, 1959, and received commission on April 30, 1959.)	1970–1975	1975–1986	Eisenhower	death
24	Richard Bevan Austin	1901–1977	1961–1975	—	1975–1977	Kennedy	death
25	James Benton Parsons	1911–1993	1961–1981	1975–1981	1981–1993	Kennedy	death
26	Hubert Louis Will	1914–1995	1961–1979	—	1979–1995	Kennedy	death
27	Bernard Martin Decker	1904–1993	1962–1980 (Note: Recess appointment; formally nominated on January 15, 1963, confirmed by the Senate on March 28, 1963, and received commission on April 2, 1963.)	—	1980–1993	Kennedy	death
28	Abraham Lincoln Marovitz	1905–2001	1963–1975	—	1975–2001	Kennedy	death
29	William Joseph Lynch	1908–1976	1966–1976	—	—	L. Johnson	death
30	Alexander J. Napoli	1905–1972	1966–1972	—	—	L. Johnson	death
31	Frank James McGarr	1921–2012	1970–1986	1981–1986	1986–1988	Nixon	retirement
32	Thomas Roberts McMillen	1916–2002	1971–1984	—	1984–1985	Nixon	retirement
33	William J. Bauer	1926–2025	1971–1975	—	—	Nixon	elevation
34	Richard Wellington McLaren	1918–1976	1972–1976	—	—	Nixon	death
35	Philip Willis Tone	1923–2001	1972–1974	—	—	Nixon	elevation
36	Prentice Marshall	1926–2004	1973–1988	—	1988–1996	Nixon	retirement
37	Joel Flaum	1936–2024	1974–1983	—	—	Ford	elevation
38	Alfred Younges Kirkland Sr.	1917–2004	1974–1979	—	1979–2004	Ford	death
39	John F. Grady	1929–2019	1975–1994	1986–1990	1994–2019	Ford	death
40	George N. Leighton	1912–2018	1976–1986	—	1986–1987	Ford	retirement
41	John Powers Crowley	1936–1989	1976–1981	—	—	Ford	resignation
42	Stanley Julian Roszkowski	1923–2014	1977–1991	—	1991–1998	Carter	retirement
43	Nicholas John Bua	1925–2002	1977–1991	—	—	Carter	retirement
44	James Byron Moran	1930–2009	1979–1995	1990–1995	1995–2009	Carter	death
46	Milton Shadur	1924–2018	1980–1992	—	1992–2018	Carter	death
48	Susan Getzendanner	1939–present	1980–1987	—	—	Carter	resignation
49	John Albert Nordberg	1926–2021	1982–1994	—	1994–2021	Reagan	death
50	William Thomas Hart	1929–2023	1982–1996	—	1996–2023	Reagan	death
51	Paul Edward Plunkett	1935–2018	1982–1998	—	1998–2018	Reagan	death
52	Ilana Rovner	1938–present	1984–1992	—	—	Reagan	elevation
54	James F. Holderman	1946–present	1985–2013	2006–2013	2013–2015	Reagan	retirement
55	Ann Claire Williams	1949–present	1985–1999	—	—	Reagan	elevation
56	Brian Barnett Duff	1930–2016	1985–1996	—	1996–2016	Reagan	death
57	Harry Leinenweber	1937–2024	1985–2002	—	2002–2024	Reagan	death
58	James Zagel	1941–2023	1987–2016	—	2016–2023	Reagan	death
59	James Henry Alesia	1934–2003	1987–1998	—	1998–2003	Reagan	death
62	George W. Lindberg	1932–2019	1989–2001	—	2001–2019	G.H.W. Bush	death
63	Wayne Andersen	1945–present	1991–2010	—	—	G.H.W. Bush	retirement
65	Rubén Castillo	1954–present	1994–2019	2013–2019	—	Clinton	retirement
66	Blanche M. Manning	1934–2020	1994–2010	—	2010–2020	Clinton	death
67	David H. Coar	1943–present	1994–2009	—	2009–2010	Clinton	retirement
72	William J. Hibbler	1946–2012	1999–2012	—	—	Clinton	death
76	John W. Darrah	1938–2017	2000–2017	—	2017	Clinton	death
77	Amy St. Eve	1965–present	2002–2018	—	—	G.W. Bush	elevation
78	Samuel Der-Yeghiayan	1952–present	2003–2018	—	—	G.W. Bush	retirement
79	Mark Filip	1966–present	2004–2008	—	—	G.W. Bush	resignation
83	Gary Feinerman	1965–present	2010–2022	—	—	Obama	resignation
86	John Z. Lee	1968–present	2012–2022	—	—	Obama	elevation
100	Nancy L. Maldonado	1975–present	2022–2024	—	—	Biden	elevation

== Chief judges ==
Chief judges have administrative responsibilities with respect to their district court. Unlike the Supreme Court, where one justice is specifically nominated to be chief, the office of chief judge rotates among the district court judges. To be chief, a judge must have been in active service on the court for at least one year, be under the age of 65, and have not previously served as chief judge.

A vacancy is filled by the judge highest in seniority among the group of qualified judges. The chief judge serves for a term of seven years, or until age 70, whichever occurs first. The age restrictions are waived if no members of the court would otherwise be qualified for the position.

When the office was created in 1948, the chief judge was the longest-serving judge who had not elected to retire, on what has since 1958 been known as senior status, or declined to serve as chief judge. After August 6, 1959, judges could not become or remain chief after turning 70 years old. The current rules have been in operation since October 1, 1982.

== Succession of seats ==
Seat 1
Seat reassigned from the District of Illinois on February 13, 1855 by 10 Stat. 606
Drummond	1855–1869
Blodgett	1870–1892
Grosscup	1892–1899
Kohlsaat	1899–1905
Bethea	1905–1909
Carpenter	1910–1933
Holly	1934–1943
LaBuy	1944–1961
Austin	1961–1975
Crowley	1976–1981
Hart	1982–1996
Pallmeyer	1998–2024
Alexakis	2024–present

Seat 2
Seat established on March 3, 1905 by 33 Stat. 992
Landis	1905–1922
Wilkerson	1922–1940
Seat abolished on December 31, 1940 (temporary judgeship expired)

Seat 3
Seat established on September 14, 1922 by 42 Stat. 837 (temporary)
Cliffe	1922–1928
Seat made permanent on May 29, 1928 by 45 Stat. 974
Woodward	1929–1942
Shaw	1944–1950
J. Perry	1951–1971
Bauer	1971–1974
Kirkland, Sr.	1974–1979
Kocoras	1980–2006
Dow, Jr.	2007–present

Seat 4
Seat established on February 25, 1931 by 46 Stat. 1417
Barnes	1931–1957
Miner	1958–1963
Marovitz	1963–1975
Leighton	1976–1987
Alesia	1987–1998
Hibbler	1999–2012
Wood	2013–present

Seat 5
Seat established on February 25, 1931 by 46 Stat. 1417
Johnson	1932–1933
Sullivan	1934–1960
Parsons	1961–1981
Plunkett	1982–1998
Kennelly	1999–2021
Maldonado	2022–2024
A. Perry	2024–present

Seat 6
Seat established on May 31, 1938 by 52 Stat. 584
Igoe	1938–1965
Lynch	1966–1976
Bua	1977–1991
Castillo	1994–2019
Valderrama	2020–present

Seat 7
Seat established on May 24, 1940 by 54 Stat. 219 (temporary)
Seat became permanent upon the abolition of Seat 2 on December 31, 1940
Campbell	1940–1970
McMillen	1971–1984
Conlon	1988–2004
Kendall	2006–present

Seat 8
Seat established on August 14, 1950 by 64 Stat. 443
Hoffman	1953–1972
McLaren	1972–1976
Roszkowski	1977–1991
Andersen	1991–2010
Durkin	2012–2023
Harjani	2024–present

Seat 9
Seat established on August 14, 1950 by 64 Stat. 443
Knoch	1953–1958
Robson	1959–1975
Grady	1975–1994
Gettleman	1994–2009
Feinerman	2010–2022
Daniel	2023–present

Seat 10
Seat established on May 19, 1961 by 75 Stat. 80
Will	1961–1979
Shadur	1980–1992
Manning	1994–2010
Tharp, Jr.	2012–2026
vacant	2026–present

Seat 11
Seat established on May 19, 1961 by 75 Stat. 80
Decker	1963–1980
Nordberg	1982–1994
Bucklo	1994–2009
Chang	2010–present

Seat 12
Seat established on March 18, 1966 by 80 Stat. 75
Napoli	1966–1972
Marshall	1973–1988
Lindberg	1989–2001
St. Eve	2002–2018
Rowland	2019–present

Seat 13
Seat established on June 2, 1970 by 84 Stat. 294
McGarr	1970–1986
Zagel	1987–2016
Seeger	2019–present

Seat 14
Seat established on June 2, 1970 by 84 Stat. 294
Tone	1972–1974
Flaum	1974–1983
Rovner	1984–1992
Coar	1994–2009
Lee	2012–2022
Jenkins	2023–present

Seat 15
Seat established on October 20, 1978 by 92 Stat. 1629
Moran	1979–1995
Gottschall	1996–2012
Ellis	2013–present

Seat 16
Seat established on October 20, 1978 by 92 Stat. 1629
Aspen	1979–2002
Der-Yeghiayan	2003–2018
Kness	2020–present

Seat 17
Seat established on October 20, 1978 by 92 Stat. 1629
Getzendanner	1980–1987
Marovich	1988–2000
Darrah	2000–2017
Pacold	2019–present

Seat 18
Seat established on July 10, 1984 by 98 Stat. 333
Norgle Sr.	1984–2022
Hunt	2023–present

Seat 19
Seat established on July 10, 1984 by 98 Stat. 333
Holderman	1985–2013
Blakey	2014–present

Seat 20
Seat established on July 10, 1984 by 98 Stat. 333
Williams	1985–1999
Lefkow	2000–2012
Shah	2014–present

Seat 21
Seat established on July 10, 1984 by 98 Stat. 333
Duff	1985–1996
Guzman	1999–2014
Alonso	2014–present

Seat 22
Seat established on July 10, 1984 by 98 Stat. 333 (temporary)
Seat made permanent on December 1, 1990 by 104 Stat. 5089
Leinenweber	1985–2002
Filip	2004–2008
Coleman	2010–present

Seat 23
Seat established on December 1, 1990 by 104 Stat. 5089
Reinhard	1992–2007
Kapala	2007–2019
Johnston	2020–present

Seat 24
Seat established on December 5, 2022 pursuant to 104 Stat. 5089 (temporary)
Cummings	2023–present

== List of U.S. attorneys since 1857 ==
- Augustus M. Herrington, 1857–1858
- Henry S. Fitch, 1858–1861
- Edwin C. Larned, 1861
- Joseph O. Glover, 1869
- Mark Bangs, 1875–1879
- Joseph B. Seake, 1879–1884
- Richard S. Tuthill, 1884–1886
- William G. Ewing, 1886–1890
- Thomas E. Milchrist, 1891–1893
- Sherwood Dixon, 1893–1894
- John C. Black, 1895–1899
- Solomon H. Bethea, 1899–1905
- Charles B. Morrison, 1905–1906
- Edwin W. Sims, 1906–1911
- James Herbert Wilkerson, 1911–1914
- Charles F. Clyne, 1914–1922
- Edwin A. Olson, 1922–1927
- George E. Q. Johnson, 1927–1931
- Dwight H. Green, 1931–1935
- Michael L. Igoe, 1935–1938
- William Joseph Campbell, 1938–1940
- J. Albert Woll, 1940–1947
- Otto Kerner Jr., 1947–1954
- Irwin N. Cohen, 1954
- Robert Tieken, 1954–1961
- James P. O'Brien, 1961–1963
- Frank E. McDonald, 1963–1964
- Edward Hanrahan, 1964–1968
- Tom Foran, 1968–1970
- William J. Bauer, 1970–1971
- James R. Thompson, 1971–1975
- Samuel K. Skinner, 1975–1977
- Thomas P. Sullivan, 1977–1981
- Gregory C. Jones, 1981
- Dan K. Webb, 1981–1985
- Anton R. Valukas, 1985–1989
- Ira A. Raphaelson, 1989–1990
- Fred Foreman, 1990–1993
- Michael J. Shepard, 1993
- Jim Burns, 1993–1997
- Scott R. Lassar, 1997–2001
- Patrick Fitzgerald, 2001–2012
- Gary S. Shapiro, 2012–2013
- Zachary T. Fardon, 2013–2017
- Joel R. Levin, 2017
- John R. Lausch Jr., 2017–2023
- Morris Pasqual, 2023–2025
- Andrew S. Boutros, 2025-

== See also ==
- Courts of Illinois
- List of current United States district judges
- List of United States federal courthouses in Illinois
