= Susan Christine O'Meara Getzendanner =

American judge (born 1939)

Susan Christine Getzendanner

Judge of the United States District Court for the Northern District of Illinois
- In office September 30, 1980 – September 30, 1987
- Appointed by: Jimmy Carter
- Preceded by: Seat established by 92 Stat. 1629
- Succeeded by: George M. Marovich

Personal details
- Born: July 24, 1939 (age 86) Chicago, Illinois, U.S.
- Education: Loyola University of Chicago (BBA); Loyola University Chicago School of Law (JD)

Susan Christine O'Meara Getzendanner (born July 24, 1939) is a former United States district judge of the United States District Court for the Northern District of Illinois, and in 2013 was listed as a NAFTA adjudicator.

== Education and career ==
Getzendanner was born in Chicago, Illinois. She received a Bachelor of Business Administration from Loyola University Chicago in 1966 and a Juris Doctor from Loyola University Chicago School of Law in 1966. She was a law clerk for Judge Julius Hoffman of the United States District Court for the Northern District of Illinois from 1966 to 1968. Thereafter, she entered private practice in Chicago.

== Federal judicial service ==
Getzendanner was nominated by President Jimmy Carter on June 4, 1980, to a new seat on the United States District Court for the Northern District of Illinois created by 92 Stat. 1629. She was confirmed on September 29, 1980, and received her commission on September 30, 1980. On September 30, 1987, she resigned and re-entered private practice.

== Notable case ==
She was the presiding judge in the second trial of Wilk v. American Medical Association (May/June 1987).

== Sources ==
Legal offices
Preceded by Seat established by 92 Stat. 1629	Judge of the United States District Court for the Northern District of Illinois; 1980–1987	Succeeded by George M. Marovich
