= George Albert Carpenter =

American judge

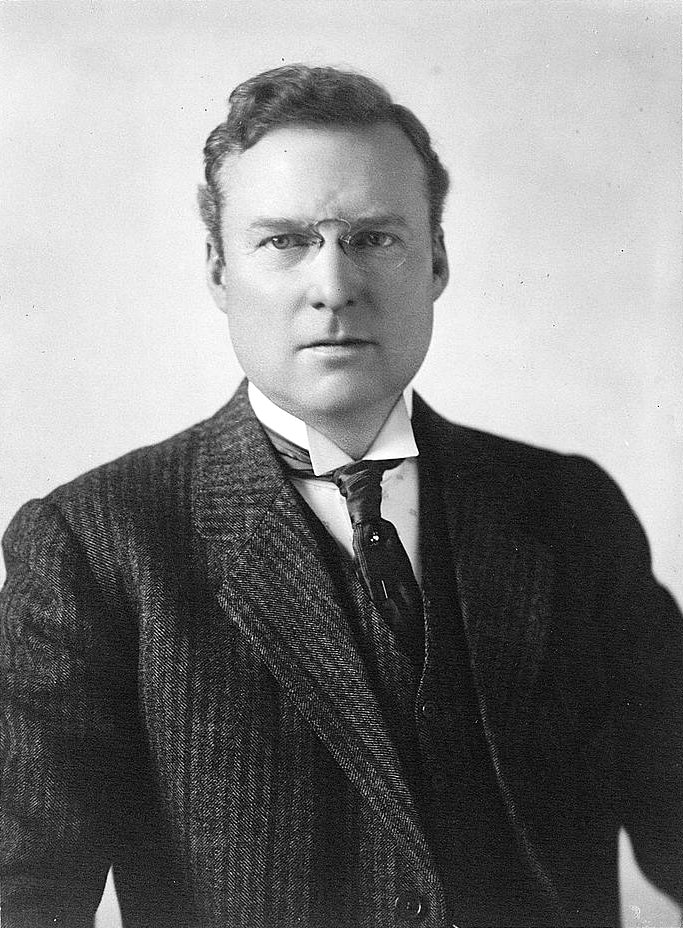

Judge of the United States District Court for the Northern District of Illinois
- In office January 11, 1910 – June 30, 1933
- Appointed by: William Howard Taft
- Preceded by: Solomon H. Bethea
- Succeeded by: William Harrison Holly

Personal details
- Born: George Albert Carpenter; October 2, 1867 Chicago, Illinois
- Died: September 13, 1944 (aged 76) Chicago, Illinois
- Education: Harvard University (B.A.); Harvard Law School (LL.B.)

George Albert Carpenter (October 2, 1867 – September 13, 1944) was a United States district judge of the United States District Court for the Northern District of Illinois.

== Education and career ==
Born in Chicago, Illinois, Carpenter received a Bachelor of Arts degree from Harvard University in 1888 and a Bachelor of Laws from Harvard Law School in 1891. He was in private practice in Chicago from 1891 to 1905. In 1906, he became a Judge of the Circuit Court of Cook County, Illinois, serving until 1910.

== Federal judicial service ==
Carpenter was nominated by President William Howard Taft on December 13, 1909, to a seat on the United States District Court for the Northern District of Illinois vacated by Judge Solomon H. Bethea. He was confirmed by the United States Senate on January 11, 1910, and received his commission the same day. His service terminated on June 30, 1933, due to his resignation.

=== Notable case ===
Carpenter presided over the trial of Jack Johnson under the Mann Act and passed sentence.

== Later career and death ==
Following his resignation from the federal bench, Carpenter returned to private practice in Chicago from 1933 to 1944. He died on September 13, 1944, Chicago.

== Sources ==
Legal offices
Preceded by Solomon H. Bethea	Judge of the United States District Court for the Northern District of Illinois; 1910–1933	Succeeded by William Harrison Holly
