= Frederick J. Kapala =

American judge (born 1950)

Senior Judge of the United States District Court for the Northern District of Illinois
- Incumbent
- Assumed office May 10, 2019

Judge of the United States District Court for the Northern District of Illinois
- In office May 10, 2007 – May 10, 2019
- Appointed by: George W. Bush
- Preceded by: Philip Godfrey Reinhard
- Succeeded by: Iain D. Johnston

Personal details
- Born: 1950 (age 75–76) Rockford, Illinois, U.S.
- Education: Marquette University (BA); University of Illinois Urbana-Champaign (JD)

Frederick J. Kapala (born 1950) is an inactive senior United States district judge of the United States District Court for the Northern District of Illinois.

== Education and career ==
Kapala was born in Rockford, Illinois. He was a captain in the United States Army Reserve from 1970 to 1980. He received a Bachelor of Arts degree from Marquette University in 1972 and a Juris Doctor from the University of Illinois College of Law in 1976. He was an assistant state's attorney of Winnebago County, Illinois, from 1976 to 1977, and was in private practice in Rockford from 1977 to 1982. He was an associate judge of the state of Illinois from 1982 to 1994, then a circuit judge until 2001, and then an appellate judge until 2007.

=== Federal judicial service ===
On January 9, 2007, Kapala was nominated by President George W. Bush to a seat on the United States District Court for the Northern District of Illinois vacated by Philip Godfrey Reinhard. Kapala was confirmed by the United States Senate on May 8, 2007, and received his commission on May 10, 2007. He assumed senior status on May 10, 2019.

== Sources ==
Legal offices
Preceded by Philip Godfrey Reinhard	Judge of the United States District Court for the Northern District of Illinois; 2007–2019	Succeeded by Iain D. Johnston
