= Jorge L. Alonso =

Cuban-American judge (born 1966)

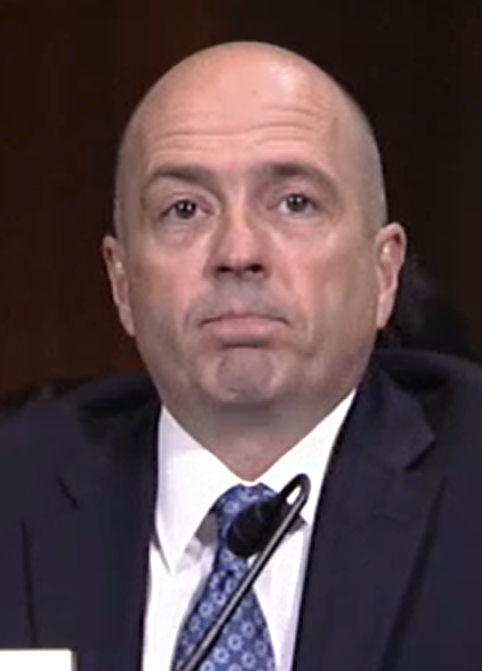

Judge of the United States District Court for the Northern District of Illinois
- Incumbent
- Assumed office December 19, 2014
- Appointed by: Barack Obama
- Preceded by: Ronald A. Guzman

Associate Judge of the Circuit Court of Cook County
- In office 2003–2014

Personal details
- Born: Jorge Luis Alonso; April 1966 (age 59–60) Sagua La Grande, Cuba
- Education: University of Miami (BA); George Washington University (JD)

Jorge Luis Alonso (born April 1966) is a United States district judge of the United States District Court for the Northern District of Illinois and former Illinois state judge.

== Early life and education ==
Alonso was born in 1966 in Sagua La Grande, Las Villas, Cuba. He went to Loyola High School in Miami, Florida. He received a Bachelor of Arts degree in 1988 from the University of Miami. He received a Juris Doctor in 1991 from the George Washington University Law School.

== Career ==
He served as an assistant public defender in the Office of the Cook County Public Defender from 1991 to 2003, where he represented indigent individuals in both civil and criminal proceedings. From 2003 to 2014, he served as an associate judge on Cook County Circuit Court, a state trial court of general jurisdiction based in Chicago.

On August 5, 2014, President Barack Obama nominated Alonso to serve as a United States district judge of the United States District Court for the Northern District of Illinois, to the seat vacated by Judge Ronald A. Guzman, who subsequently assumed senior status on November 16, 2014. He received a hearing before the United States Senate Committee on the Judiciary for September 9, 2014. On November 20, 2014 his nomination was reported out of committee by voice vote. On December 13, 2014 Senate Majority Leader Harry Reid filed a motion to invoke cloture on the nomination. On December 16, 2014, Reid withdrew his cloture motion on Alonso's nomination, and the United States Senate confirmed Alonso by voice vote. He received his judicial commission on December 19, 2014.

== See also ==
- List of Hispanic and Latino American jurists

Legal offices
Preceded by Ronald A. Guzman	Judge of the United States District Court for the Northern District of Illinois; 2014–present	Incumbent
