= Solomon H. Bethea =

American lawyer (1852–1909)

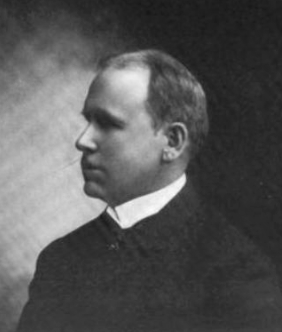

Judge of the United States District Court for the Northern District of Illinois
- In office March 18, 1905 – August 3, 1909
- Appointed by: Theodore Roosevelt
- Preceded by: Christian Cecil Kohlsaat
- Succeeded by: George Albert Carpenter

United States Attorney for the Northern District of Illinois
- In office 1899–1905
- President: William McKinley; Theodore Roosevelt
- Preceded by: John C. Black
- Succeeded by: Charles B. Morrison

Member of the Illinois House of Representatives
- In office 1882–1883

Personal details
- Born: Solomon Hicks Bethea; May 18, 1852 Lee County, Illinois, U.S.
- Died: August 3, 1909 (aged 57) Sterling, Illinois, U.S.
- Occupation: Jurist

Solomon Hicks Bethea (May 18, 1852 – August 3, 1909) was an American attorney, politician and judge. He was appointed United States district judge for the Northern District of Illinois by Theodore Roosevelt. He also served as United States Attorney for the same district, was a member of the Illinois House of Representatives for one term, and was Mayor of Dixon, Illinois.

== Career ==
Born in Lee County, Illinois, Bethea read law in 1876.

He was in private practice in Dixon, Illinois, from 1877 to 1898. He was a member of the Illinois House of Representatives from 1882 to 1883 and Mayor of Dixon. He was the United States Attorney for the Northern District of Illinois from 1899 to 1905.

Bethea was nominated by President Theodore Roosevelt on March 18, 1905, to a seat on the United States District Court for the Northern District of Illinois vacated by Judge Christian Cecil Kohlsaat. He was confirmed by the United States Senate on March 18, 1905, and received his commission the same day.

== Death ==
Bethea died on August 3, 1909.

== Sources ==
Legal offices
Preceded by John C. Black	United States Attorney for the Northern District of Illinois; 1899–1905	Succeeded by Charles B. Morrison
Preceded by Christian Cecil Kohlsaat	United States district judge for the Northern District of Illinois; 1905–1909	Succeeded by George Albert Carpenter
