= Wilk v. American Medical Association =

1990 federal antitrust suit

- Court: United States Court of Appeals for the Seventh Circuit
- Full case name: Dr. Chester A. Wilk, D.C., et al v. American Medical Association, et al
- Argued: December 1, 1988
- Decided: February 7, 1990
- Citation: 895 F.2d 352 (7th Cir. 1990)

Case history
- Prior history: 635 F.2d 1295 (7th Cir. 1981); 719 F.2d 207 (7th Cir. 1983); 671 F. Supp. 1465 (N.D. Ill. 1987)
- Subsequent history: Rehearing en banc denied, April 25, 1990

Court membership
- Judges sitting: Harlington Wood Jr., Kenneth Francis Ripple, Daniel Anthony Manion

Case opinions
- Majority: Manion, joined by Wood, Ripple

Laws applied
- Sherman Antitrust Act

Wilk v. American Medical Association, 895 F.2d 352 (7th Cir. 1990), was a federal antitrust suit brought against the American Medical Association (AMA) and 10 co-defendants by chiropractor Chester A. Wilk, DC, and four co-plaintiffs. It resulted in a ruling against the AMA.

== Case history ==
=== Pre-trial environment ===
Until 1983, the AMA held that it was unethical for medical doctors to associate with an "unscientific practitioner", and labeled chiropractic "an unscientific cult".

Before 1980, Principle 3 of the AMA Principles of medical ethics stated: "A physician should practice a method of healing founded on a scientific basis; and he should not voluntarily professionally associate with anyone who violates this principle." In 1980 during a major revision of ethical rules (while the Wilk litigation was in progress), it replaced Principle 3, stating that a physician "shall be free to choose whom to serve, with whom to associate, and the environment in which to provide medical services". Also, up until 1974, the AMA had a Committee on so-called "quackery", a term used to challenge what it considered to be unscientific forms of healing. Wilk argued that this committee was established specifically to undermine chiropractic.

=== The first trial ===
In 1976, Chester Wilk and four other chiropractors sued the AMA, several nationwide healthcare associations, and several physicians for violations of sections 1 and 2 of the Sherman Antitrust Act. The plaintiffs lost at the first trial in 1981, then obtained a new trial on appeal in 1983 because of improper jury instructions and admission of irrelevant and prejudicial evidence (Wilk v. American Medical Association, 735 F.2d 217, 7th Cir. 1983).

=== The second trial ===
In the second trial case the AMA had the burden of proof, needing to establish the validity of the boycott. The court recognized a "patient care defense", but imposed a difficult burden. The defendants had to show their concern could not have been adequately satisfied in a manner less restrictive of competition. So Wilk and later cases greatly limit the use of "quality of care" defense in boycott cases.

Just before the second trial, the plaintiffs dropped their demand for damages and sought only an injunction. Therefore, the resulting trial in May and June 1987 was a bench trial in which Judge Susan Getzendanner personally heard the evidence and made factual findings.

=== Judge's findings in the second trial ===
On September 25, 1987, Getzendanner issued her opinion that the AMA had violated Section 1, but not 2, of the Sherman Act, and that it had engaged in an unlawful conspiracy in restraint of trade "to contain and eliminate the chiropractic profession". (Wilk v. American Medical Association, 671 F. Supp. 1465, N.D. Ill. 1987). She further stated that the "AMA had entered into a long history of illegal behavior". She then issued a permanent injunction against the AMA under Section 16 of the Clayton Act to prevent such future behavior. However, she exonerated the two other remaining defendants, the Joint Commission on Accreditation of Hospitals and the American College of Physicians, and dismissed them from the case.

Judge Getzendanner also went out of her way to make clear what she was not doing:

The plaintiffs clearly want more from the court. They want a judicial pronouncement that chiropractic is a valid, efficacious, even scientific health care service. I believe that the answer to that question can only be provided by a well designed, controlled, scientific study ... No such study has ever been done. In the absence of such a study, the court is left to decide the issue on the basis of largely anecdotal evidence. I decline to pronounce chiropractic valid or invalid on anecdotal evidence.

However, Judge Getzendanner went on:

The plaintiffs, however, point out that the anecdotal evidence in the record favors chiropractors. The patients who testified were helped by chiropractors and not by medical physicians. Per Freitag, a medical physician who associates with chiropractors, has observed that patients in one hospital who receive chiropractic treatment are released sooner than patients in another hospital in which he is on staff which does not allow chiropractors. John McMillan Mennell testified in favor of chiropractic. Even the defendants' economic witness, Mr. Lynk, assumed that chiropractors outperformed medical physicians in the treatment of certain conditions and he believed that was a reasonable assumption.

The defendants have offered some evidence as to the unscientific nature of chiropractic. The study of how the five original named plaintiffs diagnosed and actually treated patients with common symptoms was particularly impressive. This study demonstrated that the plaintiffs do not use common methods in treating common symptoms and that the treatment of patients appears to be undertaken on an ad hoc rather than on a scientific basis. And there was evidence of the use of cranial adjustments to cure cerebral palsy and other equally alarming practices by some chiropractors.

I do not minimize the negative evidence. But most of the defense witnesses, surprisingly, appeared to be testifying for the plaintiffs. Taking into account all of the evidence, I conclude only that the AMA has failed to meet its burden on the issue of whether its concern for the scientific method in support of the boycott of the entire chiropractic profession was objectively reasonable throughout the entire period of the boycott. This finding is not and should not be construed as a judicial endorsement of chiropractic.

The next element of the patient care defense is whether the AMA's concern about scientific method has been the dominant motivating factor in the defendants' promulgation of Principle 3 in the conduct undertaken and intended to implement Principle 3. The AMA has carried its burden on this issue. While there is some evidence that the Committee on Quackery and the AMA were motivated by economic concerns – there are too many references in the record to chiropractors as competitors to ignore – I am persuaded that the dominant factor was patient care and the AMA's subjective belief that chiropractic was not in the best interests of patients.

She concluded that the AMA had been too restrictive in its campaign:

The final question is whether this concern for scientific method in patient care could have been adequately satisfied in a manner less restrictive of competition. It would be a difficult task to persuade a court that a boycott and conspiracy designed to contain and eliminate a profession that was licensed in all fifty states at the time the Committee on Quackery disbanded was the only way to satisfy the AMA's concern for the use of scientific method in patient care. The AMA presented no evidence that a public education approach or any other less restrictive approach was beyond the ability or resources of the AMA or had been tried and failed. The AMA obviously was not successful in defeating the licensing of chiropractic on a state by state basis, but that failure does not mean that they had to resort to the highly restrictive means of the boycott. The AMA and other medical societies have managed to change America's health-related conduct by what appears to be good public relations work and there has been no proof that a similar campaign would not have been at least as effective as the boycott in educating consumers about chiropractic and the AMA's concern for scientific method. Based on these findings, I conclude that the AMA has failed to carry its burden of persuasion on the patient care defense.

== Following the second trial ==
Both sides cross-appealed. On February 7, 1990, the Seventh Circuit Court of Appeals held in favor of the plaintiffs on their claims against the American Medical Association, but held in favor of the defendants in the plaintiffs' case against the Joint Commission on Accreditation of Healthcare Organizations (JCAHO) and the American College of Physicians (ACP). (Wilk v. American Medical Association, 895 F.2d 352, 7th Cir. 1990). The plaintiffs petitioned the U.S. Supreme Court to review their case against JCAHO and ACP. On June 11, 1990, the Supreme Court denied certiorari. The plaintiffs then petitioned the Supreme Court for rehearing; the Supreme Court denied rehearing on August 13, 1990. The American Medical Association also petitioned the Supreme Court for certiorari; the Supreme Court denied certiorari on November 26, 1990.

The AMA eliminated Principle 3 in 1980 during a major revision of ethical rules (while the Wilk litigation was in progress). Its replacement stated that a physician "shall be free to choose whom to serve, with whom to associate, and the environment in which to provide medical services". Thus, the AMA now permits medical doctors to refer patients to doctors of chiropractic for such manipulative therapy if the medical doctor believes it is in the best interests of the patients.
