= James Byron Moran =

American judge

Senior Judge of the United States District Court for the Northern District of Illinois
- In office June 30, 1995 – April 21, 2009

Chief Judge of the United States District Court for the Northern District of Illinois
- In office 1990–1995
- Preceded by: John Francis Grady
- Succeeded by: Marvin Aspen

Judge of the United States District Court for the Northern District of Illinois
- In office July 24, 1979 – June 30, 1995
- Appointed by: Jimmy Carter
- Preceded by: Seat established by 92 Stat. 1629
- Succeeded by: Joan B. Gottschall

Personal details
- Born: James Byron Moran; June 20, 1930 Evanston, Illinois
- Died: April 21, 2009 (aged 78) Evanston, Illinois
- Education: University of Michigan (BA); Harvard Law School (LLB)

James Byron Moran (June 20, 1930 – April 21, 2009) was a United States district judge of the United States District Court for the Northern District of Illinois.

== Education and career ==
Moran was born in Evanston, Illinois, on June 20, 1930. Moran received a Bachelor of Arts degree from the University of Michigan in 1952. He was a sergeant in the United States Army from 1952 to 1954. After the war, he went law school, receiving a Bachelor of Laws from Harvard Law School in 1957. He was a law clerk for Judge J. Edward Lumbard of the United States Court of Appeals for the Second Circuit from 1957 to 1958. He entered private practice in Chicago, Illinois, in 1958, continuing until his appointment to the federal bench in 1979. He served in the Illinois House of Representatives from 1965 to 1967 and as a member of the Evanston City Council from 1971 to 1975.

== Federal judicial service ==
Moran was nominated by President Jimmy Carter on May 22, 1979, to a new seat on the United States District Court for the Northern District of Illinois created by 92 Stat. 1629. He was confirmed by the United States Senate on July 23, 1979, and received his commission on July 24, 1979. He served as Chief Judge from 1990 to 1995 and assumed senior status on June 30, 1995. He remained a senior judge until his death of esophageal cancer on April 21, 2009, at his home in Evanston.

== Sources ==
- Jensen, Trevor (April 9, 2009). "James B. Moran, 1930-2009: U.S. district judge". Chicago Tribune.

Legal offices
Preceded by Seat established by 92 Stat. 1629	Judge of the United States District Court for the Northern District of Illinois; 1979–1995	Succeeded by Joan B. Gottschall
Preceded by John Francis Grady	Chief Judge of the United States District Court for the Northern District of Illinois; 1990–1995	Succeeded by Marvin Aspen
