= Franklin U. Valderrama =

American judge (born 1962)

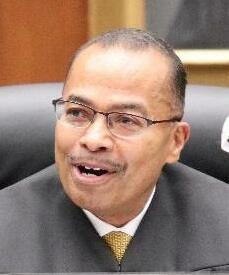
- Valderrama in 2022

Judge of the United States District Court for the Northern District of Illinois
- Incumbent
- Assumed office September 23, 2020
- Appointed by: Donald Trump
- Preceded by: Rubén Castillo

Associate Judge of the Circuit Court of Cook County
- In office 2007 – September 23, 2020

Personal details
- Born: Franklin Ulyses Valderrama; 1962 (age 63–64) Panama City, Panama
- Education: University of Illinois at Chicago (BA); DePaul University (JD)

Franklin Ulyses Valderrama (born 1962) is a United States district judge of the United States District Court for the Northern District of Illinois.

== Education ==
Valderrama earned a Bachelor of Arts from the University of Illinois at Chicago in 1985 and a Juris Doctor from the DePaul University College of Law in 1988.

== Career ==
Valderrama began his career in 1988 as a staff attorney for the United States Bankruptcy Court for Northern Illinois, where he worked for a year. In 1989, he joined the Law Office of Tom Leahy, where he was an associate. In 1992, he joined the Chicago office of Landau, Omahana & Kopka, where he was an associate. Starting in 1993, he then worked at Sanchez, Daniels & Hoffman in Chicago, where his practice focused on trial litigation. He left the firm as a partner when he became a judge. He has also served as an adjunct professor at UIC John Marshall Law School, where he taught pre-trial civil litigation.

=== State judicial service ===
From 2007 to 2020, Valderrama served as an associate judge of the Cook County Circuit Court. His state court service terminated when he became a federal district judge.

=== Federal judicial service ===
On February 5, 2020, President Donald Trump announced his intent to nominate Valderrama to serve as a United States district judge of the United States District Court for the Northern District of Illinois as part of a bipartisan package of nominees which included David W. Dugan. On February 12, 2020, his nomination was sent to the Senate. President Trump nominated Valderrama to the seat vacated by Judge Rubén Castillo, who retired on September 27, 2019. A hearing on his nomination before the Senate Judiciary Committee was held on June 24, 2020. On July 30, 2020, his nomination was reported out of committee by a 16–6 vote. On September 17, 2020, the United States Senate confirmed his nomination by a 68–26 vote, with a majority of Republicans opposed and all Democrats in favor. He received his judicial commission on September 23, 2020. He was sworn in on September 28, 2020.

== See also ==
- List of African-American federal judges
- List of African-American jurists
- List of Hispanic and Latino American jurists

Legal offices
| Preceded by Rubén Castillo | Judge of the United States District Court for the Northern District of Illinois; 2020–present | Incumbent |
