= Blanche M. Manning =

American judge (1934–2020)

Senior Judge of the United States District Court for the Northern District of Illinois
- In office February 1, 2010 – September 20, 2020

Judge of the United States District Court for the Northern District of Illinois
- In office August 10, 1994 – February 1, 2010
- Appointed by: Bill Clinton
- Preceded by: Milton Shadur
- Succeeded by: John Tharp

Personal details
- Born: Blanche Marie Porter; December 12, 1934 Chicago, Illinois, U.S.
- Died: September 20, 2020 (aged 85)
- Education: Chicago State University (BEd); John Marshall Law School (JD); Roosevelt University (MA); University of Virginia School of Law (LLM)

Blanche Marie Manning (née Porter; December 12, 1934 – September 20, 2020) was a United States district judge of the United States District Court for the Northern District of Illinois.

== Early life and education ==
Manning was born on December 12, 1934, in Chicago. She received a Bachelor of Education from Chicago Teachers College in 1961, a Juris Doctor from John Marshall Law School in 1967, a Master of Arts from Roosevelt University in 1972, and a Master of Laws from the University of Virginia School of Law in 1992.

== Legal career ==
From 1968 to 1973, Manning served as an assistant attorney in the Cook County, Illinois State Attorney's Office. From 1973 to 1977, Manning worked as a supervisory trial attorney for the Equal Employment Opportunity Commission in Chicago. She was also a lecturer at Malcolm X College from 1970 to 1971.

In 1977, Manning began work as a corporate litigation attorney for Chicago-based United Airlines. A year later, Manning transitioned to the role of assistant United States attorney for the Northern District of Illinois, a role she held from 1978 to 1979. During that same time, Manning was an adjunct professor at the National Conference of Black Lawyers Community College of Law. In 1979, she started her judicial career as an associate circuit court judge in Cook County, where she served until 1986.

Manning was a lead circuit judge in the Illinois Cook Judicial Circuit Court from 1986 to 1987. In 1987 she was elected as a justice in the Illinois First District Appellate Court of the Illinois Appellate Court, becoming the first African-American female member of the court. From 1992 to 1994, Manning also worked as an adjunct professor at the DePaul University College of Law.

=== Federal judicial service ===
On May 5, 1994, President Bill Clinton nominated Manning to serve as a United States district judge of the United States District Court for the Northern District of Illinois to a seat vacated by Milton Shadur, who assumed senior status on June 25, 1992. Manning was confirmed by the Senate on August 9, 1994, and received her commission on August 10, 1994. On February 1, 2010, Manning assumed senior status. She died on September 20, 2020, aged 85.

=== Notable ruling ===
Manning is known for sentencing Mark Whitacre, a whistleblower in the Archer Daniels Midland lysine pricefixing case. Mark Whitacre's sentence was harsher than that of his superiors at the ADM company and has been often spotlighted for deterring future whistleblowers.

== See also ==
- List of African-American federal judges
- List of African-American jurists

Legal offices
Preceded by Milton I. Shadur	Judge of the United States District Court for the Northern District of Illinois; 1994–2010	Succeeded by John J. Tharp, Jr.
