= Walter J. LaBuy =

American judge

Senior Judge of the United States District Court for the Northern District of Illinois
- In office January 31, 1961 – September 29, 1967

Judge of the United States District Court for the Northern District of Illinois
- In office March 31, 1944 – January 31, 1961
- Appointed by: Franklin D. Roosevelt
- Preceded by: William Harrison Holly
- Succeeded by: Richard B. Austin

Judge of the Circuit Court of Cook County
- In office 1933–1944

Member of the Cook County Board of Commissioners
- In office 1930–1933

Personal details
- Born: July 25, 1888 Dodge County, Wisconsin
- Died: September 29, 1967 (aged 79) Chicago, Illinois
- Education: DePaul University College of Law (LL.B.)

Walter Jacob LaBuy (July 25, 1888 – September 29, 1967) was a United States district judge of the United States District Court for the Northern District of Illinois.

== Education and career ==
Born in Dodge County, Wisconsin, LaBuy received a Bachelor of Laws from DePaul University College of Law in 1912. He was in private practice in Chicago, Illinois from 1912 to 1933. From 1930 to 1933, he was a member of the Cook County Board of Commissioners. He served as a Judge of the Circuit Court of Cook County from 1933 to 1944.

== Federal judicial service ==
LaBuy was nominated by President Franklin D. Roosevelt on March 7, 1944, to a seat on the United States District Court for the Northern District of Illinois vacated by Judge William Harrison Holly. He was confirmed by the United States Senate on March 29, 1944, and received his commission on March 31, 1944. He assumed senior status on January 31, 1961, serving until his death in Chicago on September 29, 1967.

=== Notable case ===
LaBuy presided over the well-known trial of automaker Preston Tucker.

== Sources ==
Legal offices
Preceded by William Harrison Holly	Judge of the United States District Court for the Northern District of Illinois; 1944–1961	Succeeded by Richard B. Austin
