= Georgia N. Alexakis =

American judge (born 1978)

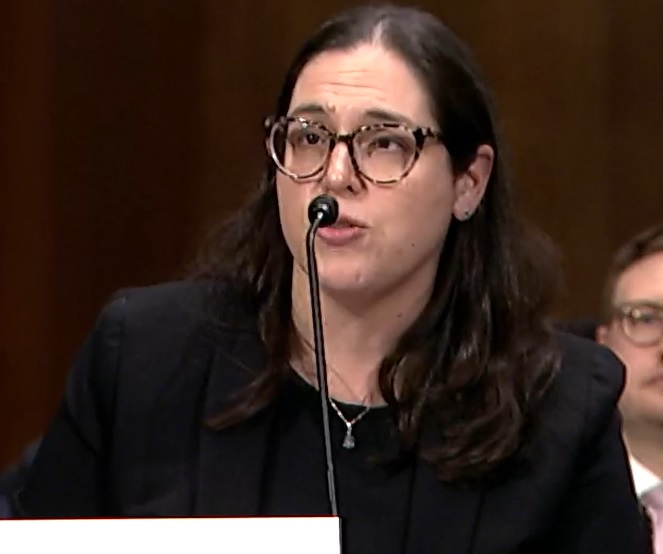

Judge of the United States District Court for the Northern District of Illinois
- Incumbent
- Assumed office August 2, 2024
- Appointed by: Joe Biden
- Preceded by: Rebecca R. Pallmeyer

Personal details
- Born: Georgia Nick Alexakis; 1978 (age 47–48) Chicago, Illinois, U.S.
- Education: Harvard University (AB); Northwestern University (JD)

Georgia Nick Alexakis (born 1978) is an American lawyer who is serving as a United States district judge of the United States District Court for the Northern District of Illinois.

== Education ==
Alexakis earned a Bachelor of Arts, magna cum laude, from Harvard University in 2000 and a Juris Doctor, magna cum laude, from the Northwestern University Pritzker School of Law in 2006. While at Harvard, Alexakis was managing editor of The Harvard Crimson.

== Career ==
Between 2000 and 2003, Alexakis worked at the Boston Consulting Group in Chicago, first as an associate and later as a consultant. From 2006 to 2007, she served as a law clerk for Judge Marsha Berzon of the United States Court of Appeals for the Ninth Circuit. The following year, she clerked for Judge Milton Shadur of the United States District Court for the Northern District of Illinois. From 2008 to 2012, Alexakis was an associate and then a partner at Bartlit Beck Herman Palenchar & Scott LLP in Chicago. She worked as an assistant United States attorney in the Northern District of Illinois from 2013 to 2021, and again in the criminal division of that office from 2022 to 2024. Between 2021 and 2022, she was a partner at Riley Safer Holmes & Cancila LLP, focusing on government enforcement, investigations, and white-collar criminal defense.

=== Federal judicial service ===
On February 21, 2024, President Joe Biden announced his intent to nominate Alexakis to serve as a United States district judge of the United States District Court for the Northern District of Illinois. Her nomination received the support of Senators Dick Durbin and Tammy Duckworth. On February 27, 2024, her nomination was sent to the Senate. President Biden nominated Alexakis to the seat being vacated by Judge Rebecca R. Pallmeyer, who subsequently assumed senior status on August 1, 2024. On March 20, 2024, a hearing on her nomination was held before the Senate Judiciary Committee. On April 18, 2024, her nomination was reported out of committee by a 13–8 vote. On April 30, 2024, the United States Senate invoked cloture on her nomination by a 53–42 vote. On May 1, 2024, her nomination was confirmed by a 54–44 vote. She received her judicial commission on August 2, 2024. She was sworn in on August 23, 2024.

Alexakis dismissed (with prejudice) charges brought by the second Trump administration against two people including Marimar Martinez. Martinez was shot multiple times by employees of the Department of Homeland Security during Operation Midway Blitz.

Legal offices
| Preceded by Rebecca R. Pallmeyer | Judge of the United States District Court for the Northern District of Illinois; 2024–present | Incumbent |
