= Rebecca R. Pallmeyer =

American judge (born 1954)

Rebecca Pallmeyer
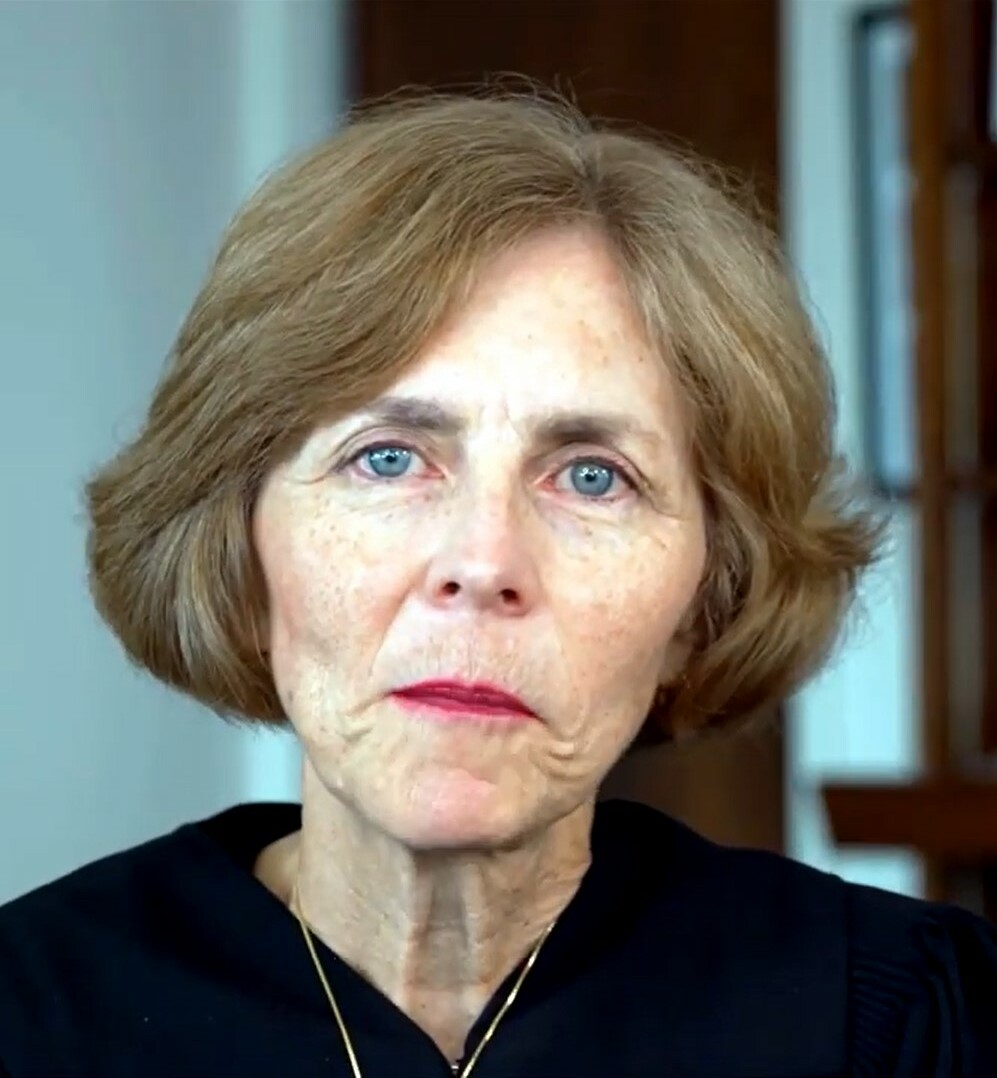
- Pallmeyer in 2020

Senior Judge of the United States District Court for the Northern District of Illinois
- Incumbent
- Assumed office August 1, 2024

Chief Judge of the United States District Court for the Northern District of Illinois
- In office July 1, 2019 – August 1, 2024
- Preceded by: Rubén Castillo
- Succeeded by: Virginia Mary Kendall

Judge of the United States District Court for the Northern District of Illinois
- In office October 22, 1998 – August 1, 2024
- Appointed by: Bill Clinton
- Preceded by: William Thomas Hart
- Succeeded by: Georgia N. Alexakis

Magistrate Judge of the United States District Court for the Northern District of Illinois
- In office 1991–1998

Personal details
- Born: Rebecca Ruth Pallmeyer; September 13, 1954 (age 71) Tokyo, Japan
- Education: Valparaiso University (BA); University of Chicago (JD)

Rebecca Ruth Pallmeyer (born September 13, 1954) is a senior United States district judge of the United States District Court for the Northern District of Illinois.

== Education and career ==
Pallmeyer was born September 13, 1954, in Tokyo, Japan. Pallmeyer received a Bachelor of Arts degree from Valparaiso University in 1976 and a J.D. degree from the University of Chicago Law School in 1979. She was a law clerk to Rosalie E. Wahl, Minnesota Supreme Court Justice, from 1979 to 1980. She was in private practice in Chicago, Illinois, from 1980 to 1985 at the law firm of Hopkins & Sutter. She was an administrative law judge on the Illinois Human Rights Commission from 1985 to 1991. She was a United States magistrate judge of the United States District Court for the Northern District of Illinois from 1991 to 1998.

=== Federal judicial service ===
Pallmeyer was nominated by President Bill Clinton on July 31, 1997, to a seat on the United States District Court for the Northern District of Illinois vacated by Judge William Thomas Hart. She was confirmed by the United States Senate on October 21, 1998, via a voice vote, and received her commission on October 22, 1998.

On July 1, 2019, she became chief judge of the Northern District of Illinois. She is the first woman to do so, in the nearly 200 years of the court's existence. She served as the chief judge from July 1, 2019 to August 1, 2024, when she assumed senior status.

== See also ==
- List of first women lawyers and judges in Illinois

Legal offices
| Preceded by William Thomas Hart | Judge of the United States District Court for the Northern District of Illinois; 1998–2024 | Succeeded by Georgia N. Alexakis |
| Preceded by Rubén Castillo | Chief Judge of the United States District Court for the Northern District of Illinois; 2019–2024 | Succeeded by Virginia Mary Kendall |
