= John Tharp =

American judge (born 1960)

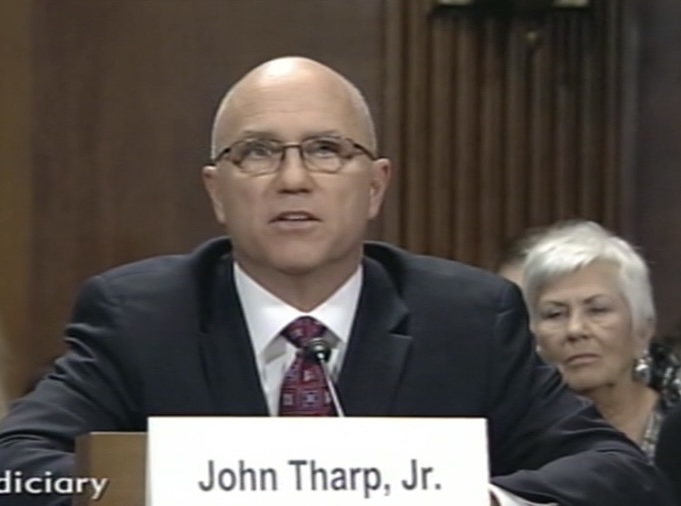
- Tharp in 2011

Senior Judge of the United States District Court for the Northern District of Illinois
- Incumbent
- Assumed office September 30, 2026

Judge of the United States Foreign Intelligence Surveillance Court
- In office May 19, 2018 – May 19, 2025
- Appointed by: John Roberts
- Preceded by: F. Dennis Saylor IV
- Succeeded by: John Robert Blakey

Judge of the United States District Court for the Northern District of Illinois
- In office May 16, 2012 – September 30, 2026
- Appointed by: Barack Obama
- Preceded by: Blanche M. Manning
- Succeeded by: vacant

Personal details
- Born: John Joseph Tharp Jr. September 18, 1960 (age 66) Camp Lejeune, North Carolina, U.S.
- Education: Duke University (BA); Northwestern University (JD)

John Joseph Tharp Jr. (born September 18, 1960) is an American lawyer who serves as a senior United States district judge of the United States District Court for the Northern District of Illinois. He also served as a judge of the United States Foreign Intelligence Surveillance Court from 2018 to 2025.

== Biography ==
John J. Tharp Jr. was born in Camp Lejeune, North Carolina. He received his Bachelor of Arts degree, summa cum laude, from Duke University in 1982. Following his graduation, he served for five years in the United States Marine Corps as a commissioned officer, attaining the rank of captain. He received his Juris Doctor, magna cum laude, from the Northwestern University School of Law in 1990. He served as a law clerk for Judge Joel Flaum of the United States Court of Appeals for the Seventh Circuit from 1990 to 1991. He worked as an associate at Kirkland & Ellis from 1991 to 1992. He served as an assistant United States attorney in the Northern District of Illinois from 1992 to 1997. From 1997 until 2012, he was an associate and then a partner at the white shoe law firm of Mayer Brown LLP. He was the co-chair of the securities litigation and enforcement practice at that firm.

=== Federal judicial service ===
On July 31, 2008, President George W. Bush nominated Tharp to replace Mark Filip on the United States District Court for the Northern District of Illinois. The nomination generated no controversy, but was made with less than six months remaining in the Bush presidency and was returned after not being acted upon by the 110th Congress.

On July 5, 2011, Senator Mark Kirk, an Illinois Republican, recommended to President Barack Obama, a Democrat, that Tharp be appointed to the United States District Court for the Northern District of Illinois. The recommendation stemmed from a long-standing tradition in Illinois that, when the state is represented in the Senate by a Democrat and a Republican, the senator from the president's party gets to recommend candidates for two in every three judicial vacancies and the other senator chooses candidates for one in three.

On November 10, 2011, President Barack Obama nominated Tharp to be a district judge on the United States District Court for the Northern District of Illinois, filling the vacancy created by Judge Blanche M. Manning, who assumed senior status in 2010. Tharp received his hearing by the Senate Judiciary Committee on January 26, 2012, and his nomination was reported to the Senate floor on February 16, 2012, by a voice vote, with Senator Mike Lee recording the only no vote.

On May 14, 2012, the United States Senate confirmed Tharp by an 86–1 vote, with Senator Mike Lee casting the lone nay vote. "I'm honored by both the nomination and the confirmation," Tharp told the Chicago Tribune shortly after the vote. "It's a real credit to both our senators that they worked together to get this done." He received his commission on May 16, 2012. He assumed senior status on September 30, 2026.

Legal offices
| Preceded by Blanche M. Manning | Judge of the United States District Court for the Northern District of Illinois; 2012–2026 | Vacant |
| Preceded by F. Dennis Saylor IV | Judge of the United States Foreign Intelligence Surveillance Court; 2018–2025 | Succeeded by John Robert Blakey |
