= George True Page =

American judge (1859-1941)

Senior Judge of the United States Court of Appeals for the Seventh Circuit
- In office October 1, 1930 – November 4, 1941

Judge of the United States Court of Appeals for the Seventh Circuit
- In office March 1, 1919 – October 1, 1930
- Appointed by: Woodrow Wilson
- Preceded by: Christian Cecil Kohlsaat
- Succeeded by: Louis FitzHenry

Personal details
- Born: George True Page; September 22, 1859 Spring Bay, Illinois, U.S.
- Died: November 4, 1941 (aged 82) La Jolla, California, U.S.
- Education: University of Illinois at Urbana–Champaign read law

George True Page (September 22, 1859 – November 4, 1941) was a United States circuit judge of the United States Court of Appeals for the Seventh Circuit.

== Education and career ==
Born in Spring Bay, Illinois, Page attended the University of Illinois at Urbana–Champaign and read law to enter the bar in 1882. He was in private practice in Denver, Colorado from 1882 to 1884 and then in private practice in Peoria, Illinois until 1919.

== Federal judicial service ==
On March 1, 1919, Page was nominated by President Woodrow Wilson to a seat on the United States Court of Appeals for the Seventh Circuit vacated by Judge Christian Cecil Kohlsaat. Page was confirmed by the United States Senate on March 1, 1919, and received his commission the same day. He assumed senior status on October 1, 1930, serving in that capacity until his death on November 4, 1941, in La Jolla, California.

== Other service ==
Page served as Chairman of the Commercial Merchants National Bank and Trust Company from 1930 to 1941.

== Sources ==
Legal offices
Preceded by Christian Cecil Kohlsaat	Judge of the United States Court of Appeals for the Seventh Circuit; 1919–1930	Succeeded by Louis FitzHenry
