= LaShonda A. Hunt =

American judge (born 1970)

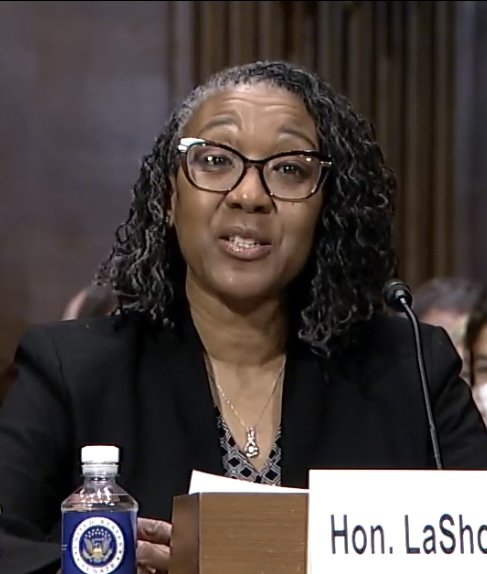

Judge of the United States District Court for the Northern District of Illinois
- Incumbent
- Assumed office May 26, 2023
- Appointed by: Joe Biden
- Preceded by: Charles Ronald Norgle Sr.

Personal details
- Born: LaShonda Annette Stewart; 1970 (age 55–56) Clarksdale, Mississippi, U.S.
- Education: University of Illinois at Urbana-Champaign (BS); University of Michigan (JD)

LaShonda Annette Hunt (née Stewart; born 1970) is an American lawyer who serves as a United States district judge of the United States District Court for the Northern District of Illinois. She previously served as a judge of the United States bankruptcy court of the Northern District of Illinois from 2017 to 2023.

== Early life and education ==
As a child, Hunt lived in public housing in Chicago. Hunt received a Bachelor of Science from the University of Illinois at Urbana-Champaign in 1992 and a Juris Doctor from the University of Michigan Law School in 1995.

== Career ==
From 1995 to 1998, Hunt was an associate at the Chicago office of Sonnenschein Nath & Rosenthal LLP. From 1998 to 2001, she was a staff attorney for the United States Court of Appeals for the Seventh Circuit. From 2001 to 2003, she served as a law clerk for Judge William J. Hibbler on the United States District Court for the Northern District of Illinois. From 2003 to 2005 and then again from 2010 to 2015 she was an assistant United States attorney in the U.S. Attorney's Office for the Northern District of Illinois in the Civil Division. From 2007 to 2009, she was assistant general counsel at Exelon Company and from 2009 to 2010, she was the regulatory outreach manager at Com Ed, a subsidiary of Exelon. From 2015 to 2016, she served as chief legal counsel for the Illinois Department of Corrections.

=== Bankruptcy court ===
On January 6, 2017, she was appointed to a 14-year term as a United States bankruptcy judge of the Northern District of Illinois. She left in 2023 to become a federal district judge.

=== Federal judicial service ===
In December 2021, Hunt was recommended to the president by Senators Dick Durbin and Tammy Duckworth. On January 18, 2023, President Joe Biden announced his intent to nominate Hunt to serve as a United States district judge of the United States District Court for the Northern District of Illinois. On January 31, 2023, her nomination was sent to the Senate. President Biden nominated Hunt to the seat vacated by Judge Charles Ronald Norgle Sr., who assumed senior status on October 4, 2022. On February 15, 2023, a hearing on her nomination was held before the Senate Judiciary Committee. On April 20, 2023, her nomination was reported out of committee by a 14–7 vote. On May 3, 2023, the United States Senate invoked cloture on her nomination by a 54–42 vote. On May 4, 2023, her nomination was confirmed by a 56–41 vote. She received her judicial commission on May 26, 2023. She was sworn in on June 2, 2023.

== See also ==
- List of African-American federal judges
- List of African-American jurists

Legal offices
Preceded by Charles Ronald Norgle Sr.	Judge of the United States District Court for the Northern District of Illinois; 2023–present	Incumbent
