= Joan B. Gottschall =

American judge (born 1947)

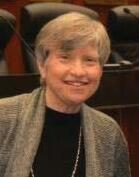
- Gottschall in 2019

Senior Judge of the United States District Court for the Northern District of Illinois
- Incumbent
- Assumed office April 23, 2012

Judge of the United States District Court for the Northern District of Illinois
- In office August 1, 1996 – April 23, 2012
- Appointed by: Bill Clinton
- Preceded by: James Byron Moran
- Succeeded by: Sara L. Ellis

Magistrate Judge of the United States District Court for the Northern District of Illinois
- In office 1984–1996

Personal details
- Born: April 23, 1947 (age 78) Oak Ridge, Tennessee, U.S.
- Education: Smith College (BA); Stanford University (JD)

Joan Beth Gottschall (born April 23, 1947) is a senior United States district judge of the United States District Court for the Northern District of Illinois.

== Education and career ==
Gottschall was born in Oak Ridge, Tennessee. She received a Bachelor of Arts degree from Smith College in 1969 and a Juris Doctor from Stanford Law School in 1973. She was then in private practice in Chicago, Illinois, until 1976, and again from 1978 to 1982, serving as a staff attorney of the Federal Defender Program in Chicago from 1976 to 1978. She was a staff attorney in the legal office of the University of Chicago from 1982 to 1984.

=== Federal judicial service ===
She served as a United States magistrate judge for the Northern District of Illinois from 1984 to 1996. On March 29, 1996, Gottschall was nominated by President Bill Clinton to a seat on the United States District Court for the Northern District of Illinois vacated by James Byron Moran. She was confirmed by the United States Senate on July 25, 1996, and received her commission on August 1, 1996. She took senior status on April 23, 2013.

Legal offices
| Preceded by James Byron Moran | Judge of the United States District Court for the Northern District of Illinois; 1996–2012 | Succeeded by Sara L. Ellis |
