= Paul Edward Plunkett =

American judge

Senior Judge of the United States District Court for the Northern District of Illinois
- In office July 10, 1998 – March 19, 2018

Judge of the United States District Court for the Northern District of Illinois
- In office December 10, 1982 – July 10, 1998
- Appointed by: Ronald Reagan
- Preceded by: James Benton Parsons
- Succeeded by: Matthew Kennelly

Personal details
- Born: July 9, 1935 Boston, Massachusetts, U.S.
- Died: March 19, 2018 (aged 82) Skokie, Illinois, U.S.
- Cause of death: cancer
- Education: Harvard University (B.A.); Harvard Law School (J.D.)

Paul Edward Plunkett (July 9, 1935 – March 19, 2018) was a United States district judge of the United States District Court for the Northern District of Illinois.

== Education and career ==
Born in Boston, Massachusetts, Plunkett received a Bachelor of Arts degree from Harvard University in 1957 and a Juris Doctor from Harvard Law School in 1960. He was in private practice in Chicago, Illinois from 1960 to 1963. He was an Assistant United States Attorney of the Northern District of Illinois from 1963 to 1966, returning to private practice from 1966 to 1983. He was an adjunct professor at the John Marshall Law School 1963 to 1976, and at the Loyola University Chicago School of Law from 1977 to 1982, returning to John Marshall in 1982.

== Federal judicial service ==
On November 23, 1982, Plunkett was nominated by President Ronald Reagan to a seat on the United States District Court for the Northern District of Illinois vacated by Judge James Benton Parsons. Plunkett was confirmed by the United States Senate on December 10, 1982, and received his commission the same day. He assumed senior status on July 10, 1998, due to a certified disability. He was in inactive senior status, meaning that while he remained a federal judge, he no longer heard cases or participated in the business of the court. He died on March 19, 2018, at the age of 82

== Sources ==
Legal offices
Preceded by James Benton Parsons	Judge of the United States District Court for the Northern District of Illinois; 1961–1981	Succeeded by Matthew Kennelly
