= William Harrison Holly =

American judge

Senior Judge of the United States District Court for the Northern District of Illinois
- In office December 31, 1943 – January 30, 1958

Judge of the United States District Court for the Northern District of Illinois
- In office November 8, 1933 – December 31, 1943
- Appointed by: Franklin D. Roosevelt
- Preceded by: George Albert Carpenter
- Succeeded by: Walter J. LaBuy

Personal details
- Born: William Harrison Holly; September 19, 1869 Bellefonte, Pennsylvania
- Died: January 30, 1958 (aged 88)
- Education: read law

William Harrison Holly (September 19, 1869 – January 30, 1958) was a United States district judge of the United States District Court for the Northern District of Illinois.

== Education and career ==
Born in Bellefonte, Pennsylvania, Holly read law to enter the bar in 1891. He was in private practice in Macomb, Illinois from 1891 to 1902, and then in Chicago, Illinois until 1914. He was an assistant state's attorney of Cook County, Illinois from 1914 to 1916, thereafter returning to private practice in Chicago until 1933.

== Federal judicial service ==
Holly received a recess appointment from President Franklin D. Roosevelt on November 8, 1933, to a seat on the United States District Court for the Northern District of Illinois vacated by Judge George Albert Carpenter. He was nominated to the same position by President Roosevelt on January 8, 1934. He was confirmed by the United States Senate on February 20, 1934, and received his commission on March 1, 1934. He assumed senior status on December 31, 1943. his service terminated on January 30, 1958, due to his death.

== Sources ==
Legal offices
Preceded by George Albert Carpenter	Judge of the United States District Court for the Northern District of Illinois; 1933–1943	Succeeded by Walter J. LaBuy
