= George M. Marovich =

American judge (born 1931)

Senior Judge of the United States District Court for the Northern District of Illinois
- Incumbent
- Assumed office January 2, 2000

Judge of the United States District Court for the Northern District of Illinois
- In office April 1, 1988 – January 2, 2000
- Appointed by: Ronald Reagan
- Preceded by: Susan Christine O'Meara Getzendanner
- Succeeded by: John W. Darrah

Judge of the Chancery Division of the Circuit Court of Cook County
- In office 1985–1988

Judge of the Criminal Division of the Circuit Court of Cook County
- In office 1976–1985

Personal details
- Born: George Michael Marovich; January 2, 1931 (age 95) East Hazel Crest, Illinois, U.S.
- Education: University of Illinois at Urbana–Champaign (BS, JD)

George Michael Marovich (born January 2, 1931) is an inactive senior United States district judge of the United States District Court for the Northern District of Illinois.

== Education and career ==
Marovich was born in East Hazel Crest, Illinois. He received a Bachelor of Science degree from the University of Illinois at Urbana–Champaign in 1952, where he was a member of Tau Kappa Epsilon fraternity, and a Juris Doctor from the University of Illinois College of Law in 1954. He was a title examiner for the Chicago Title and Trust Company in Chicago, Illinois from 1954 to 1959. He was in private practice in South Holland, Illinois from 1959 to 1966. He was a vice president & trust officer for South Holland Trust & Savings Bank of South Holland from 1966 to 1976. He was a judge of the Criminal Division of the Circuit Court of Cook County, Illinois from 1976 to 1985. He was a judge of the Chancery Division of the Circuit Court of Cook County, Illinois from 1985 to 1988.

=== Federal judicial service ===
Marovich was nominated by President Ronald Reagan on February 2, 1988, to a seat on the United States District Court for the Northern District of Illinois vacated by Judge Susan Christine O'Meara Getzendanner. He was confirmed by the United States Senate on March 31, 1988, and received his commission on April 1, 1988. He assumed senior status on January 2, 2000. He is currently in inactive senior status, which means that he no longer hears cases or participates in the business of the court.

== Sources ==
Legal offices
Preceded by Susan Christine O'Meara Getzendanner	Judge of the United States District Court for the Northern District of Illinois; 1988–2000	Succeeded by John W. Darrah
