= Christian Cecil Kohlsaat =

American judge (1844-1918)

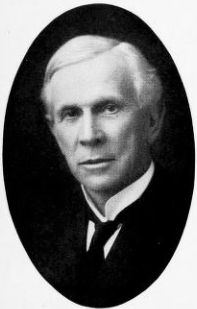

Judge of the United States Court of Appeals for the Seventh Circuit
- In office March 18, 1905 – May 11, 1918
- Appointed by: Theodore Roosevelt
- Preceded by: Seat established by 33 Stat. 992
- Succeeded by: George True Page

Judge of the United States Circuit Courts for the Seventh Circuit
- In office March 18, 1905 – December 31, 1911
- Appointed by: Theodore Roosevelt
- Preceded by: Seat established by 33 Stat. 992
- Succeeded by: Seat abolished

Judge of the United States District Court for the Northern District of Illinois
- In office February 28, 1899 – March 24, 1905
- Appointed by: William McKinley
- Preceded by: Peter S. Grosscup
- Succeeded by: Solomon H. Bethea

Personal details
- Born: January 8, 1844 Albion, Illinois, U.S.
- Died: May 11, 1918 (aged 74) Chicago, Illinois, U.S.
- Resting place: Rosehill Cemetery
- Education: Old University of Chicago; Old University of Chicago Law Department (LLB) read law

Christian Cecil Kohlsaat (January 8, 1844 – May 11, 1918) was a United States circuit judge of the United States Court of Appeals for the Seventh Circuit and of the United States Circuit Courts for the Seventh Circuit and previously was a United States district judge of the United States District Court for the Northern District of Illinois.

== Education and career ==
Christian Cecil Kohlsaat was born on January 8, 1844, near Albion, Illinois. He attended the Old University of Chicago (not to be confused with the current University of Chicago, a separate legal entity) and received a Bachelor of Laws from the Old University of Chicago Law Department (now the Northwestern University Pritzker School of Law), then read law to enter the bar in 1867. He was in private practice in Chicago, Illinois, from 1867 to 1890. He was an engrossing clerk for the Illinois General Assembly from 1871 to 1872, and served as a member of the Board of West Park Commissioners. He was a probate judge for Cook County, Illinois, from 1890 to 1899.

== Federal judicial service ==
Kohlsaat was nominated by President William McKinley on February 23, 1899, to a seat on the United States District Court for the Northern District of Illinois vacated by Judge Peter S. Grosscup. He was confirmed by the United States Senate on February 28, 1899, and received his commission the same day. His service terminated on March 24, 1905, due to his elevation to the Seventh Circuit.

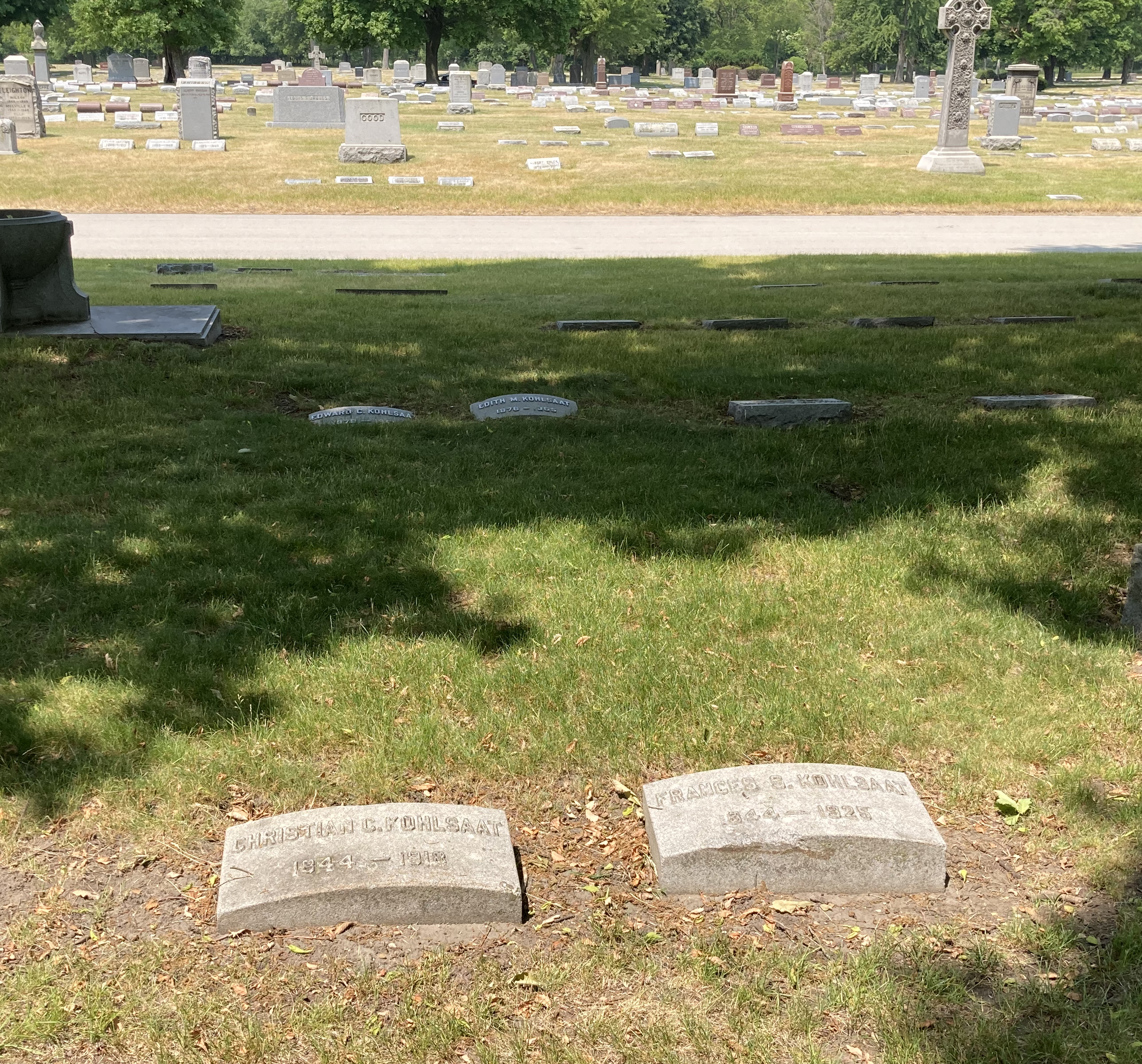
Kohlsaat's grave at Rosehill Cemetery

Kohlsaat was nominated by President Theodore Roosevelt on March 18, 1905, to the United States Court of Appeals for the Seventh Circuit and the United States Circuit Courts for the Seventh Circuit, to a new joint seat authorized by 33 Stat. 992. He was confirmed by the Senate on March 18, 1905, and received his commission the same day. On December 31, 1911, the Circuit Courts were abolished and he thereafter served only on the Court of Appeals. His service terminated on May 11, 1918, due to his death in Chicago.

He was buried at Rosehill Cemetery.

== Sources ==
Legal offices
Preceded by Peter S. Grosscup	Judge of the United States District Court for the Northern District of Illinois; 1899–1905	Succeeded by Solomon H. Bethea
Preceded by Seat established by 33 Stat. 992	Judge of the United States Circuit Courts for the Seventh Circuit; 1905–1911	Succeeded by Seat abolished
Preceded by Seat established by 33 Stat. 992	Judge of the United States Court of Appeals for the Seventh Circuit; 1905–1918	Succeeded by George True Page
