= Sarah Ellis =

Sarah Ellis may refer to:

- Sarah Stickney Ellis (1799–1872), English writer
- Sarah Ellis (author) (born 1952), Canadian children's writer
- Sarah Kate Ellis (born 1971), American media executive

== See also ==
- Sara Ellis (disambiguation)
