= Brian Barnett Duff =

American judge

Senior Judge of the United States District Court for the Northern District of Illinois
- In office October 30, 1996 – February 25, 2016

Judge of the United States District Court for the Northern District of Illinois
- In office October 17, 1985 – October 30, 1996
- Appointed by: Ronald Reagan
- Preceded by: Seat established by 98 Stat. 333
- Succeeded by: Ronald A. Guzman

Personal details
- Born: September 15, 1930 Dallas, Texas, US
- Died: February 25, 2016 (aged 85) Wilmette, Illinois, US
- Resting place: All Saints Cemetery; Des Plaines, Illinois
- Education: University of Notre Dame (A.B.); DePaul University (J.D.)

Brian Barnett Duff (September 15, 1930 – February 25, 2016) was a United States district judge of the United States District Court for the Northern District of Illinois.

== Education and career ==
Duff was born on September 15, 1930, in Dallas, Texas as the third of ten children. He received an Artium Baccalaureus degree from the University of Notre Dame in 1953 and received a Juris Doctor from DePaul University College of Law in 1962. Duff was in the United States Navy as a lieutenant in the JAG Corps from 1953 to 1956 and served in the United States Naval Reserve from 1957 to 1961. He was an assistant to chief executive officer of Banker's Life and Casualty from 1962 to 1967. Duff was a vice president and general counsel of R. H. Gore Co. from 1968 to 1969 and was in private practice from 1965 until 1976 in Chicago, Illinois. From 1971 to 1976, Duff was a Member in the Illinois House of Representatives. He served as the minority whip for the Republican Party. He was also a Judge of the Circuit Court of Cook County, Criminal Division from 1976 to 1979, and then at Circuit Court of Cook County, Law Jury Division from 1979 to 1985.

== Federal judicial service ==
On August 1, 1985, Duff was nominated by President Ronald Reagan to the United States District Court for the Northern District of Illinois, to a new seat created by 98 Stat. 333. He was confirmed by the United States Senate on October 16, 1985, and received his commission on October 17, 1985. Duff assumed senior status due to a certified disability on October 30, 1996.

== Personal life ==
Duff was married to Florence Buckley in 1953. They had six children. Duff died on February 25, 2016. Duff's grandmother was Julia Harrington Duff, the first Irish Catholic woman elected to the Boston School Committee, in 1901.

Legal offices
| Preceded by Seat established by 98 Stat. 333 | Judge of the United States District Court for the Northern District of Illinois; 1985–1996 | Succeeded by Ronald A. Guzman |
