= John C. Black =

American politician

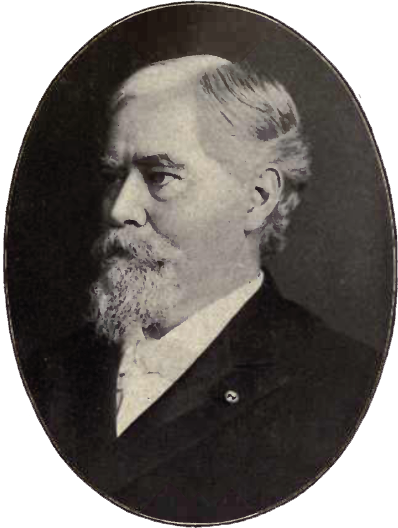
- Black in 1902

President of the United States Civil Service Commission
- In office Jan 17, 1904 – Jun 10, 1913
- Preceded by: John R. Procter
- Succeeded by: John A. McIlhenny

United States Attorney for the Northern District of Illinois
- In office January 12, 1895 – 1899
- President: Grover Cleveland; William McKinley
- Preceded by: Sherwood Dixon
- Succeeded by: Solomon H. Bethea

Member of the U.S. House of Representatives from Illinois's at-large district
- In office March 4, 1893 – January 12, 1895
- Preceded by: Seat Established
- Succeeded by: Seat Abolished

15th United States Commissioner of Pensions
- In office March 19, 1885 – March 27, 1889
- President: Grover Cleveland; Benjamin Harrison (March 4-March 27)
- Preceded by: Otis P. G. Clarke
- Succeeded by: James R. Tanner

Commander-in-Chief of the Grand Army of the Republic
- In office 1903–1904
- Preceded by: Ell Torrance
- Succeeded by: Wilmon W. Blackmar

Personal details
- Born: John Charles Black; January 27, 1839 Lexington, Mississippi, US
- Died: August 17, 1915 (aged 76) Chicago, Illinois, US
- Resting place: Spring Hill Cemetery and Mausoleum, Danville, Illinois
- Profession: lawyer, politician
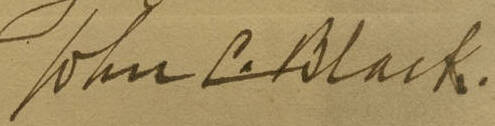
- Signature

Military service
- Allegiance: United States
- Branch/service: United States Army; Union Army
- Years of service: 1861–1865
- Rank: Colonel, USV; Brevet Brig. General, USV
- Unit: 11th Regiment Indiana Volunteer Infantry
- Commands: 37th Regiment Illinois Volunteer Infantry
- Battles/wars: American Civil War; Battle of Pea Ridge; Battle of Prairie Grove; Battle of Fort Blakeley
- Awards: Medal of Honor

John Charles Black (January 27, 1839 – August 17, 1915) was a Democratic U.S. Congressman from Illinois. He received the Medal of Honor for his actions as a Union Army lieutenant colonel and regimental commander at the Battle of Prairie Grove during the American Civil War.

== Early life ==
John Charles Black was born in Lexington, Mississippi, on January 27, 1839, and moved to Danville, Illinois, in 1847. His father was a minister of the Presbyterian Church. Black attended Wabash College, Crawfordsville, Indiana, and became a lawyer.

== American Civil War service ==
On April 14, 1861, Black (along with his brother, William P. Black) entered the Union Army as a private in the 11th Indiana Volunteer Infantry Regiment on April 14, 1861. He became sergeant major on April 25, 1861.

After three months of service, the brothers were mustered out of the volunteers and organized Company "K" of the 37th Illinois Volunteer Infantry Regiment. John Black became major of the regiment on September 5, 1861. He was wounded in the right arm at the Battle of Pea Ridge, Arkansas, on March 7, 1862. On July 12, 1862, John Black was promoted to the rank of lieutenant colonel and became commander of the 37th Illinois Infantry. Black led his regiment against a fortified Confederate position during the Battle of Prairie Grove, Arkansas, on December 7, 1862. The unit suffered heavy casualties and was eventually forced to retreat. Black himself was seriously wounded. An 1896 review of numerous actions during the war resulted in John Black being awarded the Medal of Honor for his actions at Prairie Grove. Black's brother William also received the medal, making them the first of five pairs of brothers to both receive the Medal of Honor as of 2005.

On December 31, 1862, Black was promoted to colonel of the 37th Illinois Infantry Regiment. He was given temporary command of Brigade 1, Division 2, XIII Corps, Department of the Gulf, between November 11, 1863, and February 11, 1864, of Brigade 3, Division 2, Reserve Corps of the Department of the Gulf between February 3, 1865, and February 18, 1865, and of Brigade 3 Division 2, XIII Corps, Department of the Gulf, between February 18, 1865, and March 5, 1865.

Black resigned his commission in the volunteer service on August 15, 1865. On January 13, 1866, President Andrew Johnson nominated Black for appointment to the grade of brevet brigadier general of volunteers to rank from April 9, 1865, for gallant services in the assault on Fort Blakeley, Alabama on that date, and the U.S. Senate confirmed the appointment on March 12, 1866.

== Medal of Honor citation ==
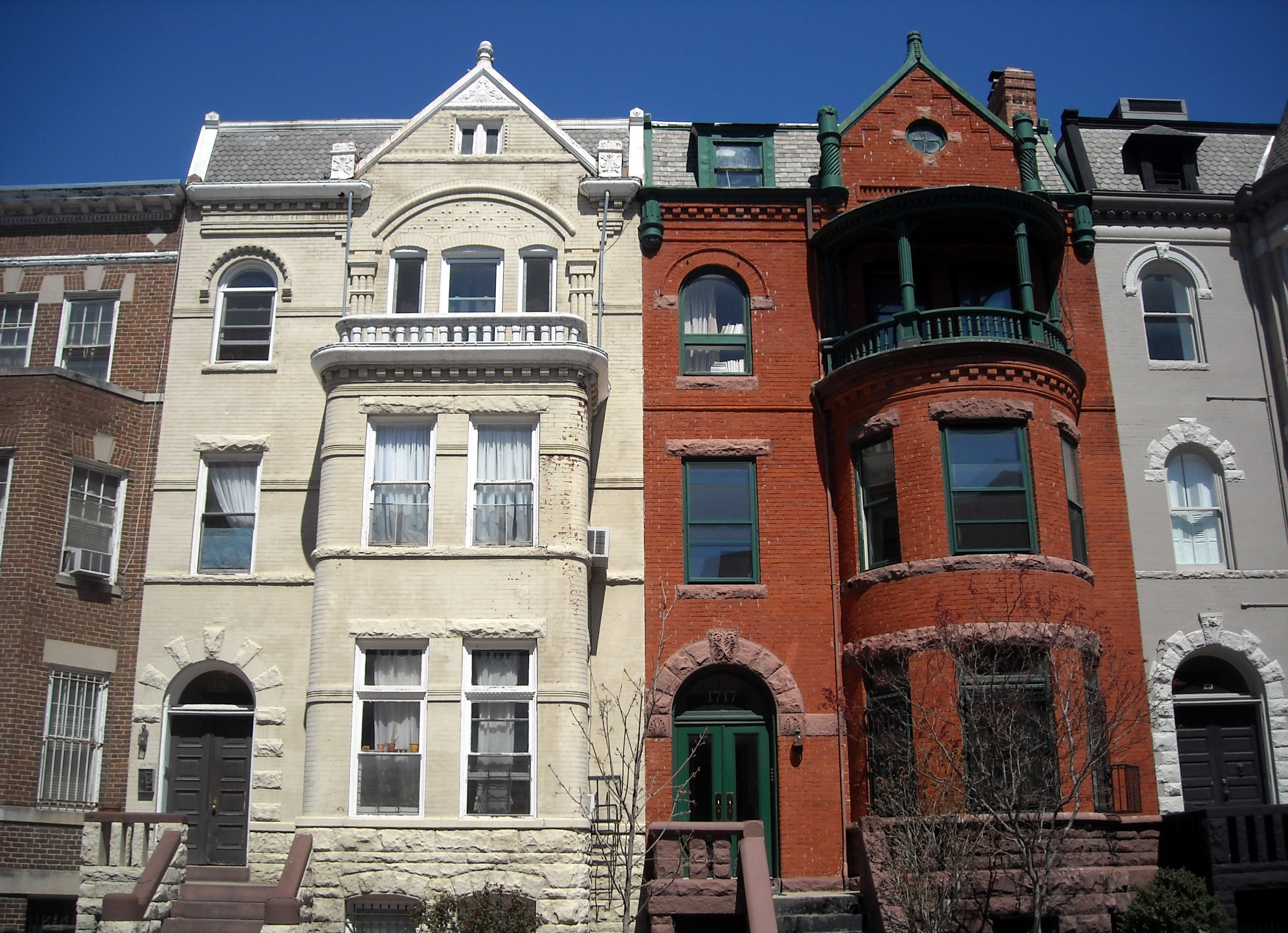
Black's former house (right) in the Dupont Circle neighborhood of Washington, D.C.

Rank and organization: Lieutenant Colonel, 37th Illinois Infantry. Place and date: At Prairie Grove, Ark., December 7, 1862. Entered service at: Danville, Ill. Born: January 27, 1839, Lexington, Holmes County, Miss. Date of issue: October 31, 1893.

Citation:

Gallantly charged the position of the enemy at the head of his regiment, after 2 other regiments had been repulsed and driven down the hill, and captured a battery; was severely wounded.

== Postbellum career ==
Black was a member of the Illinois Commandery of the Military Order of the Loyal Legion of the United States.

Black practiced law and became the United States District Attorney at Chicago. Black was U.S. Commissioner of Pensions between 1885 and 1889. Running as a Democrat, he was elected to the Fifty-third United States Congress, and served from 1893 to 1895. Black declared himself a candidate for the Democratic Party's nomination in the 1893 Chicago mayoral special election. He established a campaign headquarters at the Palmer House Hotel in mid-November 1893. However, at the time, the Chicago Tribune opined that, "the Black candidacy is likely to languish."

In 1903, Black was honored with the office of commander-in-chief of the Grand Army of the Republic, the veterans organization for Civil War veterans of the Union Army, for 1903–1904. Black served as president of the United States Civil Service Commission from January 17, 1904, until resigning on June 10, 1913.

== Death ==
John C. Black died August 17, 1915, at Chicago, Illinois. He is buried in Spring Hill Cemetery and Mausoleum, Danville Illinois.

== See also ==
- List of Medal of Honor recipients
- List of American Civil War Medal of Honor recipients: A–F

== Notes ==
U.S. House of Representatives
Preceded by District elections	Member of the U.S. House of Representatives from Illinois's at-large congressional district March 4, 1893 – January 12, 1895	Succeeded by District elections
Legal offices
Preceded by Sherwood Dixon	United States Attorney for the Northern District of Illinois; 1895 – 1899	Succeeded by Solomon H. Bethea
Political offices
Preceded by Otis P. G. Clarke	United States Commissioner of Pensions; March 19, 1885 – March 27, 1889	Succeeded by James R. Tanner
Preceded by Eliakim "Ell" Torrance	Commander-in-Chief of the Grand Army of the Republic; 1903 – 1904	Succeeded by Wilmon W. Blackmar
