= Rubén Castillo (judge) =

American judge (born 1954)

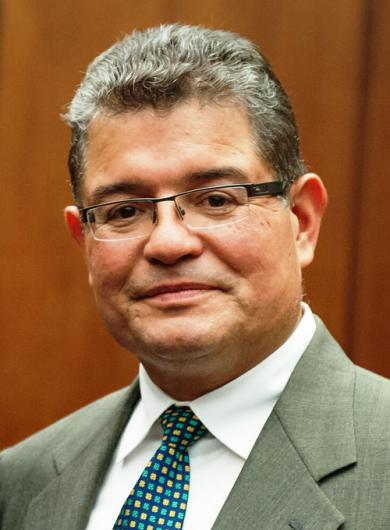

Chief Judge of the United States District Court for the Northern District of Illinois
- In office July 1, 2013 – July 1, 2019
- Preceded by: James F. Holderman
- Succeeded by: Rebecca R. Pallmeyer

Judge of the United States District Court for the Northern District of Illinois
- In office May 9, 1994 – September 27, 2019
- Appointed by: Bill Clinton
- Preceded by: Nicholas John Bua
- Succeeded by: Franklin U. Valderrama

Personal details
- Born: August 12, 1954 (age 72) Chicago, Illinois, U.S.
- Education: Loyola University Chicago (BA); Northwestern University (JD)

Rubén Castillo (born August 12, 1954) is a former United States district judge of the United States District Court for the Northern District of Illinois. In 1994, Castillo was the first person of Latino descent to be named a judge in the Northern District of Illinois, and in 2013 the first to become Chief Judge.

== Early life and education ==
Born in Chicago, Illinois to a Mexican-American father and a Puerto Rican mother, Castillo was the first member of his family to finish college. Castillo earned a Bachelor of Arts degree in political science in 1976 from Loyola University in Chicago, working nights as a clerk at the Illinois Circuit Court of Cook County to put himself through school. He then earned a Juris Doctor from Northwestern University School of Law in 1979.

== Professional career ==
From 1979 until 1984, Castillo worked in private law practice in Chicago as an associate attorney for the law firm Jenner & Block. In 1984, he was named an Assistant United States Attorney for the Northern District of Illinois. He worked as an Assistant United States Attorney until 1988, when he became a regional counsel for the Mexican American Legal Defense Fund. In 1991, Castillo returned to private law practice, where he worked as a partner at the law firm of Kirkland & Ellis until 1994. Following his retirement from the judiciary, Castillo rejoined private practice in the Chicago office of Akerman LLP.

== Federal judicial service ==
On January 27, 1994, President Bill Clinton nominated Castillo to a seat on the United States District Court for the Northern District of Illinois vacated by Nicholas John Bua. At his confirmation hearing before the United States Senate Committee on the Judiciary on March 25, 1994, Castillo told senators that "...in my career I have had the privilege of serving various clients from all walks of life, from some of the corporate 100 organizations to individuals who had literally no assets, and I have always enjoyed the role of being the advocate for those clients, but I really came to a conclusion that I would like to have only one client from now on, and that client being justice, per se, and that is why I want to be a Federal district court judge."

Castillo was confirmed by the full United States Senate on May 6, 1994, and received his commission on May 9, 1994. Upon his confirmation, Castillo became the first Latino federal judge in the state of Illinois. He also served as a Commissioner of the United States Sentencing Commission from 1999 to 2010.

Castillo became the Northern District's chief judge on July 1, 2013 and served his term until July 1, 2019. Castillo retired from active service on September 27, 2019.

== Personal ==
Castillo and his wife, Sylvia Mojica-Castillo, were married in 1978. They live on Chicago's Northwest Side.

== See also ==
- Barack Obama Supreme Court candidates
- List of Hispanic and Latino American jurists
- List of first minority male lawyers and judges in Illinois
- List of Puerto Ricans

== Notes ==
Legal offices
Preceded by Nicholas John Bua	Judge of the United States District Court for the Northern District of Illinois; 1994–2019	Succeeded by Franklin U. Valderrama
Preceded by James F. Holderman	Chief Judge of the United States District Court for the Northern District of Illinois; 2013–2019	Succeeded by Rebecca R. Pallmeyer
