= Ronald A. Guzman =

American judge (born 1948)

Senior Judge of the United States District Court for the Northern District of Illinois
- Incumbent
- Assumed office November 16, 2014

Judge of the United States District Court for the Northern District of Illinois
- In office November 15, 1999 – November 16, 2014
- Appointed by: Bill Clinton
- Preceded by: Brian Barnett Duff
- Succeeded by: Jorge L. Alonso

Magistrate Judge of the United States District Court for the Northern District of Illinois
- In office 1990–1999

Personal details
- Born: November 18, 1948 (age 77) Rio Piedras, Puerto Rico
- Education: Lehigh University (BA); New York University Law School (JD)

Ronald Amaury Guzman (born November 18, 1948) is a senior United States district judge of the United States District Court for the Northern District of Illinois.

== Education and career ==
Born in Rio Piedras, Puerto Rico, Guzman received a Bachelor of Arts degree from Lehigh University in 1970 and a Juris Doctor from New York University Law School in 1973. He was in private practice from 1973 to 1974, and was an assistant states attorney of Cook County, Illinois from 1975 to 1980. He was a staff attorney (part-time), for the Association House of Chicago from 1980 to 1984, returning to private practice in Chicago, Illinois from 1980 to 1990. He served as a United States magistrate judge for the United States District Court for the Northern District of Illinois from 1990 to 1999.

== Federal judicial service ==
On August 5, 1999, Guzman was nominated by President Bill Clinton to a seat on the United States District Court for the Northern District of Illinois vacated by Brian Barnett Duff. Guzman was confirmed by the United States Senate on November 10, 1999, and received his commission on November 15, 1999. He assumed senior status on November 16, 2014.

== See also ==
- List of Hispanic and Latino American jurists

== Sources ==
Legal offices
| Preceded by Brian Barnett Duff | Judge of the United States District Court for the Northern District of Illinois; 1999–2014 | Succeeded by Jorge L. Alonso |
