= Prentice Marshall =

American judge

Senior Judge of the United States District Court for the Northern District of Illinois
- In office October 19, 1988 – April 15, 1996

Judge of the United States District Court for the Northern District of Illinois
- In office July 18, 1973 – October 19, 1988
- Appointed by: Richard Nixon
- Preceded by: Alexander J. Napoli
- Succeeded by: George W. Lindberg

Personal details
- Born: Prentice Henry Marshall; August 7, 1926 Oak Park, Illinois
- Died: May 24, 2004 (aged 77) Ponce Inlet, Florida
- Education: University of Illinois Urbana-Champaign (B.S.); University of Illinois College of Law (J.D.)

Prentice Henry Marshall (August 7, 1926 – May 24, 2004) was a United States district judge of the United States District Court for the Northern District of Illinois.

== Early life and education ==
Born in Oak Park, Illinois, Marshall graduated from Oak Park High School (now Oak Park and River Forest High School) in 1944 and then served two years in the United States Navy. Under the G.I. Bill, he studied at the University of Illinois Urbana-Champaign, earning a Bachelor of Science degree in 1949. While there he was a member of the Phi Kappa Psi fraternity. Marshall then earned a Juris Doctor from the University of Illinois College of Law in 1951. Marshall then served as a law clerk for Judge Walter C. Lindley on the United States Court of Appeals for the Seventh Circuit from 1951 until 1953.

== Professional career ==
A Democrat, Marshall worked in private legal practice in Chicago from 1953 until 1967 at Johnston, Thompson, Raymond & Mayer (which later became known as Jenner & Block), becoming partner in 1961. While at Jenner, Marshall also served as a special assistant attorney general for the state of Illinois from 1964 until 1967. Marshall also built a reputation for starting Jenner's pro bono legal program. Marshall then served as a law professor at the University of Illinois College of Law from 1967 until 1973 and as a hearing officer for the Illinois Fair Employment Practices Commission from 1967 until 1972. In 1959, Marshall, then a resident of Wheaton, Illinois, ran unsuccessfully as a Democrat for state's attorney in DuPage County, a Republican stronghold.

== Federal judicial service ==
Marshall was nominated by President Richard Nixon on June 27, 1973, to a seat on the United States District Court for the Northern District of Illinois vacated by Judge Alexander J. Napoli. Marshall was one of the few Democrats ever nominated to the federal bench by Nixon. He was confirmed by the United States Senate on July 13, 1973, and received his commission on July 18, 1973. He assumed senior status due to a certified disability on October 19, 1988. His service terminated on April 15, 1996, due to his retirement.

== Notable cases ==
During his tenure on the bench, Marshall became known—by his own admission—as an activist judge, ordering the Chicago Police Department in 1976 to hire women and stop discrimination against black and Hispanic officers. He also ruled in 1982 that the random interrogation of Hispanics by what was then known as the Immigration and Naturalization Service was unconstitutional.

Perhaps Marshall's best-known case, however, was a 1982 trial that sent the then-president of the Teamsters Union, Roy L. Williams, to prison for three years. In that case, Williams, Chicago mob boss Joseph Lombardo and three other defendants—one of whom, Chicago insurance man Allen Dorfman, was shot to death while out on bond awaiting sentencing—were found to have conspired to bribe United States Senator Howard Cannon.

== Death ==
Marshall died of cardiac pulmonary failure and bladder cancer on May 24, 2004, in Ponce Inlet, Florida.

== Personal ==
Marshall married Lorelei Towle in 1948. The couple had four children. Lorelei Marshall died in 2005 at age 78. Marshall and his wife sold their house in Wheaton, Illinois in 1978 and moved to Chicago. They moved to Florida in 1990. Marshall's wife told the New York Times in 2004 that he once interviewed for the job of commissioner of baseball.

Legal offices
Preceded by Alexander J. Napoli	Judge of the United States District Court for the Northern District of Illinois; 1973–1988	Succeeded by George W. Lindberg
