= Sara L. Ellis =

American judge (born 1969)

Sara L Ellis
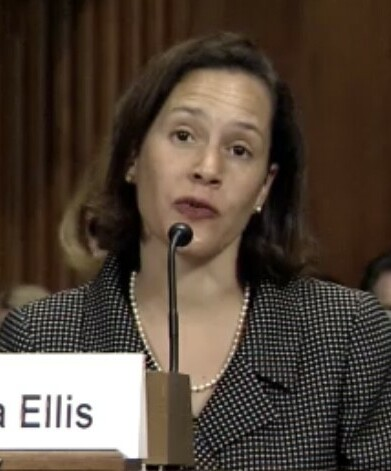
- Ellis in 2013

Judge of the United States District Court for the Northern District of Illinois
- Incumbent
- Assumed office October 8, 2013
- Appointed by: Barack Obama
- Preceded by: Joan B. Gottschall

Personal details
- Born: 1969 (age 56–57) London, Ontario, Canada
- Education: Indiana University Bloomington (BA); Loyola University Chicago (JD)

Sara Lee Ellis (born 1969) is a United States district judge of the United States District Court for the Northern District of Illinois.

== Early life ==
Ellis was born in 1969, in London, Ontario, Canada, to Jamaican-born parents. She became a naturalized citizen of the United States when she was 15 years old.

== Education and career ==
She received a Bachelor of Arts in 1991 from Indiana University Bloomington. She received a Juris Doctor in 1994 from Loyola University Chicago School of Law. She worked as a staff attorney at the Federal Defender Program in Chicago from 1994 to 1999. From 2000 to 2004, she worked at Stetler, Duffy & Rotert, Ltd., a white-collar criminal defense law firm. From 2004 to 2008, she served as assistant corporation counsel for the Chicago Department of Law, handling claims for injunctive relief and civil rights lawsuits. From 2008 to 2013, she served as counsel at the law firm of Schiff Hardin LLP in Chicago, where she was a member of the litigation and white-collar crime practice groups.

=== Federal judicial service ===
On May 6, 2013, President Barack Obama nominated Ellis to be a United States district judge of the United States District Court for the Northern District of Illinois, to the seat vacated by Judge Joan B. Gottschall, who assumed senior status on April 23, 2012. She received a hearing before the Senate Judiciary Committee on June 19, 2013, and her nomination was reported to the floor of the Senate on July 18, 2013, by voice vote. The Senate confirmed her nomination on October 7, 2013, by voice vote. She received her commission on October 8, 2013.

A CNN profile from 2025 explored Ellis ordering federal agents to avoid encounter with protesters in Chicago.

== See also ==
- List of African-American federal judges
- List of African-American jurists

Legal offices
Preceded by Joan B. Gottschall	Judge of the United States District Court for the Northern District of Illinois; 2013–present	Incumbent
