= Charles Ronald Norgle Sr. =

American judge (born 1937)

Senior Judge of the United States District Court for the Northern District of Illinois
- Incumbent
- Assumed office October 4, 2022

Judge of the United States District Court for the Northern District of Illinois
- In office October 4, 1984 – October 4, 2022
- Appointed by: Ronald Reagan
- Preceded by: Seat established by 98 Stat. 333
- Succeeded by: LaShonda A. Hunt

Personal details
- Born: March 6, 1937 (age 89) Chicago, Illinois, U.S.
- Education: Northwestern University (BBA); John Marshall Law School (JD)

Charles Ronald Norgle Sr. (born March 6, 1937) is an inactive Senior United States district judge of the United States District Court for the Northern District of Illinois.

== Early life, education, and career ==
Charles R. Norgle was born in Chicago on March 6, 1937. He served in the U.S. Army from 1955 to 1957. After his service, he attended Northwestern University, where he received a Bachelor of Business Administration in 1964. He then attended the John Marshall Law School, where he received his Juris Doctor in 1969. He was an assistant state's attorney of DuPage County, Illinois, from 1969 to 1971, and was then a deputy public defender for DuPage County from 1971 to 1973. He became an associate judge for DuPage County in 1973, and then a circuit judge from 1977 to 1978, again serving as an associate judge from 1978 to 1981, and as a circuit judge from 1981 to 1984.

== Federal judicial service ==
On September 10, 1984, Norgle was nominated by President Ronald Reagan to a new seat on the United States District Court for the Northern District of Illinois created by 98 Stat. 333. He was confirmed by the United States Senate on October 3, 1984, and received his commission on October 4, 1984. He assumed inactive senior status on October 4, 2022, meaning that while he remains a federal judge, he no longer hears cases or participates in the business of the court.

== See also ==
- List of United States federal judges by longevity of service

== Sources ==
Legal offices
| Preceded by Seat established by 98 Stat. 333 | Judge of the United States District Court for the Northern District of Illinois; 1984–2022 | Succeeded by LaShonda A. Hunt |
