= Philip Godfrey Reinhard =

American judge (born 1941)

Senior Judge of the United States District Court for the Northern District of Illinois
- Incumbent
- Assumed office January 12, 2007

Judge of the United States District Court for the Northern District of Illinois
- In office February 10, 1992 – January 12, 2007
- Appointed by: George H. W. Bush
- Preceded by: Seat established by 104 Stat. 5089
- Succeeded by: Frederick J. Kapala

Personal details
- Born: January 12, 1941 (age 85) LaSalle, Illinois, U.S.
- Education: University of Illinois at Urbana–Champaign (BA, JD)

Philip Godfrey Reinhard (born January 12, 1941) is a senior United States district judge of the United States District Court for the Northern District of Illinois.

== Education and career ==
Reinhard was born in LaSalle, Illinois. He received a Bachelor of Arts degree from the University of Illinois at Urbana–Champaign in 1962 and a Juris Doctor from the University of Illinois College of Law in 1964. He was an assistant state's attorney of Winnebago County, Illinois from 1964 to 1967, and then in private practice in Rockford, Illinois from 1967 to 1968, returning to the Winnebago County government as a state's attorney from 1968 to 1976. He was a judge on the 17th Judicial Circuit Court of Illinois from 1976 to 1980, and on the Second District Court of Appeals, Illinois from 1980 to 1992.

=== Federal judicial service ===
On August 1, 1991, Reinhard was nominated by President George H. W. Bush to a new seat on the United States District Court for the Northern District of Illinois created by 104 Stat. 5089. He was confirmed by the United States Senate on February 6, 1992, and received his commission on February 10, 1992. He assumed senior status on January 12, 2007.

== Sources ==
Legal offices
Preceded by Seat established by 104 Stat. 5089	Judge of the United States District Court for the Northern District of Illinois; 1992–2007	Succeeded by Frederick J. Kapala
