= April Perry =

American judge (born 1979)

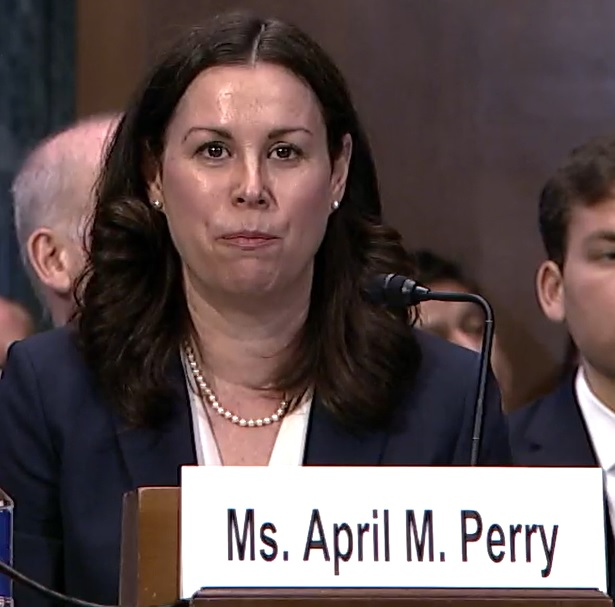

Judge of the United States District Court for the Northern District of Illinois
- Incumbent
- Assumed office November 20, 2024
- Appointed by: Joe Biden
- Preceded by: Nancy L. Maldonado

Personal details
- Born: April Michelle Perry; 1979 (age 46–47) San Diego, California, U.S.
- Education: Northwestern University (BS, JD)

April Michelle Perry (born 1979) is an American lawyer who is serving as a United States district judge of the United States District Court for the Northern District of Illinois. Perry was previously the nominee to serve as the United States attorney for the U.S. District Court for the Northern District of Illinois, but her nomination stalled and President Biden instead nominated her for a federal judgeship.

== Education ==
Perry received a Bachelor of Science, magna cum laude, in 2000 from Northwestern University and a Juris Doctor, magna cum laude, in 2003 from Northwestern University Pritzker School of Law.

== Career ==
From 2003 to 2004, Perry served as a law clerk for Judge Joel Flaum of the United States Court of Appeals for the Seventh Circuit. From 2004 to 2016, she served as an assistant United States attorney in the U.S. Attorney's Office for the Northern District of Illinois. While an AUSA, from 2010 to 2011, she was the deputy chief in the Narcotics and Gangs Section. From 2011 to 2016, she served as supervisory litigation counsel. From 2010 to 2016 she was the Project Safe Childhood coordinator and from 2014 to 2016 she was the Civil Rights and Hate Crimes coordinator. From 2017 to 2019, Perry served as the Chief Deputy State's Attorney and chief ethics officer for the Cook County State's Attorney's Office. From 2019 to 2022, she was general counsel for Ubiety Technologies, an artificial intelligence technology start up. From 2022 to 2024, she was the senior counsel of global investigations and fraud and abuse prevention at GE HealthCare.

=== Nomination as U.S. attorney ===
Perry was one of two candidates submitted to the White House by Senators Dick Durbin and Tammy Duckworth. On June 28, 2023, President Joe Biden announced his intent to nominate Perry to be the United States attorney for the Northern District of Illinois. On July 11, 2023, her nomination was sent to the Senate. On September 14, 2023, her nomination was reported out of the committee by a 12–9 vote.

On January 3, 2024, her nomination was returned to the president under Rule XXXI, Paragraph 6 of the United States Senate. She was renominated on January 11, 2024. If Perry had been confirmed, she would have become the first woman to serve as U.S. attorney for the Northern District of Illinois. Perry's nomination was blocked by then-Senator JD Vance in protest of the indictments of then-former President Donald Trump. Her nomination was withdrawn by the White House on July 11, 2024, when her nomination to the district court was sent to the Senate.

=== Federal judicial service ===
On April 24, 2024, President Joe Biden announced his intent to nominate Perry to serve as a United States district judge of the United States District Court for the Northern District of Illinois. On July 11, 2024, her nomination was sent to the United States Senate. He nominated Perry to the seat being vacated by Judge Nancy L. Maldonado, who was subsequently confirmed to serve as a circuit judge of the United States Court of Appeals for the Seventh Circuit. On July 31, 2024, a hearing on her nomination was held before the Senate Judiciary Committee. On September 19, 2024, her nomination was reported out of committee by a 13–8 vote. On November 12, 2024, the United States Senate confirmed her nomination by a 51–44 vote. She received her judicial commission on November 20, 2024. She was sworn in on November 26, 2024.

=== Notable cases ===
In October 2025, Perry ruled that the Trump administration cannot deploy the National Guard against protestors in Chicago. On October 16, 2025, the 7th Circuit affirmed Perry's order. The Trump administration appealed to the Supreme Court, and on December 23, 2025, the Supreme Court declined to reverse the ruling blocking National Guard deployment.

In 2026, Perry is presiding over the prosecutions of protestors arrested at the Immigration and Customs Enforcement (ICE) detention facility in Broadview, Illinois.

Legal offices
Preceded by Nancy L. Maldonado	Judge of the United States District Court for the Northern District of Illinois; 2024–present	Incumbent
