= University of New Hampshire School of Law =

Public law school in Concord, New Hampshire, United States

Coordinates: 43°12′26″N 71°32′45″W

University of New Hampshire Franklin Pierce School of Law
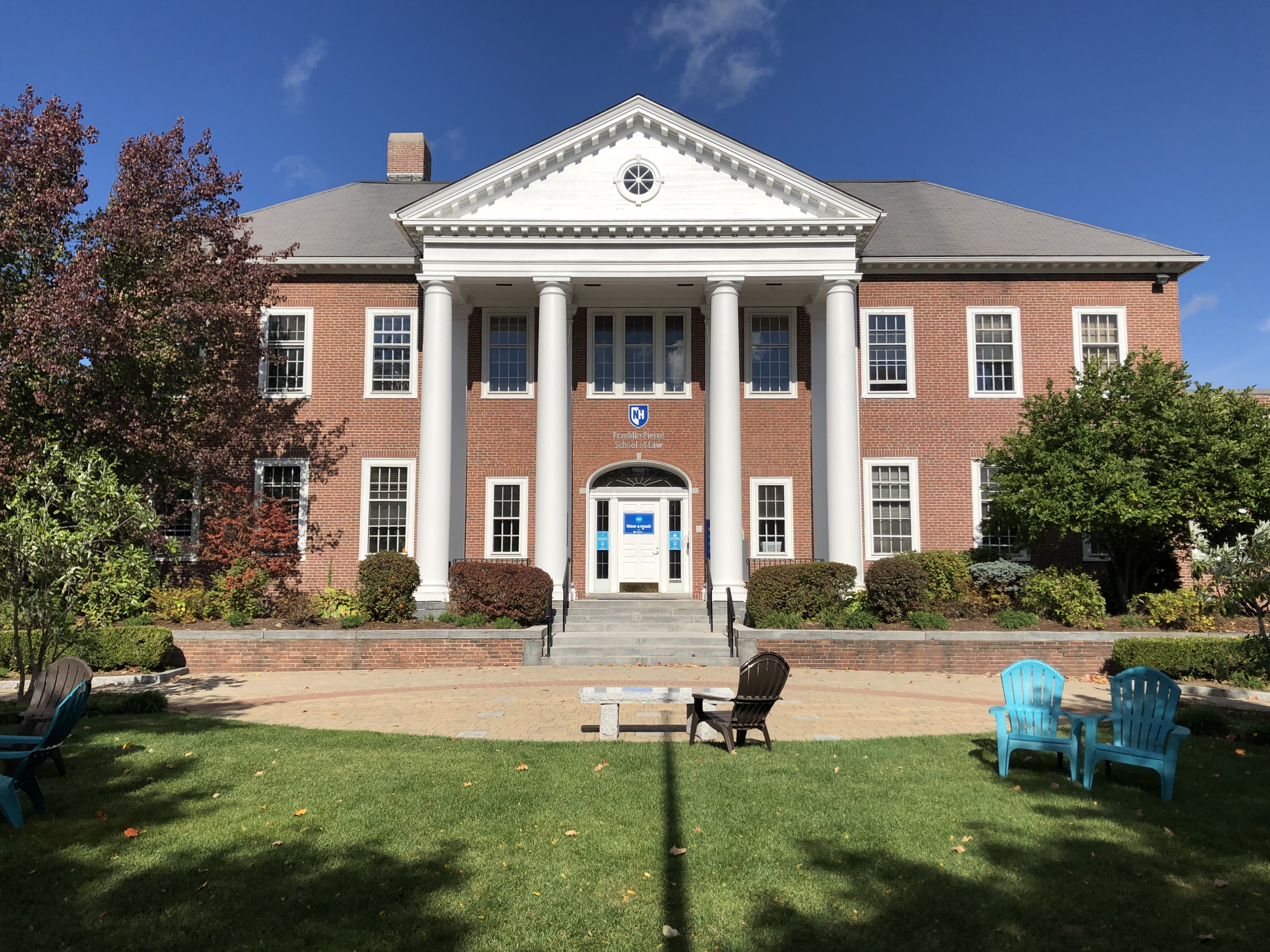
- Parent school: University of New Hampshire
- Established: 1973
- School type: Public law school
- Parent endowment: $336 million
- Dean: Courtney Brooks (interim)
- Location: Concord, New Hampshire, United States
- Enrollment: 596
- Faculty: 33
- USNWR ranking: 98th (tie) (2024)
- Bar pass rate: 97%
- Website: law.unh.edu
- ABA profile: UNH Law Profile

The University of New Hampshire Franklin Pierce School of Law is a public law school in Concord, New Hampshire, United States, associated with the University of New Hampshire. It is the only law school in the state and was founded in 1973 by Robert H. Rines and Frank DiPietro. The school is particularly well known for its Intellectual Property Law program.

== History ==
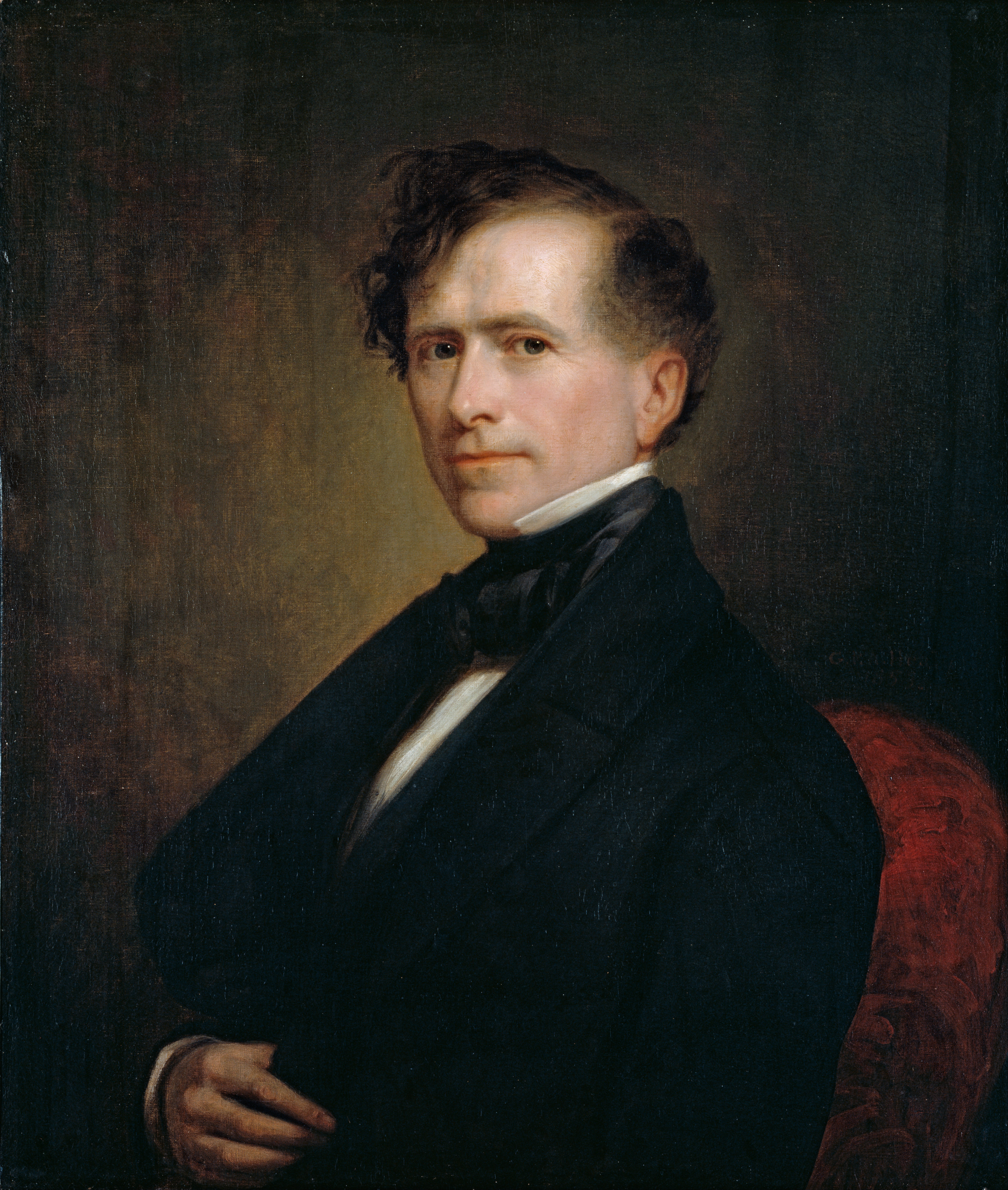
The school was originally named for Franklin Pierce, 14th US president.

The University of New Hampshire Franklin Pierce School of Law was founded in 1973 as the Franklin Pierce Law Center. At the time, it was affiliated with Franklin Pierce College, a private college in Rindge, New Hampshire, and operated under that college's charter. Both institutions are named for Franklin Pierce, the 14th President of the United States and the only to be from New Hampshire. The law center was also closely associated with the Academy of Applied Science, a research institute founded by Robert H. Rines, who is treated as the founder of the law school. As part of its opening, the Patent, Trademark, and Copyright Institute of George Washington University transferred to the law center as the PTC Research Foundation, including its flagship publication, IDEA.

In 1976, the law center graduated its first class. That same year, it split from Franklin Pierce College, beginning its run as an independent law school. That would continue until April 27, 2010, when Franklin Pierce Law Center formally signed an affiliation agreement with the University of New Hampshire. The school was renamed the University of New Hampshire School of Law when the affiliation became effective; the name "Franklin Pierce" was later retained for the Franklin Pierce Center for Intellectual Property.

At the alumni reception during the INTA Annual Meeting in 2019, Dean Megan Carpenter announced the incorporation of "Franklin Pierce" back into the school's name. The school was renamed the University of New Hampshire Franklin Pierce School of Law.

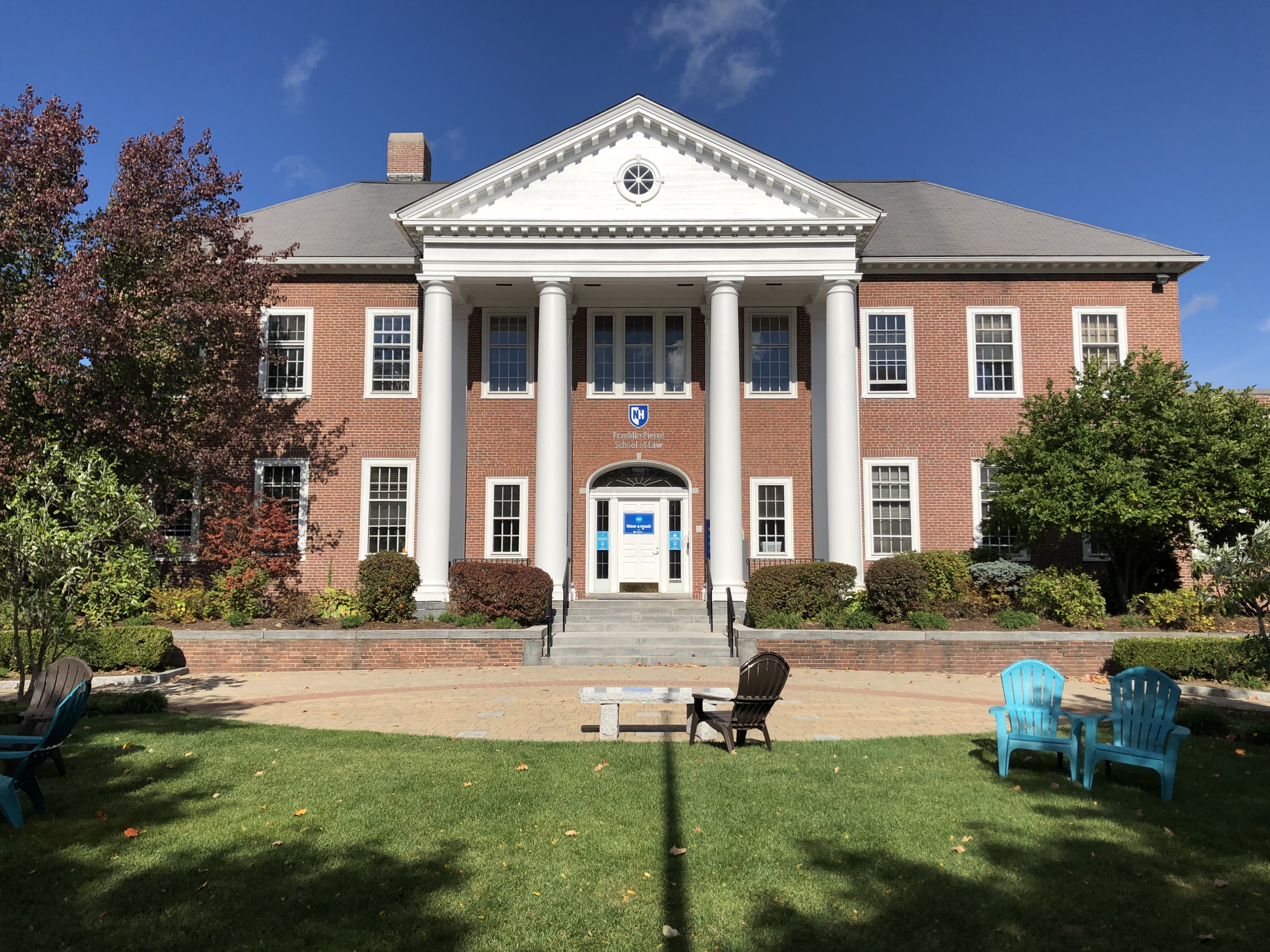
Main building on the Concord campus, which opened in 1976

As of the 2024 rankings, among all ranked law schools in the United States, U.S. News & World Report ranked UNH Franklin Pierce Law 98th. The school was ranked 48th by Above the Law's 2018 rankings which are outcome (i.e. bar passage rate and employment results) oriented, but was unranked in 2022. UNH Franklin Pierce has been among the top 10 intellectual property law schools in the United States for the past 30 years. In its 2021 ranking of "America's Best Intellectual Property Law Programs", U.S. News & World Report ranked UNH Law's program 4th in the nation in the intellectual property specialty rankings. Among online law schools, UNH was ranked #1 by Best Value Schools in 2022.

== Academic programs ==
The UNH Franklin Pierce School of Law offers both a residential and a mostly online hybrid Juris Doctor (JD) program, as well as Master's degree, joint degree, and dual degree programs.

The masters-level programs in law include the Master of Laws (LLM) in Intellectual Property (L.L.M-IP), Master of Laws in Commerce and Technology (LLM-CT), and Master of Laws in International Criminal Law and Justice (L.L.M-ICLJ). The school also confers a Masters of Intellectual Property (MIP), making it one of the only law schools in the United States offering a graduate degree in intellectual property specially designed for scientists, engineers and any interested persons not holding a Juris Doctor degree.

The law school also collaborates with the greater University of New Hampshire System to offer three dual degree programs: JD/MBA with the Peter T. Paul College of Business and Economics, JD/MPP with the Carsey School of Public Policy, and a JD/MSW.

Students who complete specialized coursework may earn a Certificate in Entertainment Law, Health Law & Policy, Sports & Entertainment Law, Sports Law, or Intellectual Property Law.

=== Centers and institutes ===
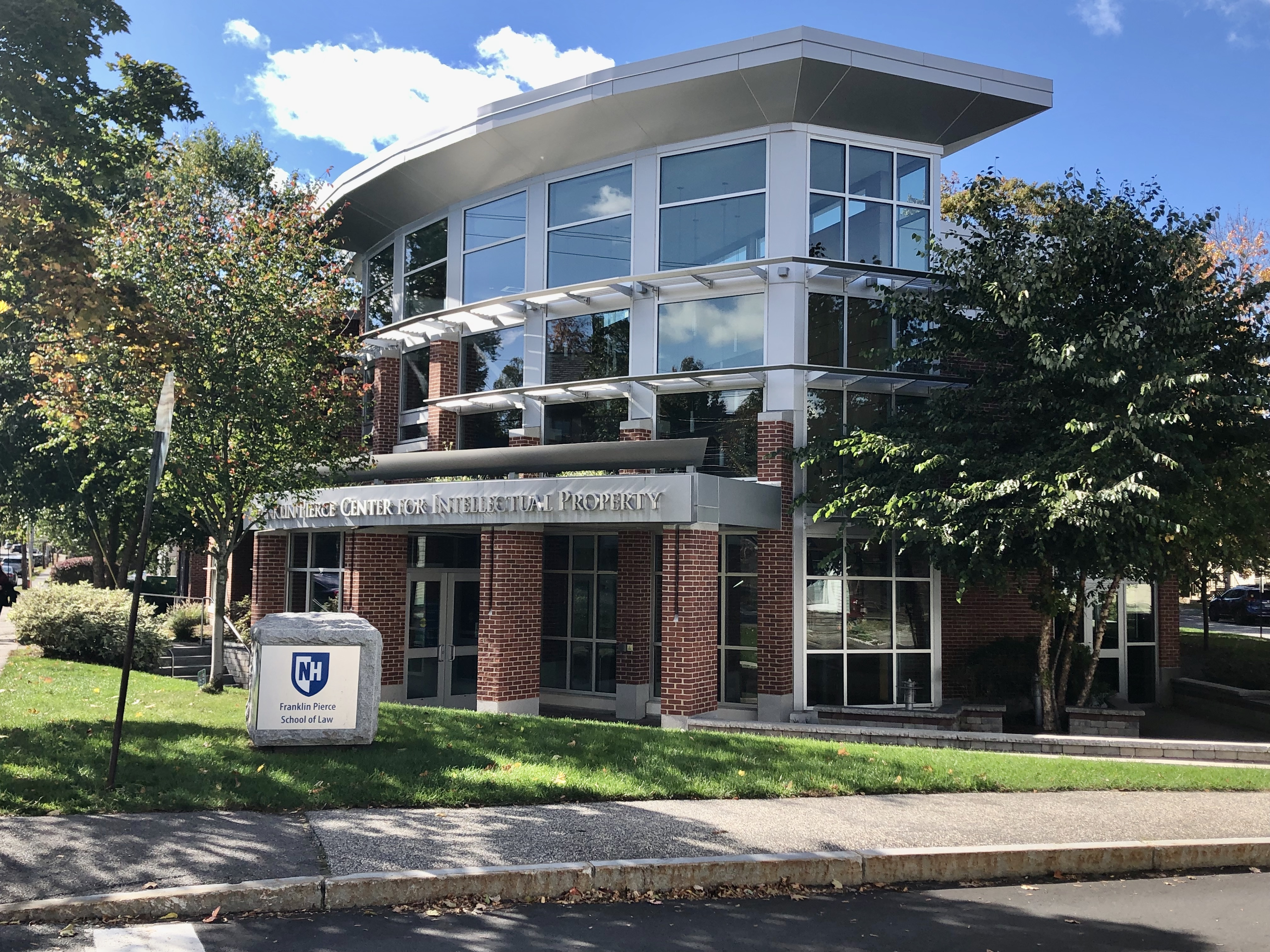
Franklin Pierce Center for Intellectual Property

- Franklin Pierce Center for Intellectual Property
- Sports and Entertainment Law Institute
- Warren B. Rudman Center for Justice, Leadership, & Public Service

=== Hybrid JD Program ===
In 2019, UNH Franklin Pierce School of Law welcomed its first Hybrid JD class. Students in the Hybrid program earn their JD in three and a half years and complete their classes through a mix of in-person and remote instruction. Hybrid students come to the school for an intensive immersion programs four times per calendar year for a total of fourteen immersion sessions during the program. The Hybrid program focuses on Intellectual Property ("IP"), Technology, and Information Law. Hybrid students are typically already full-time professionals in the IP, technology, or privacy spheres. The Hybrid JD program is ABA-approved and is the first Hybrid JD program with a focus in IP.

=== Daniel Webster Scholar Honors Program ===
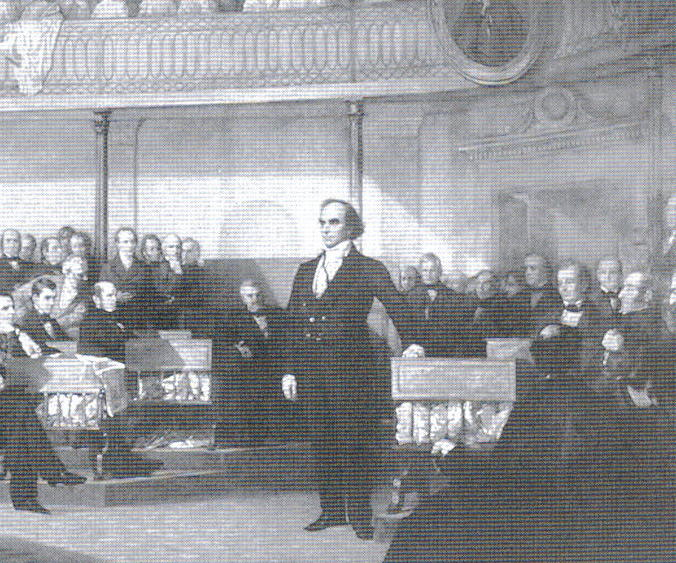
Webster Replying to Hayne by George P.A. Healy. The honors program is named for Daniel Webster.

In 2005, the New Hampshire Supreme Court launched an alternative bar licensing process at the UNH School of Law. The Daniel Webster Scholar Honors Program, a collaboration of the Court, the law school, the New Hampshire Board of Bar Examiners, and the New Hampshire Bar Association, is an intensive practice-based honors program that encompasses the last two years of law school. Students apply to the program during the spring of their 1L (first) year. Enrollment in the program is limited to 24 students per class year. Once accepted to the program, students go through a rigorous program of clinical experiences under the supervision of judges, lawyers, and bar examiners, and compile a portfolio of work. Graduates of the program must pass the Multistate Professional Responsibility Examination (MPRE) and meet character and fitness requirements to be admitted to the New Hampshire bar, but are exempt from taking the state's bar examination. Daniel Webster Scholar graduates may still qualify to sit for the bar examination in any other U.S. jurisdiction. The first class of Webster Scholars graduated in 2008.

=== Clinics ===
The New Hampshire Supreme Court allows second- and third-year law students to appear in court with a bar-licensed mentor. The clinical programs include work in Criminal Practice, Intellectual Property & Transaction, and International Technology Transfer.

=== Intellectual Property Summer Institute ===
The school also hosts the Intellectual Property Summer Institute (IPSI), where students and professionals from around the world gather to take IP courses and attend seminars from prominent IP practitioners and scholars. IPSI was first established in 1987 and was brought back in 2020. In 2023, IPSI was hosted by UNH Franklin Pierce in Silicon Valley.

== Employment ==
According to the 2022 ABA Employment Summary Report, 90% of the Class of 2022 obtained employment within ten months after graduation. 77% of graduates from the Class of 2022 were employed in bar passage-required jobs.

== Cost ==
The tuition at the University of New Hampshire School of Law for the 2023–2024 academic year is $40,000 for NH residents and $48,000 for non-residents. The Law School Transparency estimated debt-financed cost of attendance for three years is $219,793; however, only 3.5% of students pay full price.

== Student Life & Organizations ==
For the class entering in 2023, UNH Franklin Pierce School of Law accepted 51.74% of applicants with 33.51% of those accepted enrolling, while the enrolled students had an average 156 LSAT score and 3.48 college GPA.

Students from around the world attend UNH Franklin Pierce School of Law, and the school celebrates the traditions and cultures of its many international students throughout the year. The school hosts events such as Lunar New Year and the Indian "festival of lights" or Diwali. Each summer, UNH Law holds the Intellectual Property Summer Institute. During Orientation Week, students partake in an annual ice cream social. Fall midterms are closely followed by the Buck Bowl, an intramural touch football tournament. The annual Barrister's Ball is organized by the Student Bar Association and takes place in the spring. With a tradition rich in public service, the school hosts a Pro Bono Week. Students run a variety of professional and cultural organizations, including the Student Bar Association (SBA) which serves as the student government. Students participate in three law journals—IDEA: The Law Review of the Franklin Pierce Center for Intellectual Property, the University of New Hampshire Law Review, and the UNH Sports Law Review — and send Moot Court teams to competitions around the United States.

The law school was originally located in a barn in East Concord before moving to its current location near White Park. An on-campus cafe is run by a nearby food cooperative, the Concord Food Co-op. Students generally live close to campus, often renting rooms from local residents.

== Publications ==
- University of New Hampshire Law Review, formerly Pierce Law Review.
- IDEA: The Law Review of the Franklin Pierce Center for Intellectual Property, a student-run academic law journal and nationally acclaimed intellectual property law journal
- Pierce Law Magazine, an alumni magazine with a focus on the accomplishments of alumni
- UNH Sports Law Review, a student-run academic law journal focusing on sports law

== Notable faculty ==
- John T. Broderick Jr. (b. 1947), former Dean and President; former New Hampshire Supreme Court Chief Justice
- John D. Hutson (b. 1947), former Dean and President
- Michael McCann (b. 1976), Sportico contributor, former Sports Illustrated attorney and writer, and director of the UNH Sports and Entertainment Law Institute
- Dana Remus, former property law professor and former White House counsel to the Biden administration
- Mary W. S. Wong, founding director for the Center for Intellectual Property, subsequently an executive with ICANN
- Megan Carpenter, former Dean, first woman to hold that position

== Notable alumni ==
- Carol Ann Conboy (b. 1947), New Hampshire Supreme Court justice
- Samuel Der-Yeghiayan (b. 1952), United States federal judge for the Northern District of Illinois
- Donna Edwards (b. 1958), former U.S. Representative (D–Maryland 4th District)
- Frank Guinta (b. 1970), former mayor of Manchester, New Hampshire, and former U.S. Representative (R–New Hampshire 1st District) (Master of Intellectual Property)
- Evelyn Handler (1933–2011), former president of the University of New Hampshire and Brandeis University
- John Hart (b. 1965), author of The Last Child
- Paul Jabour (b. 1956), Rhode Island state senator
- Roger Manno (b. 1966), Maryland state senator
- William J. Murphy (b. 1963), former Speaker of the House, Rhode Island House of Representatives
- Tim Ryan (b. 1973), former U.S. Representative (D–Ohio 13th District)
- Louis Schmitt Jr. (b. 1962), former member of the Pennsylvania House of Representatives and current Judge of the Court of Common Pleas for the 24th Judicial District (Blair County, Pennsylvania).
- Matt Soper (b. 1984), current member of the Colorado House of Representatives and first Seventh-day Adventist to serve as member of the Colorado Legislature
- Donna Soucy (b. 1967), New Hampshire state senator
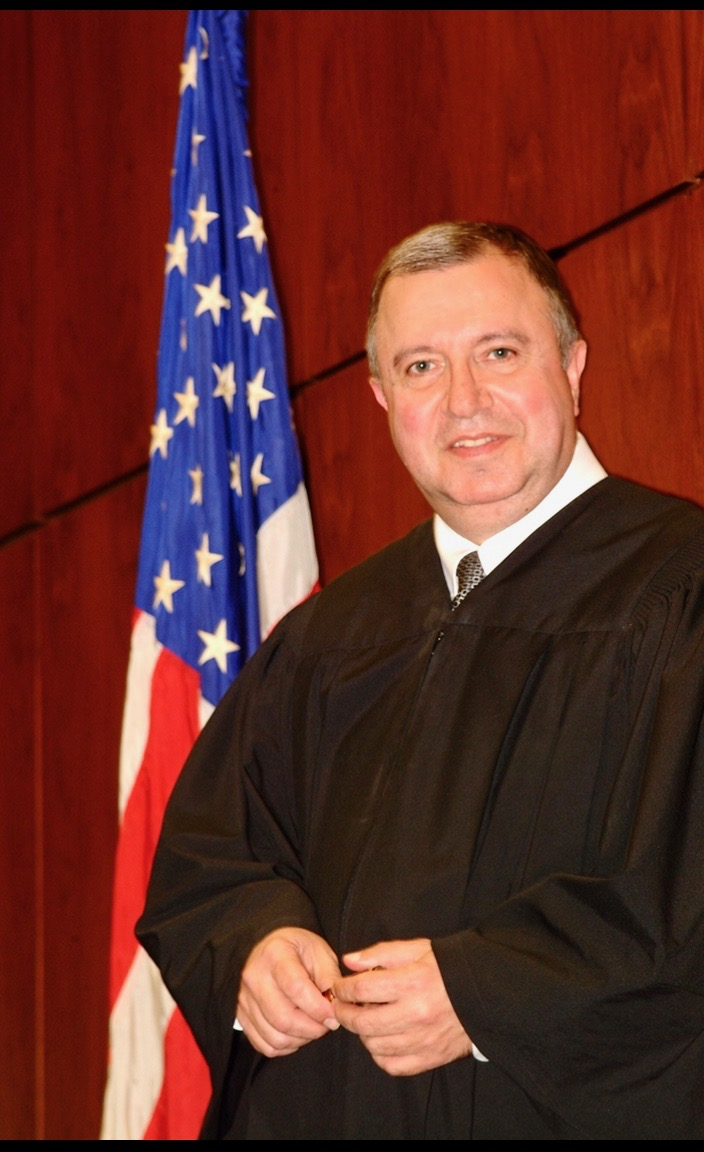
U.S. District Court Judge The Honorable Samuel Der-Yeghiayan

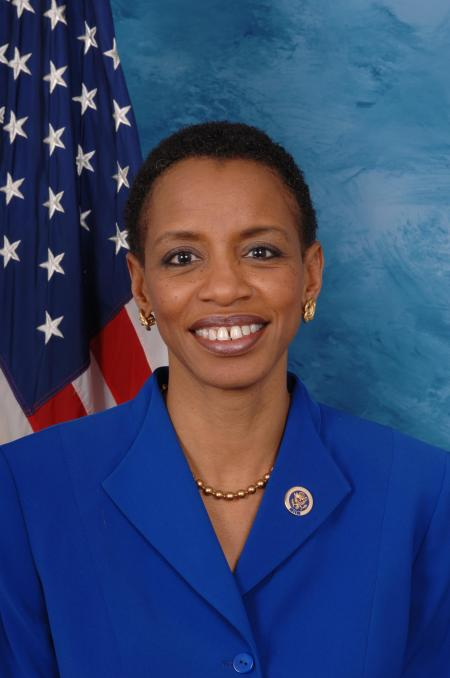
Former U.S. Representative Donna Edwards of Maryland

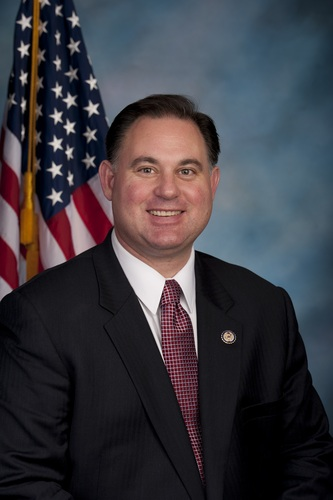
Former U.S. Representative Frank Guinta of New Hampshire

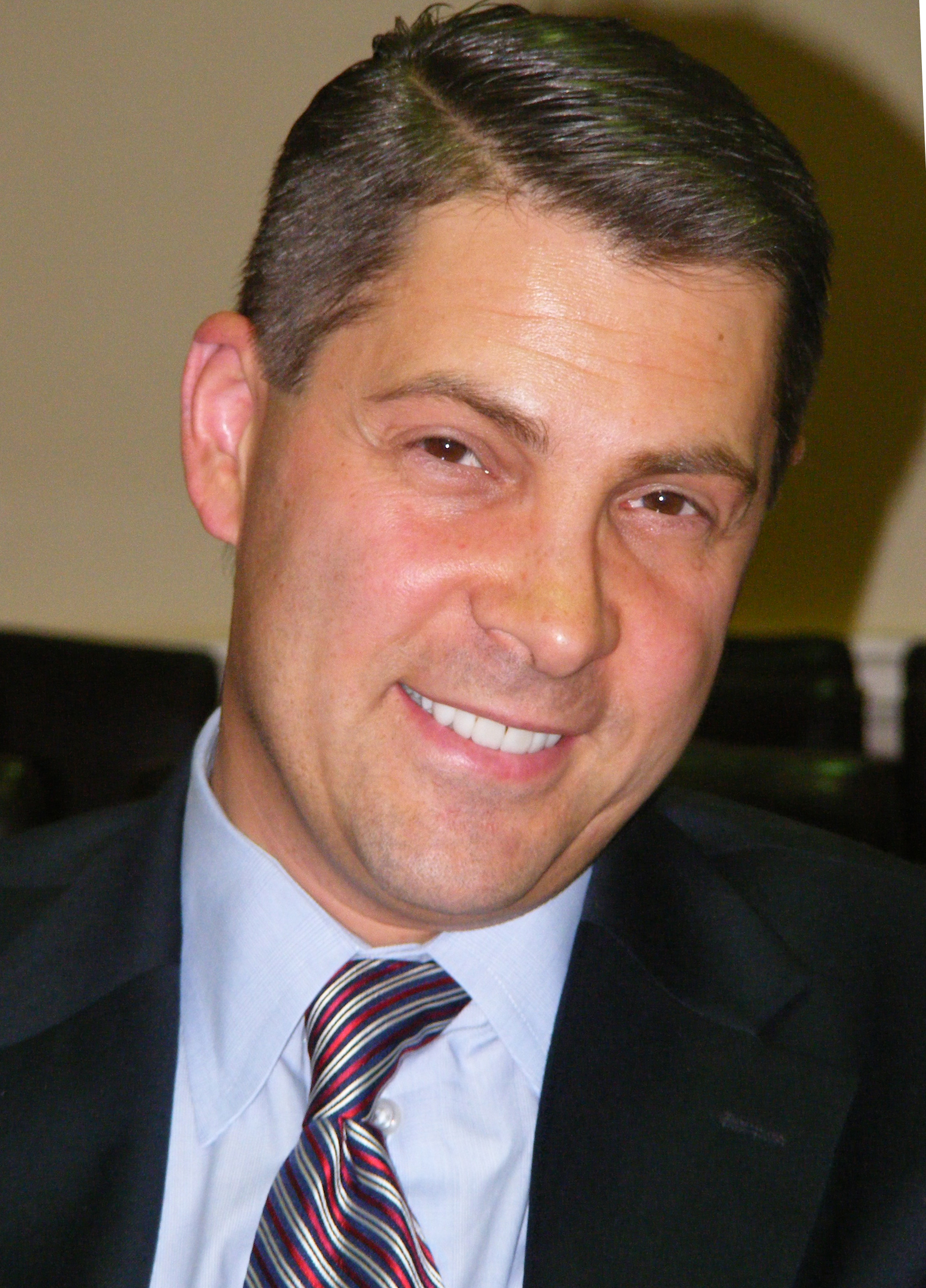
State senator Roger Manno of Maryland

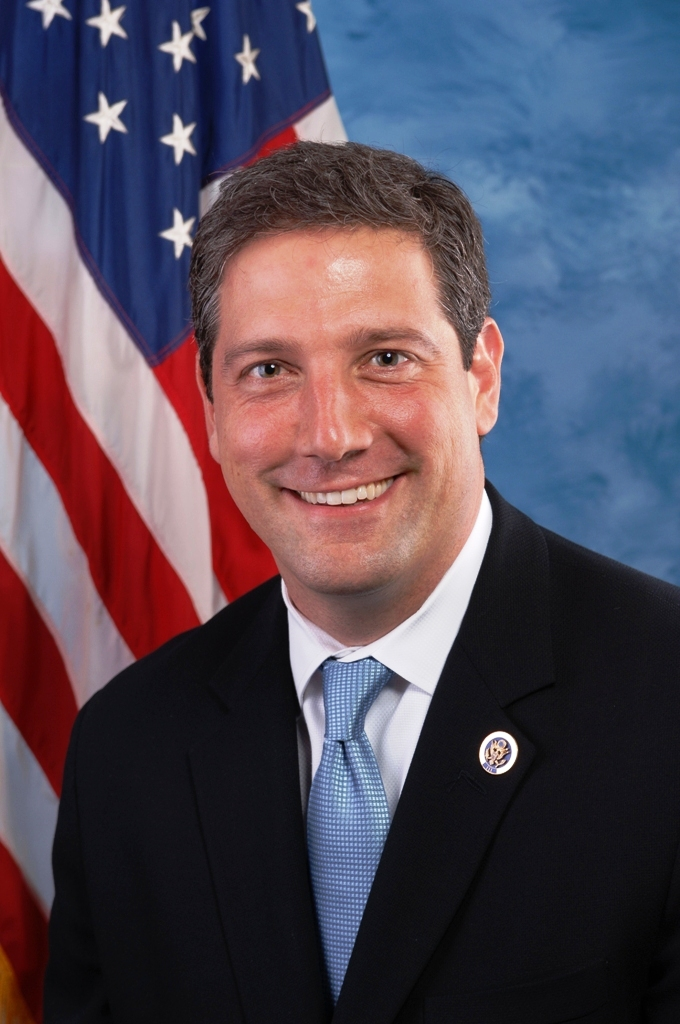
Former U.S. Representative Tim Ryan of Ohio

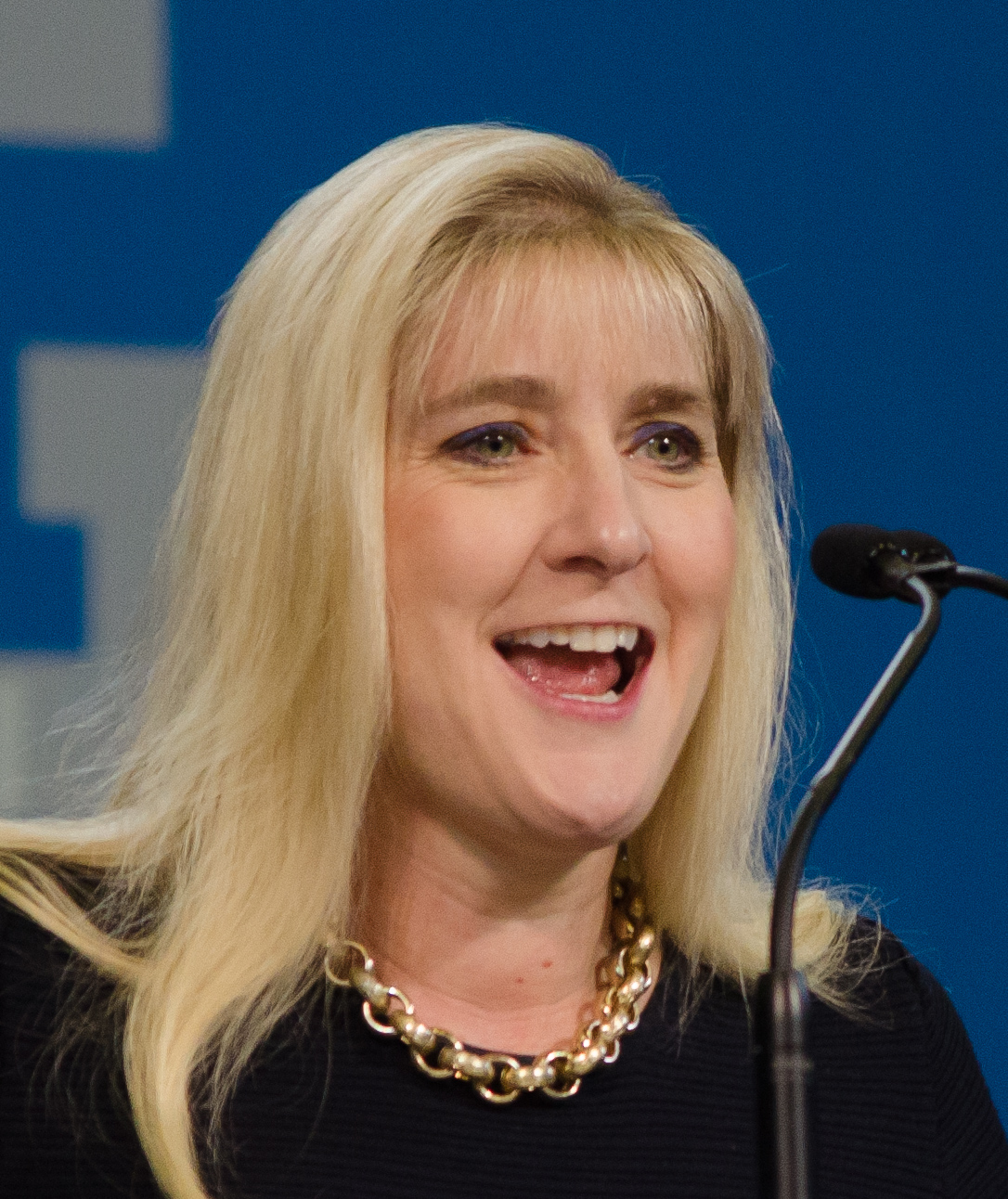
New Hampshire State Senator Donna Soucy
