= IDEA (journal) =

- Discipline: Law, intellectual property
- Language: English
- Edited by: Lea Polito

Publication details
- Former names: Patent, Trademark & Copyright Journal of Research & Education; IDEA: Journal of Law and Technology
- History: 1957–present
- Publisher: University of New Hampshire School of Law (United States)
- Frequency: 3 times per year
- Open access: Yes

Standard abbreviations
- Bluebook: IDEA
- ISO 4: IDEA

Indexing
- ISSN: 0019-1272
- LCCN: 93660501
- OCLC no.: 1607064

Links
- Journal homepage; UNH Franklin Pierce School of Law IDEA blog

IDEA: The Law Review of the Franklin Pierce Center for Intellectual Property is a law review published by an independent student organization at the Franklin Pierce Center for Intellectual Property at the University of New Hampshire School of Law.

== Overview ==
IDEA: The Law Review of the Franklin Pierce Center for Intellectual Property covers scholarly legal articles relating to patent, copyright, trademark, trade secret, unfair competition, technology law, and general intellectual property issues. The Law Review publishes three issues each year.

== History ==
In June 1957, the Patent, Trademark and Copyright (PTC) Research Foundation at George Washington University published the first issue of IDEA under the name Patent, Trademark and Copyright Journal of Research and Education. In 1973, the Franklin Pierce Law Center, founded by Robert H. Rines, became home to the PTC Research Foundation as well as its student-run Patent, Trademark & Copyright Journal of Research & Education. In 1999, the PTC Research Foundation relocated to the Academy of Applied Science, but the student-run journal remained at the Pierce Law Center.

In 1977, the journal first incorporated the wordmark IDEA into its title. In 2002, the journal changed its name to IDEA: The Intellectual Property Law Review. In 2010, IDEA became a publication of the University of New Hampshire School of Law when the Franklin Pierce Law Center merged with the University of New Hampshire.

== Notable articles ==
- Del Gallo, Rinaldo (1998). "Are Methods of Doing Business Finally out of Business as a Statutory Rejection?" (PDF). IDEA: The Law Review of the Franklin Pierce Center for Intellectual Property. 38 (3): 403–437. This article was cited by the Court of Appeals for the Federal Circuit in State Street Bank v. Signature Financial Group, 149 F. 3d 1368 (Fed. Cir. 1998).
- Bertha, Steve L. (1996). "Intellectual Property Activities in U. S. Research Universities" (PDF). IDEA: The Law Review of the Franklin Pierce Center for Intellectual Property. 36 (3): 513–538. This article was cited by the United States Supreme Court in Florida Prepaid Postsecondary Education Expense Board v. College Savings Bank, 527 U.S. 627 (1999).
