= Minear =

Minear is a surname. Notable people with the surname include:

- Jeffrey P. Minear, administrative assistant to Chief Justice John G. Roberts Jr.
- Richard Minear (born 1938), Professor of History at the University of Massachusetts Amherst
- Sarah Minear (1941–2025), West Virginia state senator
- Tim Minear (born 1963), American screenwriter and director
