= Richard N. Billings =

American writer and editor

Richard N. Billings is an American writer and editor.

He served as an editor for Life magazine and also for the Congressional Quarterly. In 1963 he was instrumental in the purchase of the rights to the Zapruder film by Life, which captured the assassination of John F. Kennedy.

In the 1970s he worked as the editor for the House Select Committee on Assassinations, which reinvestigated the assassinations of President John F. Kennedy and Martin Luther King. Later in 1981 he co-authored the book The Plot to Kill the President with the committee's Chief Counsel and Staff Director, G. Robert Blakey, wherein they argued that the mafia had killed Kennedy. In 1992 a revised edition of the book was released, retitled Fatal Hour: The Assassination of President Kennedy by Organized Crime.

He collaborated with Honoria Murphy Donnelly, the daughter Gerald and Sara Murphy, to produce a memoir of her parents, entitled Sara & Gerald: Villa America and After (1982). In 1987 Billings and Will Brownell published a biography of William C. Bullitt, So Close to Greatness: A Biography of William C. Bullitt. The next year astronaut Wally Schirra, one of the Mercury Seven, released his autobiography Schirra's Space, co-written with Billings.

== Authored works ==
- (with John Greenya) Power to the Public Worker. R.B. Luce. 1974. ISBN 9780883310670.
- (with G. Robert Blakey) The Plot to Kill the President. Times Books. 1981. ISBN 978-0812909296.
- (with Honoria Murphy Donnelly) Sara & Gerald: Villa America and After. NYT Books. 1982. ISBN 978-0812910308.
- (with Will Brownell) So Close to Greatness: A Biography of William C. Bullitt. Macmillan. 1987. ISBN 978-0025174108.
- (with Wally Schirra) Schirra's Space. Quinlan Press. 1988. ISBN 978-1557701046.
- (with G. Robert Blakey) Fatal Hour: The Assassination of President Kennedy by Organized Crime. Berkely Books. 1992. ISBN 978-0425135709.
