= Charles P. Kocoras =

American judge (born 1938)

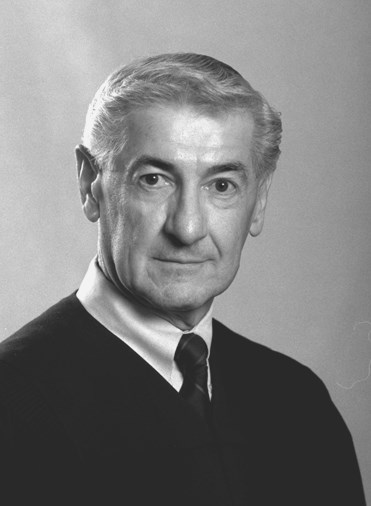

Senior Judge of the United States District Court for the Northern District of Illinois
- Incumbent
- Assumed office June 30, 2006

Chief Judge of the United States District Court for the Northern District of Illinois
- In office 2002–2006
- Preceded by: Marvin Aspen
- Succeeded by: James F. Holderman

Judge of the United States District Court for the Northern District of Illinois
- In office September 30, 1980 – June 30, 2006
- Appointed by: Jimmy Carter
- Preceded by: Alfred Younges Kirkland Sr.
- Succeeded by: Robert Michael Dow Jr.

Personal details
- Born: Charles Petros Kocoras; March 12, 1938 (age 88) Chicago, Illinois
- Education: DePaul University (BS, JD)

Charles Petros Kocoras (born March 12, 1938) is a senior United States district judge of the United States District Court for the Northern District of Illinois.

== Education and career ==
Born to Greek immigrants in Chicago, Illinois, Kocoras grew up speaking Greek in his home. He received a Bachelor of Science degree from DePaul University in 1961 and a Juris Doctor from DePaul University College of Law in 1969. He served in the Illinois Army National Guard from 1961 to 1967 and became a sergeant. He was in private practice in Chicago from 1969 to 1971, and from 1979 to 1980. He was the First Assistant United States Attorney of the Northern District of Illinois from 1971 to 1977. He has served as an adjunct professor of the John Marshall Law School since 1975. He was Chairman of the Illinois Commerce Commission from 1977 to 1979.

== Federal judicial service ==
On June 2, 1980, Kocoras was nominated by President Jimmy Carter to a seat on the United States District Court for the Northern District of Illinois vacated by Judge Alfred Younges Kirkland Sr. Kocoras was confirmed by the United States Senate on September 29, 1980, and received his commission on September 30, 1980. He served as Chief Judge from 2002 to 2006, assuming senior status on June 30, 2006.

== Notable cases ==
Kocoras presided over the September 2006 suit brought by bulk email company e360 Insight against the anti-spam organization Spamhaus. He awarded e360 a default judgement totaling $11.7m in damages, an amount reduced to just $3 on appeal.

In January 2014, Kocoras sentenced Ty Warner, the billionaire sole owner of Ty Inc. (maker of Beanie Babies and other plush toys), for failing to declare and pay income tax on earnings in a Swiss bank account. Warner paid $80 million, including $75 million in interest and penalties, but was sentenced to no jail time due to the judge's respect for his exceptionally generous ongoing philanthropy.

== See also ==
- List of United States federal judges by longevity of service

== Sources ==
Legal offices
Preceded by Alfred Younges Kirkland Sr.	Judge of the United States District Court for the Northern District of Illinois; 1980–2006	Succeeded by Robert Michael Dow Jr.
Preceded by Marvin Aspen	Chief Judge of the United States District Court for the Northern District of Illinois; 2002–2006	Succeeded by James F. Holderman
