= Mary W. S. Wong =

- Education: National University of Singapore
- Occupation: Lawyer

Mary Wong Wai San is the vice president for strategic community operations, planning & engagement at ICANN (the Internet Corporation for Assigned Names and Numbers). Prior to taking up a full-time position with ICANN, she was the founding director of the Franklin Pierce Center for Intellectual Property and a tenured professor at the University of New Hampshire in Concord, New Hampshire, U.S.A.

== Education and background ==
Wong graduated from the National University of Singapore with an LLB. She then received an LLM at Cambridge University and is admitted to practice before the Supreme Court of Singapore.

Wong has served as the vice chair and a two-term elected member of the Council of the Generic Names Supporting Organization (GNSO) at ICANN. Wong's specialty areas are copyright, Internet and international intellectual property law. Among other courses, she has taught advanced topics in copyright, copyright, copyright licensing and intellectual property in the information society. Prior to joining Franklin Pierce Law Center (which subsequently became UNH Law), Wong was an associate professor of law at the Lee Kong Chian School of Business at the Singapore Management University. She was previously special counsel to the international law firm of Morrison & Foerster LLP, resident primarily in New York and Brussels, where she counselled clients on technology transactions and provided advice on international and comparative legal developments in relation to the Internet, privacy, e-Commerce and intellectual property.

== Publications ==
=== Book chapters ===
- Trademark Protection & Free Speech Concerns in ICANN's New gTLD Program, in Trademark Protection & Territoriality Challenges in a Global Economy (Irene Calboli & Edward Lee (eds.); Edward Elgar, 2013) (with Jacqueline Lipton)
- Terrorism & Technology: Policy Challenges & Current Responses, in Global Anti-Terrorism Law & Policy (Cambridge Univ. Press, 2005).
- Intellectual Property Law in Kluwer International Encyclopaedia of Laws(Sing. Ed., Kluwer Law Int'l 1999) (with Ng-Loy Wee Loon).

== Articles ==
- Online Gripesites and ICANN's New gTLD Process (with Jacqueline Lipton, published in the Osgoode Hall Intellectual Property Journal, Vol. 25, Issue 2 (2013))
- Imperatives of Private Arbitration in International Intellectual Property Disputes, (2012) 24 SAcLJ 978 (with Jacqueline Lipton)
- Trademarks & Free Speech in ICANN's New gTLD Program, (2012) 38(1) Mon. L.R.188 (with Jacqueline Lipton)
- "Transformative" User Generated Content & Copyright Law: Infringing Derivative Works or Fair Use?, Vanderbilt J. Ent. & Tech. L. (11 Vanderbilt J. Ent. & Tech. Law 1075 (2009)
- Toward an Alternative Normative Framework for Copyright Law: From Private Property to Human Rights, 26 Cardozo Arts & Ent. L. J. 775 (2009)
- Cyber-Trespass and 'Unauthorized Access' as Legal Mechanisms for Access Control: Lessons from the US Experience, 14 Int'l J.L. & Info. Tech., Issue 3 (Aug. 21, 2006).
- Electronic Surveillance and Privacy in the United States after September 11, 2001, Sing. J. of Legal Stud. 214 (2002).
- Rocking and Ripping on the World Wide Web: The Collision Between Digital Music and Copyright Law, 13 Sing. Acad. of L.J. 323 (2001).
- Additional Damages for Copyright Infringement, 2 Singapore Journal of International and Comparative Law 117 (1998).
- Trademark Infringement under the 1994 UK Trademarks Act in the Singapore Context, 10 Singapore Academy of Law Journal 152 (1998).
- The Nature of the Test of Confidential Obligations and its Implications for the Law of Confidence, Singapore Journal of Legal Studies 557 (1997).
- Character Merchandising under the Copyright and Registered Design Laws of Singapore, 8 Singapore Academy of Law Journal 184 (1996).
- The Acquisition and Consequences of Cumulative Protection Under the Copyright and Trademark Laws of Singapore, Singapore Journal of Legal Studies 167 (1996).

== Amicus briefs ==
- Filed (under Franklin Pierce Center for IP) amicus brief to the United States Supreme Court in Golan v Holder' (609 F. 3d 1076, affirmed); brief cited in the Court's majority opinion.

== Professional appointments ==
- Past chair, International Copyright Committee of the American Bar Association's (ABA) Intellectual Property Law Section.
- Member, ABA Copyright Reform Task Force
- Member, inaugural editorial board for "Landslide", ABA Intellectual Property Law Section.
