= Marvin Aspen =

American judge (born 1934)

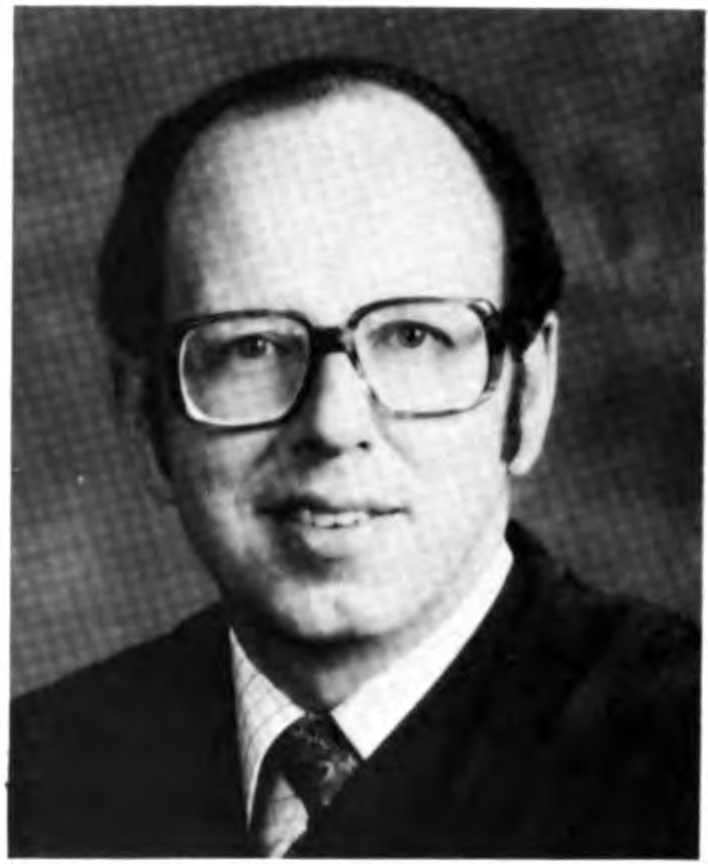

Senior Judge of the United States District Court for the Northern District of Illinois
- Incumbent
- Assumed office July 1, 2002

Chief Judge of the United States District Court for the Northern District of Illinois
- In office 1995–2002
- Preceded by: James Byron Moran
- Succeeded by: Charles P. Kocoras

Judge of the United States District Court for the Northern District of Illinois
- In office July 24, 1979 – July 1, 2002
- Appointed by: Jimmy Carter
- Preceded by: Seat established by 92 Stat. 1629
- Succeeded by: Samuel Der-Yeghiayan

Personal details
- Born: Marvin E. Aspen; July 11, 1934 (age 91) Chicago, Illinois, U.S.
- Education: Northwestern University (BS, JD)

Marvin E. Aspen (born July 11, 1934) is a senior United States district judge of the United States District Court for the Northern District of Illinois.

== Education and career ==
Aspen was born in Chicago. He received a Bachelor of Science degree from Northwestern University in 1956 and a Juris Doctor from Northwestern University Pritzker School of Law in 1958.

He was a law clerk in the Court of Claims Section of the United States Department of Justice in Washington, D.C. in 1958. He was in the Illinois National Guard from 1958 to 1960, and was an Air Force Reserve Command airman from 1960 to 1964. He was also in private practice as an attorney in Chicago from 1958 to 1959, and in 1971, serving in the interim as an assistant state attorney of Cook County, Illinois, from 1960 to 1963, and as an assistant corporation counsel for the City of Chicago from 1963 to 1971, where he was head of the Appeals and Review Division.

He was appointed to the Circuit Court of Cook County for an interim position on September 16, 1971, and on November 4, 1974, was elected to a full term. He served five years in the Criminal Division and three years in the Civil Law-Jury Division. As a state trial judge, Aspen chaired the Recent Developments in Criminal Law, Evidence, and New Judges Committees of the Illinois Judicial Conference.

As an assistant state's attorney, Aspen was assigned to the Appeals Division in the State's Attorney's Office where he argued over 100 criminal appeals before the Illinois Supreme Court.

The cases Aspen handled as an assistant corporation counsel for the City of Chicago included Shakman v. Democratic Organization of Cook County, No. 69-cv-2145 (N.D. Ill.), a case that Aspen handled at its outset until he left the City shortly thereafter to enter into private practice. Shakman involved allegations that the city, County, and Democratic Party conspired to perpetuate party loyalty, monetary contributions, and other forms of patronage as a condition of obtaining City and County employment. These actions allegedly excluded ordinary citizens without political connections from working for the city or County. Aspen also represented Mayor Daley's third-party testimony in the Chicago Seven Trial.

For more than three decades, Aspen has taught courses in evidence, criminal law, trial technique, and municipal law at Northwestern University School of Law. In 1992, he was named the Edward Avery Harriman Adjunct Professor of Law by Northwestern University School of Law. He has lectured at university, United States government, and other legal education programs. Subjects have included judicial management, continuing legal education, and complex litigation. He has planned and participated in legal seminars at Harvard University, Emory University, University of Florida, University of Mississippi, Oxford University (England), University of Bologna (Italy), Nuremberg University (Germany), University of Cairo (Egypt), University of Zimbabwe, University of Malta, University of the Philippines, and the University of Madrid (Spain). He has served as chair of the advisory board of the Institute of Criminal Justice of the John Marshall Law School and as a member of the Georgetown University Law Center Project on Plea Bargaining in the United States. Aspen also has been a frequent faculty member of the National College of the State Judiciary, University of Nevada (Reno) and the National Institute for Trial Advocacy (Colorado). Aspen has served on a special faculty (composed of British and American lawyers and judges) for the NITA Advanced Trial Advocacy Program, which introduces British trial techniques to experienced American Litigators. Aspen has also served on a special faculty (composed of Scottish and American lawyers and judges) for an American Bar Association program, which is designed to acquaint Scottish lawyers with modern litigation and technology.

Aspen has written extensively on numerous legal subjects. His publications include five books and more than two dozen articles.

== Federal judicial service ==
On April 30, 1979, Aspen was nominated by President Jimmy Carter to a new seat on the United States District Court for the Northern District of Illinois created by 92 Stat. 1629. He was unanimously confirmed by the United States Senate on July 23, 1979, and received his commission on July 24, 1979. He served as chief judge from 1995 to 2002, assuming senior status on July 1, 2002.

== Notable cases ==
=== Gautreaux v. Chicago Housing Authority ===
The ACLU-initiated 1966 class action lawsuit Dorothy Gautreaux v. Chicago Housing Authority (CHA) alleged that the CHA engaged in racial discrimination in public housing policy, as prohibited by the Civil Rights Act of 1964. The lawsuit alleged that the CHA built public housing solely in areas with high concentrations of poor minorities, in violation of the federal Department of Housing and Urban Development (HUD) guidelines and the Civil Rights Act. The goal of the lawsuit was to begin building public housing in predominantly white neighborhoods.

HUD entered as a party to the lawsuit, and the case went to the U.S. Supreme Court in 1976 as Hills v. Gautreaux (425 U.S. 284).

On January 23, 2019, Aspen signed an order approving a settlement agreement between the plaintiffs and the CHA. The signed settlement agreement lifts 53 years of court-ordered oversight of the CHA. Under the settlement agreement, the CHA is obliged to, among other things, develop housing for low-income families in mixed-income communities. If the CHA timely performs its obligations under the settlement agreement, the case will come to an end by July 31, 2024.

=== El Rukn Street Gang ===
In 1991, Aspen presided over the trial of six leaders and a financer of the El Rukn street gang. The jury convicted all seven defendants on a variety of serious federal charges that included murder conspiracy, narcotics conspiracy, and other racketeering charges. In June 1992, Aspen sentenced five of the defendants to life in prison and the other two defendants to fifty years. Then on September 20, 1993, Aspen ordered a new trial because the government had knowingly used witnesses’ perjured testimony to convict the defendants and failed to disclose that cooperating witnesses received benefits from the government, a fact that the defendants could have used to impeach the government's witnesses. In so holding, Aspen wrote “This is the most painful decision that this court has ever been obliged to render, making the crafting of this opinion a sad and difficult undertaking.”

=== Johnny Lira ===
Aspen presided over a burglary case involving former Chicago boxer Johnny Lira. Aspen is credited with giving Lira a compassionate criminal sentence that allowed Lira to continue his boxing career. Instead of full prison time, Aspen periodically released Lira so he could continue his training on the condition that he stay out of trouble and, when incarcerated, teach other inmates recreational boxing. Lira went on to become a Golden Gloves champion and the United States Boxing Association's lightweight champion.

=== Michael Jackson copyright infringement lawsuit ===
Aspen presided over Sanford v. CBS, Inc., where the plaintiff, Fred Sanford, accused Michael Jackson of stealing the song Jackson dubbed “The Girl Is Mine.” Jackson testified in Aspen's courtroom to defend against the copyright infringement accusations. During Jackson's testimony, he sang, clapped, and drummed the witness stand.

=== Professional Air Traffic Controllers Organization labor dispute ===
The Professional Air Traffic Controllers Organization or PATCO was a United States trade union that operated from 1968 until its decertification in 1981 following an illegal strike that was broken by the Reagan Administration. Aspen presided over the key labor dispute where the government moved to restrain picketing activities of striking air traffic controllers. Aspen held that PATCO's strike was unlawful but declined to imprison PATCO's leadership.

=== Chicago alderman Roti RICO trial ===
Fred Roti was a Chicago alderman from 1968 to 1991 who was indicted in 1990 for RICO conspiracy, bribery and extortion for fixing criminal cases in the Circuit Court of Cook County, including murder cases involving organized crime members or associates. On January 15, 1993, Roti was convicted on 11 counts, including two out of three "fixing" charges: taking $10,000 for influencing a civil court case and $7,500 to support a routine zoning change. But he was acquitted of the most serious allegation, sharing $72,500 for fixing a Chinatown murder trial in 1981. Roti was sentenced to 48 months' imprisonment followed by a six-month work release program. At Roti's sentencing, Aspen commented that “there is a bigger victim, and that’s the whole democratic process. When you have the courts of law that are fixed, when you have a city government that is fixed, you are attacking the core of democracy. You’re saying that this democracy…is the same as any other corrupt regime.”

=== Other notable cases ===
Aspen presided over In re: Ameriquest Mortgage Co. Mortgage Lending Practices, MDL No. 1715, No. 05-cv-7097 (N.D. Ill. 2005). There, Aspen adjudicated a large-scale mortgage fraud case related to the 2000s housing bubble.

In U.S. v. Board of Education of City of Chicago, No. 80-cv-5124, 621 F. Supp. 1296 (N.D. Ill. 1985), a school desegregation case, Aspen held that the government violated a consent decree that obliged Chicago Public Schools to desegregate.

In U.S. v. John Laurie (N.D. Ill. 1984), Aspen presided over an Operation Greylord case against a former state court judge. In that case, the Scott Turow, author, was the AUSA and former US Attorney Tony Valukas defended Laurie.

Aspen also presided over the first litigation arising from former Chicago Police Officer John Burge's conduct in Hobley v. Burge, No. 03-cv-3678 (N.D. Ill. 2003).

In In re: Aimster Copyright Litigation, MDL No. 1425, No. 01-cv-8933, 252 F. Supp. 2d 634 (N.D. Ill. 2002), Aspen granted a preliminary injunction for plaintiffs (record companies, songwriters, and music publishers) that shut down Defendant's music sharing business.

Aspen granted an injunction that prevented Loyola University from creating a 20-acre lakefill on its Lake Shore campus in Lake Michigan Federation v. U.S. Army Corps of Engineers, No. 90-cv-2809, 742 F. Supp. 441 (N.D. Ill. 1990).

Aspen enjoined construction of on-ramps to Lake Shore Drive in Lincoln Park in Friends of the Parks v. Dole, 87-cv-7991, 1987 WL 18918 (N.D. Ill. 1987).

In U.S. v. Mario Lloyd, No. 89-cr-427 (N.D. Ill. 1990), Aspen adjudicated the criminal trial involving an infamous family drug ring.

== Civic engagement ==
=== Federal Judicial Center ===
Aspen is a past member of the board of the Federal Judicial Center. He has served as a member of the United States Judicial Conference and the conference's Committees on the Administration of the Bankruptcy System, Trial Bar Implementation, and Foreign Court Relationship.

=== Committee on Civility ===
He served as Chair of the Committee on Civility of the Seventh Federal Judicial Circuit. This Committee promulgated civility standards that were subsequently adopted by the Seventh Circuit, and by courts and bar associations nationwide.

=== Chicago Bar Association ===
Aspen has served as a member of the board of managers of the Chicago Bar Association, as chair of the Criminal Law Committee, and as a member of the board of editors of the Chicago Bar Record. He has been a member of the Chicago Bar Association's Special Commission on Criminal Justice, Committee on Continuing Legal Education, and Committee on Development of Law.

=== Illinois State Bar Association ===
Aspen has served on the Public Relations, Corrections, Fair Trial/Free Press and Criminal Law Committees.

=== American Inns of Court ===
Aspen was a founding member of the board of trustees of the American Inns of Court Foundation. He is also a past president of the Northwestern University School of Law American Inns of Court Chapter.

=== Other activities ===
Aspen was a draftsman for and a member of the Illinois Supreme Court Committee to Revise the Illinois Criminal Code of 1961, chair of the Associate Rules Committee of the Illinois Supreme Court, chair of the Illinois Supreme Court Committee on Ordinance Violation Problems, and vice-chair of the Illinois Supreme Court Committee on Pattern Jury Instructions in Criminal Cases.

Aspen was a member of the Federal Bar Examination Committee of the National Conference of Bar Examiners. He served on the Governor's Advisory Commission on Criminal Justice. Aspen has been a member of the Cook County Board of Corrections and the board of the John Howard Association.

== Recognition ==
In a 1988 survey of Chicago litigators, the Chicago Lawyer magazine gave Aspen the highest rating of any United States district judge of the Northern District of Illinois. The Chicago Lawyer named Aspen its 1995 Person of the Year.

Aspen is a recipient of the Center For Public Resources Award for Significant Practical Achievement for Excellence and Innovation for Alternative Dispute Resolutions and Dispute Management. He has received the Northwestern University Alumni Association Award of Merit and an award from the National Center for Freedom of Information Studies (Society of Professional Journalists).

== See also ==
- List of Jewish American jurists
- List of United States federal judges by longevity of service

Legal offices
Preceded by Seat established by 92 Stat. 1629	Judge of the United States District Court for the Northern District of Illinois; 1979–2002	Succeeded by Samuel Der-Yeghiayan
Preceded by James Byron Moran	Chief Judge of the United States District Court for the Northern District of Illinois; 1995–2002	Succeeded by Charles P. Kocoras
