= John Robert Blakey =

American judge (born 1965)

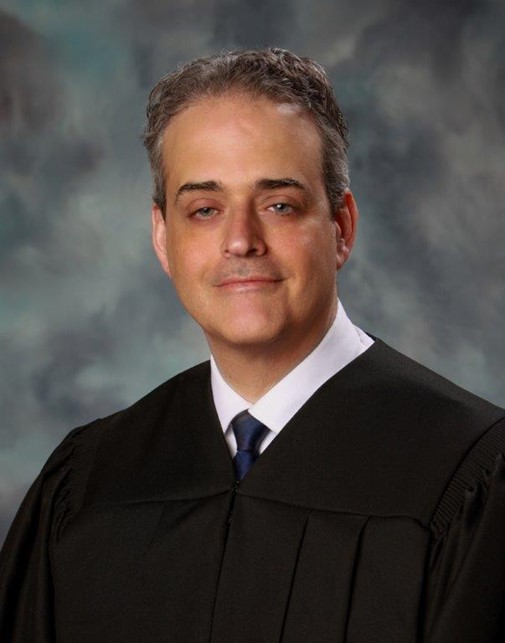
- Official photo

Judge of the United States Foreign Intelligence Surveillance Court
- Incumbent
- Assumed office July 10, 2025
- Appointed by: John Roberts
- Preceded by: John Tharp

Judge of the United States District Court for the Northern District of Illinois
- Incumbent
- Assumed office December 19, 2014
- Appointed by: Barack Obama
- Preceded by: James F. Holderman

Personal details
- Born: August 1965 (age 60) South Bend, Indiana, U.S.
- Relations: G. Robert Blakey (father)
- Education: University of Notre Dame (BA, JD); London Academy of Music and Dramatic Art

John Robert "Jack" Blakey (born August 1965) is a United States district judge of the United States District Court for the Northern District of Illinois and former Illinois prosecutor. He is also a judge of the United States Foreign Intelligence Surveillance Court.

== Biography ==
Blakey was born in 1965 in South Bend, Indiana. He is the son of G. Robert Blakey, a professor emeritus at the University of Notre Dame Law School and authority on the Racketeer Influenced and Corrupt Organizations. Blakey received a Bachelor of Arts degree in 1988 from the University of Notre Dame. He received a Certificate of Fine Arts in 1989 from the London Academy of Music and Dramatic Art. He received a Juris Doctor in 1992 from Notre Dame Law School. He served as a law clerk to Judge William J. Zloch of the United States District Court for the Southern District of Florida from 1992 to 1994. He worked at the law firm of Vedder, Price, Kaufman & Kammholz, P.C., in Chicago from 1995 to 1996. From 1996 to 2000, he served as an assistant state's attorney in the Office of the Cook County State's Attorney. He served as an assistant United States attorney in the Southern District of Florida from 2000 to 2004 and in the Northern District of Illinois from 2004 to 2009. From 2009 to 2014, he served as both the chief of the Special Prosecutions Bureau for the Office of the Cook County State's Attorney and as a special assistant United States attorney in the Northern District of Illinois.

=== Federal judicial service ===
On August 5, 2014, President Barack Obama nominated Blakey to serve as a United States district judge of the United States District Court for the Northern District of Illinois, to the seat vacated by Judge James F. Holderman, who assumed senior status on December 31, 2013. Blakey was recommended for the nomination by Senator Mark Kirk. He received a hearing before the United States Senate Committee on the Judiciary for September 9, 2014. On November 20, 2014, his nomination was reported out of committee by voice vote. On December 13, 2014 Senate Majority Leader Harry Reid filed a motion to invoke cloture on the nomination. On December 16, 2014, Reid withdrew his cloture motion, and the Senate proceeded to confirm Blakey in a voice vote. He received his judicial commission on December 19, 2014.

Legal offices
Preceded by James F. Holderman	Judge of the United States District Court for the Northern District of Illinois; 2014–present	Incumbent
Preceded by John Tharp	Judge of the United States Foreign Intelligence Surveillance Court; 2025–present	Incumbent
