= Barristers' Ball =

Annual event held at most law schools in common law countries

The Barristers' Ball is an annual event held at most law schools in common law countries such as the United States, Canada, Australia, and the United Kingdom. It is generally a formal/semi-formal affair, often near the end of the academic year, conducted by the institution's Student Bar Association as a school-wide gathering. At some law schools, it is referred to as a "law school prom," given its timing during the school year.
