= G. Robert Blakey =

American attorney and law professor (1936–2026)

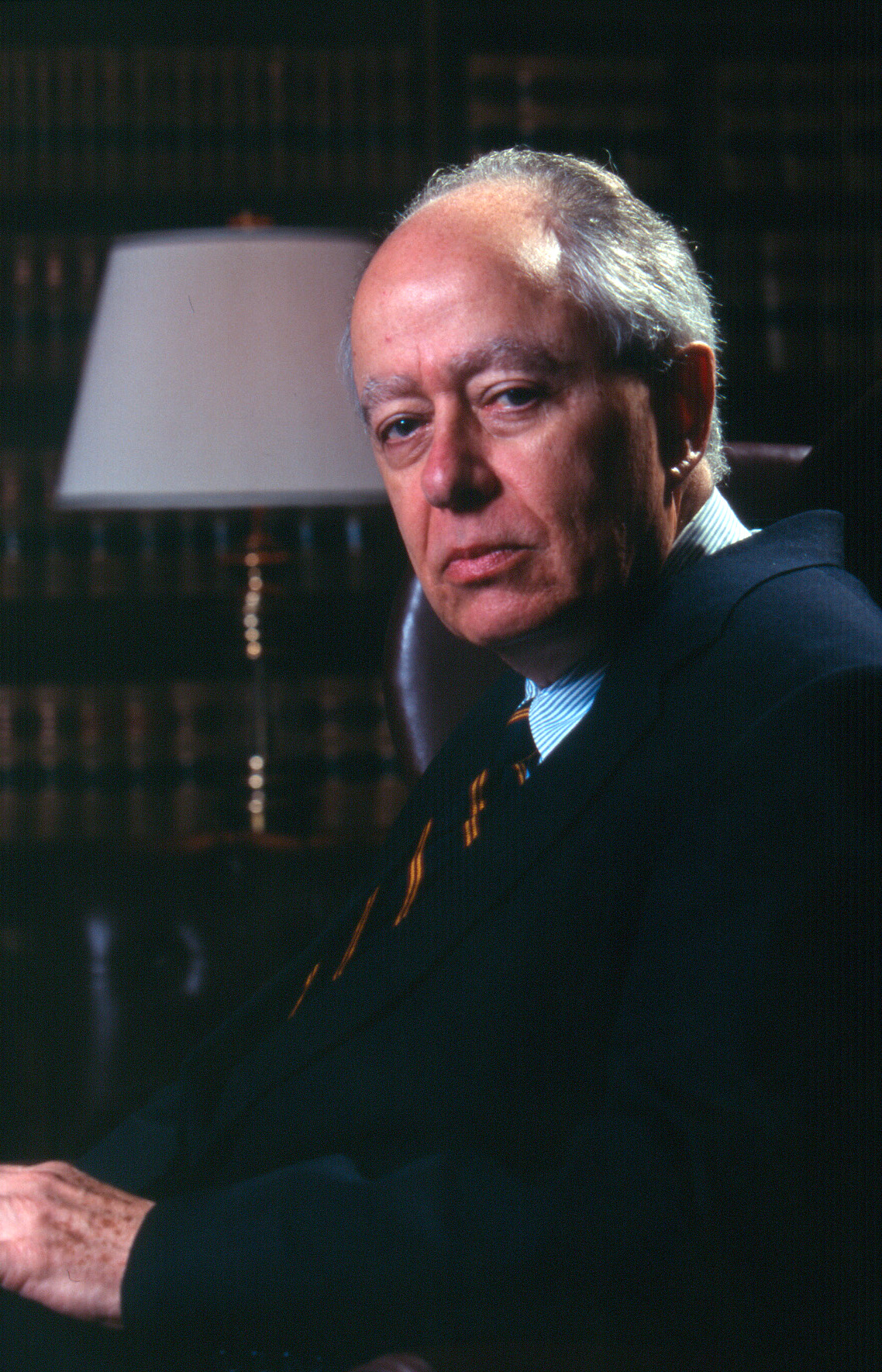
- Born: January 7, 1936; Burlington, North Carolina, U.S.
- Died: May 1, 2026 (aged 90); Chicago, Illinois, U.S.
- Citizenship: United States
- Education: University of Notre Dame (BA, JD)
- Occupation: Law professor
- Employer: Notre Dame Law School
- Known for: Racketeer Influenced and Corrupt Organizations Act (RICO)
- Spouse: Elaine Menard (m. 1958; died 2002)
- Children: 8, including John
- Relatives: 18 grandchildren, 3 great grandchildren

George Robert Blakey (January 7, 1936 – May 1, 2026) was an American attorney and law professor. He was best known for his work in connection with drafting the Racketeer Influenced and Corrupt Organizations Act (RICO) and for scholarship on that subject. He was later the Chief Counsel and Staff Director for the House Select Committee on Assassinations in the late 1970s which reinvestigated the assassinations of President John F. Kennedy and Martin Luther King Jr.

== Background ==
Blakey, an American Catholic of Irish descent, was born in Burlington, North Carolina. His father was president of the First National Bank of Burlington. He graduated from the University of Notre Dame in 1957, earning a degree in philosophy with honors, and was elected to Phi Beta Kappa. He then attended Notre Dame Law School, where he was an associate editor of the Notre Dame Law Review and was awarded a J.D. in 1960.

In April 1958, during his first year of law school, Blakey married Elaine Menard, a graduate of St. Mary's College. The couple had 8 children, and remained married until her death in 2002. He was the father of John Robert Blakey, a United States District Judge of the United States District Court for the Northern District of Illinois, who was formerly chief of the Special Prosecutions Bureau for the Cook County State's Attorney and a special assistant attorney in the United States District Court for the Northern District of Illinois.

== RICO and other legislation ==
Under the close supervision of Senator John Little McClellan, the Chairman of the committee for which he worked, Blakey drafted the "RICO Act," Title IX of the Organized Crime Control Act of 1970, signed into law by Richard M. Nixon, who gifted Blakey the pen with which he signed it. While in law school, Blakey edited a student note on the unsuccessful prosecution of attendees at the Apalachin Meeting, which first sparked his interest in organized crime; he also wrote a note that analyzed civil liberties in the union movement. In 1960, after law school, Blakey joined the United States Department of Justice under its Honor Program, and he became a Special Attorney in the Organized Crime and Racketeering Section of the Criminal Division of the department. After Robert F. Kennedy became Attorney General, the department began a major effort to bring criminal prosecutions against organized crime members, corrupt political figures, and faithless union officials. The Section assigned Blakey to the effort. He remained at Justice until 1964, leaving the summer after the November 1963 assassination of John F. Kennedy.

Subsequently, numerous states passed racketeering legislation with Blakey's assistance modeled on the federal statute. In addition, under the close supervision of McClellan, Blakey also drafted Title III on wiretapping of the Omnibus Crime Control and Safe Streets Act of 1968. Numerous states, too, have wiretapping legislation modeled on the federal statute, and Blakey aided in those efforts. "Rico" was the name of an Italian American mobster in the 1930 gangster movie Little Caesar, from which Blakey may have derived the name.

== Assassinations committee ==
Blakey was a Notre Dame law professor from 1964 to 1969, when he returned to Washington as Chief Counsel of Subcommittee on Criminal Laws and Procedures of the Senate Judiciary Committee. John Little McClellan was the Chairman of the Subcommittee. Blakey credits the success of his drafting work to the dedication to needs of law enforcement, the understanding of the drafting and the processing of legislation and basic sense of fairness of McClellan as well as the extraordinary confidence other members of the Senate placed in McClellan. Only he could have seen to the successful completion of Blakey's handiwork so if Blakey was its draftsman, McClellan was its architect and master builder.

During 1967, he was a Consultant on organized crime to the President's Commission on Law Enforcement and the Administration of Justice (also known as the Katzenbach Commission); Lyndon B. Johnson created the commission to examine crime in America. It recommended, among other measures, new racketeering and wiretapping legislation.

Blakey was Chief Counsel and Staff Director to the U.S. House Select Committee on Assassinations from 1977 to 1979, which investigated the assassinations of John F. Kennedy and Martin Luther King Jr. under the direction of Louis Stokes. Blakey also helped Stokes draft the President John F. Kennedy Assassination Records Collection Act of 1992. He and Richard Billings, the editor of the final report of the committee, would later write two books about the assassination.

In 1981 he published the book The Plot to Kill the President, co-authored with Richard N. Billings, wherein they argued that the mafia assassinated President Kennedy. In September 1981 Blakey was featured on William F. Buckley's Firing Line to discuss the Warren Report. In 1992 a revised edition of the book he co-wrote with Billings was released, retitled Fatal Hour: The Assassination of President Kennedy by Organized Crime. He made an appearance in the 1988 Jack Anderson documentary American Expose: Who Killed JFK?. Later he was interviewed for the 1993 documentary Who Was Lee Harvey Oswald? produced by PBS's Frontline. He attended the Assassination Records Review Board's "Review Board Experts' Conference" in May 1995.

== Supreme Court appearances ==
In Blakey's first appearance before the United States Supreme Court, he filed a brief on behalf of the Attorneys General of Massachusetts and Oregon and the National District Attorneys Association in the case of Berger v. New York (1967), which dealt with wiretapping. He argued on behalf of the Securities Investor Protection Corporation in what became Holmes v. SIPC (1992); he argued on behalf of anti-abortion activist Joseph Scheidler in what became Scheidler v. National Organization for Women (2006), and he argued on behalf of the beneficiaries of insurance policies in what became Humana, Inc. v. Forsyth (1999).

== Teaching ==
Blakey served as a law professor at Notre Dame Law School from 1964 to 1969. From 1973 to 1980, he served as a law professor at Cornell Law School, and was director of the Cornell Institute on Organized Crime. In 1980, Blakey returned to teaching law at Notre Dame, and in 1985 was named the William J. and Dorothy K. O'Neill Professor of Law there. Blakey retired from teaching in 2012 and received emeritus status with Notre Dame Law School.

== Whistleblowing and Bar Discipline ==
In fall 2007, Blakey contacted New York Times reporter David Cay Johnston regarding allegations of fraud involving General Electric made by a former student, Adriana Koeck. While the Times declined to publish Johnston's article, he received permission from the Times to publish elsewhere, and the story was published on June 30, 2008, in Tax Notes International. The article outlined allegations against the company's Lighting subsidiary in Brazil of tax fraud through Value-Added Tax (VAT) evasion of potentially up to $19 million. Johnston references opinion letters from Brazilian lawyers commissioned by GE, who warned the company of "criminal tax implication" and potential charges of tax evasion, labor tax fraud, and collusion among other crimes. Additionally, the article highlights the existence of previous whistleblowers who expressed fear for their safety and that of their families against violent retaliation in related tax matters regarding GE's Brazil operations. Johnston's allegations led to General Electric being listed in Multinational Monitor's 10 Worst Corporations list for 2008.

In October 2015, Blakey was issued an Informal Admonition, the lowest form of discipline possible, by the D.C. Office of Bar Counsel as a result of charges made against him for disclosing confidential documents of the General Electric company to Johnston. In addition to Johnston, these documents were shared by Blakey and Koeck with the United States Department of Justice, federal prosecutors in Brazil, the United States Securities and Exchange Commission. Blakey told the Bar Counsel office that he believed that the documents could be disclosed because they were covered by a crime/fraud exception to rules forbidding lawyers from disclosing clients' confidential information. Whistleblower lawyers have drawn parallels between this case and that of Thomas Tamm, a former attorney for the Department of Justice who was charged with calling a reporter from a pay phone to publicize the federal government's program of illegal wiretapping.

The repercussions of the actions of Blakey extend far beyond the initial disclosure. Blakey's work influenced Brazilian Act 12.850 which empowered Brazilian law enforcement to investigate criminal organizations in the country. In his 2018 Notre Dame commencement address, Brazilian Judge Sérgio Moro accentuated the global resonance of Blakey's contributions, highlighting Blakey's influence in prosecuting organized crime and corruption, and shaping Moro's own efforts in leading Operation Car Wash in 2015. Blakey's influence on Brazilian anti-corruption efforts through his RICO legislation have resulted in the implication of former Presidents, cabinet officials, and dozens of members of congress.

== Later life and death ==
Blakey retired in 2012. He died at the home of his son in Oak Park, Illinois, where he had resided for several years, on May 1, 2026, at the age of 90.

== Selected publications ==
- Blakey, G. Robert (February 1964). "Rule of Announcement and Unlawful Entry: Miller v. United States and Ker v. California". University of Pennsylvania Law Review. 112 (4): 499–562. doi:10.2307/3310634. ISSN 0041-9907. JSTOR 3310634. OCLC 2359920.
- —; Kurland, Harold A. (August 1978). "Development of the Federal Law of Gambling". Cornell Law Review. 63 (6): 923–1021. ISSN 0010-8847. OCLC 1565116.
- —; Goldstock, Ronald (1978). Techniques in the Investigation and Prosecution of Organized Crime: Manuals of Law and Procedure. Ithaca, New York: Cornell Institute on Organized Crime. OCLC 4049476.
- —; Billings, Richard N. (1980). The Plot to Kill the President (2d ed.). New York: Times Books. ISBN 0-8129-0929-1.
- —; Perry, Thomas A. (April 1990). "An Analysis of the Myths That Bolster Efforts to Rewrite RICO and the Various Proposals for Reform: 'Mother of God—Is This the End of RICO?'". Vanderbilt Law Review. 43 (3): 851–1101. ISSN 0042-2533. OCLC 1768951.
- —; Billings, Richard N. (1992). Fatal Hour: The Assassination of President Kennedy by Organized Crime. New York: Berkley Books. ISBN 0-4251-3570-5.
- —; Murray, Brian J. (2002). "Threats, Free Speech, and the Jurisprudence of the Federal Criminal Law" (PDF). BYU Law Review. 2002 (4): 829–1130. ISSN 0360-151X. OCLC 2243706. Archived from the original (PDF) on September 2, 2006.
