= St. John's Preparatory School (Massachusetts) =

Roman Catholic boys' day school

St. John's Prep
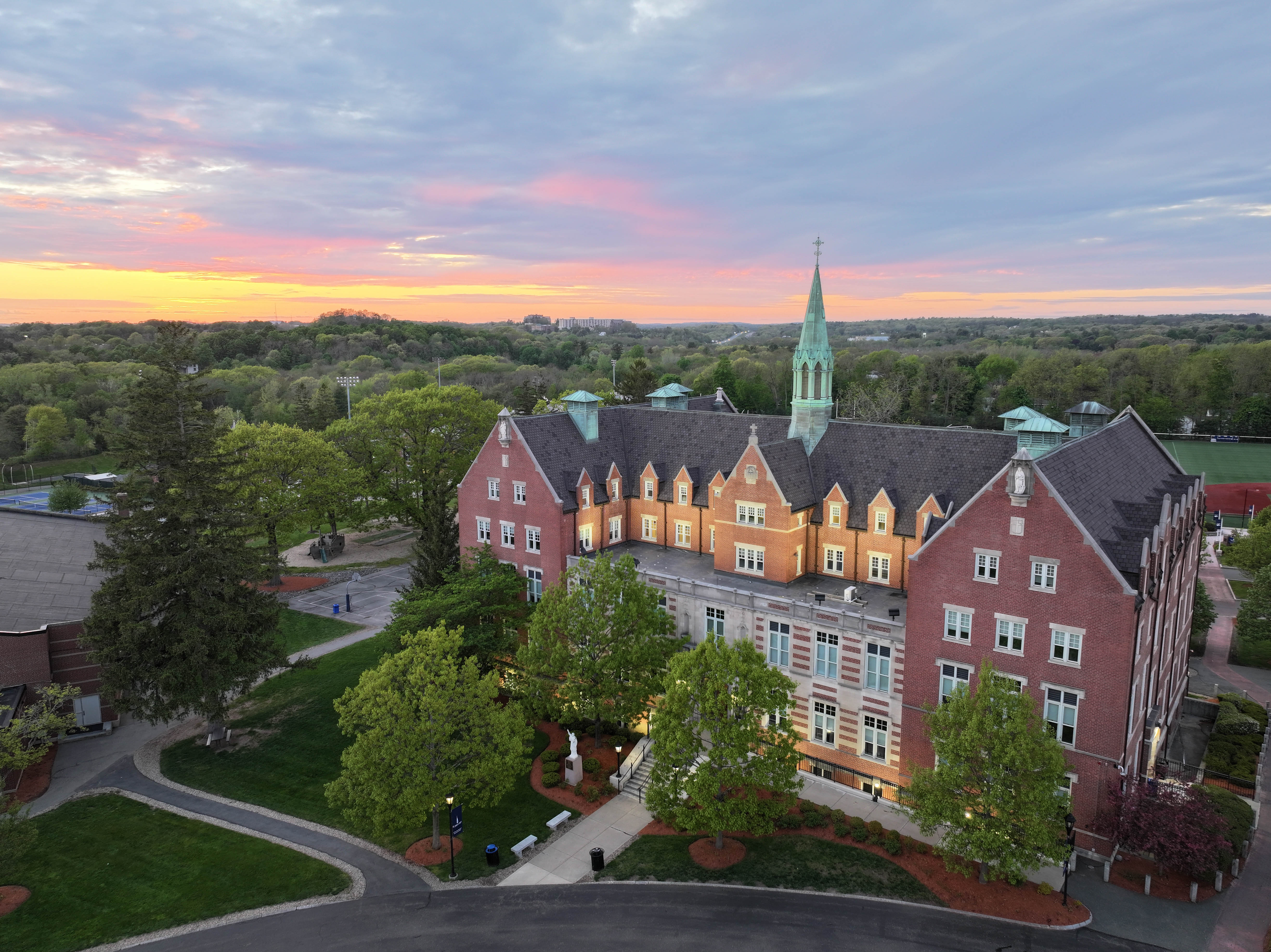
- Xavier Hall at St. John's Preparatory School

Location
- 72 Spring Street; Danvers, Massachusetts 01923; United States; 42°34′57″N 70°57′10″W

Information
- Other names: St. John's; SJP; SJ Prep; The Prep
- Type: Private college-preparatory school
- Motto: Latin: Concordia Res Parvae Crescunt (In Harmony Small Things Grow)
- Religious affiliation: Roman Catholic
- Established: 1907
- Founders: Xaverian Brothers
- NCES School ID: 00600937
- Head of school: Edward P. Hardiman
- Teaching staff: 146.8 (on an FTE basis)
- Grades: 6–12
- Gender: Boys
- Enrollment: 1,460 (2024–2025)
- Student to teacher ratio: 10.0
- Campus size: 175 acres (71 ha)
- Campus type: Suburban
- Colors: Navy blue and white
- Slogan: "We are St. John's"; "It's a great day to be an eagle"; "Faith, brotherhood, wisdom"
- Song: "Far Above the Neighboring Hilltops"
- Athletics conference: MIAA Catholic Conference
- Nickname: Eagles
- Rival: Xaverian Brothers High School
- Accreditation: New England Association of Schools and Colleges
- Publication: Piece of Mind
- Newspaper: The Concordia
- Yearbook: The Spire
- Website: stjohnsprep.org

St. John's Preparatory School is a grade 6–12 private, Catholic, all-boys college-preparatory school located at 72 Spring Street, Danvers, Massachusetts, United States. It was established in 1907 by the Xaverian Brothers.

St. John's was formerly a combination commuter-boarding school, but ended its residential program in 1975.

== History ==
St John's Prep was originally founded in 1907 by a group of Xaverian brothers. The first headmaster, Brother Benjamin, initiated plans to build a school. In the autumn of 1907, he facilitated the construction of the Memorial Gymnasium.

It became evident in those early years that enrollment would continue to rise, construction on Xavier Hall began in the spring of 1910 and it was completed in 1911. At the time it housed 16 classrooms, a library and reading room, a study hall, an assembly hall, 50 private rooms, and a dormitory room for about 80 beds.

On May 22, 2023, a Danvers police detective accidentally discharged his weapon while responding to a report of an active shooter at St. John's Prep, prompting a large police response as students fled the campus. The initial call was later determined to be a hoax, amid a series of similar swatting calls targeting Massachusetts schools.

== Campus ==
St. John's Preparatory school is located in the town of Danvers, Massachusetts about 20 miles (32 km) north of Boston. The school is on 175 acres (71 ha) of wooded, residential land. The school mainly uses four buildings for academics:

- Xavier Hall (built 1911; renovated 2004–05)
- Brother Keefe, CFX Academic Center (2015)
- Brother Benjamin Hall (1964; renovated in 2015 to house the middle school)
- A.E. Studzinski Library (2003; renovated in 2026)

Other buildings include:

- The Administration Building (1880), with a chapel
- Ryken Center for the Arts (1916; renovated 1995), a former dormitory building which has been renovated into a fine arts facility
- Memorial Dining Hall (1925; renovated in 2007 and 2026-27), the cafeteria
- Alumni Hall (1965; renovated in 1993), home to the 350-seat Kaneb Theatre
- Memorial Gymnasium (1955; renovated 1991)
- Leo and Joan Mahoney Wellness Center (2017)

Also on St. John's property are two homes for the Xaverian Brothers:

- Xaverian House
- The Xavier Center (nicknamed "The Brother Barn")

== School life ==
=== Athletics ===
St. John's Prep is a member of the Massachusetts Athletic Association's (MIAA) Catholic Conference. Fellow conference members are Malden Catholic High School, Boston College High School, Catholic Memorial High School, Xaverian High School, and St. John's High in Shrewsbury, Massachusetts.

Since 2001, the swim and dive team has won 16 Division-1 State titles, including nine in a row between 2006 and 2014, with the most recent title in 2024. The fencing team won 10 consecutive state championships from 2005 through 2014. The golf team has won seven state titles since 2000; the team won a championship in 2021.

In 2012, 2018, 2019, and 2022 the varsity football team won the MIAA Division 1 championship. The hockey team won the Super 8 state title in 2015 and the state championship in both 2022 and 2024. The cross country team claimed the Division 3 state title in 2018 and basketball won the 2011 state Division 1 title. In 2025, under the leadership of Chris Vargas, Riley Selvais, Jordan Toribio, and Maxwell Parent, the varsity football team had a perfect 8–0 season, giving Coach St. Pierre's his 100th career victory.

The school's alpine ski team won four straight state titles in a row entering the 2025–26 school year, while the lacrosse program captured the last four state titles through 2024.

== Tuition ==
Tuition for the 2026–2027 academic year is $36,885 for grades 6–12.

== Notable alumni ==
- Joseph Boncore, former Massachusetts state senator
- Bo Burnham, comedian, Grammy-winning musician, writer/director of Eighth Grade
- Sandro Corsaro, Emmy-nominated TV show creator/producer
- Peter R. Dolan (2007 DAA) '74, retired chairman of the board and chief executive officer, Bristol-Myers Squibb
- Thomas Fulham, president of Suffolk University in Boston
- Andrew Haldane, World War II Marine officer
- Michael J. Harrington, former U.S. congressman
- Rob Kerkovich, actor, NCIS: New Orleans, Cloverfield
- The Juan Maclean, electronic musician
- Michael McCann, attorney, professor, sports journalist
- Bishop Robert Reed (2017 DAA) '77, auxiliary bishop of Boston; president and CEO of the CatholicTV Network
- David Self, screenwriter, The Road to Perdition, The Wolfman
- John J. Studzinski (1998 DAA) '74, vice chairman of investor relations and business development at The Blackstone Group; philanthropist
- Peter G. Torkildsen, former U.S. congressman, former chairman of Massachusetts Republican Party

=== Sports ===
- Matt Antonelli, baseball player for Wake Forest; first-round draft pick, San Diego Padres
- Colin Blackwell, professional hockey player
- Bob Carpenter, first American-born hockey player to play in the NHL directly out of high school
- Pat Connaughton, professional basketball and baseball player, Milwaukee Bucks
- Dick Farley, Williams College football coach and College Football Hall of Fame inductee
- Peter Giunta, professional football coach
- Jonathan Goff, football player, Vanderbilt University, New York Giants
- Ken Hodge, Jr., professional hockey player with Boston, Tampa Bay and Minnesota
- Bill Karlon, professional baseball player with the 1930 New York Yankees
- Brian Kelly, college football coach
- Rob Konrad, professional football player
- Steven Langton, 2x Olympic bronze medalist, bobsled
- Stephen Lombardozzi, second baseman for 1987 World Series champion Minnesota Twins
- Wayne Lucier, professional football player
- John McCarthy, professional hockey player with the San Jose Sharks, professional hockey coach
- Joe Mulligan, professional baseball player (Boston Red Sox)
- Danny Murphy, professional baseball player (Chicago Cubs, Chicago White Sox)
- Tim Murray, professional soccer player
- Bill O'Brien (2013 DAA) '88, NCAA and NFL head coach
- James Pedro, Olympic bronze medalist, judo
- Brian Pinho, professional hockey player
- Scott Shaunessy, professional hockey player with Quebec Nordiques
- Glenn Sherlock, professional baseball pitching coach
- Paul Sorrento, professional baseball player
- Brian St. Pierre, professional football player
- Mike Yastrzemski, professional baseball player
- Zak Zinter, professional football player
- Christopher Vargas, prospective NFL First Round Draft Pick
