= Alfred Younges Kirkland Sr. =

American judge

Senior Judge of the United States District Court for the Northern District of Illinois
- In office April 30, 1979 – March 19, 2004

Judge of the United States District Court for the Northern District of Illinois
- In office December 21, 1974 – April 30, 1979
- Appointed by: Gerald Ford
- Preceded by: William J. Bauer
- Succeeded by: Charles P. Kocoras

Personal details
- Born: Alfred Younges Kirkland; October 6, 1917 Elgin, Illinois
- Died: March 19, 2004 (aged 86) Elgin, Illinois
- Education: University of Illinois at Urbana–Champaign (B.A.); University of Illinois College of Law (J.D.)

Alfred Younges Kirkland Sr. (October 6, 1917 – March 19, 2004) was a United States district judge of the United States District Court for the Northern District of Illinois.

== Education and career ==
Born in Elgin, Illinois, Kirkland received a Bachelor of Arts degree from University of Illinois at Urbana–Champaign in 1941 and a Juris Doctor from University of Illinois College of Law in 1943. He was in private practice in Chicago, Illinois in 1943, but quickly left his practice to serve in the United States Army as a lieutenant in the infantry from 1943 to 1946. He was in private practice in Elgin from 1946 to 1973, also serving as a special assistant state attorney general of Illinois from 1969 to 1973. He was a judge of the Circuit Court of Illinois for the 16th Judicial Circuit from 1973 to 1974.

== Federal judicial service ==
On December 11, 1974, Kirkland was nominated by President Gerald Ford to a seat on the United States District Court for the Northern District of Illinois vacated by Judge William J. Bauer. Kirkland was confirmed by the United States Senate on December 19, 1974, and received his commission on December 21, 1974. He assumed senior status due to a certified disability on April 30, 1979, and served in that capacity until his death on March 19, 2004, in Elgin.

== Sources ==
Legal offices
Preceded by William J. Bauer	Judge of the United States District Court for the Northern District of Illinois; 1974–1979	Succeeded by Charles P. Kocoras
