= Samuel Der-Yeghiayan =

American judge (born 1952)

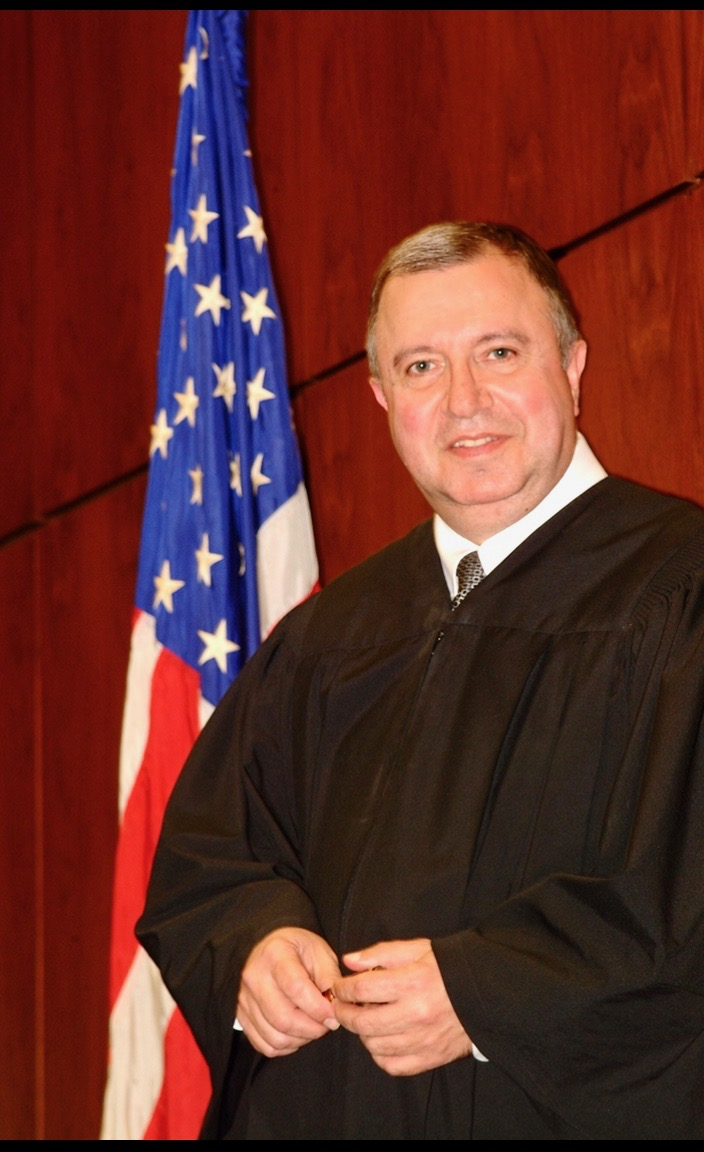

Judge of the United States District Court for the Northern District of Illinois
- In office July 15, 2003 – February 17, 2018
- Appointed by: George W. Bush
- Preceded by: Marvin Aspen
- Succeeded by: John F. Kness

Personal details
- Born: February 16, 1952 (age 74) Aleppo, Syria
- Spouse: Becky Wilson
- Education: Evangel University (BA); University of New Hampshire (JD)

Samuel Der-Yeghiayan (Armenian: Սամուել Դեր Եղիայան; born February 16, 1952) is a former United States District Court Judge of the Northern District of Illinois. He was appointed in 2003. Der-Yeghiayan is noteworthy as being the first Armenian immigrant U.S. District Court Judge in the United States and served over 40 years of distinguished government service.

== Early life ==
Der-Yeghiayan was born in Aleppo, Syria to Armenian parents and raised in Beirut, Lebanon. He immigrated to the United States at age 19.

== Education and career ==
He received his Bachelor of Arts degree in political science from Evangel University in Springfield, Missouri, in 1975, and his Juris Doctor from the Franklin Pierce Law Center (now known as the University of New Hampshire School of Law) in Concord, New Hampshire in 1978. From 1976 to 1978 he was a legal intern for R. Peter Shapiro of the New Hampshire House of Representatives and later for the law firm of Myers & Brown in Concord, New Hampshire. From 1977 to 1978 he was research and teaching assistant to professor Stephen K. Glickman at the Franklin Pierce Law Center. In 1977 he was a law clerk for Judge Hugh H. Bownes of the United States District Court for the District of New Hampshire. In 1978 he was a teaching assistant to professor Peter W. Brown at the Franklin Pierce Law Center.

He began his legal career as an Honor Law Graduate under the United States Attorney General's Honors Program. He served in various capacities with the Justice Department's Chicago District of Immigration and Naturalization Service, with jurisdiction over the states of Illinois, Indiana, and Wisconsin, including as a trial attorney from 1978 to 1982, district counsel from 1982 to 2000, and acting district director from 1986 to 1987.

For twenty consecutive years from 1981 to 2000, Der-Yeghiayan received Outstanding Performance Ratings as a U.S. Justice Department Attorney from different Attorneys General of the United States. In 1986, he received the Frank J. McGarr Award of the Federal Bar Association as the Outstanding Federal Government Attorney in Chicago. In 1998, he received the District Counsel of the Year Award from the Commissioner of the INS and the Attorney General of the United States.

== Federal judicial service ==
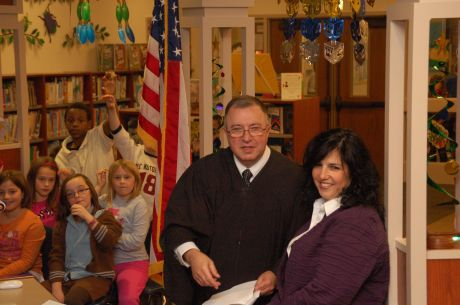
Der-Yeghiayan teaching third graders

From 2000 to 2003, Der-Yeghiayan served as an Immigration Judge in the Department of Justice Executive Office for Immigration Review. He was nominated by President George W. Bush on March 5, 2003, for the district court seat vacated by Marvin Aspen, and was unanimously confirmed by the Senate on July 14, 2003. He received his judicial commission on July 15, 2003. He retired on February 17, 2018.

== Notable cases ==
During his years on the federal bench, Judge Der-Yeghiayan presided over several high-profile cases, including terrorism related cases. In October 2017, Der-Yeghiayan sentenced 18-year-old Abdella Ahmad Tounisi to a 15-year prison term, the statutory maximum, for seeking to join a terrorist group. (13 CR 328).

Der-Yeghiayan presided over several other notable cases:

- Wallace v. City of Chicago, 472 F. Supp.2d 942 (N.D. Ill. 2004) (holding that a constitutional claim brought under Section 1983 action for false arrest begins to run at the time of the arrest, not at the time that the charges against the defendant are dropped)(affirmed by the Seventh Circuit in Wallace v. City of Chicago, 440 F.3d 421 (7th Cir. 2006) and the Supreme Court of the United States in Wallace v. Kato, 549 U.S. 384 (2007)).
- Gowder v. City of Chicago, 923 F. Supp.2d 1110 (N.D. Ill. 2012) (holding both that Section (b)(3)(iii) of the Chicago Firearm Ordinance was unconstitutionally void for vagueness and that it violated the plaintiff's Second Amendment right to keep and bear arms).
- United States v. Firishchak, 426 F. Supp.2d 780 (N.D. Ill. 2005) (finding that the defendant, who served as a Ukrainian Auxiliary Police Officer during the Nazi occupation in World War II, had made misrepresentations in his application for immigration to the United States, and revoking the defendant's Certificate of Naturalization).
- Life Center, Inc. v. City of Elgin, Ill., 993 F. Supp.2d 863 (N.D. Ill. 2013) (finding unconstitutional a specific ordinance of the City of Elgin that had effectively prevented Life Center and other religious organizations from providing ultrasound and other prenatal services to pregnant women free of cost)(after the Judge's ruling, the case was settled and Life Center was able to offer such services).

== See also ==
- List of first minority male lawyers and judges in Illinois
- List of first minority male lawyers and judges in the United States

Legal offices
Preceded by Marvin Aspen	Judge of the United States District Court for the Northern District of Illinois; 2003–2018	Succeeded by John F. Kness
