= James F. Holderman =

American judge

James Holderman

Senior Judge of the United States District Court for the Northern District of Illinois
- In office December 31, 2013 – June 1, 2015

Chief Judge of the United States District Court for the Northern District of Illinois
- In office 2006–2013
- Preceded by: Charles P. Kocoras
- Succeeded by: Rubén Castillo

Judge of the United States District Court for the Northern District of Illinois
- In office April 4, 1985 – December 31, 2013
- Appointed by: Ronald Reagan
- Preceded by: Seat established by 98 Stat. 333
- Succeeded by: John Robert Blakey

Personal details
- Born: James F. Holderman; 1946 (age 79–80) Joliet, Illinois
- Education: University of Illinois (B.S.); University of Illinois College of Law (J.D.)

James F. Holderman (born 1946) is a former United States district judge of the United States District Court for the Northern District of Illinois.

== Early life, education, and career ==
Born in Joliet, Illinois, on May 30, 1946, Holderman received a Bachelor of Science degree in agricultural science from the University of Illinois in 1968, and a Juris Doctor from the University of Illinois College of Law in 1971. He then worked as a law clerk to Judge Edward J. McManus of the United States District Court for the Northern District of Iowa from 1971 to 1972. He was an Assistant United States Attorney in Chicago, Illinois from 1972 to 1978. He was in private practice as a litigator in Chicago from 1978 to 1985.

== Federal judicial service ==
On February 25, 1985, Holderman was nominated by President Ronald Reagan to a new seat on the United States District Court for the Northern District of Illinois created by 98 Stat. 333. He was confirmed by the United States Senate on April 3, 1985, and received his commission on April 4, 1985. He served as Chief Judge from 2006 to 2013. Holderman assumed senior status on December 31, 2013. He retired from active service on June 1, 2015.

== Removal from case ==
In July 2010, the United States Court of Appeals for the Seventh Circuit ordered him removed from a drug trial underway, concluding that he had shown "unreasonable fury" towards the prosecution, the second time in a decade he had been chastised by the Seventh Circuit for improper hostility towards the government.

== Other work ==
Holderman enjoys teaching, and has taught classes at many Illinois law schools. He was an adjunct professor at Chicago-Kent College of Law from 1981 to 1983, and at Northwestern University School of Law from 1982 to 1984. He was a Lecturer at the University of Chicago Law School from 1983 to 2000. Currently, he teaches as an adjunct professor at the John Marshall Law School, Chicago, Illinois (1986–present) and at the University of Illinois College of Law (1993–present).

Holderman is particularly interested in intellectual property litigation, and teaches trial advocacy courses focusing on patent, trade secret, and copyright cases. He also teaches courses related to international IP rights and enforcement.

As of 2016, Holderman is a mediator and arbitrator at JAMS.

== Awards ==
Inducted as a Laureate of The Lincoln Academy of Illinois and awarded the Order of Lincoln (the State’s highest honor) by the Governor of Illinois in 2017.

== Sources ==
Legal offices
Preceded by Seat established by 98 Stat. 333	Judge of the United States District Court for the Northern District of Illinois; 1985–2013	Succeeded by John Robert Blakey
Preceded by Charles P. Kocoras	Chief Judge of the United States District Court for the Northern District of Illinois; 2006–2013	Succeeded by Rubén Castillo
