= Megan Carpenter =

Dean of the University of New Hampshire School of Law

- Education: West Virginia University (BA, JD, MA); National University of Ireland, Galway (LLM)
- Occupation: Lawyer
- Employer: University of New Hampshire

Megan M. Carpenter is a lawyer who was the first woman to serve as dean of the Franklin Pierce School of Law at the University of New Hampshire (UNH).

== Career ==
In 2003, Carpenter earned an LLM in International Human Rights from the National University of Ireland, Galway.

Carpenter practiced law in Pittsburgh at Kirkpatrick & Lockhart (now K&L Gates) where she represented clients on intellectual property and technology-related issues. She is currently a member of the Commonwealth of Pennsylvania bar and the Western District of Pennsylvania bar. She is an honorary fellow of the New Hampshire Bar Association.

Carpenter founded and served as co-director of the Center for Law and Intellectual Property at Texas A&M University School of Law. She also served as Professor of Law and Faculty Director for several intellectual property and entrepreneurship-related clinical programs. At Texas A&M, Carpenter received multiple awards, including the Texas A&M University System Distinguished Achievement Award, the President's Grand Challenge Award, and the Judith Kuhn & Stephen R. Alton Service Award.

=== University of New Hampshire ===
From 2017 until 2025, Carpenter was the dean of the UNH Franklin Pierce School of Law, being the first woman to hold this position. During Carpenter's tenure, the law school introduced a Hybrid JD in Intellectual Property, Technology, & Information Law, which was noted as the first of its kind in the nation.

In 2018, Carpenter was listed on New Hampshire magazine's "It List."

== Early life and education ==
=== Education ===
Carpenter received a Bachelor of Arts in Foreign Language from West Virginia University. She later received a Juris Doctor from West Virginia University. After this, Carpenter received a Master of Laws from the National University of Ireland, Galway. She received a Master of Arts in Foreign Language from West Virginia University.

== Published work ==
Carpenter writes and publishes in the field of intellectual property and innovation.

=== Books ===
- Carpenter, Megan M., ed. (2013). Entrepreneurship and Innovation in Evolving Economies. Edward Elgar Publishing. p. 288.

=== Journal articles ===
Carpenter's academic publications include articles published in the Hastings Law Journal, Fordham Law Review, Columbia Journal of Law & the Arts, Vanderbilt Journal of Entertainment and Technology Law, and the Yale Journal of Human Rights and Development.
