= John F. Kness =

American judge (born 1969)

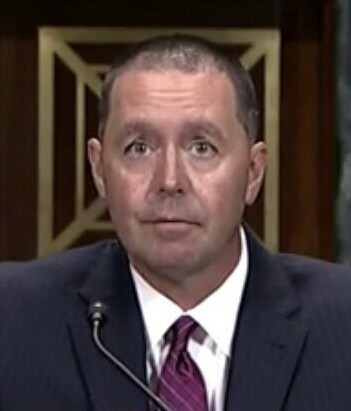

Judge of the United States District Court for the Northern District of Illinois
- Incumbent
- Assumed office February 18, 2020
- Appointed by: Donald Trump
- Preceded by: Samuel Der-Yeghiayan

Personal details
- Born: John Fitzgerald Kness; 1969 (age 56–57) Chicago, Illinois, U.S.
- Education: Northwestern University (BA, JD)

John Fitzgerald Kness (born 1969) is a United States district judge of the United States District Court for the Northern District of Illinois. Prior to becoming a judge, Kness served as General Counsel of the College of DuPage.

== Education ==
Kness earned his Bachelor of Arts from Northwestern University and his Juris Doctor, cum laude, from the Northwestern University Pritzker School of Law.

== Legal career ==
Kness has spent his legal career engaged approximately equally in private law practice and in criminal prosecution. In the private sector, Kness worked mostly in general litigation. As a prosecutor, Kness worked exclusively on criminal prosecutions. Kness handled seven jury and one bench trials, all criminal.

He has experience in law enforcement, having served as a patrol officer for the Oak Park Police Department prior to law school. After graduating law school, Kness served as a law clerk to Judge William H. Pryor Jr. of the United States Court of Appeals for the Eleventh Circuit from 2004 to 2005. From 2009 to 2016, he served as an Assistant United States Attorney in the Northern District of Illinois, with stints in the National Security and Cybercrimes, Narcotics, and General Crimes Sections.

From 2016 to 2020, he served as the General Counsel of the College of DuPage, where he oversaw all legal matters at the second-largest institution of higher learning in Illinois.

== Federal judicial service ==
On June 11, 2019, President Donald Trump announced his intent to nominate Kness to serve as a United States district judge for the United States District Court for the Northern District of Illinois. On June 24, 2019, his nomination was sent to the Senate. President Trump nominated Kness to the seat vacated by Judge Samuel Der-Yeghiayan, who retired on February 17, 2018. On July 17, 2019, a hearing on his nomination was held before the Senate Judiciary Committee. On October 17, 2019, his nomination was reported out of committee by a 19–3 vote. On February 11, 2020, the United States Senate invoked cloture on his nomination by an 82–12 vote. On February 12, 2020, his nomination was confirmed by an 81–12 vote. He received his judicial commission on February 18, 2020. He was sworn in on February 28, 2020.

== Memberships ==
He has been an intermittent member of the Federalist Society since 2004.

Legal offices
Preceded by Samuel Der-Yeghiayan	Judge of the United States District Court for the Northern District of Illinois; 2020–present	Incumbent
