= Robert Michael Dow Jr. =

American judge (born 1965)

Counselor to the Chief Justice
- Incumbent
- Assumed office December 5, 2022
- Appointed by: John Roberts
- Preceded by: Jeffrey P. Minear

Judge of the United States District Court for the Northern District of Illinois
- Incumbent
- Assumed office December 5, 2007
- Appointed by: George W. Bush
- Preceded by: Charles P. Kocoras

Personal details
- Born: Robert Michael Dow Jr. 1965 (age 60–61) Madison, Wisconsin, U.S.
- Education: Yale College (BA); University of Oxford (MPhil, DPhil); Harvard University (JD)

Robert Michael Dow Jr. (born 1965) is a United States district judge of the United States District Court for the Northern District of Illinois and concurrently serves as counselor to Chief Justice John Roberts.

== Education and career ==
Born in Madison, Wisconsin, Dow received a Bachelor of Arts from Yale University in 1987, a Doctor of Philosophy from the University of Oxford in 1990, and a Juris Doctor from Harvard Law School in 1993. He was a law clerk for Judge Joel Flaum of the United States Court of Appeals for the Seventh Circuit from 1993 to 1994.

From 1995 to 2007, he worked in private practice. He was a partner at the Chicago law firm Mayer Brown, where he specialized in telecommunications, appellate and Supreme Court advocacy.

He serves as an adjunct professor at Northwestern University Pritzker School of Law where he teaches complex litigation.

== Federal judicial service ==
On July 17, 2007, Dow was nominated by President George W. Bush to a seat on the United States District Court for the Northern District of Illinois vacated by Charles P. Kocoras. He was confirmed by the United States Senate on November 13, 2007, and received his commission on December 5, 2007.

On December 2, 2010, Judge Dow ruled against five states (Michigan, Pennsylvania, Ohio, Minnesota, and Wisconsin), stating that five Chicago-area shipping locks will stay open despite the risk that Lake Michigan Asian carp pose to the multi-billion dollar fishing industry, saying not enough evidence was presented that indicated the danger was truly imminent. Closing the locks could undermine commerce and pose flood-control problems.

Dow served on the Advisory Committee on Civil Rules of the Judicial Conference of the United States from 2013 to 2022, which recommends modifications to the Federal Rules of Civil Procedure to the Judicial Conference, the Supreme Court of the United States and the United States Congress.

== Counselor to the Chief Justice ==
On October 3, 2022, the Supreme Court announced that John Roberts had appointed Dow to serve as counselor to the chief justice, a role which acts as the chief justice's chief of staff. He succeeded Jeffrey P. Minear, who retired in September 2022.

Legal offices
Preceded by Charles P. Kocoras	Judge of the United States District Court for the Northern District of Illinois; 2007–present	Incumbent
