= Michael McCann (sports law) =

American lawyer (born 1976)

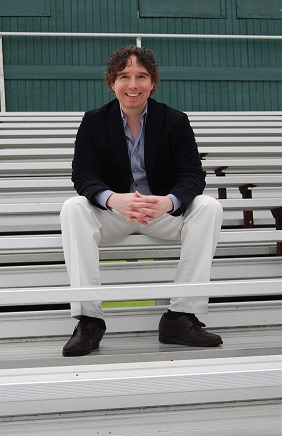
- McCann in 2013
- Born: March 28, 1976 (age 50); Lawrence, Massachusetts
- Education: St. John's Preparatory School (Massachusetts) (1994); Georgetown University (BA, 1998); University of Virginia School of Law (JD, 2002); Harvard Law School (LLM, 2005)
- Occupations: Attorney, Sportswriter
- Writing career
- Genre: Sports journalism
- Website: www.sportico.com/author/michael-mccann/

Michael McCann (born March 28, 1976) is an American attorney, professor and sports journalist. McCann is the director of the Sports and Entertainment Law Institute at the University of New Hampshire School of Law. He is also a regular contributor to Sportico on sports-related legal issues.

== Early career ==
Michael McCann is a native of Andover, Massachusetts. He was admitted to the Massachusetts Bar in 2002. He served as legal counsel to Rep. Marty Meehan of Massachusetts and as a communications aide to Massachusetts Attorney General Thomas Reilly.

In 2004 McCann represented former Ohio State running back Maurice Clarett in his attempt to enter the NFL draft. Although Clarett initially won his case, the decision was overturned by the United States Court of Appeals for the Second Circuit. Clarett ultimately participated in the NFL Draft the following year.

== Academics ==
Prior to joining the University of New Hampshire School of Law faculty, McCann taught at Mississippi College School of Law, Yale Law School, Boston College Law School and Vermont Law School. At Yale McCann oversaw a sports law and analytics reading group, the first course of its kind offered at any law school. He also co-founded The Project on Law and Mind Sciences at Harvard Law School. In 2015, McCann taught a course on the Deflategate scandal at UNH. He was named a “Dream Team law professor” by Prelaw Magazine in 2023.

McCann has authored over 15 articles for nationally recognized law review journals, including the Yale Law Journal, Wisconsin Law Review, and Boston College Law Review. In 2008 he chaired the section on law and sports for the Association of American Law Schools. McCann is also the editor and co-author of The Oxford Handbook of American Sports Law, as well as co-author of the book Court Justice: The Inside Story of My Battle Against the NCAA with Ed O'Bannon based upon his lawsuit against the NCAA regarding its restrictions on endorsement deals and compensation for players’ appearances in video games.

McCann testified before the U.S. Senate in 2021 as an expert witness in a hearing on name, image and likeness and related college sports law hearings. That year, he was named one of the “11 Entrepreneurs, Marketers, and Coaches to Follow” by the International Business Times, citing specifically his opinions on the “Mike Tyson/Roy Jones Jr. exhibition fight” and “his famous 2011 piece on the Mayweather Jr. plea deal”.

In 2023 McCann was named a Visiting Professor of Law at Harvard University Law School, where he taught the course Legal Research, Writing and Analysis I to the full incoming LLM class year. He has also taught intensives outside of university, including one at the headquarters of the UFC on IP and antitrust. That year the Academy of Legal Studies in Business also awarded McCann and his co-authors the Best Sports and Entertainment Law Paper for 2023.

== Sports journalism ==
McCann has written several hundred columns for Sports Illustrated and its online edition, SI.com, since joining its staff in 2007. At Sports Illustrated in 2012, McCann was instrumental in exposing former Arkansas football coach Bobby Petrino's hiring of his mistress as a player development coordinator. McCann was the first journalist to interview Lance Armstrong after the disgraced cyclist publicly admitted to doping during a January 2013 television program hosted by Oprah Winfrey. McCann also wrote extensively on the 2011-12 Penn State child sex abuse scandal.

McCann serves as a legal analyst for NBA TV. In November 2012 he was cited by The Huffington Post as a "must-follow Twitter account for NBA fanatics.". Since June 2020, McCann has been a legal analyst and senior sports legal reporter for Sportico. In all he has written more than one thousand legal and investigative stories for the popular press, with more than one thousand for Sports Illustrated and more than 900 for Sportico.
