= Concord Food Co-op =

Bakery, cafe, and grocery store in NH

Concord Food Co-op is a bakery, cafe, and grocery store in Concord, New Hampshire. The Co-op sells organic produce and local and regional products.

== History ==
The co-op is one of New Hampshire's longest-established food cooperatives. The co-op first opened in 1984, receiving a loan from the New Hampshire Community Loan Fund. It expanded the Concord store in 2005 and later opened a New London location. In 2012, it added a sit-down cafe. The store sells only organic produce and has had a CSA program since 2001. As of 2017, New Hampshire's four co-ops had roughly 50,000 member-owners and $100 million in revenue. In 2017, the store created an e-shop.

In 2026, during a Cyclospora outbreak from lettuce in several other states, the Concord store continued to sell greens from local farms such as Generation Farm. A spokesperson said customers generally continued to shop with confidence because of the co-op's focus on quality and its work with local growers.

== Community and location ==
The Concord store is located on South Main Street, in an area known as Concord's Arts Alley district.

The store offers a Round-It-Up program which allows the customers to round to the nearest dollar to donate to local non-profits. Over the seven years before April 2026, the program raised and donated $229,117. In one March, more than 3,100 people rounded up for NH Mutual Aid and raised $1,510. Marketing manager Rachel Becker has called this support "part of the bloodline of what being a co-op means."
