= Robert H. Rines =

American lawyer, inventor, musician and writer (1922–2009)

Robert Harvey Rines (August 30, 1922 – November 1, 2009) was an American lawyer, inventor, musician, and composer. He is perhaps best known for his efforts to find and identify the Loch Ness Monster.

== Biography ==
Rines was born August 30, 1922, in Boston. He received a Bachelor of Science degree from the Massachusetts Institute of Technology (MIT) in 1943, a Juris Doctor from Georgetown University in 1946, and a Ph.D. from National Chiao Tung University in Taiwan in 1972. During World War II Rines served as an Army Signal Corps officer and helped develop the Microwave Early Warning System.

He held numerous U.S. patents on a wide variety of subjects. Although various on-line sources give their number as 80, 100, and even 200, the list published by the Franklin Pierce Law Center gives their number as 81, and 3 additional ones (Nos. 6,175,326, 7,314,178, and 7,392,192) can also be found in the U.S. Patent and Trademark Office records. However, 12 of those in the larger list are referred to as "applications only", leaving 72 actually issued U.S. patents.

He was a renowned intellectual property lawyer, and in March 2004 received the Boston Patent Law Association "Lifetime Achievement Award" for his contributions in the field of intellectual property. Rines also was inducted as member of the National Inventors Hall of Fame in 1994 and the U.S. Army Signal Corps Wall of Fame. He was the founder of the Franklin Pierce Law Center, a private law school located in Concord, New Hampshire, and the Academy of Applied Science, a Massachusetts and New Hampshire based organization dedicated to stimulating the interest of high school students in science, technology, and inventions. He was a lecturer at Harvard University and MIT and a member of the Technical Advisory Board of the U.S. Department of Commerce. In the early 80's Rines founded NEFFE, New England Fish Farming Enterprises, a Bristol, New Hampshire commercial Salmon farming operation.

Rines was also an accomplished musician and composer. At age eleven he played a violin duet with Albert Einstein at a summer camp in Maine. As a composer he wrote music for both Broadway and off-Broadway shows, including Blast and Bravos, a musical based on the life of H. L. Mencken. He also composed scores for O'Casey's Drums Under the Windows, O'Neill's Long Voyage Home, and Strindberg's Creditors. He shared a New York Emmy Award with playwright Paul Shyre in 1987 for the television and later Broadway play Hizzoner!

His philanthropic activities included establishing the GREAT Fund, providing educational grants for a large extended family in perpetuity.

In May 2008 Rines retired from his position at MIT after 45 years. He died November 1, 2009, at the age of 87.

== Quest for "Nessie" ==
During a visit to Scotland in 1972, Rines reported seeing "a large, darkish hump, covered ... with rough, mottled skin, like the back of an elephant" in Loch Ness. Over the next 35 years he mounted numerous expeditions to the loch and searched its depths with sophisticated electronic and photographic equipment, mostly of his own design. While his investigations produced multiple theories and several tantalizing underwater photographs that received a great deal of publicity, he was unable to produce sufficient evidence to convince the scientific community of the existence of the fabled monster. For this he received the Dinsdale Memorial Award in 2004.

In the decades since their initial publication, more information has come to light about the methodology by which Rines obtained his famous underwater photos, leading many informed observers to view it as deeply flawed. Despite frequently being depicted in the literature as fixed in position, both the sonar unit and camera-strobe rig were suspended from the boats unsecured, allowing them to oscillate wildly and drift into shallower water where they might photograph the bottom. An analysis of the lighting patterns in the photos reveals that some of the photographed objects were very small and very close to the camera, and it seems likely that the sonar unit was recording the movement of the camera rig. In 1984, both Discover and Skeptical Inquirer magazines ran stories revealing that the "flipper" photos from 1972 had been painted over to give them their recognizable diamond shape, and that the original, unretouched photos showed little more than a blurry, indistinct mess, possibly from the camera rig disturbing the loch floor. The famous "gargoyle head" photo was discovered in 1987 to be a rotting tree stump on the bottom of the loch, which has since been located and recovered and can be seen at the Loch Ness Monster Exhibition in Drumnadrochit.

- Martin, Douglas (November 7, 2009). "Robert Rines, Inventor and Monster Hunter, Dies at 87". The New York Times.
- Robert H. Rines. Invent Now. Accessed on September 24, 2005.
- Dr. Robert H. Rines. Lord Corporation. Accessed on September 24, 2005.
- Money Magazine. They Saved Small Business. Accessed on August 28, 2008.
- MIT. Dr. Robert H. Rines: An Appreciation. Accessed on October 9, 2008.
- Inventors Digest. "Robert H. Rines 1922–2009". Accessed on November 2, 2009.
