= Jeffrey P. Minear =

Jeffrey P. Minear was the counselor to Chief Justice John G. Roberts Jr. Minear began work at the Supreme Court on September 11, 2006. Previously he had been senior litigation counsel and assistant to the Solicitor General, Department of Justice (DOJ).

Minear received his bachelor's degree in chemical engineering from the University of Utah College of Engineering in 1977. He worked as a chemical engineer for Union Carbide Corporation in Texas City, Texas, from 1977 to 1979. In 1982, he earned both a master's degree in resource policy and management from the University of Michigan School of Natural Resources and a J.D. from the University of Michigan Law School.

Following graduating from law school, Minear served for a year as a law clerk to Judge Monroe G. McKay of the Tenth Circuit. Minear then joined the Environment and Natural Resources Division of the U.S. Department of Justice, where he worked on policy, legislative, and appellate matters from 1983 to 1985. From 1985 to 1998, he was assistant to the Solicitor General at the Department of Justice, responsible for Supreme Court and appellate litigation focusing on civil, environmental, and intellectual property issues. In his position as senior litigation counsel, Minear was responsible for Supreme Court and appellate litigation and for overseeing the government's participation in all Supreme Court original actions. Minear has argued 56 cases before the Supreme Court.

Minear has held appointments as a visiting professor at Washington and Lee University School of Law and the University of Utah College of Law. He is currently an adjunct professor at Georgetown University Law Center, where he teaches a seminar about Water Law in the Era of Climate Change (https://www.law.georgetown.edu/faculty/jeffrey-minear/.

Minear retired from his role as counselor in September 2022, and was replaced by Robert Michael Dow Jr.
