= Student bar association =

Students' union at a law school

Student Bar Associations (SBAs) are student organizations that exist at many laws schools in the United States. Student bar associations take their name from bar associations, which are professional bodies of lawyers.

The duties, structure, and size of the student bar association varies among law schools. In many law schools, the student bar association is analogous to the student government, and the body acts as a liaison between administrators and students. Other duties may include sponsoring and planning social and educational events and providing student services.

== SBAs in the United States ==
- University of Missouri School of Law - The main objective of the Mizzou Law SBA is to bring student viewpoints into the educational process at the MU School of Law. Student representatives sit on all Law School committees, ensuring that student opinions are known and helping formulate curriculum and policy. Social events round out the process and are designed to allow future attorneys to network for the free exchange of ideas which are of importance and interest to attorneys. The governing body of the Student Bar Association is the Board of Governors. Elected each year by the student body, the Board is composed of a President, Vice-President, Secretary, Treasurer, and twelve representatives (four from each class year).
