= Provine =

Provine is a surname. Notable people with the surname include:

- Dorothy Provine (1935–2010), American singer, dancer, and actress
- J. W. Provine (1866–1949), American chemistry professor and university president
- Walter M. Provine (1873–1955), American lawyer
- William B. Provine (1942–2015), American historian of science
