= Æthelberht =

Æthelberht, Aethelbert or Ethelbert is a masculine given name. Notable people with the name include:

== Æthelberht ==
- Æthelberht of Kent (c. 550–616), King of Kent
- Æthelred and Æthelberht (died c. 669), possibly legendary princes of Kent, saints and martyrs
- Æthelberht, king of the Hwicce (fl. 692–693)
- Æthelbert of Sussex (fl. 8th century), King of Sussex
- Alberht of East Anglia (8th century), also Æthelberht I of East Anglia, ruler of East Anglia
- Æthelbert II of Kent (725–762), King of Kent
- Æthelbert of York (died 780), Archbishop of York, scholar and teacher
- Æthelberht II of East Anglia (died 794), saint and King of East Anglia
- Æthelberht of Whithorn (died 797), Bishop of Whithorn
- Æthelberht, King of Wessex (died 865)

== Ethelbert ==
- Ethelbert Barksdale (1824–1893), American and Confederate politician
- Ethelbert Blatter (1877–1934), Swiss Jesuit priest and pioneering botanist in British India
- E. W. Bullinger (1837–1913), Anglican clergyman, biblical scholar and theologian
- Ethelbert Callahan (1829–1918), American lawyer and politician
- E. Ethelbert Downham (1839-1921), American businessmen and politician
- Ethelbert Nevin (1862–1901), American pianist and composer
- Ethelbert I. Singley (1888–1967), American politician
- Ethelbert Stauffer (1902–1979), German Protestant theologian and numismatist
- Ethelbert Talbot (1848–1928), 15th presiding bishop of the Episcopal Church
- Ethelbert Dudley Warfield (1861–1936), American professor of history and college president
- Ethelbert Watts (1846–1919), American diplomat in World War I
- Ethelbert White (1891–1972), English wood engraver and painter

== See also ==
- St Ethelbert (disambiguation)
