= Dave McCulloch =

Dave McCulloch may refer to:

- David McCulloch (1912–1979), Scottish footballer
- Dave McCulloch (Australian footballer) (born 1937), former Australian rules footballer
- David McCulloch (judge) (1832–1907), Illinois lawyer and judge
