= Lewis Nobles =

American higher education administrator

William Lewis Nobles

President of Mississippi College
- In office July 1, 1968 – August 3, 1993
- Preceded by: Richard Aubrey McLemore
- Succeeded by: Howell W. Todd

Personal details
- Born: September 11, 1925 Meridian, Mississippi, US
- Died: May 25, 2007 (aged 81) Ridgeland, Mississippi
- Education: University of Mississippi (BS); University of Mississippi (MS); University of Kansas (PhD)

Academic background
- Thesis: Some potential chemotherapeutic agents derived from aralkyl ketones (1952)
- Doctoral advisor: Joseph H. Burckhalter

Academic work
- Discipline: Medicinal chemistry
- Institutions: University of Michigan; University of Mississippi; Mississippi College

Lewis Nobles was president of Mississippi College for over 25 years. Nobles grew the enrollment of the Baptist-affiliated university with new schools of nursing and law but was accused of financial and moral impropriety, which ultimately led to his resignation, legal conviction, and imprisonment.

The son of J. S. Nobles and Ruby Roper Nobles, William Lewis Nobles was born in Meridian, Mississippi, and joined the United States Navy during World War II, eventually obtaining the rank of lieutenant. After service in the Navy, he obtained a B.S. in pharmacy and an M.S. in chemistry from the University of Mississippi, followed by a Ph.D. in medicinal chemistry from the University of Kansas and a post-doctoral fellowship at the University of Michigan. Nobles returned to the University of Mississippi to teach, and was eventually appointed as the dean of the graduate school. In 1968, he became president of Mississippi College in Clinton, Mississippi.

Nobles grew the enrollment, facilities, endowment, and sports prestige of the university; he also brought the university into Civil Rights compliance.

In 1993, Nobles was accused of embezzling more than $3 million from Mississippi College, of which $400,000 was used for prostitutes (see Mann Act). He was forced to resign, and he then skipped a legal hearing and was pursued by the FBI. Nobles fled by car to the Memphis International Airport, where he flew to San Francisco, California, under a pseudonym, awaiting an international flight. The FBI tracked him to a San Francisco hotel, where he swallowed cyanide that led to a stroke and partial paralysis.

In a 1996 trial, Nobles pleaded guilty and was sentenced to seven years and three months in prison. He was released in 2001 and died in 2007.
