= Patricia Golden =

American judge

Patricia Piper Golden is the 16th circuit court judge in Kane County, Illinois.

== Career ==
In 1976, Golden became the first woman to win a contested election for a state attorney’s post in Illinois state history, leading the organization to eventually have 6 women to ever fill the post. In 2008, she won the re-election as a circuit court judge. In 2013, she retired after a long career as a circuit court judge. She also served as part of the Illinois State Bar Association’s committee for Fair and Impartial courts.
