= Northwestern University Law Review =

- Discipline: Law
- Language: English

Publication details
- Former name: Illinois Law Review
- History: 1906–Present
- Publisher: Northwestern University School of Law (United States)
- Frequency: 6/year

Standard abbreviations
- Bluebook: Nw. U. L. Rev.
- ISO 4: Northwest. Univ. Law Rev.

Indexing
- ISSN: 0029-3571
- OCLC no.: 46542348

Links
- Journal homepage; Scholarly Commons; Northwestern University Law Review Online (Nw. U. L. Rev. Online)

The Northwestern University Law Review is a law review and student organization at Northwestern University School of Law. The Law Review's primary purpose is to publish a journal of broad legal scholarship. The Law Review publishes six issues each year. Student editors make the editorial and organizational decisions and select articles submitted by professors, judges, and practitioners, as well as student pieces. The Law Review extended its presence onto the web in 2006 and regularly publishes scholarly pieces on Northwestern University Law Review Online (NULR Online).

== History ==
The Northwestern University Law Review was founded in 1906 by a faculty vote as the Illinois Law Review. It is the seventh oldest surviving law review in the United States, (Note: Michigan directly refers to itself as the 6th oldest (see: "https://michiganlawreview.org/history/), and Northwestern was the next one established, thus 7th - although no direct statement to this effect is available) and the second oldest notable law review established outside the Northeast (Michigan Law Review having been established in 1902). Initially, the Law Review was run by the faculty with students only allowed limited roles as associate editors. By 1932, full editorial control of Northwestern's law review had been handed over to the students.

At the journal's founding, John Henry Wigmore, the first full-time Dean of Northwestern Law School, was a frequent contributor. Wigmore penned "adversarial editorials that directly addressed the U.S. Supreme Court of the United States and the 'cowardly' members of the Chicago Bar Association." It has been suggested that Wigmore was motivated to help found a journal after his experience "at Harvard Law School during 1887 and [as a member] of the first editorial board of the Harvard Law Review."

In 1952, the journal was renamed to Northwestern University Law Review although the existing volume number was retained.

== Symposium ==
In addition to individual contributions, the Law Review has a history of special symposium issues on a broad range of topics.

Recent symposium issues have included:

- The Power of State Constitutional Rights (2025)
- Racial Justice After SFFA v. Harvard (2024)
- Data Justice: How Innovative Data is Transforming the Law (2023)
- Fraud and the Erosion of Trust (2022)
- Reimagining Property in the Era of Inequality (2021)
- Second Amendment’s Next Chapter (2020)
- Rethinking Solitary Confinement (2019)
- Originalism (2018)
- Equal Protection and the Social Sciences 30 Years After McCleskey v. Kemp (2017)
- Democratizing Criminal Law (2016)
- Free Speech Foundations (2015)
- Institutional Design and General Welfare (2014)
- 100 Years Under the Income Tax (2013)
- Festschrift in Honor of Professor Martin H. Redish (2012)
- The Legacy of Justice Stevens (2011)

== Northwestern University Law Review Online ==
The Northwestern University Law Review Online is a scholarly legal journal that is the online companion to the Northwestern University Law Review. Formed in 2006, Northwestern University Law Review Online is the first scholarly weblog to be operated by a major law review. It features legal commentary in the form of essays, debates, series, book reviews, and responses to print Law Review pieces. The format of NULR Online allows scholars to publish their thoughts within weeks of an emerging legal development anywhere within the field of legal inquiry, and provides a convenient forum for scholars to exchange ideas in the wake of such developments in the form of debates or multi-contributor series.

NULR Online has also on occasion published special symposium issues including:

- Anita Bernstein’s The Common Law Inside the Female Body (2019)

== Alumni ==
The Northwestern University Law Review has been staffed and managed by numerous individuals who went on to become well-known legal scholars and practitioners.

=== Justices and Judges ===
- Justice Arthur Goldberg, associate justice of the Supreme Court of the United States, and the 6th United States ambassador to the United Nations
- Justice John Paul Stevens, associate justice of the Supreme Court of the United States
- Judge Richard C. Tallman, senior United States circuit judge of the United States Court of Appeals for the Ninth Circuit
- Judge Robert A. Sprecher, former United States circuit judge of the United States Court of Appeals for the Seventh Circuit
- Judge Michael Y. Scudder, United States circuit judge of the United States Court of Appeals for the Seventh Circuit
- Judge Michael B. Brennan, chief judge of the United States Court of Appeals for the Seventh Circuit
- Judge Joan Larsen, United States circuit judge of the United States Court of Appeals for the Sixth Circuit
- Judge Roberto Lange, chief United States district judge of the United States District Court for the District of South Dakota
- Judge Edmond E. Chang, United States district judge of the United States District Court for the Northern District of Illinois

=== Academics ===
- Roscoe Pound, long-time dean of Harvard Law School
- Kate A. Shaw, professor of law at University of Pennsylvania Law School
- Jonathan Turley, J.B. and Maurice C. Shapiro Professor of Public Interest Law at George Washington University Law School
- Diane Marie Amann, Regents' Professor of International Law and Emily & Ernest Woodruff Chair in International Law at the University of Georgia School of Law

=== U.S. Government Officials ===
- Adlai Stevenson, former United States ambassador to the United Nations, 31st governor of Illinois, and Democratic Party nominee for president of the United States in 1952 and 1956
- William R. Rivkin, former United States diplomat and ambassador to Luxembourg, Senegal, and Gambia
- Newton N. Minow, former chairman of the Federal Communications Commission

=== State Government Officials ===
- Daniel Walker, Governor of Illinois

== Contributors ==
The Law Review History specifically notes a "distinguished list" of contributors including:

- Dean Leon Green
- Sir William Holdsworth
- Justice Oliver Wendell Holmes
- Albert M. Kales
- Nathan William MacChesney
- Charles T. McCormick
- Sir Frederick Pollock
- Dean Roscoe Pound
- Dean John Henry Wigmore
- Justice Felix Frankfurter
- Justice Tom Clark
- Justice William O. Douglas
- Justice Abe Fortas
- Chief Judge Harry T. Edwards
- Erwin Griswold
- Archibald Cox
- Paul Freund
- W. Willard Wirtz
- Albert Ehrenzweig
- H. L. A. Hart
- Gerald Gunther
- Edward H. Levi
- Hubert Humphrey
- Brunson MacChesney
- Nathaniel Nathanson
- Dean James A. Rahl
- Dean David Ruder
- Martin Redish
- Kenneth Culp Davis
- Raoul Berger
- Bernard Schwartz
- Ian Macneil
- John C. Coffee
- Gary Lawson
- Mary Kay Becker
- Stephen Schulhofer
- Nadine Strossen
- Judge José A. Cabranes
- Judge Richard Posner
- Cass Sunstein

Beyond the Law Review's traditional legal scholarship, it has published contributions from noted philosopher F. S. C. Northrop, the Right Reverend James A. Pike, Erle Stanley Gardner, and J. Edgar Hoover.
