= Illinois Board of Admissions to the Bar =

U.S. state government body

The Illinois Board of Admissions to the Bar is a seven-person board appointed by the Supreme Court of Illinois that is responsible for overseeing admission to the bar in Illinois.

The Board was created in 1897 in response to a joint recommendation by the Illinois State Bar Association and the Chicago Bar Association that Illinois should have a formal body for regulating admission to the practice of law in the state.

== Major activities ==
The major activities of the Illinois Board of Admissions to the Bar are: (1) administering the semiannual Illinois bar examination; and (2) examining the character and fitness of potential lawyers. After the Board has reviewed and approved applicants to the Illinois bar, applicants are admitted by the court on motion.

=== Rule 711 student licenses ===
In Illinois, a student currently in good standing who has earned credits that represent at least three-fifths of the credits required for graduation, may be eligible for a 711 license (based on Illinois Supreme Court Rule 711). A 711 license allows a student to: (1) Counsel clients, negotiate in the settlement of claims and engage in the preparation and drafting of legal instruments. (2) Appear in the trial courts and administrative tribunals subject to the following qualifications: (i) Appearances, pleadings, motions and other documents to be filed with the court may be prepared by the student or graduate and may be signed by him with the accompanying designation "Senior Law Student" or "Law Graduate" and must also be signed by the supervising member of the bar. (ii) In criminal cases, in which the penalty may be imprisonment, in proceedings challenging sentences of imprisonment and in civil or criminal contempt proceedings, the student or graduate may participate in pre-trial, trial and post-trial proceedings as an assistant of the supervising member of the bar, who shall be present and responsible for the conduct of the proceedings. (iii) In all other civil and criminal cases, the student or graduate may conduct all pre-trial, trial and post-trial proceedings and the supervising member of the bar need not be present. (3) The student may prepare briefs, excerpts from the record, abstracts and other documents filed in courts of review of the State, which may set forth the name of the student or graduate with the accompanying designation "Senior Law Student" or "Law Graduate" and must be filed in the name of the supervising member of the bar.

A graduate who has completed the Juris Doctor may qualify for a 711 license if the graduate (1) has not yet had an opportunity to take the first Bar examination scheduled after graduation, (2) has taken the Bar exam, but has not received the results or (3) has taken and passed the Bar examination, but has not yet been sworn in as a member of the Illinois bar.

A 711 license is not available for a student working for a private law firm. The license is available for work with (1) a legal aid bureau, legal assistance program, organization or clinic chartered by the State of Illinois or approved by a law school approved by the American Bar Association, (2) the Office of the Public Defender or (3) a law office of the State or any of its subdivisions.
