= Elliott Anthony =

American judge

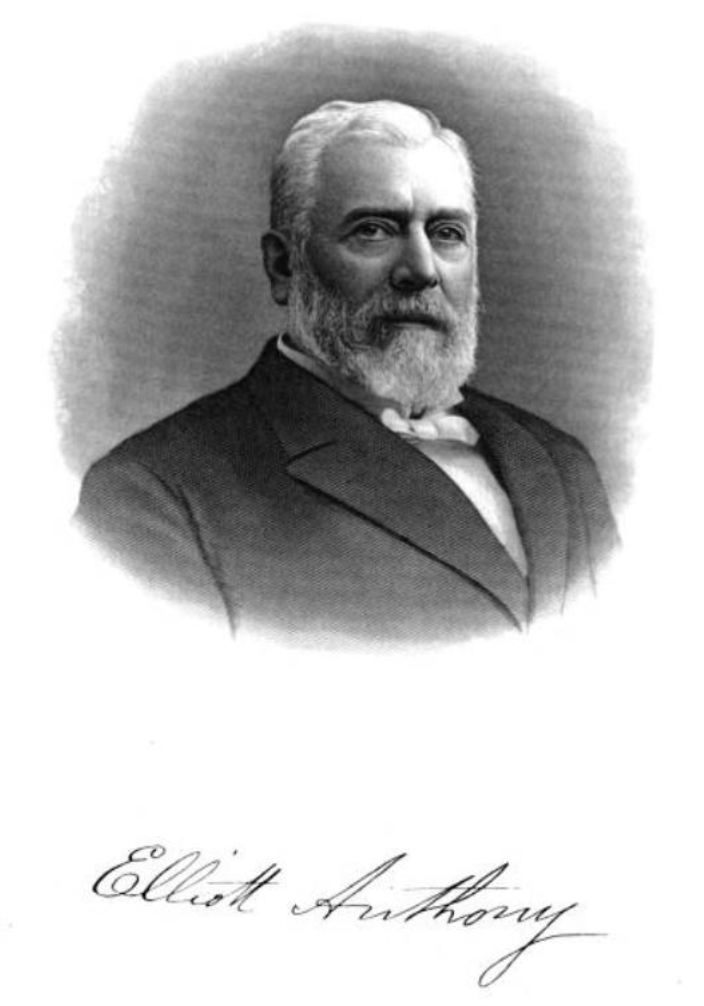
- Born: June 10, 1827; Spafford, New York, US
- Died: February 24, 1898 (aged 70); Evanston, Illinois, US
- Occupations: Lawyer, jurist

Elliott Anthony (1827–1898) was a prominent Illinois lawyer and judge who was active in the founding of the Republican Party.

== Biography ==
Elliott Anthony was born in Onondaga County, New York, on June 10, 1827. He was raised as a Quaker, being born into a family that had been Quaker for generations. In 1845, he enrolled in Cortland Academy and in the fall of 1847, entered Hamilton College, graduating in 1850 with high honors.

After college, Anthony read law with Timothy Dwight V. In May 1851, he was admitted to the bar of New York. In June 1851, he spent one year at Sterling, Illinois. He returned East in July 1852 and on July 14, 1852, married Mary Dwight, a granddaughter of Timothy Dwight IV and sister of Timothy Dwight V. In November 1852, the couple returned to Illinois, settling in Chicago. With the aid of his wife, in two years Anthony prepared and published a digest of the Illinois Reports. Four years later, he was elected City Attorney and then Corporation Counsel.

In 1858 or 1859, Anthony was appointed General Solicitor of the Galena and Chicago Union Railroad, which position he held until 1864, when that corporation became consolidated with the Chicago and North Western Railway Company. When that took place, Anthony was employed by the non-consenting stockholders and bondholders, and engaged in a litigation to break up the consolidation. He published a book on railway consolidation in 1865. The case was ultimately argued before David Davis of the United States Supreme Court and Samuel Hubbel Treat, Jr. of Springfield, and resulted in favor of Anthony's clients.

In 1876, he was called again to the position of corporation counsel under Mayor of Chicago Monroe Heath, and took a conspicuous part at that time in the great reform movement in connection with Thomas Hoyne.

Anthony early took part in the formation of the Republican Party and for more than a quarter of a century was a leader of that organization. He was twice elected to constitutional conventions, called by the people to revise the Illinois Constitution—the first time in 1862 and the last in 1869-70. In the last he was chairman of the executive committee that framed the article in the 1870 constitution, relating to the executive department. He was a delegate to the 1880 Republican National Convention and aided in the nomination of James A. Garfield for President of the United States.

In November 1880, Anthony was elected Judge of the Superior Court of Cook County by a large majority. He was identified with many of the public improvements of Chicago, such as the establishment of graded streets, waterworks, public parks, public library, and cemeteries.

In 1894, Anthony served as president of the Illinois State Bar Association.

He died in Evanston on February 24, 1898.

== Works by Elliott Anthony ==
- A Treatise on the Law of Consolidation of Railroad Companies (1865)
- The Law of Taxation (1877)
