= Mississippi Christian University =

Private college in Clinton, Mississippi, US

- Former names: Hampstead Academy (1826–1827); Mississippi Academy (1827–1830); Mississippi College (1830–2026)
- Motto: Veritas et Virtus
- Motto in English: Truth and Virtue
- Type: Private university
- Established: January 24, 1826
- Affiliations: Mississippi Baptist Convention; NAICU
- Religious affiliation: Mississippi Baptist Convention
- Endowment: US$89.2 million (2020)
- President: Blake Thompson
- Provost: Michael J. Highfield
- Students: 6,322
- Postgraduates: 1,684 graduate students 570 law students
- Location: Clinton, Mississippi, U.S. 32°20′9″N 90°19′53″W
- Campus: Suburban, 320 acres (130 ha)
- Colors: Blue and gold
- Nickname: Choctaws
- Sporting affiliations: NCAA Division II – Gulf South
- Website: mc.edu

Mississippi Christian University (formerly known as Mississippi College) is a private university affiliated with the Mississippi Baptist Convention and located in Clinton, Mississippi, United States. It was founded in 1826 and is the second oldest Baptist-affiliated college or university in the United States and the oldest college or university in Mississippi.

== History ==
=== Founding ===
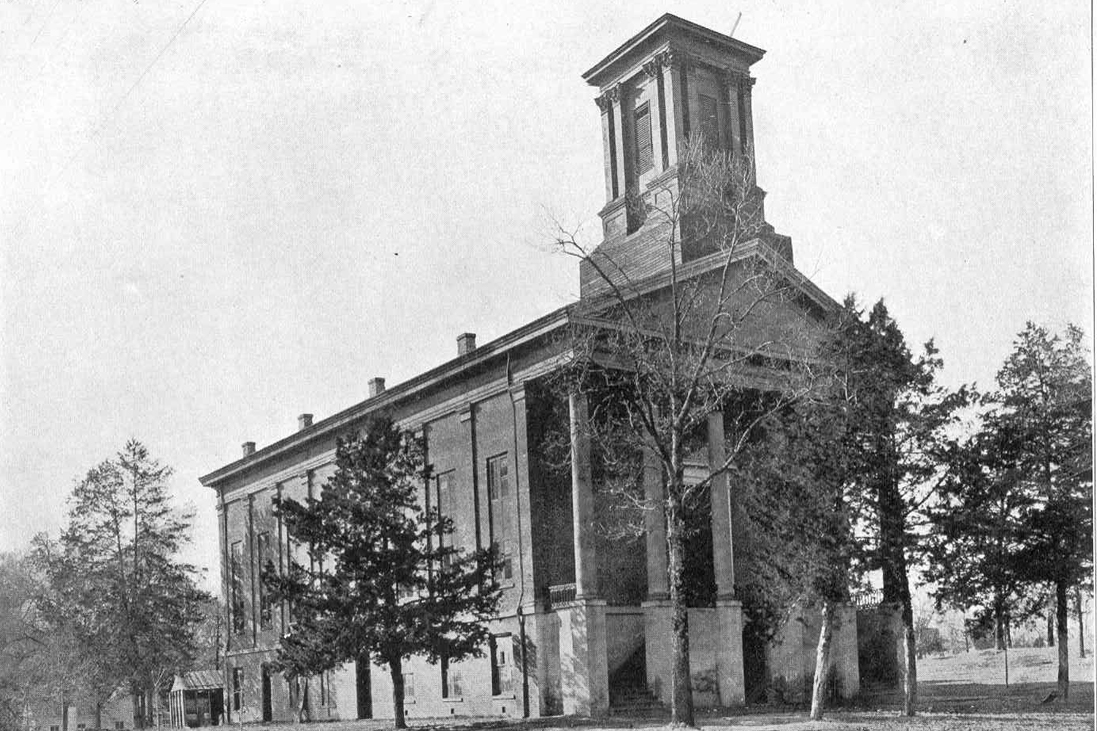
Provine Chapel

On January 24, 1826, the college received its first charter, signed by Mississippi Governor David Holmes. In 1827, the name was changed from Hampstead Academy to Mississippi Academy at the request of the board of trustees. On December 18, 1830, having become a college, the name was changed to Mississippi College. It offered degrees in arts, sciences, and languages.

In 1831, Mississippi Christian University became the first coeducational college in the United States to award a degree to a female student. That year it granted degrees to two women, Alice Robinson and Catherine Hall.

In the beginning, Mississippi Christian University was not church-related. For a number of years, it was affiliated with the Methodist and Presbyterian churches. Since 1850, Mississippi Christian University has been affiliated with the Mississippi Baptist Convention, and the board of trustees oversees the institution.

=== Civil War and reconstruction ===
Classes were not held during the Civil War, and the buildings deteriorated. Many students joined with faculty, a school trustee and townspeople to form the Mississippi College Rifles, a company of the 18th Mississippi Infantry Regiment during the war years or signed up with other units.

In the half-century after the war, the college enrollment and campus slowly recovered. The college president Walter Hillman helped refurbish the buildings by securing Northern financing prior to being offered the college presidency. The endowment fund was renewed, and the physical structures were renovated.

From 1911 through 1932, the construction of Provine Science Building, Lowrey Hall, Alumni Hall and Farr-Hall Hospital was completed. The college endowment grew to $500,000 and in 1922, the Southern Association of Colleges and Schools approved accreditation for the college. Enrollment reached 400 students.

=== World War II and later 20th century ===
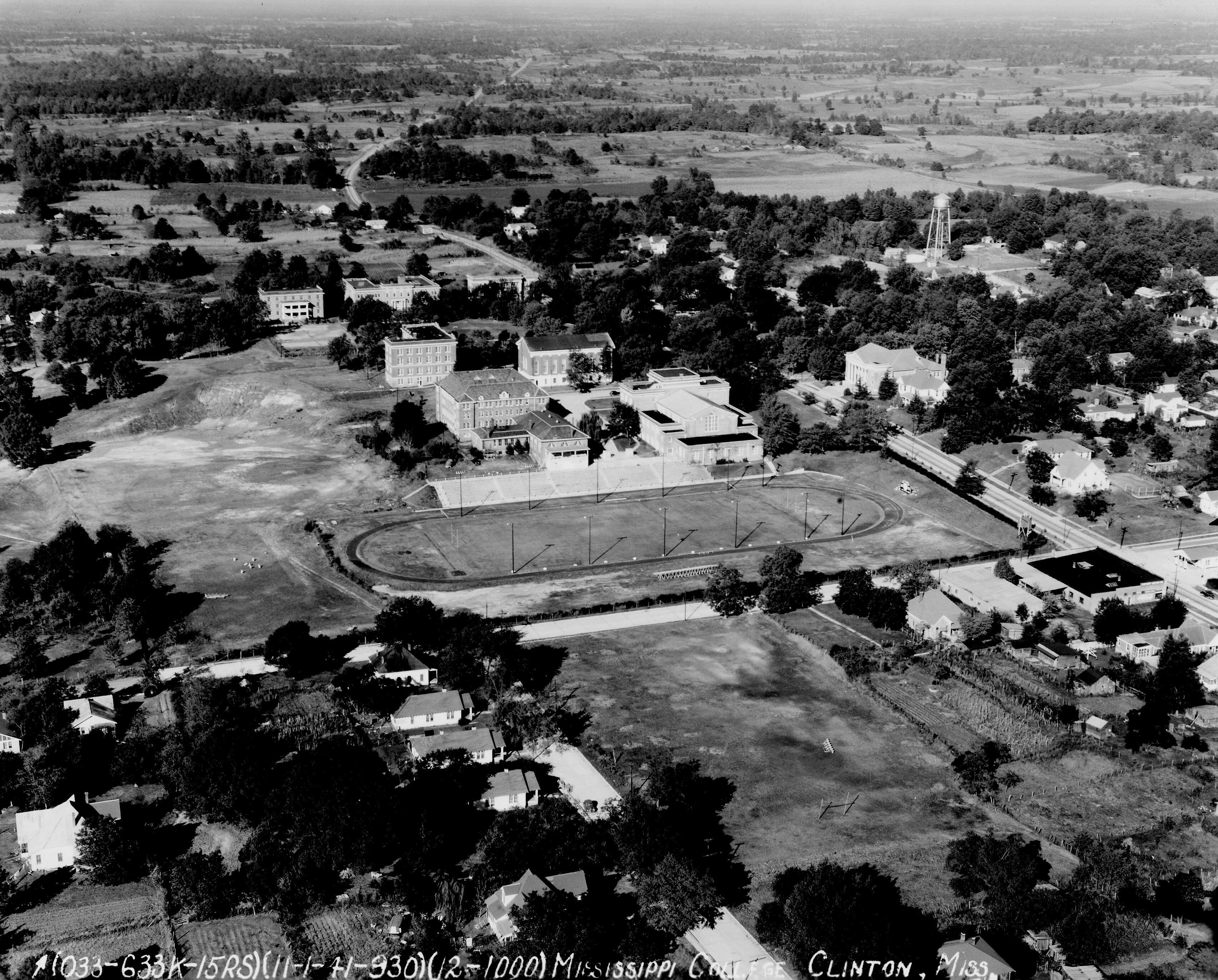
Mississippi Christian University in 1942

In 1942, Mississippi Christian University acquired Hillman College. A new Nelson Hall administration building was erected in 1948, and new residence halls were built.

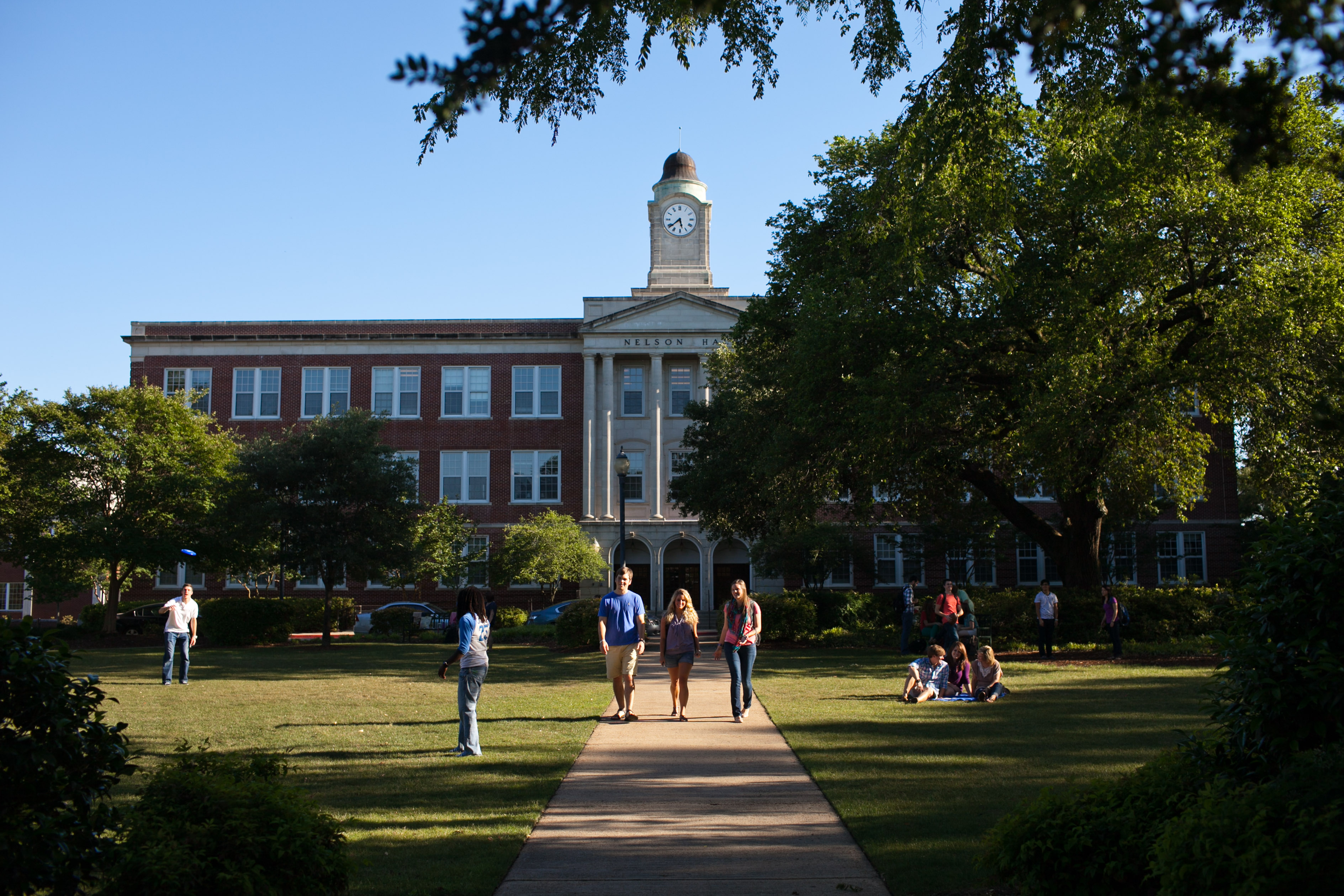
Nelson Hall

In 1943, MC was among 131 colleges and universities nationwide taking part in the V-12 Navy College Training Program, which offered students a path to a Navy commission. During the V-12 period, the Navy had exclusive use of Chrestman, Alumni Hall, and the cafeteria. During World War II, enrollment was between 550 and 600 students. After the war ended and veterans returned, enrollment increased. About 1,000 students were enrolled in 1950, and 1,581 students by fall 1956.

Mississippi Christian University was one of the last private colleges in the country to drop its segregation policy, and did not do so until the 1969–70 school year.

From 1957 through 1968, the college built the B.C. Rogers Student Center, Hederman Science Building, Self Hall, and a pair of residence halls. Provine Chapel was restored. The School of Nursing began in 1969. MC purchased the former Jackson School of Law in 1975, leading to the Mississippi Christian University School of Law. In 1975, the division of business became the School of Business. In 1977, the division of education became the School of Education. In 1982, the 12 remaining departments were grouped into the College of Arts and Sciences.

In May 1992, MC absorbed Clarke College after the smaller school was forced to close due to declining enrollments. Throughout the 1990s, the college renovated and expanded; work was carried out on the library, electronic media center, Cockroft Hall (for the School of Nursing), A.E. Wood Coliseum, the Law School building in downtown Jackson, the New Men's Residence Hall, the New Women's Residence Hall, Jennings Hall, and Latimer House (a Victorian house later used for alumni receptions).

=== 21st century ===
From 2002 to 2015, the college's enrollment grew from 3,227 to 5,152. The number includes a record of 618 freshmen.

The number of international students rose from nine to a record 505 students from more than two dozen nations in fall 2015.

The college added a physician assistant program in 2011. MC was the first institution in Mississippi to offer such a degree. MC now offers doctorates in educational leadership and professional counseling.

Mississippi Christian University was granted an exception to Title IX in 2015, which allows it to legally discriminate against LGBT students for religious reasons.

As part of a restructuring process for the school's bicentennial in 2026, the school's name was changed from Mississippi College to Mississippi Christian University on June 1st.

=== Presidents ===
Mississippi Christian University has had 23 presidents/principals, including three interim presidents. The first three presidents were known as "principals", before changing the official title to "president".

- F. G. Hopkins (1826 to 1828)
- Daniel Comfort (1828 to 1834)
- N. Shepherd (1835 to 1836)
- E. N. Elliott (1836 to 1837)
- Daniel Comfort (1837 to 1841)
- Alexander Campbell (Jan. to April 1842)
- Alexander Campbell (1842 to 1844)
- Interim Robert McLain (1844 to 1845)
- Daniel Comfort (1845 to 1846)
- Simeon Colton (1846 to 1848)
- Consider Parish (1848 to 1850)
- Isaac Newton Urner (1850 to 1867)
- Walter Hillman (1867 to 1873)
- Warren Sheldon Webb (1873 to 1890)
- James M. Moore (1890 to 1891)
- Robert Abram Venable (1891 to 1895)
- John William Provine (1895 to 1897)
- John William Provine (1897 to 1898)
- William Tyndale Lowrey (1898 to 1911)
- John William Provine (1911 to 1932)
- Dotson McGinnis Nelson (1932 to 1957)
- Richard Aubrey McLemore (1957 to 1968)
- Lewis Nobles (1968 to 1993)
- Interim Rory Lee (1993 to 1994)
- Howell W. Todd (1994 to 2001)
- Interim Lloyd Roberts (2001 to 2002)
- Lee G. Royce (2002 to 2018)
- Blake Thompson (2018 to present)

== Campus ==
Mississippi Christian University's main campus in Clinton is more than 80 acres. The MC School of Law is located in downtown Jackson.

Notable buildings at Mississippi Christian University include its historic Provine Chapel, the oldest building on the Clinton campus, which opened in 1860. During the Civil War, U.S. General Ulysses S. Grant used it as a hospital for his wounded troops and reports say it was also used as a stable for his horses. Provine Chapel was listed on National Register of Historic Places in 2026.

Opened in 1926, Alumni Hall houses a gymnasium and a pool. Built in 1948, Nelson Hall serves as the university's administration building and contains Swor Auditorium, the venue for musical performances. Aven Hall houses the recitals at the Jean Pittman Williams Recital Hall and some theatre performances in the Aven Little Theater. The Samuel Marshall Gore Galleries hosts fine art exhibitions.

The A.E. Wood Coliseum is used for MC Choctaws basketball games and is the site for university graduations. Self-Hall houses the MC School of Business and Lowrey Hall, the former MC library, and the School of Education. The Leland Speed Library houses its Learning Resources Center which includes studios for the Department of Communication. The 20,000-square-foot Royce Medical Science Center, named in honor of President Emeritus Lee G. Royce, opened in January 2013. The 106,000-square-foot Baptist Healthplex contains a gym and medical offices. The Healthplex is also the home of MC's Physician Assistant Program. Cockroft Hall houses the nursing and kinesiology departments. The 8,500-seat Robinson-Hale Stadium is the home field for MC Choctaws track meets on the Clinton campus.

University Place residence halls opened in August 2015 to accommodate 189 students. Cost of the eight modern brick units was $16 million. The facilities were the first new residence hall construction in nearly 20 years on the Clinton campus.

The Rhoda Royce Prayer Garden is named in the honor of the wife of retired President Lee Royce. It contains fountains and rocks with scriptures from the Bible. The MC Dyslexia Center was expanded in January 2019 to include additional rooms to evaluate children with the learning disability, and other offices.

== Academics ==
Academic rankings

National
- U.S. News & World Report: 369 (tie) of 394
- Washington Monthly: 437 of 442
- WSJ/College Pulse: 473 of 500

The School of Business is AACSB-accredited and located in Self Hall. The school offers 6 undergraduate business majors and the MBA. With an enrollment of 850 students, business is the single largest undergraduate major on campus.

The School of Education includes the Department of Kinesiology, the Department of Psychology and Counseling, the Department of Teacher Education and Leadership, and the Dyslexia Center. The School of Christian Studies and the Arts includes the Department of Art, the Department of Christian Studies and Philosophy, the Department of Communication, and the Department of Music.

The School of Humanities and Social Sciences spans the Department of English, the Department of Modern Languages, the Department of History and Political Science, and the Department of Sociology and Social Work; The School of Science and Mathematics includes the Department of Biological Science, the Department of Chemistry and Biochemistry, the Department of Computer Science and Physics, the Department of Mathematics, and the Department of Physician Assistant Studies. The School of Nursing is based at Cockcroft Hall on the Clinton campus. The MC School of Law serves more than 400 students on East Griffith Street in downtown Jackson. Overall, Mississippi Christian University consists of more than 80 academic programs.

The Physician Assistant Program enrolls 94 students. The doctorate in professional counseling, the first of its type in the United States, enrolls 120 students.

The MC student/faculty ratio is 14:1. The average ACT score for incoming freshmen is 24.

The institution is ranked among the "Absolute Worst Campuses for LGBTQ Youth" in the US by Campus Pride.

== Athletics ==
Mississippi Christian University competes in NCAA Division II as a member of the Gulf South Conference as of 2014. The college sponsors teams in basketball (men's and women's), baseball, softball, tennis (men's and women's), golf (men's and women's), soccer (men's and women's), volleyball, track and field (men's indoor and outdoor, and women's indoor and outdoor), cross country running (men's and women's), equestrian (women's), and table tennis (men's and women's).

The MC men's baseball team won the 2018 Gulf South Conference championship.

In 2015, the women's soccer team advanced to the championship game of the National Christian College Athletic Association, losing in penalty kicks after playing to a draw with Houghton College. In Fall 2018, the women's soccer team finished the season ranked 14th in the nation. The team competed in the Sweet 16 of the NCAA Division II post-season tournament.

From 2012 through 2014, MC's table tennis team ended the season ranked second of the 250 participating universities. In 2015, the table tennis team won the national championship at the National Collegiate Table Tennis Association games in Wisconsin. The MC table tennis team finished the 2017–18 season ranked third in the nation at the championship games in Round Rock, Texas in April 2018.

MC became the first college in the state to field an archery team in Fall 2014. The university's bass fishing and sporting clays squads takes part in regional and national competitions. An archery team member won a gold medal as the best collegiate male bow hunter at the Spring 2017 U.S. Collegiate Archery Championship in South Dakota. The men's compound team and the bowhunter women's squad won first place at the National 3D Championships in Foley, Alabama in 2018.

The MC women's softball team was the 2017 Gulf South Conference champion.

The university's equestrian team began in 2008.

== Notable alumni ==
- Jake Allen, former Green Bay Packers, Cleveland Browns, Calgary Stampeders, Georgia Force football star
- Lance Barksdale, Major League Baseball umpire
- Ross Barnett, 53rd Governor of Mississippi
- Phil Bryant, Governor of Mississippi
- Alston Callahan, ophthalmologist
- Michael Catt, Christian movie producer and pastor
- Ted DiBiase, Jr., retired professional wrestler, most known with the WWE
- James R. Dow, distinguished folklore scholar, Professor Emeritus at Iowa State University
- Bernard Ebbers, co-founder and former CEO of WorldCom
- Larry Evans, former Denver Broncos and Green Bay Packers football star
- Major Everett, former Philadelphia Eagles, Cleveland Browns, Atlanta Falcons football star
- W.C. Friley, president of Hardin–Simmons University from 1892 to 1894 and Louisiana College from 1909 to 1910
- J. Andrew Gipson, Mississippi Commissioner of Agriculture; Former Mississippi House of Representatives member and attorney
- Edgar Godbold, president of Howard Payne University from 1923 to 1929 and Louisiana College from 1942 to 1951
- Mary Lou Godbold, Mississippi state senator
- Alice Haining, actress
- Barry Hannah, author
- Gregg Harper, U.S. Congressman from Mississippi
- Fred McAfee, former New Orleans Saints football star, later the team's director of player personnel
- Leon C. Megginson, business professor noted for his clarifying statements about Darwinism
- Larry Myricks, U.S. Olympic track and field medalist
- Horace Newcomb, Lambdin Kay Chair at the Grady College of Journalism and Mass Communication
- George Coleman Osborn (1904–1982), American historian and author; class of 1927
- Joseph Turner Patterson (D) - Former Attorney General of Mississippi
- Dayn Perry, Baseball writer, author and poet
- Anita Raj, developmental psychologist, academic, and global public health researcher
- Anita Renfroe, Christian humorist
- Harold Ritchie, member of the Louisiana House of Representatives, 2004–2016, term-limited
- Carroll Waller, First Lady of Mississippi (1972–1976) and historic preservationist
- Michael Williams, former NFL player
- Lee Yancey, Mississippi senator

== See also ==
- The Cedars, historic home in Clinton owned by various university faculty for over a decade
