= Samuel P. Wheeler =

American lawyer

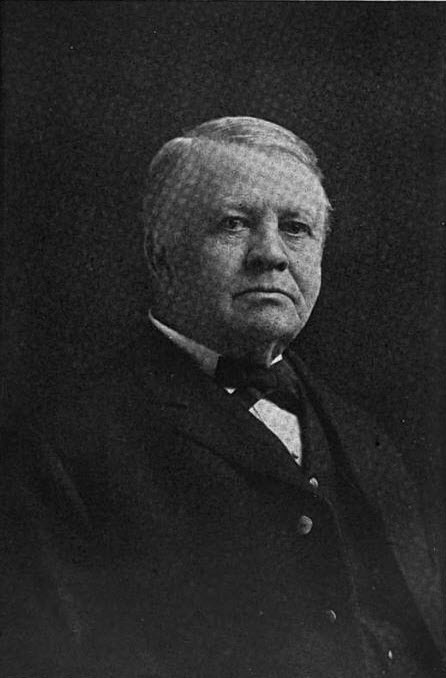
Samuel P. Wheeler

Samuel P. Wheeler (1839–1906) was a prominent Illinois lawyer of the nineteenth century.

== Biography ==
Samuel P. Wheeler was born in Binghamton, New York on January 12, 1839, the son of physician Dr. Alvan Wheeler. After high school, he moved to Illinois, initially finding work as a teacher.

He was admitted to the bar of Illinois at age 20 and then established a law practice at Mound City, Illinois. He later moved his practice to Cairo, Illinois, where he was associated with William J. Allen. Wheeler practiced law in Cairo until 1887, although he did move to Mount Carmel, Illinois at one point to serve as a director of the Cairo and Vincennes Railroad.

In 1887, Wheeler's longtime law partner William Joshua Allen was appointed as a United States federal judge for the United States District Court for the Southern District of Illinois by President of the United States Grover Cleveland. At this point, Wheeler moved to Springfield, Illinois, joining the firm of Brown, Wheeler, Brown & Hay (the firm is still in existence, and has been known as Brown, Hay & Stephens since 1921). His colleagues there included Christopher C. Brown, John T. Stuart, and Benjamin S. Edwards. During his time at Springfield, Wheeler acted as receiver for the Cairo and Vincennes Railroad, the Jacksonville, Louisville and St. Louis Railway, and the Chicago, Peoria and St. Louis Railroad.

Wheeler was active in the Illinois State Bar Association, and took a special interest in advocating on behalf of the act that created the Illinois Appellate Court. When the constitutionality of this act was challenged, Wheeler, along with Anthony Thornton and Harvey B. Hurd argued successfully in favor of the act's constitutionality. Wheeler was elected president of the Illinois State Bar Association in 1893, succeeding Lyman Trumbull.

Wheeler was active in the Presbyterian Church in the United States of America and served as a member of the board of directors of the Southern Illinois Normal School for twenty five years.

Wheeler died on December 2, 1906.
