= Edgar Bronson Tolman =

American lawyer

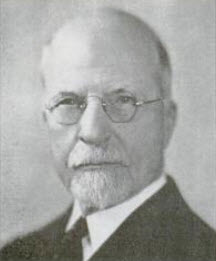
Edgar Bronson Tolman

Edgar Bronson Tolman (1859–1947) was a Chicago lawyer.

== Early life ==
Edgar Bronson Tolman was born in Nagaon on September 5, 1859, the son of a missionary, the Rev. Cyrus F. Tolman and his wife Mary (Bronson) Tolman. His family returned to the United States in 1864. He was educated at the University of Chicago, receiving a bachelor's degree in 1880 and a master's degree in 1882. He concurrently attended Union College of Law (which is today Northwestern University School of Law) while working on his master's, receiving a Bachelor of Laws degree in 1882.

While in grad school / law school, he also studied law with James Rood Doolittle. He then joined Doolittle's law firm, with the firm becoming Doolittle, McKay & Tolman in 1889 (and later becoming Doolittle, Palmer & Tolman).

== Career ==
He served during the Spanish–American War (1898), seeing action at the Battle of Santiago de Cuba. He held the rank of major, and was thereafter commonly known as "Major Tolman" for the rest of his life.

From 1901 to 1902, he was attorney for Chicago's Board of Local Improvement. He was then corporation counsel for the City of Chicago from June 12, 1903 until August 1, 1905.

After leaving government service, he was the senior member of his own law firm, Tolman, Redfield & Sexon. He served as president of the Illinois State Bar Association for 1917-18.

He became editor-in-chief of the American Bar Association Journal in February 1921. He became editor-in-chief emeritus in 1946 and remained on the Journal's masthead until December 1947.

== Personal life ==
Tolman married twice, to Nellie May Brown and Blanch Stevens. He died at the age of 88 on November 20, 1947, in Chicago, where he is interred at the Oak Woods Cemetery.
