= Carole Bellows =

American judge (1935–2026)

Carole Kamin Bellows

Cook County Circuit Court Judge
- In office 1986–2018
- Preceded by: Reginald Holzer

President of the Illinois State Bar Association
- In office 1977–1978
- Preceded by: Francis J. Householter
- Succeeded by: Lloyd J. Tyler

Personal details
- Born: Carole Kamin; May 24, 1935 Chicago, Illinois, U.S.
- Died: May 29, 2026 (aged 91)
- Children: 3

Carole Kamin Bellows (May 24, 1935 – May 29, 2026) was an American judge who was the president of the Illinois Bar Association. Elected in 1977, Bellows was the first woman to serve as the president of a State Bar association. Bellows later served as a Circuit Court judge in Cook County, Illinois from 1986 to 2018.

== Background ==
Bellows was born on May 24, 1935, in Chicago, Illinois. Her father Alfred Kamin had been a labor attorney who was notable for representing John L. Lewis and the United Mine Workers. He later became a professor of labor law at Loyola University Chicago. Bellows' mother Sara Kamin was an Illinois lawyer. Bellows' husband Jason Bellows was a member of the Illinois Bar until his death in 1980.

In 1953, Bellows attended University of Illinois class of 1957 where she studied political science. She also ran for the student government, becoming a student senator and an officer of the independent women's group. Bellows later attended law school at Northwestern University, and graduated in the class of 1960.

Bellows died on May 29, 2026, at the age of 91.

== Career ==
Bellows began her career as a clerk to the Chief Judge of the Illinois Court of Claims. In June 1961, Bellows was appointed to serve on the Bill of Rights Committee of the Illinois State Bar Association. Bellows was elected to the Board of Governors in 1969 where she served until 1979. Bellows became the first woman in the United States to be elected as president of a State Bar Association when she was elected president of the Illinois State Bar Association, where she served from 1977 to 1978. Bellows also served as a delegate to the American Bar Association House of Delegates from 1975 to 1988. Bellows was elected Illinois State Delegate in 1978, also serving as chairperson of the Fellows of the American Bar Foundation. Bellows served on the Council of the Section from 1967 to 1977, and she served as chairperson of the ABA Standing Committee on Bar Activities and Services from 1983 to 1985.

In 1986, Bellows was appointed to the Illinois Circuit court by the Supreme Court of Illinois. Bellows was reelected in 1988, and subsequently retained in 1994, 2000, and 2006. Bellows presided as a judge in the Domestic Relations Division of the Circuit Court. Her term ended in December 2018.

== Awards and honors ==
In 1970 Bellows received the Maurice Weigle Award for Outstanding Service to the Organized Bar from the Chicago Bar Foundation. In 1975, Bellows received the Medallion of Honor from the University of Illinois Mother's Association, and in 1978 Bellows received the Alumnae Award from Northwestern University. Other awards include the Alliance for Women Founders Award (2006), Samuel S.Berger Award, American Academy of Matrimonial Lawyers, Illinois Chapter (2007), Decalogue Society of Lawyers Lifetime Achievement Award (2008), Illinois Judges Association Distinguished Service Award (2013), Seymour Simon Justice Award, Jewish Judges Association of Illinois (2013), Legal Luminary Award, Illinois Bar Foundation, and Illinois Judges Foundation (2018).
