= Charles L. Capen =

American lawyer

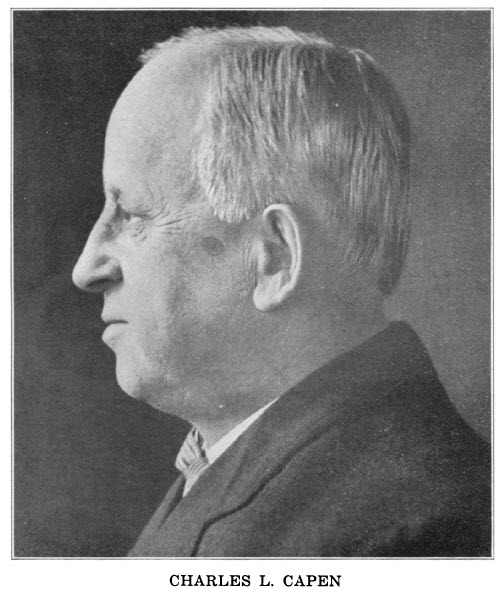
Charles L. Capen

Charles Laban Capen (1845–1927) was a prominent Illinois lawyer.

He was born in Union Springs, New York on January 31, 1845, the son of Luman Capen, a direct descendant of Bernard Capen, who was one of the 140 emigrants who left Dorchester, Dorset to found Dorchester, Massachusetts in 1630. Luman Capen was an ardent abolitionist and maintained a station of the Underground Railroad in Union Springs. A supporter of the short-lived Free Soil Party, in the wake of the Kansas–Nebraska Act, Luman Capen answered the call of the New England Emigrant Aid Company for abolitionists to settle in the Kansas Territory. Luman Capen thus moved his family to Lawrence, Kansas, with the Kansas Territory in the middle of the Bleeding Kansas series of events. Shortly after arriving in Lawrence, Luman Capen saw Jim Lane shoot a man dead in the streets of Lawrence. Appalled by this violence, the Capens returned to New York. The family then moved west a second time, initially settling on a farm near Bloomington, Illinois before moving into Bloomington in March 1856. As a boy of twelve, Charles L. Capen attended the founding meeting of the Illinois Republican Party, held in Bloomington, where he heard Lincoln's Lost Speech of May 29, 1856. Charles L. Capen attended the high school of the Illinois State Normal University, beginning in 1862.

Capen graduated from high school in 1865, and then enrolled at Harvard University. At Harvard, his teachers included Louis Agassiz, Asa Gray, James Russell Lowell, and Francis Bowen. Under Bowen's tutelage, Capen took special honors in philosophy and political philosophy.

After he graduated from Harvard, Capen returned to Bloomington, Illinois, where he read law at the law firm of Williams & Burr. Capen was soon invited into the partnership, which, after the retirement of Burr a short time later, became known as Williams & Capen. Williams died in 1899 and Capen continued practice as a solo practitioner for the next twenty-five years. His firm's most important clients were the Illinois Central Railroad, which it represented for fifty years, and the Chicago and Alton Railroad, which it represented for twenty-five years.

In addition to practicing law, Capen taught classes at the law school of Illinois Wesleyan College, and served for a number of years as dean of the law school.

Capen was also active in the Illinois State Bar Association, serving as its president 1903-1904.

Capen had married Ella Eugenia Briggs in 1875, and together, the couple had two children: Charlotte and Bernard.

Capen died at his home in Bloomington on May 21, 1927.
