= Mississippi Baptist Convention Board =

American autonomous religious association

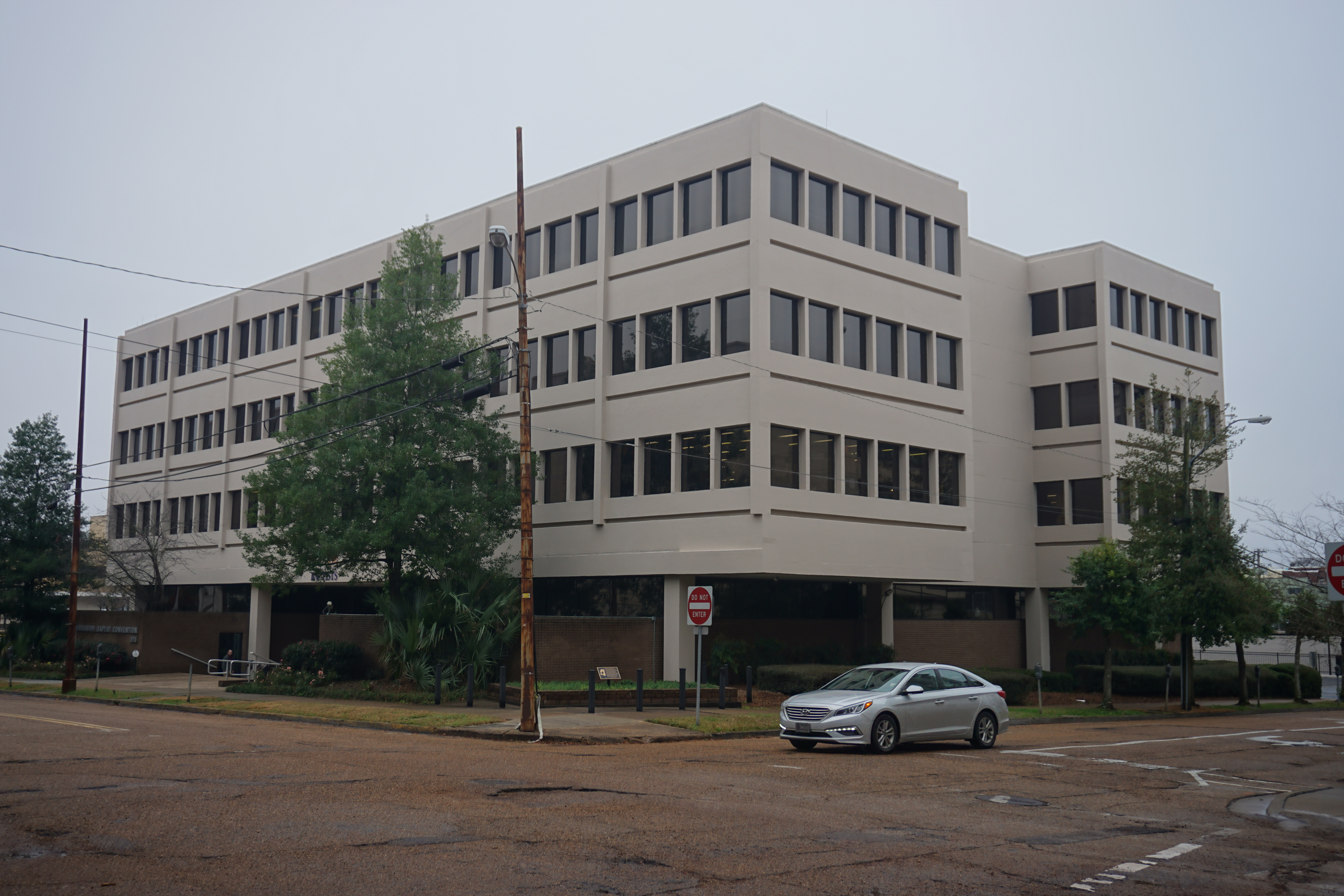
Mississippi Baptist Convention building in Jackson, Mississippi

The Mississippi Baptist Convention Board (MBCB) is an autonomous association of Baptist churches in the U.S. state of Mississippi. It is one of the state conventions associated with the Southern Baptist Convention. Formed in 1836, it was one of the original nine state conventions to send delegates to the first Southern Baptist Convention, organized in 1845.

== History ==
Prior to statehood, Baptist congregations near Natchez organized themselves in September 1807 into an association at Bethel church on Bayou Sara, although the previous year at Salem church six churches had met for the same purpose. The Mississippi Baptist Association adopted 'articles of faith & gospel order', and published their proceedings the following years with many references to Thomas Mercer and David Cooper.

A second organization followed by the title of convention. The first Mississippi Baptist Convention lasted just five years, from February 1824, when it first met at Bogue Chitto Church in Pike County, to 1829, after meeting so much resistance that it was agreed that it be disbanded in 1828.

The second convention was formed on December 23–4, 1836. Its first president was Ashley Vaughan and its first corresponding secretary S. S. Lattimore. Lattimore was still its president in 1852. The corresponding secretary that year was W. J. Denson, and the Recording Secretary was J. T. Freman.

In 1857, the convention established a newspaper, The Mississippi Baptist, with J. T. Freeman as its editor.

In the same year, the convention expressed its opinion on the abolition of slavery, saying that it was an attempt "to detract from the social, civil, and religious privileges of the slave population". Baptist churches in the state had been practicing segregation for some years. The convention had reported in 1938 "that some few of our Churches, and some of our Methodist friends, have adopted the plan of holding separate meetings for the blacks; and that such a course is general attended with an increased interest among them".

Women's societies were some of the largest financial supporters of the convention in the early 19th century. In 1875, the convention formally recognized women's organizations.

== Affiliated organizations ==
- Baptist Children's Village
- Baptist Memorial Health Systems
- The Baptist Record - journal of the Mississippi Baptist Convention
- Board of Ministerial Education
- Christian Action Commission
- Education Commission of MBCB
- Mississippi Baptist Foundation
- Mississippi Baptist Health Systems, Inc.
- Mississippi Baptist Historical Commission

== Retreat centers ==
- Garaywa Camp & Conference Center
- Central Hills Baptist Retreat

== Affiliated colleges and universities ==
- Blue Mountain College
- Mississippi College
- William Carey University
