= Illinois State Bar Association =

American legal society

- Logo of the Illinois State Bar Association
- Type: Legal Society
- Headquarters: Springfield, IL
- Location: United States
- Members: 27,000
- Website: http://www.isba.org

The Illinois State Bar Association (ISBA) is among the largest voluntary state bar associations in the United States. Approximately 28,000 lawyers are members of the ISBA. Unlike some state bar associations, in which membership is mandatory, ISBA membership is not required of lawyers licensed to practice in Illinois and ISBA membership is completely voluntary. The ISBA is headquartered in Springfield, Illinois. It also has an office in Chicago, Illinois.

== History ==
The ISBA was founded on January 4, 1877, at a meeting held in the Sangamon County Courthouse in Springfield, Illinois, attended by 88 lawyers from 37 counties. According to the association’s constitution adopted at that time, the purpose of the association is:

[T]o cultivate the science of jurisprudence, to promote reform in the law, to facilitate the administration of justice, to elevate the standard of integrity, honor and courtesy in the legal profession, to encourage a thorough and liberal education, and to cherish a spirit of brotherhood among the members thereof.

This first meeting elected Anthony Thornton as first president of the ISBA. In 1879, the ISBA gained notoriety after it granted honorary membership to Myra Bradwell and Ada Kepley after they were denied admission to the bar on the grounds that they were women. Responding to a request from the Supreme Court of Illinois on how to improve the quality of Illinois lawyers, in 1897 the ISBA and the Chicago Bar Association recommended that the court require lawyers to have at least a high school education; they also recommended creating what would become the Illinois Board of Admissions to the Bar. The Illinois Supreme Court accepted both recommendations.

The ISBA would later lead a crusade against the unauthorized practice of law; in 1931, they brought a suit against People’s Stock Yards State Bank in which they persuaded the Illinois Supreme Court to declare that it had the inherent authority to punish anyone who practiced law without a law license. The ISBA spent decades lobbying for reform of Illinois' civil procedure, and this ultimately paid off in 1933, when the Illinois General Assembly passed the Civil Practice Act of 1933. In 1962, the ISBA led a campaign to change the judicial article of the Illinois Constitution. The ISBA also played a large role in developing the current Illinois Criminal Code (1961) and Illinois Code of Criminal Procedure (1963). In the 1970s and 1980s, the ISBA lobbied successfully to have Illinois adopt a regime of no-fault divorce and for independent administration of decedents' estates. The ISBA also played a role in creating the Illinois Institute for Continuing Legal Education, the Client Security Fund of the Bar of Illinois, the Lawyers’ Assistance Program, and the Lawyers Trust Fund.

== Organization and activities ==
The ISBA is currently divided into 40 substantive law divisions, allowing ISBA members the opportunity to meet other lawyers who practice in the same field. Each section publishes a newsletter to keep its members aware of substantive changes in the field of law. The sections also offer continuing legal education services for members. One of these sections, the Young Lawyers Division, is for lawyers 36 years old and younger, and is designed to give young lawyers an opportunity to meet and discuss issues peculiar to younger practitioners.

The ISBA operates 26 standing committees and several special committees, councils, and task forces created by either the Assembly or the Board of Governors (see below for more information about the Assembly and Board of Governors). Each committee consists mainly of members appointed by the ISBA president. These committees study issues facing the legal community and make recommendations to the ISBA Assembly. The association sponsors a number of online and print publications, including: the Illinois Bar Journal, dozens of section newsletters, the Illinois Courts Bulletin, and its blog Illinois Lawyer Now. Members also receive E-Clips, a daily email newsletter summarizing legal news and case updates.

Other ISBA highlights include:

- Member benefits, including: Fastcase online legal research service, On-Demand online CLE courses, automated legal form builder IllinoisBarDocs, an online Career Center, an online Lawyer Referral Service, meeting space in its Chicago and Springfield offices, and the ability to purchase malpractice insurance through the ISBA Mutual Insurance Company.
- Legal resources for the public, including: consumer guides covering dozens of legal issues and an online lawyer search tool called IllinoisLawyerFinder.
- Awards recognizing professional achievement in the legal profession, the most prestigious of which is the ISBA Laureate Award. The Illinois State Bar Association’s Academy of Illinois Lawyers was founded in 1999 to recognize those who personify excellence in the legal profession. The Laureate Award, the Academy’s highest honor, is awarded to those deemed to exemplify the highest ideals of the profession.
- Its charitable wing, the Illinois Bar Foundation that promotes pro bono work and other legal work in the public interest. The association also administers the annual ISBA High School Mock Trial Invitational, a mock trial tournament for high school students, with the winning team representing Illinois at the National High School Mock Trial Championship.

The ISBA's supreme policy making body is the ISBA Assembly. The Assembly has 203 lawyer members elected on a pro rata basis from the judicial circuits. The Assembly routinely meets twice a year. It has taken positions on a number of important matters, including repeal of the death penalty in Illinois, support of civil unions, and support of U.S. ratification of the convention to Eliminate All Forms of Discrimination Against Women (CEDAW). Between meetings of the Assembly, the ISBA is governed by a 27-member Board of Governors, which oversees the operations and management of ISBA and is subject to policies set by the 203-member Assembly. The Board of Governors is headed by the president of the ISBA. The president is elected by the Assembly.

== List of presidents of the ISBA ==
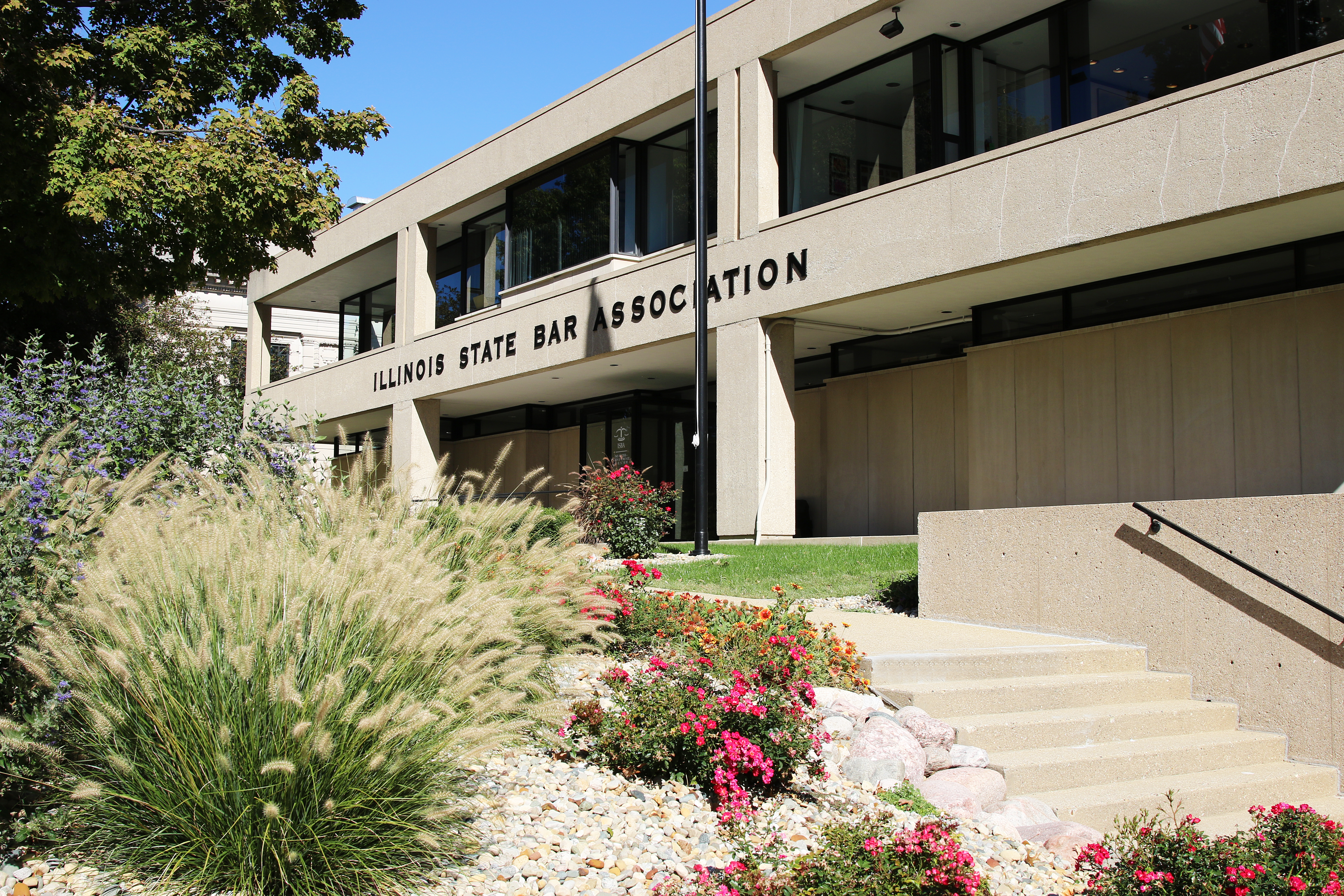
Illinois State Bar Association in Springfield, Illinois

- Anthony Thornton, Shelbyville, 1877-1879
- David McCulloch, Peoria, 1880
- Orville Hickman Browning, Quincy, 1881
- Elijah B. Sherman, Chicago 1881
- Charles C. Bonney, Chicago, 1882
- William L. Gross, Springfield, 1883
- David Davis, Bloomington, 1884
- Benjamin S. Edwards, Springfield, 1885
- Melville Fuller, Chicago, 1886
- E. B. Green, Mount Carmel, 1887
- Thomas Dent, Chicago, 1888
- Ethelbert Callahan, Robinson, 1889
- James B. Bradwell, Chicago, 1890
- James M. Riggs, Winchester, 1891
- Lyman Trumbull, Chicago, 1892
- Samuel P. Wheeler, Springfield, 1893
- Elliott Anthony, Chicago, 1894
- Oliver H. Harker, Carbondale, 1895
- John H. Hamline, Chicago, 1896-1897
- Alfred Orendorff, Springfield, 1897-1898
- Harvey B. Hurd, Chicago, 1898-1899
- Benson Wood, Effingham, 1899-1900
- Jessie Holdom, Chicago, 1900-1901
- John Sanborn Stevens, Peoria, 1901-1902
- Murray F. Tuley, Chicago, 1902-1903
- Charles L. Capen, Bloomington, 1903-1904
- Stephen S. Gregory, Chicago, 1904-1905
- George True Page, Peoria, 1905-1906
- Harrison Musgrave, Chicago, 1906-1907
- James H. Matheny, Springfield, 1907-1908
- E. P. Williams, Galesburg, 1908-1909
- Edgar A. Bancroft, Chicago, 1909-1910
- William R. Curran, Pekin, 1910-1911
- Horace K. Tenney, Chicago, 1911-1912
- Harry Higbee, Pittsfield, 1912-1913
- Robert McMurdy, Chicago, 1913-1914
- Edward C. Kramer, East St. Louis, 1914-1915
- Nathan William MacChesney, Chicago, 1915-1916
- Albert D. Early, Rockford, 1916-1917
- Edgar Bronson Tolman, Chicago, 1917-1918
- Walter M. Provine, Taylorville, 1918-1919
- Frederick A. Brown, Chicago, 1919-1920
- Logan Hay, Springfield, 1920-1921
- Silas H. Strawn, Chicago, 1921-1922
- Bruce A. Campbell, East St. Louis, 1922-1923
- Roger Sherman, Chicago, 1923-1924
- C.M. Clay Buntain, Kankakee, 1924-1925
- John R. Montgomery, Chicago, 1925-1926
- George H. Wilson, Quincy, 1926-1927
- Rush C. Butler, Chicago, 1927-1928
- Franklin L. Velde, Pekin, 1928-1929
- John D. Black, Chicago, 1929-1930
- Clarence W. Heyl, Peoria, 1930-1931
- Amos C. Miller, Chicago, 1931-1932
- June C. Smith, Centralia, 1932-1933
- Floyd E. Thompson, Chicago, 1933-1934
- James S. Baldwin, Decatur, 1934-1935
- Charles P. Megan, Chicago, 1935-1936
- Cairo A. Trimble, Princeton, 1936-1937
- John F. Voigt, Chicago, 1937-1938
- William D. Knight, Rockford, 1938-1939
- Charles O. Rundall, Chicago, 1939-1940
- Albert J. Harno, Urbana, 1940-1941
- Benjamin Wham, Chicago, 1941-1942
- Clarence W. Diver, Waukegan, 1942-1943
- Warren B. Buckley, Chicago, 1943-1944
- Henry C. Warner, Dixon, 1944-1945
- Tappan Gregory, Chicago, 1945-1946
- Kaywin Kennedy, Bloomington, 1946-1947
- William M. James, Chicago, 1947-1948
- Amos H. Robillard, Kankakee, 1948-1949
- Albert E. Jenner, Jr., Chicago, 1949-1950
- Aubrey L. Yantis, Shelbyville, 1950-1951
- Joseph H. Hinshaw, Chicago, 1951-1952
- Thomas J. Welch, Kewanee, 1952-1953
- Timothy I. McKnight, Chicago, 1953-1954
- Karl C. Williams, Rockford, 1954-1955
- Thomas S. Edmonds, Chicago, 1955-1956
- James G. Thomas, Champaign, 1956-1957
- Barnabas F. Sears, Chicago, 1957-1958
- Timothy W. Swain, Peoria, 1958-1959
- David J. A. Hayes, Chicago, 1959 (died in office)
- Gerald C. Snyder, Waukegan, 1959-1960
- Edward B. Love, Monmouth, 1960-1961
- Owen Rall, Chicago, 1961-1962
- Mason Bull, Morrison, 1962-1963
- Horace A. Young, Chicago, 1963-1964
- Stanford S. Meyer, Belleville, 1964-1965
- Peter Fitzpatrick, Chicago, 1965-1966
- Russell N. Sullivan, Champaign, 1966-1967
- Stanton L. Ehrlich, Chicago, 1967-1968
- Alfred Younges Kirkland, Sr., Elgin, 1968-1969
- Henry L. Pitts, Chicago, 1969-1970
- H. Ogden Brainard, Charleston, 1970-1971
- Morton John Barnard, Chicago, 1971-1972
- Lyle W. Allen, Peoria, 1972-1973
- William P. Sutter, Chicago, 1973-1974
- John R. Mackay, Wheaton, 1974-1975
- Lawrence X. Pusateri, Chicago, 1975-1976 (resigned Jan. 2, 1976 to run for Supreme Court of Illinois)
- Francis J. Householter, Kankakee, 1976-1977 (served as president pro tem for remainder of Pusateri's term before being elected to his own term)
- Carole Bellows, Chicago, 1977-1978
- Lloyd J. Tyler, Aurora, 1978-1979
- John C. Mullen, Chicago, 1979-1980
- Robert G. Heckenkamp, Springfield, 1980-1981
- Michel A. Coccia, Chicago, 1981-1982
- John C. Feirich, Carbondale, 1982-1983
- Al Hofeld, Chicago, 1983-1984
- Jon W. DeMoss, Springfield, 1984-1985
- Fred Lane, Chicago, 1985-1986
- Richard L. Thies, Urbana, 1986-1987
- Donald C. Schiller, Chicago, 1987-1988
- Jerome Mirza, Chicago/Bloomington, 1983-1989
- Leonard F. Amari, Chicago, 1989-1990
- Maurice E. Bone, Belleville, 1990-1991
- Thomas A. Clancy, Chicago, 1991-1992
- Peter H. Lousberg, Rock Island, 1992-1993
- Tom Leahy, Chicago, 1993-1994
- David A. Decker, Waukegan, 1994-1995
- Terrence K. Hegarty, Chicago, 1995-1996
- Ralph A. Gabric, Wheaton, 1996-1997
- Todd A. Smith, Chicago, 1997-1998
- Timothy L. Bertschy, Peoria, 1998-1999
- Cheryl Niro, Chicago, 1999-2000
- Herbert H. Franks, Marengo, 2000-2001
- J. Timothy Eaton, Chicago, 2001-2002
- Loren S. Golden, Elgin, 2002-2003
- Terrance J. Lavin, Chicago, 2003-2004
- Ole Bly Pace, Sterling, 2004-2005
- Robert K. Downs, Chicago, 2005-2006
- Irene F. Bahr, Wheaton, 2006-2007
- Joseph G. Bisceglia, Chicago, 2007-2008
- Jack C. Carey, Belleville, 2008-2009
- John G. O'Brien, Arlington Heights, 2009-2010
- Mark D. Hassakis, Mt. Vernon, 2010-2011
- John G. Locallo, Chicago, 2011-2012
- John E. Thies, Urbana, 2012-2013
- Paula H. Holderman, Chicago, 2013–2014
- Richard D. Felice, Wheaton, 2014–2015
- Umberto S. Davi, Western Springs, 2015–2016
- Vincent F. Cornelius, Wheaton, 2016–2017
- Hon. Russell W. Hartigan, Western Springs, 2017–2018
- Hon. James F. McCluskey, Lisle, 2018–2019
- David B. Sosin, Orland Park, 2019-2020
- Dennis J. Orsey, Granite City, 2020-2021
- Anna P. Krolikowska, Northbrook, 2021-2022
- Rory T. Weiler, St. Charles, 2022-2023
- Shawn S. Kasserman, Chicago, 2023-2024
- Sonni Choi Williams, Lockport, 2024-2025
- Bridget C. Duignan, Chicago, 2025-2026
- Perry J. Browder, Alton, 2026-2027
