= Walter M. Provine =

American lawyer (1873–1955)

Member of the Illinois House of Representatives
- In office 1926–1931

President of the Illinois State Bar Association
- In office 1918–1919

Mayor of Taylorville, Illinois
- In office 1913–1915

Personal details
- Born: November 23, 1873 Taylorville, Illinois, U.S.
- Died: January 25, 1955 (aged 81) Jersey City, New Jersey, U.S.
- Education: Cornell University
- Occupation: Politician, lawyer

Walter M. Provine (November 23, 1873 – January 25, 1955) was an Illinois lawyer.

== Biography ==
Walter M. Provine was born in Taylorville, Illinois, on November 23, 1873, the son of William Martin Provine (1841-1926) and his wife Mary (Murray) Provine (1843-1916).

After attending Cornell University, Provine was admitted to the bar of Illinois in 1897. He returned to Taylorville, where he practiced law with his father.

He served as mayor of Taylorville from 1913 to 1915. He was president of the Illinois State Bar Association 1918-19. In 1924, he ran for Illinois Attorney General, losing the nomination to Oscar E. Carlstrom. From 1926 to 1931, he was a member of the Illinois House of Representatives.

He died of a sudden heart attack in Jersey City, New Jersey on January 25, 1955.
