= Dave McCulloch (Australian footballer) =

Australian rules footballer

Personal information
- Full name: Dave McCulloch
- Born: 12 October 1937 (age 89)
- Original team: Glenthompson
- Height: 188 cm (6 ft 2 in)
- Weight: 92 kg (203 lb)

Playing career^{1}
Years	Club	Games (Goals)
1960–61	Carlton	17 (6)
- ^{1} Playing statistics correct to the end of 1961.

Dave McCulloch (born 12 October 1937) is a former Australian rules footballer who played with Carlton in the Victorian Football League (VFL).
