= J. W. Provine =

American chemistry professor and university president (1866–1949)

- Born: June 19, 1866; Big Creek, Mississippi, U.S.
- Died: November 2, 1949 (aged 83); Clinton, Mississippi, U.S.
- Education: University of Mississippi; University of Göttingen
- Occupation: University professor

John William Provine (June 19, 1866 – November 2, 1949) was an American chemistry professor and university president. He served as the president of Mississippi College from 1895 to 1898 and from 1911 to 1932. He was the last president of the Southern Intercollegiate Athletic Association.

Provine was born on June 19, 1866, in Big Creek, Mississippi. He earned a Bachelor of Science degree in 1888 and a master's degree in 1890 from the University of Mississippi. Provine received a Doctor of Philosophy degree from the University of Göttingen in 1893. He died on November 2, 1949, at this home in Clinton, Mississippi.
