= Nathan William MacChesney =

American lawyer

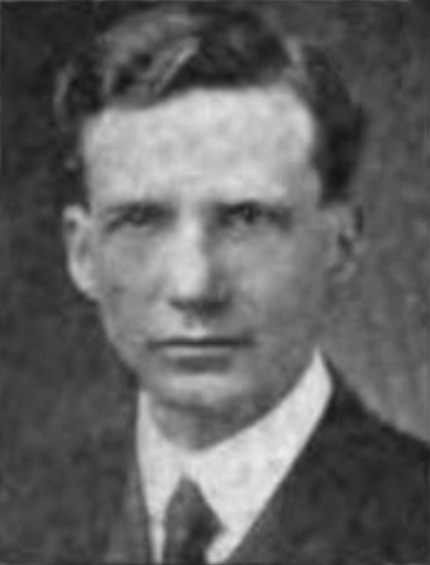
- Born: June 2, 1878; Chicago, Illinois
- Died: September 25, 1954 (aged 76); Libertyville, Illinois
- Resting place: Oak Woods Cemetery
- Education: California Wesleyan College; Stanford University; Northwestern University School of Law; University of Michigan Law School
- Occupation: Lawyer

Nathan William MacChesney (1878–1954) was a prominent Chicago lawyer and architect of racial segregation.

== Biography ==
Nathan William MacChesney was born in Chicago on June 2, 1878, the son of Alfred Brunson and Henrietta (Milsom) MacChesney. He was educated at California Wesleyan College, receiving a bachelor's degree in 1898. He later attended Stanford University and the Northwestern University School of Law, before receiving an LL.B. from the University of Michigan Law School in 1902. He was admitted to the bar of Illinois in 1902.

After law school, MacChesney founded a Chicago law firm, ultimately known as MacChesney and Becker, where he practiced law for the next five decades. He served in the United States Army during the Spanish–American War (1898). He was instrumental in founding the Journal of Criminal Law and Criminology in 1910. He served as a special assistant attorney general of the United States in 1911, and as a special state's attorney for Illinois in 1912. In this capacity, he represented the War Department in, Stearns v. Wood, before the Supreme Court where the Court sided with him and reaffirmed that the federal government had the authority to set training and performance regulations for the state National Guard. He was president of the Illinois State Bar Association 1915-16. He again served in the army during World War I, and was thereafter normally referred to as "General MacChesney" by his associates.

He received an LL.M. from Northwestern in 1922. He was general counsel of the National Association of Real Estate Boards in the 1920s.

MacChesney drafted the "Standard Form, Chicago Restrictive Covenant," used as a model for enforcing racial segregation throughout the city.

He died at his home near Libertyville on September 25, 1954.
