= St Ethelbert =

St Ethelbert, Æthelbert or Æthelberht may refer to:

- Æthelberht of Kent c. 560–616
- Æthelberht II of East Anglia d. 794
