= Ethelbert Callahan =

American lawyer and politician

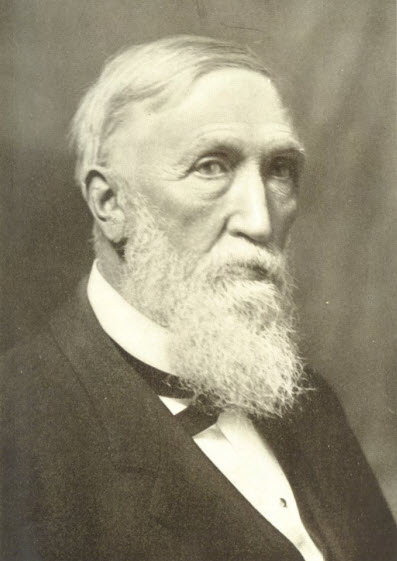
Ethelbert Callahan

Ethelbert Callahan (17 December 1829 – 20 June 1918) was a prominent Illinois lawyer and politician.

== Biography ==
Callahan was born in Licking County, Ohio. As a boy, he determined to become a lawyer after watching an argument delivered by Thomas Ewing, but it would be a number of years before Callahan achieved his goal of becoming a lawyer. In 1849, he relocated to Crawford County, Illinois, where he became a teacher. In 1853, he entered the world of political journalism as editor of the Wabash Sentinel. A year later, he moved to Marshall, Illinois to edit the Telegraph, a paper that supported the Know Nothing movement. He married Mary Barlow Jones on June 27, 1854.

Callahan was elected as a justice of the peace in 1857, and it was at this time that he began to read law. He was admitted to the bar in 1859. He opened his own law practice in Robinson, Illinois in 1861. Over the next four decades, he built one of the most successful practices in southern Illinois. Callahan played a role in organizing the Illinois State Bar Association in 1877, and served as its president in 1889.

Callahan was the first Republican to speak in Crawford County. He was elected to four two-year terms in the Illinois House of Representatives on the Republican Ticket.

McKendree College awarded Callahan an honorary LL.D. in June 1898.

In 1883, Callahan gave a paper at the Illinois State Bar Association entitled "The Lawyers of the Bible." The work was widely copied, and in January 1911, he was invited to deliver the paper as an address at the Indiana University School of Law. This address was very well received and was therefore published the next year by Hollenbeck Press.
