= David McCulloch (judge) =

American lawyer and judge

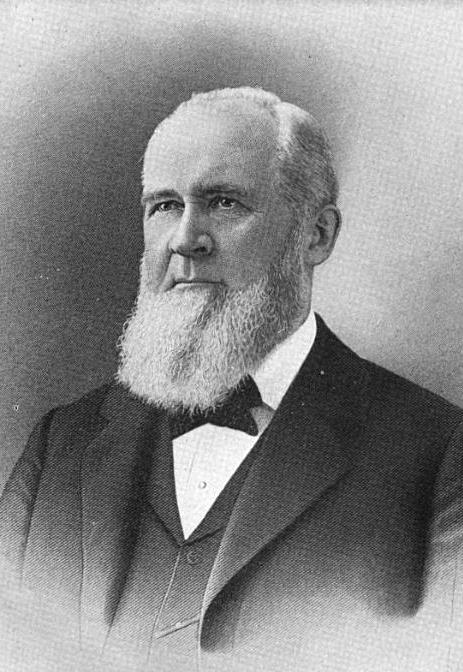
- Born: January 25, 1832; Big Spring, Pennsylvania
- Died: September 17, 1907 (aged 75)
- Occupations: Lawyer; judge

David McCulloch (January 25, 1832 – September 17, 1907) was an Illinois lawyer and judge.

== Biography ==
David McCulloch was born on January 25, 1832, in Big Spring, Pennsylvania. He was educated in a log schoolhouse, before attending Marshall College in Mercersburg, Pennsylvania, 1848-1852.

In 1852, McCulloch moved to Peoria, Illinois and opened a classical school in the basement of First Methodist Church. In 1854, he read law at the partnership of Manning & Merriam. In fall 1855, he was elected as a school commissioner for Peoria County, Illinois, a post he would hold for six years.

McCulloch was admitted to the bar on September 2, 1858. In 1865, he was appointed to fill a vacancy as a prosecutor. Building on his prominence as a prosecutor, McCulloch ran successfully for circuit judge, and was re-elected in 1879. Shortly after he was re-elected, he was appointed to the Illinois Appellate Court, a post he held for six years. In 1880, he served as the second president of the Illinois State Bar Association. In 1883, he ran unsuccessfully for a seat on the Supreme Court of Illinois, losing to Alfred M. Craig.

McCulloch retired from the bench in 1895 and resumed the practice of law. In 1895, Judge Peter Stenger Grosscup of the United States District Court for the Northern District of Illinois appointed McCulloch bankruptcy referee for Peoria, Tazewell, Woodford, Marshall, Stark, and Putnam counties. He was re-appointed in 1900 by Judge Christian Cecil Kohlsaat, and held this position until his death.

He was a devout member of Second Presbyterian Church in Peoria until his death. He also took an active interest in the activities of the Illinois State Historical Society.
